= Suraiya filmography =

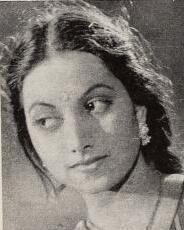
Suraiya in the film Tadbir

Suraiya Jamal Sheikh (15 June 1929 – 31 January 2004), mononymously known as Suraiya, was an Indian actress and playback singer who worked in Hindi films.

In a career spanning from 1936 to 1964, Suraiya acted in over 70 films and sang 338 songs. Regarded among the finest and greatest actresses in the history of Indian cinema, she was known for her strong on-screen portrayals. Suraiya was the most celebrated actress between the mid- to late 1940s and early 1950s and was paid more than her male counterparts.

== Films ==
Year	Title	Role	Notes
1936	Madam Fashion		
1937	Usne Kya Socha		
1938	Mother India		
1941	Taj Mahal	Young Mumtaz Mahal	
1942	Tamanna	Suraiya	
1942	Station Master	Usha	
1943	Ishaara		
1943	Hamari Baat		
1945	Yateem	Bharti	
1945	Tadbir	Saguna	
1945	Samrat Chandragupta		
1945	Phool	Shama	
1945	Main Kya Karoon		
1946	Jag Biti		
1946	1857	Tasnim	
1946	Anmol Ghadi	Basanti	
1946	Omar Khaiyyam	Mehru	
1947	Parwana	Gopi	
1947	Naatak		
1947	Do Dil		
1947	Dard	Hamida	
1947	Dak Bangla		
1947	Do Naina		
1948	Aaj Ki Raat		
1948	Vidya	Vidya	
1948	Shakti	Shakti	
1948	Rang Mahal		
1948	Pyar Ki Jeet		
1948	Kajal	Kajal	
1948	Gajre	Asha	
1949	Singaar	Shanta	
1949	Shair	Rani	
1949	Naach		
1949	Lekh		
1949	Jeet	Jeet	
1949	Duniya		
1949	Dillagi	Mala	
1949	Char Din		
1949	Balam	Kamla	
1949	Bari Behen	Shyama	
1949	Amar Kahani	Kanchan	
1950	Shaan		
1950	Nili	Nilli	
1950	Khiladi		
1950	Kamal Ke Phool		
1950	Dastan	Indira	
1950	Afsar	Bimala	
1951	Shokhiyan	Sanwli	
1951	Sanam	Sadhana	
1951	Rajput		
1951	Do Sitare	Rani	
1952	Resham	Resham	
1952	Moti Mahal	Roopa	
1952	Lal Kunwar		
1952	Khubsoorat		
1952	Goonj		
1952	Diwana	Laali	
1953	Mashuqa		
1954	Mirza Ghalib	Moti Begum alias Chaudhvin Begum (Note: Suraiya played a single character with two or more names.)	
1954	Bilwamangal	Chintamani	
1954	Waris	Shobha	
1954	Shama Parwana	Sahebzadi Aalam	
1955	Kanchan	Kanchan	
1955	Inam		
1956	Mr. Lambu	Jyoti	
1958	Trolly Driver	Renu	
1958	Miss 1958		
1958	Maalik	Nirmala "Nirmal"	
1961	Shama	Roshan Ara	
1963	Rustam Sohrab	Shehzadi Tahmina	Final film

== Discography ==
- This list does not include all the songs sung by Suraiya.

Year	Film	Song	Composer	Ref.
1942	Nai Duniya	"Boot Karun Mai Polish, Babu"	Naushad	
1942	Sharda	—N/a	Naushad	
1943	Kanoon	"Aaye Jawani Jaaye Jawani"	Naushad	
1943	Kanoon	"Ek Dil Tera Ek Dil Mera"	Naushad	
1943	Kanoon	"Ek Tu Ho Ek Main Hoon"	Naushad	
1943	Kanoon	"Toot Gaya Ek Tara Mann Ka"	Naushad	
1943	Sanjog	—N/a	Naushad	
1946	Shama	—N/a	Ghulam Haider	
1949	Badi Behen	"Ho Likhnewale Ne Likh Di"	Husnlal Bhagatram	
1949	Badi Behen	"Bigdi Bananewale"	Husnlal Bhagatram	
1949	Badi Behen	"Woh Paas Rahe Ya Door Rahe"	Husnlal Bhagatram	
1949	Badi Behen	"Tum Mujh Ko Bhool Jao"	Husnlal Bhagatram	
1949	Amar Kahani	"Diwali Ki Raat"	Husnlal Bhagatram	
1949	Amar Kahani	"Beete Hue Din Raat"	Husnlal Bhagatram	
1949	Amar Kahani	"Umangon Par Jawani"	Husnlal Bhagatram	
1949	Amar Kahani	"Yaad Aa Raha Hai Dil Ko"	Husnlal Bhagatram	
1949	Amar Kahani	"Ek Teri Nazar Ek Meri Nazar"	Husnlal Bhagatram	
1949	Shair	"Aaj Koi Hai Aanewala"	Ghulam Mohammed	
1949	Shair	"Dil Ki Duniya Ujad Gayi"	Ghulam Mohammed	
1949	Shair	"Hamen Tum Bhul Baithe"	Ghulam Mohammed	
1949	Shair	"Duniya Ke Sitam Ka Koi"	Ghulam Mohammed	
1949	Shair	"Kya Cheez Hai Mohabbat"	Ghulam Mohammed	
1950	Dastan	"Yeh Sawan Ki Rut, Tum Aur Hum, Dil Nache Re Chham Chham Chham"	Naushad	
1950	Dastan	"Dil Ko Teri Tasveer Se Behlaye Huye Hai, Behlaye Huye Hai"	Naushad	
1950	Dastan	"Dhadak Dhadak Dil Dhadke, Phadak Phadak Nain Phadke"	Naushad	
1950	Dastan	"Mohabbat Badhakar Juda Ho Gaye"	Naushad	
1950	Dastan	"Yeh Mausam Aur Yeh Tanhai"	Naushad	
1950	Dastan	"Naam Tera Hai Zuban Par"	Naushad	
1950	Dastan	"Nainon Mein Preet Hai"	Naushad	
1950	Dastan	"Aaya Mere Dil Mein Tu"	Naushad	
1950	Dastan	"Ae Shama Tu Bata"	Naushad	
1950	Afsar	"Mann Mor Huaa Matawaala"	S. D. Burman	
1950	Afsar	"Nain Diwane Ek Nahi Mane"	S. D. Burman	
1950	Afsar	"Gun Gun Gun Gun Bole Re Bhanwar"	S. D. Burman	
1950	Afsar	"Preet Ka Nata Jodne Wale"	S. D. Burman	
1950	Afsar	"Jhat Khol De Kiwad Pat Khol De"	S. D. Burman	
1950	Afsar	"Pardesi Re Jate Jate Kiya Mora Liye Ja"	S. D. Burman	
1951	Sanam	"O Sanam, Main Tujhe Pukaarun SanamSanam"	Husnlal Bhagatram	
1951	Sanam	"Mai Kah Du Tumko Chor To"	Husnlal Bhagatram	
1951	Sanam	"Bedard Shikaari Are Bedard Shikaari"	Husnlal Bhagatram	
1951	Sanam	"Mere Chahne Wale Hazar"	Husnlal Bhagatram	
1951	Sanam	"Honthon Pe Kisi Kaa Naam, Isakaa Kyaa Matalab Hai"	Husnlal Bhagatram	
1951	Sanam	"Bolo Bolo Re Bhagwan Bolo Bolo Re"	Husnlal Bhagatram	
1951	Sanam	"Duniya Wale Meri Duniya Lut Gayi"	Husnlal Bhagatram	
1951	Sanam	"Mera Dil Todkar Jaane Wale"	Husnlal Bhagatram	
1951	Sanam	"Nayaa Nayaa Hai Pyaar Zamaanaa Dekh Na Le"	Husnlal Bhagatram	
1951	Sanam	"Ye Kehti Hai Dunia Tujhe Bhul Jau"	Husnlal Bhagatram	
1951	Sanam	"Dil Le Gaya Ji Koi Dil Le Gaya"	Husnlal Bhagatram	
1952	Diwana	"Mora Nazuk Badan"	Naushad	
1952	Diwana	"Dil Mein Aa Gaya Koi"	Naushad	
1952	Diwana	"Jeene Diya Na Chain Se"	Naushad	
1952	Diwana	"Mere Chand Mere Lal"	Naushad	
1952	Diwana	"Lagi Hai Manmandir"	Naushad	
1954	Mirza Ghalib	"Dil - E - Nadan Tujhe"	Ghulam Mohammed	
1954	Mirza Ghalib	"Aah Ko Chahiye Ek Umar"	Ghulam Mohammed	
1954	Mirza Ghalib	"Nukta Cheen Hai"	Ghulam Mohammed	
1954	Mirza Ghalib	"Jahan Koi Na Ho"	Ghulam Mohammed	
1954	Mirza Ghalib	"Yeh Na Thi Hamari Qismat"	Ghulam Mohammed	
1956	Mr. Lambu	"Tu Zara Si Baat Par Khafa Na Ho"	O. P. Nayyar	
1956	Mr. Lambu	"Yaad Karoon Tohri Batiya"	O. P. Nayyar	
1956	Mr. Lambu	"Soyi Hai Kahan Jakar"	O. P. Nayyar	
1963	Rustam Sohrab	"Yeh Kaisi Ajab Dastaan Ho Gayi Hai"	Sajjad Hussain	
