= Bimal Roy Memorial Trophy =

The Bimal Roy Memorial Trophy honor experienced artists and other contributors from the Indian film industry as well as a young filmmaker. It has been awarded every year since 1997, by the Bimal Roy Memorial & Film Society. The Trophy is named after Bimal Roy, an Indian filmmaker who became known as the "Silent Master of Indian Cinema".

== Recipients ==
Recipients have included:

=== 1997 Awards ===
Dilip Gupta (Director of Photography) was an original cinematographer of many outstanding Bollywood films including Madhumatiand Biraj Bahu.

=== 1998 Awards ===
Kidar Sharma (Writer – Director) was a pioneer in his field, who entered film in 1934 with Seeta as a photographer. He was a writer and director of several noteworthy films, such as Jogan, Chitralekha (1941 film) and Chitralekha (1964 film). Kidar Sharma discovered many stars such as Raj Kapoor.

=== 1999 Awards ===
Suraiya Sheikh (Performing Artist.) Suraiya was one of the tallest singing stars of the early golden years of Indian Hindi cinema of the nineteen forties and fifties. She sang her own songs in her films, which included many successes such as Mirza Ghalib, Dastan and Sharda.

=== 2000 Awards ===
Esther Victoria Abraham a.k.a. Pramila (Performing Artist) was the first Miss India. She was a champion of women's causes in films and acted in 1942 in Ulti Ganga, a film in which women were shown superior to men in every aspect.

=== 2001 Awards ===
Manna Dey had a long career in Hindi music industry as a singer who made his mark as a singer.

=== 2003 Awards ===
Vyjayantimala Bali (Performing Artist) was an actress and dancer in Bollywood for 20 years. She started her career with Tamil films, but after three years switched over to Hindi and made a name for herself in films including Madhumati and Sangam. In the middle of her career, she returned to Tamil films for a few years.

=== 2004 Awards ===
Ram Narayan (Classical Musician) is a sarangi player and has brought the musical instrument into focus in the country and world over.

=== 2005 Awards ===
Kamini Kaushal (Performing Artist) entered the Hindi film industry as an actress of note in the late 1940s' and held her own place amongst the top heroines till late fifties. She acted in character roles until recently.

=== 2011 Awards ===
Pran Krishan Sikand or simply Pran (Performing Artist). In a film career starting from the early nineteen forties until late nineties, he acted in all kind of roles, but most notably as a Bollywood villain.
