= Daughters of Today =

Daughters of Today may refer to:

- Daughters of Today (1924 film), an American silent drama film
- Daughters of Today (1928 film), a Pakistani silent film
- Daughters of Today (1933 film), a British film directed by F.W. Kraemer
