= Junglemahal: The Awakening =

2023 film directed by Jitesh Kumar Parida

- Directed by: Arunava Chowdhury
- Written by: Arunava Chowdhury
- Produced by: Arunava Chowdhury; Targol Bahadori
- Starring: Aditya Baliyan; Farhad Khairy; Amit Raina; Suraiya Parveen; Masoomeh Ab; Prashant Shinde
- Release date: 20 January 2023
- Country: India
- Language: Hindi

Junglemahal: The Awakening is a Hindi film directed by Arunava Chowdhury. It stars Masoomeh Ab, Amit Raina, Aditya Baliyan, and Suraiya Parvin. The Awakening is the first part of the Junglemahal Trilogy.

== Plot ==
Loosely based on real incidents that unfolded during the mid-80s monsoon season amidst the uprising of Naxalites in the eastern ghat range, a group of travellers courageously ventures through the dense forests, their objective to reach the safety of nearby rescue camps. However, as they navigate the treacherous terrain, they become ensnared in a web of eerie occurrences that defy explanation. The once serene surroundings begin to unravel, revealing a place that is far from what it initially appeared to be. Amidst their journey, they stumble upon an abandoned building, its dilapidated façade holding secrets of its own. Little do they know that within the crumbling walls, restless spirits lurk, haunting the desolate structure and heightening the group's fears as they struggle to distinguish between the physical dangers and the supernatural forces that surround them.

== Cast ==
- Aditya Baliyan
- Amit Raina
- Suraiya Parveen
- Masoomeh Ab
- Farhad Khairy
- Prashant Shinde

== Release ==
The film released on 20 January 2023 with positive reviews and was a sleeper hit.

== Reception ==
One critic stated, "Finally a Hindi movie that will give us sleepless nights. It is on par with Hollywood standards. Aditya Baliyan is at his best, Masoomeh's support to the lead was nice to watch, Suraiya Parvin was natural and really impressive."
