= C. H. Atma =

C.H. Atma
- Born: Atma Hashmatrai Chainani; December 3, 1923; Hyderabad (Sind), now in Pakistan
- Died: 6 December 1975 (aged 52)
- Occupations: Playback singer, Ghazal singer and film actor
- Years active: 1945 – 1975
- Spouse: Not known (divorced)

C.H. Atma (born Atma Hashmatrai Chainani; 3 December 1923 - 6 December 1975) was a playback singer in Hindi language films, ghazal singer and film actor. He was born in 1923 in Hyderabad (Sind), now in Pakistan. His real name was Atma Hashmatrai Chainani. He was a part of the first playback singers' troupe from India to tour and sing outside India in Nairobi, East Africa in 1957, the star of the troupe being Talat Mahmood. He fell ill after his singing tour to England in 1975 and died eight months later on 6 December 1975, aged 52.

== Career ==
C.H. Atma debuted in 1945. His evergreen song is 'Preetam Aan Milo', which he sang in 1945 for a private album. In 1955, the same song was sung by Geeta Dutt for the film, Mr. & Mrs. '55 for composer O. P. Nayyar, who was a great fan of his singing. His voice was quite similar to K. L. Saigal. But he had his own unique style which he applied to become one of the very few singers to become extensively popular both in film and non-film music.

His best known pieces include his solo and duet songs with Geeta Dutt in O.P. Nayyar debut film Aasmaan (1952), and his non-film recording of "Preetam Aan Milo".

C. H. Atma sang a ghazal in Film Geet Gaya Patharon Ne directed by V. Shantaram. He also sang three songs for Film Nagina whose music was composed by Shankar-Jaikishan. In both Nagina (1951) and Aasmaan (1952), he playbacked for Nasir Khan on screen.

He has sung duets with singers like Lata Mangeshkar and Asha Bhosle. But his career was short in Bollywood as brief as just 10 years.

He also acted in two movies as hero, namely, Bhaisahab (1954) (with Purnima and Smriti Biswas) and Bilwamangal (with Suraiya) (1954) besides acting as a character artist in Geet Gaya Pattharon Ne (1964).

== Personal life ==
C.H. Atma was the elder brother of the popular singer, Chandru Atma.

He was not happy that the industry did not utilize his voice properly, reports say. His married life was not happy either.

== Additional Reading ==
https://www.cinemaazi.com/people/c-h-atma
