= Diwana (1952 film) =

- Directed by: Abdur Rashid Kardar
- Written by: Jagdish Kanwal
- Story by: S. N. Banerji
- Produced by: Abdur Rashid Kardar
- Starring: Suraiya; Sumitra; Suresh; Shyam Kumar; Ramesh; Madan Puri
- Cinematography: Dwarka Divecha; Art by: M. R. Achrekar
- Edited by: M. S. Hajee
- Music by: Naushad Ali
- Production company: Kardar Productions
- Distributed by: Kardar Productions
- Release date: 21 May 1952
- Country: India
- Language: Hindi

Diwana is a 1952 Bollywood romantic drama movie directed and produced by Abdur Rashid Kardar. It was written by S. N. Banerji and edited by M. S. Hajee. It narrates the tragic love story of a prince and a nomadic woman who marry each other, become separated and when they finally reunite together they find themselves bereaved at the loss of their only son. It stars Suraiya, Sumitra and Suresh in the leading roles, with Shyam Kumar, Ramesh, Madan Puri, S N Banerji, Amirbai Karnataki, Mumtazbai, Neelambai and Amir Bano in supporting roles. The dialogues of this film were written by Jagdish Kanwal. The music was composed by the renowned musician Naushad Ali, with lyrics penned by Shakeel Badayuni.

The film went on to become a huge success and celebrated a Silver Jubilee.

== Plot ==
A young prince named Ashok falls in love with a girl named Lali whom he encounters for the first time while hunting in a forest. Later on he learns that Lali belongs to a nomadic community that inhabits his region. Ashok meets Lali again and both confess that they are in love with each other. In the meantime Lali's father, who is the head of his community, sends a man named Phulwa to look for her. Phulwa discovers Lali with Prince Ashok. As he has always desired Lali as his better half, he gets jealous and enraged on seeing Lali close the prince. He attacks Ashok, but gets overpowered by him and runs away. Lali becomes upset and fears that Phulwa will take his revenge on them. Phulwa returns to Lali's father and lies to him that Lali has no guts to face her father anymore as she has lost her virginity to the prince, whom he has knocked down on the spot. Lali's father believes what Phulwa has said and orders his gang, along with Phulwa to rob the regal coffer to avenge this insult.

In the meantime, Ashok and Lali marry and go to meet Lali's father. Her father does not assent to this marriage, considering the fact that their class distinction will be an obstacle in the course of the relationship; besides, he is the one who has ordered the robbing of the coffer. He tells them that he has no objection to this marriage if the queens of the palace can accept Lali as their daughter-in-law, and the prince at first needs to go back to his palace to learn whether Lali will be accepted or not. After Ashok leaves, Lali's father instructs his tribe to pack up and resume their march, leaving Lali behind. Ashok resolves to leave his palace forever and spend the rest of his life with Lali and her community when he learns that she will not be accepted by the queens. He goes back to Lali who was waiting for him to return, and soon they join the march. During the trip, Phulwa replaces Ashok's water bottle with a bottle of poisoned water. Ashok gets thirsty, and Lali, unaware of the fact, gives him that bottle of poisoned water. Ashok falls sick and Lali cannot understand how it happened. The queens, along with cavalry, spot Kumar and Lali. They accuse Lali of having given him the poison. They take Kumar back with them leaving her behind. Kumar is saved ultimately. When he regains his consciousness, the queens misinterpret to him that Lali has given him the poison because all she wanted to have is his wealth, but not his love.

Ashok reluctantly marries Mangala, the beautiful princess of Thakur Amar Singh. Mangala discovers that Ashok is already married to Lali. She feels as if she has been cheated and informs her father of this. Her father comes to retrieve her, but Ashok shoots an arrow in his back to counteract him. Hence Mangala is compelled to stay with Ashok.

Lali gives birth to a boy whose father is Ashok, actually. She names her son Ratan and tells him all about her past. One night Ratan meets his somnambulist father in the forest. He saves his father by killing a snake that was about to bite him. The King's men are there at once and they take Ratan to Queen Mangala. Mangala confesses her earnest gratitude towards him for saving her husband's life. She employs Ratan on his request. Ratan befriends Mangala's son. Eventually Mangala gets too fond of Ratan, and Ashok finds it irritating. Ratan meets with an accident while carrying the coffer upstairs. He falls down and has a severe injury to his head. Before his death, Ratan discloses that he is Ashok and Lali's son and his mother never gave the poison. Ashok is heartbroken again. He goes to Lali with the corpse of Ratan and they lament together on the death of their son. After the corpse of their son is cremated, Ashok returns to his palace with Lali on his side. At the door he meets an enraged Mangala with a sword in her hand. She argues that Ashok will have to leave Lali behind if he wants to stay in his palace, because Lali does not belong to the standard to stay there. Ashok counter-argues that as long as everything is his property he has the complete right to decide who will stay in his palace. Lali cannot stand this disquietude anymore. She leaves without uttering a single word and Ashok follows her.

== Cast ==
- Suraiya as Laali
- Sumitra as Mangala
- Suresh as Ashok
- Hridaynath Mangeshkar as Ratan
- Madan Puri as Phulwa
- Rattan Kumar
- Amirbai Karnataki
- Mumtazbai
- Roop Kumar
- Neelambai
- Amir Bano
- Sham Kumar
- Ramesh
- Amir Ali
- Nawab

== Music ==
Deewana

Soundtrack album by Naushad
- Released: 1952
- Genre: Feature film soundtrack

Naushad chronology
Baiju Bawra (1952)	Deewana (1952)	Amar (1954)

The music for the film was composed by renowned musician Naushad Ali, with lyrics penned by Shakeel Badayuni.

Song	Singer(s)
"Tasveer Banata Hoon Teri Khoon-e-Jigar Se..."	Mohammed Rafi
"Dil Mein Aa Gaya Koi..."	Suraiya
"Jeene Diya Na Chain Se..."	Suraiya
"Lagi Hai Mann Mandir Mein Aag..."	Suraiya
"Mora Nazuk Badan Chhue Chanchal Pavan..."	Suraiya
"Mere Chand Mere Lal..."	Suraiya & Lata Mangeshkar
"Teer Khaate Jaayenge Aansoo Bahaate Jaayenge..."	Lata Mangeshkar
"Yeh Duniya Kaisi Hai Bhagwan..."	Hridaynath Mangeshkar

== Trivia ==
- Nai Duniya (1942) was the first film directed by A. R. Kardar that featured Naushad Ali's music. Naushad went on to become the staple music director for every film Kardar directed over the next decade. Diwana was the last film together in this stretch. Kardar used other music directors for his next few films till he took a break in 1958. When he made a comeback a few years later, he used Naushad one last time in Dil Diya Dard Liya (1966). The two worked together in 14 films overall.
- The song "Yeh Duniya Kaisi Hai Bhagwan..." was sung by Hridaynath Mangeshkar in 1952 at the age of 15. This song along with "Badlegi Yeh Duniya Ek Din Badlegi..." (Sanskar (1952)) and "Sancho Tero Naam Ram..." (Baiju Bawra (1952)) were his first Hindi film songs.
