= Abdur Rashid Kardar =

Indian film actor and director

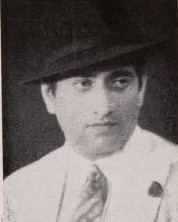
- Born: 2 October 1904; Lahore, Punjab, British India (present-day Pakistan)
- Died: 22 November 1989 (aged 85); Mumbai, Maharashtra, India
- Occupations: Film Director, Film Producer
- Organization: Bollywood
- Spouse: Akhtar Sultana Kardar

Abdur Rashid Kardar (2 October 1904 – 22 November 1989) was an Indian film actor, director and producer. He is credited with establishing the film industry in the Bhati Gate locality of Lahore, British India (now in Pakistan).

== Early life and career ==
A.R. Kardar was born into famous Arain Zaildar family of Bhaati Gate in Lahore called the Kardars. Cricket legend and first captain of Pakistan cricket team Abdul Hafeez Kardar.

Kardar started as an arts scholar and a calligraphist making posters for foreign film productions and writing for newspapers of the early 1920s. His work would often lead him to meet filmmakers around India.

In 1928, the first silent film, The Daughters of Today was released in Lahore at a time when the city only had nine operational cinema houses. Most of the films shown in theatres in Lahore were either made in Bombay or Calcuta, besides ones made in Hollywood or London. The Daughters of Today was the brain-child of G.K. Mehta, a former officer with the North-Western Railway, who had imported a camera into the country for this very project from London. He asked Kardar to assist him as an assistant director on the project and ended up giving Kardar his début role in his film as an actor. Muhammad Ismail, his friend and fellow calligraphist, accompanied Kardar in the making of the film.

The film was produced in the first open studio in the city near the Bradlaw Hall. It is believed that some other films had been produced indigenously at the studios which had to be closed down for financial reasons. After finishing shooting for the film, Kardar was not approached for another role for a long time. Hailing from the Bhati Gate locality, where it was not unusual to find writers and poets, Kardar saw a viable future for a film industry.

== Laying foundations for a film industry ==
In 1928, with no work left after their maiden venture, Kardar and Ismail sold their belongings to set up a studio and production company under the name of United Players Corporation, the foundation stone for the film industry in Lahore. After scouting for locations, they settled for their offices to be established at Ravi Road. Although, the dim-lit area presented with much difficulties after the studios were established. Shootings were only possible in the day-light but nevertheless the area had some very important landmarks like the Ravi Forest and the tombs of Mughal emperor Jahangir and his wife Nur Jahan, the queen.

It is reported that the team working at the studios would commute on tangas and even lost equipment once while travelling on the bumpy roads on the horse-drawn carriage. However basic and crude their working conditions, Kardar believed in his work and in 1930 he produced the first film under the studio's banner.

With this film, Husn Ka Daku a.k.a. Mysterious Eagle, Kardar made his first directorial début. He also cast himself as an actor in the male lead opposite Gulzar Begum with Ismail in a supporting role. The film featured an American actor, Iris Crawford, as well. The film had mild success at theatres but prominently established Lahore as a functioning film industry. Kardar vowed on not acting in any other film and instead focusing on direction.

Immediately afterwards the studio released the film Sarfarosh aka Brave Heart, with Gul Hamid playing the lead rold with more or less the same cast as in the previous film. This production proved equally appealing but was able to stir noise about this industry in film production circles throughout India. Roop Lal Shori, a resident of Brandreth Road in Lahore, upon hearing of a new film industry in the city, returned to his hometown. He later produced Qismat Ke Haer Pher aka Life After Death which would firmly ground the new industry's reputation as being in line with other film industries of the time.

== Setting up of Kardar Productions ==
Kardar shifted to Calcutta in 1930; and joined the East India Film Company, where he made about seven films for them. After the company closed down in 1937 he moved to Bombay and joined Film City (in Tardeo) where he made one film Baaghban. It won the Gohar Gold Medal starring Bimla Kumari, B. Nandrekar and Sitara Devi.

Subsequently, he joined Ranjeet Movietone towards the end of 1937 and made only three movies with them. From here he moved to Circo Productions Ltd., but just one year later, in 1939, when Circo Productions Ltd. went into liquidation Kardar bought out the company and started Kardar Productions. In the same compound, he also started Kardar Studios and started making movies under the Kardar Productions banner from 1940 onwards. Kardar Studios was one of the best equipped studios in those days and also the first to have air-conditioned make up rooms. "During his long career, A. R. Kardar worked his way up the ladder from a poster-maker to a studio owner".

== Later years ==
In 1946, Kardar gave a commercially successful film with K. L. Saigal and composer Naushad, Shahjehan (1946). Claimed as a "masterpiece", all songs of the film songs became hits.

Following partition in 1947, A. R. Kardar and his brother-in-law Mehboob Khan both left for Pakistan. However, according to Bunny Reuben, as quoted by Mihir Bose, they returned to India, but no reason was given for their return.

Kardar went back to film making and directed Dard (1947), which starred Suraiya and had music by Naushad. Dillagi (1949), a romantic tragedy, was a commercial success at the box-office. Inspired by Wuthering Heights (1939), Kardar later used the plot in Dil Diya Dard Liya (1966). Dillagi's music by Naushad became extremely popular, especially Suraiya's song "Tu Mera Chand". Dulari (1949) had equally popular music, with a memorable Mohammed Rafi song "Suhani Raat Dhal Chuki". It starred Geeta Bali, Madhubala and Suresh (not Shyam as people mistakenly put his name). Suresh used to be a child artist and has acted in several films like Basant (starring Mumtaz Shanti, Ulhaas and baby Madhubala then).

Dastan (1950) a tragic melodrama, was inspired from the film Enchantment, and was cited as "one of the biggest commercial hits". Jadoo (1951) and Deewana (1952) marked the parting of ways between Kardar and Naushad. Dil-E-Nadaan (1953) had popular music by Ghulam Mohammed. He made three more films before starting Dil Diya Dard Liya (1966), which again had music by Naushad. Kardar's last film was Mere Sartaj (1975).

== Contributions ==
He introduced many artists to the Hindi film industry who went on to become renowned in their own right, such as Naushad, Majrooh Sultanpuri, Suraiya and the actor/producer/director Nazir Ahmed Khan who migrated to Pakistan in 1947 and became one of the founders of the Pakistani film industry. The legendary singer Mohammad Rafi got his first hit from the song, 'Suhani raat dhal chuki' – from Kardar's film Dulari (1949). He also started the Kardar-Kolynos Contest, to find new talent and through this contest he discovered and introduced to the industry, Chand Usmani and Mahendra Kapoor.

== Family and death ==
Kardar married twice. His first wife was Akhtar Sultana Kardar. They had some children together (number unclear), including one son, who was the eldest of Kardar's children. The son died at the age of three. Akhtar Sultana Kardar died in 1988, one year before her husband.

Kardar's second wife was Bahar, whose sister, Sardar, was the second wife of film maker Mehboob Khan. It is unclear how many children Kardar had with Bahar. However, in all, Kardar had six daughters and one son. The son died in infancy. Five of Kardar's daughters are married and live abroad. Only the youngest daughter, Yasmin Kardar, lives in India. She looks after the distribution rights of her father's films.

Kardar, who lived at Marine Drive, died at the age of 85, on 22 November 1989, in Mumbai, Maharashtra. Kardar's daughter Yasmin is quoted as saying, "The press once told me that my father lived and breathed films".

Kardar was the step-brother of Pakistan's famous cricketer A. H. Kardar (Abdul Hafeez Kardar).

== Awards ==
- Indian Motion Pictures' Producers Association (IMPPA) Award for his outstanding contribution to Indian cinema.

== Filmography ==
=== As a film director ===
- 1930 Husn Ka Daku
- 1930 Sarfarosh
- 1930 Safdar Jung
- 1930 Farebi Shahzada
- 1931 Farebi Daku
- 1931 Khooni Katar
- 1932 Heer Ranjha, Heer Ranjha was the first punjabi talkie film to be created in Punjab
- 1933 Aurat Ka Pyar
- 1934 Chandragupta
- 1934 Sultana
- 1935 Swarg Ki Seedhi
- 1936 Baghi Sipahi
- 1937 Mandir
- 1937 Milap
- 1938 Baghban
- 1939 Thokar
- 1940 Holi
- 1940 Pagal
- 1940 Pooja
- 1941 Swami
- 1942 Nai Duniya
- 1942 Sharda
- 1943 Kanoon
- 1943 Sanjog
- 1944 Pehle Aap
- 1945 Sanyasi
- 1946 Shahjehan
- 1947 Dard
- 1949 Dillagi
- 1949 Dulari
- 1950 Dastan
- 1951 Jadoo
- 1952 Deewana
- 1953 Dil-E-Nadaan
- 1955 Baap Re Baap
- 1955 Yasmin
- 1958 Do Phool
- 1966 Dil Diya Dard Liya
- 1975 Mere Sartaj

=== As a film producer ===
- 1931 Bhatakta Joban a.k.a. Awara Raqasa/Wandering Dancer (producer), directed by J. K. Nanda
- 1941 Kurmai (A Punjabi language film)
- 1944 Geet a.k.a. The Song (producer)
- 1947 Dard (producer)

=== As a writer ===
- 1938 Baghban (dialogue / screenplay)
- 1940 Pagal (story)

=== As an actor ===
- 1928 Daughters of Today
- 1929 Husn Ka Daku
- 1929 Heer Ranjha

=== As an assistant film director ===
- 1928 Daughters of Today (assistant director)

== Trivia ==
Recently some photographs by Life magazine's James Burke emerged which showed the prevalence of the casting couch in the Hindi Film Industry way back in the 1950s as well. Kardar was auditioning young women for roles in his films and the photographs showed the women posing in front of him in various stages of undress.

== See also ==
- A. J. Kardar
