= Shama Dulari =

Indian actress and dancer

- Occupations: Actress, Dancer
- Years active: 1940s to early 1950s
- Known for: Small and big roles
- Notable work: Shair (1949), Shahzadi (1941)

Shama Dulari is an Indian actress and dancer. She acted in the 1940s to the early 1950s and is often confused with actresses Shyama and Dulari as her name is separated instead of one word. She has lived in Bombay after her film career ended in 1952.

== Filmography ==
- Shahzadi (1941)
- Meera Bai (1947)
- Shair (1949)
- Rangila Rajasthan (1949)
- Jan Pahechan (1950)
- Nili (1950)
- Bhule Bhatke (1952)
