= Veena (actress) =

Indian film actress (1926 - 2004)

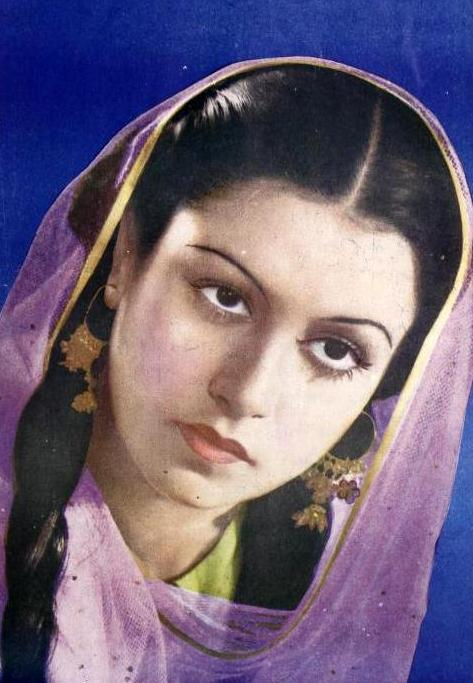
- Born: Tajour Sultana; 4 July 1926; Quetta, Baluchistan Agency, British India (present-day Balochistan, Pakistan)
- Died: 14 November 2004 (aged 78); Mumbai, Maharashtra, India
- Occupation: Actress
- Years active: 1939 – 1983
- Spouse: Al Nasir (m. 1947; died 1957)
- Children: 2

Veena (née Tajour Sultana; 4 July 1926 – 14 November 2004), also known as Veena Kumari, was an Indian actress appeared in over 70 feature films in a career spanning 41 years.

== Early life and background ==
Veena was born as Tajour Sultana on 4 July 1926 in Quetta, Baluchistan Agency, British India. Later, her family moved to Lahore and they lived there for an extended period of time.

She married actor-hero Al Nasir in 1947 in Junagadh and had two children with him. Al Nasir was from a royal family in Bhopal and had already been married, first to actress Meena Shorey and then to Manorama. They both worked together in a few films but their films flopped at the box-office. Al Nasir died in 1957 due to tetanus.

== Career ==
Veena started out playing heroine roles in pre-partition films. She made her debut with Garib and Gawandhi (1942) at around sixteen years of age. Garib was made in Urdu and Gawandhi was made in Punjabi and directed by Mehboob Khan. In Garib, she played the role of Lata and in Gawandhi she played heroine opposite Shyam, who played the hero.

She became known for her roles in pre-partition Hindi and Urdu films. Her early years in films came with films such as Najma (1943), Phool (1945) and Humayun (1945). Her last film before the Partition of India was Rajputani (1946), in which she played a supporting role. She decided to remain in India after the partition in 1947 and acted through the mid-to-late-1940s, 1950s, 1960s, 1970s and early 1980s.

She played roles in big productions such as Halaku (1956), Chalti Ka Naam Gaadi (1958), Kaagaz Ke Phool (1959), Taj Mahal (1963), Do Raaste (1969) and Pakeezah (1972). She retired in 1983 after the release of Razia Sultan (1983) in which she played Empress Shah Turkhan.

== Death ==
Veena died in Bombay on 14 November 2004 after 21 years of retirement when she was 78 years old after suffering from a protracted illness. She had appeared in over 70 feature films in a career spanning 41 years (1942 – 1983).

== Filmography ==
Year	Film	Character/Role	Notes
1988	Hamara Khandaan		Last and Final film Role
1986	Mazloom		
1983	Razia Sultan	Empress Shah Turkhan	
1981	Agni Pareeksha (1981 film)	Karuna Choudhary	
1981	Khawaja Ki Diwani		
1980	Payal Ki Jhankaar		
1978	Satyam Shivam Sundaram		
1978	Nawab Sahib	Farida	
1977	Jay Vejay	Chandeli	
1977	Shatranj Ke Khilari	Queen Mother	
1974	Dukh Bhanjan Tera Naam	Rani Sheela	
1974	5 Rifles	Maharani	
1974	Pran Jaye Par Vachan Na Jaye	Raja's mother	
1973	Jheel Ke Us Paar	Mrs. Kulwant Rai 'Rani Maa'	
1973	Chhupa Rustam	Mrs. Rajendra Jain	
1973	Banrasi Babu	Mohan's Mother	
1973	Mere Gharib Nawaz	Begum Baig	
1972	Parichay	Sati Devi	
1972	Pakeezah	Nawabjaan	
1972	Shehzada	Rajlaxmi	
1970	Heer Raanjha		
1970	Nanak Naam Jahaz Hai		
1970	Naya Raasta	Rukmini	
1969	Do Raaste	Mrs. Gupta, Satyan's mother	
1969	Anmol Moti		
1968	Aashirwad	Leela S. Choudhary	
1968	Saathi	Rajni's Mother	
1968	Shrimanji		
1967	Chhoti Si Mulaqat	Shanker's wife	
1967	Noor Jehan		
1966	Sannata		
1966	Alibaba Aur 40 Chor (1966 film)	Razia, Ali Baba's older sister	
1965	Sikandar-E-Azam	Sikandar's mother	
1964	Baghi		
1964	Shehnai		
1963	Phir Wohi Dil Laya Hoon	Jamuna	
1963	Taj Mahal	Malka-E-Alam Noor Jehan/Mehrunissa	
1959	Chhoti Bahen	Yashoda	
1959	Kaagaz Ke Phool	Veena Varma/Veena Sinha	
1958	Chalti Ka Naam Gaadi	Kamini	
1958	Mehndi		
1957	Mera Salaam		
1957	Mumtaz Mahal		
1957	Naya Zamana		
1956	Halaku	Maharani	
1952	Aasmaan		
1952	Annadata		
1951	Afsana	Meera	
1951	Kashmir		
1950	Dastan	Rani	
1947	Chheen Le Azadi	Madhvi	
1946	Rajputani		
1945	Humayun	Rajkumari (as Veena Kumari)	
1945	Phool		
1943	Najma	Najma (Nawab's daughter)	
1942	Garib	Lata (as Veena Kumari)	
1939	Swastik		
