= D.D. Kashyap =

Dharam Dev Kashyap
- Born: 1910; Jalalpur, Uttar Pradesh, British India
- Died: 5 May 1988 (aged 77–78); Bombay, Maharashtra, India
- Occupations: Director, screenwriter, producer
- Years active: 1939–1967

Dharam Dev Kashyap (1910– 5 May 1988) was an Indian film director, screenwriter and film producer. He was often credited as D. D. Kashyap.

== Filmography ==
Year	Name	Role
1939	Life's for Living: Aadmi	Writer
1941	Padosi	Actor, assistant director
1942	10 O'Clock	Writer
1943	Nai Kahani	Director
1944	Chand	Director, writer
1946	Nargis	Director
1948	Aaj Ki Raat	Director
1949	Bari Behen	Director, producer, writer
1950	Kamal Ke Phool	Director
1951	Aaram	Director, producer
1951	Do Sitare	Director
1952	Badnam	Director
1953	Naya Ghar	Director
1954	Shama Parwana	Director, producer
1956	Aan Baan	Director
1956	Halaku	Director
1961	Maya	Director, writer
1967	Dulhan Ek Raat Ki	Director, writer
