= Nai Kahani =

- Directed by: D.D. Kashyap
- Release date: 1943
- Country: India
- Language: Hindi

Nai Kahani is a Bollywood film. It was released in 1943.
