= Mere Sartaj =

- मेरे सरताज
- Directed by: Abdul Rashid Kardar
- Starring: Nazir Hussain; Alka
- Music by: Ravi
- Release date: 1975
- Country: India
- Language: Hindi

Mere Sartaj is a 1975 Bollywood film directed by Abdul Rashid Kardar.

== Cast ==
- Alka as Sultana
- Nazir Hussain as Parveen's dad
- Jagdeep as Munir-Ul-Haq Qadri
- Trilok Kapoor as Thakur Kaka
- Satish Kaul as Javed Ahmed Gulrez
- Padma Khanna as Shabab Bano
- Roopesh Kumar as Asad
- Nadira as Gulshanbai
- Zaheera as Parveen J. Gulrez
- Helen as Dancer / Singer at Angel Club

== Soundtrack ==
Music composed by Ravi with lyrics by Abdul Malam Mughal .

1. "Jhooka Jhooka Ke Yeh Nazar Yoon Uthaai Jaati Hai" – Mohd. Rafi
2. "Main Hoon Dukhatar-E-Angur Mast Banaana Rang" – Asha Bhosle
3. "Mera Sab Kuchh Hai Ae Dilruba Tumhaare Liye" – Asha Bhosle
4. "Sitamgar Kaafilon Ko Zulm Dha Kar Loot Lete Hain" – Asha Bhosle
