= Dillagi (1949 film) =

1949 film from India

- Film poster
- Directed by: A. R. Kardar
- Written by: Azm Bazidpuri
- Story by: Azm Bazidpuri
- Produced by: A. R. Kardar
- Starring: Suraiya; Shyam
- Cinematography: Dwarka Divecha (as Dwarkadas Divecha)
- Edited by: G. G. Mayekar
- Music by: Naushad
- Production company: Kardar Productions
- Distributed by: Kardar Productions
- Release date: 1949
- Country: India
- Language: Hindustani

Dillagi (transl. The Jest) is a 1949 Indian Bollywood film. The film was produced and directed by A. R. Kardar for his "Kardar Productions", and had music composed by Naushad. The film starred Suraiya and Shyam, alongside Chandabai, Sharda, Amar, Yasmin and Amir Banu. The story was a romantic tragedy and became commercially successful, being the fourth highest grossing film of the year.

The plot was adapted from Wuthering Heights directed by William Wyler. Kardar later use a similar theme in Dil Diya Dard Liya (1966). Deepa Gahlot added the film in her book 50 Films that Deserve a New Audience.

== Cast ==
- Suraiya as Mala
- Shyam as Swaroop
- Yasmin as Sehti
- Sharda as Mala's friend
- Sham Kumar as Jyoti
- Amir Bano as Shankari, Swaroop's sister in law
- Agha Mehraj as Biharilal, Mala's father
- Gulam Hasan as Swaroop's brother
- Baby Shyama as Paro, Jyoti's sister
- Gulzar as Swaroop's mother
- M.A. Shah as Swaroop's father
- Chanda Bai as Fake Bride
- Amar as Popatlal, Mala's uncle

== Soundtrack ==
The music was composed by Naushad and it had Shakeel Badayuni as the film songs lyricist. Suraiya's song "Tu Mera Chand" became a popular number, while Mohammed Rafi's "Is Duniya Mein Ae Dilwalo" also became "extremely popular". Two other notable songs termed as "evergreen hits" by Suraiya were, "Char Din Ki Chandni" and "Nirala Mohabbat Ka Dastur Dekha". The singers were Suraiya, Mohammed Rafi, Shamshad Begum, Uma Devi and Shyam.

=== Tracklist ===
No.	Title	Singer
1	"Tu Mera Chand Mein Teri Chandani " (solo)	Geeta Dutt
2	"Is Duniya Mein Dil Ka Lagana Kheil Nahin"	Mohammed Rafi
3	"Murliwale Murli Baja"	Suraiya
4	"Char Din Ki Chandni Thi Phir Andheri Raat Hai"	Suraiya
5	"Duniya Kya Jaane"	Suraiya
6	"Nirala Mohabbat Kaa Dastur Dekha"	Suraiya
7	"Tera Khayal Dil Se Bhulaya Na Jayega"	Suraiya
8	"Le Ke Dil Chupke Se Kiya Majboor"	Suraiya
9	"Tu Mera Chand, Mein Teri Chandani" (duet)	Shyam, Suraiya
10	"Tere Koche Mein Armaano Ki Duniya"	Mohammed Rafi
11	"De Dhil De Dhil O Ree Sakhi"	Uma Devi, Shamshad Begum
12	"Zalim Jamana Mujh ko"	Shyam, Suraiya

== Legacy ==
Dillagi is cited among the best romantic films of the 1940s. It was one of Suraiya's biggest success and made her a star. Dharmendra has watched the film 40 times and terms it his favourite Suraiya's film. In 2021, National Film Archive of India, Pune added the film its collection. Deepa Gahlot praised the film and added it in her book 50 Films that Deserve a New Audience.
