= Dard (1947 film) =

1947 film

- Directed by: Abdul Rashid Kardar
- Written by: Rais Ahmed Jaffri; Azm Bazidpuri
- Story by: Rais Ahmed Jaffri
- Produced by: Abdul Rashid Kardar
- Starring: Munawwar Sultana; Suraiya; Nusrat; Husn Banu
- Cinematography: Sailen Bose
- Edited by: Moosa Mansoor
- Music by: Naushad
- Production company: Kardar Productions
- Distributed by: Kardar Productions
- Release date: 1947
- Country: India
- Language: Hindi

Dard (Pain) is a 1947 Bollywood drama film directed by Abdul Rashid Kardar. The film was produced by Kardar Productions.

== Review and reception ==
It was a surprise "musical hit" at the box office as it had an ordinary (for then) star cast. Suraiya played the second lead, with Munawwar Sultana as the main heroine. The film was Suraiya's first "big hit", becoming a popular singing star following the success of the film. The hero of the film was Kardar's brother Nusrat (Kardar), who shifted to Pakistan following Partition in 1947, where he acted in a few films.

The music director was Naushad who composed the "hit" songs for the film, which continue to remain popular. The lyricist was Shakeel Badayuni, an "accomplished Urdu poet" who had arrived in Mumbai in 1946, to write songs for Hindi films. He was signed by Naushad and Kardar to write the lyrics for Dard. His "Afsana Likh Rahi Hoon" (I Am Writing A Tale) sung by Uma Devi went on to become successful as did the other songs from the film.

Dard was a Muslim social romantic melodrama which involved a love triangle in the form of two girls, Munnawwar Sultana and Suraiya, both in love with a doctor played by Nusrat.

== Plot ==
Nawab Sahib (Badri Prasad) lives with his wife, the Begum (Pratima Devi) and their young daughter Suraiya (Munawwar Sultana). While attending a function at an orphanage, he becomes impressed by a student, Iqbal (Nusrat) and brings him home. After some initial friction Suraiya and the boy become friends. Iqbal grows up to become a doctor while Suraiya falls in love with him and gifts him a big diamond ring. A friend (Husn Banu) of Suraiya's takes great pleasure in teasing the two, which Suraiya doesn't mind but is frowned upon by Iqbal.

Iqbal decides to serve at a village where there is an outbreak of plague. Here he meets Hamida (Suraiya) and the two fall in love in-between his ministrations to the sick. One of the villagers, Dilawar (Shyam Kumar), is a suitor of Hamida's and is jealous of the growing affection between Hamida and Iqbal. Dilawar blackmails Iqbal about their romance, threatening to inform Nawab Sahib unless Iqbal gives him Rs. 10, 000. A scared Iqbal gives Dilawar the diamond ring gifted to him by Suraiya. Iqbal falls ill and the Nawab arrives with an ambulance to take him home. Hamida's father is killed by Dilawar, who then proceeds to lie to Hamida, telling her that Iqbal had left the ring for her and gives it to her. Hamida accepts it and wears it on her finger.

Hamida is taken in by the Nawab who brings her back to his house. Misunderstandings arise between Iqbal and Hamida when he sees the ring. The two however get back together again with their differences are resolved. Meanwhile, Suraiya shows symptoms of consumption, with coughing and fever. A marriage is arranged between her and Iqbal. Suraiya finds out about their love and she sacrifices her love for the two and dies.

== Cast ==
- Munawwar Sultana as Suraiya, Nawab Sahib's daughter and in love with Iqbal
- Suraiya as Hamida, a village girl who falls in love with Dr. Iqbal
- Nusrat as Dr. Iqbal
- Shyam Kumar as the village bad-guy Dilawar
- Badri Prasad as the benevolent wealthy Nawab Sahib
- Husn Bano as Suraiya's friend Zubeida
- Pratima Devi as Nawab's wife, Begum

== Music ==
The film was a big musical hit which catapulted the music director Naushad to great heights, and promoted the career of Shakeel Badayuni, who wrote the lyrics of the hit songs. Dard had music composed by Naushad. According to Bharatan, Naushad was accorded recognition for "Urdu-oriented classicality" in his music composition for Shahjehan (1946) and Dard by Indian Film Journalists' Association, Mysore with a Special Award in 1948.

Suraiya "dominated" the film with "soulful" rendition of her songs like "Beech Bhanwar Mein Aan Phansa Hai" in Raga Darbari, "Dil Dhadke Aankh Meri Phadke" and "Hum Thay Tumhare Tum Thay Humare". All of her songs became "hits" with the audiences. Suraiya's duet with Uma Devi, "Betaab Hai Dil" is counted as one of her top twenty songs.

Shamshad Begum had become extremely popular in the three years following Anmol Ghadi (1946), singing under Naushad's direction. One of her popular songs for Naushad from Dard was "Hum Dard Ka Afsana". Her other popular song from the film was "Yeh Afsana Nahin Zalim".

Uma Devi, later to become famous as the comedian Tun Tun, was a Naushad discovery. She came to the Hindi film industry to become an actress, Naushad gave her some classic songs to sing in Dard, which continue to remain popular. He later advised her to try her luck as a comedian in films. She gave playback singing for Munawwar Sultana for three numbers in Dard, all of which went on to become successful. Her biggest hit was "Afsana Likh Rahi Hoon" picturized on Sultana in the film. The other two solos were "Aaj Machi Hai Dhoom Jhoom Khushi Mein Jhoom" and "Yeh Kaun Chala Yeh Kaun Chala".

== Soundtrack ==
The music director was Naushad with film songs lyrics by Shakeel Badayuni. The singers were Shamshad Begum, Suraiya and Uma Devi.

=== Song list ===
#	Title	Singer
1	"Afsana Likh Rahi Hoon"	Uma Devi
2	"Aaj Machi Hai Dhum"	Uma Devi
3	"Yeh Kaun Chala Yeh Kaun Chala"	Uma Devi
4	"Betaab Hai Dil Dard-E-Mohabbat Ke Asar Se"	Uma Devi, Suraiya
5	"Beech Bhanvar Men Aan Phansa Hai"	Suraiya
6	"Dil Dhadke Aankh Meri Phadke"	Suraiya
7	"Hum Thay Tumhare Tum Thay Humare"	Suraiya
8	"Chale Dil Ki Duniya Barbaad Kar Ke"	Suraiya
9	"Yeh Afsana Nahin Zalim Mere Dil Ki Haqeeqat Hai"	Shamshad Begum
10	"Ham Dard Kaa Afsana Duniya Ko Suna Denge"	Shamshad Begum
