= Suraiya =

Indian actress and playback singer (1929–2004)

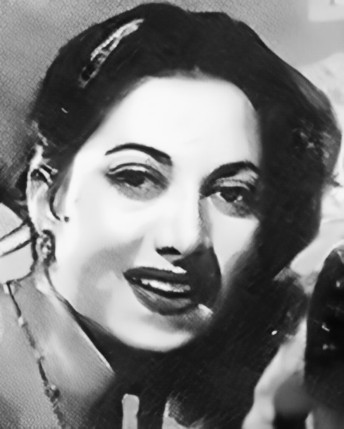
- Suraiya on 2013 stamp of India
- Born: 15 June 1929; Lahore, Punjab, British India (present-day Punjab, Pakistan)
- Died: 31 January 2004 (aged 74); Mumbai, Maharashtra, India
- Resting place: Bada Qabrastan, Marine Lines, Mumbai, Maharashtra, India
- Occupations: Actress; playback singer
- Years active: 1936–1964
- Works: Full list
- Partner: Dev Anand (1948–1951)

Suraiya Jamal Sheikh (15 June 1929 – 31 January 2004), mononymously known as Suraiya, was an Indian actress and playback singer who worked in Hindi films. Regarded as one of the greatest and finest actresses in the history of Indian cinema, she was known for her strong on-screen portrayals in a variety of genres. In a career spanning from 1936 to 1964, Suraiya acted in over 70 films and sang 338 songs. Suraiya was the most celebrated actress between the mid- to late 1940s and early 1950s and was paid more than her male counterparts.

Born in Lahore, Suraiya relocated to Bombay (now Mumbai) with her family when she was 1 year old. Apart from being a great actress, Suraiya was also a renowned playback singer, who mostly sang for herself. She sang her first song for Nai Duniya (1942), when she was only 12 years old. Suraiya made her first appearance as a child artist with the film Madam Fashion (1936), directed by Jaddanbai. She made her acting debut in 1941, with Taj Mahal in which she played the role of Mumtaz Mahal. Suraiya went onto establish herself as one of the leading actresses in Hindi cinema with films such as Ishaara (1943), Tadbir (1943), Phool (1945), Anmol Ghadi (1946), Omar Khaiyyam (1946), Parwana (1947), Dard (1947), Shair (1949), Dastan (1950), Afsar (1950), Diwana (1952), Bilwamangal (1954) and Mr. Lambu (1956).

Suraiya's career marked a significant turning point in 1948–1949 with the highest grossing releases of the year—Vidya (1948), Pyar Ki Jeet (1948), Dillagi (1949) and Badi Behen (1949), that brought her public recognition. Her most notable portrayal was of a tawaif, Moti Begum in Mirza Ghalib (1954), which earned her critical acclaim and praises from two Prime Ministers of India. In her heyday, Suraiya was known as Malika-e-Husn (queen of beauty) and Malika-e-Adakari (queen of acting).

Suraiya's final film release was Rustam Sohrab (1963), after which she took retirement due to poor health. Suraiya received the Screen Lifetime Achievement Award in 1996, for her contribution to Indian cinema. She died on 31 January 2004, after suffering from various ailments, including hypoglycemia, ischaemia and insulinoma.

== Early life ==
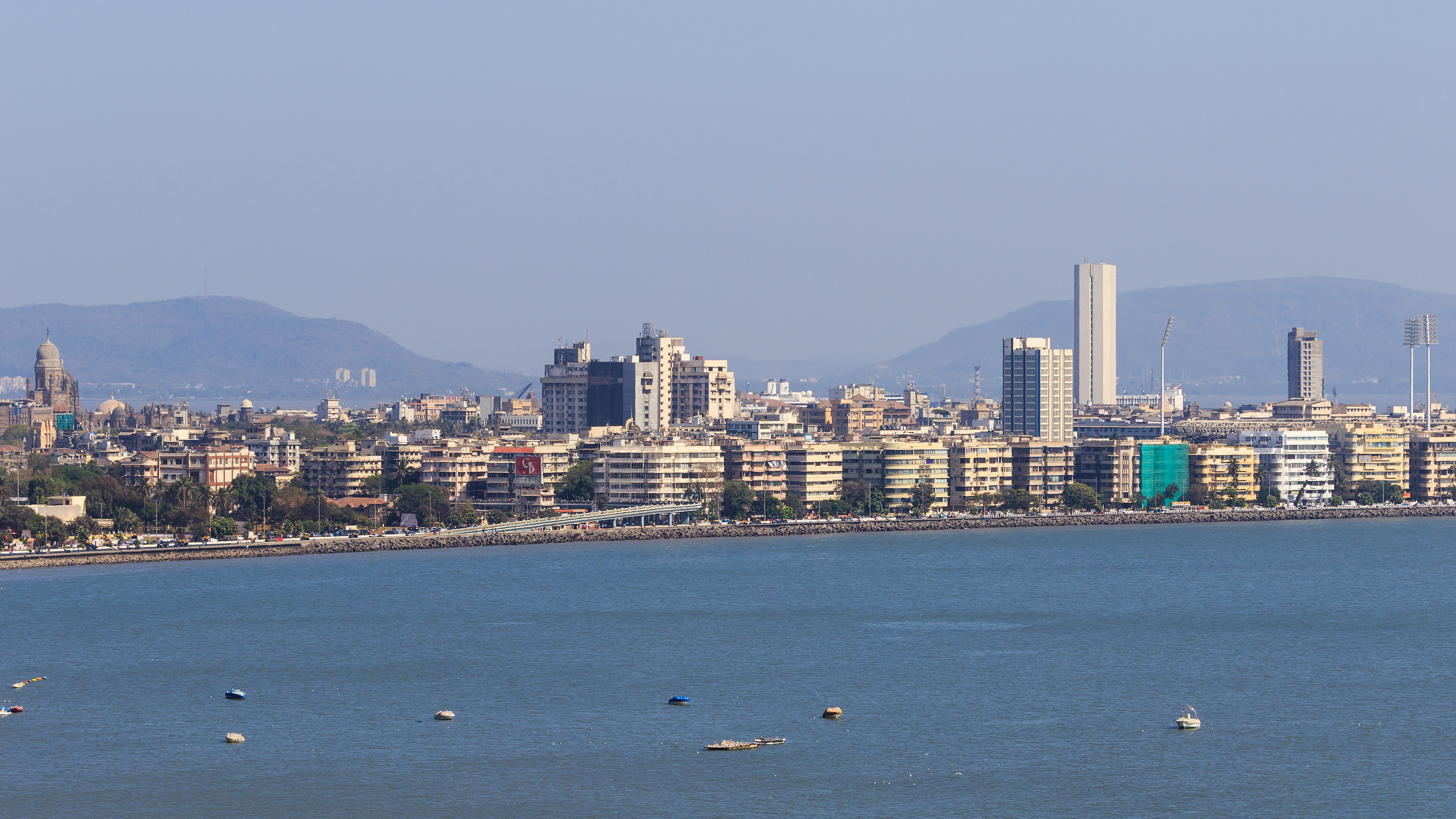
Suraiya was brought up in Mumbai

Suraiya was born as Suraiya Jamal Sheikh on 15 June 1929 in Lahore, British India (now Pakistan), to Aziz Jamal Sheikh and Mumtaz Sheikh. She was one year old, when her family moved to Mumbai (then called Bombay) to reside in Krishna Mahal at Marine Drive. Soon they were joined by her maternal uncle, M. Zahoor, who became a well known villain in the 1930s Bombay film industry and her maternal grandmother, Badshah Begum.

Suraiya belonged to a deeply religious Muslim family. She attended New High School, now known as J.B. Petit High School for Girls, in the Fort district of Bombay. At home, her grandmother gave her religious teachings in Persian. Suraiya's childhood friends included Raj Kapoor and Madan Mohan, with whom she used to sing in children's radio programmes at All India Radio. Suraiya did not have any professional training in music.

Born in an orthodox family, Suraiya was deeply religious and practiced Islam since her childhood. Suraiya was fond of literature, especially Urdu literature and use to read a lot of them.

== Acting career ==
=== Child artist and early work (1936–1943) ===
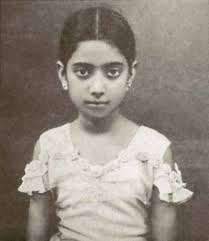
Suraiya in 1936, when she worked as a child artist

Suraiya made her debut as a child actor in Jaddan Bai's Madam Fashion in 1936 as Miss Suraiya. Later, she got a prominent role with the help of her uncle, M. Zahoor. During a holiday from school in 1941, she accompanied him to Bombay's Mohan Studios to see the shooting of the film Taj Mahal, which was being directed by Nanubhai Vakil. Vakil noticed the charm and innocence of young Suraiya and selected her to play the role of Mumtaz Mahal, the film released in 1942 and marked her acting debut.

While she was singing for children's programs for All India Radio (AIR) in Bombay, as a six-year old, Raj Kapoor and Madan Mohan were her co-artists. In fact, they first introduced her to AIR. Both were associated with her later as an adult, as her hero and as her music director respectively in films. At AIR, Zulfiqar Ali Bukhari was at that time the station director at the Bombay radio station. As soon as music director Naushad Ali heard Suraiya's voice, he chose her to sing (at age 13) for Mehtab in Abdul Rashid Kardar's film Sharda (1942). He became Suraiya's mentor and she sang some of the best songs of her career under his baton. Later, he gave a string of hit songs when Suraiya became a full-fledged singing star in Anmol Ghadi (1946), Dard (1947), Dillagi (1949) and Dastaan (1950). As a child artist, Suraiya acted and also sang in the films, Usne Kya Socha (1937), Mother India (1938), Tamanna (1942), and Station Master (1942).

At the age of 14 in 1943, Suraiya appeared as a heroine in J.K. Nanda's film Ishaara, opposite Prithviraj Kapoor. The film was the tenth highest grossing release of the year and marked Suraiya's first commercial success. Devika Rani, who headed the Bombay Talkies production company, seeing Suraiya's blooming brilliance as an actress and as a singer signed her on a five-year contract at Rs. 500 per month with her role in Hamari Baat (1943). In the film, she played the second lead alongside Devika Rani and had a duet dance and her song with Arun Kumar, "Bistar Bicha Diya Hai Tere Ghar Ke Samne" became very popular. It eventually earned her more success and became the eighth highest grossing release of the year.

=== Rise to prominence and success (1944–1947) ===
With no film release in 1944, the year 1945 proved to be a crucial year in Suraiya's career. She had five films that year, including Yateem, Samrat Chandragupta and Main Kya Karoon. The five-year contract was revoked by Devika Rani on Suraiya's request, when K. Asif offered Suraiya Rs. 40,000 for his directorial debut Phool. She played Shama alongside Prithviraj Kapoor. The film Tadbir marked her first film with K. L. Saigal, who liked her voice during a rehearsal of a song for Jayant Desai's film Samrat Chandragupt, in which she was acting. He recommended her to Desai, opposite himself in Tadbir, where she played his lover Saguna. Phool and Tadbir became the fourth and fifth highest-grossing films of the year respectively. Baburao Patel in his review for Filmindia, praised Suraiya as the lead in Tadbir.

The films Jag Biti and 1857 were Suraiya's first two releases of the year 1946. In 1857, that was set against the backdrop of the Indian Rebellion of 1857, she played Tasnim opposite Surendra. Suraiya then acted as the second lead in Mehboob Khan's Anmol Ghadi (1946) with Noor Jehan as the lead with Surendra. She played a willful village girl Basanti. Praising her performance in Anmol Ghadi, Dinesh Raheja of Rediff.com noted: "True to her name Basanti, Suraiya wafts through the film like a rejuvenating spring breeze. She is achingly young and full of beans." Despite Jehan's presence, the film proved to be a major breakthrough for Suraiya. She then reunited with K. L. Saigal in Omar Khaiyyam, playing Mehru. 1857, Anmol Ghadi and Omar Khaiyyam emerged among the year's highest grossing releases and consolidated Suraiya's career.

Suraiya had five film releases in the year of India's independence. She first played the free spirited Gopi, who is suspected to have an affair with a married man in Parwana. Although by then she had a few hit songs, the four solo songs which she sang in Parwana for music director Khwaja Khurshid Anwar made her a genuine singer-film star. It marked her final film with Saigal, who died a month before the film's release. Suraiya then appeared in Dak Bangla, Naatak, Do Dil and Do Naina. Her last film of the year was Dard, with Munawwar Sultana as the lead actress and Nusrat as the hero. She played Hamida, who falls in love with a doctor. Her film Dard became a surprise hit and along with Parwana, it was one of the year's biggest success.

=== Critical acclaim and superstardom (1948–1954) ===
Noor Jehan and Khursheed's departure to Pakistan, inadvertently added to Suraiya's success. Between 1948 and 1950, Suraiya earned both critical and commercial success. In 1948, she first played the lead opposite Motilal Rajvansh in Aaj Ki Raat. She next played the titular role in Kajal and appeared in Gajre. The year marked her first project opposite Dev Anand, who was relatively new. In Vidya, she played a wealthy woman who falls in love with a poor cobbler. While shooting for Vidya, she became romantically involved with him. When her film opposite Rehman, Pyar Ki Jeet was released, it caused large crowds outside Suraiya's house that was uncontrollable. Suraiya also acted in Shakti and Rang Mahal that year. Out of these seven films, Pyar Ki Jeet became the biggest hit. In her films with Anand, Suraiya was always the first biller in the credits, indicating her stardom. As per the book, The Women of Punjab, as a singing actress opposite Anand, her films achieved umpteen jubilees.

The year 1949 marked the peak of Suraiya's success with 11 film releases, a rare feat for an actress at that point of time. Naach, Lekh, Duniya and Char Din were mediocre films. She then played a married woman Shanta, whose husband loves a dancer in Singaar. Suraiya then reunited with Dev Anand in Jeet (as Jeet) and Shair (as Rani), playing his childhood sweetheart in both these films. Suraiya then played Kamla in Balam and Kanchan in Amar Kahani. In Dillagi, Suraiya played Mala, who is in love with Swaroop (played by Shyam), but is forced to marry someone else. Deepa Gahlot praised the film and added it in her book 50 Films that Deserve a New Audience. Her last film of the year was Badi Behen with Rehman, where she played a protective elder sister Shyama. During the premiere of Badi Behen, there was a very large crowd outside the cinema hall and the police had to baton-charge when Suraiya was walking into the hall. Suraiya stopped going to the premieres of her films, after the incident. Dillagi, Badi Behen and Singaar were the biggest commercial successes of the year.

In 1950, Suraiya's first few releases were Shaan, Khiladi and Kamal Ke Phool. She then acted opposite Dev Anand in Nili and Afsar. In Nili, she plays the titular role of an ordinary girl turned into a princess, while Afsar was the first film produced under Anand's production Navketan Films, with Suraiya playing Bimla. Her biggest success of the year was Dastan. Suraiya played an orphan Indira opposite Raj Kapoor. Bhaichand Patel stated that Suraiya's acting "over-shadowed" that of Kapoor. From the mid-to late 1940s to the early 1950s, Suraiya was the highest-paid and most popular star of the Indian cinema. From 1948 to 1949, she appeared in over 18 films, most of which turned out to be among the highest grossing releases of the year. From 1945 to 1954, she acted in twelve highest-grossing films.

During the years 1951–53, Suraiya's career saw a fluctuation with a series of commercial failures—in the films Shokhiyan, Rajput, Resham, Moti Mahal, Lal Kunwar, Khubsoorat, Goonj and Mashuqa. The last two films opposite Dev Anand Do Sitare and Sanam (as Sadhana Devi) were moderate hits. Sanam marked their last film together as post that, Suraiya and Anand never worked together. The only major commercial success in this period was Diwana opposite Suresh. She played a nomadic woman Laali who was married to a prince, but was separated by his father. The film became a success and celebrated a Silver Jubilee at the box office, becoming Suraiya's second film after Anmol Ghadi to do so.

Suraiya made a comeback in 1954. She played a tawaif Moti Begum in her career's most notable film, Mirza Ghalib, which won two awards at the 1954 National Film Awards. Suraiya shone both as an actress and as a singer for her rendition of Ghalib's lover, Chaudvin. Jawaharlal Nehru, commented on seeing the film, "Tumne Mirza Ghalib kii ruuh ko zindaa kar diyaa," ("You have brought the soul of Mirza Ghalib back to life"). While reviewing the film, Samira Sood of The Print called Suraiya the "soul" of the film and stated: "This movie belongs to Suraiya, whose voice communicates not only love, longing, hope and heartbreak, but the centuries-old magic of Ghalib." In her next release, Suraiya again played a courtesan, named Chintamani in Bilwamangal. Later, Suraiya played Shobha, whose husband dies in war in Waris and Sahebzadi Aalam, whose is in love with a poet in Shama Parwana, opposite Shammi Kapoor. Among these, Waaris turned out to be a moderate success.

=== Later work, setback and retirement (1955–1964) ===
In the mid-50s, Suraiya told Lata Mangeshkar once that she would soon be cutting down on her films. Lata told her not to do so. After 1954, Suraiya started to cut down on her work and appeared in films occasionally. Her two releases of 1955 were Kanchan (1955), which was released in 1949 as Amar Kahani and re-released as Kanchan, and Inam. In 1956, she played a protective sister Jyoti in Mr. Lambu, which was a box office hit. In 1958, Suraiya appeared in three films: Trolly Driver, with Rehman where she played Renu, Miss 1958 and Maalik. Post a two-year absence, Suraiya appeared as Roshan Ara in Shama in 1961.

The 1963 film Rustam Sohrab, with Prithviraj Kapoor was her last film. Suraiya played a princess Shehzadi Tahmina opposite Kapoor's Rustom Zabuli. Suraiya in an interview said that during the shooting of the film, she suffered from low blood pressure, which she cited as the reason for her retirement from acting. Her song "Ye kaisi ajab dastan ho gayi hai", from the film is considered among her best songs. Suraiya's final film association was in 1964, when she produced the film Shagoon. She produced the film under the name Suraiya Mubin. For her contribution to the Indian cinema, Suraiya received the Screen Lifetime Achievement Award in 1996 and Bimal Roy Memorial Lifetime Achievement Award in 1999.

=== Incomplete projects ===
Suraiya's film Jaanwar in the early 1950s with Dilip Kumar as the leading star (and K. Asif as director), was left incomplete by her, as she refused to act in the film, because of rough behaviour by Dilip Kumar during the shooting of the film, when he tore her blouse and bruised her back so badly that it took a month to heal. Later, director-producer K. Asif wanted a kissing scene. Suraiya knew that censors would not pass it. When she asked Asif how he would get it through the censors, he could not satisfy her and she withdrew from the film. There was another story also, that Dilip Kumar and K. Asif were hand in glove to exploit and humiliate Suraiya, because Suraiya had earlier ignored Dilip Kumar's plea to act with her. So they did some torrid scene and kept on repeating it for four days. Fed up with this ghastly behaviour of the two, Suraiya refused to act for them and withdrew from the film. In 1953, Suraiya refused the film Anarkali as heroine, a role which went to Bina Rai.

Two other of her films were left incompleted, one of which was Pagalkhana (also, in early 50s), with Bharat Bhushan as lead actor, which was abandoned by the producer director P.L. Santoshi after eight reels, because of financial constraints. The other was an English version of Wajid Ali Shah, starring Suraiya and Ashok Kumar in 1953, being filmed by British film director Herbert Marshall, was shelved after being made for some time. A number of her films were announced with advertisements in film magazines, but were partially made or did not take off. These were Palken with Shekhar, to be produced and directed by Devendra Goel, for Goel Cine Corporation; Gumrah by Globe Pictures, Bombay; Nigah by CB Films; Sanwri by Kundi Art Productions, produced and directed by Niranjan and Ching Chow to be produced by Nigaristan (producers of Moti Mahal). Later, it was revealed that Suraiya was K. Asif's first choice to play Anarkali in Mughal-e-Azam (1960).

== Music career ==
Suraiya is regarded as the first actor-singer of Independent India. In his book, Tilak Rishi noted: "Suraiya was people's choice as the most popular singing superstar". She made her singing debut as a child-singer was "Boot Karun Main Polish Babu" in the film Nai Duniya (1942), composed by Naushad. She went on to sing playback for actress Mehtab for Sharda (1942), Kanoon (1943) and Sanjog (1942–43) for Naushad and A.R. Kardar (director-producer), when her principal, Miss P.F. Puttack, took a strong view of her truancy from school, and her 'adventure' came to an abrupt halt. When Mehtab first saw baby Suraiya, she was hesitant to have her as her playback singer, but on hearing her, she wanted Suraiya to sing all her songs in her films. Even in later years, in 1946, Mehtab was so attached to Suraiya's singing, that she requested Suraiya to record disc versions of her songs in her film Shama (1946), produced by Sohrab Modi, when Suraiya had become a busy heroine and had left singing playback in films for Mehtab. Suraiya then sang for Mehtab, in her own disc versions which were recorded by Shamshad Begum in the film.

Suraiya debuted with Manna Dey in his first Hindi film song, and their only duet 'Jago ayee usha' in Tamanna in 1942, was directed by his uncle, the famous K. C. Dey. Again in 1942, Suraiya paired with Rajkumari in Station Master ( with music director Naushad) for the song 'Sajan ghar aye'. Suraiya acted in both these films. In 1943, Suraiya sang a song "Ek Tu Hoo, Ek Main Hoon", music composed by Naushad, in the film Kanoon, which was the first song in Bombay music industry, which had characteristics of Latin American music. The song "Bistar Bicha Liya Hai Tere Dar Ke Samne Ghar Hum Ne Le Liya hai Tere Ghar ke Samne", which Suraiya sang in duet with Arun Kumar for the film Hamari Baat (1943) was a major success.

A few years later, the singer-actor, K. L. Saigal was so impressed by the singing of the 16-year-old Suraiya, that he agreed to have her opposite him in the film Tadbir as a heroine and a singer in 1945. The music was directed by Lal Mohammad in the film. "Rani khol de dawar milne ka din aa gaya" is a memorable song from the film, she sang it with Saigal. Saigal again opted for Suraiya as his heroine and a singer in the films Omar Khayyam (1946) (with music director Lal Mohammad) and Parwana (1947) (with music director Khurshid Anwar). Parwana was Saigal's last film and was released after his death. Later, Suraiya continued to work with music director Naushad in a few films, and in 1946, she appeared with actress Noor Jehan in Anmol Ghadi as a co-star, with Naushad as the music director. She sang three songs in the film which became popular, of which 'Man leta hai angdai' went viral throughout the country. The musical film Dillagi (1949), under Kardar's direction, with Naushad's music, became a silver jubilee hit, with Suraiya becoming a national rage with her songs and acting. She sang about 51 songs for Naushad.

Suraiya's hits included songs like "Woh paas rahen ya door rahen", "Tere nainon ne chori kiya", "Tu mera chand, main teri chandni", "Man mor hua matwala", and "Nain diwane ik nahin mane". Khurshid Anwar was the music director in three films of Suraiya, viz. Ishara (1943), Parwana (1947) and Singaar (1949). Suraiya sang 13 songs in these films. With the music director duo, Husnlal Bhagatram, Suraiya sang in 10 films and recorded the most songs (58, excluding 6 repeat songs for the film Kanchan) for any music director from 1948 to 1958. The films were Pyar Ji Jeet (1948), Aaj Ki Raat (1948), Naach (1949), Balam (1949), Bari Behen(1949), Amar Kahani(1949), Sanam (1951), Shama Parwana (1954), Kanchan (1955) and Trolley Driver (1955). Her song "O, door janewale, wada na bhul jana" in Pyar Ki Jeet in 1948 became a hit all over India. Suraiya did only three films with music composer Sachin Dev Burman Vidya (1948), Afsar (1949) and Lal Kunwar (1952), as she was associated with other composers, and S.D. Burman came late into the scene in Bombay. Yet, most of their songs are memorable. "Man mor hua matwala" (in Afsar), "Nain Deewane", "Layi khushi ki dunia" (with Mukesh in 'Vidya') and "Preet sataye teri yaad na" in Lal Kunwar being some of them.

Ghulam Mohammad gave music for the National Award-winning film Mirza Ghalib (1954), in which she sang memorable songs of Mirza Ghalib. Kajal, Shair and Shama were other films for which he composed music for Suraiya. Other directors who composed music for her in her film songs, include C. Ramchandra in the film Dewana, Roshan in the film Masuka, K. Dutta (in the films, Rang Mahal and Yateem), Krishen Dayal (in the film, Lekh for songs, such as, "Dil ka qarar lut gaya" and "Badra ki chaon tale"), S. Mohinder (in Nili), Sardul Kwatra (in Goonj), Madan Mahan (in Khubsoorat), Roshan (in Mashuqa for songs, such as, "Mera bachpan wapas aya"), S.N.Tripahi (in Inaam), O.P. Nayyar (in Mr. Lamboo) and N. Dutta (in Miss 58). The music for her film, Main kya karoon (1945) was composed by Nino Mujamdar, for the film Shakti by Ram Prashad. Hansraj Behl composed music for the films Khiladi (songs, such as, "Chahat ka bhulana mushkil hai" and Dil nashad na ro"), Shaan (songs, such as, "Tarap ae dil"), "Rajput", "Moti Mehal" and "Resham". Her music director in the film Shokian (songs, such as, "Ratoon ki neend chheen li") was Jamal Sen and Bilo C. Rani directed music in the film Bilwamangal (songs, such as, "Parwano se preet sekh le"), Shyam Sunder gave music for her films, Char Din and Kamal ke Phool. Sajjad Husain was her music director in two films, viz. 1857 and Rustom Sohrab.

== Personal life ==
Suraiya was in a relationship with actor Dev Anand for four years from 1948 to 1951. Anand nicknamed Suraiya "Nosey", while to Suraiya, Dev Anand was "Steve", a name chosen from a book Dev Anand had given her. Suraiya also called Anand "Devina" and he called her "Suraiyana", while faking an Italian accent. Kamini Kaushal, who worked with Suraiya and Anand in Shair (1949), said in an interview to Filmfare in 2014, that Suraiya would pass on her letters to her to be delivered to Anand, when her grandmother started keeping an eye on their love-affair.

During the shooting of Jeet (1949), both Anand and Suraiya, had made plans for marriage and elopement, but at the last minute, an assistant director, jealous of their marriage, informed Suraiya's grandmother, who dragged her home from the scene. In the 'Star and Style' interview, Suraiya said that she gave in only when both her grandmother and her maternal uncle threatened to get Dev Anand killed. While shooting Afsar (1950), Dev Anand again proposed to her and gave her an engagement diamond ring worth rupees 3000. Suraiya's maternal grandmother, was fiercely opposed to Suraiya marrying Anand. She was supported by Suraiya's maternal uncle Zahoor and some film persons, viz. composer Naushad, director-producer A.R. Kardar, lyricist Naqshab and director M. Sadiq. Her grandmother had opposed the relationship, mainly because they were Muslims and Anand was a Hindu. The covert reason was that Suraiya was the only earning member of the family.

Suraiya and Anand were stopped from acting together after their last film in 1951 by her grandmother. Thereafter, Suraiya remained unmarried by her own choice for the rest of her life. In an interview with Stardust, in June 1972, Suraiya revealed that she lacked the courage to resist her family and that Anand truly loved her. Anand wanted her to be bold and marry him in a civil court, but she refused. Dev Anand went on to marry Kalpana Kartik two years later in 1954 in a hurried simple marriage. Suraiya remained unmarried all her life.

=== Friendships ===
While working as a child artist at All India Radio, Suraiya became friends with Raj Kapoor and Madan Mohan, who later became an actor and music director respectively. Suraiya shared a cordial relationship with many people from the industry and was friends with Paidi Jairaj, Nimmi, Nirupa Roy, Tabassum and lyricist Hasan Kamal. Suraiya established a close bond with composer Naushad, whom she considered her mentor. Naushad stated that post her departure from the industry, Suraiya limited her friends circle and met only few people occasionally.

== Later life and death ==
In 1963, Suraiya retired from acting career, supposedly due to two reasons. Her father Aziz Jamal Sheikh died that year, and because of her health problems. Suraiya lived with her mother Mumtaz Begum after her father's death. Her friends in the industry were Paidi Jairaj, Nimmi, Nirupa Roy and Tabassum, whom she met occasionally. In 1979, Suraiya gave an interview to Raju Bhartan for The Illustrated Weekly of India, gaining limelight. After her mother's death in 1987, Suraiya became lonely. She lived in Krishna Mahal, Marine Drive, since the early 1940s. Suraiya possessed several apartments in Worli, Mumbai and property in Lonavala, near Pune.

Suraiya was concerned about the increase of sexualized imagery and violence in films. Speaking at a 1994 Cine Society event, she decried the producers' evident idea that this was good entertainment, and the Censor Board's overly lax "see no evil, speak no evil" approach to the matter. She said this was "leading the new generation in a wrong direction".

In December 1998, Suraiya then over 68 years old, while in New Delhi to receive the Sahitya Academy Award during Mirza Ghalib's bi-centenary celebrations, talked in a low voice and declined to sing, saying she had left “mosiqui (music) years ago”. Tabassum, who worked with Suraiya said, "It's sad that she had shut her doors to the world in her last days. But she'd talk comfortably with me on the phone. I remember our last conversation. I asked her: "Aapa kaisi hain?" (Elder sister, how are you?") She replied in verse: "Kaisi guzar rahi hai sabhi poochte hai mujhse, kaise guzaarti hoon koi nahin poochta."( "Everybody asks me 'how are you', but nobody asks me how I spend my days and nights.") (As told to Farhana Farook in 2012).

Suraiya died at Mumbai's Harkishandas Hospital on 31 January 2004 aged 75, after being admitted there for a week previously suffering from various ailments, including hypoglycemia, ischaemia and insulinoma. Among her visitors were Sunil Dutt, Naushad and Pratap A. Rana. Actor Dharmendra, who was her ardent fan, attended her funeral. She was buried at Badakabarastan in Marine Lines, Mumbai. During the last six months of her life, Suraiya lived with her lawyer, Dhimant Thakkar and his family. After her death, Suraiya's property at Worli and her house at Marine Drive went into legal dispute, as she did not leave behind an explicit will. In 2006, Mumbai High Court granted her Pakistani cousin, Mehfooz Ahmed (maternal uncle M. Zahoor's son) the right to administer the estate. In 2008, Ahmed, who never met her for over 40 years before her death, got the right to the rented house at Krishna Mahal, valued at 7.5 crores rupees, as a tenant by the High Court judgement (according to Mumbai's old rent control laws) over her family lawyer. The cousin had no objection to the house being sold.

== Public image ==
Suraiya in the poster of the 1949 film Char Din.

Suraiya is regarded as one of the greatest and most accomplished actresses of Indian cinema. She is noted for her simple roles, sweet voice and beauty. One of the highest paid actress of the 1940s and 1950s, Suraiya appeared in Box Office India's "Top Actresses" list seven times, from 1944 to 1950, and topped the list for three years (1948–1950). Box Office India also named her as the "Best Actress" of the 1940–1949 period. In 2022, she topped Outlook India's "75 Best Bollywood Actresses" list. In 2013, Suraiya's film looks were voted as the "Best on-screen beauty", on the completion of 100 years of the Indian cinema. Suraiya set fashion trends, that are still relevant and her sarees are a major style statement of the 1940s and 1950s.

After Suraiya established her career as a leading lady, she subsequently used to charge ₹1 lakh to ₹2 lakh per film and had a collection of limousines, including a Buick and a Lincoln. Suraiya was the highest paid actress of her time and was the first Indian actress who was paid more than her male co-actors. In his book The Immortal Queen Suraiya, Ranjan Sain wrote about her work ethics, he said, "Suraiya's day began with recitations from the Holy Quran, some exercise and breakfast. Next were shoots at the studios where she was known to be very friendly and treated everyone with respect. She had no airs or demands and would make no fuss about anything, from her hair and makeup to costumes, camera angles, footage or dialogues. She faced the camera with confidence and accepted the outcome with grace." Commenting on Suraiya's stardom, Ismat Chughtai stated: "After her early work as a singer, Suraiya took a big leap and became a film star — one who sparkled so brightly that for a while, even Nargis paled before her.

In 1946, Suraiya's film Anmol Ghadi celebrated Silver Jubilee (25 weeks continuous run in one or more cinema halls) in Bombay and other cities of India. In 1951, the inaugural issue of the film news-weekly Screen featured Suraiya on its cover. In the early fifties, her singing made a significant mark in people's lives [in India and Pakistan], so much so that fruit sellers sold watermelons in her name, "Le lo babuji bade meethein hai, Suraiya ke khet ke hai." (These watermelons are as sweet as Suraiya's voice). Actor Dharmendra admitted to being a big fan of the actress. He remembers walking miles to see Suraiya's Dillagi 40 times. Singer Lata Mangeshkar confessed to look up to her and said, "Suraiyaji sang mostly her songs on screen, and not for others. In my opinion, she was a very refined actress, truly gifted. Her acting was subtle and sensitive." Actors Iftekhar, Rehman and director M. Sadiq admired Suraiya and had expressed their desire to marry the actress. Due to her perceived appeal, Suraiya became one of the brand ambassadors of beauty products by Lux.

On her films and roles, Suraiya stated: "Most of my roles were simple, but the audiences loved them. I was lucky to have got simple, melodious and easy to pick up songs to sing, and work with the best composers of the day like Naushad, Husnlal-Bhagatram and Anil Biswas." Post the release of her film Bari Behen (1949), Suraiya stopped attending film premieres. Suraiya said, "When I went for the premiere of the movie, there was such a big crowd outside! As I walked into the theatre, they pulled at my clothes. There was a lathi charge and people were injured. I stopped going for premieres thereafter." Suraiya was known to be the most popular actress in the early years of Independence and was known for her female characters that "stood shoulder-to-shoulder" with their male counterparts. T. J. S. George stated in The Life and Times of Nargis that, Suraiya ruled "unchallenged" post partition. In his book Bollywood's Top 20 Superstars of Indian Cinema, Niranjan Iyengar wrote about her and noted: "Suraiya had become a national rage post her success in 1948-1949. Her glamour was hailed by film scribes as comparable to actresses Rita Hayworth, Lana Turner and Ava Gardner".

== Reception and legacy ==
Suraiya was known as the first superstar singer-actress of Indian films. She was widely successful as an actress and singer and was called "Singing Star". Music director Naushad found Suraiya's voice as the voice of the girl next door. He said, "It was an unsophisticated and charming voice and very effortless." Journalist Rauf Ahmed added Suriya on his "Biggest stars in Hindi filmdom" list and noted, "A singing sensation of her time, Suraiya was the first female star. No one has been able to emulate her." A writer from Saregama noted, "A singer by nature, an actress by coincidence, and a legend by her own making; Suraiya was the last actor and singer in Hindi cinema back in the 1940s before the era of playback singers kicked in." Pran Nevile of The Hindu termed her an "unforgettable singing legend" and noted, "In her heyday, she turned a legend and the highest paid artiste of her time. During the mid-forties, she dominated the film world with her music." In The Immortal Queen Suraiya, Ranjan Sain stated: "Suraiya became a huge star, yet was very disciplined and handled her busy work schedule efficiently. With 11 releases in 1949 [something no other actress had achieved], she unleashed hysteria all over the country."

In November 1956, Suraiya was sent to the Soviet Union by the Government of India as part of a delegate consisting of Raj Kapoor, Nargis and Kamini Kaushal, where her films were screened. When Suraiya's film Mirza Ghalib was awarded the President's gold medal for the Best Feature Film of 1954 during the 2nd National Film Awards, the then Prime Minister of India, Jawaharlal Nehru, praised her acting and songs and said that, Suraiya brought Mirza Ghalib's soul to life (Tumne Mirza Ghalib ki rooh ko zindaa kar diyaa). Suraiya later stated that she thought his praise was "more worthy than an Oscar". In 1998, Suraiya was honoured for perpetuating Mirza Ghalib's memory by her acting and songs by the then prime minister of India, Atal Behari Vajpayee during the Mirza Ghalib bi-centenary celebrations in New Delhi. In 2003, Suraiya was honoured and awarded a memento by the Dadasaheb Phalke Academy and Screen World Publication at a special function organised on the 134th birth anniversary of Dadasaheb Phalke.

=== Screen image—acting and singing style ===
Suraiya is known among the finest actresses of Indian cinema. Alongside Noor Jehan, she was the biggest star in the country before Independence. She earned praises with her roles in the films: Anmol Ghadi, Vidya, Pyar Ki Jeet, Bari Behen, Dillagi, Dastaan and Mirza Ghalib. From 1948 to 1949, a trio of hits—Pyar Ki Jeet, Badi Behan and Dillagi—made Suraiya a star. In the post-independence era, the cinema initially was mainly female-oriented, with Suraiya being the front-runner. Her path-breaking roles include portrayal of a willful girl in Anmol Ghadi, a strong and protective sister in Bari Behen and Mr. Lambu, a wealthy women in love with a poor cobbler in Vidya, an orphan in Dastaan, a nomadic woman in Diwana, a courtesan in Mirza Ghalib and Bilwamangal, and a princess in Rustam Sohrab. She named her roles in the films - Parwana, Kajal and Mirza Ghalib as her favourites.

The author of Celebrities: A Comprehensive Biographical Thesaurus of Important Men and Women in India, credited Suraiya for saving several films, with her "fine portrayals and dulcet songs". Arushi Jain of The Indian Express said that she was the highest-paid actor, earning more than her male counterparts. She noted, "Indian audiences of a certain vintage will remember Suraiya as a mesmerising face, a soulful voice and a graceful performer during 1940-1950s." Asjad Nazir of Eastern Eye termed her "screen queen" and said, "The biggest music and film star in India created the kind of mania with fans not seen before, with unprecedented crowds gathering to catch a glimpse of her." Journalist Adi Katrak called her, the first artist of the film industry to enjoy "star value" and noted her 1940s stardom to be bigger than that of Nargis and Dilip Kumar. He also noted how Suraiya was a "freelance", not bounded by contracts of big productions.

Suraiya generally preferred "spunky roles" in contrast to her submissive, swooning peers. Her strong female characters were a significant feature of pre-independence Indian films. According to Kanana Jhingana, Suraiya acted as a link to connect "tradition and modernity" with her films, her work represented the inclusion of Muslim voices and bodies in the aural/visual composite of Hindi cinema. Dinesh Raheja of Rediff.com noted, "Save for her arresting, almond-shaped eyes, Suraiya was not a classic beauty; nor did she trained in classical music. But, what gave her an edge over contemporaries Kamini Kaushal and Nargis was her ability to sing her own songs. Suraiya's dastaan, ajeeb but fascinating, continues to thrive on lore, speculation and memories." A journalist of Outlook India called her a "singing superstar" and stated, "The only Hindi film actress to be felicitated by two Prime Ministers for the same role – with which she performed a salutary service to Indian literature. Suraiya, both on and off the screen, sent audiences swooning with her films."

Suraiya was equally known for her singing and was the only actor-singer in Hindi cinema before the start of playback singing era. Commenting on her singing style, Ashok Ranade opined: "Suraiya's voice is neither thin nor broad and its strength is clearly felt in pronunciation of individual words, projection of line-endings and the facility with which she moves in the given tonal framework. Suraiya's voice is adequate for a kind of singing which maintains a relationship of continuity with speech tone --- a fact often lost sight of". Manish Telikicherla Chary said that Suraiya dominated the 1940s and 1950s with her singing. Vijay Poolakkal in his book stated that Suraiya was Husnlal Bhagatram's first choice as female singer in the 40s. Param Arunachalam of DNA India wrote, "Suraiya was among the last of the actor-singers who transitioned gracefully from the live singing to playback singing era." A News18 India writer noted, "In a professional manner, Suraiya's performances were distinguished by elegance and grace, and she sang from the depths of passion and tenderness in her heart and soul."

== Accolades ==
Year	Award	Category	Work	Result	Ref.
1996	Screen Awards	Lifetime Achievement Award	Contribution to Indian cinema	Honoured	
1999	Bimal Roy Memorial Awards	Lifetime Achievement Award	Contribution to Indian cinema	Honoured	

== Honours and tributes ==
On her death, Dev Anand said "I felt sad on her death. I did not go to her funeral because I would have been reminded of the past. I cried from a distance." Anand later wrote about his days with Suraiya in his autobiography, "Romancing With Life" in 2007. Dilip Kumar added, "Suraiya was a caring girl, very affectionate, particularly with junior artistes... Suraiya will be sorely missed, even though she had been a recluse for decades."

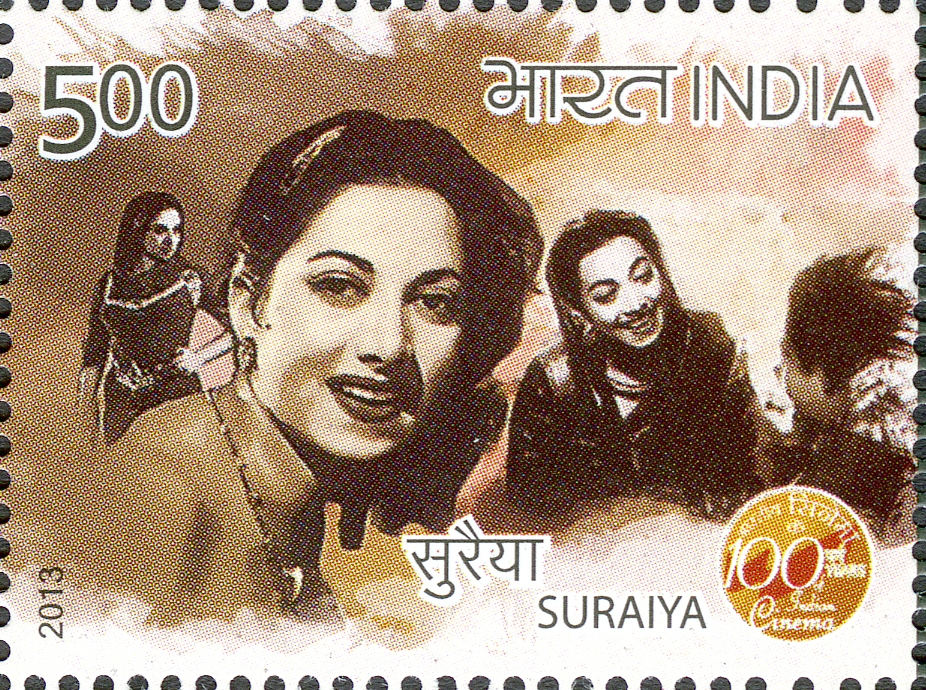
Suraiya on a 2013 stamp of India

In May 2013, a postage stamp, bearing her image in various roles, was released by the India Post of the Government of India to honour her on the occasion of the 100 years of Indian Cinema. Suraiya's songs, as a tribute to her, are played every year on her birth anniversary (15 June) and her death anniversary (31 January), by Radio Ceylon. In 2016, Bhaichand Patel wrote about Suraiya in his book "Bollywood's Top 20: Superstars of Indian Cinema". ShemarooMe gave tribute to Suraiya through the shows Naam Toh Suna Hoga and Screen Legends, in 2021 and 2022 respectively. In 2023, an exhibition at Kiran Nadar Museum of Art in Noida, named "Sitaare Zameen Par", had portraits of Suraiya that were captured by JH Thakkar. The same year, her souvenirs were auctioned online, along with that of other actresses. In 2024, Ranjan Sain published Suraiya's biography, "The Immortal Queen Suraiya".

"Suraiya Bano to me, was a bundle of unforgettable qualities. A sublime voice, the ring in the voice, the perfect diction, the effortless rendering. But she always insisted that she was no singer... There were congratulations all around (on her success in his film), but Suraiya insisted she was no great shakes as an actress. When she gave a sterling performance in Bari Behen, the success made Suraiya smile. She was right at the top and I was very happy for her."

— Director O. P. Dutta on Suraiya (after her death)

Giving tribute to Suraiya, The Tribune wrote, "The screen goddess and singing star, Suraiya Jamal Sheikh, had the world at her feet. Her career spanned a little over two decades but she left behind a vast repertoire of songs and films for audiences to delight in." Outlook wrote after her death, "She evoked the kind of hysteria [in the late 1940s] that can be compared only with Rajesh Khanna in his heyday from 1969 to 1972. Ask any old-timer and they would confirm that people bunked offices, schools and colleges, even shops closed on the opening day of her films, to see her films first day, first show." The Hindu wrote about Suraiya: "What can you say about a lady, who was courted by Dev Anand, respected by Pandit Jawaharlal Nehru, but feared by Lata Mangeshkar! That she was beautiful, talented, adored by millions, but died a lonely single woman? Or, that she was the best ever superstar singer-actress of Indian films, yet walked away to a self-imposed exile at the height of her glory? Yes, Suraiya was all this, plus 'a riddle, wrapped in a mystery, inside an enigma' who resolutely shunned screen and media once she departed from the arc lights."

== Popular culture references ==
=== In film ===
- National Film Archive of India, Pune added Suraiya's 1949 films—Badi Behen and Dillagi to its collection in 2017 and 2021 respectively.
- In 2018, actress Nancy Thakkar portrayed Suraiya in Nandita Das's Manto.
- In 2022, actress Paoli Dam dressed herself as Suraiya and recreated her look from Anmol Ghadi (1946), on the occasion of 75 years of Independence.

=== Biographies ===
- In 2024, Ranjan Sain wrote the first ever biography on Suraiya named, The Immortal Queen Suraiya.
- Suraiya has been an important character in biographies written on Dev Anand, namely: His autobiography Romancing with Life, and the biographies, The Dev Anand Story, and Dev Saab: A Journey with the legend Dev Anand.
