= Vidya (film) =

- Directed by: Girish Trivedi
- Written by: P. L. Santoshi (idea); Y. N. Joshi (dialogue); Munshi Ratanlal Khanjar (Screenplay)
- Starring: Dev Anand; Suraiya; Madan Puri
- Music by: S. D. Burman
- Production company: Jeet Productions
- Release date: 6 February 1948
- Country: India
- Language: Hindi

Vidya (transl. Knowledge) is 1948 Bollywood family drama film directed by Girish Trivedi, starring Dev Anand, Suraiya and Madan Puri. The film marked first of the many films where Suraiya and Anand were paired together.

== Plot ==
The film follows the story of Vidya, who belongs to a wealthy family and Chandu, who is a poor cobbler. The film traces their love.

== Cast ==
- Suraiya as Vidya
- Dev Anand as Chandrashekhar "Chandu"
- Madan Puri as Harilal "Harry"
- Ghulam Mohammad as Vidya's father
- Maya Banerjee as Leela
- Amirbai Karnataki as Vidya's mother
- Cuckoo as Dancer

== Production ==
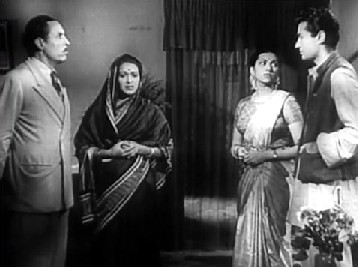
Suraiya and Dev Anand — on the sets of the film

During the shooting of the song "Kinare Kinare Chale Jayen Ge" in the film, a boat capsized and Dev Anand saved co-star Suraiya from drowning. After this incident Suraiya and Dev Anand fell in love and they began a long relationship. The film marked the start of over half a dozen appearances in films together.

== Legacy ==
The film was a moderate success. It was one of Suraiya's major success in her successful period of 1948-1949. While, it was one of Dev Anand's earliest success. The film further consolidated their careers.

== Music ==
All music was composed by Sachin Dev Burman and were a major hit.

1. "Jhoom Rahi Jhoom Rahi Khushiyo Ki Naav Aaj" - Suraiya
2. "Meri Muniya Ki Ankhiya Me Tu Aaja Nindiya" - Amirbai Karnataki
3. "Laai Kushi Ki Duniyaa Hansati Hui Jawaani" - Mukesh, Suraiya
4. "O Krishn Kanhaai Aashaaon Ki Duniyaa Men" - Suraiya
5. "Kise Maalum Thaa Do Din Men Saavan Bit Jaayegaa" - Suraiya
6. "Jivan Jyoti Bhujti Jaye" - Amirbai Karnataki
7. "Kinaare Kinaare Chale Jaayenge" - Suraiya
8. "Bhagawan Tere Sansaar Ke Hain Khel Niraale" - Amirbai Karnataki
9. "Pyar Ban Ke Mujh Pe Koi Cha Gaya" - Lalita Deulkar
10. "Bahen Na Kabhi Nain Se Neer Uthi Ho Chahe" - Mukesh
