= Bada Qabrastan Mumbai =

Muslim cemetery in Maharashtra, India

Coordinates: 18°56′54″N 72°49′23″E

Bada Kabarastan (also written Bara Qabristan and Badakabarastan; Urdu: بڑا قبرستان, lit. 'large graveyard'), is a Muslim cemetery in the Marine Lines area of south Mumbai in India. One of the largest Muslim cemeteries in the country, it is also the final resting place of a number of icons from various walks of life including Nargis, Madhubala, Suraiya, Haji Mastan, Karim Lala, Yakub Memon and Baba Siddique.

The land was purchased and dedicated to the Muslim Community by Konkani Muslim business man Nakhuda Mohammad Ali Roghay. The land comprises two parcels of land, one purchased from Mrs. Wombay, the widow of Balaji Shamsheth for the sum of RS. 26,620/00 on 8 August 1829 and another from the wife of Shapoorjee Sorabjee on 28 June 1832 for the sum of 32,251/00.

== Notable interments ==
- Mehboob Khan (1907–1964), film director
- Meeraji (1912–1949), Urdu poet
- Nargis (1929-1981), actress
- Suraiya (1929-2004), actress
- Madhubala (1933-1969), actress
- Shyama (1935–2017), actress
- Ismail Merchant (1936-2005), TV and Film Producer
- Baba Siddique (1958-2024), former Cabinet Minister (Maharashtra)
- Yakub Memon (1962-2015), Convicted terrorist
- Dilip Kumar
