= Screen Lifetime Achievement Award =

Annual film award in India

Screen Award for Lifetime Achievement
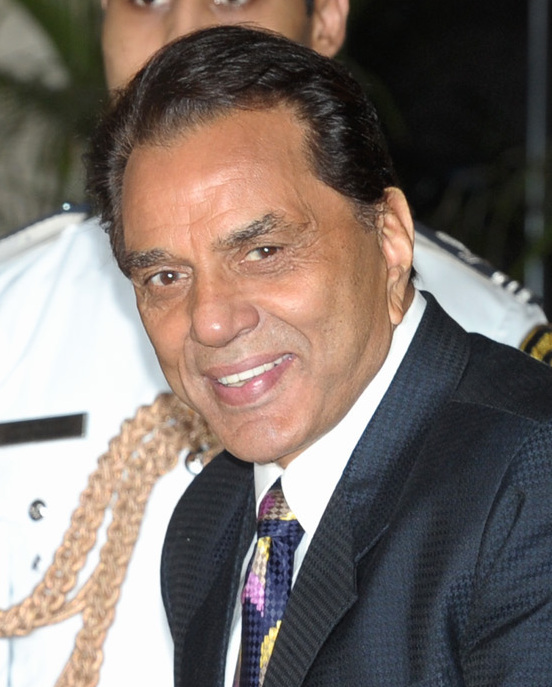
- The 2026 recipient: Dharmendra
- Awarded for: Commemorating an artist's career
- Country: India
- Presented by: Screen
- First award: Dev Anand & Lata Mangeshkar (1995)
- Currently held by: Dharmendra

The Star Screen Lifetime Achievement Award is an Indian cinema prize. Each year the recipient is chosen by a panel of judges, and the winner is announced in December or January.

== Winners ==
Year	Winner	Notes
2020	Prem Chopra
2019	Shabana Azmi
2018	Not Awarded
2017	Rekha
2016	Rishi Kapoor
2015	Hema Malini
2014	Amitabh Bachchan
2013	Yash Chopra
2012	Asha Bhosle
2011
2010	Javed Akhtar
2009	Sanjay Khan
2008	Manoj Kumar
2007	Mala Sinha & Biswajit
2006
2005	Jeetendra
2004	Not Awarded
2003	Rajesh Khanna
2002	Sharmila Tagore
2001	Pran
2000	Shammi Kapoor
1999	Pran
1998	Naushad Ali
1997	Sunil Dutt
1996	Suraiya
1995	Dev Anand & Lata Mangeshkar
1994	B.R. Chopra
1993	Ashok Kumar

== See also ==
- Screen Awards
