= Phool (1945 film) =

- Directed by: K. Asif
- Written by: Kamal Amrohi
- Produced by: K. Abdulla; Mian Ehsan-ul-Haq
- Starring: Prithviraj Kapoor; Veena; Yakub; Suraiya; Durga Khote; Sitara Devi
- Cinematography: Kumar Jaywant
- Edited by: Viththal Banker
- Music by: Ghulam Haider
- Release date: 1945
- Country: India
- Language: Hindi

Phool is a 1945 Indian Bollywood film. It was the fourth highest grossing Indian film of 1945. The film was directed by K. Asif who went on to make the blockbuster film Mughal-e-Azam.

== Cast ==
- Prithviraj Kapoor
- Veena
- Mazhar Khan
- Suraiya
- Durga Khote
- Yakub
- Dixit
- Agha
- Sitara Devi
- Wasti
- Jilloo
- Majid
- Ashraf Khan
