= Shair (film) =

1949 Indian Bollywood film

- Poster
- Directed by: M. S. Chawla
- Written by: M. S. Chawla
- Screenplay by: Kamil Rashid
- Produced by: Seth Jagat Narain
- Starring: Dev Anand; Suraiya; Kamini Kaushal
- Cinematography: S. Hardip
- Edited by: Dharamveer
- Music by: Ghulam Mohammed
- Distributed by: Jagat Pictures
- Release date: 1949
- Running time: 138 min
- Country: India
- Language: Hindi

Shair is a 1949 Indian Hindi-language film. The film had Dev Anand, opposite Suraiya and Kamini Kaushal in the eternal love triangle.

After Beena's mother dies her father Seth Jwalaprasad marries Gracie in vilayat (England?) and returns to India with Gracie and her daughter from a previous relationship/marriage Flora. This Anglo-Indian mother-daughter duo is shown to be opportunistic, manipulating Jwalaprasad for financial support, while mistreating Beena variously. Once Jwalaprasad dies and leaves only 1/4th of his possessions to the Anglo duo and the rest to Beena, the duo hatch a plan to get rid of Beena. The mother poisons her but blames it on Rani, a girl who is the third in the love triangle where Beena and Deepak are the other participants. While Rani, hurt by Deepak's refusal to believe her innocence, accepts the punishment at court, evidence comes up incriminating Gracie. The film ends with a suggested union between Deepak and Rani; and that between Prakash and Flora who now takes on the Indianized name Mohini, supposedly embarking on a moral life.

== Cast ==
- Dev Anand as Deepak
- Suraiya as Rani
- Kamini Kaushal as Beena
- Agha as Prakash / Parker
- Sulochana (Sr) as Beena's mother
- Shama Dulari
- Murad as Beena's Father Seth Jwalaprasad
- Kamlakant as Rani's Father
- Rekha
- Zia as dancer
- Cuckoo as Flora/Mohini
- Other characters: Beena's stepmother Gracie and step-sister (also lover of Parker) Flora

== Songs ==
This film's musical score is composed by Ghulam Mohammed, film song lyrics by Shakeel Badayuni.

| Song | Singer |
|---|---|
| "Aaj Koi Hai Aanewala" | Suraiya |
| "Dil Ki Duniya Ujad Gayi" | Suraiya |
| "Duniya Ke Sitam Ka Koi" | Suraiya |
| "Hamen Tum Bhul Baithe Ho, Hum Tum Ko Yaad Kartein Hain" | Suraiya |
| "Kya Cheez Hai Mohabbat" | Suraiya |
| "Tere Khayal Ko Dil Se" | Lata Mangeshkar |
| "Tu Door Hai Aankhon Se" | Lata Mangeshkar |
| "Do Bichhde Hue Dil, Aapas Me Gaye Mil" | Lata Mangeshkar, G. M. Durrani |
| "Yeh Duniya Hai Yaha Dil Ka Lagana Kisko Aata Hai" | Lata Mangeshkar, Mukesh |
| "O More Balma Kaahe Mari Katar Hay Daiya" | Shamshad Begum, Mohammed Rafi |
