= Dil Diya Dard Liya =

- Film poster
- Directed by: Abdur Rashid Kardar; Dilip Kumar
- Written by: Kaushal Bharati
- Based on: Wuthering Heights by Emily Brontë
- Starring: Dilip Kumar; Waheeda Rehman; Rehman; Pran; Johnny Walker
- Cinematography: Dwarka Divecha
- Edited by: M.S. Haji
- Music by: Naushad
- Release date: 1966
- Running time: 169 minutes
- Country: India
- Language: Hindi

Dil Diya Dard Liya is a 1966 Hindi romance film based upon Emily Brontë's 1847 novel Wuthering Heights. The film is directed by Abdur Rashid Kardar and Dilip Kumar. The film stars Dilip Kumar, Waheeda Rehman, Rehman, Pran, and Johnny Walker. The music is by Naushad. The songs include "Koi Sagar Dil Ko Behlata Nahin", "Phir Teri Kahani Yaad Aayi", "Guzre Hain Aaj Ishq Mein", "Dilruba Maine Tere Pyar Mein". It inspired the 1983 Pakistani film Dehleez starring Nadeem, Shabnam, Afzal Ahmed and Agha Taalish and the 1985 Hindi movie Oonche Log. The film was Dilip Kumar's first outright flop in 15 years at the box-office.

== Plot ==
The film begins with a sea storm that sinks a ship leaving a child as the sole survivor. In another scene a king is shown waiting for his grandchild. He dies still waiting but bequeaths his property to his grandchild, Shankar. Thakur, a kindhearted, widowed landlord, lives a wealthy lifestyle with his son Ramesh, daughter Roopa and an adopted child, Shankar. Ramesh hates Shankar and openly mistreats him.

Years pass by and Thakur dies. A grown-up Ramesh (Pran) frequents a beautiful courtesan, drinks alcohol, and continues to abuse and mercilessly beat Shankar (Dilip Kumar), who bears this in silence. Meanwhile, over the years, Shankar and Roopa (Waheeda Rehman) have fallen in love with each other. When Ramesh finds out, he has Shankar severely beaten and thrown off a cliff. Ramesh then arranges Roopa's marriage to a wealthy man, Satish (Rehman), while he continues to romance the courtesan Tara Bai (Rani) and signs over his entire estate and home to her.

A few years later, Shankar returns as the wealthy king of Belapur. He is fully prepared to compromise with Ramesh and propose to Roopa. He finds out that nothing has changed, however. Ramesh, though rendered penniless by Tara, still hates Shankar. Satish is engaged to Roopa and a marriage date has been fixed. Shankar's love is now replaced by vengeance and hate, and all he can think of is destroying the lives of Ramesh, Roopa, Satish and his sister, Mala (Shyama), and he devises several plans to destroy their lives.

== Cast ==
- Dilip Kumar as Shankar / Raja Sahab (Heathcliff)
- Waheeda Rehman as Roopa (Catherine Earnshaw)
- Pran as Thakur Ramesh (Hindley Earnshaw)
- Rehman as Satish (Edgar Linton)
- Johnny Walker as Murlidhar
- Shyama as Mala (Isabella Linton)
- Rani as Tarabai
- Dulari as Basanti
- D. K. Sapru as Ramesh's Father
- Murad as Maharaja of Belapur
- Tun Tun as. Mrs. Murlidhar

== Music ==
Dil Diya Dard Liya

Soundtrack album by Naushad
- Released: 1966
- Genre: Feature film soundtrack
- Label: Saregama

Naushad chronology
| Leader (1964) | Dil Diya Dard Liya (1966) | 'Saaz Aur Awaaz' (1966) |

The soundtrack for the movie was composed by Naushad and lyrics penned by Shakeel Badayuni. The soundtrack consists of 8 songs, featuring vocals by Mohammed Rafi, Asha Bhosle and Lata Mangeshkar.

=== Track listing ===
| Song | Singer | Raag |
|---|---|---|
| "Dil Diya Dard Liya" | Mohammed Rafi | Yaman Kalyan |
| "Guzre Hain Aaj Ishq Mein" | Mohammed Rafi | Darbari Kanada |
| "Koi Sagar Dil Ko Behlata Nahin" | Mohammed Rafi | Kalavati |
| "Sawan Aaye Ya Na Aaye, Jiya Jab Jhume, Sawan Hai" | Mohammed Rafi, Asha Bhosle | Brindavani Sarang |
| "Rasiya Tu Bada Bedardi" | Asha Bhosle | Pilu |
| "Dil Haarnewale Aur Bhi Hai" | Asha Bhosle | |
| "Phir Teri Kahani Yaad Aayi" | Lata Mangeshkar | Jhinjhoti |
| "Kya Rang-E-Mehfil Hai" | Lata Mangeshkar | |

== Awards and nominations ==
14th Filmfare Awards (1967)

Nominated

- Best Actor - Dilip Kumar
- Best Supporting Actor - Pran

== Reception ==
Dil Diya Dard Liya did not fare as well as other movies of Dilip Kumar, nor was it well received by critics. Although the film is sometimes considered by a few researchers to be a failed adaptation of Emily Brontë's 1847 novel Wuthering Heights. “It could please neither the critical eyes nor the Box Office. It was a flop in both ways…. in the process of adapting a literary work, without breaking the barrier of the typical Bollywood form of representation, it fails both to adapt the essence of the novel and to strictly hold on to the form.”
