= Naatak =

- Release date: 1947
- Country: India
- Language: Hindi

Naatak is a Bollywood film. It was released in 1947. It has been released for free on YouTube. This film is known to be one of the earliest Indian film to be partly couloured.

== Music ==
1. "Dil Wale Jal Jal Kar Hi Mar Jaana" – Uma Devi
2. "Dil Leke Chale To Nahi Jaaoge" – Suraiya
3. "Na Ho Koi Jaha Chale Hum Tum Waha" – Amar, Suraiya
4. "Apna Jinhe Banaya Thukra Ke Wo Sidhare" – Suraiya
5. "Bhul Ja Ae Dil Wo" – Amar
6. "Jab Se Chale Gaye Hai Wo" – Suraiya
7. "Kale Kale Aaye Badarva" – Suraiya
8. "Kya Bataye Kitni Hasrat Dil Ke Virane Me Hai" – Zohrabai Ambalewali
9. "Man Ka Panchhi Shor Machaaye" – Amar
10. "Taro Bhari Raat Sajan" – Suraiya
