= Dwarka Divecha =

Indian actor and cinematographer

Dwarka Divecha (Dwarkadas Divecha, March 19, 1918 – January 5, 1978) was an Indian actor and cinematographer.

== Early life ==
Divecha was born in Mumbai, India.

== Career ==
Divecha worked as a cameraman and cinematographer on about 30 movies. In 1955 he won a Filmfare Best Photographer in Black and White award for his work on the film Yasmin.

In 1960 he acted in the film Singapore.

His best known film is Sholay, in which he was also involved in creating the sets and special effects. The film has since been re-released in 3D. The film was a box office hit, and critics agreed that the quality of the photography contributed to its success.

Divecha died on January 5, 1978.

== Major camerawork and cinematography ==
- 1943 Sanjog
- 1944 Ratan
- 1948 Nai Reet
- 1949 Dillagi (as Dwarkadas Divecha)
- 1949 Paras
- 1949 Jeet (as Dwarkadas Divecha, photography)
- 1950 Dastan
- 1953 Jeewan Jyoti (Director of photography)
- 1953 Dil-E-Nadaan
- 1955 Baap Re Baap
- 1955 Yasmin
- 1958 Do Phool (Photography)
- 1958 Solva Saal (Director of photography)
- 1959 Chhoti Bahen
- 1961 Sasural
- 1962 China Town
- 1962 Professor
- 1963 Hamrahi (Photography)
- 1964 Beti Bete (as Dwaraka Divecha)
- 1966 Daadi Maa
- 1966 Dil Diya Dard Liya (director of photography)
- 1966 Amrapali
- 1968 Jhuk Gaya Aasman
- 1969 Jeene Ki Raah
- 1969 Prince (Photography)
- 1970 Khilona (Director of photography - as Dwaraka Divecha)
- 1971 Lal Patthar (Photography)
- 1974 Manoranjan (Director of photography)
- 1975 Sholay (Director of photography)
- 1976 Udhar Ka Sindur (Director of photography)
- 1978 Trishna (Director of photography - as late Dwarka Divecha)
