= Daughters of Today (1928 film) =

1928 film

- Directed by: Shankradev Arya
- Produced by: G. K. Mehta
- Starring: A. R. Kardar; Wilayat Begum; M. Ismael; Vijay Kumar; Hiralal; Ghulam Qadir; G. K. Mehta
- Production company: Premier Film Company
- Release date: 1928
- Country: India
- Language: Silent Film

Daughters of Today was a 1928 silent film from Lahore, in present-day Pakistan (then British India). It was produced by G.K Mehta and directed by Shankradev Arya.

This was the first feature film made in Lahore, and helped to establish the city of Lahore as one of the centers of filming in India as Lollywood. Production started in 1924 and took three years to complete, mainly due to financial problems.

Two participants later became prominent personalities of the South Asian film industry: A.R. Kardar was one of the most famous Bombay film directors in the 1930s, 1940s and 1950s; and actor M. Ismael's film career spanned over five decades.

== Cast ==
- A.R. Kardar
- Hiralal
- Walait Begum
- M. Ismail
- Vijay Kumar
- G.K. Mehta
- Ghulam Qadir
