= Nili (film) =

- Directed by: Ratibhai Punatar
- Produced by: Ranjit Studios
- Starring: Suraiya; Dev Anand
- Music by: S. Mohinder
- Release date: 1950
- Country: India
- Language: Hindi

Nili is a 1950 Indian Hindi-language film directed by Ratibhai Punatar, and produced under the banner of Ranjit Studios. The film's cast includes Suraiya, Dev Anand, Agha, Shama Dulari, P. Kailas and Cuckoo. Its music was composed by S. Mohinder.

The film was reviewed by The Times of India on 16 August 1950. A contemporary report in The Bombay Chronicle mentioned that Nili had a theatrical run of over 11 weeks in Bombay and was popular with audiences.

According to film critic Anuj Kumar, Nili was financially unsuccessful but its soundtrack was popular and proved to be a breakthrough for Mohinder.
