= Shokhiyan =

- Directed by: Kidar Sharma
- Starring: Suraiya; Prem Nath; Jeevan
- Music by: Jamal Sen
- Release date: 1951
- Country: India
- Language: Hindi
- Budget: ₹15 lakh

Shokhiyan is a 1951 Indian Hindi-language film directed by Kidar Sharma. The film starred Suraiya, Prem Nath, and Jeevan. It marked the debut of Jamal Sen as a music director.

In his 2002 autobiography, Kidar Sharma recalled the film as the most expensive black-and-white feature of his career, with a budget estimated at ₹15 lakh".
