= Shama Parwana =

- Directed by: D. D. Kashyap
- Starring: Shammi Kapoor; Suraiya
- Music by: Husnlal Bhagatram
- Release date: 1954
- Country: India
- Language: Hindi

Shama Parwana is a 1954 Indian Hindi-language film directed by D. D. Kashyap. The film stars Shammi Kapoor and Suraiya, and features a soundtrack composed by Husnlal Bhagatram.

Released during the period of decline in Suraiya's popularity, the film received positive reviews from critics, with The Times of India noting the "fine portrayals" and "beautiful music". According to Suraiya's 1962 Star Portrait profile, the success of Shama Parwana as well as Mirza Ghalib (1954) earned "fresh laurels" for the actress.
