= Shama (1961 film) =

- Directed by: Lekhraj Bhakri
- Starring: Suraiya; Nimmi; Vijay Dutt
- Music by: Ghulam Mohammed
- Release date: 1961
- Country: India
- Language: Hindi

Shama is a 1961 Indian Hindi-language film directed by Lekhraj Bhakri. It stars Suraiya, Nimmi, and Vijay Dutt. The film's soundtrack, composed by Ghulam Mohammed, features the popular Suraiya song "Dhadkate Dil Ki Tamanna". The song is set in raga Pilu. While musically successful, the film "sank without a trace" according to author Ganesh Anantharaman.

A Times of India review published on 20 August 1961 described the film as a "dull" and "dreary affair".

== Cast ==
- Suraiya
- Nimmi
- Vijay Dutt
- Kumar
- Kammo
- Tarun Bose
- Mumtaz Begum
- Tun Tun
- Kumud Tripathi
- Leela Mishra
- Renu Maker
