= Aaj Ki Raat (film) =

1948 film by D.D. Kashyap

- Directed by: D.D. Kashyap
- Release date: 1948
- Country: India

Aaj Ki Raat is a 1948 Bollywood production. It starred Suraiya and Motilal Rajvansh and was directed by D.D. Kashyap. The other actors included Yakub, Shah Nawaz, Leela Mishra, Anita Sharma, Raj Mehra and Sangeeta. The music was given by Husnlal-Bhagatram and lyricist for the movie was Rajendra Krishan.

== Cast ==
- Suraiya
- Motilal Rajvansh
- Yakub
- Shah Nawaz
- Leela Mishra
- Anita Sharma
- Raj Mehra
- Sangeeta
