= Khilari (1950 film) =

- Directed by: R. C. Talwar
- Written by: J. S. Kashyap (dialogues)
- Produced by: R. C. Talwar
- Starring: Ashok Kumar; Suraiya
- Music by: Hansraj Behl
- Distributed by: Bombay Talkies
- Release date: 1950
- Country: India
- Language: Hindi

Khilari (transl. Player) is a 1950 Indian Hindi-language film directed and produced by R. C. Talwar. It marked the first & the only released onscreen collaboration of actors Ashok Kumar and Suraiya, two major stars of 1940s Hindi cinema. The film also marked the acting debut of Kumar's brother Anoop Kumar who played a supporting role. The film features a soundtrack composed by Hansraj Behl.

In a contemporary Times of India review, Khilari was described as a "pleasing" and "well directed picture".

== Cast ==
- Ashok Kumar
- Suraiya
- Kumar
- Sunder
- Indu
- E. Tarapore
- Anoop Kumar
- Narmada Shanker
- Cuckoo Moray
- Vasantrao

== Soundtrack ==
While Hansraj Behl provided the music direction, the lyrics were penned by Deena Nath Madhok, Nakhshab Jarchavi & Rajendra Krishan. Shamshad Begum, Suraiya, Mohammed Rafi, Kishore Kumar, Lata Mangeshkar & Sundar provided their vocals to the soundtrack.

Song	Singer(s)	Lyricist
"Yeh Teekhe Teekhe Nainonwale..."		Deena Nath Madhok
"Jee Bhar Ke Mohabbat Kar Le..."	Shamshad Begum	Deena Nath Madhok
"Yeh Kaali Zulfon Wale Jeene Nahin Dete..."	Sundar	Deena Nath Madhok
"Mast Hawaon Mein Thandi Thandi Chhaon Mein..."	Suraiya	Deena Nath Madhok
"Chahat Ka Bhulana Mushkil Hai..."	Suraiya	Nakhshab Jarchavi
"Dil-e-Nashaad Na Ro..."	Suraiya	Nakhshab Jarchavi
"Main Raat Ko Uth Uth Roti Hoon..."	Suraiya	Nakhshab Jarchavi
"Mohabbat Mein Nazar Milte HI..."	Suraiya	Nakhshab Jarchavi
"Dard-e-Dil Tham Jaa Zara..."	Lata Mangeshkar	Nakhshab Jarchavi
"Ada Se Muskuraaey Jaa..."	Kishore Kumar	Rajendra Krishan
"Yeh Pyaar Ki Manzil Se Mujhe..."	Mohammed Rafi & Suraiya	Rajendra Krishan
