= Do Sitare =

- Directed by: D. D. Kashyap
- Starring: Suraiya; Dev Anand
- Music by: Anil Biswas
- Release date: 1951
- Country: India
- Language: Hindi

Do Sitare is a 1951 Indian Hindi-language film directed by D. D. Kashyap. The film was one of the several collaborations of actors Suraiya and Dev Anand, who were in a highly publicized offscreen relationship at the time. Other members of the cast included Prem Nath. Anil Biswas composed the music for Do Sitare.

The film was released in Bombay on 9 November 1951 and was subsequently reviewed in The Times of India. Do Sitare was a box office flop and contributed to Suraiya's declining stardom in the early 1950s.
