= Mr. Lambu =

- Starring: Sheikh Mukhtar; Suraiya
- Music by: O. P. Nayyar
- Release date: 1956
- Country: India
- Language: Hindi

Mr. Lambu is a 1956 Indian Hindi-language Bollywood movie. The plot revolves around the once popular genre of Rakhi relations, a bond between brother and sister. It stars Suraiya, one of the most popular actresses and singers of the Indian subcontinent of her generation. In the film, Asha Bhosle, one of the most respected playback singers in India, sings three solo songs composed by the award-winning director of cinematic music, Indian composer O. P. Nayyar.

== Plot ==
Lambu is a petty criminal whose sympathy for the downtrodden and oppressed frequently leads to his taking the law into his own hands, and his going to jail. His sister Jyoti is an intelligent student who helps her mother and family at home. Jyoti falls in love with a fellow student named Prem, who is handsome and owns a car, but negotiations between the families is made difficult because of Lambu's criminality.

When Prem's family agree to the marriage, Lambu wants his sister Jyoti to have a big wedding, and he concocts a scheme to rob the house of a wealthy man named Seth. Lambu's friend Mahipat Rai (alias Pat Pat) warns him against committing such a crime.

On the night of the planned robbery, the horrendous criminal Chhaganial gets to the house first, where he steals valuable documents and kills Seth. When he arrives and discovers that Seth has been killed, Lambu runs off but shortly afterwards wins the lottery and becomes known as Mr. Lambu. Chhaganial wanted Lambu's lottery wealth, as well as his sister Jyoti, and lays a trap for him using his accomplice the dancer Veera.

The crime unravels when Veera forgets her mission and surrenders to Lambu, but before she can expose the whole crime, Chhaganial kills her, causing Prem to be blamed. Though Jyoti knows that Prem did not kill Veera, she cannot say anything because she has to protect her brother Lambu, something that is expected of siblings in India, as sisters and brothers never betray one another.

== Cast ==
- Sheikh Mukhtar
- Suraiya
- Helen
- Minoo Mumtaz
- Kamaljeet

== Music ==
Song	Singer
"Jo Hum Tum Mil Gaye"	Geeta Dutt
"Aa Mere Dildaar, Kar Le Humse Naina Chaar"	Geeta Dutt, Mohammed Rafi
"Tu Zara Si Baat Par Khafa Na Ho"	Mohammed Rafi, Suraiya
"Yaad Karoon Tohri Batiya"	Suraiya
"Soyi Hai Kahan Jakar"	Suraiya
"Kahan Jate Ho"	Asha Bhosle
"Kaise Kaise Teer Chalaye"	Asha Bhosle
"Kitne Sitam Kitne Hi Gham"	Asha Bhosle

== Reception ==
The film was an office box success and was a hit. The film managed to do well despite Suraiya’s decline in her career at the time due to her poor health issues.
