= Bilwamangal (1954 film) =

- Directed by: D. N. Madhok
- Starring: C. H. Atma; Suraiya
- Music by: Bulo C Rani
- Release date: 1954
- Country: India
- Language: Hindi

Bilwamangal is a 1954 Indian Hindi-language film directed by D. N. Madhok. The film's music was composed by Bulo C Rani. The titular role of Surdas was played by Sindhi singer C. H. Atma, while Suraiya starred as his courtesan lover, Chintamani. Other members of the cast included Nirupa Roy, Ulhas, and Asha Mathur.

Among contemporary reviewers, Baburao Patel regarded Bilwamangal as an "insipid rehash" of the 1942 film Bhakta Surdas, and was critical of the film's direction, music, and performances.

== Cast ==
- C. H. Atma as Bilwamangal / Surdas
- Suraiya as Chintamani
- Nirupa Roy
- Ulhas
- Asha Mathur
