= Ghulam Mohammed (composer) =

Film music composer (1903–1968)

- Born: 1903; Bikaner, Rajputana Agency, British India
- Died: 17 March 1968 (aged 64–65); Mumbai, Maharashtra, India
- Occupations: film music composer, tabla player
- Years active: 1931 - 1963
- Awards: 1955: National Film Award for Best Music Direction: Mirza Ghalib (1954)

Ghulam Mohammed (1903 – 17 March 1968) was an Indian film score composer, who is notable for Hindi musical films such as Shair (1949), Pardes (1950), Mirza Ghalib (1954), Shama (1961) and Pakeezah (1972).

He received National Film Award for Best Music Direction (then called State Awards for Films) for Mirza Ghalib (1954). The shooting of his last film, Pakeezah, was held up for many years due to marital and personal problems between the film producer Kamal Amrohi and the lead actress Meena Kumari, and was finally released only after Ghulam Mohammed's death.

== Early life and career ==
Ghulam Mohammed was born in Bikaner, Rajasthan, into a family of musicians. His father, Nabi Baksh, was an accomplished tabla player.

He started his career as a child actor at age six with the Punjab-based New Albert Theatrical Company and worked at the local Albert Theatre in Bikaner. He eventually signed on as a contract artiste for 25 rupees a month, but before he could take up the appointment, the theatre closed due to financial difficulties.

In 1924, he came to Bombay, where after a struggle of eight years, in 1932 he got the chance of playing the tabla in Saroj Movietone's Productions' "Raja Bharthari".

In music composition, he first became an assistant, to music director, Naushad in Kardar Productions, and worked with him and the veteran film composer Anil Biswas, for over 12 years, before composing independently, in the film 'Tiger Queen' (1947). He continued working independently and composed for several more films, and eventually won the 1955 National Film Award for Best Music Direction for his Mirza Ghalib (1954).

He died on March 17, 1968, years before Pakeezah (1972) was released. In fact, his mentor and close friend veteran film composer Naushad stepped in, after his death, to finish the film composing work in film Pakeezah. "The music by the late Ghulam Mohammed was also a benchmark score. Arriving bang in the midst of the peak era of R. D. Burman and Kishore Kumar, it brought back classic melody of the timeless kind and won a Gold Disc from Saregama, which was then called His Master's Voice, for outstanding sales." He was also nominated for Best Music Director for film Pakeezah (1972) at the Filmfare Awards. "In 1972, Pran refused to accept his Filmfare award for the Best Supporting Actor in Be-Imaan because he felt music composer Ghulam Mohammed deserved a Filmfare award for his songs in Pakeezah." Many consider his score to be one of the greatest in Indian Cinema.

In 1997, he was honoured, in the 'Keep Alive' music show series in Mumbai, that honours all-time film music composers of India.

An extensive audio - visual programme on Ghulam Mohammed was presented by Mumbai- based music troupe MUSICOLOR in 2010 where music lovers cherished the composer's composed film songs.

"One commonly-heard story is that when Shankar–Jaikishan were composing their maiden venture Barsaat (1949), they insisted on having Ghulam Mohammed play the dholak for the film song 'Barsaat Mein Ham Se Mile Tum Sajjan'".

== Filmography ==
- Baanke Sipahi (1937)
- Sanjog as a music Asstist with Naushad
- Mera Khwab (1943)
- Doli (1947)
- Tiger Queen (1947)
- Elaan as a music Assistant with Naushad
- Grihasthi (1948)
- Kaajal (1948)
- Pagdi (1948)
- Parayee Aag (1948)
- Dil Ki Basti (1949)
- Paras (1949)
- Shair (1949)
- Hanste Aansoo (1950)
- Maang (1950)
- Pardes (1950)
- Bikhre Moti (1951)
- Naazneen (1951)
- Ajeeb Ladki (1952)
- Amber (1952)
- Sheesha (1952)
- Dil-E-Nadaan (1953)
- Gauhar (1953)
- Hazaar Raaten (1953)
- Laila Majnu (1953)
- Rail Ka Dibba (1953)
- Guzaara (1954)
- Mirza Ghalib (1954)
- Hoor-e-Arab (1955)
- Kundan (1955)
- Sitara (1955)
- Pak Daaman (1957)
- Maalik (1958)
- Do Gunde (1959)
- Shama (1961)
- Pakeezah (1972)

== Awards and recognition ==
- 1955: National Film Award for Best Music Direction: Mirza Ghalib (1954)
- His Master's Voice Gold Disc Award in 1972
