= Dastan (1950 film) =

1950 film

- Directed by: A. R. Kardar
- Written by: S. N. Banerjee
- Produced by: A. R. Kardar
- Starring: Raj Kapoor; Suraiya
- Cinematography: Dwarka Divecha
- Edited by: Iqbal; G. G. Mayekar
- Music by: Naushad
- Release date: 1950
- Running time: 122 minutes
- Country: India
- Language: Hindi

Dastan a 1950 Bollywood drama film produced and directed by A. R. Kardar.

A box office success, the film became the third highest earning film of 1950. It stars Raj Kapoor, Suraiya, Veena, Suresh, Al Nasir, Murad and Shakila.

The story, a tragic melodrama, was a narrative in flashback. It was inspired by the film Enchantment (1948), directed by Irving Reis. Cited as "one of the biggest commercial hits" by Patel, Suraiya's acting was stated to have "over-shadowed" that of Raj Kapoor. However, Dastan was Suraiya's last major success as an actress, following which her popularity waned and she was replaced by Madhubala as the top female star.

== Cast ==
- Raj Kapoor as Raj
- Suraiya as Indira
- Veena as Rani
- Suresh as Ramesh
- Al Nasir as Kundan
- Protima Devi as Ramesh's Mother
- Murad as Father
- Banerji as Shambhu Dada
- Lakshman
- Surinder
- Shakila as young Rani
- Baby Anwari
- Krishna Kumar

== Soundtrack ==
The music was composed by Naushad and the lyricist was Shakeel Badayuni. The singers were Suraiya and Mohammed Rafi. Some of the notable numbers from this film included Suraiya's "Yeh Sawan Rut Tum Aur Hum", "Yeh Mausam Aur Yeh Tanhai", "Ae Sham Tu Bata" and "Naam Tera Hai Zuban Par".

=== Song list ===
Song	Singer
"Yeh Sawan Rut, Tum Aur Hum, Dil Nache Re Chham Chham Chham"	Mohammed Rafi, Suraiya
"Dil Ko Teri Tasveer Se Behlaye Huye Hain, Behlaye Huye Hain"	Mohammed Rafi, Suraiya
"Dhadak Dhadak Dil Dhadke, Phadak Phadak Naina Phadke"	Mohammed Rafi, Suraiya
"Mohabbat Badhaakar Juda Ho Gaye"	Suraiya
"Yeh Mausam Aur Yeh Tanhai"	Suraiya
"Naam Tera Hai Zuban Par"	Suraiya
"Nainon Mein Preet Hai"	Suraiya
"Aaya Mere Dil Mein Tu"	Suraiya
"Ae Shama Tu Bata"	Suraiya
