= Anmol Ghadi =

1946 film

- Directed by: Mehboob Khan
- Written by: Anwar Batalvi (story); Agha Jani Kashmiri (writer)
- Starring: Surendra; Noor Jehan; Suraiya; Zahur Raja
- Cinematography: Faredoon A. Irani
- Music by: Naushad; Tanvir Naqvi (film song lyrics)
- Release date: 11 November 1946
- Running time: 122 min
- Country: British India
- Language: Hindustani
- Box office: ₹ 1,00,00,000

Anmol Ghadi (Note: Ghadi is an interesting pun here. Combined with Anmol, it means "precious nostalgic moments in time" as well as a "an invaluable watch." While the former refers to the moments young Chander and Lata spend together as friends, the latter refers to a watch that Lata presents to her friend Chander at the time of their separation. The watch later becomes for him, Lata's only remembrance, and thus invaluable) (transl. Twins Priceless moment) is a 1946 Indian drama film directed by Mehboob Khan, starring Surendra, Suraiya, Noor Jehan and Zahur Raja.

The film was a musical hit and is still remembered for its music by Naushad, with hits like "Aawaaz De Kahaan Hai", "Jawaan Hai Mohabbat Haseen Hai Zamana" and "Mere Bachpan Ke Saathi Mujhe Bhool Na Jaana". The film also featured playback singer, Mohammed Rafi's first notable song, "Tera Khilauna Toota Balak", and became the highest-grossing film at the Indian box office in 1946.

The film was an inspiration for the 2001 Telugu movie Manasantha Nuvve. The Telugu movie was remade in Hindi as Jeena Sirf Merre Liye (2002), in Kannada as Manasella Neene (2002) and in Tamil as Thithikudhe (2003).

== Plot ==
Chander and Lata were good childhood friends in Jahanabad, Lata was the daughter of a rich family, whereas Chander was the son of a poor, widowed mother. Lata's parents did not like Lata being friends with Chander. Lata's family gets transferred to Bombay. At the time of departure, Lata gifts her watch to Chander as a memento.

They grow up. Chander goes to Bombay to search for Lata. Chander's rich friend Prakash opens a musical instruments shop for Chander, where Chander can earn his livelihood by repairing musical instruments. Prakash's mother does not like Prakash spending money on Chander. Lata has become a writer, her work is published under the nickname of "Renu" aka "Renuka Devi"; Chander becomes a fan of her work. Basanti is Lata's friend. In one of her novels, Lata writes the story of the childhood friendship of Chander and Lata. Chander reads it and writes a letter to Renu (Lata) to find out how she knows of this story and if she knows Lata she can help him find her. Reading that letter, Basanti forces Lata to call Chander to meet, plotting that Basanti will meet Chander as well as Lata. Basanti meets Chander there and falls in love with him. Chander was carrying the watch gifted by Lata to him all the time, which he loses when Basanti meets him and Basanti locates it. Seeing the watch, Lata recognizes it and recognizes Chander. Basanti feels hurt and blames Lata that she had known that Basanti was in love with Chander, and even then Lata did not tell her that Chander is the same guy who Lata herself was in love with. Lata later tells her that she herself was not aware of it.

Lata's parents contact Prakash for marrying Lata. When Chander learns of it, under the lifetime of obligations to Prakash, he sacrifices his love for Lata in favour of Prakash. Chander's mother dies. Prakash marries Lata; Chander walks off into the sunset, followed by Basanti.

== Cast ==
Cast in order of the opening credits

- Noorjehan as Lata/Renuka Devi
- Surendra as Chandrabhan
- Zahur Raja as Prakash
- Suraiya as Basanti
- Leela Misra as Chandrabhan's mother
- Anwari Begum
- Bhudo Advani as Mohan
- Murad as Deputy
- Bibibai
- Amirbanu as Prakash's mother
- N. Kabir as young Chandrabhan
- Noor Mahal as young Lata
- Master Gulam Mohamed
- Wasker
- Agha Mehsher Shirazi
- Nawabkhan

== Soundtrack ==
Anmol Ghadi

Soundtrack album by Naushad
- Released: 1946
- Genre: Feature film soundtrack

Naushad chronology
Sanyasi (1945)	Anmol Ghadi (1946)	Keemat (1946)

Music: Naushad; Lyrics: Tanvir Naqvi

Track #	Song	Singer(s)	Raga
1	"Uran Khatole Pe Ud Jaoon"	Shamshad Begum and Zohrabai Ambalewali	
2	"Aaja Meri Barbaad Mohabbat Ke Sahaare"	Noor Jehan	
3	"Jawan Hai Mohabbat Haseen Hai Zamana"	Noor Jehan	
4	"Awaz De Kahan Hai"	Noor Jehan, Surendra	Pahadi
5	"Kya Mil Gaya Bhagwan"	Noor Jehan	
6	"Main Dil Mein Dard Basa Laai"	Suraiya	
7	"Socha Tha Kya Kya Ho Gaya"	Suraiya	
8	"Mere Bachpan Ke Saathi"	Noor Jehan	
9	"Kyon Yaad Aa Rahe Hain"	Surendra	
10	"Man Leta Hai Angdai"	Suraiya	
11	"Ab Kaun Hai Mera"	Surendra	
12	"Tera Khilauna Toota Balak"	Mohammed Rafi	

Tanishk Bagchi recreated Noor Jehan's "Jawan Hai Mohabbat Haseen Hai Zamana" for the 2018 Indian film Fanney Khan.

== See also ==
- Love triangle
