= Jag Biti =

1946 film

- Directed by: M. Sadiq
- Music by: Ghulam Haider
- Release date: 1946
- Country: India
- Language: Hindi

Jag Biti is a Bollywood film. It was released in 1946.
