= Sanjog (1943 film) =

- Sanjog (1943)
- Directed by: A. R. Kardar
- Written by: Prof.Waqif Moradabadi
- Produced by: A.R Karder
- Starring: Mehtab, Raj Kumar, Anwar Husain, Noor Mohammed Charlie; Ulhas; Wasti
- Cinematography: Dwarka Divecha
- Edited by: M.Mansur
- Music by: Naushad
- Production company: Kardar Productions
- Release date: 1943
- Running time: 2 Hours 3 minutes
- Country: India
- Language: Hindi

Sanjog (Hindi: संजोग, destiny, luck) is a Bollywood film. It was released in 1943.

== Plot ==
Raja Bahadur, the Maharaja of Pahad Gunj, advertises for a personal secretary. By coincidence, Captain Surendra, the Maharaja's future son-in-law, travels on the same train as Deepak, who is applying for the position, and his friend Jaggu. Due to a series of misunderstandings, Deepak is mistaken for Captain Surendra, and Jaggu convinces him to go along with it.

When they arrive at the palace, Princess Bina Kumari welcomes Deepak, unaware of his real identity. Believing him to be Captain Surendra, she places a garland around his neck and spends time with him in the palace gardens and along the riverbanks. As they grow closer, Bina falls in love with him. Deepak, however, begins to feel guilty about hiding his identity, especially as he realizes that her feelings are genuine.

Meanwhile, the real Captain Surendra arrives at the palace but is mistaken for an impostor. He is questioned, humiliated, and eventually thrown out. When he returns home, his father, Colonel Girija Shankar, refuses to believe his account of what happened.

Unable to cope with the deception and his growing feelings for Bina, Deepak eventually runs away from the palace. Back home, he finds it difficult to carry on without her. Meanwhile, Bina is arranged to meet the Colonel's son through Jaggu, who continues to act as the palace secretary. The situation takes another turn when the Colonel discovers Deepak's true identity and orders him to face a military court-martial.

== Cast ==
- Mehtab
- Noor Mohammed Charlie
- Ulhas
- Wasti
- Anwar Hussain

== Music ==
Music by Naushad and Lyrics by Deena Nath Madhok D. N. Madhok

(1) Aa More Sanware Saiyan- Suraiya

(2) Ek Dilwala Ek Dilwali- Suraiya

(3) Jaan Bachi So Lakhon Paye- Shyam Kumar

(4) Kaun Gali Ka Chhora Pukare-Hamida Banu, Shyam Kumar

(5) Kis Taraf Ko Dhyan Hai Tera- Noor Mohammed Charlie

(6) Koi Chutki Si Mere Dil Men- Suraiya

(7) Mori Gali More Raja- Suraiya

Papiha Kahe Machaye Shor- Noor Mohammed Charlie

(8) Udte Huye Panchhi- Suraiya, Noor Mohammed Charlie

(9) Palat Tera Dhyan Kidhar- Noor Mohammed Charlie
