= Mirza Ghalib (film) =

1954 film

- Directed by: Sohrab Modi
- Written by: Rajinder Singh Bedi
- Screenplay by: J. K. Nanda
- Story by: Saadat Hasan Manto
- Produced by: Sohrab Modi
- Starring: Bharat Bhushan; Suraiya; Nigar Sultana; Durga Khote; Murad; Mukri; Ulhas; Kumkum; Iftekhar; Sadat Ali
- Cinematography: V. Avadhoot
- Edited by: D. Shirdhankar; P. Balachandran
- Music by: Ghulam Mohammed
- Production company: Minerva Movietone
- Distributed by: Minerva Movietone
- Release date: 10 December 1954
- Running time: 145 minutes
- Country: India
- Languages: Hindi; Urdu

Mirza Ghalib (Hindi: मिर्ज़ा ग़ालिब; Urdu: مرزا غالب) is a 1954 Indian Hindi and Urdu language biographical film, directed by Sohrab Modi. Based on the life of well-known poet Mirza Ghalib, the film was acclaimed upon release on 10 December 1954.

It stars Bharat Bhushan as Ghalib and Suraiya as his tawaif lover, Moti Begum. The film won the President's Gold Medal for the All India Best Feature Film and the President's Silver Medal for Best Feature Film in Hindi in the 2nd National Film Awards for 1954.

The film is also considered as one of Suraiya's best performances. According to Suraiya's 1962 Star Portrait profile, the success of Mirza Ghalib as well as Shama Parwana (1954) earned "fresh laurels" for the actress.

== Plot ==
The film depicts an episode in the life of famous poet Mirza Ghalib (27 December 1797 - 18 February 1869) during the last Mughal King, Bahadur Shah Zafar's times. The story revolves around the love and admiration of Moti Begum, (named "Chaudhvin"(moon-faced) by Mirza Ghalib), played by Suraiya, for Mirza Ghalib, and its end in the tragic death of 'Chaudhvin'.

Mirza Ghalib (Bharat Bhushan) is already a married man, married to "Umrao Begum" (Nigar Sultana), who is a pious woman, in love with and in awe of her poet husband. Emperor Bahadur Shah Zafar (Iftekhar), himself a poet of considerable stature, is hosting a "mushaira" (poetry recitation session). At the "mushaira", the poetry of "Zauq" is much applauded; Mirza Asadullah Khan "Ghalib", on the other hand, finds no takers for his "ghazals" (poems). (In another scene, when ghalib is reciting out of court, even the general populace thinks his ghazals are too profound and his Urdu too difficult.) In the more intellectual environment of the mushaira, nobody except the Mufti (Murad) and the Kotwal, Hashmat Khan (Ulhas) can find anything to appreciate in Ghalib's poetry. The Mufti expresses his appreciation to Ghalib; the Kotwal spends his time hurriedly writing down the ghazal Ghalib has just recited. Ghalib instead of reciting melodiously as others do, starts by just "reading" his ghazals dryly (maybe he finds the poets below his calibre), and even calls himself a poet ("Sukhanver") par excellence in one of his ghazals. This irks some of the poets present, at which Ghalib walks out of the court.

On his way home, he hears a woman singing one of his own ghazals. The singer is Moti Begum (Suraiya), daughter of a retired tawaif (Durga Khote). Moti is mad about Ghalib's poetry, and even about the man himself, even though she has no idea what her favourite poet looks like. Ghalib, delighted that someone likes his poetry, knocks on Moti's door and is admitted. Ghalib is awestruck not just by her enthusiasm for his ghazals but also by her beauty, and addresses her as Chaudhvin Begum (chaudhvin means "full moon"). When he realises she does not know that he is Ghalib, he teases her by deprecating Ghalib's poetry. Moti, of course, leaps to her hero's defence and literally shoos the unexpected guest from her house. Right on Ghalib's heels (in fact, bumping into the poet in the doorway) comes another visitor to Moti's house: the Kotwal. He has just returned from the mushaira at the fort, bringing with him the transcript of the Ghalib ghazal he'd heard there. He hands over the ghazal to a grateful Moti, and astonishes her by identifying her recent guest as Ghalib himself.

A few days later, Ghalib comes across yet another person singing one of his ghazals. This time, it is a poor mendicant called Hafiz miyan (Tanveer Farooqui) who, when questioned, tells Ghalib that Moti Begum teaches him these ghazals so that he can sing them to earn a few paisas. Ghalib, ego well fuelled, goes off to Moti Begum's house once again, and is welcomed with much ecstatic gushing by the woman, who has now taken to calling herself Chaudhvin Begum. She is shy and demure; he is soulful. But Chaudhvin Begum is just one aspect of Ghalib's somewhat troubled life. He may be a great poet, but that greatness is not enough to keep the wolves from the door. One somewhat benevolent wolf is the moneylender Lala Mathuradas (Mukri) to whom Ghalib owes a large sum of money. Mathuradas comes by every now and then, asking for the debt to be cleared; but Ghalib always manages to fob him off.

And there is Ghalib's wife, an extremely religious woman who is tormented by the fact that none of her children have survived beyond infancy. Her relationship with her husband is one of easy camaraderie; she is his staunch supporter, a wife who never complains that they were forever in debt and who, even when she suspects that her husband is in love with another woman, does not protest or demand his love for herself. (Instead, she coaxes him to marry a second time).

Right now, however, the one facing hard times is Chaudhvin Begum. The Kotwal, Hashmat Khan, has been lusting after her and has persuaded Chaudhvin's penurious mother to give her daughter in marriage to him. He has even paid a bride price of Rs 2,000 — and Chaudhvin's mother, despite all of Chaudhvin's protests, insists that the wedding will take place. In desperation, Chaudhvin writes a letter to Ghalib and sends it to him through her doorkeeper-cum-general dogsbody, a man with a taste for liquor. The man sets out for Ghalib's house on a Tuesday, wanders into a wine shop, and emerges on Thursday, leaving Ghalib very little time to devise any very effective plan to rescue Chaudhvin from this unwanted marriage. He decides to hand over Rs 2,000 to Chaudhvin's mother; but since he does not possess that much, he sets out to 'earn' it — by gambling. He is successful, and hurries off to hand over the sum to the money-grubbing old woman.

The old woman has, in the meantime, become a changed person, all because a desperate Chaudhvin has tried to commit suicide. Suddenly overcome by a fit of maternal affection, Chaudhvin's mother heaps recriminations on the head of the just-arrived Kotwal: he will not be married to Chaudhvin, not for all the gold in the world. Much arguing ensues, but the mother stands firm and the Kotwal is left fuming and vowing vengeance — mainly on Ghalib.

The Kotwal tries to take revenge on Ghalib. Meanwhile, Ghalib's feelings for Chaudhvin Begum grow, and his wife becomes more frustrated: she is jealous of Chaudhvin Begum, but she also wants her husband to be happy. All of this happens while Delhi is changing, as the emperor's formal power passes to the British Resident.

== Cast ==
- Bharat Bhushan as Mirza Ghalib
- Suraiya as Moti Begum alias Chaudhvin Begum
- Durga Khote as Moti Begum's Mother
- Ulhas as Kotwal Hashmat Khan
- Nigar Sultana as Umrao Begum (Ghalib's Wife)
- Jagdish Sethi as Umrao Begum's father
- Indira
- Murad as Mufti Sadruddin
- Mukri as Lala Mathuradas
- Iftekhar as Bahadur Shah Zafar
- Tanveer Farooqui as Hafiz
- Kumkum as courtesan

== Soundtrack ==
The music was composed by Ghulam Mohammed. The songs and ghazals were rendered by Suraiya, Mohammed Rafi, Talat Mahmood, Shamshad Begum, Sudha Malhotra and Bande Hassan, film songs lyrics are by the 19th century poet Mirza Ghalib. Certain additional lyrics for the film were penned by Shakeel Badayuni.

Ghazal/ Song	Singer(s)	Poet/ Lyricist	Music Director	Raga
"Nahin Ishq Mein Iska Toh Ranj Humen	Mohammed Rafi	Bahadur Shah Zafar	No	
"Hai Bas Ke Har Ek Unke Ishaare Mein Nishaan Aur..."	Mohammed Rafi	Mirza Ghalib	Ghulam Mohammed	
"Nukta Cheen Hai Gham-e-Dil Usko Sunaaye Na Baney..."	Suraiya	Mirza Ghalib	Ghulam Mohammed	
"Aah Ko Chahiye Ek Umar Asar Hone Tak..."	Suraiya	Mirza Ghalib	Ghulam Mohammed	
"Yeh Na Thhi Hamari Kismat Ke Visaal-e-Yaar Hota..."	Suraiya	Mirza Ghalib	Ghulam Mohammed	Bhimpalasi
"Rahiye Ab Aisi Jagah Chal Kar, Jahan Koi Na Ho..."	Suraiya	Mirza Ghalib	Ghulam Mohammed	
"Humne Maana Ke Taghaful Na Karoge Lekin..."	Suraiya	Mirza Ghalib	Ghulam Mohammed	
"Dil-e-Nadaan Tujhe Hua Kya Hai, Aakhir Iss Marz Ki Dawa Kya Hai..."	Talat Mahmood and Suraiya	Mirza Ghalib	Ghulam Mohammed	
"Ishq Mujhko Nahin Wahshat Hi Sahi..."	Talat Mahmood	Mirza Ghalib	Ghulam Mohammed	
"Phir Mujhe Deeda-E-Tar Yaad Aaya..."	Talat Mahmood	Mirza Ghalib	Ghulam Mohammed	
"Sakhi Sarkar Hai Teri, Gareebon Ka Tu Daata Hai..."	Mohammed Rafi and Bande Hassan	Shakeel Badayuni	Ghulam Mohammed	
"Chali Pee Ke Nagar, Ab Kaahe Ka Darr, More Banke..."	Shamshad Begum	Shakeel Badayuni	Ghulam Mohammed	
"Ganga Ki Reti Pe, Bangla Chhawai De, Saiyaan Teri..."	Sudha Malhotra	Shakeel Badayuni	Ghulam Mohammed	

== Reception ==
=== Critical reception ===
While reviewing the film, Samira Sood of The Print called Suraiya the "soul" of the film and stated: "This movie belongs to Suraiya, whose voice communicates not only love, longing, hope and heartbreak, but the centuries-old magic of Ghalib." She added, "The beauty of the film, is that it actually doesn’t focus so much on Ghalib’s life yet manages to bring his words alive. And the reason for that is Suraiya. Ghalib’s verses with Suraiya’s golden voice and Ghulam Mohammad’s lilting tunes that are still hummed today."

=== Box office ===
Mirza Ghalib (1954 film) was the fourth highest grossing film, among the Top Earners at the Box Office in India in 1954.

== Awards ==
- National Film Awards
  - 1954: National Film Award for Best Feature Film
  - 1954: National Film Award for Best Feature Film in Hindi
- Filmfare Awards
  - Filmfare Award for Best Art Direction (B&W): Rusi K. Banker

== Legacy ==
Suraiya's acting and singing (of Mirza Ghalib's ghazals) was widely praised it is regarded among her best performances. In 1954, Suraiya was specially applauded by the Prime Minister, Jawahar Lal Nehru, who remarked to her: "You have brought back Ghalib to life", in a special screening of the film at Rashtrapati Bhavan.|quote=Mirza Ghalib was made memorable by some melodious numbers. Her work moved Prime Minister Jawaharlal Nehru so much that he complimented the singing star by saying, "Tumne to Mirza Ghalib ki rooh ko zinda kar diya". Suraiya later stated that she thought his praise was "more worthy than an Oscar". In 1998, Suraiya was honoured for perpetuating Ghalib's memory by her acting and songs by the then Prime Minister of India, Atal Behari Vajpayee during the Mirza Ghalib bi-centenary celebrations in New Delhi.
