= Nai Duniya =

1942 film

- Directed by: Abdul Rashid Kardar
- Starring: P. Jairaj; Shobhana Samarth; Mazhar Khan
- Music by: Naushad
- Release date: 1942
- Country: India
- Language: Hindi

Nai Duniya is a 1942 Bollywood film directed by Abdul Rashid Kardar and starring P. Jairaj, Shobhana Samarth, and Mazhar Khan.

Suraiya sang her first song; "Boot Karun Mein Polish, Babu" with Naushad as the music director in this film.
