= Cinema of Pakistan =

Overview of Pakistani film culture

Cinema of Pakistan سنیما پاکستان
- No. of screens: 150 screens (2024)
- Main distributors: ARY Films; Hum Films; Geo Films; Urdu 1 Pictures; Six Sigma Plus; Eveready Pictures; One Films; A-Plus Films; Dawn Films

Produced feature films (2023)
- Total: 100+

Number of admissions
- Total: 250,000,000

The film industry of Pakistan, consisting of motion pictures, has had a large effect on Pakistani society and culture since the nation's independence. The film industry in Pakistan is centred in three main cities: Lahore, Karachi and Peshawar. Pakistani cinema is made up of various sub-industries, including Lollywood, which makes motion pictures in Urdu and Punjabi. Lollywood is one of the biggest film industries in the country.

Pakistani cinema includes films made in various Pakistani languages, which reflect the linguistic diversity of the country itself. The largest language-based film industries in the country include Punjabi, Urdu, Pashto, Sindhi, and Balochi cinema.

Pakistani cinema has played an important part in the country's culture. In recent years, it has begun flourishing again after years of decline, catering to audiences in Pakistan and expatriates abroad. Several film industries are based in Pakistan, which tend to be regional and niche in nature.

Between 1947 and 2007, Pakistani cinema was predominantly based in Lahore, home to the nation's largest film industry (nicknamed Lollywood). Pakistani films during this period attracted large audiences and had a strong cult following. They were a part of the mainstream culture, and were widely available and imitated by the masses. During the early 1970s, Pakistan was the world's fourth-largest producer of feature films.

Throughout the 1980s and 1990s, the film industry went through several periods of ups and downs, a reflection of its dependency on state funding and incentives. By 2000, the film industry in Lahore had collapsed and saw a gradual shift of Pakistani actors, actresses, producers and filmmakers from Lahore to Karachi.

By 2007, the wounds of Pakistan's collapsed film industry began to heal and Karachi had cemented itself as the new center of Pakistani cinema. Over the subsequent years, a new generation of producers entered the industry, bringing developments such as novel storylines, shorter films, and new technology. This led to the popularity of an alternative form of Pakistani cinema. The shift has been seen by many as the leading cause for what has been referred to as the "resurgence of Pakistani cinema". Despite the crisis starting in the mid-1970s, Pakistani films have retained much of their distinctive identity, and since the shift to Karachi, they have regained their following.

In 2022, Joyland became the first Pakistani film to be screened at the Cannes Film Festival. It was also selected as the nation's entry for Best International Feature Film at the 95th Academy Awards and was shortlisted for the award.

== Statistics ==
Over 14,000 Urdu feature films have been produced in Pakistan since 1948, as well as over 10,000 in Punjabi, over 8,000 in Pashto, over 4,000 in Sindhi, and 1,000 in Balochi. The first film ever produced in Pakistan was Husn Ka Daku in 1929, directed by Abdur Rashid Kardar in Lahore. The first ever Pakistani-film produced was Teri Yaad, directed by Daud Chand in 1948.

Pakistan Film Magazine, established in 1999, is the most extensive online database dedicated to Pakistani cinema; as of 2013, it had catalogued over 4,000 films, approximately 4,500 film artists, and around 6,500 film songs.

As of 2025, there were an estimated 6,000 performing artists and 9,000 production crew members from various sectors in the country.

== History ==
=== Silent Era (1929–1946) ===
The history of cinema in Pakistan began in 1929, when Abdur Rashid Kardar set up a studio and production company under the name of United Players Corporation (later renamed Playart Phototone), which would become the foundation stone for the Lahore film industry. After scouting for locations, he settled for their offices to be established at Ravi Road. The dimly-lit area presented difficulties as shootings were only possible in daylight, but nevertheless, the area had some very important landmarks like the Ravi Forest and the tombs of Mughal emperor Jahangir and his wife Nur Jahan. It is reported that the team working at the studios would commute on tangas and even lost equipment once while traveling on the bumpy roads on the horse-drawn carriage.

However basic and crude their working conditions were, Kardar believed in his work and in 1929 he produced the first silent film in Lahore under his studio's banner, Husn Ka Daku (Mysterious Eagle). The film was only mildly successful at cinemas, but it managed to establish Lahore as a functioning center of a film industry. Kardar then decided to focus on direction, not acting. Immediately afterwards, the studio released the film Sarfarosh (Brave Heart) in 1930; in 1931, the films Farebi Daku (Mysterious Bandit) and Khooni Katar (The Bloody Dagger) were released. All three of these starred Gul Hamid in the lead role, and had similar supporting casts. None of the films was able to stir much noise about the Lahore film industry; in the 1930s, as the nascent Urdu-language industry was forming, many Hindi and Punjabi language films were also being screened in the area.

Another early producer was Roop K. Shorey, who, upon hearing of Lahore's growing film industry, returned to his hometown and produced Qismat Ke Haer Pher (Life After Death) in 1932. In 1946, Sajjad Gul's father Agha G. A. Gul set up Evernew Studios on Multan Road. The following year, Eveready Pictures was established by J.C. Anand, which would go on to become the largest film production and distribution company in Pakistan.

=== Independence and growth (1947–1959) ===
In 1947, after Pakistan was created out of British India, Lahore became the hub of cinema in Pakistan. By 1947 there were around 80 cinemas in East Bengal. In March 1948, when the Governor-General of Pakistan Mohammad Ali Jinnah came to visit East Bengal, the radio broadcaster and filmmaker Nazir Ahmed was commissioned to create the informational film In Our Midst with the help of Calcutta-based film technicians. It was the first informational film of the province (now Bangladesh). Upon independence, there was a shortage of funds and filming equipment, which initially paralysed the film industry. Despite these obstacles, the first Pakistani feature film, Teri Yaad was released on 7 August 1948, and premiered at the Parbat Theatre in Lahore.

It was in the 1950s that the industry's fortunes changed. In earlier years, Pakistani films had been met with lukewarm reception and failed to perform well at box offices. This changed with the release of Do Ansoo on 7 April 1950, which became the nation's first film to attain a 25-week viewing and silver jubilee status. Noor Jehan's directorial debut Chanway was released on 29 April 1951, and was also commercially successful. This was the first Pakistani film directed by a woman. In the second half of the decade, higher-budget films began to be made, a trend begun by the producer Syed Faqir Ahmad Shah in 1955 and this trend continued in his second production Jagga in 1958, directed by his son Saqlain Rizvi. The film remained mediocre in the cinema.

As cinema viewership increased, the industry found more success. The 1954 film Sassi, produced by Eveready Pictures, reached golden jubilee status, and the 1959 film Umar Marvi was the first Pakistani film made in Sindhi. The playback singer Ahmed Rushdi's career also began during this period, after singing his first song in Bander Road Se Kemari.

To celebrate the success of these endeavours, film journalist Ilyas Rashidi launched an annual awarding event on 17 July 1957. Named the Nigar Awards, the event has become Pakistan's most prominent awards event for filmmaking.

=== The Golden Era (1959–1977) ===
The 1960s is often called the golden era of Pakistani cinema, and it was then that the first generation of Pakistani cinema's legends were introduced. As black and white films became obsolete, colour films such as Munshi Dil's Azra in 1962, Zahir Raihan's Sangam (first full-length coloured film) in 1964, and Mala (first coloured cinema-scope film). Also released in 1962 were Shaheed, which introduced the Palestine conflict to Pakistanis in cinemas and became an instant hit, and Charagh Jalta Raha, which marked the debut of the influential Mohammad Ali and was premiered by Fatima Jinnah on 9 March 1962 at Nishat Cinema in Karachi.

In September 1965, following the war between Pakistan and India, all Indian films were completely banned. Although a light ban had existed since 1952 in West Pakistan and since 1962 in East Pakistan, this was enforced more strictly in the war's aftermath. Pakistani cinemas did not suffer much from the decision to remove the films and instead received better attendances.

Realising the potential for success in film, Waheed Murad entered the industry then. His persona led people to call him the "chocolate hero." His 1966 film Armaan was one of the most cherished Urdu films to ever be released. The film is said to have given birth to Pakistani pop music, by introducing playback singing legends like composer Sohail Rana and singer Ahmed Rushdi. The film became the first to complete a 75-week screening at cinemas throughout the country, thus attaining a platinum jubilee status. Waheed Murad was picturised in a song for the first time ever in director Saqlain Rizvi's Mamta, released in 1963. Another rising star during this period was Nadeem Baig, who received instant stardom with his debut film Chakori in 1967.

Horror films were introduced with the release of Zinda Laash, making it the first Pakistani film to display an R rating tag on its posters. Meanwhile, Eastern Films Magazine, a tabloid edited by Said Haroon, became a popular magazine for film-lovers in Pakistan. It featured a question and answer section titled "Yours Impishly," for which the sub-editor Asif Noorani took inspiration from I. S. Johar's page in India's Filmfare magazine. Tabloids like these got their first controversial covers with the release of Neela Parbat on 3 January 1969, which became Pakistan's first feature-film with an adults-only tag. It ran for only three-to-four days at the box office. More controversial yet would be the offering of distribution rights in the Middle East to the Palestinian guerrilla organisation, Al Fatah, by the writer, producer, and director Riaz Shahid for his film Zarqa released on 17 October 1969. It depicted the activities of the organisation.

Towards the late 1960s and early 1970s, political turmoil once again returned with the East Pakistan conflict brewing. Amidst concerns, the film Dosti, was released on 7 February 1971 and turned out to be the first indigenous Urdu film to complete 101 weeks of success at the box office, making it the first recipient of a diamond jubilee. As political uncertainty took charge of the entertainment industry, filmmakers were asked to consider the socio-political impacts of their films. For instance, the makers of Tehzeeb, released on 20 November 1971, were asked to change the lyrics of a song that might have proved detrimental to the diplomatic relations between Egypt and Pakistan. So vulnerable was the film industry to the changing political landscape that in 1976, an angry mob set fire to a cinema in Quetta just before the release of the first Balochi film, Hammal O Mahganj.

Javed Jabbar's Beyond the Last Mountain, released on 2 December 1976, was Pakistan's first venture into English film-making. The Urdu version Musafir did not do well at the box office. Signs of trouble slowly began in the cinema industry as VCRs and piracy became an issue.

=== Decline (1977–1990) ===
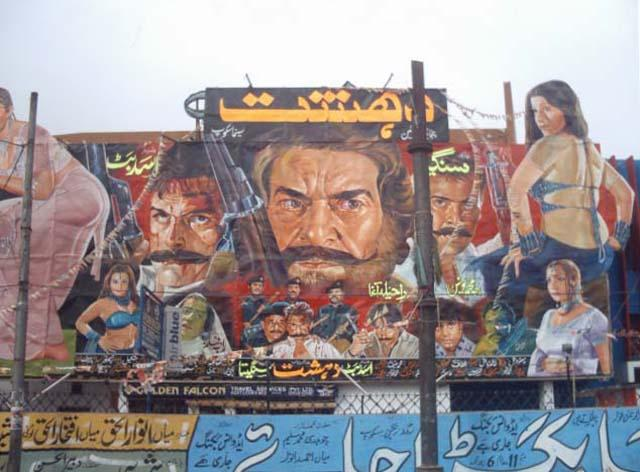
Gundasa culture in Lollywood

Pakistani cinema entered into a decline during the regime of Muhammad Zia-ul-Haq (1978–1988), who began his Islamization process across the country. One of the first victims of this sociopolitical change was Pakistani cinema. Imposition of new registration laws for film producers requiring filmmakers to be degree holders, where not many were, led to a steep decline in the workings of the industry. The government forcibly closed most of the cinemas in Lahore. New tax rates were introduced, further decreasing cinema attendances. Other factors such as VCRs and film piracy had a negative effect on the growth of the industry.

Aina, released on 18 March 1977, marked a distinct symbolic break between the former prime minister Zulfikar Ali Bhutto years and the increasingly conservative cum revolutionary Muhammad Zia-ul-Haq regime. The film stayed in cinemas for over 400 weeks, with its last screening at the Scala in Karachi, where it ran for more than four years. It is considered the most popular Pakistan film ever. Films dropped from a total output of 98 in 1979, of which 42 were in Urdu, to only 58 films of which 26 were in Urdu in 1980.

The film industry by now was on the verge of collapse as people began turning away from cinema. The filmmakers that remained in the industry, produced super hits like Punjabi cult classic Maula Jatt in 1979, telling the story of a gandasa-carrying protagonist waging a blood-feud with a local gangster. While Maula Jatt paved the way for films based on rural and violent anti-hero, in terms of dress, conduct, speech, and values, Maula was at odds with previous presentations of heroes and ideals of nation-building. Similarly, Aurat Raj, released in 1979, is another film, which is hailed for its feminist narrative. Growing censorship policies against displays of affection, rather than violence, came as a blow to the industry. As a result, violence-ridden Punjabi films prevailed and overshadowed Urdu cinema. The middle class neglected the 'increasingly dilapidated and rowdy cinemas'. This film sub-culture came to be known as the gandasa culture. In Punjabi cinema, Sultan Rahi and Anjuman became iconic figures of this culture. In Pashto cinema, filmmakers were able to get around the censor policies and filled their films with soft-core pornography to increase viewership. This was done by the backing of powerful politicians.

The once romantic and lovable image of Pakistani cinema in the 1960s and 1970s had transformed into a culture of violence and vulgarity by the 1980s. This came while the government under Zia-ul-Haq's regime was attempting to "Islamise" the country. Being an actress associated with the current productions became an understandable taboo and many middle-class people began shunning these films. Nevertheless, the influx of refugees from Afghanistan, who were denied entertainment in their own country, kept Pashto cinema alive, while Punjabi cinema was fueled by young single men from the rural areas of Punjab.

In 1983, legendary actor Waheed Murad died, which was yet another blow to the cinema industry. Some claim he committed suicide while the media attributed his death to his disheartened view in the wake of Pakistani cinema's collapse. The director of his unfinished film Hero, employed 'cheat shots' to complete the film and released to sold out cinemas across the country. This enthusiasm soon disappeared and not even Pakistan's first science fiction film, Shaani, in 1989, directed by Saeed Rizvi employing elaborate special effects, could save the industry. It received awards at the Moscow Film Festival, in Egypt, and in Korea, but was shelved in Pakistan.

=== Collapse (1990–2002) ===
At the start of the 1990s, Pakistan's film industry was gripped with certain doom. Of the several dozen studios across the country, only 11 were operational producing around 100 films annually. By now the annual output dropped to around 40 films, all produced by a single studio. Other productions would be independent of any studio usually financed by the filmmakers themselves. This number would lower further as studios went towards producing short-plays and television commercials. The death of Waheed Murad in 1983 was only the start of the demise of iconic cinema stars of the 60s which further led to decreased interest. Noor Jehan quit from playback singing, Sultan Rahi was murdered in 1996, director Sangeeta put her career on hold to attend to family life while Nazrul Islam died. Controversy raged over the 1998 film Jinnah, produced by Akbar Salahuddin Ahmed and directed by Jamil Dehlavi. Objections were raised over the choice of actor Christopher Lee as the protagonist depicting Muhammad Ali Jinnah and inclusion of Indian Shashi Kapoor as archangel Gabriel in the cast combined with the experimental nature of the script. Imran Aslam, editor of The News International, said the author wrote the script in a "haze of hashish". By 1999, a surge of new films began releasing. Haathi Meray Saathi produced and distributed by Eveready Pictures celebrated its Golden Jubilee bringing audience back to the cinema for 66 weeks. Other hits were Syed Noor's 1995 film Jeeva, Saeed Rizvi's Sarkata Insaan and his 1997 film Tilismih Jazira. 1998 saw the release of Noor's Choorian, a Punjabi film that grossed Rs180 million rupees. In 1999, a Russian-Pakistani joint venture was produced and Samina Peerzada's Inteha. Other notable productions of the late 90s included Deewane Tere Pyar Ke, Mujhe Chand Chahiye, Sangam, Tere Pyar Mein, and Ghar Kab Aao Gay, which attempted to get away from formulaic and violent story lines. It was predicted that Pakistani cinema would have a revival. However, the public did not respond and low attendance at cinemas were recorded as the lower middle class shunned these films. The industry was pronounced dead by the start of the new millennium. By the early 2000s "an industry that once produced an average of 80 films annually was now struggling to even churn out more than two films a year". Partial successes were recorded with Larki Panjaban and Javed Sheikh's Yeh Dil Aap Ka Huwa grossing over Rs200 million rupees.

=== Revival and resurgence (2003–2011) ===
By 2003, young filmmakers in Karachi began experimenting with film and released low budget films to demonstrate that high quality content could be produced in Pakistan using limited resources. Cinema houses were declining in all major cities and a revival of cinema was being echoed throughout the media. With privatization of television stations in full swing, a new channel Filmazia began airing old Pakistani films as well as newer low budget productions. During this period Mahesh Bhatt, a celebrated Indian director, visited Pakistan looking for talent - particularly singers who could lend their voices to his upcoming films in India. His visit to Pakistan was to coincide with the third Kara Film Festival where he screened his film Paap in Karachi. Bhatt would later hire Atif Aslam for the soundtrack of his film Zeher and Pakistani actress Meera to play a lead-role in one of his films. By 2005, a gradual shift had begun whereby Karachi was replacing Lahore as the Urdu film hub of the country. Before 2005, Lahore was a film hub for both Punjabi and Urdu films. Many film makers, producers, directors shifted to Karachi to avail new opportunities. In August 2007, Shoaib Mansoor directed and released Khuda Ke Liye - it became a surprise instant success at the box office and brought the middle class back to the cinemas due to its controversial theme of addressing Pakistan's social problems. The film was also released internationally, including India, where it became the first Pakistani film released there after four decades. The release of Khuda Kay Liye is seen by many as the revival of cinema in Pakistan and the cementing of Karachi as the Pakistani film and showbiz capital. Despite optimism of a solid revival, progress continued to be slow. Alongside Geo Films, the "Pakistan New Cinema Movement" was launched in 2009 with around 1400 members which facilitated networking to stimulate newer film productions. Several films were released after Khuda Kay Liye which saw limited success including Shaan Shahid's directorial project Chup, Syed Noor's Price of Honor, Iqbal Kashmiri's Devdas, Son of Pakistan, Syed Faisal Bukhari's Saltanat, Reema Khan's Love Mein Ghum., 'Bhai Log' and Mehreen Jabbar's Ramchand Pakistani. However it was Shoaib Mansoor to the rescue again with his 2011 film Bol which broke box office records in Pakistan.

=== New wave (2011–present) ===
Shoaib Mansoor's Bol seemed to have officially "revived" the cinema of Pakistan. 2013 brought with it seven Pakistani films that were theatrically released in Pakistan, and led commentators to ponder whether it was time to announce the heralding of a 'new wave' of Pakistani cinema. Since 2011 from the digital scene two films have stood out with box office success as highest grossing Pakistani films; Waar followed by Main Hoon Shahid Afridi.

Shoaib Mansoor's Khuda Kay Liye (2007) and Bol (2011) seemed to have ushered in the revival of Pakistani cinema. By 2013, several Pakistani films were theatrically released - the first time in over a decade. It led commentators to speculate whether it was time to announce the heralding of a 'new wave' of Pakistani cinema. 2013 proved to be a great year for Pakistani cinema. In March, Siyaah (meaning Pitch black) was the first horror thriller film to be released in Pakistan in over 20 years. Directed by Azfar Jafri and written by Osman Khalid Butt, the film starred Hareem Farooq, Qazi Jabbar, Mahnoor Usman and Ahmed Ali Akbar. The film was about a dissociative identity disorder patient who uses black magic against unsuspecting relatives. The film collected over ₨2.65 crore (US$260,000) at the box office. The following month Chambaili, an Urdu-language political thriller film directed by Ismail Jilani, was released starring Salmaan Peerzada, Khalid Ahmed, Mohammed Ehteshamuddin, Maira Khan, Shafqat Cheema and Ghulam Mohiuddin also made a special appearance. The film was a political drama exploring the subject of political corruption in Pakistan. Since the flower 'Chambaili' (lily flower) is the national flower of Pakistan, the film-makers' intentions were to encourage patriotism and nationalism in Pakistan. The film made Rs. 20 million (US$72,000) at the box office. Waar (Wār; IPA: [ʋɑːr], meaning "The Strike") was the winner of 2013. The action-thriller film directed by Bilal Lashari and written and produced by Hassan Rana featured Shaan Shahid, Meesha Shafi, Ali Azmat, Shamoon Abbasi, Ayesha Khan and Kamran Lashari. At the time of its release, it became the highest-grossing Pakistani film ever. This was broken by 2015 release of Jawani Phir Nahi Ani. The film depicts events surrounding the war on terror in Pakistan, including the attack on a Police Academy in Lahore in 2009. Several other films were also released between April and October including Ishq Khuda directed by Shahzad Rafique, Josh: Independence Through Unity directed by Iram Parveen Bilal, Main Hoon Shahid Afridi directed by Syed Ali Raza Usama, Zinda Bhaag by Meenu Gaur and Seedlings by Mansoor Mujahid. Main Hoon Shahid Afridi was an action-drama film directed by Syed Ali Raza Usama and produced by Humayun Saeed and Shahzad Nasib. The film starred Humayun Saeed, Javed Shaikh and Noman Habib in the lead roles. Nadeem Baig, Shafqat Cheema, Ismail Tara, Ainy Jaffri, Hamza Ali Abbasi and Shehzad Sheikh also played important roles in the film, whilst Shahid Afridi and Ayesha Omar made special appearances. The film earned Rs. 22 million (US$79,000) in its first week of release. However, as some commentators cautioned, declaring a film a 'hit' or a 'flop' is determined by the relationship of the budget spent and box office returns of a film and therefore several of the top-grossing films of Pakistan were technically not a 'hit'. Nonetheless, the lack of box office returns of a Pakistani film has less to do with the film itself but more to do with the severely limited number of screens in Pakistan. Zinda Bhaag (Run For Your Life) has been critically acclaimed with reviewers calling it 'the best film to have come out of modern-day Pakistani cinema' and a "new metaphor for Pakistani cinema" that "bode(d) well for the possibility of noteworthy Pakistani imports in years to come". Zinda Bhaag went on to be Pakistan's official submission to the Oscars, the first after a gap of fifty years but did not make the final shortlist nominees. The resurgence of new Pakistani film productions centres around the use of digital equipment and makes use of cheaper distribution with DCP compliant cinemas which started to convert around 2011, increasing rapidly to 2014 with around 30 cinemas nationwide.

2014 proved to be an equally great year, with Na Maloom Afraad (Unidentified Persons) taking the 2014 box office. The Pakistani comedy thriller film was co-written and directed by Nabeel Qureshi as his directorial debut. The film starred Javed Sheikh, Fahad Mustafa, Mohsin Abbas Haider with supporting cast of Urwa Hocane, Kubra Khan and Salman Shahid. The story follows Shakeel (Sheikh), Farhaan (Mustafa) and Moon (Haider), three poor struggling individuals who chase every possible means of becoming rich, all getting into trouble as they struggle to fulfill their desires and ambitions through questionably moral ways. Other films released in 2014 included Tamanna directed by Steven Moore, Sultanat directed by Syed Faisal Bukhari, Dukhtar directed by Afia Nathaniel, and O21 directed by Jami.

2015 picked off from the momentum of 2014 and 2013. Jalaibee (meaning twist) was a caper action thriller film directed and written by Yasir Jaswal, produced by Eman Syed. Jalaibee was a joint production of ARY Films and Redrum Films in association with Sermad Films and Jaswal Films. The film starred prominent TV actors Danish Taimoor and Ali Safina in lead roles along with Adnan Jaffar, Sajid Hasan, Uzair Jaswal, Wiqar Ali Khan, Sabeeka Imam and Zhalay Sarhadi. Jalaibee was the first Pakistani film to be shot with the Arri Alexa camera. and was about the intertwined stories of numerous characters who are all struggling with their problems, and who somehow connect on a unifying level. The film collected Rs. 5 million (US$18,000) before its release as Malik Riaz had bought 10,000 tickets in advance. The film had a good number of public previews came out well on them collecting Rs. 1 million (US$3,600) which is biggest preview collections ever in Pakistan. In total, the film collected Rs. 7.50 crore (US$270,000) at domestic box office and around Rs. 3 crore (US$110,000) overseas, taking lifetime gross to Rs. 10.5 crore (US$380,000) at the end of April. In May, Pakistan's first 3D computer animated film was released. 3 Bahadur (lit. 'three brave ones') was produced and directed by Sharmeen Obaid Chinoy. It was the first instalment in the franchise 3 Bahadur (film series) and was co-produced by Waadi Animations (a joint-venture of SOC films) and ARY Films. 3 Bahadur became Pakistan's first computer-animated feature-length film. The film focuses on three eleven-year-old friends, who rise from the unlikeliest of places to save their community from the evils that plague it. The film is set in a fictional town called Roshan Basti (town of light). Equipped with courage and super powers, they battle against the odds and stand up to injustice to restore peace and harmony in their once thriving community and live a very happy life. The film was theatrically released ARY Films. It became the highest-grossing animated film at the local box office breaking the previous record of Rio 2. It grossed Rs. 6.63 crore (US$240,000) after 50 days of successful run in cinemas and became 7th highest-grossing film in Pakistani cinema history. Between July and September, a number of films were released beginning with Bin Roye (Without Crying). The romantic drama film directed by Momina Duraid and Shahzad Kashmiri starred Mahira Khan, Humayun Saeed, Armeena Khan, Zeba Bakhtiar, and Javed Sheikh. One of the movie's songs is directed by Haissam Hussain. The film was based on the original novel Bin Roye Ansoo by Farhat Ishtiaq and released worldwide on 18 18 July 2015, the day of Eid-ul-Fitr. Bin Roye was praised by the critics. It broke all records on international markets becoming one of the highest grossing Pakistani films. The film Bin Roye was later adapted into a television series with the same name, that premiered on Hum TV on 2 October 2016. Its success was followed by Jawani Phir Nahi Ani which became the highest-grossing film of 2015 and breaking all box office records on domestic markets. The year saw some of the most critically acclaimed Pakistani films, including Moor and Manto. These films raised the standards for Pakistani films.

2016 continued the momentum of new age Pakistani cinema. Ho Mann Jahaan was released on 1 January, starring Adeel Hussain, Mahira Khan, Sheheryar Munawar, and Sonya Jehan, along with veteran Bushra Ansari. The film opened to a highly successful box office weekend and went on to run for several weeks, making it the third-highest-grossing film of 2016, earning Rs.22.50 crores in total. Janaan and Actor In Law both opened on Eid weekend, becoming the highest and second-highest-grossing films of 2016, respectively, earning Rs.24 crores and Rs.17.5 crores at the local box office and Rs.30 crores at the international box office.

In the early 2020s, a stylistic pivot toward "grounded sci-fi" emerged within the Pakistani independent film circuit, characterized by a move away from traditional social dramas and "misery cinema" tropes. This movement, led by filmmakers such as Suhail Ahmed and Sheryar Ali, focuses on genre-bending storytelling that utilizes local urban heritage most notably the Walled City of Lahore as a backdrop for high-concept speculative narratives. Their project A Door to My Memory (Yaadon De Buhe) served as a key example of this shift, gaining international recognition at the 20th Tasveer Film Festival, an Oscar-qualifying platform, for its fusion of South Asian cultural texture with science fiction themes.

2022 gave a kick to Pakistani-punjabi cinema when movie The Legend of Maula Jatt starring Mahira Khan, Fawad Khan alongside Hamza Ali Abbasi and directed by Bilal Lashari broke all time record worldwide record of Pakistani films.2025, Seemab Gul directed, produced and wrote "Ghost School" which initially was banned by the sindh government but later got approval to show to public.It had its premiere at the Toronto International Film Festival on September 2025.

== Film festivals ==
- Kara Film Festival
- LUMS International Film Festival (FiLUMS)
- Pakistan Film Festival - New York
- Pakistan International Film Festival
- Lahore Eurasia Film Festival – University of Lahore

== Awards ==
- Nigar Awards
- PTV Awards
- Lux Style Awards
- ARY Film Awards
- Pakistan Media Awards
- Hum Awards
- Pakistan International Screen Awards
- IPPA Awards (International Pakistan Prestige Awards)

== See also ==
- List of cinema of the world
- Lists of Pakistani films
- List of highest-grossing Pakistani films
- List of Pakistani male actors
- List of Pakistani actresses
- Shahnoor Studios – one of the oldest film studios in Lahore
