= Farebi Daku =

1931 film

- Directed by: A. R. Kardar
- Produced by: United Players Corporation
- Starring: Gul Hamid; Gulzar; Nazir; M. Ismail
- Cinematography: K. V. Machve
- Production company: Playart Phototone/United Player's Corporation
- Release date: 1931
- Country: British India
- Language: Silent film

Farebi Daku also called Mysterious Bandit is a 1931 action silent film produced and directed by A. R. Kardar. Kardar set up his own production company "United Players Corporation" in 1928 and in quick succession produced and directed seven pictures, Husn Ka Daku (1929), Safdar Jung (1930), Sarfarosh (1930), Farebi Shahzada (1931), Khooni Katar (1931), Farebi Daku and The Wandering Dancer or Awara Raqasa. Awara Raqasa was the only film out of the seven produced by Kardar, which was directed by J. K. Nanda, who had received his direction and cinematography training in Germany.

Farebi Daku was the final film produced under Kardar's United Players banner and again starred the popular cast from his last three films, Gulzar and Nazir in the main cast with M. Ismail as the villain. Nazir, who owned a clothes shop, sold it and joined Kardar, who cast him in Khooni Katar (1931) and Farebi Daku. The rest of the cast included Gul Hamid, M. Ismail, Hiralal, and Ghulam Qadir.

== Cast ==
- Gul Hamid
- Gulzar
- Nazir
- M. Ismail
- M. Zahoor
- Haider Shah
- Fazal Shah
