= Safdar Jung (film) =

1930 film

- Directed by: A. R. Kardar
- Produced by: Playart Phototone
- Starring: Gul Hamid; Mumtaz Begum; Gulzar; Hiralal
- Cinematography: K. V. Machve
- Production company: Playart Phototone/United Player's Corporation
- Release date: 1930
- Country: British India
- Language: Silent film

Safdar Jung is a 1930 action costume silent film directed by A. R. Kardar. The film was the third to be produced by Kardar's United Players Pictures (Playart Phototone), following Husn Ka Daku (1929) and Sarfarosh (1930).

Kardar introduced Mumtaz Begum as the lead heroine in the film. The cast included Gulzar, Mumtaz, and Hiralal. The director of photography was K. V. Machve.

Safdar Jung was the first of seven silent films Gul Hamid worked in. A police officer in the British Police by profession, he was chosen by Kardar as a leading man due to Hamid's "overall persona".

Like the rest of the films produced earlier, Safdar Jung was also released at The Deepak cinema in Bhati Gate area of Lahore.

== Cast ==
- Gul Hamid
- Mumtaz Begum
- Gulzar
- Hiralal
