= Fareb =

Fareb (lit. 'deceit') may refer to:

- Fareb (1996 film), an Indian thriller film
- Fareb (2005 film), an Indian romantic thriller film
- Fareb (TV series), a 1993 Pakistani television series

== See also ==
- Farebi, 1974 Indian film
- Farebi Daku, 1931 Indian film
- Farebi Shahzada, 1931 Indian film
