= List of mosques in Lahore =

This is a list of mosques in the city of Lahore, Pakistan. This city has remained capital of Delhi Sultanate and Mughal Empire at various times, thus hosting multiple mosques from that era.

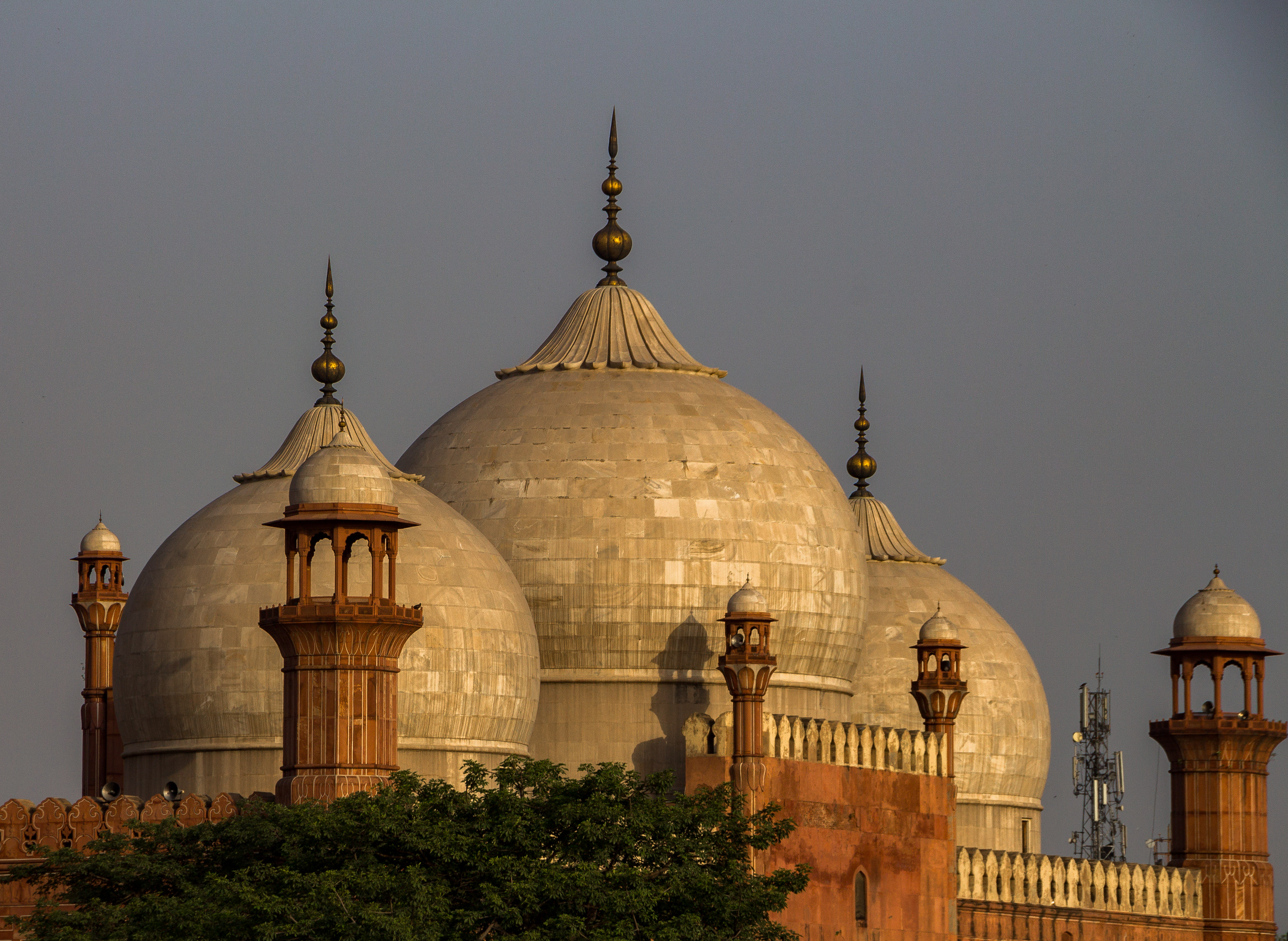
Badshahi Mosque (built 1673) in the Walled City, Lahore.

== Before 1500 CE ==
- Neevin Mosque, 1460 CE

== 1500 CE – 1900 CE ==
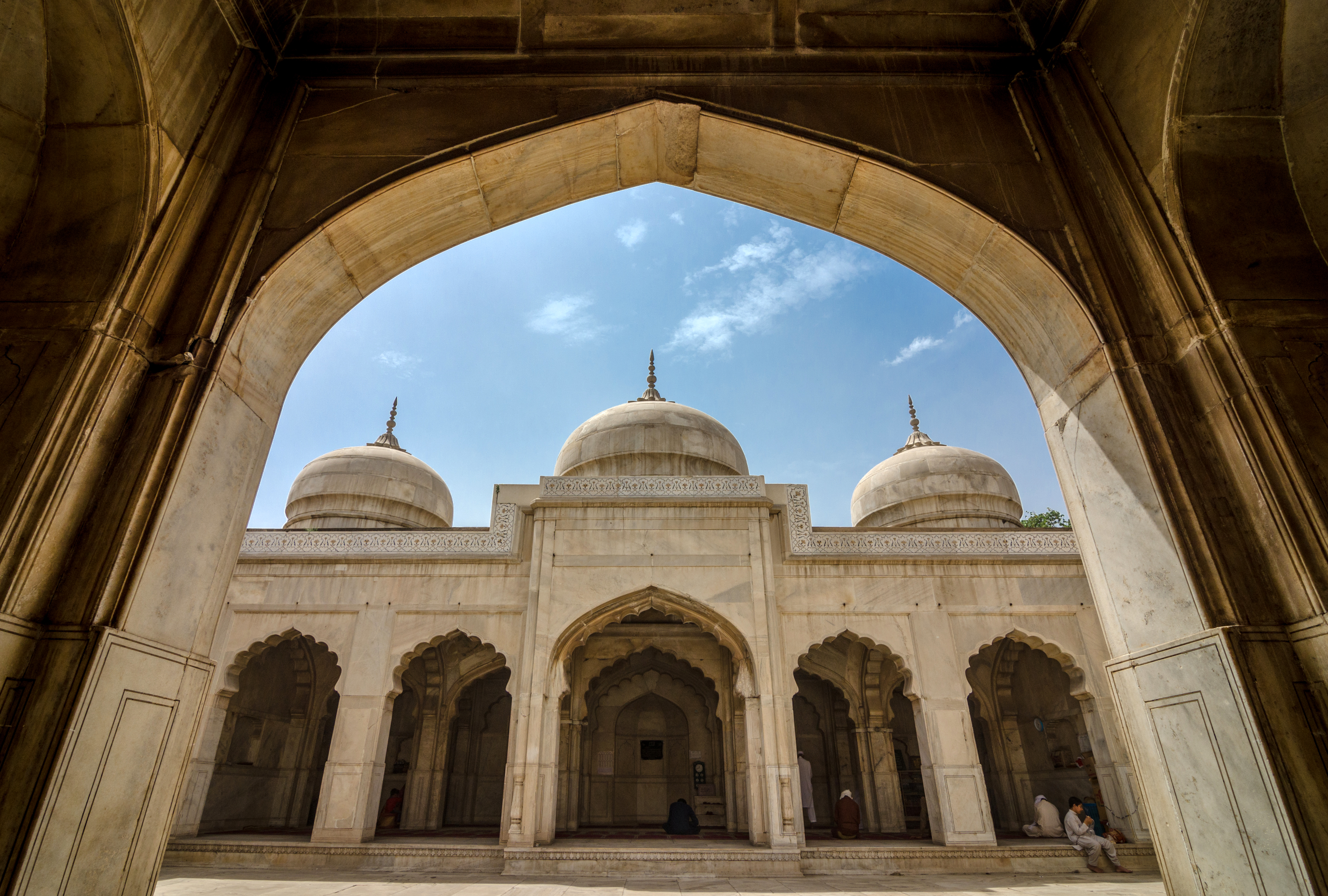
Moti Mosque

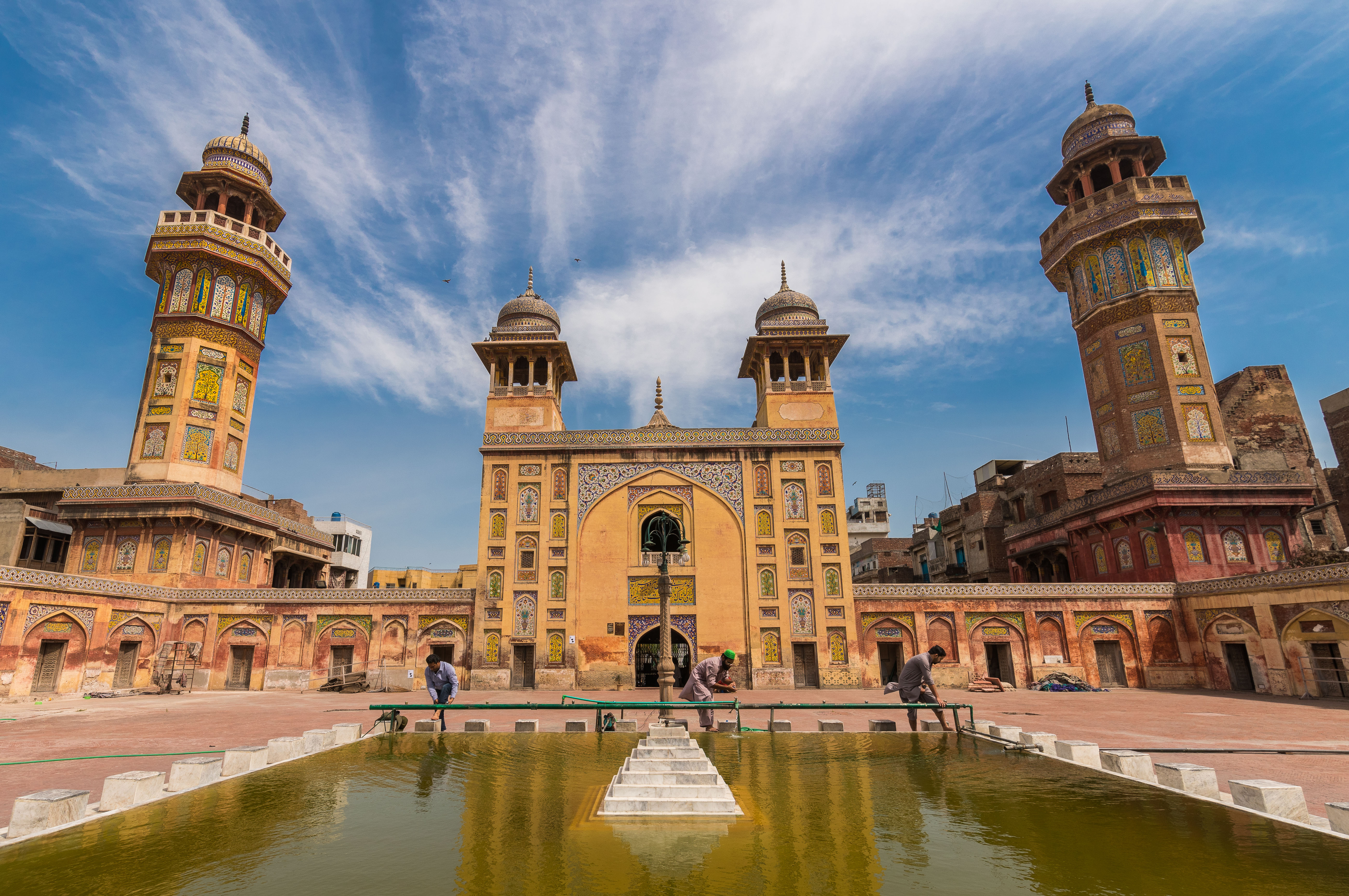
Wazir Khan Mosque

- Begum Shahi Mosque, 1614 CE
- Dai Anga Mosque, 1635 CE
- Moti Mosque, 1635 CE
- Wazir Khan Mosque, 1642 CE
- Saleh Kamboh Mosque, 1659 CE
- Badshahi Mosque, 1673 CE
- Sunehri Mosque, 1753 CE
- Shaheed Ganj Mosque, 1753 CE
- Oonchi Mosque

== 1900 CE – Present ==
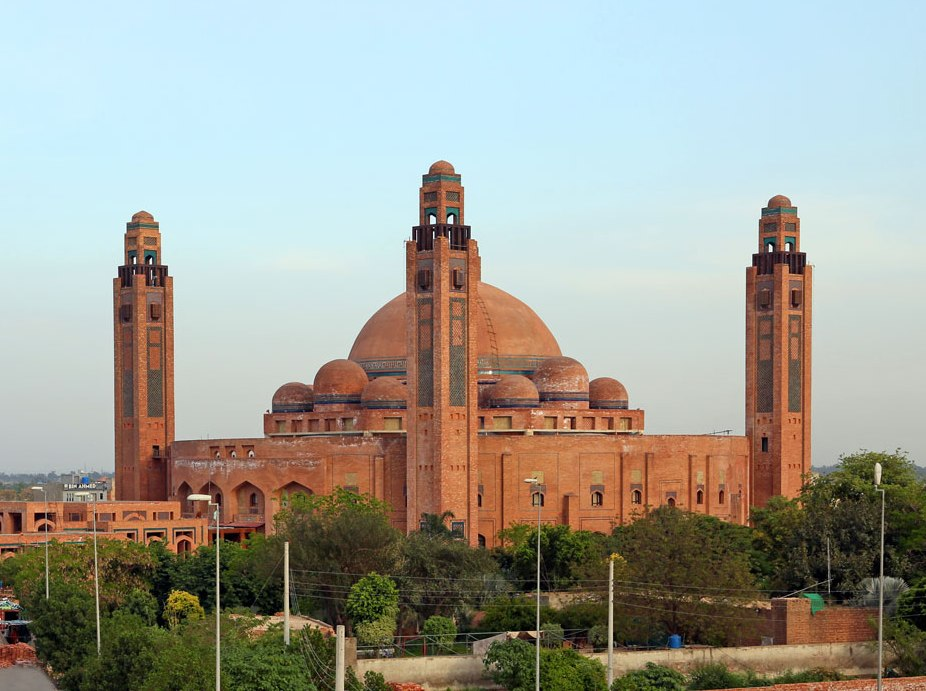
Grand Jamia Mosque

- Shab Bhar Mosque, 1917
- Jamia Hajveriah Mosque, 1978
- Grand Jamia Mosque, 2014
- Raiwand Mosque

== See also ==
- Temples in Lahore
