= Playart Phototone =

Film Studio

- Industry: Film distribution, production
- Founded: 1929
- Defunct: 1930s
- Headquarters: Lahore, British India
- Products: Films
- Owner: Abdur Rashid Kardar

Playart Phototone (formally known as United Players Association) was a film studio established in 1929 by Abdur Rashid Kardar.

== History ==
In 1928, with no work left after their maiden venture, Kardar and Ismail sold their belongings to set up a studio and production company under the name of United Players Corporation, the foundation stone for the film industry in Lahore. After scouting for locations, they settled for their offices to be established at Ravi Road. Although, the dim-lit area presented with much difficulties after the studios were established. Shootings were only possible in the day-light but nevertheless the area had some very important landmarks like the Ravi Forest and the tombs of Mughal emperor Jahangir and his wife Nur Jahan. It is reported that the team working at the studios would commute on tangas and even lost equipment once while travelling on the bumpy roads on the horse-drawn carriage. However basic and crude their working conditions, Kardar believed in his work and in 1930 he produced the first film under the studio's banner. With this film, Husn Ka Daku a.k.a. Mysterious Eagle, Kardar made his first directorial début. He also cast himself as an actor in the male lead opposite Gulzar Begum with Ismail in a supporting role. The film featured an American actor, Iris Crawford, as well. The film had mild success at theatres but prominently established Lahore as a functioning film industry. Kardar vowed on not acting in any other film and instead focusing on direction. Immediately afterwards the studio released the film Sarfarosh aka Brave Heart, with Gul Hamid playing the lead rold with more or less the same cast as in the previous film. This production proved equally appealing but was able to stir noise about this industry in film production circles throughout India. Roop Lal Shori, a resident of Brandreth Road in Lahore, upon hearing of a new film industry in the city, returned to his hometown. He later produced Kismet Ki Hera Pheri (Life After Death) which would firmly ground the new industry's reputation as being in line with other film industries of the time.

== Filmography ==
- Husn Ka Daku (1929)
- Sarfarosh (1931)
- Khooni Katar (1931)
- Kismet Ki Hera Pheri (1931)
- Heer Ranjha (1932)
- Raja Gopichand (1933)

== See also ==
- Lollywood, Pakistani film industry of Lahore
- Punjabi cinema, Punjabi-language film industry in India
- Cinema of India
- Cinema of Pakistan
