= Sarfarosh =

Sarfarosh may refer to:

- Sarfarosh (1930 film), an Indian silent film directed by A. R. Kardar
- Sarfarosh (1956 film), a Pakistani Urdu-language film directed by Anwar Kamal Pasha
- Sarfarosh (1985 film), an Indian Hindi-language action drama film directed by Dasari Narayana Rao
- Sarfarosh (1989 film), a Pakistani Punjabi-language action film directed by Iqbal Kashmiri
- Sarfarosh (1999 film), an Indian Hindi-language action thriller film directed by John Matthew Matthan
