= Hiralal (actor) =

Indian film actor

- Born: Hiralal Thakur; 14 March 1909 or 1910; Lahore, Punjab, British India (in present-day Pakistan)
- Died: 27 June 1981
- Other names: Hira Lal, Heeralal
- Occupation: Actor
- Years active: 1928–1981
- Spouse: Darparani (m. 1945)
- Children: 6, including Inder Thakur

Hiralal Thakur (14 March 1909/1910 – 27 June 1981), known mononymously as Hiralal, was an Indian actor known for his work in Hindi films. Known for his performances as a character actor, he was called the 'bad man of the Indian screen' for his portrayal of roles with negative shades. He made his debut with the silent film Safdar Jung (1930).

Hiralal also took part in India's independence movement and became an activist with the Indian National Congress when he was 14. He was later associated with the group of political and social workers that included Lala Lajpat Rai and Bhagat Singh, before moving into a career in films in 1928. After a distinguished career in films for over fifty years which included at least 150 films, he died penniless in 1981.

== Career ==
Hiralal took to acting in films "as a hobby" after being asked by filmmaker Abdur Rashid Kardar, who was making Safdar Jung in Lahore, to play the role of a Pathan. Filming of Safdar Jung had begun in 1924 and Hiralal joined in 1929. He then appeared in another silent film, Daughters of Today, which saw theatrical release first. Hiralal recalled having a "thirst for authenticity" early on in his career, citing an example of him going bald to play a "one-eyed bald-headed man" in his next film, the 1931 film Awara Raqasa ("Wandering Dancer"), also directed by Kardar. He switched to sound films, later making his debut with Pavitra Ganga (1932) in which he played a "mad monk" as one character. He appeared in dual roles in the film, both as the protagonist and antagonist, opposite Nalini Tarkhad. His performance in Din-o-Duniya (1936) as General Mohammad Tariq received praise.

Hiralal then moved to Calcutta (now Kolkata) and became associated with the New Theatres film studio. It was here under the "able guidance" of filmmaker Hemachandra Chunder that he felt he had become "a real actor". He appeared in Mera Punjab (1940), an adaptation of Pearl S. Buck's The Good Earth, in which he played three stages of a man's life: "the young man, the father and the grandfather". He then appeared in Sipahi (1941), playing "a soldier who fights for his country (in World War I) and then under the economic depression that follows is unable to find a job. On the verge of starvation, he becomes a gangster and at the end is shot in an encounter with his pursuers." He called the final sequence in the film in which the soldier-turned-gangster is cornered by six or seven men and is shot "the most moving scene" he had ever played. Hiralal recollected in an interview in the 1960s that it was with his role in Faisla (1947) opposite Kanan Devi that he was "able to form a certain concept of villainy which served me well later when I began to play the villain in most of my pictures." In Chunder's Teen Bhai (1955), he "played a villain" opposite Pahari Sanyal, Nazir Hussain and Bharat Bhushan's characters. Hiralal's association with the New Theatres, however, ended in 1949, when he moved to Bombay (now Mumbai).

In Bombay, his first film Badal (1951), in which he played a " villainous sardar whose greed for money is his undoing", was received well. In Kishore Sahu's Sapna (1952), he played an outlaw who kidnaps the heroine played by Bina Rai. In K. Amarnath's Mehbooba (1954), he played a dacoit. In G. P. Sippy's Chandrakanta (1956), he played "a mad conqueror who wanted his people to worship him as a living God." Hiralal studied the lives of Nero and a few Egyptian Pharaohs in preparation for the role. He starred in Leader (1964) as a "fanatic killer who is out to exterminate a famous man."

Hiralal rated his performance in the 1948 film Jhoothi Kasmein his best, during an interview with the Indian Express in 1965. He added that Swayamsiddha (1947) and Anjangarh (1948) were films that gave him "inspiration and strength". Hiralal credited filmmakers Birendranath Sircar and Hemachandra Chunder for having taught him to become a character actor, Roop K. Shorey for the "laugh" and "weep without sobbing" in films. He recalled Amarnath "built him up as a fighter" with his film Sarkar (1951). Hiralal was a fan of American actors John Barrymore and Paul Muni.

== Personal life ==
Hiralal was born into a Punjabi family on 14 March 1909 (or 1910) in Lahore, then a city in the Punjab Province of British India (in present-day Pakistan). He was two children . anuradha and harish Hiralal completed his education in Lahore and grew up watching and being influenced by the character of Ravana in the Ramlila plays.

Hiralal married Darparani in 1945 and had five sons and a daughter with her. The sons were Krishna, Kamal, Prem, Ajay, and Inder, the last of whom was an actor and model, and died in the Air India Flight 182 bombing in 1985. Apart from his mother tongue Punjabi, Hiralal could speak fluently in Hindi, Urdu and English.

== Filmography ==
- Daughters of Today (1928)
- Safdar Jung (1930)
- Awara Raqasa (1931)
- Pavitra Ganga (1932)
- Seeta (1934)
- Suhag Ka Daan (1936)
- Mera Punjab (1940; Punjabi film)
- Meri Bahen (1944)
- Arabian Nights (1946 film) (1946)
- Faisla (1947)
- Swayamsiddha (1947)
- Jhoothi Kasmein (1948)
- Anjangarh (1948)
- Badal (1951)... Jai Singh
- Sarkar (1951)
- Aaram (1951)... Bhagwan
- Sapna (1952)
- Do Bigha Zamin (1953)
- Raj Ratan (1953)... Raj Guru's lieutenant
- Mehbooba (1954)
- Hamlet... King Claudius
- Nagin (1954)
- Danka (1954)
- Teen Bhai (1955)
- Riyasat (1955)
- Babasa Ri Laadi (1961; Rajasthani film)
- Bandini (1963)
- Sapni (1963; Punjabi film)
- Leader (1964)... Kargah
- Nishan (1965)
- Nayak (1966)... Kamal Misra
- Kismat (1968)
- Loafer (1973)... Singh's agent
- Hamrahi (1974)
- Kabeela (1976)
- Mr. Natwarlal (1979)
- Insaaf Ka Tarazu (1980)
- Kaalia (1981)
