= Tamancha Jan =

Pakistani singer (1918–2008)

- تمانچا جان
- Born: Gulzar Begum; 10 July 1918; Lahore, British India
- Died: 20 October 2008 (aged 90); Lahore, Pakistan
- Other names: The Singing Siren; The Nightingale of Lahore
- Occupations: Singer; Playback singer; Actress; Folk singer; Film director
- Years active: 1929 – 1990
- Children: 4
- Parent: Sadar Begum (mother)

Gulzar Begum, also known as Tamancha Jan (Urdu: تمانچا جان; born 1918) was a Pakistani folk singer. She was known as The Singing Siren and The Nightingale of Lahore. She was a popular playback singer of the 1930s and 1940s in the Indian cinema.

== Early life ==
Gulzar was born in 1918 in a family of musicians in Heera Mandi at Lahore, British India. She was the daughter of Sardar Begum, a famous singer of her time. She started learning ghazal singing at the age of seven and was trained by Ustad Fida Hussain. Later she changed her name from Gulzar to Tamancha Jan after several years of training in music. She opened her own music salon and would play riyaz but would also practice her music lessons.

Gulzar's older brother Umar Hayat was a Chaudhary of Bazaar Heera Mandi during the 1940s. In the 1930s Ghulam Haider was looking for new singers and he was fascinated by Punjabi folk songs then he heard about Tamancha Jan and he was impressed by her fame so he invited her for an audition at Radio Lahore Station which she accepted. After she auditioned he liked her deep voice so she recorded her first microphone song and was credited as Miss Tamancha Jan.

== Career ==
In 1929, she made her debut as a child actress in Abdur Rashid Kardar's silent film Husn Ka Daku (1929) as Gulzar also called Mysterious Eagle which was the first production of United Players Corporation and later in 1931 she acted again in A. R. Kardar's film Khooni Katar also called Golden Dagger.

In 1935 she did her first playback singing in the Punjabi film Shela Alias Pind Di Kurri and she sang the song Jagga Jamimiya Tay Milan which was a hit song played frequently in Punjab. She also sang the song Lung a Jaa Patan Chanahn which was originally sung by Noor Jehan in the film Shela Alias Pind Di Kurri but it was not released on gramophone record. She used to work for Jenophone Records then she also worked for some other companies including Columbia at Anarkali in Lahore and she also used to sing ghazals at Radio Lahore.

In 1937 she along with Shamshad Begum, Zeenat Begum, Umrao Zia Begum and Surinder Kaur sang a song on Radio Lahore on 16 December which was written in a text story by Kartar Singh Duggal. In the 1930s she regularly performed songs on at All India Radio.

Then the following year she worked for Dalsukh M. Pancholi and the studios released its first Punjabi film it was written by Wali Sahib which was directed by Barkat Mehra and produced by Dalsukh M. Pancholi. The film's music was composed by Ghulam Haider and she sang the song Ghook Meri Qismat So Geyi Zaroor Oye. The film was shown at Lahore's Upper Mall. The film was a super hit at the box office and her song became popular.

In 1942 Dalsukh M. Pancholi studios released Urdu film Khandan she recorded the popular song Tu Kon Si Badli Mein Meray Chand Hay which was originally sung by Noor Jehan which was released on gramophone but it became so popular and then her song was added to the film by the producers.

In 1943 film director Nazir was looking for a new actress for his film Heer Ranjha so he asked her to act in his film which was producing but she refused although she told him that she will sing songs in his film which he accepted then he cast Swaran Lata for the role of Heer later the film was delayed but was released in late 1943.

During the 1940s she was a famous singer known as The Nightingale of Lahore. She would sing ghazals and folk songs on radio and at concerts.

Gulzar moved to Pakistan after the partition of India and she continued to sing at her salon and some functions also on Radio Pakistan. In 1950 she closed her salon and retired from singing then she went to live with one of her daughters at Model Town.

In 1980s she worked as a film director and directed both Urdu and Punjabi films. In 1981 she and Pervez Kaleen co-directed Punjabi film Billu Sher which starred Yousuf Khan, Musarrat Shaheen, Afzaal Ahmad, Adeeb and Bahar Begum. In 1986 she directed Punjabi film Qasai Puttar which starred Naghma, Musarrat Shaheen, Kaifee, Adeeb, Abid Kashmiri and Chakori.

In 1997 she met Pran, an old friend and admirer of hers, so she gave him a detailed interview to Pran Nevile who was a fan of hers and used to visit her during his younger years. He later wrote about her in his books Nautch Girls of India and Lahore: A Sentimental Journey.

== Personal life ==
Gulzar was married and she had four children.

== Death ==
Tamancha died at her home in Lahore on 20 October 2008.

== Filmography ==
=== Film ===
Year	Film	Language
1929	Husn Ka Daku	Hindi
1931	Khooni Katar	Hindi
1935	Sheila Alias Pind Di Kudi	Punjabi
1939	Gul Bakavli	Punjabi
1942	Khandan	Urdu
1981	Billu Sher	Punjabi
1986	Qasai Puttar	Punjabi
