= Heer Ranjha (1932 film) =

1932 film

- Directed by: Abdul Rashid Kardar
- Based on: Folklore of Heer Ranjha love story and the 18th century epic poem by Waris Shah
- Produced by: Hakeem Ram Parshad
- Starring: Anwari Begum; Rafiq Ghaznavi; M. Ismail; Walait Begum; Gul Hamid; Lala Yaqoob; Fazal Shah
- Music by: Rafiq Ghaznavi
- Production company: Playart Phototone
- Release date: 1932
- Country: British India
- Language: Punjabi

Heer Ranjha is a 1932 Punjabi feature film, the first movie directed by A.R. Kardar, starring Anwari Begum and Rafiq Ghaznavi in the title roles.

It is based on the love story of Heer Ranjha and the 18th-century Punjabi Sufi poet Waris Shah's epic poem narrating their saga. Rafiq Ghaznavi also composed the music for the film.

== Production ==
Heer Ranjha was the first talkie to be created in Punjab; it was produced by Hakim Ram Prasad and the Playart Photophone Company (formerly known as United Players Corporation, founded by Kardar). The film was censored by the Punjab Board.
