= Shab Bhar Mosque =

Mosque in Lahore, Punjab, Pakistan

- شب بهر مسجد
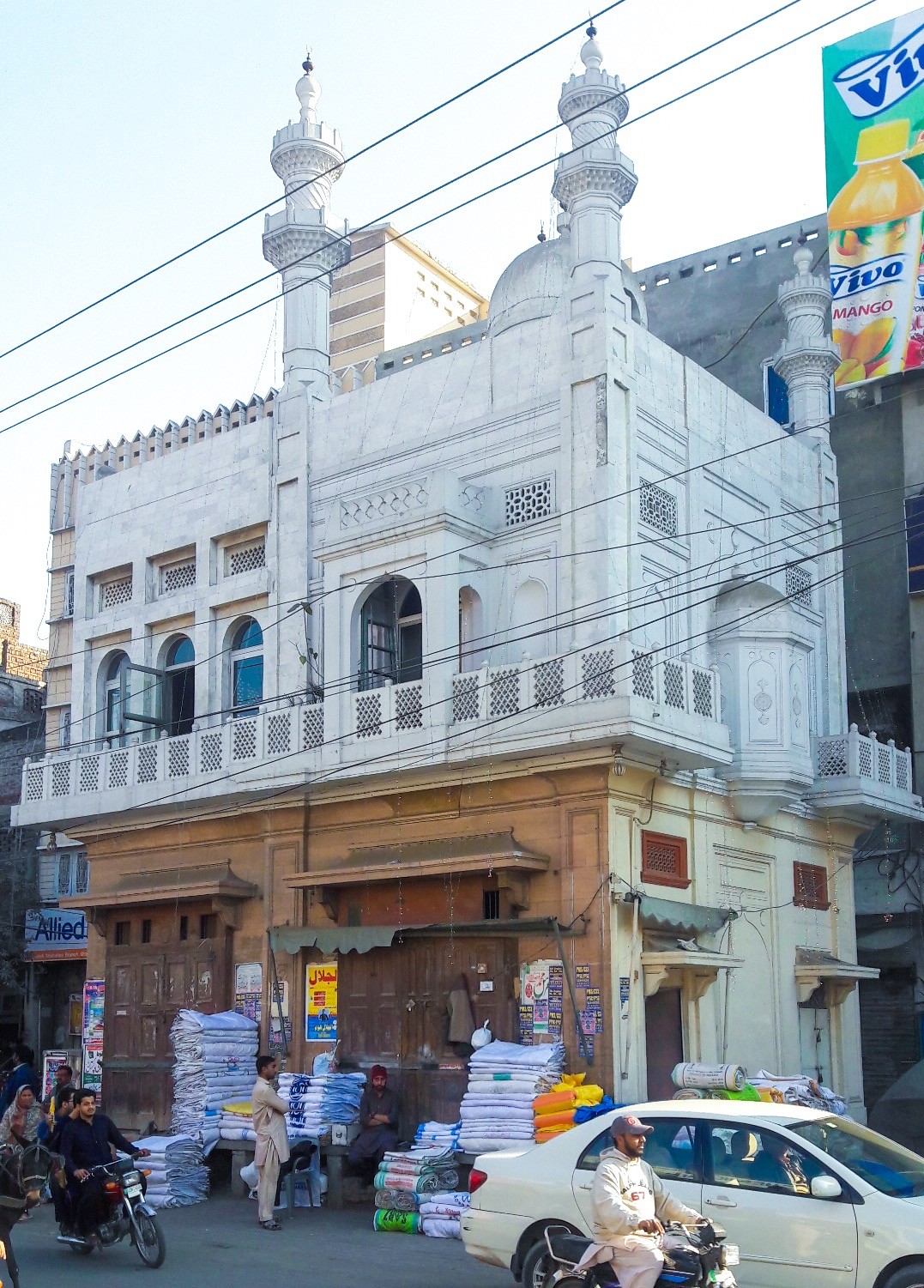
- The mosque is said to have been built in one night following a dispute between local Hindus and Muslims

Religion
- Affiliation: Islam

Location
- Location: Lahore, Punjab, Pakistan
- Interactive map of Shab Bhar Mosque
- Coordinates: 31°34′31″N 74°19′03″E

Architecture
- Type: mosque
- Style: Indo-Islamic, Mughal
- Completed: 1917 C.E.

Specifications
- Dome: 1
- Minaret: 4
- Materials: brick, marble

The Shab Bhar Mosque (Urdu: شب بهر مسجد; meaning "Overnight mosque") is a colonial era mosque in the Shah Alami neighbourhood of Lahore, Pakistan. The mosque is said to have been built overnight, following a dispute between local Hindus and Muslims in 1917.

== History ==
The mosque was built in 1917 following a dispute between local Hindus and Muslims regarding ownership of a 3 marla site after a Muslim had offered prayer on the vacant site, upsetting local Hindus. Both communities then expressed a wish to build their house of worship there. The matter was submitted to British colonial authorities, who decided to dispatch a judge to the site in order to determine to which community the disputed plot would belong. A Muslim lawyer advised his community to build a mosque at the site before the judge arrived, so that ownership of the site would be declared in their favour as British authorities had pledged not to disturb religious sites. Under the leadership of a local wrestler named Gama Pehalwan, Muslim volunteers are said to have gathered after the evening Isha prayer, in order to build the mosque. The mosque reportedly was complete by the morning Fajr prayer, and the judge then ruled in favour of the Muslim community.

== Gallery ==
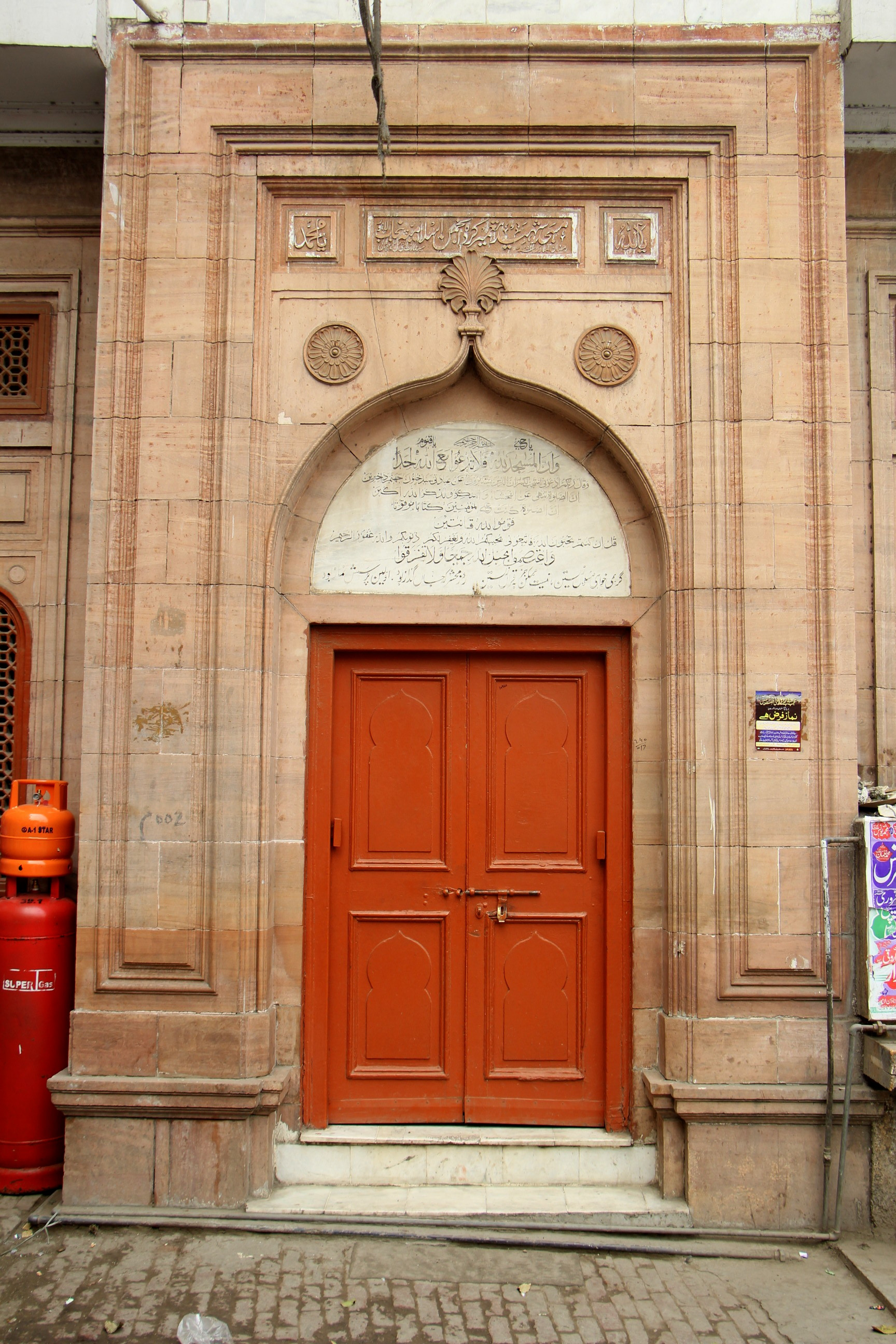
Entryway to the mosque

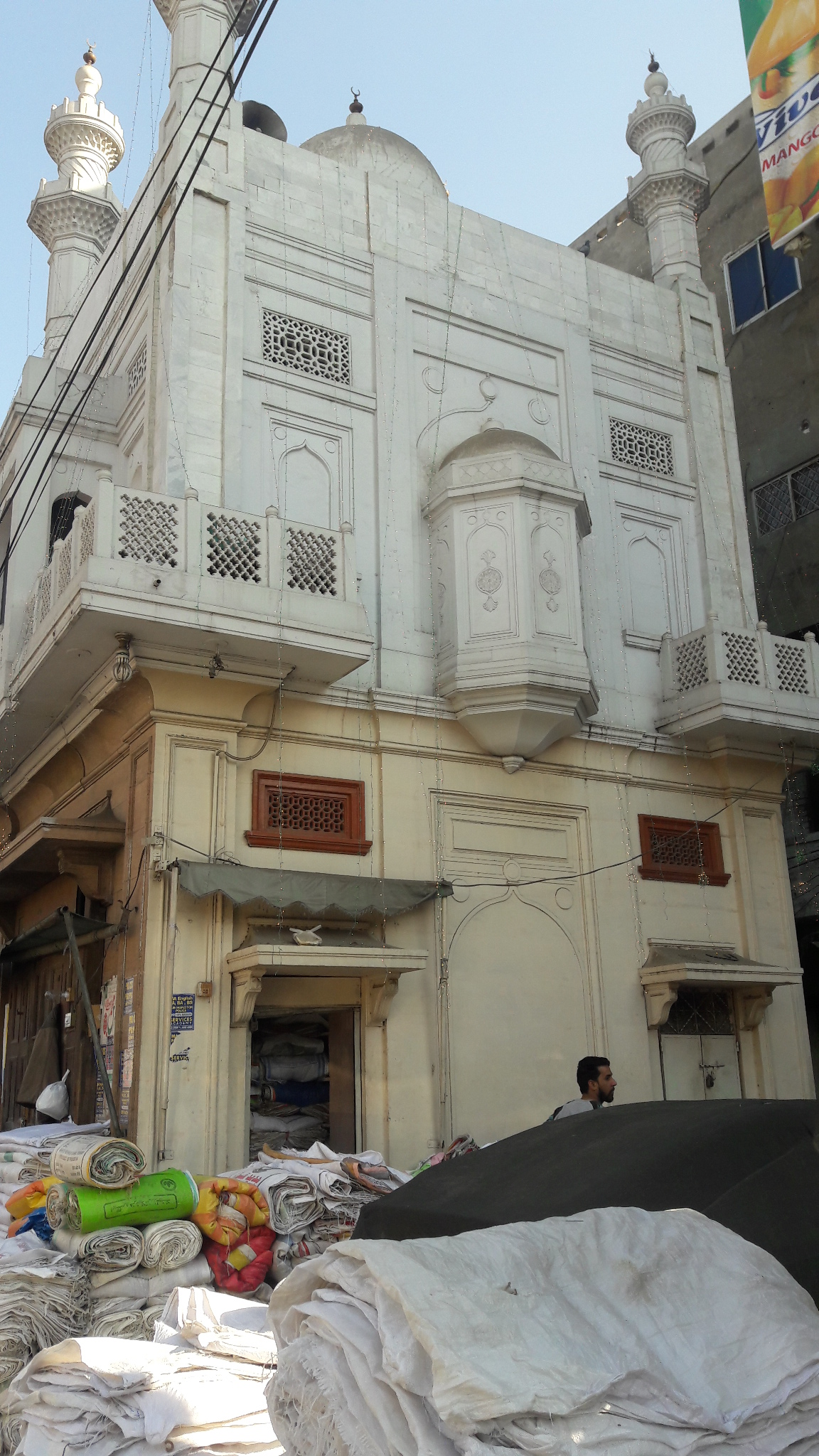
A view of the side façade

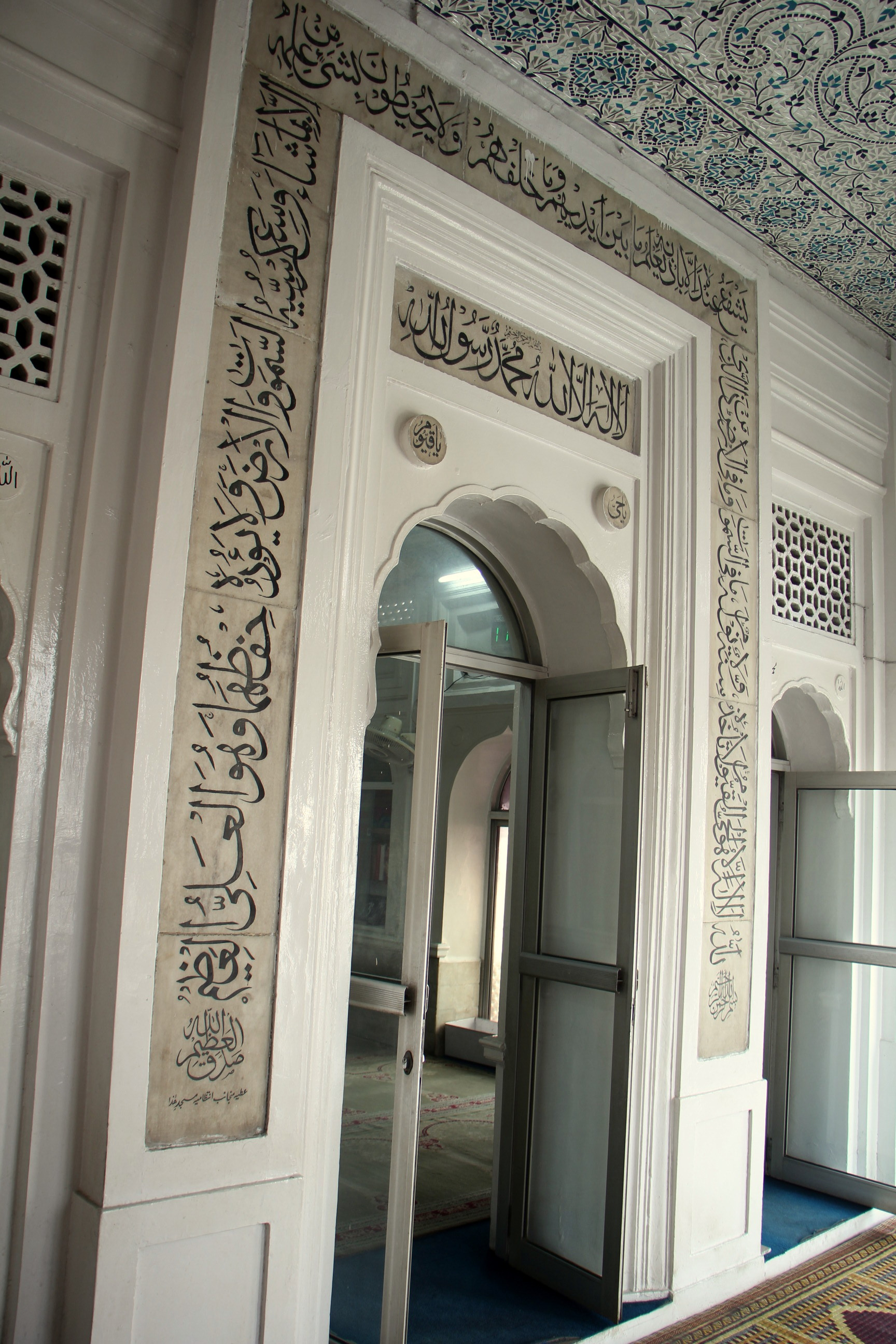
Entrance into the prayer chamber

== See also ==
- List of mosques in Lahore
