= Mera Punjab =

Mera Punjab 1940
- Directed by: Krishna Dev Mehra
- Starring: Hiralal, Prem Kamari, Madhavi, Canpat Premi
- Distributed by: Movie Marvel
- Release date: 27 December 1940
- Country: India
- Language: Punjabi

Mera Punjab is a 1940 Indian film directed by Krishna Dev Mehra. It stars Haider Bandi.
