= Oonchi Mosque =

Mosque in Lahore, Punjab, Pakistan

- اونچی مسجد
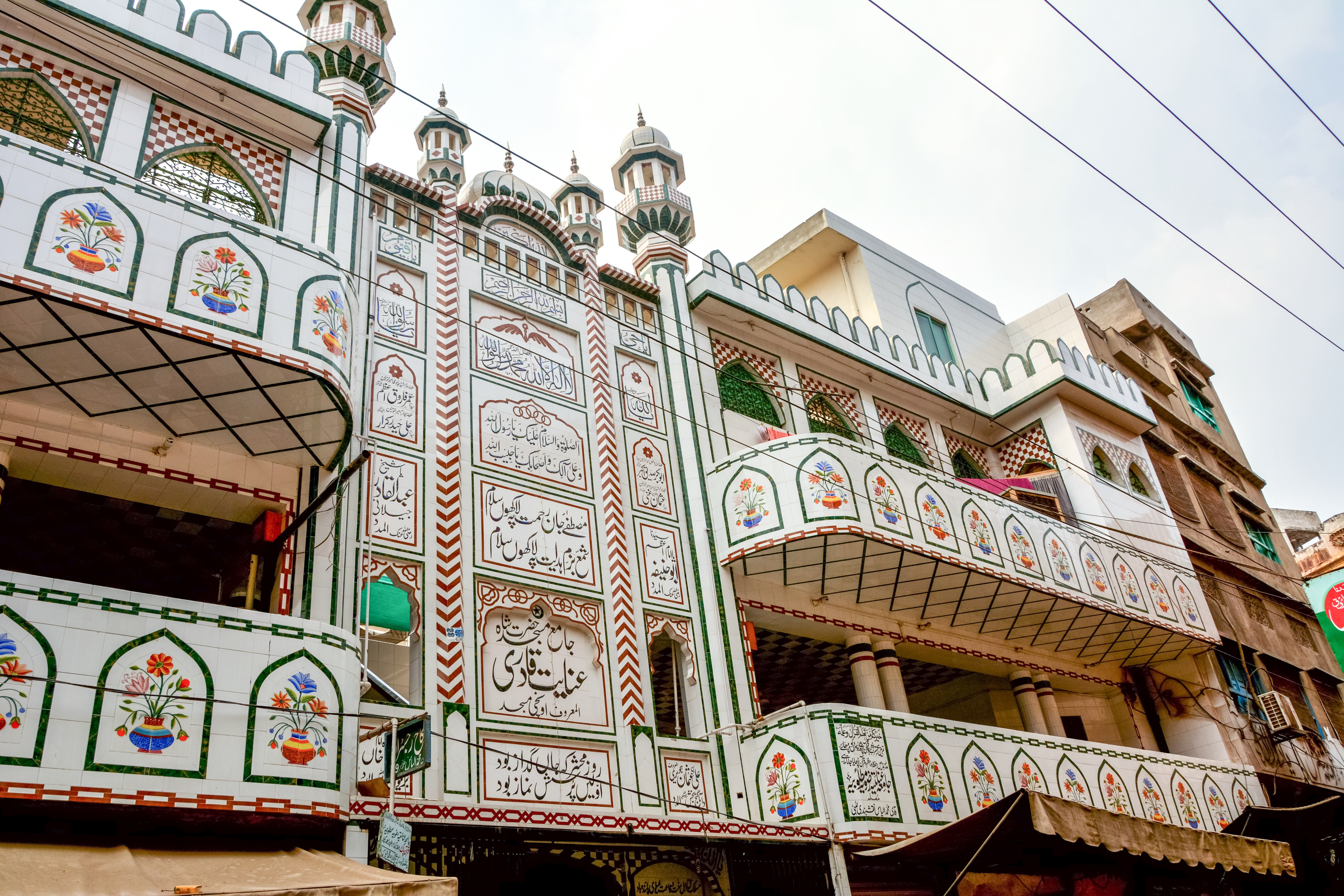

Religion
- Affiliation: Sunni Islam
- District: Lahore
- Province: Punjab

Location
- Country: Pakistan

Architecture
- Type: Mosque
- Style: Indo-Islamic/Mughal

The Oonchi Mosque, or Uchi Mosque (Punjabi: اُچی مسیت, Urdu: اونچی مسجد, lit. 'High Mosque') is a Mughal-era mosque located along the Hakiman Bazaar, near the Bhati Gate which leads into the Walled City of Lahore, in Pakistan. The mosque may date from the reign of the Mughal Emperor Akbar.

It has been extensively renovated throughout its history, resulting in little of the mosque's original decorative elements being preserved.

== Background ==
The mosque's name means "Elevated Mosque," and refers to the fact that the mosque was built upon a high platform. Unlike the grand Mughal mosques such as Wazir Khan Mosque and Badshahi Mosque, no inscription exists which signifies the year of the mosque's construction.

== History ==
The mosque is often said to date from the reign of Akbar; however, evidence also suggests that the mosque may have been built later, during the reign of Aurangzeb.

It is said that the spiritual master of the great Punjabi poet and Sufi saint, Baba Bulleh Shah, Shah Inayat Qadiri, was Imam of the mosque. Mulla Abdul Qadir Badayuni mentions in his writing the mosque as a platform during the reign of Akbar.

The mosque has been ascribed to a mashki - a water carrier. A tughra was once located on the mosque's outer gate which read:

What a fine new doorway of the mosque is this! Before whose arch everybody bows his head! When it was built the architect of reason said, This is the gate to the eternal Paradise.

== Architecture ==
The mosque features three archways and a small ablution pool for the performance of the Islamic ritual washing called 'Wudu' before prayers. Two niches along the mosque's western wall bear Quranic verses, while a third bears the name of Abul Fateh Jalal-ud-Din Muhammad Akbar Badshah Ghazi, simply known as the emperor Akbar.

== See also ==
- Mosques of Lahore
- Mughal architecture
