= Raywand Mosque =

Mosque in Lahore, Punjab, Pakistan

Religion
- Affiliation: Islam

Location
- Location: Raiwind
- Municipality: Lahore
- State: Punjab
- Country: Pakistan

Architecture
- Type: mosque

The Raiwind Mosque is a prominent Mosque in Raiwand, in Lahore District, Pakistan, associated with the charity Tablighi Jamaat. The Tablighi movement holds a large annual festival in Raywand.

== Intelligence analysts suspicions ==
A number of Guantanamo captives had their continued detention justified, in part, due to allegations that they stayed at, or visited the Raywand Mosque. Two German muslims were apprehended by Pakistani authorities after staying that the Raywand Mosque in 2007. Some of the Summary of Evidence memos listing allegations against the Guantanamo captives added an explanation for why the stay in the Raywand Mosque, and the association with the Taglighi movement generated suspicion. The memos asserted that the religious pilgrimages Taglighi followers engaged in had been known to have been used as innocuous cover stories by some Islamic militants and terrorists, for their travels.

== Links with Terrorists ==
The BBC quoted Rana Sanaullah, a provincial minister that the terrorists had stayed in Raiwind at a location from where groups make sorties for Tabligh (preaching) to spread the message of Allah; their handlers took them from there to the targeted locations. Raiwind was named as the town where the terrorists stayed for many days. These terrorists attacked on Ahmadiyya Mosques in Lahore on 28 May 2010.

== See also ==
- Islam in Pakistan
