= Farebi Shahzada =

1931 film

- Directed by: A. R. Kardar
- Produced by: United Players Corporation
- Starring: Gul Hamid; Gulzar; Hiralal; M. Ismail
- Cinematography: K. V. Machve
- Production company: Playart Phototone/United Player's Corporation
- Release date: 1931
- Country: British India
- Language: Silent film

Farebi Shahzada, also called The Shepherd, is a 1931 Indian action silent film directed by A. R. Kardar. The film was also known as Gudaria Sultan or The Shepherd King and was the fourth of seven films Kardar produced under Kardar's United Players Corporation, Lahore.

The film starred Gul Hamid, Gulzar and M. Ismail with Hiralal. The other actors in the cast included Hassan Din, Ahmed Din, Haider Shah and Fazal Shah. Farebi Shahzada, like Kardar's earlier films was also released at The Deepak cinema in Bhati Gate area of Lahore.

== Cast ==
- Gulzar
- M. Ismail
- Hiralal
- Hassan Din
- Haider Shah
- Fazal Shah
- Ahmed Din
