= Data Darbar =

Sufi Islamic shrine in Lahore, Pakistan

- داتا دربار
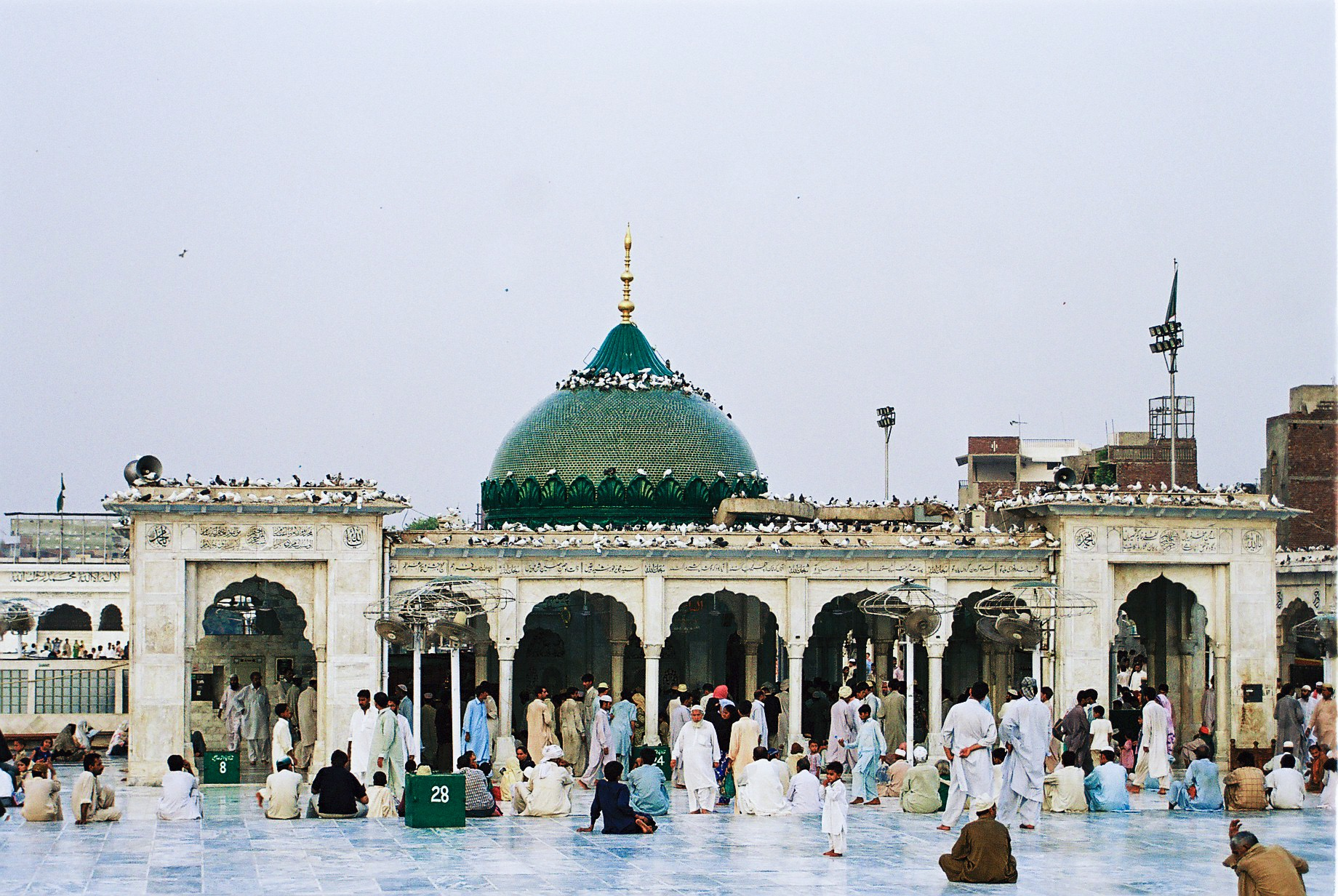
- The shrine of Ali Hujwiri is one of Pakistan's most important Sufi shrines

Religion
- Affiliation: Sufi Islam
- Province: Punjab

Location
- Location: Lahore
- Country: Pakistan
- Interactive map of Data Darbar
- Coordinates: 31.57898°N 74.30474°E

Architecture
- Type: Mosque and Sufi mausoleum
- Style: Modern

Specifications
- Dome: 1
- Minaret: 4

Data Darbar (Punjabi: داتا دربار, romanized: Dātā Darbār) is an Islamic shrine located in Lahore, Punjab, Pakistan. It is the largest Sufi shrine in South Asia and was built to house the remains of Ali al-Hujwiri, also known as Data Ganj Baksh or more colloquially as Data Sahab, a Sufi saint who came from Ghazni to Lahore in the 11th century CE, during the Ghaznavid period.

The site is considered to be the most sacred place in Lahore, and attracts up to one million visitors to its annual Urs festival.

== Location ==
Data Darbar is located in the center of Walled City of Lahore. Surrounding it are Lower Mall Road, Bhati Gate, and Gawalmandi.

== History ==
The shrine was originally a simple grave next to the mosque which Ali Hujwiri had built on the outskirts of Lahore in the 11th century. By the 13th century, the belief that the spiritual powers of great Sufi saints were attached to their burial sites was widespread in the Muslim world, and so a larger shrine was built to commemorate the burial site of Hujwiri during the Mughal period. The shrine complex was expanded in the 19th century, and Hujwiri's mosque was rebuilt. However, some historians claim that the present shrine does not house the grave of Ali Hujwiri. According to that theory, this place was a site where he used to come for worship, and his actual grave is hidden in Lahore Fort.

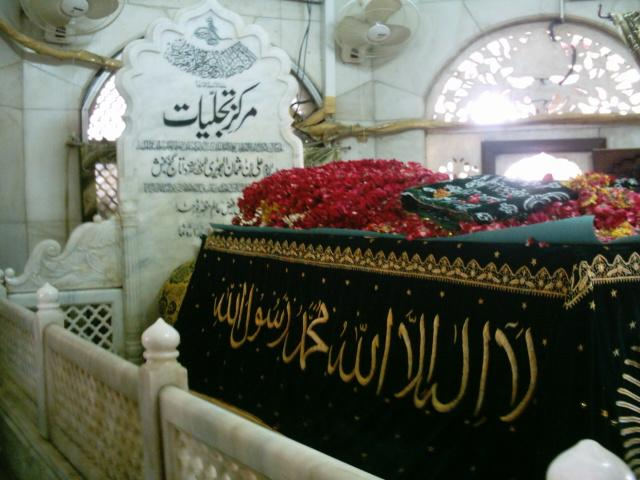
The shrine houses the tomb of the 11th-century Sufi saint, Ali Hujwiri.

The shrine came under Pakistani government control as part of the Auquf Ordinance of 1960, with the official aim of preventing shrine caretakers throughout the country from financially exploiting devotees. The shrine was greatly expanded in the 1980s under the rule of military leader Zia-ul-Haq, during which it became the largest in South Asia. Offices for NGOs, a library, madrasa, police station, carpark, and offices were all added under his regime. Designated spaces for musical performances, and new free kitchen were also added during that time. New markets have emerged around the site since its massive expansion.

Since 1965, the mehfil-e-sama, a 2-day qawwali music festival, had been held adjacent to the shrine, which in 1992 shifted to a nearby school.

=== Terror attacks ===
On 1 July 2010, two suicide bombers attacked the shrine. At least 50 people were killed, and 200 others were injured in the blasts. On 8 May 2019, another blast at the same site killed twelve people.

== Architecture ==
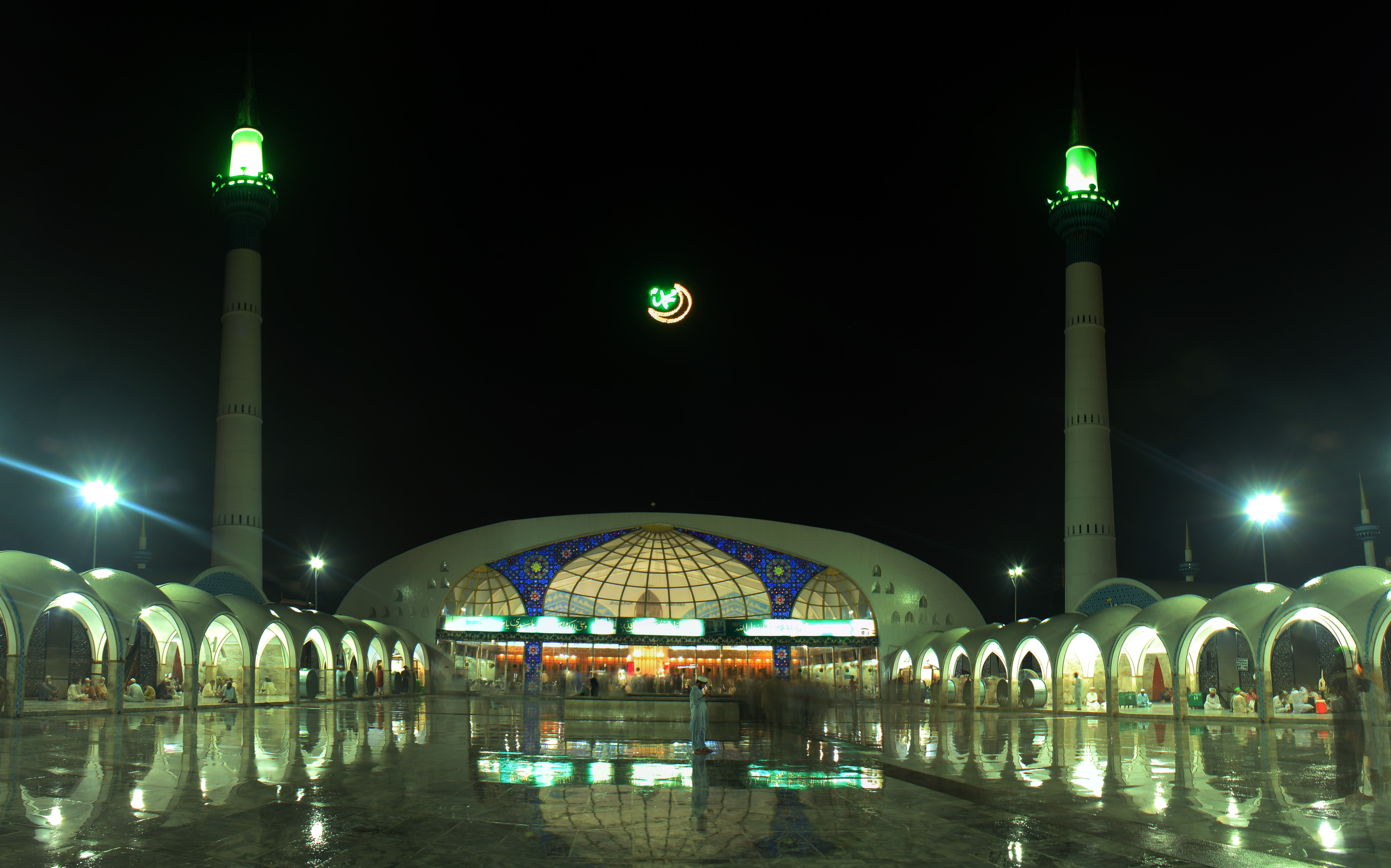
The shrine's mosque was rebuilt in the 1980s utilizing a modernist architectural style.

The shrine of Hujwiri is housed in a Mughal era tomb crafted of carved white marble. The tomb is surrounded by a massive marble courtyard, while a new educational institution at the shrine complex utilizes modernist architecture.

== Significance ==
The site is considered to be the most sacred place in Lahore. The shrine has emerged a major economic, political, and social centre in Lahore, and is one of the only places in Lahore where the rich and poor share space together.

It is widely believed among devotees that the saint interred at the shrine is the supreme authority over all Sufi saints in the Indian subcontinent, and that no new Sufi saint could immigrate to the subcontinent without obtaining permission from the spirit of Hujwiri.

Following the establishment of a shrine dedicated to Hujwiri, his tomb was visited by Muslims and non-Muslims in search of his blessings. Illustrious figures such as Baba Farid, Mu'in al-Din Chishti, Nizamuddin Auliya, Dara Shikoh, and Allama Iqbal all paid obeisance to the shrine, and pledged allegiance to Hujwiri. Former Prime Minister Nawaz Sharif was a frequent visitor to the shrine.

Hujwiri's teachings were critical of practices associated with South Asian Islam, such as the use of drugs, and dancing. He also taught that Sufi saints were themselves still obliged to the demands of Islam, and so is revered by reformist Muslims who are critical of Sufi practice, as well as traditionalist Muslims who revere Sufi shrines.

Qawwali performances are regularly held at the shrine. On special occasions, the shrine is decorated with lights, dinner is prepared for thousands of visitors, who also partake in dance while musicians play Sufi music for hours. At the boundary of the shrine, Muslim faithfuls recite the Qur'an, and pay tributes to the Prophet Muhammad.

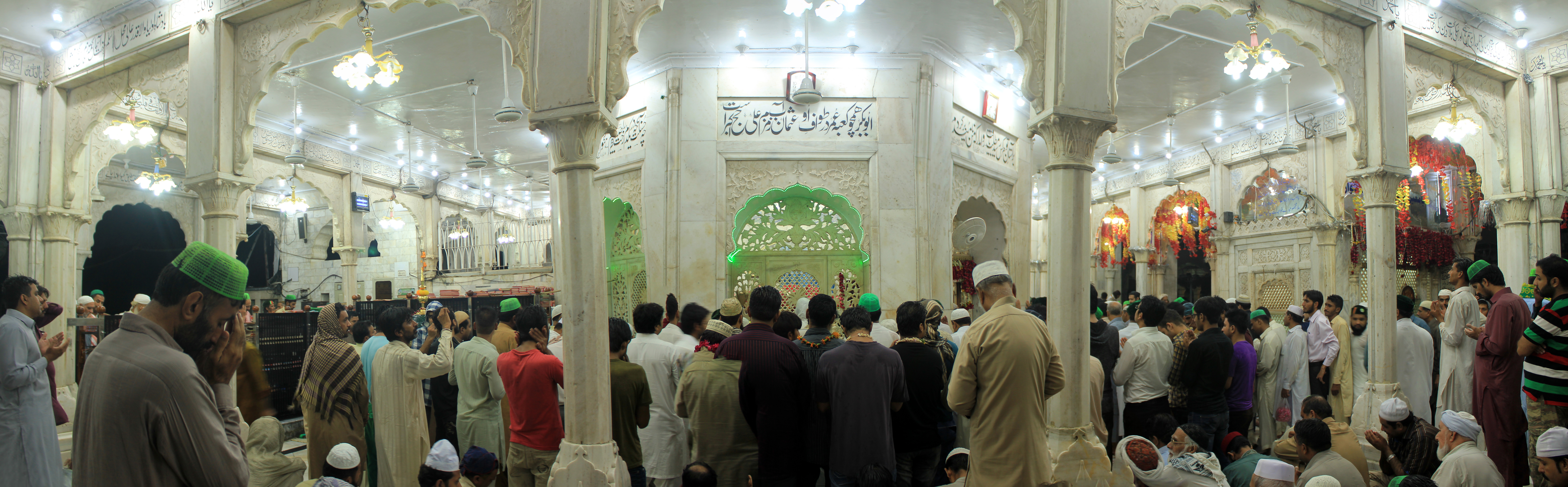
The shrine attracts thousands of devotees on a daily basis.

=== Social services ===
The shrine provides a wide array of social services which have made it a popular hub for impoverished residents. In a custom that is 1,000 years old, up to 50,000 visitors per day are offered free food at the shrine. Patrons facing personal difficulties frequently donate money or labour to the shrine's free-kitchen fund, in line with Islam's emphasis on feeding the poor. The shrine also provides for students' education in nearby schools, and helps fund local hospitals as part of its social mission.

== Access ==
The shrine remains open at all hours, and welcomes visitors who freely enter the complex. The shrine is visited by approximately 30,000 to 60,000 visitors on a daily basis, though the number can double on religious holidays, and on Thursdays - the traditional night for visiting shrines. Approximately 1,000,000 devotees visit the shrine during its annual urs festival.

The shrine is served by the Bhatti Chowk station of the Lahore Metrobus.

== Administration ==
The shrine is managed as part of an Auqaf foundation as part of the Auqaf Ordinance of 1960. The shrine is managed by approximately 200 full-time workers, excluding security services. The shrine produces the most revenue for the Auqaf board out of all the some 400 shrines under its control in Punjab province, and contributes approximately 33% of the board's revenue. The shrine collects 4 times more income than is spent on the shrine's upkeep. Considered to be the centre of all shrines in Punjab, religious practices and sermons are subject to more government regulation than at other shrines in Pakistan.

== Gallery ==
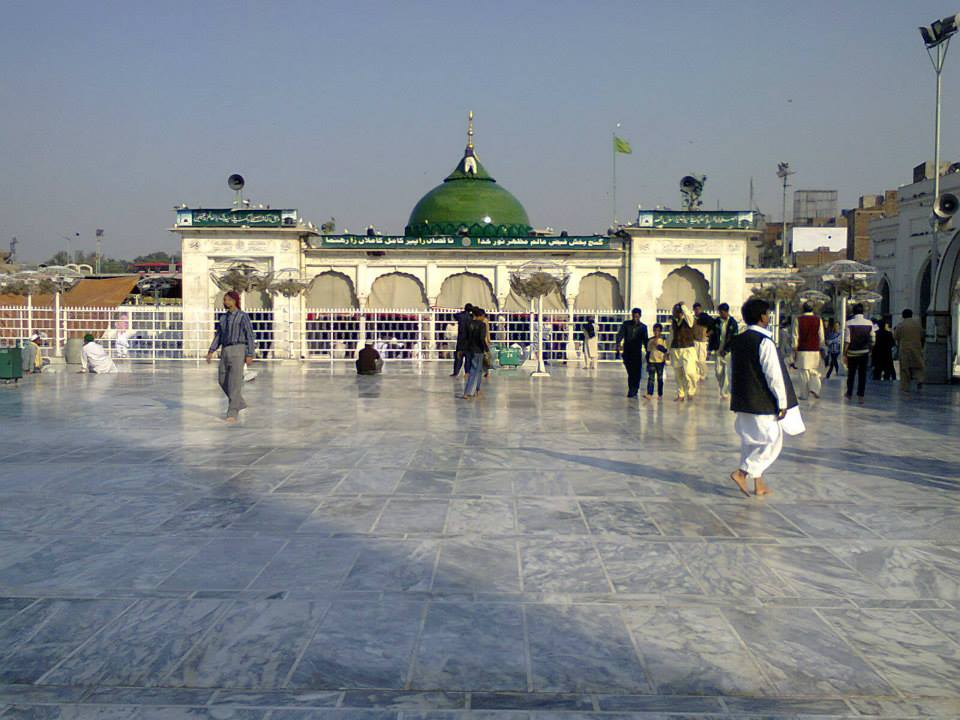
The shrine surrounds the green-domed tomb

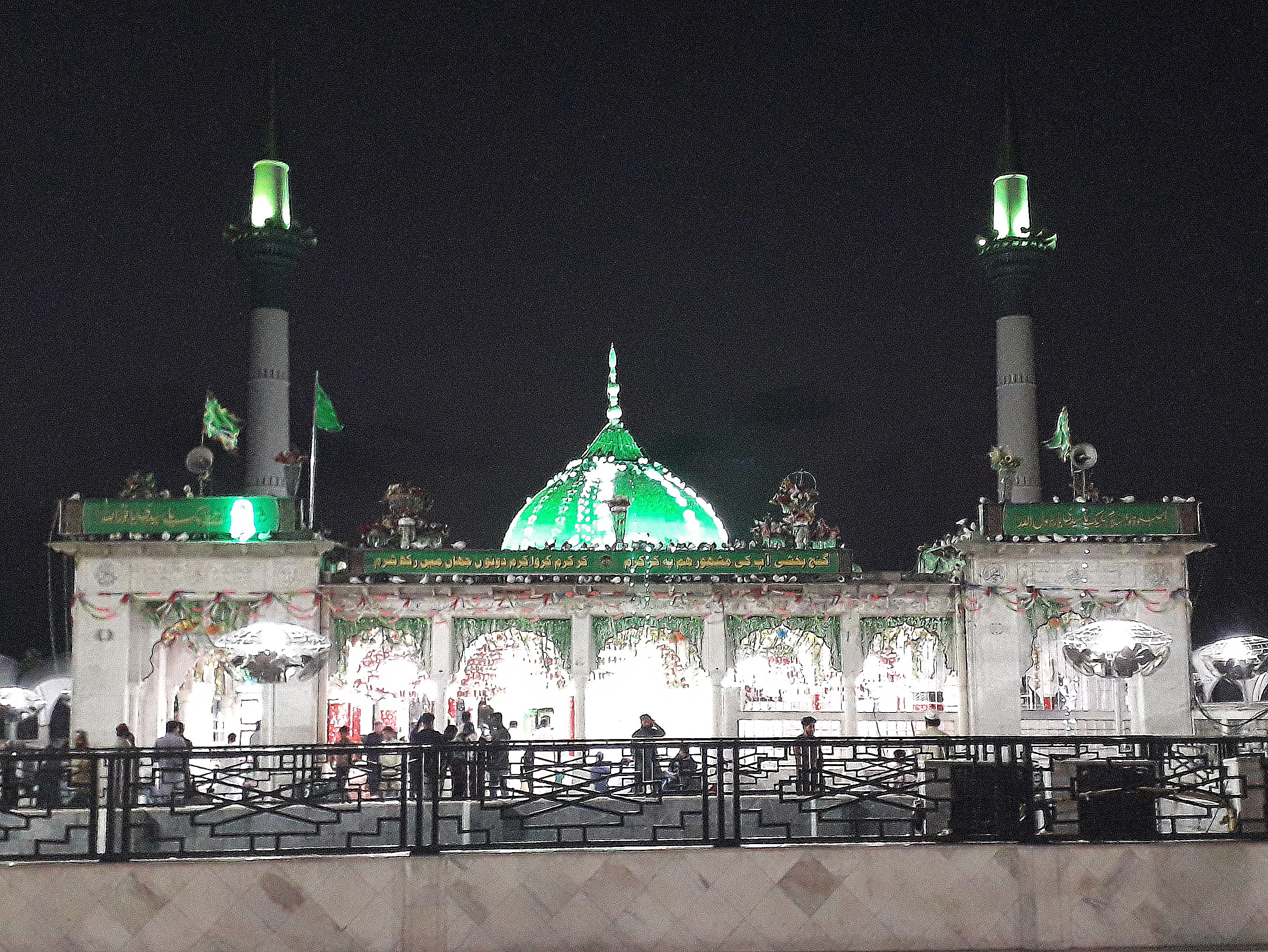
Ali Hajveri Tomb at night

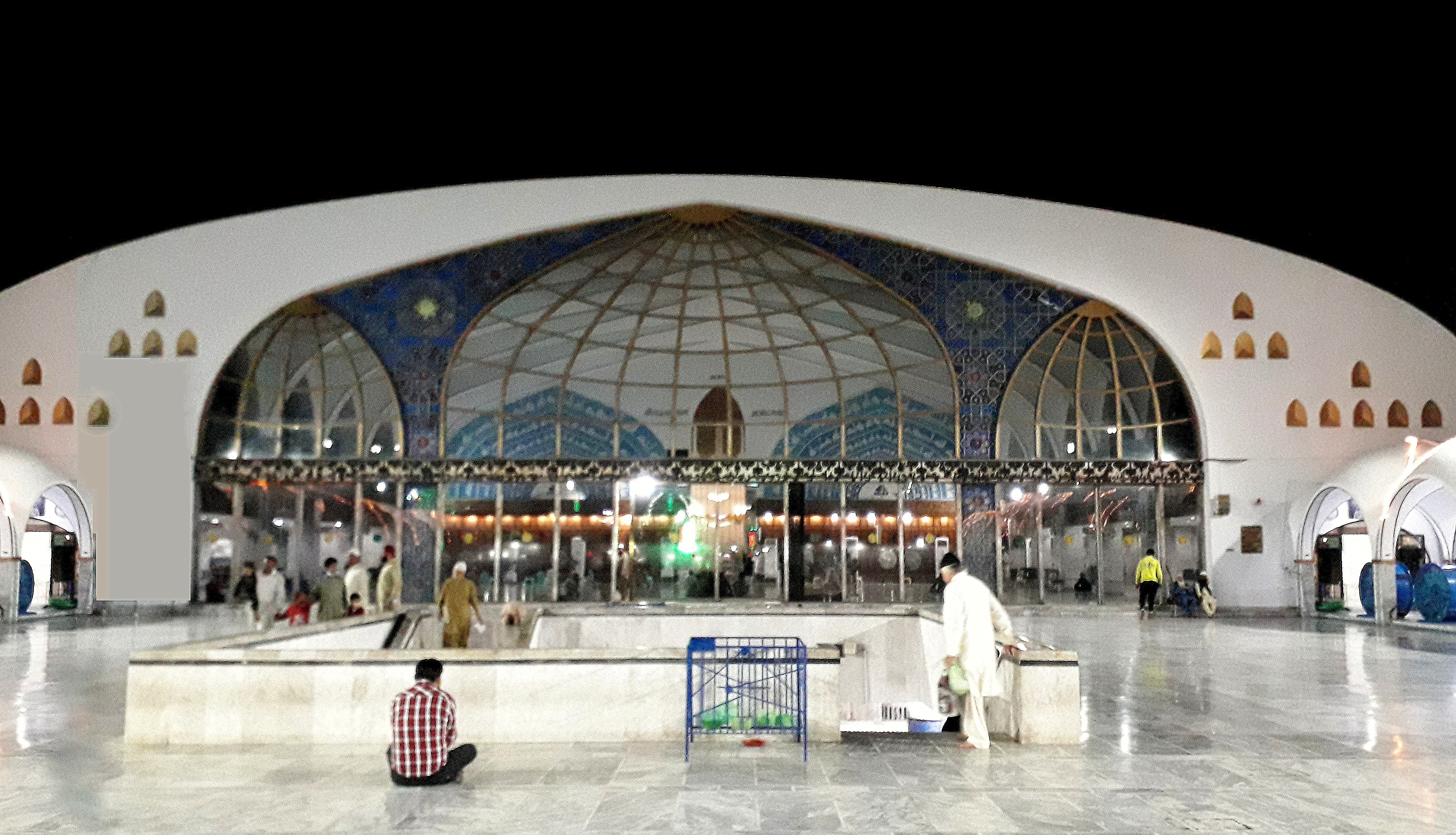
Data Darbar Mosque

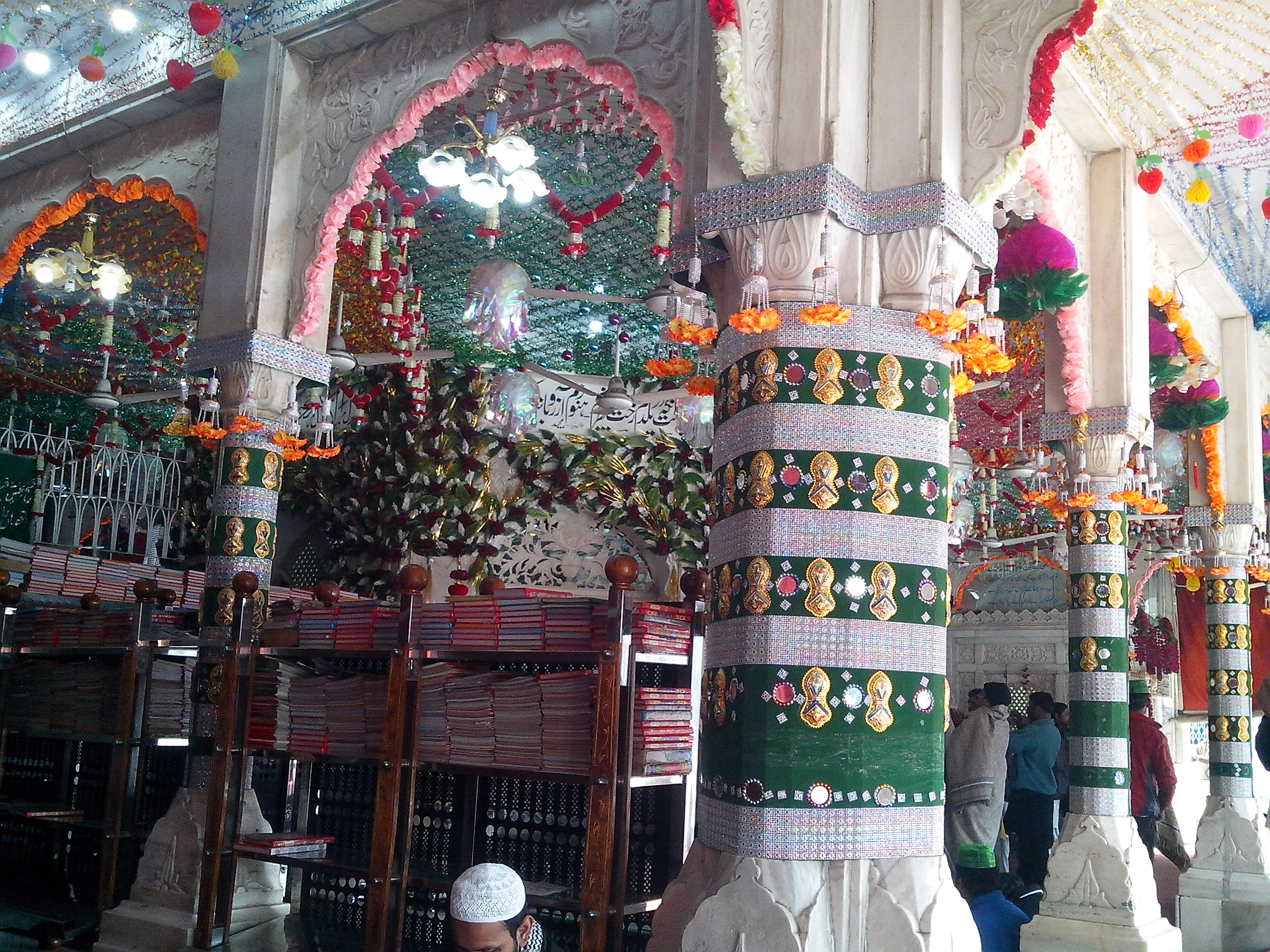
The shine's interior is decorated with mirror work and flowers

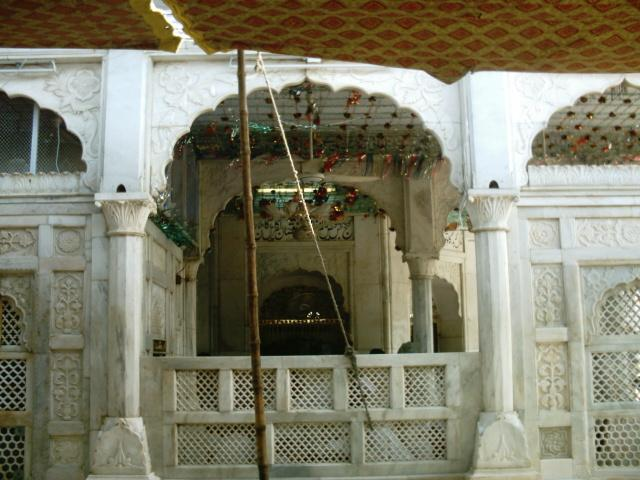
The cenotaph is surrounded by carved marble screens

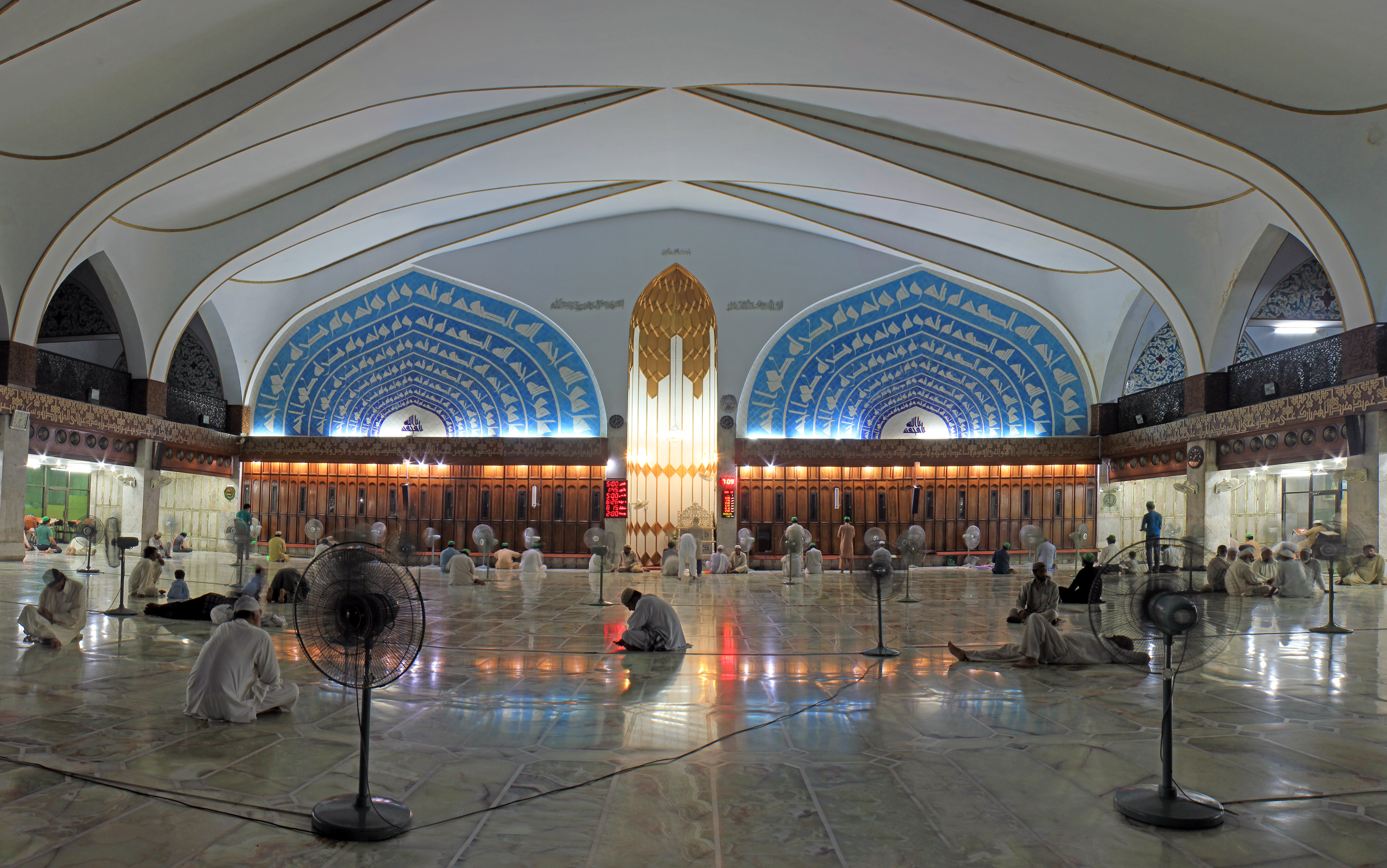
View of the new mosque's interior

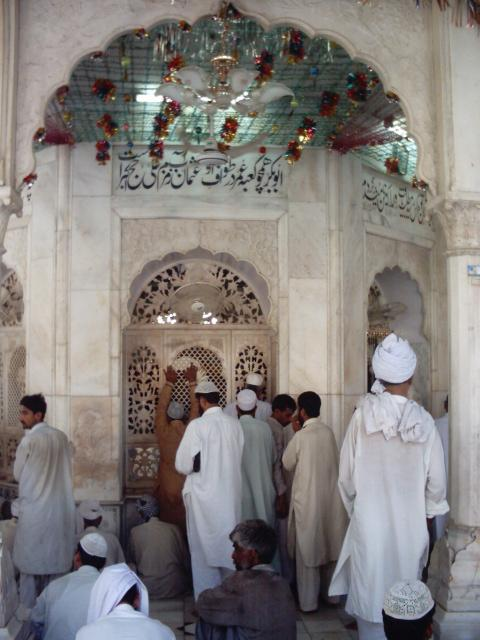
Supplicants at the innermost sanctum of the shrine

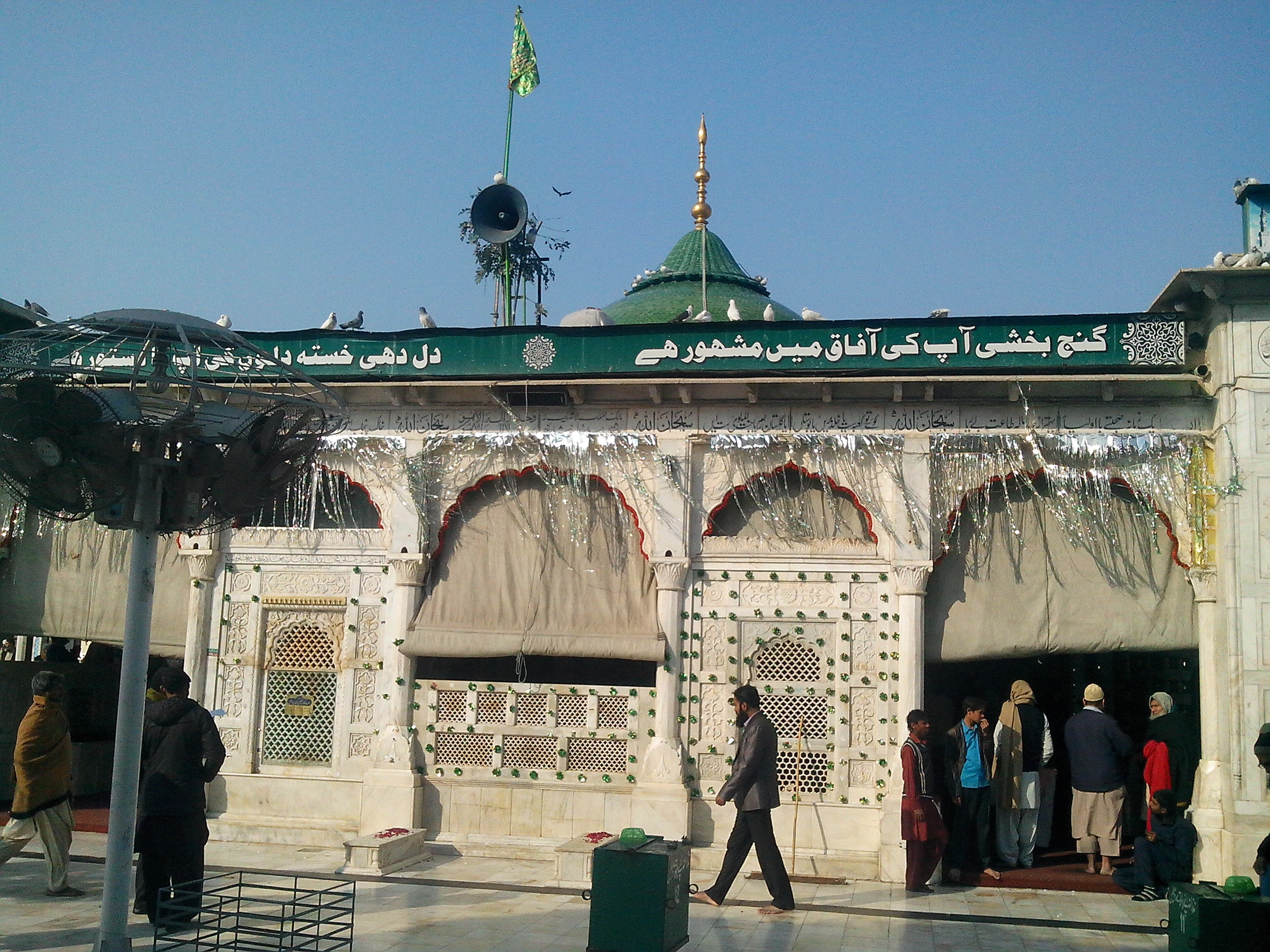
Entrance to the shrine's inner sanctum

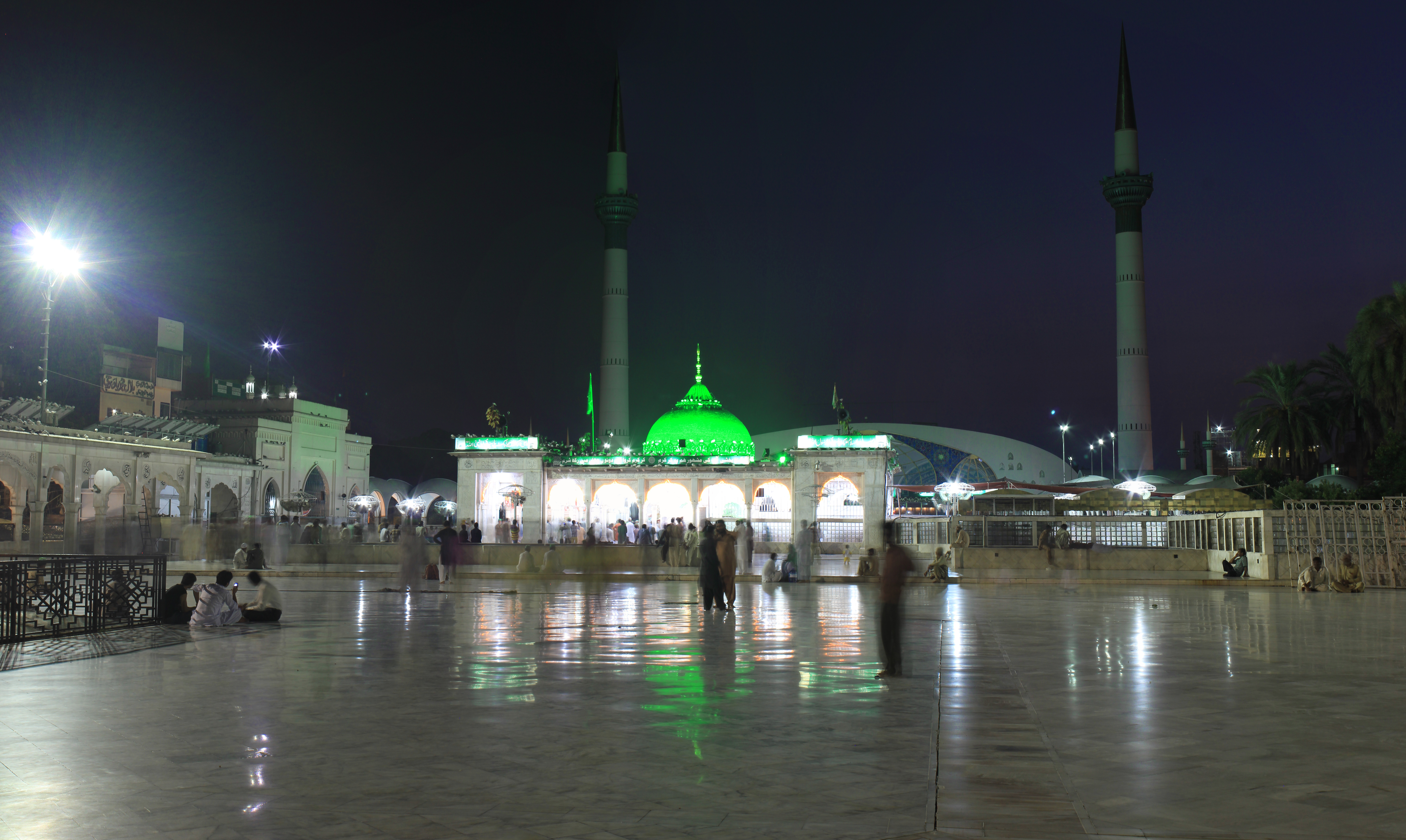
An evening view of the shrine and its adjacent mosque

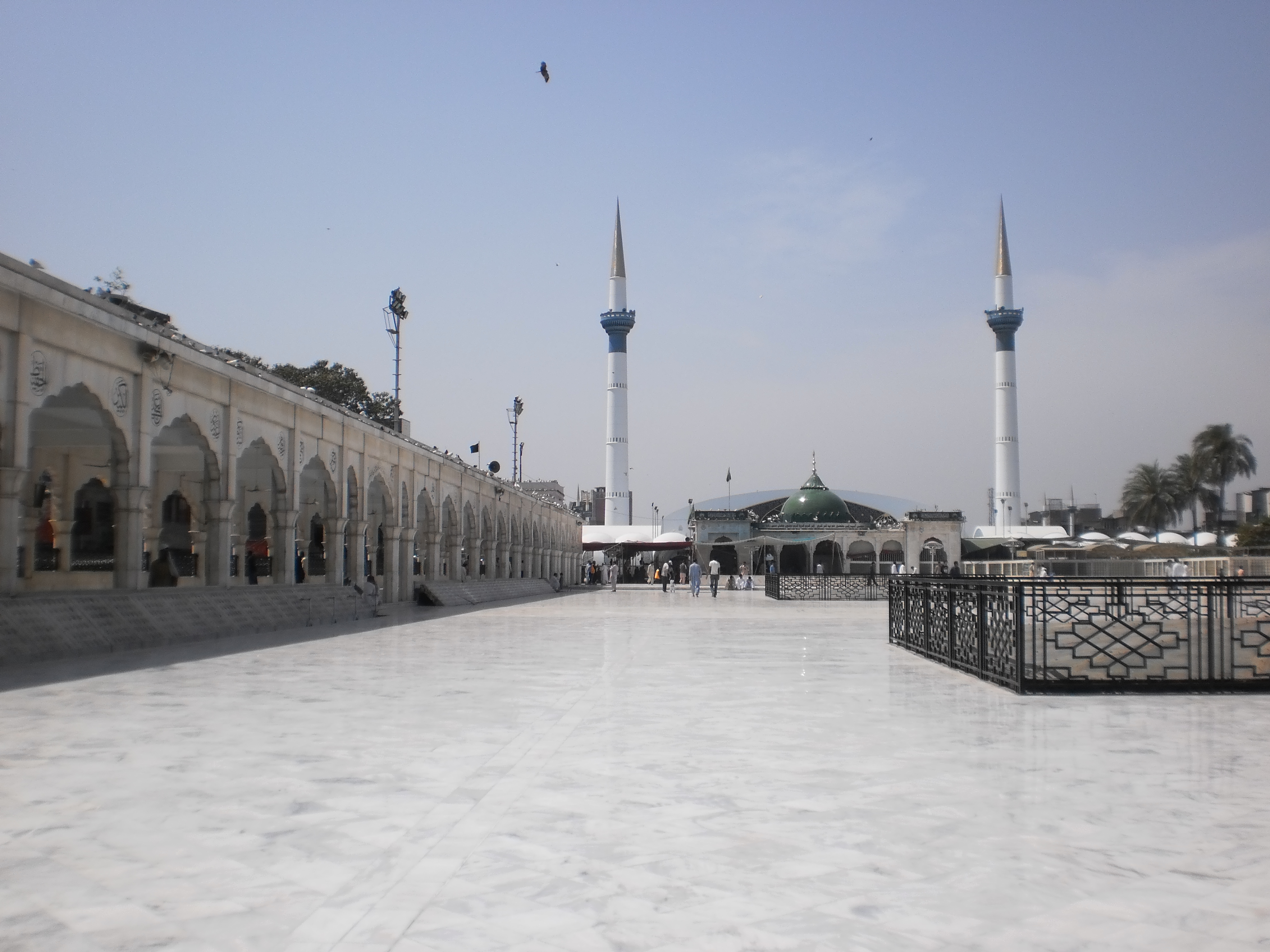
The shrine is fronted by a large courtyard for devotees to gather every Thursday night, as well as on other festival nights.

== See also ==
- List of mausolea and shrines in Pakistan
- Sufism
