= Sarfarosh (1930 film) =

1930 film

- Directed by: A. R. Kardar
- Produced by: Playart Phototone
- Starring: Gul Hamid; Gulzar; Rafiq Ghaznavi; Ghulam Qadir
- Cinematography: K. V. Machve
- Production company: Playart Phototone/United Player's Corporation
- Release date: 1930
- Country: British India
- Language: Silent film

Sarfarosh, also called Brave Hearts, was a 1930 Indian silent film directed by A. R. Kardar. Made as an action adventure film based on the RKO dramas, it was produced by Kardar's production company, "Playart Phototone". According to Hameeduddin Mahmood, the films had double titles up until the mid-1930s; the Hindi/Urdu name for the home market (India), and the English name for the overseas market. Kardar gave up acting after having starred in Husn Ka Daku (1929) and cast Gul Hamid in the main role. He also gave Rafiq Ghaznavi a break as an actor in the film. Ghaznavi went on to become a famous music director.

The cinematographer was K. V. Machve, and the actors were Gul Hamid, Ghulam Qadir, Miss Gulzar, Rafiqe Ghaznavi and Mumtaz.

== Cast ==
- Gul Hamid
- Ghulam Qadir
- Hiralal
- Miss Gulzar
- Mumtaz
- Rafiq Gazanavi

== Release ==
The film, like Husn Ka Daku (1929) was released at Deepak Cinema, in the Bhati Gate area of Lahore. The film was made in thirty weeks and made "1,170 rupees, 2 annas and 6 paisa", making it the "Most successful" film until that time.
