= Khooni Katar =

1931 film

- Directed by: A. R. Kardar
- Produced by: United Players Corporation
- Starring: Gul Hamid; Tamancha Jan; Hiralal; M. Ismail
- Cinematography: K. V. Machve
- Production company: Playart Phototone/United Player's Corporation
- Release date: 1931
- Country: British India
- Language: Silent film

Khooni Katar also called Golden Dagger is a 1931 Indian action adventure silent film directed by A. R. Kardar. The film, also called Sunheri Khanjar, was the fifth film to be produced by Kardar for his United Pictures Corporation. The film is famous for the debut of the actor-producer-director Nazir.

The cast included Gul Hamid, Tamancha Jan, M. Ismail, Hiralal, Ghulam Qadir and M. Zahoor.

== Cast ==
- Gul Hamid
- Tamancha Jan
- M. Ismail
- Hiralal
- Ghulam Qadir
- M. Zahoor
- Ahmed Din
