= Husn Ka Daku =

1929 film

- Directed by: A. R. Kardar
- Produced by: Playart Phototone
- Starring: A. R. Kardar; Tamancha Jan; Iris Crawford; M. Ismail
- Cinematography: D. D. Dabke
- Production company: Playart Phototone/United Player's Corporation
- Release date: 1929
- Country: British India
- Language: Silent film

Husn Ka Daku is a 1929 action adventure silent film directed by A. R. Kardar. The film, also called Mysterious Eagle was made by Kardar's production company Playart Phototone. Kardar acted in this, his first production from Playart Phototone. Playart Phototone was a progression from United Player's Corporation, which Kardar had set up in 1928. Husn Ka Daku was Kardar's debut directorial venture. It set the foundations for the Lahore film industry in the Bhati Gate area of Lahore. The director of photography was D. D. Dabke.

The film starred A. R. Kardar and Tamancha Jan in the lead, with the American actress Iris Crawford, M. Ismail, G. R. John and Ghulam Kadir forming the ensemble cast.

== Cast ==
- A. R. Kardar
- M. Ismail
- Tamancha Jan
- Iris Crawford
- G. R. John
- S. F. Shaw
- Ghulam Qadir

== Release ==
The film saw its release at Deepak Cinema, in the Bhati Gate area of Lahore on 12 July 1930. According to Haroon Khalid the film collected "48 rupees, 6 anna and 3 paisa" in the first week.
