= Bhati Gate =

Residential neighbourhood locality in Lahore, Pakistan

- بھاٹی بُوہا (Punjabi) بھاٹی دروازه (Urdu)
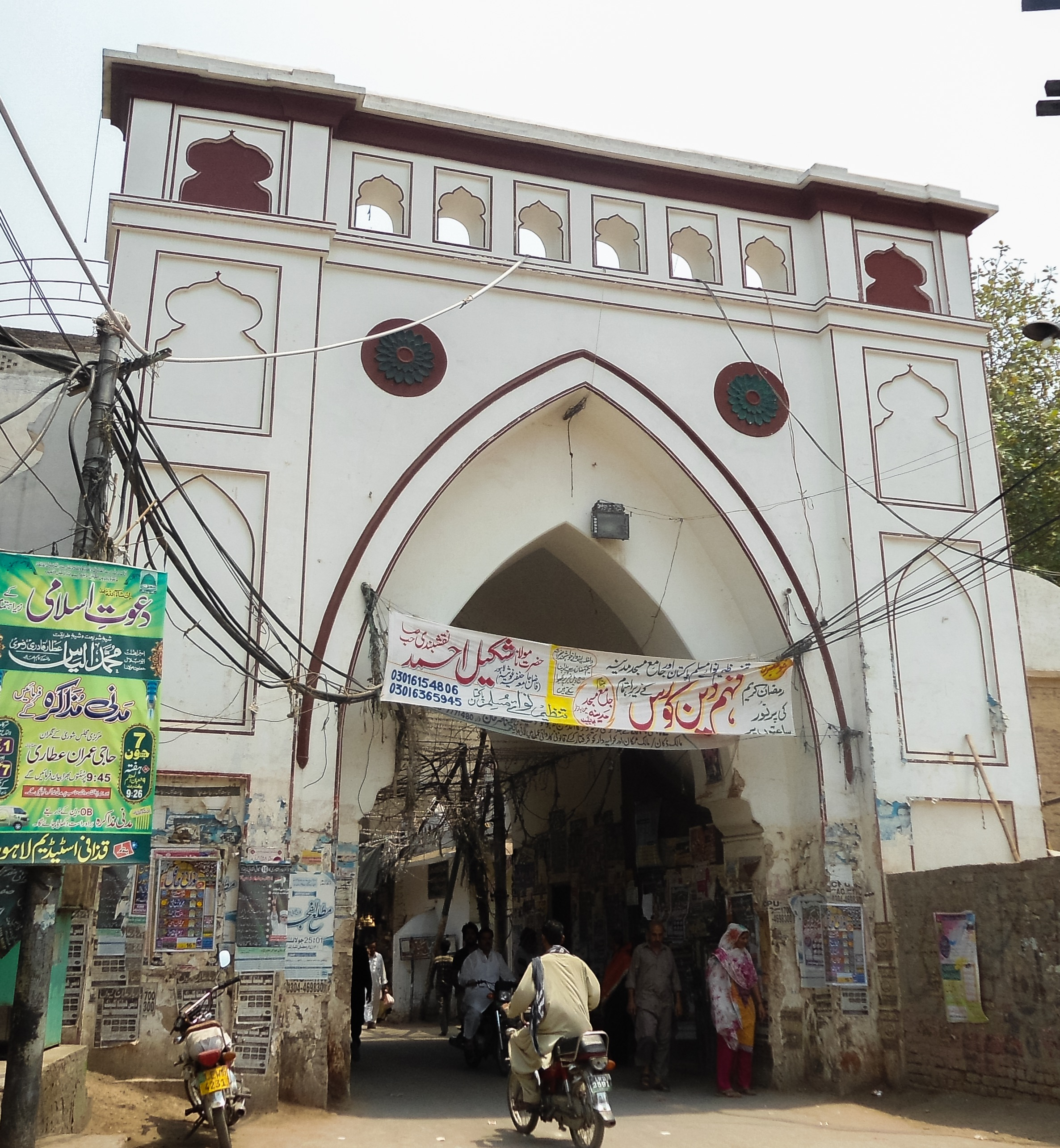
- The façade of Bhati Gate
- Interactive map of Bhati Gate
- Location: Lahore, Punjab, Pakistan
- Coordinates: 31.5790°N 74.3096°E
- Type: City gate

Bhati Gate بھاٹی بُوہا (Punjabi) بھاٹی دروازه (Urdu)
- Union Council
- Interactive map of Bhati Gate
- Country: Pakistan
- Province: Punjab
- City: Lahore
- Zone: Ravi
- Union council: UC 37

Government
  - Type: City Council
  - Chairman: X

Bhati Gate (Punjabi: بھاٹی بُوہا, romanized: Bhāṭī Būhā; Urdu: بھاٹی دروازه, romanized: Bhāṭī Darwāzāh) is one of the thirteen historic gates of the Walled City of Lahore in Lahore, Punjab, Pakistan. Bhati Gate also serves as a union council located in the Ravi Zone.

This gate is located near Data Darbar and is similar in design to Kashmiri Gate.

== Background ==
Bhati Gate entrance is located on the western wall of the Old City. It is one of the two oldest entry points into the Walled City which controlled the only major north-south thoroughfare during Ghaznavid period. The gate is said to be named after the Bhati clan that lived here.

== History ==
It is named after the Bhati clan. When Emperor Akbar expanded the city eastward and divided it into nine districts, Bhati Gate and its bazar marked the boundary between Mubarak Khan in the east, and Talwarra in the west.

The famed poet Allama Iqbal lived in a house near Bhati Gate between 1901 and 1905.

== Environs ==
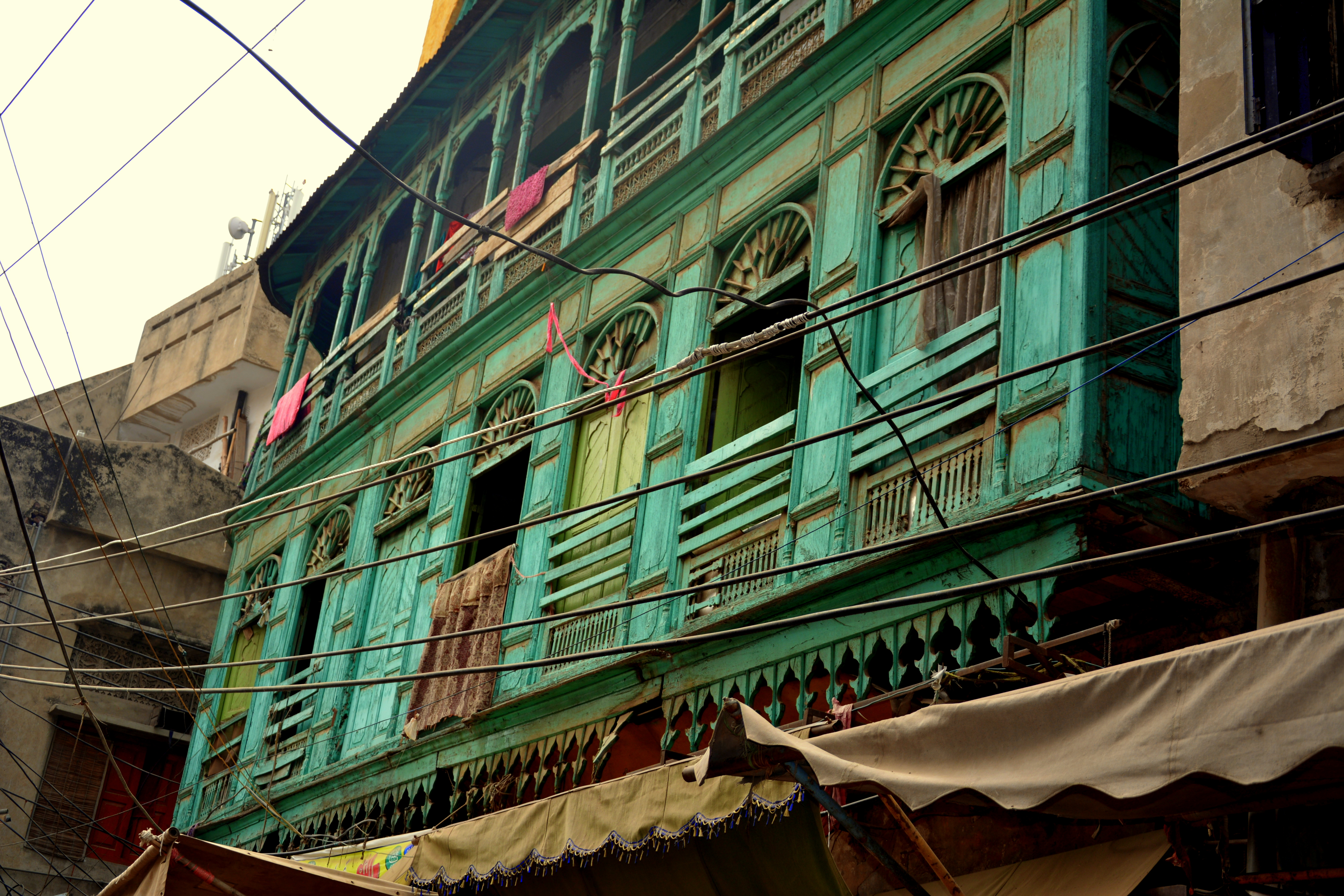
The neighbourhood inside the gate features colonial and Sikh era architecture

Bhati Gate is known historically as a centre for arts and literature in Old Lahore. The area inside the gate is well known throughout the city for its food. Just outside Bhati Gate is Data Durbar, the mausoleum of the Sufi saint Ali Hajweri (also known as Data Ganj Baksh). Every Thursday evening musicians used to gather here to perform Qawwali music, though these are sometimes replaced with Naats and religious sermons.

The gate serves as the starting point for Lahore's Hakiman Bazaar, and is located near the Fakir Khana Museum. Near the gate is also located the Old City's Oonchi Mosque. The Bhati Gate neighbourhood also serves as Union Council 29 (UC 29) in Tehsil Ravi of Lahore City District.

== Gallery ==
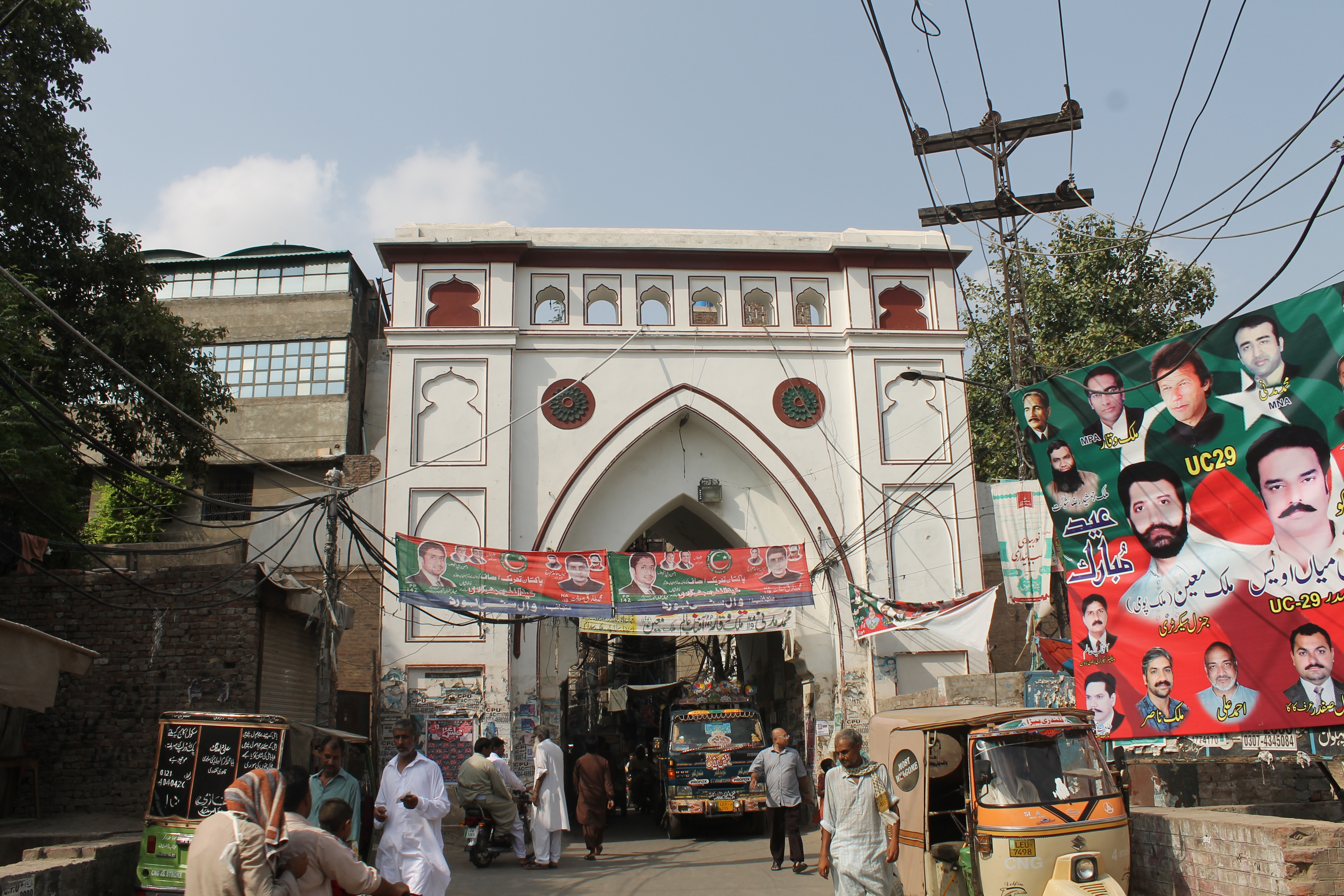

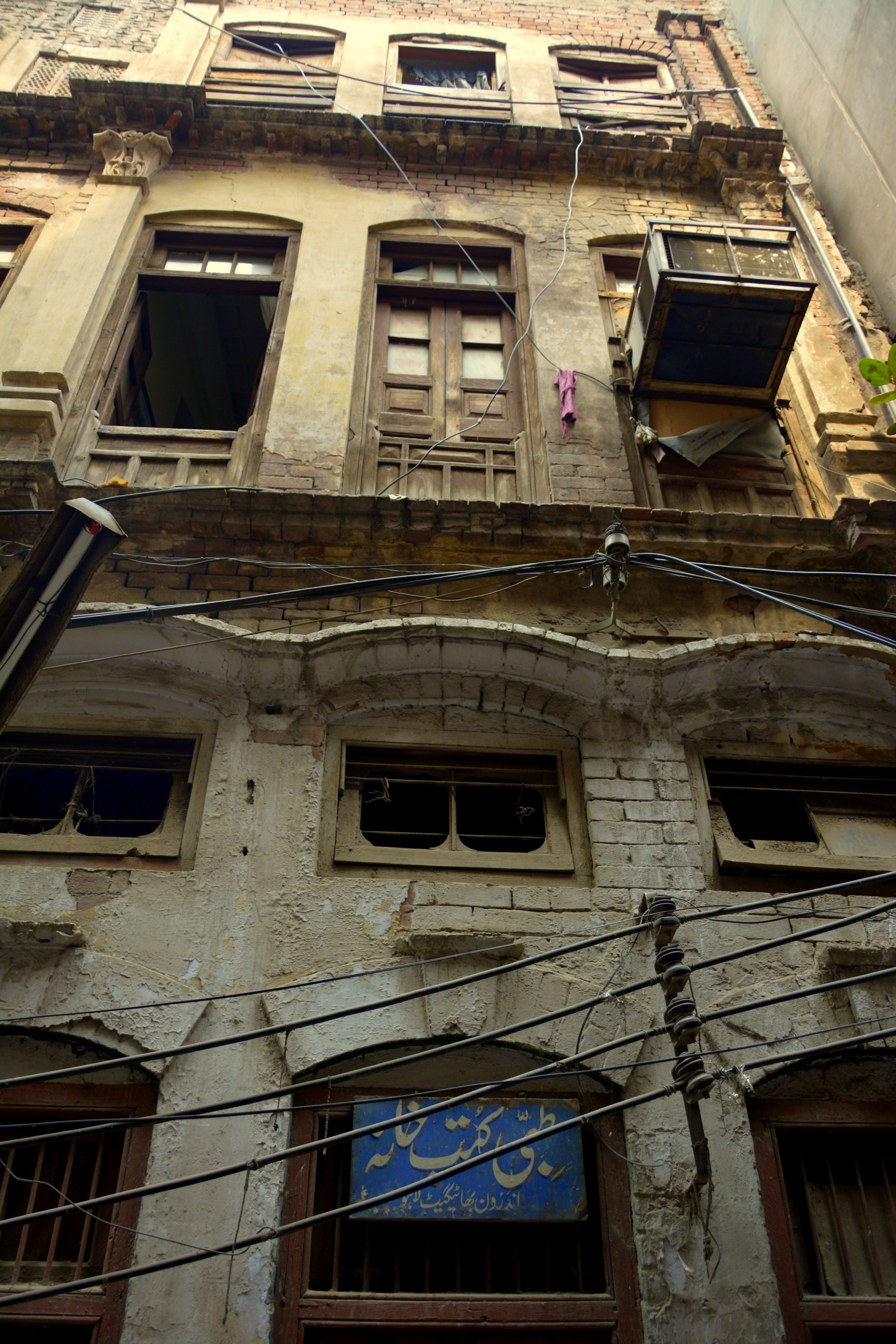
Buildings inside the gate feature colonial architecture

== See also ==
- Lahore
- Lahore Fort
- Walled City of Lahore
- Badshahi Mosque
