= List of Hindi films of 1951 =

A list of films produced by the Bollywood film industry based in Mumbai in 1951:

== Highest-grossing films ==
The ten highest-grossing films at the Indian box office in 1951:

Rank	Title	Gross collection
1	Awaara	₹2.30 crore
2	Baazi	₹1.80 crore
3	Albela	₹1.65 crore
4	Deedar	₹1.45 crore
5	Jadoo	₹1.35 crore
6	Bahar	₹1.25 crore
7	Anand Math	₹1.10 crore
8	Baadal	₹90 lakh
9	Hum Log	₹85 lakh
10	Afsana	₹80 lakh

== A-B ==
Title	Director	Cast	Genre	Notes/Music
25th July	Chitra Mitra	Chandravati, Pahari Sanyal, Raj Kumar	Social	Music: Nichiketa Ghosh Lyrics: B. M. Sharma
Aaram	D.D. Kashyap	Madhubala, Dev Anand, Prem Nath, Talat Mehmood, Durga Khote, Hiralal, Manmohan Krishna, Tabassum, Leela Mishra	Romance - 1 Girl & 3 Suitors	Music: Anil Biswas Lyrics: Rajendra Krishan, Prem Dhawan
Actor	Ramji Arya	Ramola, Geeta Nazami, Bhagwan, Sunder, Sulochana, Gulzar, Murad	Action Drama	Music: Aziz Hindi-Ibrahim Lyrics: Shewan Rizvi-Nazim Panipati
Adaa	D. C. Goel	Rehana, Shekhar, Gope, Madan Puri, Mohana, Shanta Kanwar	Action Romance	Music: Madan Mohan Kohli Lyrics: Behzad Lakhnavi, Raja Mehdi Ali Khan, Saraswati Kumar Deepak, Prem Dhawan
Afsana	B. R. Chopra	Ashok Kumar, Veena, Pran, Jeevan	Crime Thriller Romance	Music: Husnlal Bhagatram Lyrics: Gafil Harnalvi, Asad Bhopali, Chander Oberoi, Saraswati Kumar Deepak
Albela	Bhagwan	Geeta Bali, Bhagwan, Sunder, Pratima Devi, Nihal, Maruti, Dulari, Badri Prasad	Drama Romance	Music: C. Ramchandra Lyrics: Rajendra Krishan
Amanat	Aravind Sen	Bharat Bhushan, Nazir Hussain, Asha Mathur, Pran, Chand Usmani	Drama Social	Music: Salil Choudhary Lyrics: Shailendra
Andolan	Phani Mujumdar	Kishore Kumar, Sushma, Pushpa, Manju, Krishnakant, Shivraj, Parshuram	National Social Drama	Freedom Fight including Gandhi & Patel Satygraha, Simon Commission and 1942 Quit India Agitation. Music: Pannalal Ghosh Lyrics: Indeevar, Niaz Haider, Bankim Chandra Chatterjee
Awaara	Raj Kapoor	Raj Kapoor, Nargis, Prithviraj Kapoor, Leela Chitnis, K. N. Singh, Shashi Kapoor	Crime Thriller/Romance	Music: Shankar–Jaikishan Lyrics: Hasrat Jaipuri, Shailendra
Azaadi Ke Baad	D. K. Chatterji	Meera Mishra, Asit Baran, Pannalal Ghosh, Tandon	Social Drama	Music: K. P. Sen Lyrics: M. Razi Banarsi
Baazi	Guru Dutt	Dev Anand, Geeta Bali, Kalpana Kartik, Johnny Walker, K. N. Singh, Rashid Khan, Krishan Dhawan	Crime Thriller	Music: Sachin Dev Burman Lyrics: Sahir Ludhianvi
Baadal	Amiya Chakravarty	Madhubala, Premnath, Purnima, Hiralal, Randhir, S. Nazir, Agha	Action Costume Romance	Based on Sherwood Forest Legend. Music: Shankar–Jaikishan Lyrics: Hasrat Jaipuri, Shailendra
Babla	Agradoot	Paresh Banerjee, Naren Bhattacharya, Nibhanani Devi, Jahar Ganguli, Prabhadevi, Pahari Sanyal, Sova Sen	Social	Robin Chatterjee
Bade Bhaiyya	Aspi Irani	Nirupa Roy, Suresh, Agha, Yakub, Husn Banu, Naaz, Habib	Family Drama	Music: Prem Nath Lyrics: Manohar Khanna
Bade Sahab	G. P. Pawar	Bhagwan, Leela Gupte, Baburao, Habib, Usha	Social	Music: Nissar Lyrics: Hasrat Jaipuri
Badi Bahu	S. Bhagat	Nimmi, Shekhar, Sulochana Chatterji, Shivraj, Chanda	Family Drama	Music: Anil Biswas Lyrics: Prem Dhawan
Bahar		Vyjayanthimala, Karan Dewan, Pran, Pandhari Bai, Gope, Chaman Puri, Leela Mishra, Om Prakash, Sunder	Romantic Drama	Music: S. D. Burman Lyrics: Rajendra Krishan
Bedardi	Kidar Sharma	Geeta Bali, Nimmi, Jaswant, Amirbai Karnataki, Nazira, Manju, Rashid Khan, Cuckoo	Social	Music: Lyrics:
Bhai Ka Pyar	Raja Nene	Nalini Jaywant, Karan Dewan, Jagdish Sethi, Sunalini Devi	Family Drama	Music: Ramchandra Pal Lyrics: Mukhram Sharma
Bhola Shankar	Vishram Bedekar	Mahipal, Prem Adib, Vijaylaxmi, Bhagwan, Sadhna Bose, Sheela Naik	Mythology	Music: Snehal Bhatkar Lyrics: Bharat Vyas
Bikhare Moti	S. N. Yusuf	Nigar Sultana, Kamini Kaushal, Jayant, Jeevan, Neelam, Ranjana	Social Drama	Music: Ghulam Mohammed Lyrics: Akhtar ul Iman
Buzdil	Shahid Lateef	Kishore Sahu, Nimmi, Premnath, Kanhaiyalal, Sunalini Devi, Cuckoo	Social	Music: S. D. Burman Lyrics: Shailendra, Kaifi Azmi

== C-K ==
Title	Director	Cast	Genre	Notes/Music
Damad	Brij Rani	Bhagwan, Krishna Kumari, Yashodhara Katju, Pratima Devi, Cuckoo, Gajanan Jagirdar	Family	Music: Indravadan Bhatt, Ram Panjwani (3), Shyamu (1) Lyrics: Bahaar Ajmeri, Manohar Singh Sehrai (dialogues)
Daman	Nanabhai Bhatt	Ajit, Nigar Sultana, Pran, Yashodhara Katju, Agha, Hiralal	Family Drama	Music: K. Dutta Lyrics: Raja Mehdi Ali Khan, Ehsan Rizvi (1), Rajendra Krishan (1), Anjum Jaipuri (1)
Dasavtaar	Jayant Desai	Nirupa Roy, Trilok Kapoor, Murad, Jeevan, Niranjan Sharma, Tabassum	Mythological	Music: Avinash Vyas Lyrics: Saraswati Kumar Deepak (5), B. P. Bhargav (5), Munshi Sagar Hussain (2)
Deedar	Nitin Bose	Dilip Kumar, Ashok Kumar, Nargis, Nimmi, Sapru	Romantic drama	Music: Naushad Lyrics: Shakeel Badayuni
Deepak	Chandrashekhar	Prithviraj Kapoor, Vijaylaxmi, Umesh Sharma, Sajjan, Kamal Mehra, Shanti Madhok	Social Drama	Music: Ram Ganguly Lyrics: Madhukar Rajasthani, Narendra Sharma (2)
Dholak	Roop K. Shorey	Ajit, Meena Shorey, Manmohan Krishna, Yashodhara Katju, Majnu, Shakuntala	Social Drama	Music: Shyam Sundar Lyrics: Aziz Kashmiri
Dilbar	Raja Ram	Agha, Raja, Bibi, Tiwari, Leela Kumari, Siddiqui, Mumtaz		Music: Avinash Sufi Samaj Lyrics: S. A. Ghaffar
Do Sitare	D. D. Kashyap	Dev Anand, Suraiya, Premnath, Kuldip Kaur, Mumtaz, Shakuntala Paranjpye	Social Drama	Music: Anil Biswas Lyrics: Rajendra Krishan
Ek Nazar	O. P. Dutta	Nalini Jaywant, Karan Dewan, Kuldip Kaur, Rehman, Gope, Raj Mehra, Randhir	Romantic Drama	Music: S. D. Burman Lyrics: Rajendra Krishan
Ek Tha Ladka	Room Sanware	Bharat Bhushan, Geeta Bali, Geeta Nizami, Tiwari, Jankidas	Social	Music: Murari, Rajhans Kataria Lyrics: Ehsan Elahi (3), Rajesh Kumar (5), Kamal R.C. (2)
Ek Tha Raja	K. Ramnath	M. G. Ramachandran, Anjali Devi, Pandaribai, Madhavi Devi, S. V. Sahasraman	Costume Drama	Music: C. R. Subramaniam Lyrics: Sudarshan
For Ladies Only a.k.a. Titli	Bedi	Sadhana Bose, Kuldip Kaur, Rupa Verman, Kamal Mehra, Satish	Social	Music: Vinod Lyrics: Sohanlal Sahir, B. R. Sharma, Sahrai
Ghayal	Ramchandra Thakur	Geeta Bali, Sheikh Mukhtar, Sulochana Chatterjee, Jawahar Kaul, Yashwant Dave, Pesi Patel, Mirza Musharaf	Action Social	Music: Gyan Dutt Lyrics: Saraswati Kumar Deepak, Manohar Khanna
Hamari Shaan	Balwant Bhatt	Bharat Bhushan, Veera, Durga Khote, Yakub, Agha, S. N. Tripathi, David, Yashodhara Katju	Family Drama	Music: Chitragupta Lyrics: Anjum Jaipuri, Saraswati Kumar Deepak, Raja Mehdi Ali Khan (1)
Hanuman Patal Vijay	Homi Wadia	Meena Kumari, Mahipal, Amarnath, Niranjan Sharma, Dalpat, Bimla, Shanta Kanwar	Religious	Music: S. N. Tripathi Lyrics:
Hulchul	Shubh Karan Ojha	Dilip Kumar, Nargis, Sitara Devi, Yakub, Jeevan, Balraj Sahni	Family Social Drama	Music: Sajjad Hussain, Mohammed Shafi Niyazi Lyrics: Khumar Barabankvi
Humlog	Zia Sarhadi	Nutan, Balraj Sahni, Shyama, Sajjan, Kanhaiyalal, Durga Khote, Cuckoo, Ratan	Social	Music: Roshan Lyrics: Udhav Kumar, Vishwamitra Adil
Ishwar Bhakti	Gunjal	Trilok Kapoor, Nirupa Roy, Shalini, Urvashi, Nand Kishore	Devotional	Music: Sonik, Giridhar Lyrics: Narendra Sharma
Jadoo	A. R. Kardar	Nalini Jaywant, Suresh, Krishna Kumar, E. Billimoria	Crime Romance	Music: Naushad Lyrics: Shakeel Badayuni
Jai Mahakali	Dhirubhai Desai	Nirupa Roy, Shahu Modak, Shanta Kunwar, Lalita Pawar, Ulhas, S. N. Tripathi	Religious	Music: Kumar Lyrics: Saraswati Kumar Deepak, Firoz Jalandhari
Jai Mahalaxmi	Nanubhai Vakil	Shobhana Samarth, Mahipal, Usha Kiran, Arun, Nirmala, Tiwari, Ramsingh	Religious	Music: Avinash Vyas Lyrics: Mulkraj Bhakri, Saraswati Kumar Deepak, B. P. Bhargav
Jai Shankar	Ishwarlal	Ishwarlal, Ranjana, Shakuntala, Niranjan Sharma, Babu Raje, Kesari, Heera Sawant	Religious	Music: Khemchand Prakash Lyrics: Neelkanth Tiwari, Ambikesh Kuntal
Jawani Ki Aag	H. S. Rawail	Ramola, Iftekhar, Robin Majumdar, Hiralal, Manorama, Sunder	Social	Music: G. A. Chisti Lyrics: Jameel Mazhari, G. A. Chishti
Johari	Niranjan	Amarnath, Geeta Bali, Manorama, Sunder, Cuckoo, Rajan Haksar	Social	Music: Harbans Lal Lyrics: Tejnath Zar
Kali Ghata	Kishore Sahu	Bina Rai, Kishore Sahu, Gope, Asha Mathur, Ulhas, Jeevan, Cuckoo	Romantce Drama	Music: Shanker-Jaikishen Lyrics: Hasrat Jaipuri, Shailendra
Kashmir	Rajendra Jolly	Nirupa Roy, Veena, Kamal Kapoor, Aroon, Achala Sachdev, Sajjan, Al Nasir, Tiwari	Social Drama	Music: Hansraj Behl Lyrics: Sarshar Sailani
Khazana	M. Sadiq	Nasir Khan, Madhubala, Gope, Om Prakash, Cuckoo, Raj Mehra, Ramesh Thakur	Social	Music: C. Ramchandra Lyrics: Rajendra Krishan

== L-R ==
Title	Director	Cast	Genre	Notes/Music
Lachak	M. R. Dharamsey	Geeta Bali, Amarnath, Kuldip Kaur, Agha, Ram Singh, Paro Devi	Social	Music: Motiram Lyrics: Sheikh Adam, Shreeram Vohra, Hasrat Jaipuri, Shakeel Badayuni
Laxmi Narayan	Nanabhai Bhatt	Meena Kumari, Mahipal, Amarnath, Dalpat, B. M. Vyas, Vasantrao Pahelwan, S. N. Tripathi	Religious	Music: S. N. Tripathi Lyrics: B. D. Mishra, Ramesh Pandey
Lav Kush	Nanabhai Bhatt	Prem Adib, Nirupa Roy, Umakant, Amirbai Karnataki, Badri Prasad	Mythology	Music: Shanti Kumar Lyrics: Ramesh Gupta
Lokmanya Bal Gangadhar Tilak	Vishram Bedekar		Documentary	Music:
Madhosh	J. B. H. Wadia	Manhar Desai, Meena Kumari, Usha Kiran, S. Nasir, Mubarak, Rajan, Goldstein, Jilloo	Social	Music: Madan Mohan Lyrics: Raja Mehdi Ali Khan
Maldar	Amit Mitra	Balraj Sahni, Smriti Biswas, Nilima, Chhabi Biswas	Social	Music: Satish Bhatia Lyrics: Pran
Malhar	Tara Harish	Shammi, Arjun, Sankatha Prasad, Prem, Moti Sagar, Kanhaiyalal, Sonalini Devi	Family Drama	Produced by Mukesh. Music: Roshan Lyrics: Indeevar, Kaif Irfani
Malati Madhav	M. Neelkanth	Durga Khote, Anant Marathe, Shakuntala, Balakram Kelkar	Social	Music: Sudhir Phadke Lyrics: Narendra Sharma
Mangla	S. S. Vasan	Ranjan, P. Bhanumati, J Doraiswamy, Agha, David, B. S. Kale, Badri Prasad, Suryaprabha	Costume Drama	Music: M. D. Parthasarathy Lyrics:
Maya Machhindra	Aspi Irani	Nirupa Roy, Trilok Kapoor, Usha Kiran, Shanta Kunwar, Amirbai Karnataki	Biopic Devotional	Music: Premnath Lyrics: Manohar Khanna, Neelkanth Tiwari
Nadaan	Hira Singh	Dev Anand, Madhubala, Sunalini Devi, Madan Puri, Manmohan Krishna, Mubarak, Chaman Puri	Romantic Drama	Music: Chic Chocolate Lyrics: Pyarelal Santoshi
Nagina	Ravindra Dave	Nasir Khan, Nutan, Gope, Mohana, Hiralal, Bipin Gupta, Goldstein, Shamlal	Suspense Romance	Music: Shankar Jaikishan Lyrics: Shailendra, Hasrat Jaipuri
Nai Zindagi	Mohan Sinha	Nirupa Roy, Amarnath, Kuldip Kaur, Durga Khote, Ulhas, Shanta Kanwar, Narmada Shankar	Social	Music: Murari Sharma Lyrics:
Nakhare	Surya Kumar	Nasir Khan, Geeta Bali, Jeevan, David, Paro Devi, Heera Sawant	Romance Drama	Music: Hansraj Behl Lyrics: Bharat Vyas, Tahir Lakhnavi
Nandkishore	Vasant Joglekar	Nalini Jaywant, Mahipal, Durga Khote, Lalita Pawar, Baburao Pendharker, Rajan	Devotional	Music: Snehal Bhatkar Lyrics: Narendra Sharma
Naujawan	Mahesh Kaul	Nalini Jaywant, Premnath, Yashodhara Katju, Kamal Mehra, Zeb Qureshi, Cuckoo, S. N. Banerjee	Social	Music: S. D. Burman Lyrics: Sahir Ludhianvi
Nazneen	N. K. Ziri	Madhubala, Nasir Khan, Jayant, Agha, Om Prakash, Cuckoo, Chanchal, Ram Avtar, Pratima Devi	Romantic Drama	Music: Ghulam Mohammed Lyrics: Shakeel Badayuni
Phoolon Ke Haar	G. P. Pawar	Nasir Khan, Geeta Bali, Nigar Sultana, Yashodhara Katju, Hiralal, Sunder, Madhav Kale	Drama	Music: Hansraj Behl Lyrics: Bharat Vyas, Indeevar, D. N. Madhok
Pyar Ki Baten	Akhtar Hussain	Trilok Kapoor, Nargis, Nazir, Maruti, Nissar, Khurshid, Cuckoo	Social	Music: Bulo C. Rani, Khayyam Lyrics: Khawar Zaman, M. L. Khanna
Rajput	Lekhraj Bhakri	Suraiya, P. Jairaj, Kuldip Kaur, Sapru, Maruti, Randhir	Action Drama	Music: Hansraj Behl Lyrics: Bharat Vyas, Indeevar, Asad Bhopali, Kaif Irfani
Ram Janma	Nanabhai Bhatt	Nirupa Roy, Trilok Kapoor, Veera, Shobhana Samarth, Ramsingh	Religious	Music: Avinash Vyas Lyrics: Ramesh Gupta
Riding Hero	Chandrakant Gaur	Maruti, P. Kailash, Basant Malini, Bhim, Babu Raje	Action	Music: Indravardhan Bhatt Lyrics:

== S-Z ==
Title	Director	Cast	Genre	Notes/Music
Saagar	P. Jairaj	Nargis, P. Jairaj, Bharat Bhushan, Durga Khote, Veera, K. N. Singh, David	Family Romance triangle	Music: S. K. Pal Lyrics: Narendra Sharma
Sabz Bagh	Aziz Kashmiri	Nimmi, Shekhar, Pran, Chand Burque, Om Prakash, Suraiya Choudhary, Kamal Kapoor, Rashid Khan, Majnu, Cuckoo	Social Drama	Music: Vinod, Gulshan Sufi Lyrics: Aziz Kashmiri
Sagai	H. S. Rawail	Premnath, Gope, Yakub, Sunder, Cuckoo, Rehana, Vijayalaxmi, Purnima, Mohana, Iftekhar	Family Drama	Music: C. Ramchandra Lyrics: Rajendra Krishan
Saiyan	M. Sadiq	Madhubala, Sajjan, Raj Mehra, Jayant, Ramesh Thakur, Cuckoo, Amar, Leela Chitnis	Romantic melodrama	Music: Sajjad Hussain Lyrics: Rajinder Krishan, D.N. Madhok, Hasrat Jaipuri (1)
Sanam	Nandlal Jaswantlal	Dev Anand, Suraiya, Meena Kumari, Gope, K. N. Singh, Pratima Devi, Jillobai		Music: Husanlal Bhagatram Lyrics: Qamar Jalalabadi
Sansar	S. S. Vasan	M. K. Radha, Vanaja, Pushpavalli, Mohana, Agha, Ishwarlal, Ratnappa, Swaraj, David	Social	Music: Parthasarthi, B. S. Kalla, Lyrics: Pandit Indra
Sarkar	K. Amarnath	Ajit, Veena, Usha Kiran, Shashikala, Hiralal, Ulhas, S. Nazir, Cuckoo, Murad	Costume Action Drama	Music: Gobind Ram Lyrics:
Saudagar	M. I. Dharamsey	Nasir Khan, Rehana, K. N. Singh, Shakuntala Paranjpye, Bhudo Advani, Suraiya Choudhary	Social Drama	Music: C. Ramchandra Lyrics: Pyarelal Santoshi, Hasrat Jaipuri, Hanuman Prasad
Sazaa	Fali Mistry	Dev Anand, Nimmi, Shyama, K. N. Singh, Lalita Pawar, Mukri, Durga Khote, Gope	Romantic melodrama	Music: S. D. Burman Lyrics: Rajendra Krishan, Sahir Ludhianvi (1)
Shabistan	B. Mitra	Naseem Banu, Shyam, Sapru, Murad, Cuckoo, Bipin Gupta	Costume Drama	Shyam died during the making of this film from a fall off a horseback. Music: Madan Mohan, C. Ramchandra Lyrics: Qamar Jalalabadi
Shagun	S. Arora	Sulochana Chatterji, Kamal Kapoor, Bhudo Advani, Wasti Ranjit Kumari		Music: Husnlal Bhagatram, Sardul Kwatra Lyrics: Mulkraj Bhakri
Shokian	Kidar Sharma	Premnath, Suraiya, Jeevan, Helen O'Brian, Nazira, Achala Sachdev	Costume Action Drama	Music: Jamal Sen Lyrics: Kidar Sharma
Shri Ganesh Janma	Jayant Desai	Trilok Kapoor, Nirupa Roy, Jeevan, Ulhas, Vasantrao Pahelwan, Tiwari	Religious	Music: Khemchand Prakash Lyrics: Bharat Vyas
Shri Vishnu Bhagwan	Raja Nene	Trilok Kapoor, Nirupa Roy, Usha Kiran, Jankidas	Religious	Music: Avinash Vyas Lyrics: Saraswati Kumar Deepak, Mukhram Sharma
Shrikrishna Satyabhama	Raja Paranjpe	Shahu Modak, Purnima, Anant Marathe, Vasantrao Pahelwan, Nimbalkar	Religious	Music: K. Bhole Lyrics: Mukhram Sharma
Simba	Mohammed Hussain	Bimla, Raja Salim, Krishna Kumari, Baburao, Sheikh, Habib	Action Adventure	Music: D. C. Dutta Lyrics: Farooq Qaisar, Indeevar (2)
Stage	Vijay Mhatre	Dev Anand, Ramola, Kuldip Kaur, Mubarak, Cuckoo, Sunder, Ram Singh, Raj Mehra	Social Drama	Music: Sardar Malik Lyrics: Sarshar Sailani
Tarana	Ram Daryani	Dilip Kumar, Madhubala, Shyama, Kumar, Jeevan, Gope, Gulab	Romantic Drama	Music: Anil Biswas Lyrics: D. N. Madhok, Kaif Irfani Prem Dhawan
Ustad Pedro	Tara Harish	Sheikh Mukhtar, Begum Para, Mukri, Shammi, Sapru, Agha	Action	Music: C. Ramchandra Lyrics: Raja Mehdi Ali Khan
