= List of Hindi films of 1949 =

A list of films produced by the Bollywood film industry based in Mumbai in 1949:

== Highest-grossing films ==
The eight highest-grossing films at the Indian box office in 1949:

Rank	Title	Gross collection
1	Barsaat	₹2 crore
2	Andaz	₹1.80 crore
3	Mahal	₹1.45 crore
4	Dillagi	₹1.10 crore
5	Shabnam	₹90 lakh
6	Bari Behen	₹85 lakh
7	Patanga	₹80 lakh
8	Dulari	₹70 lakh

== A-B ==
Title	Director	Cast	Genre	Notes
Aakhri Paigham a.k.a. The Last Message	Muzammil Khurshid	Muzamil, Shashikala, Prakash Gupta, Yakub Rizvi, Leela Chitnis, Sudha Malhotra, Niranjan Sharma	Social	Music: Abid Hussein Khan, Sushant Bannerji
Aeeye	Yakub	Yakub, Sulochana Chatterjee, Ashraf Khan, Sheela Naik, Masood, Jankidas	Social Family	Music: Shaukat Dehlvi Nashad; Lyrics: Nakhshab Jarachvi
Amar Kahani	Baij Sharma	P. Jairaj, Suraiya, Ranjana, Jagdish Mehta	Drama	Music: Husnlal Bhagatram; Lyrics: Rajendra Krishan
Andaz	Mehboob Khan	Raj Kapoor, Nargis, Dilip Kumar, Cuckoo, Murad	Social Family Romance	Music: Naushad; Lyrics: Majrooh Sultanpuri
Apna Desh	V. Shantaram	Keshavrao Date, Pushpa Hans, Sudha Apte, Chandrashekhar, Manmohan Krishna, Satish Vyas	Social	Music: Purushottam; Lyrics: Diwan Sharar, Mirza Ghalib
Aparadhi	Yeshwant Pethkar	Madhubala, Pran, Baburao Pendharkar, Ram Singh, Uma Dutt	Crime Drama	Music: Sudhir Phadke; Lyrics: Amar Varma
Bachke Rahena	Bhagwan	Bhagwan, Leela Gupte, Razia Vasantrao Pehalwan, Azim, Baburao Pehalwan	Action Comedy	Music: Anna Saheb; Lyrics: Ehsan Rizvi
Bari Behen	Ram Daryani	Geeta Bali, Suraiya, Pran, Ulhas Rehman	Family Drama	Music: Husnlal Bhagatram Lyrics: Qamar Jalalabadi, Rajendra Krishan
Balam	Homi Wadia	Suraiya, Masood, Nigar Sultana, Wasti, Agha, Jayant	Romantic Drama	Music: Husnlal Bhagatram; Lyrics: Qamar Jalalabadi
Banoo	G. M. Amla	Anil Kumar, Maya Devi, Agha, Shanti Madhok, Nishant, Raj Shekhar, Kashmira	Social	Music: Ramprasad; Lyrics: Kamil Rashid, Sagar Nizami
Bansariya	Ram Narayan Dave	Geeta Bali, Om Prakash, Kuldip Kaur, Randhir, Sofia, Gulab, Ram Singh,	Romance Family	Music: Husnlal Bhagatram; Lyrics: Mulkraj Bhakri
Barsaat	Raj Kapoor	Raj Kapoor, Nargis, Nimmi, Premnath, K. N. Singh, B. M. Vyas, Sushila Devi	Romance Drama	Music: Shankar Jaikishan; Lyrics: Hasrat Jaipuri, Shailendra, Ramesh Shastri: Hawa Mein Udta Jaye, Jalal Malihabadi: Mujhe Kisi Se Pyaar Ho Gaya
Bazaar	K. Amarnath	Shyam, Nigar Sultana, Yakub, Gope, Cuckoo Badri Prasad, Amir Banu	Social Family	Music: Shyam Sunder; Lyrics: Qamar Jalalabadi
Bedard	B. N. Chouhan	Majnu, Anand Tiwari, Brij Gopal, Sudharao, Shanta Kunwar	Social	Music: Ramprasad; Lyrics: A. G. Badar
Begunah	B. R. Mudnaney	Roop Kumari, Arvind Kumar, Shama, Habib, Kathana, Usha	Action	Music: Shyamoo, Hari Bhai; Lyrics: Ratan Piya
Bhakta Pundalik	Dhirubhai Desai	V. Mehrotra, C. J. Pandey, Kamlesh Thakar, Chunilal, Sushil Kumar, Sophia, Rani Premlata	Devotional	Music: Chitragupta; Lyrics: Avtar Visharad, C. S. Pandey
Bhedi Bungla	Bhagwan	Bhagwan, Leela Gupte, Inamdar, Mirajkar, Azim, Baburao Pehalwan	Mystery Action	Music: P. Ramakant; Lyrics: Ehsan Rizvi
Bhole Bhale	Bhagwan	Bhagwan, Leela Gupte, Inamdar, Mirajkar, Azim, Baburao Pehalwan	Action	Music: P. Ramakant
Bhole Piya	Jaswant Jhaveri	Bhagwan, Leela Gupte, Rafiqe, Ansari, Shanta Patel		Music: K.C. Varma
Bholi	Ram Daryani	Geeta Bali, Prem Adib, Nawab, Shashikala, Gope, Jeevan	Family Drama	Music: Pandit Gobindram; Lyrics: I. C. Kapoor
Bhul Bhulaiyan	Taimur Behramshah	Agha, Zeb Qureshi, Laila, Bhudo Advani, Rashid, Maruti, Kusum Thakur, Pesi Patel, Anwaribai	Social	Music: Bulo C. Rani; Lyrics: B. R. Sharma, Rajendra Krishan (1)
Bigde Dil	A. M. Khan	Bhagwan, Husn Ara, Kesari, Veena Kohli, Kathana, A. M. Khan	Action	Music: Master Ibrahim; Lyrics: Shyam Hindi
Billi	Nari Ghadiali	Fearless Nadia, John Cawas, Putli, Sheikh, Mithu Miyan	Action	Music: K. Narayan Rao; Lyrics: C. M. Hunar
Bombay	C. R. Bajaj	Suraiya Choudhary, Shashikala, Uday Kumar, Ram Singh, Sheela Naik, Bhudo Advani	Social	Music: Mushtaq Hussain; Lyrics: C. R. Bajaj, Kamalnayan

== C-J ==
Title	Director	Cast	Genre	Notes
Chaar Din	M. Sadiq	Shyam, Suraiya, Jayant, Om Prakash, Shyama, Cuckoo	Social	Music: Shyam Sundar; Lyrics: Shakeel Badayuni
Chakori	Ram Narayan Dave	Nalini Jaywant, Bharat Bhushan, Manorama, Cuckoo, Randhir	Social Family	Music: Hansraj Behl; Lyrics: Mulkraj Bhakri, Varma Malik
Chandni Raat	Mohammad Ehsan	Shyam, Naseem Banu, David, Cuckoo, Jilloo	Drama	Music: Naushad; Lyrics: Shakeel Badayuni
Chhota Bhai	Kartik Chattopadhyay	Mahendra Pal, Molina Devi, Shakoor, Asit Sen	Family Social	Music: Pankaj Mullick; Lyrics: Rajendra Krishan
Chilman	Changezi	Rehana, Shareef, Pritma, Hamid, Anwari	Family Social	Music: Hanuman Prasad; Lyrics: M. K. Chibbar, Pyarelal Santoshi
Dada	Harish	Shyam, Munawar Sultana Sheikh Mukhtar, Murad, Mukri, Cuckoo	Action Drama	Music: Nashad; Lyrics: Shewan Rizvi
Darogaji	Akhtar Hussain	Nargis, Jairaj, Neelam Mishra, Nisaar	Social Family	Music: Bulo C. Rani; Lyrics: Manohar Lal Khanna, Khawar Zaman
Dawlat	Sohrab Modi	Madhubala, Mahipal, Jankidas	Social Family	Music: Hanuman Prasad; Lyrics: Qamar Jalalabadi
Delhi Express	Balwant Bhatt	Fearless Nadia, Prakash, Shanta Patel, Bachoo, Shyam Sunder	Action Thriller	Music: Chitragupta; Lyrics: Shyam Hindi
Dhoom Dham	Rajaram	Agha, Baburao, Urvashi, Leela Mishra, Vasantrao Pehalwan	Action	Music: Traditional (Sufi Samaj); Lyrics: Karan Dewan, Aziz Kashmiri
Dhoomketu	Homi Wadia	Fearless Nadia, John Cawas, Sona Chatterji, Boman Shroff, Dalpat, Ram Singh, Raja Sandow, Habib	Action Crime Thriller	Music: A Karim; Rajjan, A Karim
Dil Ki Basti	Wahid Qureshi	Masood Khan, Nigar Sultana, Amar, Lalita Pawar, Tiwari, Urmila	Romance Drama	Music: Ghulam Mohammed; Lyrics: Shakeel Badayuni, Waheed Qureshi
Dil Ki Duniya	Mazhar Khan	Mazhar Khan, Munawwar Sultana, P. Jairaj, Geeta Bali, Madan Puri, Suraiya Choudhary, Agha, Jaswant	Romance Drama	Music: Gobind Ram; Lyrics: Zia Sarhadi
Dillagi	Abdul Rashid Kardar	Shyam, Suraiya, Sharda, Amar, Amir Bano, Shyam Kumar	Romantic Drama	Music: Naushad; Shakeel Badayuni
Dulari	Abdul Rashid Kardar	Shyam, Geeta Bali, Madhubala, Suresh, Jayant, Amar, Pratima Devi, Shyam Kumar		Mohammed Rafi song: Suhaani Raat Dhal Chuki. Music: Naushad; Shakeel Badayuni
Duniya	S. F. Hussain	Karan Dewan, Suraiya, Yakub, Shakila, Anwaribai, Bhudo Advani, Baby Zubaida, Jankidas	Social Drama	Music: C. Ramchandra; Lyrics: Arzoo Lakhnavi, Asad Bhopali, S. H. Bihari, Saraswati Kumar Deepak
Ek Teri Nishani	B. K. Sagar	Trilok Kapoor, Shyama, Meena, Ajmal, Urvashi, Maruti, I. S. Johar, Om Prakash, Cuckoo	Social	Music: Amarnath, Sardul Kwatra; Lyrics: Sarshar Sailani
Ek Thi Ladki	Roop K. Shorey	Motilal, Meena Shorey, Bharat Bhushan, Kuldip Kaur, I. S. Johar, Agha, Shakuntala, Mehraj	Action Comedy	Music: Vinod; Lyrics: Aziz Kashmiri
Flying Express	Nanubhai Vakil	Prakash, Indubala, Shiraj, Gulnar, Raj Kishore	Action	Music: Sardar Bir Singh; Lyrics: M. Fatehuddin
Garibi	Ramchandra Thakur	P. Jairaj, Nirupa Roy, Geeta Bali, Usha Kiran, Jawahar Kaul, P. Kailash, Ramesh Thakur	Social Drama	Music: Bulo C. Rani; Lyrics: Rajendra Krishan, Shewan Rizvi, B. R. Sharma
Gharana	S. Bhatia	Paro Devi, Iftekhar, Leela Kumari, Amina, Khatoon	Family	Music: M. Shafi; Lyrics: Baba Alam Siahposh, Behzad Lakhnavi
Ghar Ki Numaish	V. Panchotia	Meera Misra, Geeta Bose, Bikram Kapoor, Paresh Banerji, V. Panchotia, Tandon, Noorjahan	Family	Music: Pandit Harbans Lal and Moti Babu; Lyrics: Pandit Madhur
Girls' School	Amiya Chakravarty	Geeta Bali, Sohan, Shashikala, Sajjan, Mangla, Ram Singh, Vimla Vashistha	Social	Music: C. Ramchandra, Anil Biswas; Lyrics: Kavi Pradeep
Hamari Kismet	Nari Ghadiali	Shanta Patel, Prakash, Agha, Dalpat, Tuthi Munchi, Radha, Sheikh	Action	Music: Nisar Bazmi; Lyrics: Rajjan
Hamari Manzil	O. P. Dutta	Nirupa Roy, Prem Adib, Gope, Badri Prasad, Raj Mehra, Yashodhara Katju, Randhir, Niranjan Sharma	Social	Music: Husnlal Bhagatram; Lyrics: Rajendra Krishan, Qamar Jalalabadi
Imtihaan	Mohan Sinha	Surendra, Madhubala, Sajjan, Jugnu, Gulab, Madan Puri, Cuckoo, Rekha	Social Drama	Music: S. Pathak; Lyrics: Harikrishna Premi
Iran Ki Ek Raat	P.C. Barua	Jamuna Barua, S. D. Narang, Chandravati, Ghulam Mohammed, Ramesh Sinha	Costume	Music: Kamal Das Gupta; Lyrics: Mile Lakhnavi, Nosheer Rizvi, Sundar
Jagriti	Manohar Ghatwai	Mohana, Ravikant, Freni Shroff, Bhim, Lalita Rao, Omkar Devaskar, Manohar	Social	Music: K. Narayan Rao; Lyrics: Indeevar
Jal Tarang	Rajendra Sharma	Geeta Bali, Rehman, Shyama, Shashikala, Ram Singh, Rajan Haksar, Pesi Patel, Ramesh Thakur, Kesari, Uma Dutt	Social	Music: Husnlal Bhagatram; Lyrics: Pandit Sudarshan, Sarshar Sailani, Kaif Irfani, Lekhraj Bhakri
Janmapatri	K. P. Sahani	Zebunissa, Hameed, Sudha Rao, Pran, Vijay, Leela Gupte, Nazir Kashmiri, Kathana	Social	Music: Gulshan Sufi; Lyrics: Aziz Kashmiri
Jeet	Mohan Sinha	Dev Anand, Suraiya, Bhagwan, Suraiya Choudhary, Durga Khote, Kanhaiyalal, Madan Puri, Habib	Social	Music: Anil Biswas; Lyrics: Prem Dhawan
Jeete Raho	C. S. Krishna Kumar	Bhagwan, Leela Gupte, Vasantrao Pehalwan, Baburao Pehalwan, Inamdar, Mirajkar	Action	Music: M. V. Devdas; Lyrics: M. A. Sagar
Jeevan Saathi	M. D. Baig	Ajit, Sulochna Chatterjee, Mumtaz Ali, Jeevan, Badri Prasad, S. Nazir, Sudha Rao	Social	Music: S. Mohinder; Lyrics: Hamid Khumar
Jigar	Bhagwan	Bhagwan, Leela Gupte, Vasantrao Pehalwan, Baburao Pehalwan		Music: Annasaheb; Lyrics: Ehsan Rizvi
Jiyo Raja	Nari Ghadiali	Agha, Shanta Patel, Prakash, Azim, Mumtaz Ali	Action	Music: Nisar Bazmi; Lyrics: Rajjan
Joker	Balwant Bhatt	Bhagwan, Shyam Sunder, Kamal Rani, Shanta Dewan, Razia, Nadir	Action	Music: Chitragupta; Lyrics: Shyam Hindi

== K-R ==
Title	Director	Cast	Genre	Notes
Kamal	Surya Kumar	Surendra, Mohana, Madan Puri, Jeevan, Lalita Rao	Social	Music: S. D. Burman; Lyrics: Gopal Singh Nepali, Prem Dhawan, Raja Mehdi Ali Khan
Kaneez	Krishna Kumar	Shyam, Munawwar Sultana, Urmila Devi, Kuldip Kaur, Shyama, Jilloo, Tiwari, Cuckoo	Family Social	Music: Ghulam Haider and Hansraj Behl Lyrics: Hasrat Lucknavi, Sarshar Sailani, Shahir Ghaznavi, Harishchandra Akhtar. Background music was by O.P. Nayyar
Karwat	Prakash, B.R. Chopra (uncredited)	Bhagwan, Leela Gupte, Satish, Baburao Pehalwan, Vasantrao Pehalwan, Deepak, Ratanpriya, Anwaribai	Action	Music: Hansraj Behl; Lyrics: Saifuddin Saif, D. N. Madhok
Khush Raho	Harbans Singh	Bhagwan, Leela Gupte, Satish, Baburao Pehalwan, Vasantrao Pehalwan, Deepak, Ratanpriya, Anwaribai	Action	Music: S. D. Batish; Lyrics: Ehsan Rizvi
Kinara	Ambalal Dave	Geeta Bali, Sharda, Ram Singh, Madhusudan Acharya, S. Nazir, Kanta Kumari	Social	Music: M. Acharya; Lyrics: Neelkanth Tiwari
Laadli	J. P. Advani	P. Jairaj, Sulochana Chatterjee, Kuldip Kaur, David, Ramesh Sinha, Randhir, Narmada Shankar, Urvashi	Romantic Drama	Music: Anil Biswas; Lyrics: Nazim Panipati, S. H. Bihari, Chandra Shekhar Pandey
Lahore	M. L. Anand	Karan Dewan, Nargis, Pratima Devi, Om Prakash, Randhir, Ram Avtar, Gulab, Balakram	Social Drama Partition	Music: Shyam Sundar; Lyrics: Rajendra Krishan
Lekh	G. Rakesh	Motilal, Suraiya, Sitara Devi, Suraiya Choudhary, Anand Pal, Chaman Puri, Gajanan Jagirdar, Cuckoo	Social	Music: Krishna Dayal; Lyrics: Qamar Jalalabadi
Maa Ka Pyaar	Ram Daryani	Prem Adib, Sulochana Chatterjee, Ranjit Kumari, Manorama, Jeevan, Gope	Family	Music: Gobind Ram; Lyrics: I. C. Kapoor
Mahal	Kamal Amrohi	Ashok Kumar, Madhubala, Vijaylaxmi, Kumar, Kanu Roy, Sheela Naik, Leela Pandey, Neelam, Jagannath	Reincarnation Suspense Thriller	Music: Khemchand Prakash; Lyrics: Nakshab
Main Abla Nahin Hoon	Shantaram Athavale	Raja Paranjpe, Shanta Apte, Jaswant, Ashalata, Raja Nene, B. Apte	Social	Music: Shanta Apte
Maya Bazar	Datta Dharmadhikari	Shahu Modak, Durga Khote, Usha Marathe, Baby Shakuntala, Balakram, Kusum Deshpande	Mythology	Music: Sudhir Phadke; Lyrics: Mukhram Sharma
Maya Mahal	K. Talpade	John Cawas, Fearless Nadia, Dalpat, Sona Chatterjee, Anwaribai	Action Fantasy	Music: A. Karim; Lyrics: Mushtar Behzadi
Naach	Ravindra Dave	Shyam, Suraiya, Shyama, Kuldip Kaur, Om Prakash, Raj Mehra, Gulab, Shyam Kumar, Yashodhara Katju	Social Drama	Music: Husanlal Bhagatram; Lyrics: Mulkraj Bhakri, Sarshar Sailani, Nazim Panipati
Namoona	Hira Singh	Dev Anand, Kamini Kaushal, Kishore Sahu, Shyama, Madan Puri, Leela Chitnis, Cuckoo	Social Romance Drama	Music: C. Ramchandra; Lyrics: Nakshab Jarchvi, Pyarelal Santoshi
Nanand Bhojai	Ratibhai Punatkar	Nirupa Roy, Manhar Desai, Dulari, Babu Raje, Suryakant, Lata Bai, Chhagan	Family	Music: Bulo C. Rani; Lyrics: Saraswati Kumar Deepak
Narad Muni	Raman B. Desai	Purnima, Lata Bai, Babu Raje, Shanti Madhok, Suryakant, Pinakin Shah	Mythology	Music: Bulo C. Rani; Lyrics: Pandit Indra
Narasinha Avatar	Sohrab Modi	Mahipal, Shobhana Samarth, Laxman, Niranjan Sharma, Madan Mohan, Kanta Kumari, Tiwari, Hari Shivdasani	Mythology	Music: Vasant Desai; Lyrics: Narendra Sharma
Nazare	Pralhad Dutt	Agha, Shashikala, Shanti Modak, Satish, Ram Avtar, Anwaribai, Rajendra	Social	Music: Bulo C. Rani; Lyrics: Majrooh Sultanpuri, Rajendra Krishan
Neki Aur Badi	Kidar Sharma	Madhubala, Geeta Bali, Kidar Sharma, Pesi Patel, Uma Dutt, Nazira	Social	Music: Roshan; Lyrics: Kidar Sharma
Nisbat	Shamshuddin	Munawwar Sultana, Yakub, H. Prakash, Zebunissa, Sofia, Jilloo	Social	Music: Gobind Ram; Lyrics: Hasrat Jaipuri, Majrooh Sultanpuri, Behzad Lakhnavi
Nishan	S. S. Vasan	Ranjan, P. Bhanumati, Nagendra Rao, Maya Banerjee, B. S. Kalla, M. K. Radha, Narayan Rao	Costume Drama	Music: S. Rajeswara Rao; Lyrics: Pandit Indra
Paras	Anant Thakur	Kamini Kaushal, Rehman, Madhubala, Sapru, K. N. Singh, Sulochana Chatterjee, Murad Gope, Pratima Devi, Cuckoo, Amar, Ram Avtar	Romantic Drama	Music: Ghulam Mohammed; Lyrics: Shakeel Badayuni
Parda	A. G. Sooma	Amar, Rehana, Kusum Thakur, N. A. Ansari, Chand Burke, Shanti Madhok, Nazir Kashmiri	Social	Music: Sharmaji; Lyrics: Swami Ramanand Saraswati
Parivartan	N. R. Acharya	Motilal, Raj Kapoor, Anjali Devi, Moni Chatterjee, Rukmani Devi, Vasant Malini, Nand Kishore	Social	Music: Aziz Hindi, Madhav Lal; Lyrics: B. S. Madhup, Roopdas, Gulshan Jalalabadi
Patanga	H. S. Rawail	Shyam, Nigar Sultana, Yakub, Purnima, Shyama, Gope, Cuckoo, Ajit, Rajendranath, Raj Mehra, Ramesh Sinha	Romance Drama	Music: C. Ramchandra; Lyrics: Rajendra Krishan
Pyar Ki Raat	A. R. Zamindar	Bhagwan, Leela Gupte, Satish, Baburao Pehalwan, Vasantrao Pehalwan, Mirajkar, Bibi, Anwaribai	Action	Music: N. A. Jolagaonkar
Raat Ki Raani	Jagdish Sethi	Shyam, Munawwar Sultana, Sulochana Chatterjee, Madan Puri, Jagdish Sethi, Om Prakash, Chaman Puri		Music: Hansraj Behl; Lyrics: A. Shah, Arzoo Lakhnavi
Rakhi	Shanti Kumar	Karan Dewan, Kamini Kaushal, Gope, Pran, Kuldip Kaur, Yashodhara Katju	Family	Music: Husnlal Bhagatram; Lyrics: Sarshar Sailani
Ram Vivaha	Prem Adib	Shobhana Samarth, Prem Adib, Umakant, Ulhas, Yashodhara Katju, Shanta Kumar, Ram Avtar	Religious	Music: Shanker Rao Vyas; Lyrics: Moti, Ramesh Shastri
Rangila Rajasthan	Bharat Vyas	Bharat Bhushan, Gita Bose, Uma Dutt, Shakuntala, Saroj Borkar	Folk Legend	Music: S. K. Pal; Lyrics: Bharat Vyas
Rim-Jhim	Ramesh Gupta, Sushil Sahu	Kishore Sahu, Ramola, Mohana, Mumtaz Ali, Mubarak, Amir Bano, Jankidas	Romantic Comedy	Music: Khemchand Prakash; Lyrics: Bharat Vyas, Moti
Roomal	Ramchandra Thakur	P. Jairaj, Nargis, Rehman, Cuckoo, Badri Prasad, Jeevan, Majnu, Jilloo	Social	Music: Hansraj Behl; Lyrics: Nazim Panipati, Mulkraj Bhakri
Rooplekha	Mohammed Hussain	Bhagwan, Shyama, Murad, Arvind Kumar, Elizer, Gulnar	Costume	Music: Khan Mastana; Lyrics: Khumar Barabankvi, Roolpekha
Roshni	Ramanlal Desai	Nihal, Rehana, Pran, Mumtaz Ali, Haroon, Chand Burke, V. H. Desai	Social Drama	Music: C. Ramchandra; Lyrics: Pyarelal Santoshi

== S-Z ==
Title	Director	Cast	Genre	Notes
Sampati	Amar Malik	Bharti Devi, Talat Mehmood, Hiralal, Sunder	Social Family	Music: Timir Baran; Lyrics: Pandit Bhushan
Sant Janabai	Govind Ghanekar	Hansa Wadkar, Balakram, Shakuntala, Gouri, Javdekar, Abhyankar	Devotional	Music: Sudhir Phadke; Lyrics: Narendra Sharma
Sanwariya	N. A. Mansuri	Rehman, Hafiz Jehan, Veera, Indu Paul, Leela Mishra, Shamim Akhtar, Shanti Madhok, S. L. Puri	Social	Music: C. Ramchandra; Lyrics: Pyarelal Santoshi
Sarojini	A. L. Ramesh	H. Prakash, Jyoti, Indu Paul, Shamim Akhtar, Shanti Madhok	Social	Music: Taalib
Sati Ahilya	Vasant Painter	Sapru, Kamla Kotnis, Ulhas, Minaxi, Shashi Kapoor, Balakram, Cuckoo	Devotional	Music: V. G. Bhatkar; Lyrics: Narendra Sharma
Sawan Aya Re	Kishore Sahu	Kishore Sahu, Ramola Mohana, David, Gulab, Ramesh Gupta, Pratima Devi, Anant Prabhu, Sofia	Social	Music: Khemchand Prakash; Lyrics: Bharat Vyas, Rammurti Chaturvedi
Sawan Bhado	Ravindra Dave	Munawwar Sultana, Raj Adib, Om Prakash, Indu Paul, Jankidas, Randhir, Anwaribai	Social	Music: Husnlal Bhagatram; Lyrics: Mulkraj Bhakri
Shabnam	B. Mitra	Dilip Kumar, Kamini Kaushal, Shyama, Mubarak, Jeevan, Cuckoo, Haroon, Rajendra Singh, Paro Devi	Romance Drama	Music: S. D. Burman; Lyrics: Qamar Jalalabadi
Shadi Ke Baad	Billu Mehra, Pran Mehra	Amarnath, Jyoti, Sunder, Tandon	Family Social	Music: K. P. Sen; Lyrics: Rangesh
Shair	M. S. Chawla	Dev Anand, Suraiya, Kamini Kaushal, Agha, Sulochana (Sr.), Shama Dulari, Murad, Kamlakant, Rekha (Rekha Mallick), Zia, Cuckoo	Romantic Drama	Music: Ghulam Mohammed; Lyrics: Shakeel Badayuni
Shohrat	K. Amarnath	Jayant, E. Billimoria, Sofia, Padma Bannerjee, Amir Bano	Social	Music: Aziz Hindi; Lyrics: Madhup Sharma
Singaar	J. K. Nanda	Suraiya, P. Jairaj, Madhubala, K. N. Singh, Durga Khote, Madan Puri, Randhir	Drama	Music: Khurshid Anwar; Lyrics: Shakeel Badayuni D. N. Madhok, Nakshab Jarchvi
Sipahiya	Aspi Irani	Madhubala, Yakub, Altaf, Agha, Kanhaiyalal, Ghulam Rasool, Amirbai Karnataki, Husn Banu, Jilloo	Romance Drama	Music: C. Ramchandra; Lyrics: Rajinder Krishan, Arzoo Lucknavi, Rammurti Chaturvedi
Sudhar	Batuk Bhatt	Yakub, Madhurika Arun Kumar Ahuja, Gope, Agha, Nirmala Devi	Social	Music: Lachiram Thomar; Lyrics: Pandit Indra
Sunehre Din	Satish Nigam	Raj Kapoor, Rehana, Nigar Sultana, Roop Kamal, Kamlakant, Haroon, Hira Sawant, Ramesh, Sinha	Romantic Drama	Music: Gyan Dutt; Lyrics: D. N. Madhok
Swayam-Siddha	Shyam Dass	Amarnath, Shanta Apte, Molina, Samar Roy, Bipin Gupta, Hiralal	Social	Music: Praful Choudhary; Lyrics: B. P. Mishra
Tara	R. D. Pareenja	Shyama, Amarnath, Jawahar Kaul, Kuldip Kaur, Majnu, Nayantara, Chand Burke	Social	Music Vinod; Lyrics: Aziz Kashmiri
Saheed e azam bhagat singh	Ganesh Acharya (Sudesh)	Sudesh, Amarnath, Jawahar Kaul, Kuldip Kaur, Majnu, Nayantara, Chand Burke	Social	Music: lachiram thomar Lyrics: jagdish gotam
Thes	Kidar Sharma	Bharat Bhushan, Purnima, Shashikala, Gyani, Maruti, Kamal Mehra	Social Romance	Music: Snehal Bhatkar; Lyrics: Kidar Sharma
Udhaar	S. S. Kulkarni	Munawwar Sultana, Dev Anand, Nirupa Roy, Bharat Bhushan Narmada Shanker, Salvi, Ram Singh	Social	Music: Vasant Desai; Lyrics: Narendra Sharma
Veer Ghatotkach		Shahu Modak, Meena Kumari, Amarnath, Sumati Gupta, Sona Chatterjee, Vasantrao Pehalwan, Niranjan Sharma, S. N. Tripathi	Mythology	Music: S. N. Tripathi; Lyrics: Moti, Ramesh Joshi, Anjum Rehmani
Vikram Shashikala	D. K. Rane	Master Vithal, Monica Desai, Shobha, Indumati	Legend	Music: Dattaram Gadekar; Lyrics: Dukhi Amritsari
Zevaraat	Habib Sarhadi	Masood, Meena, Yakub, Jayant, Shanta Pawar	Social	Music: Hansraj Behl; Lyrics: Habib Sarhadi

There is also unreleased movies called Vashishta Warwadevi(1949) and Main kaali pili nachaniya(1949) and not many details are available for them
