= Qamar Jalalabadi =

Indian poet and lyricist (1917-2003)

- Born: Om Prakash Bhandari; March 9, 1917; Jalalabad, Amritsar, British India
- Died: January 9, 2003 (aged 85); Mumbai, India
- Occupations: Poet; Film Lyricist; Film Screenwriter; Film Story Writer; Film Dialogue Writer
- Years active: 1942 – 1994
- Spouse: Leelawati
- Children: 7
- Website: qamarjalalabadi.com

Om Prakash Bhandari (9 March 1917 – 9 January 2003), better known by nom-de-plume Qamar Jalalabadi, was an Indian poet and lyricist, story writer, screenwriter and dialogue writer of Hindi movies. He composed the title track of the popular television serial Vikram Aur Betaal.

== Early life ==
He was born as Om Prakash Bhandari in a Punjabi family on 9 March 1917 in Jalalabad, a village near Beas in Amritsar district, Punjab, India. Right from the age of seven, he started writing poetry in Urdu. There was no encouragement from home, but a wandering poet named Amar Chand Amar met him in his hometown and encouraged him to write, recognising his immense talent and potential. He also gave him the penname of Qamar which means moon, and Jalalabadi was added for his native town. It was the general trend in those days for writers to name themselves after the towns they hailed from. After completing his matriculation from Amritsar, he embarked on his journalistic career journey by writing for Lahore-based newspapers like Daily Milap, Daily Pratap, Nirala, Star Sahakar.

== Career ==
Attracted by the promise of a career in the film industry, Qamar Jalalabadi came to Pune in the early 1940s. In 1942, he wrote lyrics for his first film Zamindar which was a Pancholi Pictures production and the songs of this film were very well received, especially the song sung by Shamshad Begum "Duniya Me Garibon Ko Aaraam Nahi Milta", which also had a line or two written by writer and poet Behzad Lucknawi.

Subsequently, Jalalabadi relocated to Bombay, and worked there as a lyricist for nearly four decades. His songs were sung by many notable singers including S. D. Batish, Noor Jehan, G. M. Durrani, Zeenat Begum, Manju, Amirbai Karnataki, Mohammad Rafi, Talat Mahmood, Geeta Dutt, Suraiya, Mukesh, Manna Dey, Asha Bhosle, Kishore Kumar and Lata Mangeshkar. He worked with many popular composers including S. D. Burman and Sardar Malik.

Some of his memorable songs from his early include "Sunti Nahi Duniya Kabhi Fariyaad Kisi Ki" (Renuka, 1947) and the ghazal "Dil Kis Liye Rota Hai...Pyaar Ki Duniya Me, Aisa Hi Hota Hai" (sung by Naseem Banu for the film Mulaquat in 1947). The noted dancer Sitara Devi performed some of his songs in Chand (1944). Chand was one of the earliest of Qamarji's successful and memorable films. "Ik Dilke Tukde Hazaar Huye, Koi Yahan Gira Koi Wahan Gira..." in Pyar Ki Jeet (1948 film), reflected his own tragedies and philosophy of life. His brush with comedy was in Aansoo Aur Muskan with, " Guni Jano, Bhakt Jano..." sung by Kishore Kumar as an actor in the movie.

As a lyricist, Qamar Jalalabadi was very versatile. On one hand he wrote duets like "Sun Meri Saanwari Mujhko Kahin Tum Bhool Na Jaana..." sung by Lata Mangeshkar and Mohammed Rafi (film: Aansoo 1953) and on the other hand he penned comic relief songs like "Khush Hai Zamana Aaj Pehli Tarikh Hai" endured with full throttle gusto by Kishore Kumar (film: Pehli Tarikh-1954). This song turned into veritable anthem and was played on Radio Ceylon on the first of every month for decades.

The film Howrah Bridge (1958) skyrocketed his career as lyricist to unprecedented heights. Songs like "Mera Naam Chin Chin Chu" (Geeta Dutt) and "Aaiye Meherbaan, Baithiye Jaanejaan...." (Asha Bhosle) became highly popular.

In his long career span he worked for several film companies like Prabhat Film Company, Pancholi Pictures, Filmistan Ltd., Famous Pictures, Minerva Movietone, Prakash Pictures, Wadia Films Ltd., Filmkar Ltd., Sippy Films, N.C. Sippy Films, Shri Shakti Films, Mitra Productions and many more.

He was one of the founder members of prestigious organisations like Film Writers Association & IPRS in Mumbai. The music composers he worked with were: Ghulam Haider, G. Damle, Pandit Amarnath, Khemchand Prakash, Husnlal Bhagatram, S.D. Burman, Anil Biswas, Shyam Sunder, Sajjad Hussain, Master Krishnarao, C. Ramchandra, Madan Mohan, Sudhir Phadke, S.D. Batish, Sardar Malik, Ravi, Avinash Vyas and in the latter phase of his career with O. P. Nayyar, Kalyanji-Anandji, Sonik–Omi, Uttam Singh and Laxmikant–Pyarelal as well. Qamar Jalalabadi wrote song lyrics for about 156 films by writing a total of approximately 700 songs in his long career.

He was a poet (shayar) and read poetry at several mushairas all over India.

== Personal life ==
In his personal life, Jalalabadi was a highly religious person and he chanted excerpts from the Bhagavad Gita, the Koran as well as the Bible. He was deeply into transcendental meditation, and was mostly embedded in his writing for most part of the day. He once gifted a bungalow in Khar, Mumbai to one of his married sisters to save her from a difficult marriage, and shifted to simpler accommodation in Juhu with his own family. He and his wife Leelawati had seven children.

He had several friends and hundreds of fans whom he called his "pankhe". His fan mail came in various languages; Hindi, English, Urdu and many regional languages as well. He replied to all his fan mail and judiciously sent an autographed photo as well.

== Filmography ==
=== Story Writer ===
Year	Film	Notes
1963	Taj Mahal	

=== Producer ===
Year	Film	Notes
1950	Chhoti Bhabhi	Also Writer and sole Lyricist
1953	Ansoo	Also Writer and sole Lyricist

=== Writer (in general) ===
Year	Film	Co-writer(s) (if any)	Notes
1950	Chhoti Bhabhi	No	Also Producer and sole Lyricist
1951	Shabistan	No	Also sole Lyricist
1954	Shart	Inder Sen Johar and Nasir Hussain	
1965	Sikandar-E-Azam	No	
1977	Kacha Chor	No	Also sole Lyricist

=== Screenwriter ===
Year	Film	Co-writer (if any)	Notes
1955	Adl-E-Jehangir	No	Also Dialogue writer and sole Lyricist
1959	Ujala	No	
1960	Singapore	No	
1963	Meri Surat Teri Ankhen	Phani Majumdar	
1963	Taj Mahal	No	
1974	Jeevan Sangram	Gulzar	Also Co-dialogue Writer
1974	Thokar	No	

=== Dialogue Writer ===
Year	Film	Co-writer(s) (if any)	Notes
1944	Chand	No	Debut film; Also sole Lyricist
1947	Aage Badho	Amar Varma	
1947	Mirza Sahiban	No	Also Lyricist
1948	Lakhpati	No	Also sole Lyricist
1948	Shaheed	Ramesh Saigal	Also Lyricist
1949	Bari Behen	Rajendra Singh Bedi and Rajendra Krishan	Also Lyricist
1949	Bazar	No	Also sole Lyricist
1949	Lekh	No	Also Lyricist
1949	Shabnam	No	Also sole Lyricist
1950	Samadhi	No	
1954	Pehali Tarikh	No	Also sole Lyricist
1955	Adl-E-Jehangir	No	Also Screenwriter and sole Lyricist
1955	Munimji	Nasir Hussain	
1956	Durgesh Nandini	No	
1957	Changez Khan	No	Also Lyricist
1957	Laxmi	No	Also sole Lyricist
1958	Phagun	No	Also sole Lyricist
1960	Basant	No	Also Lyricist
1961	Maya	No	
1962	Hariyali Aur Rasta	No	
1963	Rustam Sohrab	Masood Mashhadi, Jagdish Gautam, Sardar Ilham and Iqbal Nadeem	Also Lyricist
1967	Lamboo In Hong Kong	No	Also sole Lyricist
1968	Pyas alias Apna Ghar Apni Kahani	No	Also sole Lyricist
1970	Holi Aaee Re	No	Also Lyricist
1971	Banphool	No	
1972	Tanhaai	No	
1973	Bandhe Haath	No	
1974	Jeevan Sangram	Gulzar	
1974	Maa Bahen Aur Biwee	No	Also Lyricist; It appears that the film was banned but eventually released in 1974. The film's audio records were issued in 1972.
1974	Thokar	No	
1977	Gyaani Ji	No	Also Lyricist
1977	Paapi	No	It appears that this film was in the making for a long time. Some versions of its audio records were first released in 1975.
1979	Badmaashon Ka Badmaash	Roshan Lal Bhardwaj	
1979	Teen Eekay	No	The audio records of this film were issued in 1978 but the film was released in 1979.

=== Lyricist ===
Year	Film	Songs written	Music Director(s)	Notes
1942	Zamindar		Ghulam Haider	Debut film; Also Dialogue Writer
1943	Pagli		Jhande Khan, Govind Ram, Amir Ali and Rasheed Attre (all jointly in 1 song and separately in rest)	
1943	Sahara		Govind Ram	
1944	Chand		Husnlal-Bhagatram	
1944	Ramshastri		Ganesh Damle	
1945	Kaise Kahoon		Amarnath	
1945	Lakharani		Krishna Rao	
1946	8 Days		Sachin Dev Burman	
1946	Gokul		Sudhir Phadke	
1946	Nargis		Husnlal-Bhagatram	
1947	Heera		Husnlal-Bhagatram	
1947	Leela		Ramchandra Narhar Chitalkar	
1947	Mahasati Tulsi Vrunda		Ram Ganguly	
1947	Mera Suhag		Khemchand Prakash	
1947	Mirza Sahiban		Husnlal-Bhagatram	Also Dialogue Writer
1947	Mitti		Paigankar Ramakant	
1947	Mulaqat		Khemchand Prakash	
1947	Mohan		Husnlal-Bhagatram	
1947	Renuka		Sardar Malik	
1947	Sajan		Ramchandra Narhar Chitalkar	
1947	Samaj Ko Badal Dalo		Khemchand Prakash	
1947	Sindoor		Khemchand Prakash	
1948	Lakhpati		Husnlal-Bhagatram	Also Dialogue Writer
1948	Mera Munna		Ramchandra Narhar Chitalkar	
1948	Pyar Ki Jeet		Husnlal-Bhagatram	
1948	Shaheed		Ghulam Haider	Also Co-dialogue Writer
1949	Bari Behen		Husnlal-Bhagatram	Also Co-dialogue Writer
1949	Balam		Husnlal-Bhagatram	
1949	Bazar		Shyam Sunder Gaba and Husnlal-Bhagatram (separately)	Also Dialogue Writer; The film's opening credits listed both Shyam Sunder Gaba and Husnlal - Bhagatram as music directors. However, the Hindi Film Geet Kosh credits only Shyam Sunder for the film's songs.
1949	Dawlat		Hanuman Prasad	
1949	Hamari Manzil		Husnlal-Bhagatram	
1949	Lekh		Krishna Dayal	Also Dialogue Writer
1949	Shabnam		Sachin Dev Burman	Also Dialogue Writer
1950	Chhoti Bhabhi		Husnlal-Bhagatram	Also Producer and Writer
1950	Gauna		Husnlal-Bhagatram	
1950	Kisi Ki Yad		Hansraj Behl	
1950	Meena Bazar		Husnlal-Bhagatram	
1951	Sanam		Husnlal-Bhagatram	
1951	Sarkar		Govind Ram	
1951	Shabistan		Ramchandra Narhar Chitalkar and Madan Mohan Kohli (separately)	Also Writer (in general); The music for this film was originally supposed to be composed by C. Ramchandra. Due to a dispute with the producers, he left the film after recording a few songs. Madan Mohan was then brought in to compose its remaining songs.
1952	Anjam		Madan Mohan Kohli	
1952	Jalpari		Govind Ram	
1952	Raja Harishchandra		Husnlal-Bhagatram	
1953	Ansoo		Husnlal-Bhagatram	
1953	Farmaish		Husnlal-Bhagatram	
1953	Mashuqa		Roshan Lal Nagrath	
1954	Pehali Tarikh		Sudhir Phadke	Also Dialogue Writer
1954	Waris		Anil Krishna Biswas	
1955	Abe-Hayat		Sardar Malik	
1955	Adl-E-Jehangir		Husnlal-Bhagatram	Also Screenwriter and Dialogue Writer
1955	Marine Drive		Dattaram Baburao Naik	
1955	Shri Naqad Narayan		Vinod	
1956	Aan Baan		Husnlal-Bhagatram	
1956	Kya Baat Hai		Husnlal-Bhagatram	
1956	Rajdhani		Hansraj Behl	
1957	Chamak Chandni		Sardar Malik	
1957	Changez Khan		Hansraj Behl	Also Dialogue Writer
1957	Jalti Nishani		Anil Krishna Biswas	
1957	Krishna Sudama		Husnlal-Bhagatram	
1957	Laxmi		Avinash Anandrai Vyas	Also Dialogue Writer
1957	Mai Baap		Omkar Prasad Nayyar	
1957	Miss Bombay		Hansraj Behl	
1957	Zamana		Anil Krishna Biswas	
1958	Farishta		Omkar Prasad Nayyar	
1958	Gouri Shankar		Shivram Krishna	
1958	Great Show Of India		Avinash Anandrai Vyas	
1958	Howrah Bridge		Omkar Prasad Nayyar	
1958	Jang Bahadur		Avinash Anandrai Vyas	
1958	Phagun		Omkar Prasad Nayyar	Also Dialogue Writer
1958	Raagini		Omkar Prasad Nayyar	
1958	Sitamgar		G. Ramanathan and Baldev Nath Bali	
1959	Chand Ki Dunia		Shiv Dayal Batish	This album was composed by Shiv Dayal Batish who used the pseudonym Nirmal Kumar on Lata Mangeshkar's suggestion.
1959	Do Ustad		Omkar Prasad Nayyar	
1959	Gokul Ka Chor		Sudhir Phadke	
1959	Pakshiraj		Shri Nath Tripathi	
1959	Saazish		Shiv Dayal Batish	
1959	Tipu Sultan		Shiv Dayal Batish	
1960	Basant		Omkar Prasad Nayyar	Also Dialogue Writer
1960	Chhalia		Kalyanji-Anandji	
1960	Kalpana		Omkar Prasad Nayyar	
1960	Mitti Mein Sona		Omkar Prasad Nayyar	
1960	Trunk Call		Ravi Shankar Sharma	
1961	Apsara		Husnlal-Bhagatram	
1961	Modern Girl		Ravi Shankar Sharma	
1961	Passport		Kalyanji-Anandji	
1961	Pyase Panchhi		Kalyanji-Anandji	
1961	Salaam Mem Saheb		Ravi Shankar Sharma	
1962	Hong Kong		Omkar Prasad Nayyar	
1962	Maya Jaal alias Jadugar		Shri Nath Tripathi	
1962	Naag Devta		Shri Nath Tripathi	
1962	Pyar Ki Jeet		Sudhir Phadke	
1963	Kahin Pyar Na Ho Jaye		Kalyanji-Anandji	
1963	Pyar Ka Bandhan		Ravi Shankar Sharma	
1963	Rustam Sohrab		Sajjad Hussain	Also Co-dialogue Writer
1963	Shaheed Bhagat Singh		Husnlal-Bhagatram	
1963	Shikari		Gurusharan Singh Kohli	
1963	Yeh Dil Kisko Doon ?		Iqbal Qureshi	
1964	Birju Ustad		Kalyanji-Anandji	
1965	Himalay Ki God Mein		Kalyanji-Anandji	
1965	Johar Mehmood In Goa		Kalyanji-Anandji	
1965	Rustom-E-Hind		Hansraj Behl	
1966	Chale Hain Sasural		C. Arjun	
1966	Hum Kahan Ja Rahe Hain		Basant Prakash and Dalpat Bharati (separately)	
1966	Preet Na Jane Reet		Kalyanji-Anandji	
1966	Sunehra Jaal		Hansraj Behl	
1967	Dil Ne Pukara		Kalyanji-Anandji	
1967	Johar In Bombay alias Aaj Ka Aladin		Usha Khanna	
1967	Lamboo In Hong Kong		C. Arjun	Also Dialogue Writer
1967	Mera Munna		Kalyanji-Anandji	
1967	Mera Naam Johar		Usha Khanna	
1967	Raaz		Kalyanji-Anandji	
1967	Upkar		Kalyanji-Anandji	
1968	Anjam		Ganesh Sharma	
1968	Haseena Maan Jaayegi		Kalyanji-Anandji	
1968	Payal Ki Jhankar		Ramchandra Narhar Chitalkar	
1968	Pyas alias Apna Ghar Apni Kahani		Dattaram Baburao Naik	Also Dialogue Writer
1968	Suhaag Raat		Kalyanji-Anandji	
1969	Mahua		Sonik-Omi	
1969	Mr. Murder		Sonik-Omi	
1969	Mujhe Seene Se Laga Lo		Hansraj Behl	
1969	Patthar Ka Khwab		Dattaram Baburao Naik	
1970	Aansoo Aur Muskan		Kalyanji-Anandji	
1970	Ghar Ghar Ki Kahani		Kalyanji-Anandji	
1970	Holi Aaee Re		Kalyanji-Anandji	Also Dialogue Writer
1970	Priya		Kalyanji-Anandji	
1970	Sachaa Jhutha		Kalyanji-Anandji	
1971	Johar Mehmood In Hong Kong		Kalyanji-Anandji	
1971	Joi Bangla Desh		Kalyanji-Anandji	
1971	Paras		Kalyanji-Anandji	
1972	Baharo Phool Barsao		Rajan-Pal	
1972	Ek Hasina Do Diwane		Kalyanji-Anandji	While the audio records of this film were issued in 1971, the film was released in 1972. It appears that in the theatrical release, the film's title was spelt differently than in the audio records - the word Haseena in the audio release was spelt Hasina in the theatrical release.
1972	Mehmil		Sonik-Omi	
1972	Samaanta		Nitin-Mangesh	
1973	Gharibi Hatao		Sharda Rajan Iyengar	This film got its title from the 1971 Lok Sabha campaign slogan of the Congress party under Indira Gandhi.
1974	Maa Bahen Aur Biwee		Sharda Rajan Iyengar	Also Dialogue Writer; It appears that the film was banned but eventually released in 1974. The film's audio records were issued in 1972.
1975	Apne Dushman		Kalyanji-Anandji	
1975	Ganga Ki Kasam		Sonik-Omi	
1976	Zamane Se Poochho		Sharda Rajan Iyengar	
1977	Gyaani Ji		Premnath Malhotra and Sardar Malik	Also Dialogue Writer
1977	Kacha Chor		Laxmikant-Pyarelal	Also Writer (in general)
1978	Hazaar Haath		Sharda Rajan Iyengar	
1981	Maila Aanchal		Sharda Rajan Iyengar	
1983	Painter Babu		Uttam-Jagdish	
1984	Amma		Rajkamal	This film was launched in 1980 and its music was released in 1984 but its theatrical release happened only in 1986.
1988	Waaris		Uttam-Jagdish	
1992	Mangni		Omkar Prasad Nayyar	
1992	Nishchaiy		Omkar Prasad Nayyar	
1994	Do Fantoosh		Hari-Arjun	
1994	Zid		Omkar Prasad Nayyar	Last release
