= Dinesh Kumar Prabhakar =

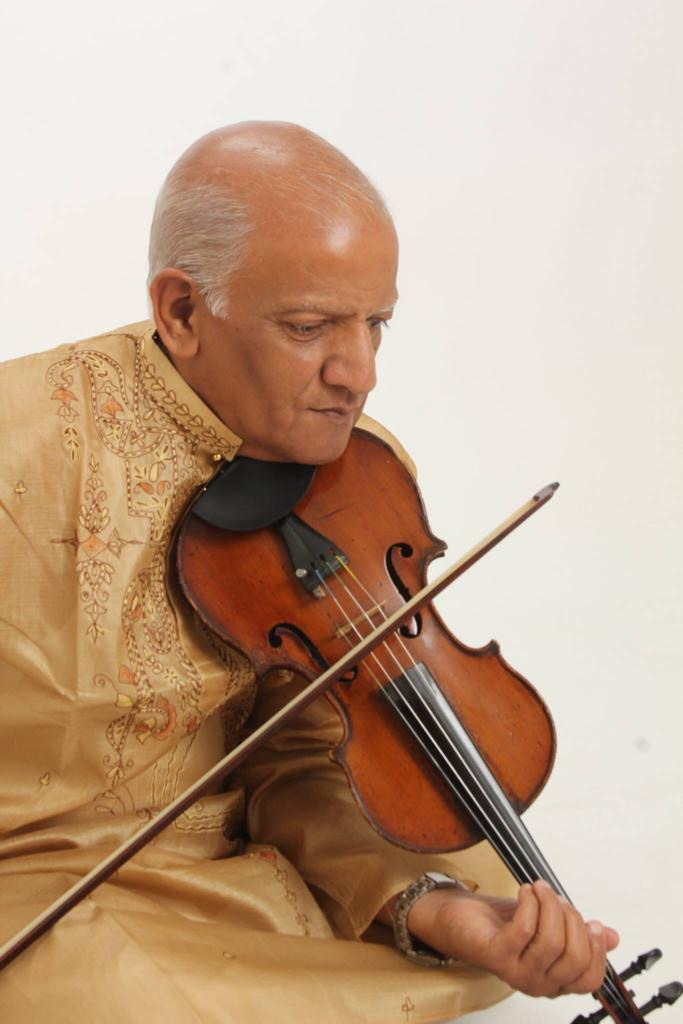
- Dinesh Kumar Prabhakar, 2019

Background information
- Born: June 3, 1950 (age 76); Mumbai (Bombay), India
- Occupations: violinist; composer; conductor and Vocalist
- Instruments: violin, vocals
- Website: Personal website

Dinesh Kumar Prabhakar (born June 3, 1950) is a violinist, composer, conductor and vocalist in Indian Classical Music. He has been behind many pieces of Indian music in the classical, national and religious genres. He has also composed and directed pop music.

== Childhood and Training ==
He started his training in music at the age of 8 years from his father, Late Pt. Husan Lal – a distinguished violinist, vocalist and music director. After his father’s death, he continued his training under the Government Of India’s Scholarship Scheme from Guru Pt. Dilip Chandra Vedi (who trained Pt. Husan Lal).

As a violinist Prabhakar has been the recipient of several national and international awards. One of the first highlights of his career was when he received the prestigious All India Radio Award for the Best Violinist in India, at the age of 18. He has composed and directed music for more than 300 documentaries, news magazines and animation films. He also has directed documentaries and films such as Ustad Bismillah Khan, a film on the renowned Shehnai Exponent and Bharat Ratna Awardee, and Moments with Maestros, that showcased films made on great maestros of music and his interactions with them. The film was subsequently screened during the inaugural ceremony of Dancing Feet, held at IFFI 2010, Goa.

Prabhakar gives performances of Indian classical music and devotional music. He also composes for music albums, documentaries and provides music for jingles, and advertisements. He works with recording studios and also with personal and private music labels.

== Career ==
Over the years, Mr. Dinesh Kumar Prabhakar’s performance expanded in repertoire to include musical compositions. He is credited with musical performances in India and abroad. His performances in Japan, Singapore, Bangkok, Nepal, back home at Vishnu Digambar Jayanti (Delhi), Hariballabh Sangeet Sammelan (Jalandhar, Punjab), Holi Festival (Amritsar), Basant Festival (Hoshiarpur) and Tansen Sangeet Samaroh (Delhi) created memorable events. As his fame as an artist grew, Mr. Prabhakar gradually got recognized in the world of music, as once his father was. Recently he has given Violin performances at Satguru Jagjit Singh Memorial Concert and Indian Consulate in New York City. Over the years, Mr. Prabhakar dreamed of imparting the training of classical music at international level.

The Musician’s Guild released his Violin Audio CD containing Raag Yaman and Miyaan Ki Malhar He has also had the honor of composing an orchestral composition, “Tribhava”, played at the inauguration of National Channel for All India Radio (A.I.R.) in India.

He was invited by the (then) USSR Embassy, Department of Culture, to compose and conduct orchestral compositions for a music concert held to mark the visit of the Indian Prime Minister, Late Shri Rajiv Gandhi to the USSR. The song, “WE ARE NATIONS OF COMMONWEALTH” composed by Mr. Prabhakar and sung by Shri A. Hariharan was adjudged second in the Asian Region by the Commonwealth Foundation of U.K. in 1993.

In his 40+ Years of experience as a musician, Mr. Prabhakar rendered his services for 20 years to All India Radio in New Delhi. He composed songs, Orchestral compositions, Musical features and received Akashvani Annual Awards for five consecutive years as the Best Music Director for composing musical features. During his tenure as “Director of Music” in the Films Division, Bombay (now Mumbai), for almost 20 years, he directed and composed music for more than 300 Documentaries, News Magazines, Featurettes and Animation films. Several of his films received National and International Awards. He composed the music for the film “The Assassination of Rajiv Gandhi” that won The National Award. He represented the Films Division to receive the award. He has composed songs with great playback singers such as Vani Jayaram, Yasudas, Asha Bhonsle, Anuradha Paudwal, Alka Yagnik, Udit Narayan, Kavita Krishnamurthy, Bhupinder Singh, Sadhna Sargam, Sudesh Bhosle, Sonu Nigam, Anup Jalota and A. Hariharan to name a few, for several documentaries for the Films Division of India. He also composed music for T-Series, Sadhu Vaswani Noori Pukar.

== Currently Doing ==
Mr. Dinesh Kumar Prabhakar is currently providing services in NY, promoting Indian music and culture to the youth.

== Music Composition ==
- His song ‘We Are Nations of Commonwealth’, sung by Shri A. Hariharan, was selected as the India nominee. It was adjudged Second in the Asian Region by the Commonwealth Foundation, UK in 1993
- He has composed Vadya Vrinda (Orchestra)
- Provided music for a very popular serial Doosra-Kewal cast by world famous hindi actor – Shahrukh Khan
- The version recording of Shehansha and Lata Volume 8 was also performed by him under the banner of Super Cassettes (now T-Series)
- Composed music for Noorie Pukar, an album of Sindhi Bhajans, written by Dada T. L. Vaswani
- Composed music for an Oriya Ballet Pranay Ballari, that was highly acclaimed by both audiences and the media elite
- Sung Sanskrit verses (Shloka) of the TV serial Meghdootam.
- Composes music for personal and private albums and for recording studios A

== Filmography ==
During his services with the Films Division, Mr. Prabhakar has also Directed several films such as

- “Shat-Shat Pranaam” – a film on the Independence Movement of India
- Composed and Directed 9 films on ‘Communal Harmony and National Integration’, in different Indian languages
- The “Eye of Friendship” (showing the glimpses of MIFF between the years 1990-2008). The film was screened at 11th edition of the Mumbai International Festival for Documentary, Short & Animation Films
- Directed the film “Moments with Maestros”, which showcased films that recognized great maestros of music and interactions with them. The film was subsequently screened during the inaugural ceremony of Dancing Feet, held at IFFI 2010, Goa.
- “Naushad – A Musical Journey”, a film that he directed, was screened at the Homage Section of IFFI 2006, Goa and MIFF 2010, Mumbai
- Directed film “Ustad Bismillah Khan”, a film on the renowned Shehnai Exponent and Bharat Ratna Awardee

Mr. Prabhakar had also given his contribution to MIFF (Mumbai India International Festival – Goa) as a member secretary for several years.
