= Pyar Ki Jeet (1948 film) =

1948 film

- Directed by: O. P. Dutta
- Written by: O. P. Dutta
- Story by: O. P. Dutta
- Produced by: Famous Pictures
- Starring: Suraiya; Rehman; Gope; Manorama
- Music by: Husnlal Bhagatram
- Distributed by: Famous Pictures
- Release date: 1948
- Country: India
- Language: Hindi

Pyar Ki Jeet (Love's Victory) is a 1948 Indian Bollywood film. It was the third highest grossing Indian film of 1948.

The film was directed by O. P. Dutta for Famous Pictures. It had music composed by Husnlal Bhagatram. The film starred Suraiya, Rehman, Gope, Raj Mehra, Manorama, Leela Mishra, Yashodhara Katju and Niranjan Sharma. Iss Dil ke Tukde Hazar hue, sung by Mohammed Rafi is still popular.

== Cast ==
- Suraiyaas the lead actress
- Rehman as Hero
- Gope as Comedian
- Raj Mehra as Supporting actor
- Manorama
- Gyani
- Leela Misra
- Yashodhara Katju
- Niranjan Sharma as Supporting actor
- Manmohan as Supporting actor

== Soundtrack ==
The music was composed by Husnlal Bhagatram and the film song lyricists were Qamar Jalalabadi and Rajinder Krishan.

No.	Song	Singers	Lyrics
1	"Ek Dil Ke Tukde Hazar Huye"	Mohammed Rafi	Qamar Jalalabadi
2	"Han Main Apne Dil Ke Haathon"	Surinder Kaur, Ram Kamlani	Rajendra Krishan
3	"Itne Door Hain Huzoor Kaise Mulaqat"	Surinder Kaur	Qamar Jalalabadi
4	"Kabhi Panghat Pai Aaja"	Suraiya, Meena Kapoor, Surinder Kaur	Rajendra Krishan
5	"Na Tadapne Ki Ijazat Hai"	Suraiya	Qamar Jalalabadi
6	"O Door Janewale"	Suraiya	Qamar Jalalabadi
7	"Rut Rangili Hai Suhani Raat Hai"	Suraiya, Meena Kapoor, Surinder Kaur	Rajendra Krishan
8	"Tere Nainon Ne Chori Kiya"	Suraiya	Rajendra Krishan
