= Adl-E-Jehangir =

1955 film by G. P. Sippy

- Showcard of film Adl-e-Jehangir
- Directed by: G.P. Sippy
- Written by: Lyricist: Qamar Jalalabadi
- Starring: Pradeep Kumar; Meena Kumari; Darpan
- Music by: Husnlal Bhagatram
- Production company: G.P. Productions
- Release date: 1955
- Running time: 150 minutes
- Country: India
- Language: Hindi

Adl-E-Jehangir (The Justice of Jehangir) also referred to as Adil-E-Jehangir, is a 1955 black and white Bollywood Hindi language historical drama film directed by G. P. Sippy. According to Sippy in an interview, it was the first film he directed, and it became a commercial success at the box office. The film had music composed by Husnlal Bhagatram, assisted by Shukla, with lyrics by Qamar Jalalabadi. A popular ghazal from the film was "Ae Meri Zindagi Tujhe Dhundhoon Kahan" sung by Talat Mahmood. The film starred Pradeep Kumar, Meena Kumari, Durga Khote, Sapru and Jankidas. Darpan, a leading Pakistani actor, also performed in the movie. He played the role of Prince Khurram (Shah Jahan).

The story involved a quasi-historical episode from Emperor Jehangir's reign where his sense of justice is brought into question when his wife, the Empress Noor Jehan is implicated by Rami, a washer woman, in the killing of her husband.

== Plot ==
Emperor Jehangir is known all over India for his sense of justice, and loved by the public for that. Empress Noor Jehan goes on a hunt and accidentally shoots dead a washer man with her arrow. His widow, Rami Dhoban, comes to the palace and rings the bell of justice. When Jehangir learns that Rami demands his justice of "a life for a life", he puts himself forward to be killed by Rami. Eventually the episode is sorted out through his ministers, with Rami forgiving the Empress and her husband.

== Cast ==
- Pradeep Kumar as Shiraz
- Meena Kumari as Zareena
- D. K. Sapru as Jehangir
- Durga Khote as Malika-E-Jehangir
- Mehmood
- Vinod Mehra as Young Khurram
- Janki Dass M.A. as Banka Khan
- Rajan Kapoor as Hgmat Khan {Zareena father)
- Darpan as Prince Khurram (Shah Jahan)

== Soundtrack ==
The music direction was by Husnlal Bhagatram, who used the voices of Lata Mangeshkar and Talat Mahmood as playback singers for the songs. The lyricist was Qamar Jalalabadi. Talat's songs were picturised on Pradeep Kumar, with Lata giving the vocals for Meena Kumari. One of the songs was sung by Asha Bhosle.

=== Song list ===
Song	Singer
"Aaj Laila Ko Majnu Ka"	Lata Mangeshkar
"Nazar Lagi Pyari"	Lata Mangeshkar
"Ae Meri Zindagi"	Lata Mangeshkar
"Ae Meri Zindagi"	Talat Mahmood
"Chand Sitare"	Talat Mahmood
"Apna Hi Ghar Lootane"	Mohammed Rafi
"Teri Allah Kare Rakhwali"	Mohammed Rafi
"Bhool Na Jana Ulfat Karke"	Asha Bhosle

== Reception ==
As reported by G. P. Sippy in an interview, Adl-e-Jehangir, his directorial debut, was successful in "terms of money", "It brought us more than we had spent on it".
