= Amar Kahani =

1949 Indian film

- Directed by: Baij Sharma
- Produced by: S. Ranjit
- Starring: P. Jairaj; Suraiya; Ranjana
- Music by: Husnlal Bhagatram
- Production company: Kamal Kunj Chitra
- Release date: 1949
- Country: India
- Language: Hindi

Amar Kahani (Immortal Story) is a 1949 Hindi romantic drama film directed by Baij Sharma. It was produced under the Kamal Kunj Chitra banner. The music was composed by Husnlal Bhagatram, with lyrics by Rajendra Krishan. The film starred P. Jairaj, Suraiya, Ranjana and Jagdish Mehta. Amar Kahani was one of the many films Jairaj and Suraiya starred in together. The others were: Tamanna (1942), Singaar (1949), Rajput (1951, Resham (1952) and Kanchan (1955) (Amar Kahani re-released in a new form).

== Cast ==
- P. Jairaj
- Suraiya
- Ranjana
- Jagdish Mehta

== Soundtrack ==
The music direction was by Husnlal Bhagatram, with lyrics written by Rajendra Krishan. The singers were Suraiya and Geeta Dutt.

=== Song list ===
Song	Singer
"Diwali Ki Raat"	Suraiya
"Beete Hue Din Raat"	Suraiya
"Umangon Par Jawani"	Suraiya
"Yaad Aa Raha Hai Dil Ko"	Suraiya
"Ek Teri Nazar Ek Meri Nazar"	Suraiya
"Chhoti Si Ek Bagiya Mein"	Geeta Dutt
"Khushiyon Ka Zamana"	Geeta Dutt
"Mil Gaye Tum Jab"	Geeta Dutt
