= Meena Bazaar (film) =

1950 film

- Directed by: Ravindra Dave
- Starring: Nargis, Shyam, Kuldip Kaur
- Music by: Husnlal Bhagatram
- Release date: 1950
- Country: India
- Language: Hindi

Meena Bazaar is a 1950 Bollywood film directed by Ravindra Dave starring Nargis and Shyam.

== Cast ==
- Nargis
- Shyam
- Kuldip Kaur
- Gope
- Om Prakash

== Music ==
All the film song lyrics were by Qamar Jalalabadi and the music was by Husnlal Bhagatram.

1. "O Mahi O Dupatta Mera Dede" - Mohammed Rafi, Lata Mangeshkar
2. "Duniya Hai Barbaad Dil Ki" - Mohammed Rafi, Lata Mangeshkar
3. "Paas Aake Huye Ham Door" - Mohammed Rafi, Lata Mangeshkar
4. "Apna Bana Ke Chhod Nahi Jana" - Mohammed Rafi, Lata Mangeshkar
5. "Gareebon Ki Kismat Mein" - Mohammed Rafi
6. "Chod Diya Ghar Baar" - Mohammed Rafi, Shamshad Begum, Om Prakash
7. "Na Thamte Hain Aansoo" - Mohammed Rafi
8. "Are Dene Wale Yeh Kya Zindagee Dee" - Mohammed Rafi
9. "Gori Baahon Me Choodiyan" - Mohammed Rafi, Shamshad Begum
10. "Aaye Gori Chupke Se" - Mohammed Rafi, Lata Mangeshkar
11. "Le Lo Ji Maharaj" - Mohammed Rafi, Shamshad Begum
12. "Suno Buzurgon Ka Yeh Kehna" - Ram Kamlani
13. "Tujhe Barbaad Karna Tha" - Lata Mangeshkar
