= Bari Behen =

1949 film

Bari Behen बड़ी बहन
- Theatrical Poster
- Directed by: D. D. Kashyap
- Written by: Rajendra Krishan; Qamar Jalalabadi; Rajinder Singh Bedi
- Screenplay by: D. D. Kashyap
- Produced by: D. D. Kashyap
- Starring: Suraiya; Rehman; Ullhas; Geeta Bali; Pran
- Cinematography: Surendra Pai
- Edited by: Anant Apte
- Music by: Husnlal Bhagatram; Lyrics by Rajendra Krishan; Qamar Jalalabadi
- Distributed by: Famous Pictures Ltd.
- Release date: 8 April 1949
- Running time: 118 minutes
- Country: India
- Language: Hindi

Bari Behen (lit. 'Elder Sister') is a 1949 Hindi drama film directed, written and produced by D. D. Kashyap, starring Suraiya, Rehman, Ullhas and Pran. The film was remade in Sinhalese as Sujatha (1953).

== Plot ==
Shyama (Suraiya) gets a job as a servant so she can pay for her younger sister, Kiran's (Geeta Bali) education in the city. Kiran, though, is in love with a rogue, Ajit (Pran). Ajit makes Kiran splurge all the money Shyama sends her on them. Meanwhile, Shyama meets and falls in love with Shyam (Rehman), the son of the family she works for and who is a doctor who wants to treat the poor. With both of being ill-treated by the woman of the house, who is Shyam's step-mother, they decide to elope. However, Kiran comes to her, abandoned and pregnant. Shyama goes along with her without informing Shyam in order to find Ajit. They find Ajit, but he escapes from them. The two sisters then relocate to another town. Kiran has the child, Shyama works in another house, where in order to get Kiran settled with the young man of the house and to prove her to be without blemish, she takes it upon herself to claim to be the mother of the child. This causes further complications with Shyam, who has managed to trace her out and now believes that she has been unfaithful to him. Wallowing in grief, he falls ill. Finally, with the help of a kindly army colonel, also Ajit's uncle (Ulhas), all's well that ends well, with a repentant Ajit marrying Kiran and Shyama reunited with Shyam.

== Cast ==
- Suraiya as Shyama
- Rehman as Shyam
- Ullhas as Colonel
- Geeta Bali as Kiran
- Gulab
- Pran as Jeetu /Ajit
- Roop Kamal
- Niranjan Sharma as Amar Nath
- Baij Sharma
- Shanti Madhok
- Ram Avtar as Seth Amrit Lal
- Amar Kumar
- Gyani Sarang
- Mrs. Paul
- Papoo
- Baby Tabassum as Munni

== Soundtrack ==
Bari Behen

Studio album by Husnlal Bhagatram
- Released: 1 December 1949
- Genre: Feature film soundtrack
- Labels: EMI, Saregama

Music composed by Husnlal Bhagatram and lyrics by Rajendra Krishan & Qamar Jalalabadi.

Original Motion Picture
| Track | Song | Singer(s) | Lyric |
|---|---|---|---|
| 1 | "Ho Likhnewale Ne Likh Di" | Suraiya | Rajinder Krishna |
| 2 | "Bigdi Bananewale: | Suraiya | Qamar Jalalabadi |
| 3 | "Chup Chup Khade Ho, Zaroor Koi Baat Hai" | Lata Mangeshkar & Premlata | Rajindera Krishan |
| 4 | "Woh Paas Rahe Ya Door Rahe" | Suraiya | Qamar Jalalabadi |
| 5 | "Mohabbat Ke Dhoke Mein Koi Na Aaei" | Mohd. Rafi | Rajinder Krishan |
| 6 | "Jo Dil Mein Khushi Ban Kar Aai" | Lata Mangeshkar on the 78 rpm record, but Premlata on movie track | Rajinder Krishna |
| 7 | "Chale Jana Nahin" | Lata Mangeshkar on 78 rpm record but Premlata on movie track | Rajinder Krishan |
| 8 | "Tum Mujh Ko Bhool Jao" | Suraiya | Qamar Jalalabadi |

The song "Chale Jana Nahin" is set in raga Asavari.
