= Bazaar (1949 film) =

1949 film

- Directed by: K. Amarnath
- Written by: Qamar Jalalabadi
- Screenplay by: K. Amarnath
- Story by: K. Amarnath
- Produced by: M. R. Navalkar
- Starring: Shyam; Nigar Sultana; Yakub; Gope
- Cinematography: M. R. Navalkar
- Edited by: Vasant Borkar
- Music by: Shyam Sunder; Husnlal Bhagatram
- Production company: Madhukar Pictures
- Distributed by: Madhukar Pictures
- Release date: 1949
- Country: India
- Language: Hindi

Bazaar is an Indian Hindi language family-drama film of year 1949. The film is directed by K. Amarnath and produced under the banner Madhukar Pictures. The story was written by K. Amarnath, while the dialogue and lyrics were by Qamar Jalalabadi, with music by Shyam Sunder and Husnlal Bhagatram.

== Plot ==
An impecunious poet, Parwana, runs away from home in company with his pal Jaggu to join a theatrical company. On the way, they come across a gypsy camp and Jagu succeeds in picking up Koel, a gypsy dancer, as his sweetheart. Parwana and Jagu soon cross swords with Khanna of Khanna Theatres, whose main attraction is Bijli, a beautiful and temperamental dancer. Bijli is attracted by Parwana's poetry and physique and we soon see Parwana, Jagu and Koel working in Khanna Theatres.

Parwana and Bijli begin to love each other, and Khanna doesn't like the look of things, being himself in love with Bijli. Things soon reach a show-down stage and Bijli walks out of Khanna Theatres arm-in-arm with Parwana and his stooges. The new team tries to start its own theatre business, but the love-stricken Khanna becomes vindictive and with his influence and money hounds them out from place to place until Parwana and Bijli are ruined and heartbroken. In a desperate attempt to save Parwana's poetic soul, Bijli, sacrificing her love for him, compromises matters with Khanna, who helps to put Parwana on the stage once again. But, Parwana needs more than mere success to feel happy and very soon he returns heartbroken to his parental home, a sadder but wiser man.

Now Parwana dedicates himself to national service and we soon come to the climax, in which Khanna, realizing the intensity of Bijli's love for Parwana, gracefully gives her up and all rush to a public meeting for their individual professions and confessions. Evidently, anyplace seems to be good enough for the Punjabis to show their love and a large crowd does not deter Bijli from showing her love for Parwana on a public platform. It ends well.

== Cast ==
- Shyam
- Nigar Sultana
- Yakub
- Gope
- Cuckoo

== Music ==
The music of the film was composed by Shyam Sunder and Husnlal Bhagatram. Songs were sung by Mohammed Rafi and Lata Mangeshkar.

- Zara Sunn Lo Hum Apne Pyar Ka Afsana Kehte Hein
- "Ye Hai Duniya Ka Bazaar"
- "Shaheedo Tumko Mera Salaam"
- "Challa De Ja Nishanee"
- "O Jaanewale Chaand Zara Muskurake"
- "Pee Aaye Aa Kar Chal Bhi Diye"
- "Saajan Ki Galiyan Chhod Chale"
- "Aye Mohobbat Unse Milne Ka Bahana Ban Gaya"
- "Apni Nazar Se Dour Woh"
