= Mirza Sahiban (1947 film) =

1947 film directed by K. Amarnath

- Directed by: K. Amarnath
- Screenplay by: K. Amarnath; Qamar'jallalabadi; Aziz Kashmiri
- Story by: K. Amarnath
- Based on: Mirza Sahiban
- Produced by: M. R. Navalkar
- Starring: Nurjehan; Trilok Kapoor
- Cinematography: M. R. Navalkar
- Edited by: Vasant Borkar
- Music by: Pandit Amarnath and Husnlal-Bhagatram
- Production company: Famous Pictures Studio Ltd.
- Distributed by: Madhukar Pictures
- Release date: 1947
- Running time: 190 mins
- Country: India
- Language: Hindi

Mirza Sahiban is a 1947 Indian Hindi-language romantic drama film directed by K. Amarnath, starring Noor Jehan and Trilok Kapoor in the lead roles. It is based on the folktale of Mirza Sahiban and was the fourth highest grossing Indian film of 1947.

== Cast ==
- Noor Jehan as Sahiban
- Trilok Kapoor as Mirza
- Mishra as Choudhary Sahib
- Roop Kamal as Noora, Sahiban's friend
- Rekha as Chhati, Mirza's younger sister
- Ibrahim as Miyanji
- Laxman as young Mirza
- Baby Anwari as young Sahiban
- Amirbano as Mirza's widowed mother
- Gulab as Choudhary Sahib's wife
- Gope as Pumman

== Music ==
The music for the film was composed by Late Pandit Amarnath, with lyrics penned by Qamar Jalalabadi, Aziz Kashmiri. The soundtrack consists of eleven songs, featuring vocals by Noor Jehan, G. M. Durrani, Zohrabai Ambalewali, and Shamshad Begum. There was a dance by Cuckoo who played a wedding dancer in an uncredited role.

Songs List of Mirza Sahiban 1947
Song title	Singer(s)	Music director	Lyricist	Actor(s)/Actress(es)	Category
Kya Yehi Tera Pyar Tha	Noor Jehan	Pandit Amarnath, Husnlal Bhagatram	Qamar Jalalabadi	Noor Jehan	Sad Songs
Hath Sine Pe Jo Rakh Do To Qarar Aa Jaye	Noor Jehan, G. M. Durrani	Pandit Amarnath, Husnlal Bhagatram	Aziz Kashmiri	Trilok Kapoor, Noor Jehan, Gope	Romantic Songs
Aaja Tujhe Afsana Judai Ka Sunaoon	Noor Jehan	Pandit Amarnath, Husnlal Bhagatram	Qamar Jalalabadi	Noor Jehan	Sad Songs
Rut Rangili Aayi Chandni Chayi	Zohrabai Ambalewali, Noor Jehan, Shamshad Begum	Pandit Amarnath, Husnlal Bhagatram	Qamar Jalalabadi	Noor Jehan	
Suno Meri Sarkar Jawani Kya Kehti Hai	Zohrabai Ambalewali, Shamshad Begum	Pandit Amarnath, Husnlal Bhagatram	Aziz Kashmiri		Romantic songs
Saamane Gali Men Meraa Ghar Hai	Zohrabai Ambalewali	Pandit Amarnath, Husnlal Bhagatram	Aziz Kashmiri	Cuckoo, Gope	Dance songs
Aaj Miyanji Ko Chad Aaye Bukhar To Bada Maza Aaye	Shamshad Begum	Pandit Amarnath, Husnlal Bhagatram	Aziz Kashmiri	Baby Anwari, Laxman, Ibrahim	
Haye Re Ud Ud Jaye Mora Reshmi Dupattva	Shamshad Begum, Noor Jehan, Zohrabai Ambalewali	Pandit Amarnath, Husnlal Bhagatram	Qamar Jalalabadi	Noor Jehan, Roop Kamal	
Patra Likhan Walia	Shamshad Begum	Pandit Amarnath, Husnlal Bhagatram	Aziz Kashmiri	Baby Anwari, Laxman, Noor Jehan, Trilok Kapoor	Romantic Songs
Tum Aankhon Se Dur Ho	G. M. Durrani, Noor Jehan	Pandit Amarnath, Husnlal Bhagatram	Aziz Kashmiri	Trilok Kapoor, Noor Jehan	Sad Songs
Khaayegi Thokaren Ye Jawaani Kahaan Kahaan	G. M. Durrani	Pandit Amarnath, Husnlal Bhagatram	Qamar Jalalabadi	Trilok Kapoor	
