= Sushma =

- Gender: Female

Origin
- Meaning: "sparkling beauty" "beautiful women" "First ray of the sun"
- Region of origin: India, Nepal

Other names
- Alternative spelling: Shushma, Susma, Shusma

Sushma (Nepali: सुष्मा) is a female given name in India and Nepal. It means "sparkling beauty" or first ray of the sun or beautiful women.

Notable people with the name include:

- Sushma Jansari, British Indian historian and curator
- Sushma Joshi (born 1973), Nepali writer and filmmaker
- Sushma K. Rao, Indian television actress
- Sushma Karki, Nepali model and actress
- Sushma Rana, professional Indian shooter
- Sushama Reddy (born 1973), Indian model, VJ, actress and producer
- Sushma Seth, Indian film, television, and stage actress
- Sushma Shrestha (born c. 1960), Nepali singer
- Sushma Singh, Chief Information Commissioner of India
- Sushma Swaraj (born 1952), Indian politician
