= Dawlat (film) =

1949 film by Sohrab Modi

- Directed by: Sohrab Modi
- Story by: P. K. Atre
- Produced by: Minerva Movietone
- Starring: Madhubala; Mahipal; Jankidas
- Cinematography: Y. D. Sarpotdar
- Music by: Hanuman Prasad
- Release date: April 1, 1949
- Country: India
- Language: Hindi

Dawlat (transl. "Money") is a 1949 Indian comedy film directed by Sohrab Modi, produced by Minerva Movietone and starring Madhubala and Mahipal in lead roles. The music for the film was composed by Hanuman Prasad. It revolves around a young man trying to impress a rich father in order to marry his beautiful daughter.

Daulat was the first time Madhubala was cast in a lead role, but the film, which began filming in 1947, was not completed until 1949, by which a number of her films in starring roles had been already released. Released on 1 April 1949, Daulat failed commercially and received criticism for its direction and story. No print of the film is known to survive today, thereby making it a lost film.

== Plot ==
An old wealthy man (Jankidas), who lives with his wife and young and beautiful daughter Nirmala (Madhubala), does not allow any other man to enter his house. He thinks that Nirmala's beauty would attract the man. On the other hand, Nirmala has too many suitors, one of them being Suresh (Mahipal). She is in love with Suresh, and so is he. When meeting her father to ask for Nirmala's hand for marriage, he ends up creating a bad impression in front of him. The rest of the film revolves around how Suresh tries to please Nirmala's father, which leads to hilarious situations.

== Cast ==
- Madhubala as Nirmala
- Mahipal as Suresh
- Jankidas as Mr. Sinha
- Leela Mishra as Mrs. Sinha
- Ghulam Hussain

== Production ==
Daulat was the first time Madhubala was cast in a lead role in a film. Although she failed her auditions, she secured the role after director Sohrab Modi and Jankidas found her sobbing in a train to Mumbai. The filming began in 1947, but was not finished until April 1949. In the meantime, Madhubala acted in a number of films as the leading lady, including Kidar Sharma's Neel Kamal (1947) and K. B. Lall's Lal Dupatta (1948).

== Soundtrack ==
The music director was Hanuman Prasad and playback singing was given by Zohrabai Ambalewali, Shankardas Gupta and Lalita Deulkar.

#	Song	Singer
1	"Tum Ek Nazar Dekh Chule"	Zohrabai Ambalewali, Shankardas Gupta
2	"Hai Kahani Preet Ki"	Lalita Deulkar, Zohrabai Ambalwali
3	"Mohabbat Ki Sabha Mein"	
4	"Rangeeli Dulhan, Sharmeeli Dulhan"	
5	"Zara Pucho Pucho Shararat"	
6	"Dil Kha Kar Chot Judaai Ki"	Zohrabai Ambalewali
7	"Main Jaa Na Saku"	
8	"Prem Nagar Ke Governor"	
9	"Thandi Hawa Ka Jhokha Aaya"	Zohrabai Ambalewali

== Reception ==
Daulat was a commercial failure and badly received by critics. In filmindia's review, Baburao Patel titled it as "A Damn Idiotic Picture". Patel wrote, "The whole picture is a criminal waste of celluloid with everything from the story to direction down to acting being of third class standard." He said the Modi has a "crude and peculiar taste of comedy", and Madhubala is cast in a role in which she has "got nothing to do."
