= Chhoti Bhabhi =

Choti Bhabhi
- Directed by: Shanti Kumar
- Produced by: Filmkar Studio
- Starring: Nargis
- Music by: Husnlal Bhagatram
- Release date: 1950
- Country: India
- Language: Hindi

Chhoti Bhabhi is a 1950 Indian Hindi-language film directed by Shanti Kumar. It was produced under the banner of Filmkar Studio and starred Nargis.

The film was released in Bombay in August 1950, and was described as a "damp squib" in a Times of India review.
