= Cuckoo Moray =

Indian actress and dancer

- Born: 1928; British Raj
- Died: 30 September 1981 (aged 52–53); Mumbai, Maharashtra, India
- Occupations: Actress, dancer
- Years active: 1946–1963

Cuckoo Moray, also credited as Cuckoo or Cukoo (1928 – 30 September 1981), was an Anglo-Indian dancer and actress in Indian cinema. She is widely regarded as the first dance star of Hindi cinema and a pioneering figure in Bollywood's dance number culture. Active during the 1940s and 1950s, she was known as the "rubber girl" because of her tremendous flexibility and dancing ability, and commanded high fees for her performances. She was also the mentor of cabaret dancer Helen and helped pave her way into Bollywood.

== Early career ==
Born during the late British Raj, Cuckoo made her screen debut in the film Arab Ka Sitara in 1946. Soon after in Stum Chandi, directors and greater audiences noticed her dancing abilities for the first time. Then, the turning point in Cuckoo's career was in Mehboob Khan's films. Her dance number in his film Anokhi Ada (1948) established her as the lead dancer of the era and in Andaz (1949), a romantic drama starring Nargis, Dilip Kumar, and Raj Kapoor, gave the dancing star an opportunity to display her acting skills. In Mehboob Khan's 1952 technicolor film Aan, which was her first colour film, she had a brief cameo in a dance sequence. She only appeared in 2 colour films in her career Aan & Mayurpankh. She would charge Rs 6,000 for a dance number, an enviable fee in the 50s.

== Later life ==
Cuckoo remained the top dancer in Hindi films until dancers such as Helen and Vyjayanthimala came into the industry. Cuckoo was a family friend of the Anglo-Burmese dancer and actress Helen. She was also known for helping unknown actors get their break in Bollywood, such as Pran in Ziddi. Cuckoo had introduced a 13-year-old Helen into films as a chorus dancer in films such as Shabistan and Awaara (both 1951). Cuckoo and Helen most notably appeared in song and dance sequences together, such as in Chalti Ka Naam Gaadi (1958) and Yahudi (1958). Her last film appearance was in Mujhe Jeene Do in 1963 after which, she had disappeared from the film industry.

Cuckoo was fond of luxury and reportedly had three luxury cars, one was used by her, the other meant for her pet dog and the last one by Helen. She owned several apartments and a lot of jewelry but is said to have lost them for violating income tax rules. Because of this, she had no money left. As her fortunes dwindled, she battled terminal cancer, dying at the age of 52. Cuckoo died on 30 September 1981 due to cancer at the age of 53. At the last moment, the situation became such that the film industry left her in oblivion. There was no money even to buy medicines, due to which Cuckoo could not get herself treated and no one from the film industry came forward to help her. She was forgotten and unattended by the film industry at the time of her death.

It has been recently confirmed that Cuckoo's real name was Cuckoo Moray.

== Filmography ==
Year	Title	Role	Notes
1944	Mujrim	Dancer	Debut film and role
1946	Arab Ka Sitara	Dancer	
1946	Hum Ek Hain	Dancer	
1947	Aage Badho	Dancer	
1947	Do Bhai	Dancer	
1947	Mirza Saheban	Dancer	
1948	Anokhi Ada	Stage dancer	
1948	Chandralekha	Dancer	
1948	Ghar Ki Izzat	Dancer	
1948	Mela	Dancer	
1948	Vidya	Dancer	
1949	Andaz	Sheila	
1949	Barsaat	Ruby	
1949	Bazaar	Dancer	
1949	Dulari	Dancer	
1949	Ek Thi Larki	Dancer	
1949	Namoona	Dancer	
1949	Paras	Dancer	
1949	Patanga	Dancer	
1949	Shair	Flora alias Mohini	
1949	Singaar	Dancer	
1950	Arzoo	Dancer	
1950	Bebas	Dancer	
1950	Dilruba	Lachchhi	
1950	Hanste Aansoo	Dancer	
1950	Magroor	Dancer	
1950	Nirala	Dancer	
1950	Pardes	Dancer	
1950	Sargam	Dancer	
1951	Afsana	Dancer	
1951	Awāra	Bar Singer-Dancer	
1951	Bade Bhaiya	Dancer	
1951	Hulchul	Dancer	
1951	Sanam	Dancer	
1951	Tarana	Dancer	
1952	Aan	Dancer	Only colour film
1952	Anand Math	Dancer	
1952	Baiju Bawra	Dancer	
1952	Nau Bahar	Dancer	
1952	Sangdil	Dancer	
1953	Alif Laila	Dancer	
1953	Footpath	Dancer	
1953	Jhamela	Dancer	
1953	Laila Majnu	Dancer	
1953	Rail Ka Dibba	Dancer	
1953	Shole	Dancer	
1954	Alibaba Aur 40 Chor	Dancer	
1954	Amar	Dancer	
1954	Nastik	Dancer	
1954	Shart	Dancer	
1955	Azaad	Dancer	
1955	Devdas	Dancer	
1955	Marine Drive	Dancer	
1955	Mr. and Mrs. 55	Singer	
1955	Uran Khatola	Dancer	
1956	Basant Bahar	Dancer	
1956	C.I.D.	Dancer	
1956	Funtoosh	Dancer	
1956	Raj Hath	Dancer	
1957	Naya Daur	Dancer	
1957	Pyaasa	Dancer	
1957	Tumsa Nahin Dekha	Dancer	
1958	Chalti Ka Naam Gaadi	Dancer	
1958	Howrah Bridge	Dancer	
1958	Phagun	Dancer	
1958	Yahudi	Singer-Dancer	
1959	Bus Conductor	Dancer	
1959	Dil Deke Dekho	Dancer	
1959	Raja Malaya Simha	Dancer	
1959	Sujata	Rama's friend, Singer	
1960	Kala Bazar	Dancer	
1960	Singapore	Dancer	
1961	Jhumroo	Dancer	
1961	Passport	Dancer	
1962	Girls' Hostel	Dancer	
1963	Mujhe Jeene Do	Dancer	Final film
