= Sanam (1951 film) =

- Song synopsis booklet cover
- Directed by: Nandlal Jaswantlal
- Written by: Nilkantha Tiwari
- Story by: Mohanlal G. Dave
- Produced by: United Technicians
- Starring: Dev Anand; Suraiya; Meena Kumari; Gope
- Cinematography: Jal Mistry
- Edited by: Shankarlal Nayak
- Music by: Husnlal Bhagatram
- Production company: United Technicians
- Distributed by: United Technicians
- Release date: 1951
- Running time: 120 minutes
- Country: India
- Language: Hindi

Sanam is a 1951 Bollywood romantic film directed by Nandlal Jaswantlal, who also directed the classic Anarkali. It starred Dev Anand, and his co-star was Suraiya, who also recorded the playback singing for the film. Meena Kumari acted in the film in a supporting role, where she played the role of Suraiya's best friend. The film was an average at the box office, which was attributed to Suraiya's fading stardom in the early 1950s, and Madhubala's and Nargis' simultaneous rise as the top female stars.

== Story ==
Sanam is a romantic comedy, where Yogen (Dev Anand), a poor educated young man, who is unemployed, comes across Sadhana (Suraiya) and Rani (Meena Kumari) in a chance encounter in a book shop. He was there to request the shopkeeper for a job, which the latter turns down and shows him the door. While exiting, Yogen notices the handbag of Sadhna, absentmindedly left behind by her and returns it. She is impressed by his honesty, when he declines her offer of a large wad of currency notes as a reward. Sadhna couldn't forget Yogen and her respect for his honesty gradually turns into love. In the meanwhile, when he could not land a job, Yogen snatches fifty rupees from a wealthy trader for treatment of his ailing mother. Unfortunately, the trader is runover by an approaching motor-vehicle while Yogen was being pursued by him. Yogen is convicted for homicide and jailed, mainly due to the strong arguments put-forth by the Prosecution(Govt.) Counsel(K.N. Singh), who happens to be Sadhana's father. While going for hitch-hiking near the jail, where Yogen was incarcerated, unknowingly, Sadhna halts her motor-car nearby for a short while. It so happens that at the very same moment, Yogen escapes from jail and hid in the vehicle to evade the pursuing guards. Sadhna and Rani recognize him and bring him along. They hide him at their home as otherwise he would have been rearrested. Sadhna's feelings for Yogen are rekindled and she becomes besotted with him following the incident of Yogen rescuing her from an accidental fire, where she and her friends were staging a play for the benefit of some ex-convicts. Yogen after failing to convince Sadhna to find a partner matching her social stature, finally respects her affection and gives in. Sadhna is an independent-minded girl and does not hesitate to argue with her father about social justice for the poor and underprivileged. The story takes many twists and turns with songs and dance numbers as usually happen in movies. But, their desire to marry is vehemently opposed by the father of the bride. He even calls the police and gets him rearrested as he is the absconding murder convict. Eventually, he relents as he realizes that Sadhna and Yogen are truly and passionately in love. He also realizes that Yogen is not after his wealth. To make amends and to see his daughter happy, he resigns his Govt. Counsel's job and takes up Yogen's case as the defense counsel in order to save him. It turns out that one member of the jury is the actual culprit, whose vehicle ran over and killed the trader, who was pursuing a fleeing Yogen with the snatched fifty rupees. The juror confesses to his crime and is taken into custody. Yogen is absolved and is united with Sadhna.

For comic relief, there is a parallel track of Shri Rashiklal Mehta(Gope), Assisting Advocate to the Prosecution Counsel, who is infatuated with Sadhna without any reciprocation from her but, was at loggerheads with Rani. At the end, he is also shown to be united with Rani.

== Cast ==
- Suraiya as Sadhna
- Dev Anand as Yogen (short form of Yogendra)
- Meena Kumari as Rani (Sadhna's best friend)
- Gope as Rasiklal Mehta
- K. N. Singh as Government Counsel & father of Sadhana
- Pratimadevi as Sadhna's mother
- Jilloo as Yogen's Mother

== Music and songs ==
The film's music was composed by the duo Husnlal Bhagatram and all songs were written by lyricist Qamar Jalalabadi

1. "O Sanam, Main Tujhe Pukaarun SanamSanam" – Suraiya, Mohammed Rafi
2. "Mai Kah Du Tumko Chor To" – Suraiya, Mohammed Rafi
3. "Bedard Shikaari Are Bedard Shikaari" – Lata Mangeshkar, Suraiya
4. "Mere Chahne Wale Hazar" – Suraiya, S. D. Batish
5. "Honthon Pe Kisi Kaa Naam, Isakaa Kyaa Matalab Hai" – Suraiya
6. "Honolulu, Kyun Hamen Paidaa Kiyaa" – Shamshad Begum
7. "Bolo Bolo Re Bhagwan Bolo Bolo Re" – Shamshad Begum, Suraiya
8. "Duniya Wale Meri Duniya Lut Gayi" – Suraiya
9. "Mera Dil Todkar Jaane Wale" – Suraiya
10. "Nayaa Nayaa Hai Pyaar Zamaanaa Dekh Na Le" – S. D. Batish, Shamshad Begum, Suraiya
11. "Ye Kehti Hai Dunia Tujhe Bhul Jau" – Suraiya
12. "Dil Le Gaya Ji Koi Dil Le Gaya" - Suraiya, Shamshad Begum
