= Balam (1949 film) =

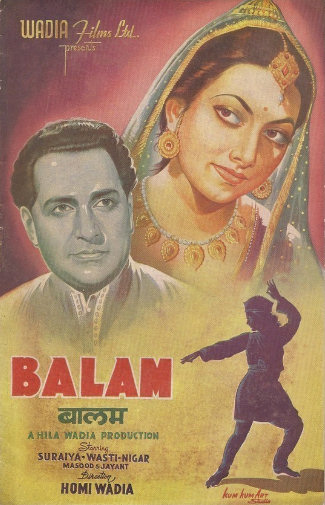
- Directed by: Homi Wadia
- Written by: JBH Wadia
- Produced by: Hila Wadia Productions
- Starring: Suraiya; Wasti; Masood; Jayant; Agha
- Music by: Husnlal Bhagatram
- Production company: Wadia Movies
- Release date: 1949
- Country: India
- Language: Hindi

Balam (Hindi: बालम, Beloved) is a 1949 Hindi romantic action film directed by Homi Wadia. Credited as A Hila Wadia Production by Wadia Brothers the film starred Suraiya, Wasti, Masood, Nigar Sultana, Jayant, Gulnar and Agha. The music directors were Husnlal Bhagatram.

== Cast ==
- Suraiya
- Wasti
- Masood
- Nigar
- Jayant
- Agha
- Jankidas
- Suraiya Chawdhry
- Gulnar
- Anwari
- Master Ratan
- H. Prakash

== Music ==
The music was composed by Husnlal Bhagatram and lyrics by Qamar Jalalabadi. Lata Mangeshkar sang her first duet with Suraiya in this film with the song "O Pardesi Musafir Kise Karta Hai Ishare".

=== Song list ===
Song	Singer
"Tum Hamen Bhool Gaye"	Mohammed Rafi
"Thukrake Hamen Chal Diye"	Mohammed Rafi
"Aata Hai Zindagi Mein Bhala Pyar Kis Tarah"	Mohammed Rafi, Suraiya
"O Pardesi Musafir, Kise Karta Hai Ishare"	Lata Mangeshkar, Suraiya
"Aise Mein Agar Tum Aa Jate"	Suraiya
"Pyar Mein Do Dil Mile"	Suraiya
"Jo Bhoole Hai Tujhe Ae Dil"	Suraiya
"Dekh Li O Duniyawale"	Suraiya
"Yahi Hai Kaisa Pyar"	
