= Afsana (1951 film) =

- Directed by: B. R. Chopra
- Written by: I. S. Johar
- Screenplay by: I. S. Johar
- Story by: I. S. Johar
- Produced by: B. R. Chopra; Shadilal Handa
- Starring: Ashok Kumar; Veena; Pran; Kuldip Kaur; Jeevan
- Cinematography: Rajendra Malone
- Edited by: Pran Mehra
- Music by: Husnlal Bhagatram
- Production company: Sri Gopal Productions
- Distributed by: Tribhuvan Productions
- Release date: 1951
- Running time: 154 min
- Country: India
- Language: Hindi

Afsana (transl. The Tale) is a 1951 Hindi-language drama film. It was the directorial debut of B. R. Chopra and starred Ashok Kumar as twin brothers, starting a trend for such dual roles.

It co-starred Veena, Pran, Kuldip Kaur, Jeevan, Cuckoo, and Baby Tabassum. The story was written by I. S. Johar and the music composed by Husnlal Bhagatram. The film is partly based on Marie Correlli's "Vendetta"

== Plot summary ==
Ratan and Chaman (Ashok Kumar) are twin brothers who love the same girl, Meera. During a fair, all three are separated. While Chaman and Meera are found, Ratan is untraceable. Ratan lose his memory and brought up in an orphanage as Ashok . He works his way up to become a magistrate , is loved and respected by all, and is married to Leela (Kuldip Kaur ) Years later, Chaman is no longer attracted to Meera, but to a dancing girl named Rasily, while Meera awaits word of her childhood sweetheart Ratan, who she feels is still alive. Then the unexpected happens, Chaman gets into a fight with another man, killing him, and is on the run from the police. Misunderstandings are clarified, and the law declares this to be an accidental death, and as a result Chaman returns. But this is not the same Chaman any more. For one thing, he has lost interest in Rasily, and is more interested in Meera.

== Cast ==
- Ashok Kumar as Ratan Kumar alias Judge Ashok Kumar / Diwan Chaman Kumar
- Veena as Meera
- Jeevan as Chatpat
- Kuldip Kaur as Leela
- Pran as Mohan
- Cuckoo as Rassily
- Tabassum as Young Meera (Baby Tabassum)
- Chaman Puri as Meera's blind dad
- Rattan Kumar as Young Ratan / Chaman
- Narbada Shankar as doctor
- O. P. Ralhan
- Jagdeep as Child in theatre play
- Uma Dutt

== Music ==
The music was composed by Husnlal Bhagatram and the lyrics were by Asad Bhopali, Chander Oberoi, Saraswati Kumar Deepak and Ghafil Harnalvi.

=== Soundtrack list ===
Song	Singer	Lyricist
"Duniya Ek Kahaani Re Bhaiya"	Mohammed Rafi	Saraswati Kumar Deepak
"Chowpati Pe Kal Jo Tujhse Aankh Matakka Ho Gaya"	Mohammed Rafi, Shamshad Begum	Chander Oberoi
"Khushiyon Ke Din Manaaye Jaa"	Lata Mangeshkar	Ghafil Harnalvi
"Kahan Hai Tu Mere Sapnon Ke Raja"	Lata Mangeshkar	Asad Bhopali
"Woh Aaye Bahaarein Laaye Baji Shehnai"	Lata Mangeshkar	Asad Bhopali
"Woh Paas Bhi Rehkar Paas Nahin"	Lata Mangeshkar	Asad Bhopali
"Aaj Kuchh Aisi Chot Lagi Hai"	Lata Mangeshkar	Asad Bhopali
"Mohabbat Ka Dono Ke Dil Par Asar Hai"	Shamshad Begum	Asad Bhopali
"Kismat Bigdi Duniya Badli Phir Kaun Kisika Hota Hai"	Mukesh	Asad Bhopali
