= Holi Ayee Re =

- Directed by: Harsukh Jagneshwar Bhatt
- Produced by: Shankarbhai Bhatt; Vijay Bhatt
- Starring: Mala Sinha
- Music by: Kalyanji Anandji
- Production company: Shri Prakash Pictures
- Release date: 23 October 1970
- Country: India
- Language: Hindi

Holi Ayee Re (transl. Holi has come) is a 1970 Indian Bollywood romance film directed by Harsukh Jagneshwar Bhatt. The film stars Balraj Sahani, Premendra, Rehman, Rajendra Nath, Kanhaiyalal, Shatrughan Sinha and Mala Sinha.

== Cast ==
- Shatrughan Sinha .... Inspector Suresh
- Mala Sinha ... Suhagi and Hemlata
- Balraj Sahni .... Thakur Mangal Singh
- Rehman .... Thakur Gopal Singh
- Premendra (actor) Parashar, Dr Prakash
- Kumud Chuggani ... Sunita
- Rajendra Nath ... Sampat
- Kanhaiyalal ... Anokhe Lal
- Jankidas
- Dulari
- Praveen Paul
- Zulfiqar Ali

== Soundtrack ==
The music of this movie was composed by Kalyanji–Anandji. "Meri Tamannaon Ki Taqdeer Tum" by Mukesh was one of the movie's best known songs.

#	Title	Singer(s)
1	"Chal Chal Re Raahi Chal Re"	Mahendra Kapoor
2	"Holi Aaee Re"	Mahendra Kapoor, Lata Mangeshkar, Usha Khanna
3	"Jawaniya Ke Din Dui Char Rasiya"	Hansa Dave
4	"Meri Lottery Lag Jane Wali Hai"	Kishore Kumar
5	"Meri Tamannaon Ki Taqdeer Tum"	Mukesh
6	"Meri Tamannaon Ki Taqdeer"	Lata Mangeshkar
7	"Tere Haseen Badan Mein"	Mukesh
