= Kachcha Chor =

- Directed by: Jambu
- Written by: Qamar Jalalabadi
- Produced by: Malik Chand Kochar
- Starring: Randhir Kapoor; Rekha; Helen; Ranjeet; Jagdeep
- Music by: Laxmikant-Pyarelal
- Distributed by: Movie Mughals
- Release date: 1977
- Running time: 123 minutes
- Country: India
- Language: Hindi

Kachcha Chor is a 1977 Bollywood drama film starring Randhir Kapoor and Rekha and directed by Jambu.

== Synopsis ==
Shyam, an educated unemployed youth, out of his sheer poverty, makes an attempt to rob Asha, an NGO worker. Asha being a Good Samaritan asks Shyam to join her NGO and give up all his wrongdoings.

== Cast ==
- Randhir Kapoor as Shyam
- Rekha as Asha
- Helen as Mona
- Ranjeet as Boss
- Jagdeep as Popatlal

== Soundtrack ==
Song title	Singer
"Kabhi Garibon Se Pyar Kar Le, Ja Tera Bhala Ho"	Kishore Kumar, Asha Bhosle
"Pehle Hum Muskuraye"	Asha Bhosle
"Dil Ki Chori Janun Na, Main Hoon Kachcha Chor"	Asha Bhosle, Mahendra Kapoor
"Dhola Dhola Dhola Souten Sang Na Jaye"	Asha Bhosle, Usha Mangeshkar
