= Kuldip Kaur =

Indian actress (1927–1960)

- Kuldip Kaur in Baiju Bawra (1952)
- Born: 1927; Lahore, Punjab, British India
- Died: 3 February 1960 (aged 32–33); Bombay, Maharashtra, India
- Occupation: Actor
- Years active: 1948–1960
- Spouse: Sardar Mohinder Singh Sidhu of Attariwala

Kuldip Kaur, (born Bibi Kuldip Kaur of Bharatgarh 1927–3 February 1960), also known as Sardarni Kuldeep Kaur Attariwala, was an Indian actress who worked in Hindi and Punjabi films. Known for her roles as negative characters, she was cited as one of Indian cinema's "most polished vamps" and actor Pran's "opposite number". She started her acting career with the first Punjabi film produced in India following Partition; Chaman, also called The Garden in 1948.

Acclaimed as a "vamp" of "exceptional talent" and the "first female villain" in Indian cinema, she has been compared to artists like Shashikala and Bindu. Active from 1948 to 1960, she acted in over 100 films, most of them in Hindi and some in Punjabi. She died in 1960. from tetanus.

== Personal life ==
Kuldip Kaur was born to Sardar Joginder Singh of Bharatgarh in Lahore, Punjab, British India. Her mother was from the Ladhran royal family in Attari, Amritsar District, in Punjab. Her elder sister, Bibi Prem Prakash Kaur Sahiba married to Sardar Gajan Singh from Naurangwal, he was the Owner of Matewal forest.

At the age of 14 she was married to Mohinder Singh Sidhu, a grandson of the military Commander of Maharaja Ranjit Singh's army, General Sham Singh Attariwala. She became a mother at the age of sixteen.

Kaur defied convention to join films while still in Lahore. She left Lahore in 1947 while communal violence was raging. She was described as a brave lady by Saadat Hasan Manto in his chapter on Kuldip Kaur, titled "Kuldip Kaur: The Punjabi firecracker" in his book Stars from Another Sky: The Bombay Film World of the 1940s. Kaur returned to Lahore in spite of the violence, to pick up Pran's car. His car had been left behind when Pran and she left for Bombay to escape the Sikh genocide in Lahore following partition of India. She drove the car back alone from Lahore to Bombay, via Delhi.

== Career ==
The German cinematographer, Josef Wirsching of Bombay Talkies, took her screen test at the request of Savak Vacha, one of Bombay Talkies' then-proprietors, along with Ashok Kumar and S. Mukherji. On his recommendation she was cast in supporting roles.

One of Kuldip Kaur's first films was the Punjabi language Chaman in 1948, which turned out to be a big success at the box office, co-starring Karan Dewan with Meena Shorey. Kuldip Kaur also acted in two Hindi films that year; Ziddi directed by Shaheed Latif and starring Dev Anand, Kamini Kaushal and Pran, and Grahasti both of which were "box office hits". In Grahasti she performed the role of a "modern, sophisticated woman intolerant of her husband".

In 1949, Kuldip Kaur acted a musical success, Ek Thi Ladki, with music by Vinod. Her next film was Kaneez, in 1949, an average film commercially. In 1950, she was in two successful Hindi films; Samadhi and Aadhi Raat and two Punjabi films; Madari and Chhai. In Samadhi, the popular song "Gore Gore Banke Chhore" was picturised on her and Nalini Jaywant. In 1951, she acted in several films such as Rajput, Nai Zindagi, Ek Nazar, Afsana and Mukhda, where she played the lead role. Afsana was directed by B. R. Chopra and starred Ashok Kumar and Veena. Kaur was stated to have played her role of a vamp "to perfection".

She also then appeared in films such as Baiju Bawra (1952) in which her acting was critically acclaimed as the dacoit queen, Roopmati. Some of the other films she acted in 1952 to 54 were Anjaam (1952), Baaz (1953), Anarkali (1953) where her acting was praised, Aabshar (1953), Gul Bahar and Dak Babu in (1954). 1955 was a busy year for her, acting in films such as Teer Andaz (1955) and Miss Coca Cola (1955). With few releases in 1956, she returned with Ek Saal (1957), acting opposite Madhubala and Ashok Kumar. In 1958, Kuldip Kaur had roles in two films; Sahara and Panchayat. In 1959, she worked in three films Pyaar Ka Rishta, Mohar and Jagir. Mohar had music composed by Madan Mohan and became another musical success for her. Maa Baap, Bade Ghar Ki Bahu, Sunheri Raatein and the Punjabi film Yamla Jatt in 1960 were the last films she acted in. Her last film was Honeymoon (1960), also one in which she played the vamp.

Some of the important films Kuldip Kaur acted in were Ek Thi Ladki, Samadhi (1950), Aadhi Raat (1950), Chhoti Bhabhi (1950), Anarkali (1953), Afsana (1951) and Baiju Bawra.

== Death ==
Kaur died on 3 February 1960, in Bombay, Maharashtra, of tetanus, following thorn pricks from a Ber tree (jujube) on a visit to Shirdi, Ahmednagar District, which she did not consider serious enough to require treatment.

== Filmography ==
Kuldip Kaur was active between 1948 and 1960.

Year	Film	Director
1948	Chaman	Roop K. Shorey
1948	Ziddi	Shaheed Latif
1949	Kaneez	Krishna Kumar
1949	Ek Thi Ladki	Roop K. Shorey
1949	Tara	R. D. Pareenja
1950	Aadhi Raat	S. K. Ojha
1950	Lajawab	Jagatrai Pesumal Advani
1950	Meena Bazaar	Ravindra Dave
1950	Samadhi	Ramesh Saigal
1950	Madaari, Punjabi Movie	Rajendra Sharma
1950	"Chhai", Punjabi Movie	Shankar Mehta
1951	Afsana	B. R. Chopra
1951	Do Sitare	D. D. Kashyap
1951	Ek Nazar	O. P. Dutta
1951	For Ladies Only	Bedi
1951	Gumasta	S. M. Yusuf
1951	Lachak	M. I. Daramsey
1951	Mukhada	Roop K. Shorey
1951	Nai Zindagi	Mohan Sinha
1951	Rajput	Lekhraj Bhakri
1951	Stage	Vijay Mhatre
1952	Anjaam	Shanti Kumar
1952	Baiju Bawra	Vijay Bhatt
1952	Ghungru	Hiren Bose
1952	Hamari Duniya	Sushil Sahu
1952	Jaggu	Jagdish Sethi
1952	Naubahar	Anand Kumar
1952	Neelam Pari	Dhirubhai Desai
1952	Sheesham	Kishore Sharma
1953	Aabshar	Hasrat Lucknavi
1953	Anarkali	Nandlal Jaswantlal
1953	Baaz	Guru Dutt
1953	Gharbaar	Dinkar Patil
1953	Farmaish	B. K. Sagar
1953	Mashuqa	Shanti Kumar
1954	Dak Babu	Lekhraj Bhakri
1954	Gul Bahar	Nanubhai
1954	Pilpili Saheb	H.S. Kavatra
1954	Hukumat	Raja Yagnik
1954	Lalpari	Kedar Kapoor
1954	Mastana	H. S. Rawail
1955	Daku	Aspi
1955	Deewar	I.S Bali
1955	Duniya Gol Hai	Om Prakash
1955	Jashan	S. Shamsuddin
1955	Mast Qalandar	Kedar Kapoor
1955	Miss Coca-Cola	Kedar Kapoor
1956	Indra Leela	Rajendra Sharma
1956	Inquilab	Kedar Kapoor
1956	Sultan-E-Alam	Mohan Sinha
1957	Ek Saal	Devendra Goel
1957	Jai Ambe	Shanti Kumar
1957	Maharani	A. Karim
1957	Paisa	Prithviraj Kapoor
1958	Panchayat	Lekhraj Bhakri
1958	Sahara	Lekhraj Bhakri
1958	Son Of Sindbad	Nanabhai Bhatt
1959	Chand	Lekhraj Bhakri
1959	Jagir	Jag Mohan Mattu
1959	Mohar	P. Jairaj
1959	Pyar Ki Rahen	Lekhraj Bhakri
1960	Bade Ghar Ki Bahu	Kundan Kumar
1960	Bhakta Raj	Vishnu Vyas
1960	Maa Baap	Vishnu Vyas
1960	Rickshawala	Shankar Mehta
1960	Sunheri Raatein	Lekhraj Bhakri
