= O. P. Dutta =

Indian filmmaker and writer

Om Prakash Dutta (1922 – 9 February 2012) was an Indian filmmaker and writer. He began his career in 1948, by directing the film, Pyar Ki Jeet, which stars actress-singer, Suraiya. The film catapulted her to 'Super Star' status. He directed nine films until 1959, after which he got into writing dialogues, scripts and stories for films. He wrote most of the films for his son, film director J. P. Dutta, notably Border and LOC Kargil. In 2001, he won the International Indian Film Academy Award and the Filmfare Award for the film Refugee. In 2006, he won a Lifetime Achievement Award from Filmfare. Dutta died from pneumonia in Mumbai on 9 February 2012. He was 90.

O. P made a film in Karachi post independence in the early 1950s, called 'Anokhi', and further helped build a studio in that city. He wrote scripts/dialogues for the films Mastana, Jeet, Chirag and Do Raaste, among others. He did not figure in the credits due to differences with Raj Khosla, who insisted on him sharing credits with another writer.

O. P was the father-in-law of former actress Bindiya Goswami.

== Filmography ==
- Umrao Jaan (2006) - writer
- LOC: Kargil (2003) - writer
- Refugee (2000) - writer
- Border (1997) - writer
- Kshatriya (1993) - writer
- Hathyar (1989) - writer
- Yateem (1988) - writer
- Ghulami (1985) - writer
- Aangan (1959)- director
- Hulare (1957) - director (Punjabi Movie)
- Lagan (1955) - director
- Malkin (1953) - director
- Parbat (1952) - director
- Ek Nazar (1951) - director
- Surajmukhi (1950) - director
- Hamari Manzil (1949) - director
- Pyaar Ki Jeet (1948) - director
