= Rajendra Krishan =

Indian poet, lyricist and screenwriter (1919–1987)

Rajinder Krishan
- Born: 6 June 1919; Jalalpur Jattan, Punjab, British India (now in Punjab, Pakistan)
- Died: 23 September 1987 (aged 68); Bombay, Maharashtra, India
- Other name: Rajinder Krishan
- Occupations: Film Songs Lyricist, Dialogue and Screenplay Writer
- Years active: 1948–1987
- Awards: Filmfare Award for 'Best Lyricist' in 1966

Rajinder Krishan Duggal (6 June 1919 – 23 September 1987) also credited as Rajendra Krishan, was an Indian poet, lyricist and screenwriter.

== Biography ==
Rajinder Krishan was born in a Duggal family at Jalalpur Jattan on 6 June 1919, in Gujrat District (in present-day Pakistan). Even when he was studying in the eighth grade, he was attracted to poetry. In his early work life he had a clerk's job in the municipal office in Simla, where he toiled up to 1942. During that period, he read eastern and western authors extensively and wrote poetry. He expresses his indebtedness to the Urdu poetry of Firaq Gorakhpuri and Ehsan Danish, as well as to the Hindi poems of Pant and Nirala. In those days, the newspapers in the Delhi-Punjab brought out special supplements and held poetry contests to mark Krishna Janmashtami, in which he participated regularly.

In the mid-1940s, Krishan shifted to Bombay (now Mumbai) to become a screenwriter in the Hindi film industry. His first screenplay was Janta (1947). His first film as a lyricist was Zanjeer (1947). He was first noted for the script and lyrics of the Motilal-Suraiya starring Aaj Ki Rat (1948). After the assassination of Mahatma Gandhi, Krishan wrote a song Suno Suno Aye Duniyawalon, Bapu Ki Yeh Amar Kahani. The song was sung by Mohammed Rafi and composed by Husnlal Bhagatram, and was a great hit. He also tasted success as a lyricist with the films Badi Bahen (1949) and Lahore (1949).

Rajinder Krishan is known for his association with the composer C. Ramchandra. He worked with several other music directors including Shankar–Jaikishan, Ravi, Rajesh Roshan, Madan Mohan, Hemant Kumar, Sajjad Hussain, Sachin Dev Burman, Rahul Dev Burman, S. Mohinder, Chitragupta, Salil Chowdhury, and Laxmikant–Pyarelal.

== Death and legacy ==
He died on 23 September 1987 in Mumbai. After his death, His Master's Voice brought out an LP containing 12 of his songs. He was known to keep a low profile and did not actively seek much publicity about himself. That's why many people that liked his penned songs, didn't know what he looked like due to a small number of available professional pictures of him.

== Trivia ==
Rajinder Krishan was considered the richest writer in Hindi cinema. The reason was that he had won a jackpot worth 4,600,000 rupees in horse racing. The sum was considered a huge amount during the late seventies.

== Awards ==
Rajinder Krishan won Filmfare Best Lyricist Award for the movie Khandan (1965) for the song "Tumhi mere mandir, tumhi meri pooja".

== Filmography ==
=== Lyricist ===
Year	Film	Music Director(s)	Notes
1947	Zanjeer		Debut film
1948	Aaj Ki Raat	Husnlal-Bhagatram	
1949	Amar Kahani	Husnlal-Bhagatram	
1949	Badi Bahen	Husnlal-Bhagatram	
1949	Patanga	Ramchandra Narhar Chitalkar	
1950	Madhubala	Lachhiram Tamar	
1951	Aaram	Anil Krishna Biswas	
1951	Albela	Ramchandra Narhar Chitalkar	
1951	Sagai	Ramchandra Narhar Chitalkar	
1951	Sazaa	Sachin Dev Burman	
1952	Ashiana	Madan Mohan Kohli	
1952	Sangdil	Sajjad Hussain	
1952	Saqi	Ramchandra Narhar Chitalkar	
1953	Anarkali	Ramchandra Narhar Chitalkar	
1953	Ladki	Ramchandra Narhar Chitalkar and Dhaniram	
1953	Papi	Mohinder Singh Sarna	
1954	Nagin	Hemant Kumar	
1955	Azaad	Ramchandra Narhar Chitalkar	
1955	Insaniyat	Ramchandra Narhar Chitalkar	
1956	Anjaan : Somewhere In Delhi	Hemant Kumar	
1956	Bhai-Bhai	Madan Mohan Kohli	
1956	Mem Sahib	Madan Mohan Kohli	
1956	Taj	Hemant Kumar	
1957	Aasha	Ramchandra Narhar Chitalkar	
1957	Dekh Kabira Roya	Madan Mohan Kohli	
1957	Gateway Of India	Madan Mohan Kohli	
1957	Miss India	Sachin Dev Burman	
1957	Sharada	Ramchandra Narhar Chitalkar	
1958	Amar Deep	Ramchandra Narhar Chitalkar	
1958	Jailor	Madan Mohan Kohli	
1958	Khazanchi	Madan Mohan Kohli	
1960	College Girl	Shankar-Jaikishan	
1960	Patang	Chitragupta Srivastava	
1961	Chhaya	Salil Chowdhury	
1961	Nazrana	Ravi Shankar Sharma	
1962	Man-Mauji	Madan Mohan Kohli	
1962	Prem Patra	Salil Chowdhury	
1962	Rakhi	Ravi Shankar Sharma	
1963	Bharosa	Ravi Shankar Sharma	
1963	Bluff Master	Kalyanji-Anandji	
1963	Ghar Basake Dekho	Ravi Shankar Sharma	
1963	Yeh Rastey Hain Pyar Ke	Ravi Shankar Sharma	
1964	Jahan Ara	Madan Mohan Kohli	
1964	Main Bhi Ladki Hoon	Chitragupta Srivastava	
1964	Pooja Ke Phool	Madan Mohan Kohli	
1964	Sharabi	Madan Mohan Kohli	
1964	Shehnai	Ravi Shankar Sharma	
1965	Khandan	Ravi Shankar Sharma	
1966	Sagaai	Ravi Shankar Sharma	
1968	Brahmachari	Shankar-Jaikishan	
1968	Gauri	Ravi Shankar Sharma	
1968	Padosan	Rahul Dev Burman	
1969	Doli	Ravi Shankar Sharma	
1969	Ek Shriman Ek Shrimati	Kalyanji-Anandji	
1969	Sachaai	Shankar-Jaikishan	
1969	Tumse Achha Kaun Hai	Shankar-Jaikishan	
1969	Waris	Rahul Dev Burman	
1970	Dharti	Shankar-Jaikishan	
1970	Ganwaar	Naushad Ali	
1970	Gopi	Kalyanji-Anandji	
1972	Bombay To Goa	Rahul Dev Burman	
1973	Jwar Bhata	Kalyanji-Anandji	
1973	Banarasi Babu	Kalyanji-Anandji	
1973	Blackmail	Kalyanji-Anandji	
1981	Silsila	Shiv-Hari	

- Aag Ka Darya (1990) (lyrics)
- Allah Rakha (1986) (lyrics)
- Khel Mohabbat Ka (1986) (dialogue & story)
- Dharm Adhikari (1986) (dialogue)
- Ponga Pandit (1975) (dialogue)
- Naya Din Nai Raat (1974) (dialogue)
- Geeta Mera Naam (1974)
- Kahani Kismat Ki (1973) (lyrics)
- Maalik (1972) (dialogue)
- Shehzada (1972) (dialogue)
- Rakhwala (1971) (lyrics)
- Man Mandir (1971) (dialogue, screenplay, & lyrics)
- Reshma Aur Shera (1971) (lyrics)
- Jawab (1970 film)(1970) (dialogue & lyrics)
- Pyar Ka Sapna (1969) (dialogue & lyrics)
- Sadhu Aur Shaitaan (1968) (dialogue)
- Nai Roshni (1967) (dialogue & lyrics)
- Pyar Kiye Jaa (1966) (dialogue)
- Aao Pyaar Karen (1964) (lyrics)
- Rakhi (1962) (dialogue & lyrics)
- Shaadi (1962) (dialogue & lyrics)
- Chhaya (1961) (lyrics and dialogue)
- Nazrana (1961) (dialogue & lyrics)
- Bindya (1960) (dialogue)
- Love in Simla (1960) (lyrics)
- Maa Baap (1960) (dialogue)
- Patang (1960) (dialogue & lyrics)
- Barkha (1959) (dialogue)
- Adalat (1958) (lyrics)
- Jailor (1958) (lyrics)
- Gateway of India (1957) (lyrics)
- Asha (1957) (lyrics)
- Dekh Kabira Roya (1957) (lyrics)
- Pehli Jhalak (1955) (dialogue)
- Pehli Jhalak (1955) (lyrics)
- Albela (1951) (lyrics)
- Badi Bahen (1949) (lyrics and dialogue)

=== Hindi film songs ===
- Hum pyaar mein jalne walon ko -----Jailor
- Woh paas rahe ya dur-------------Badi Bahen
- Chup Chup Khadi Ho---------------Badi Bahen
- Ye zindagi usiki hai-------------Anarkali
- Jaag Dard-e-Ishq Jaag------------Anarkali
- Zindagi Pyar Ki Do Chaar Ghadi Hoti Hai---Anarkali
- Sham dhale khidki tale-----------Albela
- Mere piya gaye Rangoon-----------Patanga
- Yeh Hawa Yeh Raat Yeh Chandni----Sangdil
- Mera dil ye pukare aaja----------Nagin
- Na bole re na bole re------------Azaad
- Jahan daal daal par sone ki------Sikandar-E-Azam
- Rang dil ki dhadkan bhi----------Patang
- Aay dil mujhe bataa de-----------Bhai Bhai
- Kadar jane na--------------------Bhai Bhai
- Chal ud ja re panchhi------------Bhaabi
- Bhooli hui yaado----------------Sanjog
- Yuhn hasraton ke daag------------Adaalat
- Jana tha hum se dur--------------Adaalat
- Unko ye shikaayat hai------------Adaalat
- Zami se hume aasmaan par---------Adaalat
- Chhup gaya koi re dur se pukaar ke---Champakali
- Kaun Aaya, Mere Man Ke Dwaare----Dekh Kabira Roya
- Hum se aaya na gaya--------------Dekh Kabira Roya
- Meri veena tum bin---------------Dekh Kabira Roya
- Eena Meena Deeka-----------------Aasha
- Berahem aasmaan------------------Bahaana
- Maajhi meri kismat ke------------Hum Hindustani
- Ye mard bade bedard--------------Miss Mary
- Itna na mujhse tu pyar badha------Chhaya
- Aansoo samajh ke kiyun-----------Chhaya
- Mein apne aap se ghabra gaya-----Bindiya
- Is bhari duniya me---------------Bharosa
- Woh dil kahan se laaoon----------Bharosa
- Dil todna kisi ka----------------Pooja Ke Phool
- Meri aankhon se koi--------------Pooja Ke Phool
- Kabhi na kabhi kahin na kahin----Sharaabi
- Mein to tum sang nain mila ke----Man Mauji
- Phir wohi sham wohi gham---------Jahan Ara
- Mein teri nazar ka suroor hoon---Jahan Ara
- Teri aankh ke aansoo pee jaoon---Jahan Ara
- Is tarah toda mera dil-----------Shehnaai
- Kya ajab saaz hai ye shehnaai----Shehnaai
- Ye raaste hai pyar ke------------Ye Raaste Hai Pyar Ke
- Tumhi mere mandir----------------Khandaan
- Sapne hai sapne------------------Nai Roshni
- Kahena hai kahena hai------------Padosan
- Mere Saamnewali Khidki Mein------Padosan
- Kabhi kabhi aaisa bhi to---------Waris
- Jo unki tamanna------------------Inteqaam
- Sukh ke sab saathi---------------Gopi
- Pal pal dil ke paas--------------Black Mail
- Naina mere rang bhare sapne------Black Mail
- Jadugar tere naina---------------Man Mandir
- Chanda chhode chandni------------Khel Kismat Ka
- Mushkil hai jeena----------------Sahib Bahadur
