= Husnlal Bhagatram =

Film music composers

Husn Lal – Bhagat Ram
- Husn Lal and Bhagat Ram in Nairobi

Background information
- Born: 8 April 1920 (Husn Lal); 1914 (Bhagat Ram)
- Origin: Kahma, Punjab, British India
- Died: 28 December 1968 (aged 48) (Husn Lal); 29 November 1973 (aged 58–59) (Bhagat Ram)
- Genres: Indian classical music, Film music
- Occupations: Music director duo, Composer
- Years active: 1930s–1955

Husn Lal and Bhagat Ram were the first legendary music director duo in Bollywood. They are two brothers, Husn Lal (8 April 1920 – 28 December 1968) and Bhagat Ram (1914 – 29 November 1973).

Husnlal Bhagatram
- Notable credit(s): worked with Pandit Amar Nath, Shankar–Jaikishan, Laxmikant–Pyarelal, Khayyam, Mahendra Kapoor, S. Mohinder , Suraiya, Lata Mangeshkar, Mohammed Rafi

Husn Lal was also a renowned violinist, vocalist (Indian classical music) and music composer, but his prowess as singer is not commonly known. And he was the disciple of Pt. Dilip Chandra Vedi. Bhagat Ram was considered an expert harmonium player.

Bhagat Ram composed music for a few films in the 1930s alone under the name "Bhagat Ram Batish". In 1944, he and Husn Lal joined forces for the first time to compose music for a film under the name Husn Lal - Bhagat Ram. The brothers were popular music composers in the 1940s and early 1950s, but their career waned after 1955.

Their oldest cousin Pandit Amarnath or Amar Nath was also a music composer of His Master's Voice and film music in the 1940s. These two great exponents trained music directors Shankar (of Shankar–Jaikishan), Laxmikant Shantaram Kudalkar (of Laxmikant–Pyarelal), Khayyam, the singer Mahendra Kapoor and the singer-composer S. Mohinder and Pandit Kesar Chand Narang. The brothers were born in Kahma, Punjab, British India.

== Early life ==
Husnlal Bhagatram were the youngest brothers of Pandit Amarnath. They were the sons of Pandit Devi Chand. Later on, Pandit Husnlal learned the music from Pandit Dilip Chandra Vedi. Later on, he learned music from Ustad Bashir Khan. On the other hand, Pandit Bhagatram was the great harmonium player

== Filmography ==
Films to their credits include:

- Chaand, 1944, by Prabhat Film Company, Pune
- Mirza Sahiban (1947 film) (only music of this film was composed by all three – Pandit Amarnath (older cousin) and two brothers Husn Lal Bhagat Ram)
- Aaj Ki Raat (1948)
- Amar Kahani, 1949
- Badi Bahen (1949)
- Balam (1949)
- Pyar Ki Jeet (1948)
- Bazaar (1949 film) (1949)
- Aadhi Raat (1950)
- Birha Ki Raat (1950)
- Chhoti Bhabhi (1950)
- Meena Bazaar (film) (1950)
- Afsana (1951)
- Sanam (1951)
- Kaafilaa (1952)
- Farmaish (1953)
- Shah Ji (1954) Punjabi movie
- Shama Parwana (1954)
- Adl-e-Jehangir (1955 film)
- Trolley Driver (1958)
- Shaheed Bhagat Singh (1963 film)
- Sapni (1963) Punjabi movie
- Main Jatti Punjab Di (1964)- Punjabi movie

== Popular songs ==
The following is a short list of some of Husnlal Bhagatram's best compositions:

- Chale Jana Nahi Nain Milake (Bari Behen)
- Chup Chup Khade Ho Zaroor Koyi Baat Hai (Bari Behen)
- "Mohabbat Ke Dhoke Mein Koi Na Aaye" - Bari Bahen
- Woh Meri Taraf Yun Chale Aa Rahe - Kaafila
- Laharon Se puuch lo - Kaafila
- Tere Nainon Ne Chori Kiya (Pyar Ki Jeet)
- Kya Yehi Tera Pyar Tha (Mirza Sahiban)
- Hath Sine Pe Jo Rakh Do To Qarar Aa Jaye (Mirza Sahiban)
- O Pardesi Musafir, Kise Karta Hai Ishare (Balam)- A Rare Duet between Lata Mangeshkar and Suraiya
- Hume Duniya ko Dil ke jakhm (Aadhi Raat)
- O Mahi O Dupatta Mera Dede (Meena Bazaar)
- Apna Bana Ke Chhod Nahi Jana (Meena Bazaar)
- O Sanam, Main Tujhe Pukaarun SanamSanam (Sanam)
- Sham e Bahar ayi -Shama Parwana
- Abhi to main jawaan hoon (Afsana) - One of the best songs of Lata Mangeshkar, It was the title song of a popular program of the same titled on Radio Ceylon for years

== See also ==
- Shankar Jaikishan
