= List of Indian Punjabi films before 1970 =

List of Punjabi films released in the Indian Punjab before 1970.

== 1969 ==
- Nanak Naam Jahaz Hai - Prithviraj Kapoor, David Abraham, Som Dutt, Vimmi I. S. Johar, Nishi, Tiwari, Jagdish Raj, Suresh, Veena, (Dir: Ram Maheshwari)
- Mukhda Chan Warga - Indira Billi, Ravindra Kapoor (Dir: Jaginder Samra)
- Pardesan - Indira Billi, Prem Chopra, Khairati, V. Gopal, Chand Burqe, Mirza Musharaf, Ram Avtar, Tun Tun (Dir: Khawar Zaman)
- Paun Baran - Ravindra Kapoor, Nandini, Gopal Saigal, Khairati, Raj Mala (Prod, Dir: Rajendra Sharma)

== 1967 ==
- Kade Dhupp Kade Chhaan - Sunder, Daisy Irani, Uma Khosla
- Khed Pritan Di - Indira Billi, Rajinder Kapoor, Yash Sharma, Joginder Samra (Dir: Joginder Samra)
- Lava Phuteya - Lava Phuteya was a hit Punjabi film which had 20 songs sung by Mahindra Kapoor, Suman Kalyanpur, Krishna Kalhe, Minoo Purshottam and Shanti Mathur. RG's maiden film in Punjabi. Shot entirely in Delhi, the film was directed by Kaushal Raj and music composed by Satish Bhatia.

== 1966 ==
- Chaddian Di Doli - I. S. Johar, Manmohan Krishna, Majnu, Helen (Dir: Lal Singh Kalsi)
- Dulla Bhatti (Dir: Baldev R. Jhingan) Sunder
- Shehar Di Kudi - Indira Billi, Shivkumar, Jagdev, Boota, Sunder, Krishna Kumari, Tari, Indira Bansal (Dir: J. D. Bhambri) Music by Harbans also none as (Harbans Papey)
- Gabroo Desh Punjab De - Manohar Deepak, Farida Jalal, Ravindra Kapoor, Randhawa
- Laiye Tod Nibhaye - Nishi, Ravinder Kapoor, Ravi Khanna, Gopal Saigal, Satish Chabbra, V. Gopal, Sheela R., Ram Avtar & Rajnath (Dir: Satish Chabbra)

== 1965 ==
- Chambe Di Kali - Indira Billi, V. Gopal, P. Jairaj, Ravindra Kapoor (Dir: B. S. Glaad)
- Dharti Veeran Di - Nishi, Manohar Deepak, Madhumati, Rajendra Kumar (Dir: Baldev R. Jhingan)
- Sassi Punnu - By Filmistan - Indira Billi, Ravindra Kapoor
- Shokan Mele Di - Indira Billi, Ravindra Kapoor (Dir: Kewal Mishra)

== 1964 ==
- Bharjaee - Krishna Kumari, Daljit, Uma Khosla, Satish Batra, Jagdish Kamal, Rajmala, Music: Harbans, (Dir: K. Chandra)
- Jagga - Dara Singh, Indira (Dir: Jugal Kishore)
- Sat Saliyan - Indira Billi, Ravindra Kapoor, Gopal Saigal, Majnu, Indira Bansal, Swarn Dada, Raj Rani (Dir: Karunesh Thakur)
- Main Jatti Punjab Di - Nishi, Prem Nath,(Dir: Baldev R. Jhingan)
- Geet Baharan De - Manohar Deepak, Jabeen Jalil
- Kiklee - Jagdish Sethi, Madan Puri, Tun Tun, Indira Billi, Madhumati, Gopal Saigal (Dir: Bekal Amritsari)
- Mama Ji - Gopal Saigal, Indira Billi Bela Bose, Mohan Choti, Mehmood
- Satluj De Kande - Balraj Sahni, Nishi, Wasti, Mirza Musharraf

== 1963 ==
- Laajo - Nishi, Daljeet (Dir: Jugal Kishore)
- Aeh Dharti Punjab Di - Prem Chopra, Jabeen Jalil
- Sapni - Prem Chopra, Nishi, Gopal Saigal
- Mere Haniyan - Indira Billi, Ravindra Kapoor (Dir: Prem Mehra)
- Lado Rani-(1963),Suresh, Indira Billi, Helen, Wasti,K.N. Singh, Shammi,Tun Tun, Gopal Sehgal, Raj Rani, Ram Avtar, Jagdish Kanwal, Wajid Khan, Swaren Dada, Mauji, Tari, Gurcharan, Mirza Musharraf, Mopet Raja
- Pind Di Kurhi - Ravindra Kapoor, Nishi, Khairati, Maruti, Wasti, Tun Tun Directed by Baldev R. Jhingan, Produced by Raj Kumar Kohli, Screenplay by Mulk Raj Bhakhri

== 1962 ==
- Khedan De Din Char - Manohar Deepak, Indira Billi, Gopal Saigal, Wasti, Jagdev, & Rajnath (Dir: Jugal Kishore and Manohar Deepak)
- Banto - Ashok Kumar, Pradeep Kumar, Nishi, Achla Sachdev (Dir: Baldev R. Jhingan)
- Chann Mahi (Dir: Anwar Kamal)
- Dhol Jani - Nishi, Sudesh, Sunder
- Pardesi Dhola - B. M Vyas, Chand Burqie, Chaman Puri, Khairati, Jeevan, Tuntun (Dir: S. P. Bakshi)

== 1961 ==
- Billo - (Dir: Shankar Mehta), indira Billi, Achla Sachdev, Sunder
- Valait Pass - Johnny Walker, Subhi Raj, Shyama, Nivedita, Music - Babul, Lyrics - Nand Lal Noorpuri (Dir: Ved Madan)
- Guddi - Madan Puri, Diljeet, Nishi, Wasti (Dir: Jugal Kishore)
- Jija Ji - Nishi, Karan Dewan, Achala Sachdev, Sunder, Uma Devi (Dir: Baldev R. Jhingan)
- Jatti - Indira Billi, Shiv Kumar

== 1960 ==
- Chaudhari Karnail Singh - Jagdish Sethi, Jabeen Jalil, Prem Chopra, Madan Puri, Krishna Kumari, Vimla, Sunder, Sheela & Rajnath (Dir: Krishan Kumar)
- Do Lachhiyan - Daljeet, Indira, Krishna Kumari, Kharaiti, Satish, Sunder, Rajnath, Shamlal, Mansaram, Jagdish Kamal, Polson, R. P. Sharma, Jeet Kapoor (Dir: Jugal Kishore)
- Heer Syal - (Dir: Shanti Prakash Bakshi)
- Kiklee' - Jagdish Sethi, Madan Puri, Tun Tun, Indira, Madhumati, Gopal Sehgal (Dir: Bekal Amritsari)
- Yamla Jatt - Indira Billi, Sunder, Kuldip Kaur, Boota, Uma Dutt, Uma Devi, Renu Maker, Cine Mala, Rani Sachdev, Dharampal, Swaran Dada (Dir: A. S. Arora)

== 1959 ==
- Bhangrha - Nishi, Sunder, Khariti, Vimla, Satish, Ramlal & Majnu Dir: Jugal Kishore, Music: Hansraj Behl. REMAKE OF THIS MOVIE IS - Jatti [1980] - Mehar Mittal, Arpana Choudhry, Vijay Tandon (Dir: Mohan Bhakri)
- Jagga Daku - Chandrashekhar, Jabeen Jalil, Jairaj, Dara Singh, Prithviraj Kapoor, Minu Mumtaz, Maruti, Tiwari

== 1958 ==
- Nikki - Shammi, Premnath, Bina Khosla, (Dir: Krishna Dev Mehra) music: Vinod
- Rani Haar - Roopmala, Sunder, Tara

== 1957 ==
- Hulare - By Filmistan (Dir: O.P. Dutta) music: S. D. Batish
- Muklawa - By Filmistan Producer Manju, Music: S. D. Batish, Star: Om Prakash
- Pingan

== 1956 ==
- Gulabo - Director: Shaminder Chahal Stars: Daljit, Manju

== 1954 ==
- Ashtali (Dir: Shanti Prakash Bakshi) Cast Daljit, Amarnath, Begumpara, Music by Vinod
- Shah Ji - Roopmala
- Vanjara - Directed by Shaminder Chahal, Cast Amarnath, Chand Burke, Kamaldeep, Majnu, Iqbal Mishra, Sunder, Ramesh Thakur

== 1952 ==
- Kaude Shah - Daljit, Miss Manju, Rajni, Th. Ramesh Nagpal, Jaswant, Mohan, Chand Burqe (Dir: Shanti Prakash Bakshi), Music Sardul Kwatra
- Jugni - Roopmala, Sunder, Majnu, Jugal Kishore, Ramesh Thakur, Shanti Madhok, Satish Batra (Dir: Rajendra Sharma), Music: Hand Raj Behl
- Lara Lappa - Director: Shanker Mehta Sunder, Amarnath, Shyama, Kuldip Kaur

== 1951 ==
- Baisakhi (Dir: Rajender Sharma)

== 1950 ==
- Bhaiyya Ji (Dir: Om Prakash Music: Vinod
- Posti - Shyama, Manorama, Amarnath, Randhir, Majnu, Ramesh Thakur, Bhag Singh, Chand Burque, Moti Sood Majnu (Dir: Krishna Dev Mehra, Music: Sardul Kwatra
- Madari - Raj Kapoor (Special Appearance), Kuldip Kaur, Om Prakash, Madan Puri, Meena Shorey, Suresh (Dir: Rajendra Sharma): Music Allha Rakha Qureshi
- Chhai : Directed by Shankar Mehta Cast / Geeta Bali, Sunder, Jeevan, Kuldip Kaur, Painga, Pran, Produced by Mulk Raj Bhakri, Music: HansRaj Behl.
- Mutiyar: Cast: Amarnath, Ramola, Shyama, Music: Vinod.
- Balo (Dir: Kuldeep), Music N. Datta. Star: Geeta Bali
- Phumman, Music: Allah Rakha Qureshi Stars: Kamal Kapoor, Om Prakash

== 1949 ==
- Lachhi Dir: Rajendra Sharma, Actor Wasti, Manorama, Randhir, Majnu, Sofia & Om Prakash, Music : Hansraj Behl

== 1948 ==
- Chaman - Meena Shorey, Karan Dewan, Kuldip Kaur, Om Prakash, Majnu, Gulab (Dir: Roop K. Shorey) First Punjabi language film produced in India following Partition. Music: Vinod

== 1947 ==
- Divani (Punjabi - made in Lahore) Director: Y. D. Sapotadar, Actors: Mumtaz Shanti, Wasti, Hussan Bano, M. Ismael, Chanda Bai
- Arsi - Banner Jeevan Pictures, Producer J. D. Chandna, Director Daud Chand, SELECT CAST Ajmal, Al Nasir, Asha Posley, Meena, Bhimsain, Chandrasekhar, Cuckoo, Iqbal, Kamla, P. N. Bali, Ram Lal & Zahur Shah

== 1946 ==
- Gul Baloch (Punjabi - made in Lahore) Director: Gul Zaman, Actors: Salma, Gul Zaman, Majnu, Ajmal, Saleem Raza, Nazar, Ghulam Qadir, Ramesh
- Kamli (Punjabi - made in Lahore) Director: Parkash Bakhshi, Actors: Asha Poslay, Rani Kiran, Ramesh, Amarnath, Sheikh Iqbal, Bhag Singh ( Bhag Singh also work in Punjabi movie Lambhardarni

1976 as Sohan Singh friend of Dara Singh)

- Sohni Mehinwal (Punjabi - made in Lahore) Director: Ishwarlal, Ravindra Jaykar, Actors: Begum Para

== 1945 ==
- Champa (Punjabi - made in Lahore) Director: Barkat Ram Mehra, Actors: Manorma, Asha Poslay, Majnu, Salma, Zahoor Shah, Baig, Sheikh Iqbal
- Nakathu (Punjabi - made in Lahore) Director: Haidar Shah, Actors: Salma, Rasheeda, Gul Zaman, Noor Mohammad Charlie, Hassan Din, Fazal Shah

== 1944 ==
- Dasi (Punjabi - made in Lahore) Director: Herran Bose, Actors: Ragni, Najmul Hassan, Geyani, Om Parkash, Kharati, Kalawati
- Shukriya (Hindi/Urdu - 1944) Directed by Harnam Singh Rawail-Actors-Ramola, Gilani, Sundar As Sundar Singh, Amar,Manorama, Roop Lekha, Zahoor Shah, Sharma,-Producer's R.C. TalwarWriter-Hakeem Ahmad Shujaa-Music director-G.A. Chishti-Lyricists/poetsG.A. Chishti—Singers-Zeenat Begum, Shamshad Begum, Naseem Akhtar, Amar, Sundar
- Koel (Punjabi - made in Lahore) Director: Roop K. Shori, Actors: Ragni,Manorama, S. D. Narang, Majnu,Ramanand Sagar, Satish, Saleem Raza, Kalawti, Ghulam Qadir, Ramesh
- Panchhi (Punjabi - made in Lahore) Director: Barkat Ram Mehra, Actors: Manorama, Radha, Zahur Raja, M. Ajmal, Salma, H. Showsani, Ghulam Qadir

== 1943 ==
- Papi (Punjabi - made in Lahore) Director: Majnu, Actors: Madhuri, Salma, Majnu, Satish, Bitra, Aram Lal, Zahoor Shah
- Poonji (Punjabi - made in Lahore) Director: Ravindra Dave, Vishnu Pancholi, Actors: Ragni, Jayant, Manorma, M. Ismael, Ajmal, Baby Akthar, Durga Mota, Anwari
- Veena (Punjabi - made in Lahore)

== 1942 ==
- Gawandi (Punjabi - made in Lahore) Director: G. R. Sethi, Actors: Veena, Sheyam, Manorma, M. Ismael, Gul Zaman, Zahoor Shah, Hassan Din, Fazal Shah, Asha Poslay
- Mangti (Punjabi - made in Lahore) Director: Roshan Lal Shori, Actors: Mumtaz Shanti, Masood Parvez, Manorma, Majnu, Gul Zaman, Ghulam Qadir, Kamla
- Nishani (Punjabi - made in Lahore) Director: Roop K. Shori, Actors: Ragni, Majnu, Roop Lekha, Ghulam Qadir, Kamla, Baig
- Patola (Punjabi - made in Calcutta) Director: Munawar H. Qasim, Lala Yaqoob, Actors: khursheed, Arun, Munawar H. Qasim, Mohni, Rafiq Arbi, Arshad Gujrati, Gulzar, Mehrbano
- Patwari (Punjabi - made in Lahore) Director: B. S. Rajan, Actors: Ragni, Narang, Manorma, Sundar Singh, Zahoor Shah, Gul Zaman, Rasheeda, Kamla
- Ravi Par (Punjabi - made in Lahore) Director: Shankar Mehta, Actors: Ragni, Dina, Rajindra, Shamshad Akthar, Saleem Raza, G.R. Premi, Fazal Elahi

== 1941 ==
- Chanbay di Kali (Punjabi - made in Calcutta) Director: Fani Majumdar, Actors: Mumtaz Shanti, Jagdesh Sethi, Habib Qabaili, Sultana, Nizami
- Choudhary (Punjabi - made in Lahore) Director: Narinjan Pal, Actors: Noorjahan, Ghulam Mohammad, Roop Lekha, Paal Chand Barq, M. Ismael, Ajmal, Durga Khotay
- Himmat (Punjabi - made in Lahore) Director: Roshan Lal Shori, Actors: Ragni, Majnu, Manorma, Radha, Zahoor Shah, Kamla, Baig, M. D. Kanwar
- Kurmai (Punjabi - made in Lahore) Director: J. K. Nanda, Actors: Radha Rani, Wasti, A. Shah, Jagdesh Sethi, Gulab, Jeevan, Shanti, Barati (1954 film) is remake of this movie.
- Mera Mahi (Punjabi - made in Lahore) Director: Shankar Mehta, Actors: Ragni, Kiran Deevan, Manorama, Zahoor Shah, Manohar, Baig, Sundar Singh
- Pardesi Dhola (Punjabi - made in Calcutta) Director: R. C. Talwar, Actors: Ramola, Geyani, Jagdesh Sethi, Zajandra
- Sehti Murad (Punjabi - made in Lahore) Director: Barkat Ram Mehra, Actors: Ragni, Ram Lal, Manorma, Razia, Gul Zaman, Zahoor Shah, Baig, Zaheer, Kamla
- Sipahi (Punjabi - made in Lahore) Director: Daud Chand, Actors: Madhuri, Heera Lal, Zohra, Altaf, A. J. Butt, Sundra, N. Ahmad

== 1940 ==
- Ali Baba 40 Chor As Alibaba (II) (Hindi/Urdu/Punjabi triple version - made in Bombay) Director: Mehboob Khan, Actors: Surendra, Sardar Akhtar, Ghulam Mohammad, Waheedan Bai, Sheti, Raj Kumar Sr.
- Dulla Bhatti (Punjabi - made in Lahore) Director: Roshan Lal Shori, Actors: Ragni, M. D. Kanwar, Baig, Majnu, Satish, Zahoor Shah, Zubaida, Himmat Singh, Bilraj Mehta
- Jagga Daku (Punjabi - made in Calcutta) Director: Raj Hans, Actors: Willait Begum, Gul Zaman, Pushpa Rani, Sundar Singh, also known Sundar Abdur Rehman Kashmiri
- Laila Majnu (Punjabi - made in Calcutta) Director: Raj Hans, Actors: Pushpa Rani, Wazir Begum, Ranjeet Kumari, P. N. Bali, Dar Kashmiri
- Mard-e-Punjab (Punjabi - made in Lahore) Director: Raj Hans, Actors: Gul Zaman, Pushpa Rani, Nazeer Begum, Sundar Das, Haidar Bandi, A. R. Kabuli
- Ik Musafir, Director: Roop K. Sohrey & Roshan Lal Shorey, Music Pandat Govind Ram,(Star cast), Manorma,

Manika, Mubarak Ali Khan, Radha Rani, Baig, Zahoor Shah, Majnu, Nafees Begum, Mehmood, Hukam Singh, Mala, Mehmood Khan, Dilawar Shah, Lal Kumari, K- Ramesh, Gokul Chand, Ranjodh, Jan Ganja, Jiwan Kapoor, Jalal Director Roop K. Sohrey, Roshan Lal Shorey

- Puran Bhagt (Punjabi - made in Calcutta) Actors: Menka, Karan Dewan
- Yamla Jatt (Punjabi - made in Lahore) Director: Moti B. Gidwani, Actors: Noorjahan, M. Ismael, Anjana, Ajmal, Durga Mota, Kuldip, S. Paul, Luddan

== 1930s ==
- 1939 - Mera Punjab (Punjabi - made in Calcutta) Director: K. D. Mehra, Actors: Haidar Bandi, Heera Lal, alkanda, Dar Kashmiri, Nazeer Begum
- 1939 - Gul Bakavli (Punjabi - made in Lahore) Director: Barkat Ram Mehra, Actors: Baby Noorjahan, M. Ismael, Suraiya, Jabeen, Miss Hemleta, Saleem Raza
- 1939 - Mirza Sahiban (Punjabi - made in Bombay) Director: D. N. Madhok, Zubeida, Ela Devi, Zahoor Raja, A. Shah, Kalyani, Mirza Musharra, Gulab, Suresh
- 1939 - Surdas Director: Krishna Dev Mehra
- 1938 - Sassi Punnu (Punjabi - made in Lahore) Director: Daud Chand, Actors: Balo, Aslam, Haidar Bandi, Pushpa Rani, Dar Kashmiri, Baby Noorjahan
- 1937 - Heer Syal (Punjabi - made in Calcutta) - Balo, P. N. Bali, Haidar Bandi, M. Ismael, Hassan Din, Eidan, Baby Noorjahan, Miss Shamshad Begum (Dir: K. D. Mehra)
- 1937 - Sohni Kumharan (Punjabi - made in Calcutta), Mumtaz Shanti, Mubarak, Mohni Devi, Hussan Devi (Dir: Raj Hans)
- 1937 - Sohni Mehinwal (Punjabi - made in Lahore) - Bashir Qawwal, Almas Bai, M. Ismael, Ajmal, Heera Lal (Dir: Roshan Lal Shori)
- 1935 - Sheela as Pind Di Kudi [made in Calcutta] - Pushpa Rani, Haidar Bandi, Eidan Bai, Mubarak, Baby Noorjahan, Film Company: Indra Movitone, Director: K. D. Mehra, Producer: Indra Movitone, Music director: K. D. Mehra, Mubarak Ali Khan, Lyricist/poet: K. D. Mehra https://pbcinema.wordpress.com/author/mnujot/
- 1934 - Mirza Sahiban (Punjabi - made in Calcutta) - Khursheed, Bhai Desa
- 1932 - Heer Ranjha - Anwari, Walait Begum, Rafiq Ghajnavi, Gul Hamid, M. Isamail Fazal Shah, Lala Yakub (Dir: Abdul Rashid Kardar)

== See also ==
- List of Indian Punjabi films of the 1970s
- List of Indian Punjabi films of the 1980s
- List of Indian Punjabi films of the 1990s
- List of Indian Punjabi films of the 2000s
- List of Pakistani films
