= Satluj De Kandhe =

1964 film

- Directed by: M. M. Billoo Mehra
- Story by: D. N. Madhok, Padam Maheshwary
- Produced by: Padam Prakash Maheshwary
- Starring: Balraj Sahni; Nishi; Mirza Musharraf; Wasti; Gopal Sahgal; Mumtaz Begum
- Cinematography: Rajni Kant Pandya
- Music by: Hansraj Behl, Sardul Kwatra, Pannalal Kathak
- Production company: Maheshwary Pictures
- Distributed by: Dilip Kumar Nail
- Release date: 1964
- Country: India
- Language: Punjabi

Satluj De Kandhe, also spelled as Satluj De Kande, is a 1964 National Award winning Punjabi romantic film directed by M. M. Billoo Mehra and produced by Padam Prakash Maheshwary.

It stars Balraj Sahni and Nishi. The movie was a major hit and was also broadcast thrice on Doordarshan, the public television network of India.

Hansraj Behl composed the music.

== Awards ==
The film won the National Film Award for Best Feature Film in Punjabi of India.

== Cast ==
- Nishi
- Balraj Sahni
- Mirza Musharraf
- Mumtaz Begum

== Film songs ==
Film Song Lyrics were by D. N. Madhok, film songs sung by Mohammed Rafi, Lata Mangeshkar, Asha Bhosle, Prakash Kaur, Surinder Kaur, Asa Singh Mastana, Panna Lal Kathak.

=== Soundtracks ===
Music was by Sardul Kwatra, Hansraj Behl, Pannalal Kathak

- Kale Rang Da ParanDa, sung by Surindar Kaur & Parkash Kaur
- Na Dasentun- sung by Mohammed Rafi
- Sun Mere Mahiya- Mohammedd Rafi & Asha Bhosle
- Bol Wey Ruldoo - sung by Asa Singh Mastana & Surinder Kaur, lyrics by B. K. Puri, music by Asa Singh Mastana

== See also ==
- Kankan De Ohle
- Bhangra (film)
- Lachhi (1949 film)
- Kaude Shah
- Do Lachhian
- Mama Ji
