= Guddi (1961 film) =

1961 film

- Directed by: Jugal Kishore
- Written by: Aziz Kashmiri
- Produced by: Chanan Oberoi; Vasdev Madan
- Starring: Daljeet; Nishi; Madan Puri; Mohan Choti; Khairati; Wasti; Uma Khosla; Mirza Musharraf
- Music by: Hansraj Behl
- Release date: 1961
- Country: India
- Language: Punjabi

Guddi is a 1961 Punjabi film directed by Jugal Kishore, from India, starring Daljeet, Nishi, Madan Puri, Khairati, Wasti and more.

== Synopsis ==
The station master, Khushi Ram, gets retired from the railways and a new station master, Chaman Lal, joins, who soon falls in love with Khushi Ram's daughter, Guddi. Khushi Ram's friend, Nihala - a suspended guard of railway, knows that and wants them to get married. Another girl, Gulabo, is also in love with Chaman Lal and expresses her love, but he feels sorry for her. A proud person of the village, Namberdaar, also wants to marry Guddi and on knowing about Chaman and Guddi's love, he has a fight with Chaman. In the fight, Chaman gets unconscious due to falling on something that hits his head. Taking advantage of the moment, Namberdaar takes the keys of the safe from his pocket and, taking Gulabo with him, steals money from his office's governmental safe. Thus, he make Chaman arrested and asks Guddi that he will save him if she is ready to marry him. Guddi, for his love's safety, says yes. At the end, on Nihala's request, Gulabo reveals the truth to the police and gets Chaman free. Thus finally, the lovers meet.

== Music ==
A noted music director, Hansraj Behl, composed the music. Aziz Kashmiri and Verma Malik penned the lyrics for playback singers Mohammad Rafi, Lata Mangeshkar and Shamshad Begum. Guddi remains famous for its lilting songs, and it is one of the movies where Bollywood legends lent their voice. An all-time hit is Pyar de bhulekhe kinne sohne sohne khaa gaye, which was sung by Mohammad Rafi and Lata Mangeshkar.

(1) Pyar De Pulekhe Kinne Sohnay Sohnay Khaa Gaye - Mohammed Rafi, lyrics by Verma Malik, music by Hansraj Behl

(2) Kisse De Na Tutte Rabba, Jimme Sahdi Tut Gaye - Suman Kalyanpur, lyrics by Verma Malik, music by Hansraj Behl

(3) Pyar De Bhuleke Kinne Sohnay Sohnay Khaa Gaye - Lata Mangeshkar, Mohammed Rafi

(4) Je Sade Nal Nahion Bolna- Lata Mangeshkar, Mohammed Rafi

(5) Dana Pani Khich Ke Leyanda - Mohammed Rafi, lyrics by Verma Malik

(6) Tut Jave Rail Gadiye - Shamshad Begum, lyrics by Verma Malik

(7) Gudh Khan Di Tey Nale Gane Chupdi - Shamshad Begum, lyrics by Verma Malik

== Cast ==
Actor/Actress	Role
Daljeet	Chaman Lal (station master)
Nishi	Guddi
Madan Puri	Namberdaar
Mohan Choti	as Batura
Randhir (actor)	astrology, Jyotishi
Mirza Musharraf	as Guddi's father
Wasti	Nihala (former guard)
Uma Khosla	Gulabo
Khairati	Mehnga
Rajan Kapoor	Thanedaar
Amol Sen	dwarf man at train station

== See also ==
- Lachhi
- Do Lachhian
- Posti
