= Gopichand =

Gopichand or Gopi Chand can refer to:

== People ==
- Gopi Chand Bhargava, Indian politician
- Gopi Chand Narang (1931–2022), Indian linguist and writer
- Tripuraneni Gopichand (1910–1962), Telugu novelist, playwright and film director
- Pullela Gopichand (born 1973), Indian badminton player
- Gopichand (actor) (born 1979), Telugu film actor
- Gopichand Hinduja (1940–2025), Indian-British billionaire businessman
- Gopichand Lagadapati (born 1981), Indian film actor, writer, director and producer

== Others ==
- The ektara, an Indian string instrument
- Gopichand (film), a 1958 Indian film
