= Dupatta (1970 film) =

1970 film

- Directed by: Mohinder Wahi
- Story by: Aziz Kashmiri
- Starring: Ravinder Kapoor; Indira Billi; Joy Mukherjee; Gopal Saigal; Sunder; Sonia Sahni; Kamal Kapoor; Saroj Khan; Manorama; Mumtaz Begum
- Music by: Sapan Jagmohan
- Release date: 1970
- Running time: 120 minutes
- Country: India
- Language: Punjabi

Dupatta is a 1970 Indian Punjabi-language film produced and directed by Mohinder Wahi, starring Ravinder Kapoor, Indira Billi, Joy Mukherjee, Sunder, and Sonia Sahni.

== Music ==
Sapan Jagmohan composed the music for playback singers Mohammad Rafi, Mahendra Kapoor and Asha Bhosle. Verma Malik wrote the film song lyrics.
