= Vashti (disambiguation) =

Vashti is a Persian queen mentioned in the Book of Esther.

Vashti may also refer to:

== People ==
- Vashti Bartlett (1873–1969), American nurse who served with the American Red Cross during World War I, and in Siberia and Manchuria after the war
- Vashti Bunyan (born 1945), English singer-songwriter
- Vashti Clarke, NY-based Jamaican model, actress, and entrepreneur
- Vashti Cunningham (born 1998), American track and field athlete specializing in the high jump
- Vashtie Kola (often stylized as Va$htie; born 1981), American music video director, filmmaker, artist, designer, creative consultant and disc jockey
- Vashti McCollum (1912–2006), the plaintiff in the landmark 1948 Supreme Court case McCollum v. Board of Education, which struck down religious education in public schools.
- Vashti Murphy McKenzie (born 1947), a bishop of the African Methodist Episcopal Church.
- Vashti Turley Murphy (1884–1960), American educator, community leader, and one of the founding members of Delta Sigma Theta
- Vashti Sawtelle, American physicist
- Vashti Thomas (born 1990), Panamaian track and field athlete

== Others ==
- Vashti, Texas, an unincorporated community in Clay County, Texas, United States
- Vashti (painting), an 1879 painting by Edwin Long
- Vashti (novel), by author Augusta Jane Evans published in 1869
- William & Vashti College, a college in Aledo, Illinois from 1908 to 1918
- Wasti, a toponymic surname originating from the city of Wasit, Iraq
