= Bahadur (film) =

Bahadur is a 1953 Bollywood film.

== Cast ==
- Suresh
- Shyama
- Anwar Hussain
- Prem Kumar

== Music ==
Song	Singer(s)
"Aa Aa Badarwa Aa Dheere Aa"	Asha Bhosle, Santram
"Ae Naakhuda Darti Hoon"	Ashima Banerjee
"Hamaari Muhabbat Zamaana Hamaara"	Ashima Banerjee, Mohammed Rafi
"Kagwa Re Balma Ke Deswa"	Rajkumari Dubey
"Meethi Meethi Khushboo Thi"	Asha Bhosle
"Muhabbat Ke Zamaane"	Ashima Banerjee
"O Bhangji Rola Rola Aao Zara Mauj Karen"	Asha Bhosle
"Shaayad Ki Bahaar Aayi"	Asha Bhosle
