= Do Lachhian =

1960 film

- Directed by: Jugal Kishore
- Produced by: Mulk Raj Bhakhri
- Starring: Gopal Sehgal; Indira Billi; Daljeet; Krishna Kumari; Sunder; Satish; Khairati; Polson
- Music by: Hansraj Behl
- Production companies: Mohan, Parks, Filmistan Studio
- Distributed by: Golden Movies
- Release date: 1960
- Running time: 105 minutes
- Country: India
- Language: Punjabi

Do Lachhian is a 1960 Punjabi film directed by Jugal Kishore, starring Gopal Sehgal, Daljeet, Indira Billi and Krishna Kumari in lead roles.

== Synopsis ==
Do Lachhian is a romantic drama. Two girls, Lachhi (Waddhi Lachhi) and Chhoti Lachhi, the daughters of Dharmu and Karmu, respectively, are in love with Labbhu and Sohna, respectively. Labbhu and his friend Natthu are alcoholic thieves and have a little crime record. A moneylender, Bhainge Shah, also wants to marry Chhoti Lachhi, and for this purpose he manages a fight between Dharmu and Karmu and so between Lachhi and Chhoti Lachhi with the help of Labbhu and Natthu. Bhainge Shah, taking advantage of the fight, manages a marriage with Chhoti Lachhi but at the time his servant, Jagga, an admirer of Lachhi's beauty, reveals the truth to Lachhi and she, apologising for their misunderstanding, saves the marriage reaching in time. Labbhu also realises his mistake and apologise. So the lovers meet.

== Music ==
The music is composed by Hansraj Behl and lyrics written by Verma Malik playback by Mohammad Rafi, Shamshad Begum and Lata Mangeshkar.

Some of the hit numbers include haye ni mera baalam, hai barha zalim and teri kanak di rakhi mundia by Shamshad Begum.

=== Track list ===
- Ek Pind Do Lachhian Mohammad Rafi, Shamshad Begum
- Haye Ni Mera Baalam, Hai Bra Zaalim Shamshad Begum
- Bhaven Bol Tey Bhaven Na Bol, Wey Channa Bas Akhian De Kol Shamshad Begum
- Majjhan Gawan Balbir Singh
- Gora Rang Na Ho Jave Kaala Mohammad Rafi, Shamshad Begum (Boliyan style on Vaisakhi Mela)
- Teri Kanak Di Rakhi Mundia, Hun Mein Nahion Behndi Mohammad Rafi, Shamshad Begum
- Sari Umraan De Pae Gaye Vichhorey Mohammad Rafi, Shamshad Begum
- Gurr Khaandi Tey Naale Ganne Chupdi Shamshad Begum
- "Asan Kitiye Tere" Mohmmad Rafi, Lata Mangeshkar

== Cast ==
| Actor/Actress | Role |
|---|---|
| Daljeet | as Sohna |
| Indira Billi | as Chhoti Lachhi |
| Krishna Kumari | as Badi Lachhi |
| Gopal Sehgal | as Jagiya |
| Sunder | as Natthu |
| Kharaiti | as Bhainge Shah |

== See also ==
- Lachhi
- Bhangra
- Satluj De Kandhe
- Kankan De Ohle
- Kaude Shah
