= Chhoo Mantar =

- Directed by: M. Sadiq
- Written by: M. Sadiq
- Produced by: Shree Sound Studios; P. B. Billimoira
- Starring: Johnny Walker; Anita Guha; Shyama
- Cinematography: Minoo B. Bilimoria
- Edited by: Moosa Mansoor
- Music by: O. P. Nayyar
- Distributed by: Sadiq Productions
- Release date: 1956
- Country: India
- Language: Hindi

Chhoo Mantar is a 1956 Bollywood drama film starring Johnny Walker, Anita Guha and Shyama. It was directed by M. Sadiq under the banner of Sadiq Productions.

== Story ==
Baijnath alias Baiju is a slacker, trouble-maker, unemployed, and a flirt. The villagers rally together and force his father to ask him to leave the village, which Baiju does. Baiju's travels take him to the castle of a king, who has a beautiful daughter named Ratnavali. When he sees Ratnavali, he is smitten by her beauty and falls head over heels in love with her. He parks himself opposite her room, and awaits the time when she will make a presence on the balcony, so that he can get an eyeful of her beautiful self. This enrages the King, and he orders his men to thoroughly beat up Baiju and throw him in the sea, which they do. But Baiju survives, recovers, and gets back to wooing the beautiful Ratnavali. This time the King challenges Baiju to accumulate ten lakh rupees in three months, and he will then give his consent to marrying Ratnavali. The King further adds that if Baiju fails, he will be hanged. Baiju accepts the challenge, and brags that he can accumulate not ten lakhs, but fifteen lakhs within that time period. With no survival nor job skills, and no one to even loan him the fifteen lakh rupees, how is Baiju going to escape from the death-trap that the King has prepared for him?

== Cast ==
- Johnny Walker as Baijnath "Baiju"
- Anita Guha as Princess Ratnavali
- Shyama as Sanwali
- Gajanan Jagirdar
- Raj Mehra
- Sheela Kashmiri

== Soundtrack ==
| Song | Singer |
|---|---|
| "Aaja Re Aaja, Na Sata" | Asha Bhosle |
| "Main Hoon Banke Nainonwali" | Asha Bhosle, Mohammed Rafi |
| "Humne Jab Dil Tha Diya, Koi Vada Tha Kiya" | Shamshad Begum, Mohammed Rafi |
| "Aankh Mein Surat Teri" | Mohammed Rafi |
| "Garib Janke Humko Na Tum Mita Dena" | Mohammed Rafi, Geeta Dutt |
| "Gham Nahin Kar Muskura, Jeene Ka Le Le Maza" | Mohammed Rafi, Geeta Dutt |
| "Jab Badal Lehraya" | Geeta Dutt |
| "Gori Gori Raat Hai" | Geeta Dutt |
| "Raat Nasheeli" | Geeta Dutt |
