= Dulari (film) =

1949 film from India

- Poster
- Directed by: A. R. Kardar
- Story by: Shams Lacknavi
- Produced by: A. R. Kardar
- Starring: Madhubala; Suresh; Geeta Bali; Jayant; Shyam Kumar
- Cinematography: Dwarkadas Divecha
- Edited by: G. G. Mayekar
- Music by: Naushad
- Production company: Kardar Productions
- Distributed by: Kardar Productions
- Release date: 18 November 1949
- Country: India
- Language: Hindi
- Box office: est. ₹7 million

Dulari is a 1949 Indian Hindi-language romantic musical film directed by A.R. Kardar. The film stars Madhubala, Geeta Bali and Suresh, and its music was composed by Naushad. Dulari revolved around Prem (Suresh), a rich man who falls in love with the eponymous gypsy girl (Madhubala).

Although not well-received by critics, the film became a major commercial success on its release. It was also continuously shown in theaters for over 35 weeks and subsequently emerged as a silver jubilee hit. The film's success played an important role in the career developments of Madhubala, Bali and Naushad.

== Plot ==
Prem Shankar (Suresh) is the son of a rich businessman whose parents want him to marry into a rich family. However, he loves a gypsy girl named Dulari (Madhubala) (who was kidnapped by gypsies in her childhood), but her father orders him not to marry her. Prem, however, disagrees and leaves the house to marry Dulari. He brings Dulari to his other house to marry. The gypsy sardar's son also wants to marry her and kidnaps her. He also loots Dulari's real father and leaves him tied up in his backyard. Another gypsy woman Kasturi (Geeta Bali) gets to know the truth about Dulari and frees her father. Prem, after fighting, frees Dulari again. His mother brings both back home, but his father refuses to bless their marriage. Another gypsy, who knows Dulari's truth and has her childhood photo comes to Prem's house. They all realize that Dulari is the daughter of a friend of Prem's father, another businessman. Dulari is reunited with her family and she and Prem get the blessings of their elders, including Prem's father.

== Cast ==
- Madhubala as Shobha / Dulari
- Suresh as Prem G. Shankar
- Shyam Kumar as Jaggu
- Geeta Bali as Kasturi
- Jayant as Girija Shankar
- Pratima Devi as Kamini G. Shankar
- Amar
- Nawab

== Soundtrack ==
The music of Dulari was composed by Naushad and lyrics were written by Shakeel Badayuni.

Song	Singer	Raga
"Chandni Aayi Banke Pyar"	Shamshad Begum	
"Na Bol Pee Pee More Angna"	Shamshad Begum	
"Taqdeer Jagakar Aayi Hoon"	Lata Mangeshkar	
"Aankhon Mein Aaja"	Lata Mangeshkar	
"Mohabbat Hamari"	Lata Mangeshkar	
"Do Din Ki Bahar"	Lata Mangeshkar	
"Ae Dil Tujhe Kasam Hai, Tu Himmat Na Haarna"	Lata Mangeshkar	
"Na Woh Humse Juda Honge"	Lata Mangeshkar	
"Kaun Sune Fariyad Hamari"	Lata Mangeshkar	
"Raat Rangeeli, Mast Nazare"	Lata Mangeshkar, Mohammed Rafi	
"Mil Milke Gayenge"	Lata Mangeshkar, Mohammed Rafi	
"Suhani Raat Dhal Chuki, Naa Jaane Tum Kab Aaoge"	Mohammed Rafi	Pahadi

== Release ==
Theatrically released on 18 November 1949, Dulari got mostly mixed reviews from critics. Nevertheless, the film emerged as the eight highest-grossing Indian film of 1949. It grossed ₹0.7 crore, including a nett of ₹0.4 crore to become a major commercial success. According to writer Raju Bharatan, the film was continuously shown in theatres for over 35 weeks, which subsequently turned it into a silver jubilee hit. Trade journalists credited the film's immense popularity to Madhubala's stardom and Naushad's music.

== Sources ==
- Akbar, Khatija (1997). Madhubala: Her Life, Her Films. UBS Publishers Distributors. ISBN 9788174761538.
- Deep, Mohan (1996). The Mystery and Mystique of Madhubala. Magna Publishing Co. Ltd. ISBN 1-906574-21-9.
- Patel, Baburao (1952). Stars of the Indian Screen. Parker & Sons.
- Bharatan, Raju (2014). Naushadnama: The Life and Music of Naushad. Hay House Inc. ISBN 9789381398630.
