= Mera Karam Mera Dharam =

- Poster
- Directed by: Dulal Guha
- Starring: Dharmendra; Moushumi Chatterjee
- Music by: Laxmikant–Pyarelal
- Release date: 10 July 1987; (India)
- Country: India
- Language: Hindi

Mera Karam Mera Dharam (transl. My deed, my religion) is a 1987 Bollywood film, starring Dharmendra and Moushumi Chatterjee. The movie was shot in Murshidabad kathgola Palace, West Bengal. It was last film of Uttam Kumar.

== Plot ==
Ajay, a businessman, provides funds to his brother Sarjuprasad to develop their hometown. When he learns that the money has been misappropriated by Sarjuprasad, he resolves to set things right.

== Cast ==
- Dharmendra as Ajay Shankar Sharma
- Moushumi Chatterjee as Mala
- Yogeeta Bali as Neela
- Shyama as Neela's Mother
- Raj Mehra as Doctor
- Shashikala as Mala's Aunty
- Johnny Walker as Second Master
- Asit Sen as Head Master
- Brahmachari as Anand
- Uttam Kumar as Devi Parsad
- Urmila Bhatt as Shivani Sharma
- Shreeram Lagoo as Sarju Prasad
- Abhi Bhattacharya as Pujari
- Rajan Haksar as Ram Bhajan
- Padma Khanna as Dancer
- Prakash Gill as Bajrang
- Sajjan as Shambhu Dada
- Jagdish Raj as Police Inspector

== Soundtrack ==
Lyrics: Anand Bakshi

Title	Singer(s)
"Janani Jagat Ki"	Hemant Kumar, Anuradha Paudwal
"Apne Dil Mein Josh Hai"	Mohammed Rafi
"Mor Papiha Koyal"	Asha Bhosle
"Sir Pe Mukut"	Lata Mangeshkar
