= Sardul Singh Kwatra =

Musician from India (1928-2005)

- Born: 1928; Lahore, Punjab Province, British India
- Died: 6 July 2005 (aged 76–77); United States
- Other name: Sardool Kwatra
- Occupations: Film director, Producer, Music composer

Sardul Singh Kwatra (1928 – 2005) was an Indian film producer, director and music composer. He is widely considered to have the skill of simplifying classical ragas to portray nuances in his music.

He composed music for Hindi and Punjabi films.

== Early life ==
Kwatra was born in 1928 to a Sikh family in Lahore in British Punjab. He was very fond of music from childhood. During his school days, he got his initial training in classical music from Avtar Singh of Lahore. Later he joined popular music director Hansraj Behl as an assistant.

== Career ==
After partition of India in 1947, Kwatra's family moved to Amritsar and then to Bombay. The first film of Kwatra Art Production was a Punjabi film, Posti (1950).

The entire cast were refugees from Lahore. Kwatra picked Shyama for the female lead. The music of the film was a hit and critically acclaimed. Kwatra modified the folk tunes of Punjab and introduced Asha Bhosle and Jagjit Kaur, who was married to Mohammed Zahur Khayyam, as playback singers for Punjabi films, with Asha Bhosle making her debut. In 1953, another Kwatra production, Kaude Shah with Shyama as heroine, became a success at the box office. Kwatra also composed the music of another Punjabi film, Vanjara (1954), in which Lata Mangeshkar sang the majority of the songs. He also introduced Shaminder as a playback singer.

Overall, Sardul Kwatra composed music for a dozen Hindi films and nearly 25 Punjabi films. After Hans Raj Behl, Sardul was the most prolific music director of Punjabi films. His last assignment was a Punjabi film Ankheeli Mutiar (1979).

In the mid 1970s, Kwatra moved to Chandigarh and established the Chandigarh Film Institute. His last assignment was a Punjabi film, Unkhilli Muttiar in 1983. Kwatra lived in Chandigarh after 1975 with his eldest son. He was great friends with actor Pradeep Kumar. He moved to USA in 1978 where he continued to teach and compose music.

== Death ==
Kwatra left for the United States in 1978 and spent many years there. He died on 6 July 2005.

== Personal life ==
In addition to composing music, the Kwatra family was involved in the production and distribution of various Hindi and Punjabi movies until the 1980’s.

== Filmography ==
- Ek Teri Nishani (1949) combine with Pandit Amarnath
- Jalte Deep (1950)
- Man ka Meet (1950)
- Posti (1950) Punjabi movie
- Shagan (1951) along with Husnlal Bhagatram (Sardul Kwatra initially worked as his assistant)
- Goonj (1952) - A movie under Kwatra Productions banner
- Bewafa (1952)
- Mirza Sahiban (1953)
- Koday Shah (1953) Punjabi movie under Kwatra Productions
- Pilpili Saheb (1954) - Kwatra Productions
- Vanjara (1954) Punjabi movie
- Tees Maar Khan (1955)
- Son of Ali Baba (1955)
- Kala Chor (1956)
- Char Minar (1956)
- Mirza Sahiban (1957) Music and Produced also act in the song “Nahin Ris Punjab Di”
- Adalat (1958 film) act only (as a in the college classroom)
- Lady Robinhood (1959)
- Heer Sayal (1960) - Punjabi movie directed by his brother H.S Kwatra under Kwatra Productions
- Air Mail (1960)
- Dekha Jayega (1960)
- Gypsy Girl (1961)
- Khilari (1961)
- Billo (1961) Punjabi movie
- Deccan Queen (1962)
- Kala Chashma (1962)
- Chandrashekhar Azad (1963)
- Satluj De Kande (1964) Punjabi movie
- Accident (1965)
- Raj Karega Khalsa (1971) - Shabad Gurbani with Mahendra Kapoor, lyrics by H.S. Kohli
- Daku Mansingh (1971)
- Yamla Jatt (1977) Punjabi movie
- Lambardarni (1980) Punjabi movie
- Do Posti (1981) Punjabi movie
- Bagga Daku (1983) Punjabi Movie
- Patwari (1983) Punjabi movie
- Unkhilli Muttiar (1983) Punjabi movie
