= Maa (1952 film) =

- Directed by: Bimal Roy
- Written by: Nabendu Ghosh; Paul Mahendra
- Screenplay by: Bimal Roy
- Story by: Asit Sen; Nabendu Ghosh
- Produced by: Bombay Talkies
- Starring: Leela Chitnis; Bharat Bhushan; Shyama; Nazir Hussain
- Cinematography: Josef Wirsching
- Edited by: Hrishikesh Mukherjee
- Music by: S. K. Pal
- Production company: Bombay Talkies
- Distributed by: Bombay Talkies
- Release date: 1952
- Running time: 140 minutes
- Country: India
- Language: Hindi

Maa (Mother) is a 1952 Indian Hindi-language social family drama directed by Bimal Roy for Bombay Talkies. Bimal Roy was asked to come to Bombay from Calcutta to direct the film for the studio, which was going through bad times. Bombay Talkies' earlier favourite Leela Chitnis was cast in the eponymous role of Mother. This was the first film Roy directed in Bombay. Later, he was to break away and form his own production company: Bimal Roy Productions. The first film he produced and directed under his new banner was Do Bigha Zameen (1953), the next year.

The cinematographer was Josef Wirsching. The film's music was composed by S. K. Pal with lyrics by Bharat Vyas. The film co-starred Bharat Bhushan, Shyama, Nazir Hussain, Mehmood and B. M. Vyas.

The story was said to be adapted loosely from the old Hollywood film Over The Hills, which was about a "self-sacrificing son and his mother". According to B. D. Garga, the film's sentimental melodrama was handled with intelligence and finesse by Roy, which stopped it from becoming a "mushy tear-jerker".

The 1979 film Khandaan is a remake of this film and it was in turn remade in Telugu as Jeevitha Ratnam (1981).

== Plot ==
Chandar (Nazir Hussain), a retired postmaster, lives in the village with his wife (Leela Chitnis) and two sons, Rajan (Paul Mahendra) and Bhanu (Bharat Bhushan). He continues to live there and work for the Zamindar (landowner), while his children are getting their education. Rajan is studying for his law exam. He is married to a girl (Padma) from a wealthy family whose haughty ways alarm and frighten him. Bhanu, the younger brother is fun-loving but studious. He gets influenced by the Nationalist Movement in the campus and stops his education in the last year of college. His father is disappointed and feels that Rajan is the one they can depend upon in their old age. Bhanu meets Meena (Shyama) and the two fall in love. Meena's father, Ramnarayan, is the school Principal and is impressed by Bhanu. He decides to get Meena married to Bhanu.

Rajan's law exams are nearing and he needs Rs. 300 to pay the fees. His wife refuses to get him the money. Chandar tries all avenues to get the money but fails to do so. Bhanu, returning from a fair one night hears the cries of "Thief, thief". He sees his father being pursued by a crowd and immediately runs ahead of them. The crowd thinking him to be the thief, hands him over to the police. He is jailed for one year. On his return, Rajan, who by now has passed his exam, refuses to let him meet their father. The father is ashamed and wants to apologise to Bhanu for suffering on his account. He is sick in bed, but when he hears of Bhanu coming to meet him he tries rushing out but dies. Bhanu leaves, thinking his parents don't want to meet him.

The mother is now bereft and insanely roaming the streets looking for Bhanu. She's informed that Bhanu is dead, and she now lives as a maidservant in her son Rajan's house. Finally, with Meena's help, Bhanu meets his mother and takes her away from Rajan's house.

== Cast ==
- Bharat Bhushan as Bhanu
- Shyama as Meena
- Nazir Hussain as Chandar
- Leela Chitnis as Mrs. Chandar
- Paul Mahendra as Raju
- Achala Sachdev
- Kumud as Padma
- Kusum Deshpande
- B. M. Vyas
- Mehmood

== Soundtrack ==
The music was composed by S. K. Pal with lyrics by Bharat Vyas. The singers were Kishore Kumar, Manna Dey, Asha Bhosle, Afzal, Geeta Dutt and Arun Kumar.

=== Song list ===
| Song | Singer |
|---|---|
| "Jeeo Jeeo Mere Lal, Teri Tedhi Tedhi Chaal, Tune Aaj Khel Khel Mein Kamaal Kar Diya" | Kishore Kumar, Manna Dey, Arun Kumar |
| "Woh Aankhen, Kya Aankhen" | Manna Dey |
| "Chale Re, Chale Ram Banvaas" | Manna Dey |
| "Har Din Tu Rota Badal" | Geeta Dutt |
| "Main Na Boloongi Aaj" | Geeta Dutt |
| "Sach Kehte Gar Bura Na Mano, Bade Char Sau Bees Hai" | Asha Bhosle, Afzal Hussain |

== See also ==
- Khandaan (1979 film)
- Maa (album)
