= Wasit (disambiguation) =

Wasit was a medieval city in Iraq, after which the Wasit Governorate is named. It may also refer to other places in the Middle East:

- Wasit, Fujairah, United Arab Emirates
- Wasit, San‘a’, Yemen
- Wasi, Hadhramaut, Yemen
- Wasit, Israeli-occupied Golan Heights
- Wasit, a coastal village near Nuweiba, Egypt

== See also ==
- Al Waseet, another name for Al-Ittihad (Emirati newspaper)
- Tal Wassit, a Syrian village
- Wasti
