= Adalat (1958 film) =

1958 Indian Hindi film

- Directed by: Kalidas
- Written by: Rajendra Krishan
- Screenplay by: Rajendra Krishan
- Story by: Kalidas
- Produced by: Mallika Kwatra; N. S. Kwatra
- Starring: Pradeep Kumar; Nargis; Pran
- Cinematography: H. S. Kwatra
- Edited by: Mohan Rathod
- Music by: Madan Mohan
- Production company: Kwatra Films
- Distributed by: Kwatra Films
- Release date: 1958
- Country: India
- Language: Hindi

Adalat is a 1958 Bollywood drama film directed by Kalidas, starring Pradeep Kumar, Nargis, Pran in lead roles. Composed by Madan Mohan, the songs are sung by Lata Mangeshkar, Asha Bhosle, Mohammed Rafi, Geeta Dutt. The film is especially known for its meaningful, touching ghazal-type songs and melodious music. Similarly, the actors Nargis and Pran performed well.

== Plot ==
Nirmala and Barrister Rajendra Singh are in love and they have plans to get married soon. But Nirmala's aunt is jealous to see her happiness and hence wants to marry her off to an uneducated villager. The dispute turns big and Nirmala leaves her home. She takes a job in a dancing school, which turns out to be a front for a brothel. This lands her in prison, but she is not found guilty. When she returns home, she is turned away, and knowing about her shocks and kills her mom.

Again out on the streets, she attempts to find work. Pandit Kedarnath, a pimp, is now following her in order to get her for himself. But coincidentally, she meets Rajendra again. The lovers get married secretly. But then Rajendra leaves for Britain, leaving behind pregnant Nirmala. Rajendra's parents don't accept Nirmala and her child and throw her out. Nirmala gives birth to a baby boy. Her conditions worsen and she is not able to earn her living. She hence gives away her son to Dr. Renuka Roy, a kind woman, and goes into prostitution for earning money. The story turns when her son grows old to become a public prosecutor and his first case is of Nirmala, a prostitute, who is now charged with a murder.

== Cast ==
- Pradeep Kumar as Barrister Rajendra Singh "Rajan"
- Nargis as Nirmala
- Pran as Pandit Kedarnath / Shareef Ahmed
- Murad as Thakur Ranveer Singh
- Yakub as Mirza
- Achala Sachdev as Dr. Renuka Roy
- Pratima Devi as Nirmala's Mother
- Minoo Mumtaz as Guest Artist
- Kusum as Guest Artist
- Roop Mala as Guest Artist
- Jawahar Kaul as Barrister Ratanlal
- Sardul Singh Kwatra as Sikh man in college classroom
- Kusum as Guest Artist
- Roop Mala as Guest Artist
- Jawahar Kaul as Barrister Ratanlal Roy
- Chand Burque
- Paro
- Daya Devi
- Uma Dutt
- Sagar
- Kamal
- Ram Lal
- Ravi Kant
- Sushila Rani
- Master Sehgal
- Gajinder Narula

== Music ==
Lyrics of the songs are written by Rajendra Krishan and are composed by Madan Mohan.

Song	Singer	Raga
"Unko Yeh Shikayat Hai"	Lata Mangeshkar	Malgunji
"Yun Hasraton Ke Daag"	Lata Mangeshkar	
"Jana Tha Humse Door"	Lata Mangeshkar	
"Ja Ja Re Ja Sajna"	Lata Mangeshkar, Asha Bhosle	
"Jab Din Haseen Dil Ho Jawan Kyun Na Manayen"	Asha Bhosle, Mohammed Rafi	
"Zameen Se Hamen Aasman Par Bithake"	Asha Bhosle, Mohammed Rafi	
"Dupatta Mera Malmal Ka Rang Saleti Halka"	Asha Bhosle, Geeta Dutt	
