= Samuel Martin Burke =

Pakistani civil servant and historian (1906–2010)

- Born: 3 July 1906; Martinpur, Punjab, British India (now in Pakistan)
- Died: 9 October 2010 (aged 104); Karachi, Sindh, Pakistan
- Occupations: Diplomat; historian; professor
- Family: Burke-Singh family
- Honours: Sitara-e-Pakistan

Samuel Martin Burke or S. M. Burke (3 July 1906 – 9 October 2010) was a Pakistani civil servant, diplomat, historian and professor. He was honoured with the Sitara-e-Pakistan by the Government of Pakistan.

== Early life and education ==
Samuel Burke was born in a Punjabi Christian family of twelve brothers and sisters in Martinpur, a village in the Punjab Province of British India, near present-day Faisalabad (then Lyallpur).

His grandfather Chaudhry Allah Ditta was a convert to Christianity, while his father Janab Khairuddin, the first graduate from his village, was a school headmaster who wrote Urdu poetry under the pen name Burq (lightning), which was later Anglicised as Burke. His sister was the Indian Hindi and Punjabi film actress Chand Burke, who appeared in several films during the 1950s and 1960s, including Raj Kapoor's Boot Polish (1954), making him the grand-uncle of the Indian actor Ranveer Singh.

Having passed his matriculation in the first division and secured a government scholarship, Burke studied at Government College, Lahore, specialising in history, philosophy, Persian and Urdu, and earned a BA (Hons) and later an MA in history. He passed the Indian Civil Service (ICS) examination in 1931 and trained for two years in England, reportedly at the School of Oriental Studies in London, in administration and law, before taking up administrative and judicial positions, including a term as a High Court judge.

== Career ==
=== Civil servant ===
In 1946, Burke chaired a three-member Election Petitions Committee for the Punjab, established to consider appeals against the results of the December 1945 provincial election, a contest between the Indian National Congress and the All-India Muslim League. He was a member of the Indian Civil Service until 15 August 1947, when he became the only Asian officer to choose retirement rather than continue in the service of either India or Pakistan, a decision he attributed to a wish to preserve his impartiality while the election committee was still sitting. Following independence, both the Congress and the Muslim League reportedly invited him to return to government service; since he had been born in the territory that became Pakistan, he chose to serve there. He joined the Foreign Service of Pakistan and was appointed counsellor at the Pakistani High Commission in London in 1949.

=== Diplomat ===
Burke served as secretary to the Pakistani delegation at the Inter-Dominion Conferences with India in 1948 and 1949, and as counsellor at the Pakistani High Commission in London from 1949 to 1952. He served as a minister at the Pakistani embassy in Washington, D.C., from 1952 to 1953, during which he also led special missions to the Dominican Republic and Mexico. In 1953, he became the first Pakistani Christian to head a diplomatic mission when he was appointed minister to Sweden, concurrently accredited to Norway, Denmark and Finland, a position he held until 1956. He also served as chargé d'affaires in Rio de Janeiro and deputy high commissioner in London, both in 1953, before his appointment as Pakistan's ambassador to Thailand (also accredited to Cambodia and Laos) from 1956 to 1959, and finally as high commissioner to Canada from 1959 to 1961, after which he retired from the foreign service.

=== Academic ===
Upon retirement, Burke became a professor at the University of Minnesota, a position he held from 1961 to 1975. He authored a number of books covering Pakistan's history and foreign policy.

== Awards ==
- Sitara-e-Pakistan, conferred by President Ayub Khan.

== Books ==
1. Pakistan's Foreign Policy: An Historical Analysis (1973)
2. Mainsprings of Indian and Pakistani Foreign Policy (1974)
3. Akbar, the Greatest Mogul (1989)
4. Bahadur Shah, the Last Mogul Emperor of India (1995)
5. The British Raj in India: An Historical Review (1995), co-written with Salim al-Din Quraishi
6. Quaid-i-Azam Mohammad Ali Jinnah: His Personality and his Politics (1997)
