= Pind Di Kurhi (1963 film) =

1963 film

- Directed by: Baldev R. Jhingan
- Screenplay by: Mulk Raj Bhakhri
- Story by: Baldev R. Jhingan
- Produced by: Rajkumar Kohli
- Starring: Ravinder Kapoor; Nishi; Khairati; Maruti; Wasti; Tun Tun
- Edited by: Shyam
- Music by: Hansraj Behl
- Release date: 1963
- Country: India
- Language: Punjabi

Pind Di Kurhi (Punjabi: ਪਿੰਡ ਦੀ ਕੁੜੀ), also spelled Pind Di Kudi or Pind Di Kurri, is a 1963 Punjabi film, directed by Baldev R. Jhingan, starring Ravinder Kapoor, Nishi, Wasti, Khairati, Maruti, Tun Tun.

== Music ==
Hansraj Behl composed the music for playback singers Mohammad Rafi, Lata Mangeshkar, Shamshad Begum, Asha Bhosle, Mahinder Kapoor, and Minu Purshottam. Verma Malik wrote the lyrics.

#	Song	Singer
1	Laiya Te Tod Nibhaveen, Chhadh Ke Na Jaaveen	Lata Mangeshkar, Mahendra Kapoor
2	"Haal Paraya"	Asha Bhosle, Shamshad Begum
3	"Dil Da Chor"	Shamshad Begum
4	"Kattian Karoon Teri Roon"	Shamshad Begum
5	"Teri Meri Ik Jindadi"	Mohammed Rafi, Shamshad Begum

== See also ==
- Pind Di Kurhi (2005 film)
