= Suresh (Hindi actor) =

Film actor from India (1928-1979)

- Born: Naseem Ahmed; 13 November 1928
- Died: 14 July 1979 (aged 49)
- Occupations: Actor, producer,
- Years active: 1929, 1937-1979

Suresh (born as Naseem Ahmed; 13 November 1928 – 14 July 1979), also known as N. A. Suresh, was an Indian actor in Bollywood, who was born in Gurdaspur, Punjab, India.

He acted in Hindi/Hindustani and Punjabi films from 1941 to 1979.

== Early life ==
Suresh started as a child artiste in 1929 as baby Krishna in Gopal Krishna and as a child artiste in Nishan-e-Jung in 1937. His early films were Anjan (1941), Naya Sansar (1941) and Basant (1942).

== Films as a hero ==
In the 1950s, he was cast as a leading actor opposite the main heroines of those times, including Madhubala, Suraiya, Vyjayanthimala, and Geeta Bali. He was chosen as a hero by producer/director A. R. Kardar in many of his films, including Dulari (1949) opposite Madhubala, Jadoo (1951) opposite Nalini Jaywant, Deewana (1952) opposite Suraiya and Yasmin opposite Vyjanthimala. In Qaidi, Padmini was his heroine and in Teen Ustad (1961), he teamed up with Ameeta as his heroine. Shyama acted as the female lead opposite Suresh in Char Chand (1953). Suresh and Nigar Sultana were the leading pair of Rishta (1954) and Suresh and Usha Kiran acted as lead pair in Dost (1954). He produced movie Ganga Aur Suraj (1980), stars Sunil Dutt & Shashi Kapoor, released after his death.

For two years, Suresh went to Pakistan and acted in two films in 1950 and 1951, but then returned to India.

== Later films ==
After 1961, his popularity declined and he acted in supporting roles of films like Love Marriage, Mere Humsafar, Dillagi, Brahmachari, Parde Ke Peechay and many more.

He acted in over 55 films. He produced a film, Ganga aur Sooraj (1980), starring Sunil Dutt, Shashi Kapoor and Reena Roy, which over-ran its budget, because of the ill health of its original main villain, Anwar Hussain and rendered Suresh considerably weak financially. The film was released in 1980, after his death in 1979, aged 50.

He is most known for his role in Dulari (1949), especially in the song "Suhani Raat Dhal Chuki" by Mohammed Rafi.

== Filmography ==
| Title | Year | Country | Producer | Director | Notes |
|---|---|---|---|---|---|
| Gopal Krishna | 1929 | India | ---- | Rajaram Vankudre Shantaram | Child actor |
| Gangavataran | 1937 | India | Kolhapur Cinetone | Dadasaheb Phalke | Child actor |
| Nishan-E-Jung | 1937 | India | Prince M. | A. R. Kabul | |
| Bazigar | 1938 | India | Ranjit Film Company | Manibhai Vyas | |
| Meri Ankhen | 1938 | India | Meri Ankhen | Meri Ankhen | |
| Taqdeer Ki Tope | 1939 | India | Bharat Laxmi Pictures | V. Panchotia | |
| Thokar | 1939 | India | Ranjit Film Company | Kardar | |
| Bandhanhttps://myswar.co/film_actor/suresh | 1940 | India | Bombay Talkies | N. R. Acharya | |
| Diwali | 1940 | India | Ranjit Film Company | Jayant Desai | |
| Anjan | 1941 | India | Bombay Talkies | Amiya Chakraborty | |
| Naya Sansar | 1941 | India | Bombay Talkies | N. R. Acharya | |
| Basant | 1942 | India | Bombay Talkies | Amiya Chakraborty | |
| Bairam Khan | 1946 | India | Standard Pictures | Jagirdar | |
| Sohni Mahiwal | 1946 | India | New Bombay Theatre | R. D. Pareenja | |
| Sona Chandi | 1946 | India | New Bombay Theatre | R. D. Pareenja | |
| Rang Mahal | 1948 | India | Eastern Pictures | Pt. Anand Kumar | |
| Dulari | 1949 | India | Kardar Production | A. R. Kardar | |
| Dastan | 1950 | India | Kardar Production | A. R. Kardar | |
| Do Kinaray | 1950 | Pakistan | Rashid Butt | Ashiq Bhatti | |
| Bade Bhaiyahttps://myswar.co/film_actor/suresh | 1951 | India | Super Pictures | Aspi Irani | |
| Eid | 1951 | Pakistan | Najmul Hassan | N. Hasan | |
| Jadoo | 1951 | India | Musical Pictures | A.R.Kardar | |
| Deewana | 1952 | India | Kardar Production | A.R.Kardar | |
| Goonj | 1952 | India | Kwarta Art Production | Phani Majumdar | |
| Zamane Ki Hawa | 1952 | India | Punjab Films | Walli | |
| Bahadur | 1953 | India | Ranjit Film Company | Ratibhai Punatkar | |
| Char Chand | 1953 | India | Fine Art Films | A. Karim | |
| Dost | 1954 | India | Kuldip Pictures | Rajendra Sharma | |
| Haar-Jeet | 1954 | India | Filmkraft | Jaggi Rampal | |
| Rishta | 1954 | India | Rajasthan Production | Aslam | |
| Yasmin | 1955 | India | Musical Pictures | A. R. Kardar | |
| Captain Kishore | 1957 | India | Wadia Movietone | J. B. H. Wadia | |
| Neelofar | 1957 | India | All India Pictures | P. N. Arora | |
| Qaidi | 1957 | India | Eagle Films | Mohamed Hussain | |
| Aji Bas Shukriya | 1958 | India | Eagle Films | Mohamed Hussain | |
| Ten O'clock | 1958 | India | Niagara Pictures | Jugal Kishore | as hero, opposite Geeta Bali |
| Ghar Ghar Ki Baat | 1959 | India | Shah Pictures | Ravindra Dave | as hero, opposoite Minu Mumtaz |
| Madam X.Y.Z. | 1959 | India | Neo Lite Films | Nanabhai Bhatt | as hero, opposite Shakila |
| Satta Bazaar | 1959 | India | Nagina Films | Ravindra Dave | Suresh opposite Vijaya Chaudhri, as lead supporting pair |
| Tipu Sultan | 1959 | India | Global Films | Jagdish Gautam | Suresh opposite Anita Guha |
| Love Marriage | 1959 | India | Subodh Mukherjee | Subodh Mukherjee | |
| Zara Bach Ke | 1959 | India | Rafiq Arabi | N. A. Ansari | as hero opposite Nanda |
| Aanchal | 1960 | India | Panchdeep Chitra | Vasant Joglekar | |
| Teen Ustad | 1961 | India | Balwant Bhatt | Nanabhai Bhatt | |
| Wazir-E-Azam | 1961 | India | R. S. Rahi | R. S. Rahi | as hero opposite Nadira |
| Saranga | 1961 | India | as hero opposite Jaishree Gadkar | | |
| Dhol Jani (Punjabi film) | 1962 | India | Mulk Raj bhakri | Rajesh nanda | as hero opposite Nishi |
| Sacche Moti | 1962 | India | Shri Dilip Chitra | Omi Bedi | as hero with Jabeen Jalil |
| Aap Ki Parchhaiyan | 1964 | India | Emkay Production | Mohan Kumar | as lead supporting actor opposite Shashikala |
| Majboor | India | De Luxe Films | Narendra Suri | as supporting actor | |
| Sher Afghan | 1966 | India | Shanker Movies | B. R. Jhingan | |
| Yeh Raat Phir Na Aayegi | 1966 | India | | Brij Sadanah | as dencer |
| Aman | 1967 | India | Emkay Production | Mohan Kumar | as lead supporting actor |
| Duniya | 1967 | India | Time Life Films | T. Prakash Rao | as lead supporting actor |
| Nanak Nam Jahaz Hai(Punjabi Movie)) | 1969 | India | Panna Lal Maheshwary | Ram Maheshwary | as Prem Singh |
| Nannha Farishta | 1969 | India | Vijaya International | T. Prakash Rao | as police officer |
| Aansoo Aur Muskan | 1970 | India | B. Anthaswami | P. Madhavan | |
| Mere Humsafar | 1970 | India | Yusuf Teendarwajawala | Dulal Guha | Truck driver |
| Dost Aur Dushman | 1971 | India | Kewal Mishra | Kewal Mishra | |
| Raja Rani | 1973 | India | Jagdish Kumar | Sachin Bhaumick | |
| Resham Ki Dori | 1974 | India | T.C. Dewan | Atma Ram | |
| Sewak | 1975 | India | Zial Hasan Production | S. M. Abbas | |
| Adalat | 1976 | India | ???? | Narendra Bedi | |
| Ganga Aur Suraj | 1980 | India | Suresh | Suresh | as a Khan |
