= Qaidi (1957 film) =

- Directed by: Mohammed Hussain
- Written by: Akhtar Mirza
- Produced by: FC Mehra
- Starring: Suresh; Padmini; Ragini; Johnny Walker; Helen; Agha
- Cinematography: A. K. Ramnoth
- Edited by: FC Mehra
- Music by: O. P. Nayyar
- Distributed by: Eagle Productions
- Release date: 1957
- Running time: 170 mins
- Country: India
- Language: Hindi

Qaidi is a 1957 Bollywood film starring Suresh, Padmini, Ragini, Johnny Walker. The music was composed by O. P. Nayyar.

The film was dubbed into Tamil with the title Magudam Katha Mangai and released in 1957. K. V. Mahadevan composed the music for the Tamil version. A. Maruthakasi wrote the lyrics.

== Plot ==
Laila's greedy father Jabir takes her to Samarna to separate her from handsome, young good-for-nothing Murad. Murad, who is deeply in love with dancer Laila follows her there.

Laila and her people help the villainous Anwar kidnap his cousin the Crown Prince just before the Royal Coronation. Believing that the Prince has been murdered, Anwar rejoices that he will soon be King. However, the Wazir is worried. He sends his trusted men, Shiraji and Abul Hassan to look for the Prince. While they are searching, they encounter Murad, who strongly resembles the Prince. They persuade Murad to disguise himself as the Prince until the real Prince is located. Murad is then escorted to the palace. Anwar is shocked to see his plans go down the drain. The Coronation takes place as planned. Afterward, Murad's true identity is revealed and Anwar's hopes are rekindled. Anwar challenges Murad to a duel, hoping to kill his rival, but Murad fights skilfully, leaving Anwar gravely wounded. Amid this scene, the real Prince enters the room. He reveals his how his lookalike Murad had cleverly won over Laila to save the Prince, and how he had escaped to Baghdad. Anwar succumbs to his injuries. The Prince is crowned. Murad and Laila marry and live happily ever after.

== Cast ==
- Suresh as Murad/ Crown Prince
- Padmini as Laila
- Ragini as Laila's friend
- Johnny Walker as a tramp
- Agha as Abul Hassan

== Music ==
The songs for this film were composed by O. P. Nayyar. The lyrics were penned by Sahir Ludhianvi.

Song	Singer
"O Saiyan, Ja Ja Ja"	Asha Bhosle
"Kuch To Aisi Baat Kar"	Asha Bhosle
"Humse Bhi Aate Jate"	Asha Bhosle
"Chahe Tu Na Bata"	Asha Bhosle
"Chhaya Hai Sama, Mera Dil Hai Jawan"	Asha Bhosle, Mohammed Rafi
"Yun Muskurake Samne Aaya Na Kijiye"	Asha Bhosle, Mohammed Rafi
"Bedardi Preet Nahin Jani, Main To Roothi Sajanwa"	Asha Bhosle, Usha Mangeshkar
"Dekh Li Teri Ada"	Shamshad Begum

=== Tamil Songs ===
All the songs in Tamil were composed by K. V. Mahadevan and lyrics were penned by A. Maruthakasi. Playback singers are T. A. Mothi, Jikki & K. Jamuna Rani.

No.	Song	Singers	Lyrics	Length (m:ss)
1	"Aaha...Ennai Paar Manna "	T. A. Mothi & Jikki	A. Maruthakasi	04:21
2	"O..Mohana Senthamarai Aadathe"	T. A. Mothi & Jikki	A. Maruthakasi	04:08
3	"Perazhagi Premai Kalairani"	Jikki & K. Jamuna Rani	A. Maruthakasi	03:04
4	"Unthan Kaathal Pathai"	Jikki	A. Maruthakasi	03:20
5	"Anbe Ennai Paartha Pinnal"	Jikki	A. Maruthakasi	03:01
6	"Amma Pen Ange Inge"	Jikki	A. Maruthakasi	03:02
7	"Kathai Sollamale Murai"	Jikki	A. Maruthakasi	03:01
8	"Kurumbai Ennai Parkaathe"	Jikki	A. Maruthakasi	03:43
