= Dost (1954 film) =

1954 film

- Directed by: Rajendra Sharma
- Produced by: Kuldip Sehgal; Kuldeep Pictures
- Starring: Suresh; Usha Kiran
- Music by: Hansraj Behl; Verma Malik (lyricist)
- Release date: 1954
- Country: India
- Language: Hindi

For other films, see Dost (disambiguation)

Dost (Devanagari: दोस्त; Nastaliq: دوست; translation: Friend) is a 1954 Hindi film produced by Kuldip Sehgal for Kuldip Pictures and directed by Rajendra Sharma.

This film stars Suresh and Usha Kiran in lead roles with Om Prakash, Kammo, Khairati, Mohna, Majnu, Ramesh Thakur, Randhir, S. Kapoor, S. Nazir and Uma Dutt in support cast.

The film song lyrics for this film were written by Verma Malik with Hansraj Behl composing the music.

== Cast ==
- Suresh
- Usha Kiran
- Om Prakash
- Randhir
- Mohana Cabral

== Crew ==
- Director – Rajendra Sharma
- Producer – Kuldip Sehgal
- Production Company – Kuldeep Pictures
- Music Director – Hansraj Behl
- Lyricist – Verma Malik
- Playback Singers – Madhubala Zaveri, Talat Mahmood

== Soundtrack ==
All lyrics are written by Verma Malik; all music is composed by Hansraj Behl.

No.	Title	Singer(s)	Length
1.	"Aaye Bhi Akela, Jaye Bhi Akela, Do Din Ki Zindagi Hai, Do Din Ka Mela"	Talat Mahmood	3:35
2.	"Aye Zamane Bata Do"	Talat Mahmood, Madhubala Zaveri	3:25
3.	"Dil Deke Bohut Pachhtaaye, Ke Sara Jug Beri Ho Gaya"	Madhubala Zaveri	3:45
