= Lala Rookh =

1958 film

- Directed by: Akhtar Siraj
- Based on: Lalla Rookh by Thomas Moore
- Produced by: Ismat Chughtai
- Starring: Talat Mahmood; Shyama
- Music by: Khayyam; Film song lyrics by Kaifi Azmi
- Release date: 1958
- Country: India
- Language: Hindi

Lala Rookh is a 1958 Indian Hindi-language romantic drama film directed by Akhtar Siraj, starring Talat Mahmood and Shyama in lead roles.

It is based on Thomas Moore's 1817 poem Lalla Rookh about a fictional daughter of the Mughal emperor Aurangzeb.

== Cast ==
- Talat Mahmood as Shah Murad
- Shyama as Shehzadi

== Soundtrack ==
Film musical score is by Khayyam and the film song lyrics by Kaifi Azmi:

Song	Singer
"Hai Kali Kali Ki Lab Par Tere Husn Ka Fasana"	Mohammed Rafi
"Thi Ek Shehzadi"	Talat Mahmood
"Aana Hi Padega"	Talat Mahmood
"Pyas Kuch Aur Bhi Bhadkaa Di Jhalak Dikhlake" (Duet)	Talat Mahmood, Asha Bhosle
"Pyas Kuch Aur Bhi" (Solo)	Asha Bhosle
"Alvida Jaan-E-Wafa"	Asha Bhosle
"Le Ja Meri Duaen"	Asha Bhosle
