= Main Jatti Punjab Di =

1964 film

Main Jatti Punjab di
- Directed by: Baldev S. Jhingan
- Produced by: Rajkumar Kohli
- Starring: Premnath; Nishi; Jeevan (Hindi actor); Marutirao Parab; Tun Tun; Manmohan Krishna; Kharati; Madan Puri; Achla Sachdev; Madhumati
- Music by: Husnlal Bhagatram
- Release date: 1964
- Country: India
- Language: Punjabi

Main Jatti Punjab Di is a romantic Punjabi film released in 1964. The film was directed by Baldev S. Jhingan.

== Plot ==
Preeto (Nishi) is a beautiful girl with a handicapped father and a dead mother. She loves her father and takes responsibility of farming in their fields. She falls in love with a handsome boy, Prem (Premnath). Ramlal, the villain of the film, becomes Prem's rival as he also wants to marry Preeto. Ramlal complains to Prem's father about the love affair of Prem and Preeto. After some drama, Preeto's father considers it a matter of dishonour and gets angry with his daughter and dies after falling from the stairs. Prem's father (Jeevan) fixes Prem's marriage with a rich girl. Ramlal kidnaps Preeto and Prem mistakes his father as a kidnapper and after searching for Preeto, he finds the truth. In the climax, Ramlal takes Prem and Preeto at gunpoint, then Prem's father shoots Ramlal and agrees to the marriage of Prem and Preeto.

== Cast ==
- Premnath
- Nishi
- Jeevan (Hindi actor)
- Madan Puri
- Tun Tun
- Kharaiti
- Maruti Rao
- Achla Sachdev
- Manmohan Krishna
- Madhumati
- Lata Arora
- Paul Sharma
- Kanwal Nain
- Misra
- Kailash
- Kaka
- Gaije
- Mamaji

== Songs ==
Lyrics by Verma Malik sung by Asha Bhosle, Mahendra Kapoor, Shamshad Begum, Usha Mangeshkar, Suman Kalyanpur, S. Balbir:

1. "Main jatti Punjab di, meri..."
2. "Main sara Punjab gah laya..."
3. Parody song
