= Nishani =

Nishani is a surname. Notable people with the surname include:

- Omer Nishani (1887–1954), President of Albania (1943–1953)
- Bujar Nishani (born 1966), President of Albania (2012–2017)
