= Indira Billi =

Indian actress (1936–2025)

- Born: Indira Kaur; 6 August 1936; Dina Nagar, Gurdaspur district, Punjab Province, British India
- Died: 16 June 2025 (aged 88)
- Other names: Indira Billi, Indra Billi
- Occupations: Actress in Hindi and Punjabi films

Indira Billi (6 August 1936 – 16 June 2025) was an Indian actress of Hindi and Punjabi language films.

== Early life and career ==
Born as Indira Kaur on 6 August 1936 at Dina Nagar, Gurdaspur district, Punjab, British India, she acted in many Punjabi films as a heroine and played minor roles in many Hindi films.

Indira Billi, as a child, grew up in Kharian, Gujrat District, Punjab, British India, now in Pakistan, when her family lived there before the Partition of India in 1947. Then her family migrated to India and settled in Kanpur, Uttar Pradesh. However, her family later moved to Bombay in 1952 where her elder brother ran a business.

Due to her beauty and big blue eyes, she was noticed by many film studio people, when she visited them and was offered film roles. Her namesake actress Indira Bansal was also active in the film industry, when she first started acting. So filmmakers chose to call her 'Indira Billi' due to her blue eyes.

== Personal life and death ==
Billi married Shiv Kumar Mehra who owned Kumar Talkies and was from an affluent family of Delhi. After her marriage, she retired and quit the film world to fully devote herself to the home life and to her family.

Billi died on 16 June 2025, at the age of 88.

== Filmography (selected) ==
=== Punjabi ===
1. Kiklee (1960)
2. Yamla Jatt (1960)
3. Do Lachhian (1960)
4. Chambe Di Kali (1960) Chambi
5. Billo (1961)
6. Khedan De Din Char (1962)
7. Lado Rani (1963)
8. Jagga (1964)
9. Mama Ji (1964)... as Laali
10. Sassi Punnu (1965 film)... as Sassi
11. Shehar Di Kudi (1966)
12. Neem Hakeem (1967)
13. Pardesan (1969)......as Nikki
14. Dupatta (1970)
15. Kankan De Ohle (1971)
16. Patola (1973)

=== Urdu/Hindi ===
1. Shri Ganesh Mahima (1950) as Rukmini
2. Rangeela (1953)
3. Faraar (1955)
4. Milap (1955)
5. Shree 420 (1955)
6. Jawab (1955)
7. Basant Bahar (1956)
8. Laxmi (1957)... actors in theatre
9. Paristan (1957)
10. Yahudi (1958)... as Yasmin
11. Forty Days (1959)
12. Dil Deke Dekho (1959)
13. Lalach (1960)
14. Lucky Number (1961)
15. Asli-Naqli (1962).. as Indira
16. Meri Surat Teri Ankhen(1963) as Bela
17. Fauladi Mukka (1965)as Anguri
18. Mujrim Kaun Khooni Kaun (1965)
19. Do Dil (1965) ..as Radhika
20. Teen Sardar (1965) ..as Rukhsana
21. Professor Aur Jadugar (1966)
22. Ali Baba aur 40 Chor (1966)
23. Phool Aur Patthar (1966)
24. Badrinath Yatra (1967) ..as Chandra
25. Mere Huzoor (1968)
