= Shah Ji =

Indian Islamic scholar

Akhtar Moeed Shah Al-Abidi
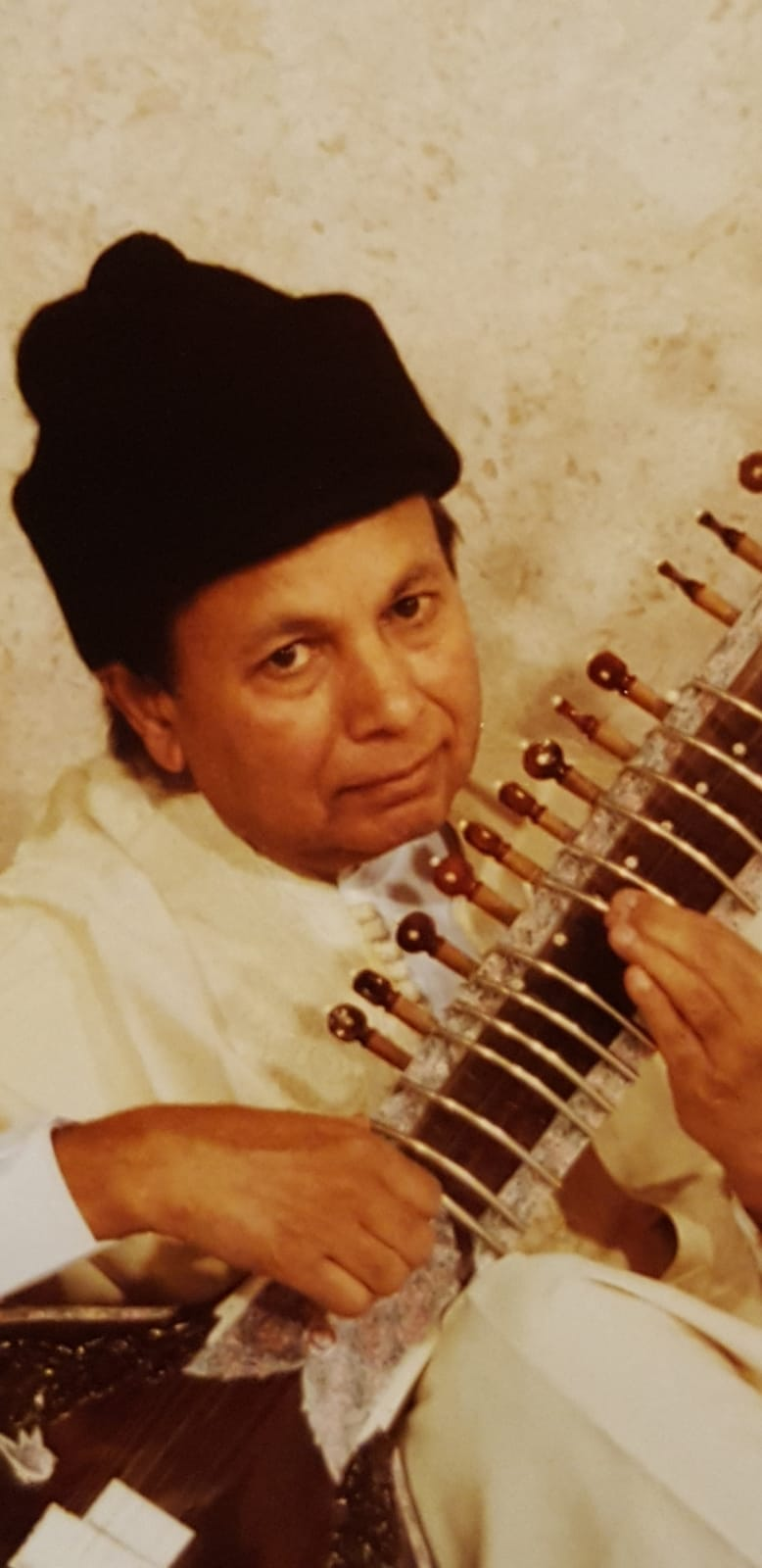
- Akhtar Moeed Shah Al-Abidi pictured playing the sitar

Personal life
- Died: 2010 United Kingdom
- Resting place: Manchester, England
- Citizenship: British
- Era: Modern era
- Region: South Asia
- Main interest(s): Islamic theology, Hadith, Tafsir, Fiqh, Urdu poetry, Tasawwuf

Religious life
- Religion: Islam

Muslim leader
- Successor: Raza Ali Shah Al-Abidi
- Website: http://sufiguidance.com

Akhtar Moeed Shah Al-Abidi (Urdu: اختر معید شاہ العابدی), commonly referred to as Shah Ji, was an Indian Muslim and influential scholar who belonged to the Syed (or Sayyid) lineage.

== Biography ==
Shah Ji [Akhtar Moeed Shah Al-Abidi] was born and raised in Saharanpur, India, then migrated to Karachi, Pakistan after the Partition of India in 1947. In the early 1960s he settled in England; first Manchester then later moved to Slough finally returning to Manchester where he spent the remainder of his life.

He was known for his spiritual healing abilities through his understanding of ancient Islamic jurisprudence (fiqh), numerology (or abjad calculations) and the Arabic alphabet. His main desire in life was to spread knowledge from the Quran and modern tafsir to all those seeking closeness to Allah and to better understand Islamic Mysticism. Shah Ji was able to help people around the world and his endeavors were highlighted in many newspapers and local media outlets. He travelled frequently to the Middle East, Africa and Europe where his efforts, relevant to faith healing, original Islamic writings, and propagation of compassion and humanity in the world have been discussed in the media.

Shah Ji died in 2010 and the anniversary of his passing is commemorated each year with events similar to the dhikr and halaqa Shah Ji previously hosted himself.

== Published works ==
Published literature by Akhtar Moeed Shah Al-Abidi include:

- Seerat-e-Mohammed, Mohammed-e-Arabee (Urdu and English, 2005)
- Divine Prophecy Divine (2002)
- Mathematical Mysteries of Alphabets (2007)
