= Lachhi =

1949 film

Lachhi (1949 film)
- Directed by: Rajendra Sharma
- Screenplay by: Mulk Raj Bhakri
- Produced by: Kuldip Sehgal
- Starring: Wasti, Manorama, Randhir, Majnu, Sofia & Om Prakash
- Cinematography: Gyan Shankar
- Music by: Hansraj Behl
- Release date: 1949
- Country: India
- Language: Punjabi

Lachhi (Punjabi: ਲੱਛੀ) is a 1949 Indian Punjabi language film. This film was a big hit and a commercial success.

Hansraj Behl composed the music and Mulk Raj Bhakri penned the film songs lyrics.

== Cast ==
- Manorama
- Wasti
- Randhir
- Majnu
- Om Prakash

== Popular film songs ==
Mohammad Rafi, Lata Mangeshkar, Shamshad Begum and S.Balbir were the lead playback singers.

Song title	Sung by	Lyrics by	Music by	Film notes
Naale Lammi Te Naale Kaali, Haaye Ve Channa Raat Judaaian Waali	Lata Mangeshkar	Mulk Raj Bhakri	Hansraj Behl	These 3 film songs here were big hits among the public and are still popular today.
Meri Laggdi Kisey Na Vekhi, Te Tuttdi Nu Jagg Jaanda	Shamshad Begum	Mulk Raj Bhakri	Hansraj Behl	
Jag Wala Mela Yaaro Thodi Daer Da, Hassdian Raat Langi Pata Nahin Saver Da	Mohammad Rafi	Nazim Panipat	Hansraj Behl	

== See also ==
- Do Lachhian
- Bhangra
