= Chand Burke =

Indian character actress (1932–2008)

- Born: 2 February 1932; Lyallpur, Punjab, British India
- Died: 28 December 2008 (aged 76)
- Occupation: Actress
- Spouse(s): Niranjan (Divorced in 1954); Sundar Singh Bhavnani (1955)
- Children: 2
- Family: Burke-Singh family

Chand Burke (2 February 1932 – 28 December 2008), also known as Chand Burque, was an Indian character actress in Hindi and Punjabi language films.

== Career ==
Chand Burke made her debut in Maheshwari Productions’ Kahan Gaye (1946). Chand appeared in a number of films made in Lahore, and was widely known as “the Dancing Lily of the Punjab.” The Partition of India led to her migration to Mumbai (then Bombay) thus adversely affecting her career.

She was given her first break in Bollywood by the veteran actor Raj Kapoor in the film titled, Boot Polish (1954), where she played the pivotal role of Baby Naaz and Rattan Kumar's tormenting aunt.

== Personal life ==
Burke was born in a Punjabi Christian family of twelve brothers and sisters in the Punjab Province of British India (in what is now Pakistan). Her grandfather Chaudhry Allah Ditta was a convert to Christianity while her father Janab Khairuddin, the first graduate from his village, was a school headmaster who wrote Urdu poetry under the pen name Burq (lightning), which later would be Anglicized as Burke. Her brother, Samuel Martin Burke, was civil servant who later became a diplomat to the Scandinavian countries for Pakistan. After divorcing her film writer-director husband Niranjan in 1954, she married businessman Sundar Singh Bhavnani in 1955 with whom she had a daughter named Tonya and a son named Jagjit, who is the father of film actor Ranveer Singh.

== Filmography ==
Year	Film	Role	Notes
1969	Pardesan	Rakhi	
1968	Kahin Din Kahin Raat	Pran's scientist assistant	
1967	Mera Bhai Mera Dushman	Rajan's wife	
1965	Mohabbat Isko Kahete Hain	Kundan's mother	
1964	Apne Huye Paraye	Rampyari	
1960	Ghar Ki Laaj	Moti's aunty	
1960	Rangeela Raja	Madhuri	
1960	Shravan Kumar	Jamuna	
1959	Pardesi Dhola	Reshma	
1958	Adalat	Urmila	
1958	Lajwanti	Actress	Uncredited
1958	Sohni Mahiwal	Nargis	
1957	Dushman	Raam Singh's mother	
1956	Basant Bahar	Leelabai	
1955	Raftar	Jaya	
1955	Shahi Chor	Sushma	
1954	Ferry	Elizabeth	
1954	Amar Kirtan	Nirmala	
1954	Gul Bahar	Nirupa	
1954	Boot Polish	Kamla Devi	
1954	Vanjara	Sati	
1953	Aag Ka Dariya	Actress	Uncredited
1953	Kaude Shah	Poonam	Punjabi film
1951	Sabz Baag	Zubeida	
1951	Posti	Bhag Bhari	Punjabi film
1948	Dukhiyari	Sati	
1946	Kahan Gaye	Salma	
