= Vashti Clarke =

Jamaican model, actress, and entrepreneur

Vashtie C Clarke
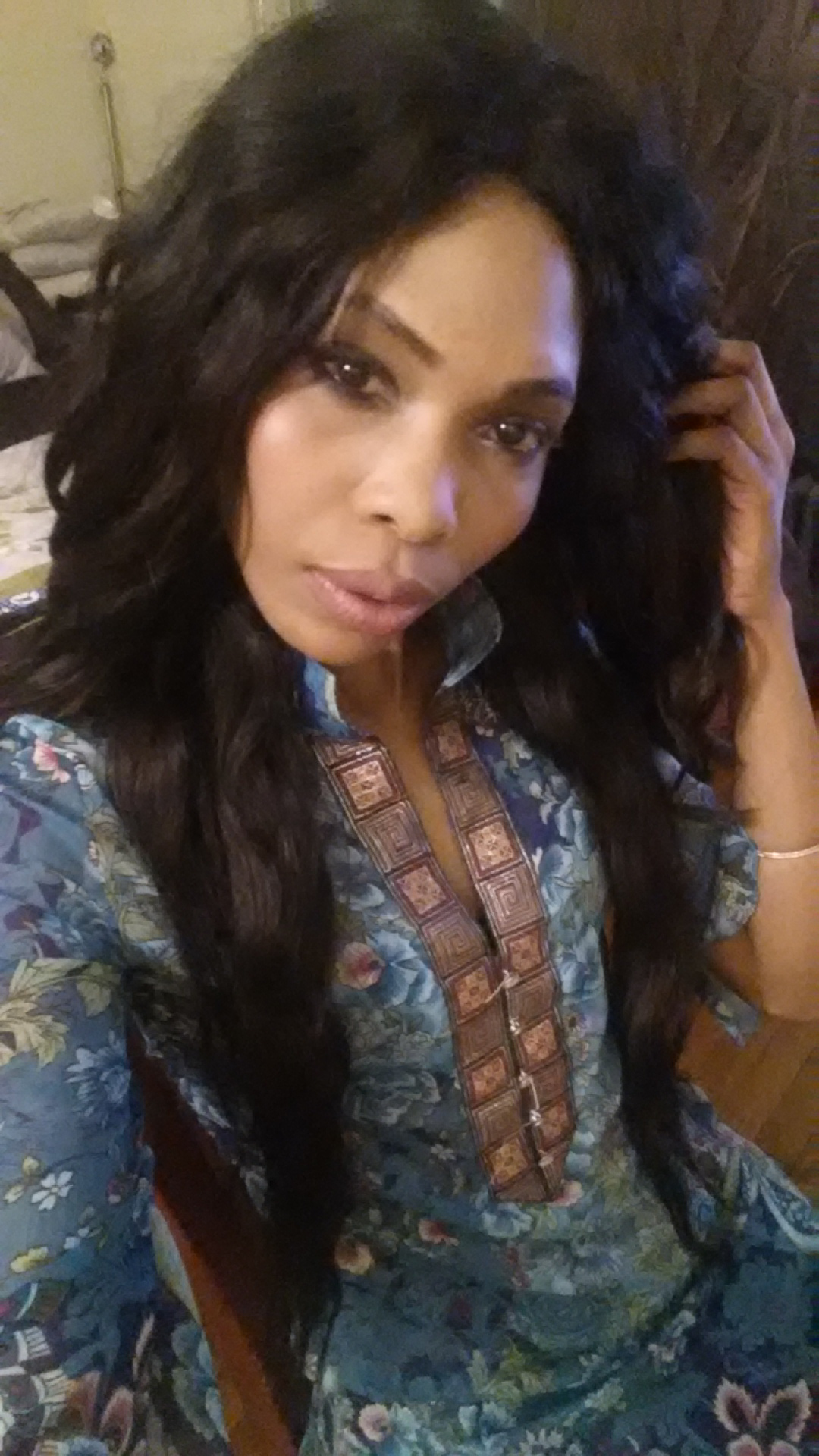
- Clarke behind the scenes on set for a photoshoot in 2015
- Born: St. Mary, Jamaica
- Other name: Rhea
- Occupations: Model, entrepreneur
- Years active: 2000–present

Vashti Cordella Clarke is a Jamaican model, actress, and entrepreneur who resides in New York City. Recruited at the age of 17 she established her career in her home country of Jamaica while appearing in advertisements, features in The x-News, The Star Poster Girl and walking in tons of Fashion Event all over the Island.

== Career ==
=== 2005–2010 ===
With the experience and knowledge of the business, she took her career in her own hands and in February 2006, Pyoise Modeling Agency was born.

=== 2010–present ===
2010 Clarke started breaking through in the US Market as she got back in her career, These efforts didn't bear fruits until a few years later. While eying the US market, she had the opportunity to work with brands such as: Femheka, Island Gems Jewelry . She later added a new hip high fashion event to the Jamaican roster dubbed; Fashion Weeks End, where at the end of the fashion weeks around the world, she in conjunction with Pyoise Modeling Agency hosted a weekend of fashion, last one being held at Hope Botanical Gardens lawn.

In 2015–2016 Clarke has represented some major brands, during New York Fashion Week she booked 11 shows and represented the likes of: Yeroc by Corey Woods, Nolah Elan, Park Ave, Style Fashion Week for Chuks Collins, Anthony Eastwick, Emigee x Sakarah, Indonesian label Imaji Collection. Her most recent editorial works includes shooting with Lou Freeman, Playboy Magazine, Alexei Afoni for Hype Hair Magazine, and Charles Phox for The Trentonian.

== Charity ==
Clarke is a big supporter of charity and in February 2012 Clarke and Pyoise Models teamed up with Kiwanis Club of Portmore at the Medallion Hall Hotel to put together a fashion Show that raised funds to support their valiant efforts to helping the less fortunate with school books, food and medication. After a brief interview with her, she shared information that she looks to continue her efforts and also plans to do a scholarship program for her alma maters.
