= Gopichand (film) =

1958 Bollywood drama film

Gopichand is a 1958 Bollywood drama film directed by Ishwarlal, starring Shyama and Shahu Modak.

== Cast ==
- Shyama
- Shahu Modak
- Prem Adib
- Durga Khote

== Soundtrack ==
#	Title	Singer(s)
1	"Aaj Sakhi Rang Ghol Ang Ang Raha Dol"	Sudha Malhotra, Sulochana Vyas
2	"Bhar Ke Katora Laya Hu Mai"	Manna Dey
3	"Bikhar Gaya Maya Ka Desh"	Manna Dey
4	"Haule Haule O Ri Hawa Tu Chal"	Asha Bhosle
5	"Naya Hai Suraj Nayi Hai Kirne"	Asha Bhosle
6	"Pal Bhar Naina Khol Jogi Re"	Asha Bhosle
7	"Rut Aaye Rut Jaye Suhagan"	Asha Bhosle
8	"Teri Duniya Maati Ki Re"	Manna Dey
