= Verma Malik =

Film songs lyricist from India (1925-2009)

- Born: Barkatrai Malik; 13 April 1925; Ferozepur, Punjab Province, British India
- Died: 15 March 2009 (aged 83); Juhu, Mumbai, India
- Occupations: Lyricist, poet
- Years active: 1949 – 2001
- Spouse: Kamla
- Children: 1 son, 2 daughters
- Awards: Filmfare Awards for 'Best Lyricist' in 1971 and 1973

Verma Malik (13 April 1925 – 15 March 2009) was a Bollywood film songs lyricist. He was an active freedom fighter during the British Raj. He wrote many patriotic songs and bhajans and recited them immediately prior to penning lyrics for Punjabi and Hindi films.

== Early life and career ==
Born on 13 April 1925 in Ferozpur district, Punjab, British India in a Punjabi Hindu family as Barkatrai Malik. He took his professional name of Verma Malik on the advice of music director Hansraj Behl who helped him in the beginning of his career in the Indian film industry.

In 1953, he married his wife Kamla. He has 1 son and two daughters. Son Rajesh Malik is also a film song writer. Verma Malik penned lyrics for the first time for a song in film Chakori (1949). Later, he wrote songs for other films including Posti (1950 Punjabi-language film), Jaggu (1952), Shree Nagad Narayan (1955), Mirza Sahiban (1957), CID 909 (1957), Taqdeer (1958) and Bhangra (1959 film), another Punjab-language film.

He stayed away from the film industry for almost 7 years after 1961. He then wrote songs for Dil Aur Mohobbat (1967).

His first big break in Hindi-language films was in Yaadgaar (1970) by Manoj Kumar. He is known for writing the song Ek Tara Bole. In the same year, Pehchan (1970) got him much attention and he became a prominent film song lyricist for Bollywood. He wrote nearly 500 film songs during his career.

The songs of Roti Kapda Aur Makaan (1974 film) were the biggest hits of his career. Film song Baaki kuchh bacha tau mehngai maar gayi finished No. 1 in Binaca Geet Mala's 1975 annual ranking. The program's song no. 2 that year was Hai hai yeh majboori from the same film. Both were written by Varma Malik.

== Filmography ==
- Chhai (1950) - a Punjabi language film
- Posti (1950) - a Punjabi-language film
- Kaude Shah (1953) - a Punjabi language film
- Vanjara (1954) -a Punjabi language film
- Dost (1954)
- Mirza Sahiban (1957) - a Punjabi language film
- Taqdeer (1958)
- Ek Armaan Mera - (1959) just one song ( Dil Aap Ka Daulatkhana), sung by Asha Bhosle music by S. D. Batish
- Bhangra (1959) - a Punjabi language film
- Do Lachhian (1959) - a Punjabi language film
- Guddi (1961) - a Punjabi language film
- Main Jatti Punjab Di (1964) - a Punjabi language film
- Mama Ji (1964)- a Punjabi language film
- Pind Di Kuri (1967) - a Punjabi language film
- Dil Aur Mohabbat (1968)
- Pardesan - (1969) Lyrics and Music, Punjabi language film
- Yaadgaar (1970)
- Pehchan (1970)
- Sawan Bhadon (1970)
- Paras (1971)
- Balidan (1971)
- Hum Tum Aur Woh
- Shor (1972)
- Be-Imaan (1972)
- Victoria No. 203 (1972)
- Anhonee (1973)
- Roti Kapda Aur Makaan (1974)
- Ek Se Badhkar Ek (1976)
- Nagin (1976)
- Aadmi Sadak Ka (1977)
- Jaani Dushman (1979)
- Shakka (1981)
- Do Ustad (1982)
- Sanjog (1985)
- Hukumat (1987)
- Waaris (1988 film)

== Awards and recognition ==
- Filmfare Award for Best Lyricist in 1971 for Pehchan (1970 film) and again in 1973 for Be-Imaan (1972 film).

== Death and legacy ==
Verma Malik died on 15 March 2009 at Juhu, Mumbai, India at age 83. He was a close friend of Pyarelal of the film music directors duo Laxmikant–Pyarelal. Pyarelal paid tributes to him by saying that he was a simple man and very proud of his work. He added that Verma Malik could blend traditional Punjabi folk songs into his film songs very well.
