= Shivkumar =

Shivkumar is a given name. Notable people with the name include:

- Shivkumar Chanabasappa Udasi (born 1967), Indian politician
- Shivkumar Joshi (1916–1988), Indian author
- Shivkumar Sharma (1938–2022), Indian musician
- Shivkumar Shukla (1918–1998), Indian vocalist
