= Wasiti =

Wāsiṭī (Arabic: واسطي, also anglicized as Wasity or Wasti) is a toponymic surname originating from the city of Wasit, Iraq. Twelver Shias in India and Pakistan descending from Zayd ibn Ali also carry the surname along with Zaidi (see Zaidi Wasitis). Notable people bearing the name include:

- Abu Bakr Muhammad ibn Ahmad al-Wasiti, 11th-century Arab writer
- Yahya ibn Mahmud al-Wasiti, 13th-century Arab painter and calligrapher
- Hamza El Wasti, Moroccan professional footballer
- Rizwan Wasti (1937–2011), Pakistani radio broadcaster
- Tahira Wasti (1944–2012), Pakistani writer
- Nasir Wasti (1967–2006), Pakistani cricketer
- Wajahatullah Wasti (born 1974), Pakistani cricketer
- Laila Wasti (born 1977), Pakistani actress
- Maria Wasti (born 1980), Pakistani actress

== See also ==
- Vashti (disambiguation)
- Wasit (disambiguation)
- Zaidi (disambiguation)
