= Nishi (actress) =

Indian actress (born 1935)

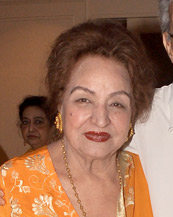
- Nishi in 2015
- Born: Krishna Kumari Sharma; 1 January 1935 (age 91); Sialkot, then in Punjab, British India
- Occupation: Actress
- Years active: 1955 – 1970
- Known for: Railway Platform; Pind di kudi Bhangra (1959)
- Spouse: Rajkumar Kohli
- Children: Armaan Kohli, Gogi Kohli

Nishi Kohli (born Krishna Kumari Sharma, 1 January 1935), known professionally as Nishi, is an Indian former actress who has worked in Punjabi and Hindi-language films.

She frequently acted with Dara Singh.

== Early life and career ==
Krishna Kumari Sharma, professional career name 'Nishi', was born on 1 January 1935 in Sialkot, Punjab, British India. Although Nishi was a Punjabi film star, she also worked in Hindi films where she was often cast in secondary roles. She worked in A-list films in Punjab that earned national film awards. Her most prominent Punjabi films are Main Jatti Punjab Di, alongside co-star, Prem Nath and Satluj De Kandhe, alongside co-star Balraj Sahni.

Nishi was an actress during the black-and-white era of Punjabi cinema, but later received opportunities to act in color films of Hindi cinema, where she acted with stars including Dara Singh, Raj Kapoor, Balraj Sahni, Bharat Bhushan, Helen, Ashok Kumar, Shashi Kapoor, Madhubala, Mala Sinha, and Rajendra Kumar. While she was cast as a leading actress in Punjabi films, she took supporting roles in Bollywood films with heroines such as Mala Sinha, Madhubala and Vyjayanthimala. Nishi's notable Bollywood films include Main Nashe Mein Hoon, Ganwaar, Phagun, Boyfriend, Naya Kanoon and Railway Platform (1955 film).

In total, Nishi acted in 68 Hindi films.

== Personal life ==
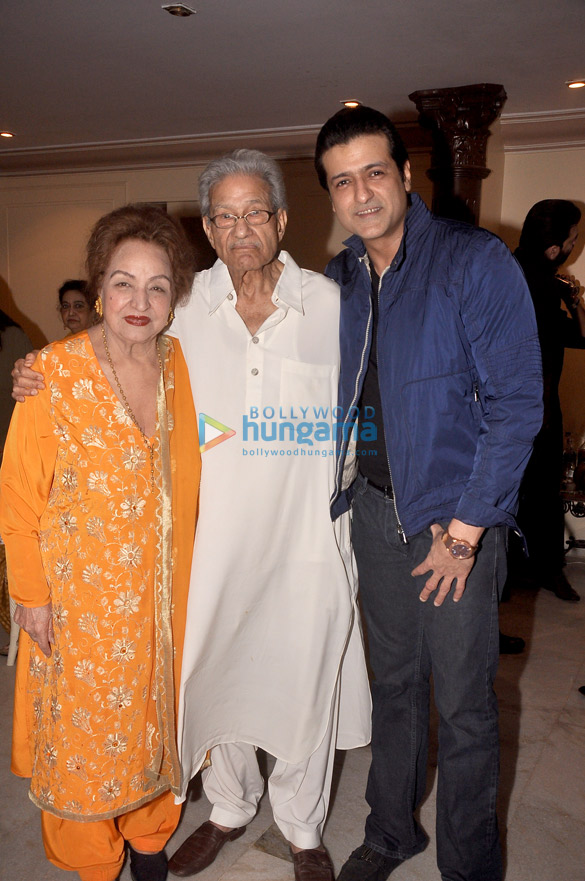
Kohli with her husband Rajkumar Kohli and son Armaan in 2015

Nishi married producer Raj Kumar Kohli, who made "snake-woman" thrillers such as Nagin and Jaani Dushman. They have two sons, actor Armaan Kohli and Gogi Kohli. Armaan acted in his father's films Badle Ki Aag and Raaj Tilak as a child actor. The actor then went on to appear in TV shows such as Big Boss.

== Filmography ==
=== Punjabi ===
Year	Title	Role	Notes
1959	Bhangra		Debut Punjabi Film
1961	Jija Ji		
1961	Billo		
1961	Guddi		
1961	Guguddiddi		
1962	Dhol Jaani		
1962	Banto		
1963	Pind Di Kurhi		
1963	Sapni		
1963	Laajo		
1963	Lado Rani		
1964	Main Jatti Punjab Di		
1964	Satluj De Kandhe		
1965	Dharti Veeran Di		
1966	Laiye Tod Nibhaiye	Jatto	
1966	Dulla Bhatti		
1969	Nanak Nam Jahaz Hai		

=== Hindi ===
Year	Title	Role	Notes
1955	Railway Platform	Mrs. Kapoor	Debut Film
1955	Char Paise	Roop	
1955	Son Of Alibaba		
1956	26 January		
1956	Ghulam Beghum Badshah		
1956	Kismet		
1957	Mr. X		
1957	Mera Salaam		
1957	Miss India		
1957	Neelofar		
1957	Miss Bombay		
1957	Samundar		
1958	Night Club		
1958	Phagun	Rajkumaari	
1958	Miss Punjab Mail		
1958	Chaubees Ghante		
1958	Chaalbaaz		
1958	Milan		
1958	Baghi Sipahi	Emperor's wife	
1958	Son Of Sinbad		
1959	Main Nashe Mein Hoon	Rita Bakshi	
1959	Bhai Bahen		
1959	Kangan		
1959	Kya Yeh Bombai Hai		
1959	Insan Jaag Utha	Hansa / Riny	
1959	Sawan		
1959	Forty Days		
1959	Flying Rani		
1960	Delhi Junction		
1960	Miss Goodnight		
1960	Tu Nahin Aur Sahi	Bimla	
1960	Parakh		
1961	Dark Street		
1961	Pyaar Ki Pyaas		
1961	Boy Friend	Sushma	
1961	Black Shadow		
1962	Dilli Ka Dada		
1962	Pick Pocket		
1962	Vallah Kya Bhaat Hai		
1962	Raj Nandini		
1963	Bin Badal Barsaat		
1963	Ek Tha Alibaba		
1963	Gul-E-Bakavali		
1963	Pyaar Ka Bandhan		
1964	Hercules		
1964	Aaya Toofan		
1964	Sarfarosh		
1964	Main Suhagan Hoon		
1964	Ek Din Ka Badshah		
1964	Darasingh: Ironman	Madhumati H. Singh	
1964	Badshah	Sheeba/Tingu	
1965	Naya Kanoon		
1965	Lootera	Shabana	
1966	Shera Daku		
1966	Sher Afghan		
1966	Khoon Ka Khoon		
1966	Husn Ka Ghulam		
1967	Sardar		
1967	Naujavan		
1968	Lutera Aur Jadugar		
1968	Watan Se Dhoor		
1969	Thief Of Baghdad		
1969	Danka		
1970	Ganwaar	Mrs. Rai	
1970	Moojrim		
1971	Sher-E-Watan		
1971	Daku Mansingh		
1984	Jeene Nahi Doonga		
