= Mama Ji =

1964 film

- Directed by: Roshan Bhardwaj
- Written by: Mulkhraj Bhakhri
- Screenplay by: Mulkhraj Bhakhri
- Story by: Mulkhraj Bhakhri
- Produced by: Gopal Saigal; S.P. Malhotra
- Starring: Gopal Saigal; Indira Billi; V. Gopal; Mehmood (actor); Moolchand; Khairati; Bela Bose; Madhumati; Mohan Choti; Suresh; Aruna; Baby Minash; Lalita Kumari
- Cinematography: Raj Kumar Bhakhri
- Edited by: Shyam
- Music by: S. Madan
- Production companies: Bombay Film Lab, Shree Sound Studios,
- Release date: 1964
- Running time: 135 minutes
- Country: India
- Language: Punjabi

Mama Ji (Punjabi: ਮਾਮਾ ਜੀ), also spelled incorrectly as Mamaji, is a 1964 Punjabi film directed by Roshan Bhardwaj, produced by Gopal Saigal and S. P. Malhotra, starring Gopal Saigal, and Indira Billi in lead roles.

== Synopsis ==
Mama Ji is a drama with comedy and romance. Bansi Lal is an idle and not very intelligent man living in his (married) sister's home. His maternal grandfather is a businessman in Africa. His sister, Lajwanti, and her husband, Kirpa Ram, are very unhappy with him as he does not use his brain at work. They want him to leave. One day, he buys a magic stick from a magician thinking that the stick really has magic. This makes his sister and her husband very angry again. As he realized that the stick does not actually have any magic, he feels robbed and one day, he snatches money from the magician and runs and hides himself in a Tonga. A beautiful girl, Laali, is searching for his father, lost in the Visakhi mela (English: fair). A Tonga driver takes her with him, in the same Tonga in which Bansi is hiding, saying that he will find her father. After they leave the city, the driver tries to rape her, but Bansi rescues her and takes her home. The police locate Laali as her father reported and come to Kirpa Ram's home to get her back. Laali's father takes her back with thanks, but Kirpa Ram gets angry as the police came to his home because of Bansi and throws him out. Wandering, Bansi reaches Laali's village where he saves her from Phumman, a proud son of Khema - a patwari (English: local land record officer). Bansi stays at Laali's home.

A lawyer comes to Kirpa Ram saying that Bansi's grandfather has died giving his property to Bansi. At this, as Bansi is now a rich man, and they start to search for him.

As the village is in trouble because of a lion, the patwari demands some guns from his senior officers and distributes them to the young men to kill the lion, which has killed many people of the village. Laali's father takes Bansi to be a brave man, and gives him a gun. Bansi, afraid but determined not to let anyone know about his fear, goes to jungle with the gun. Incidentally, a bullet from Bansi's gun kills the lion. Bansi is honored for his bravery and his photo is published in the newspaper, which helps his sister and Kirpa Ram to locate him.

Bansi, to manage his property, leaves Laali's village, promising her that he will come back. Laali asks Bansi to write letters on a shopkeeper's address. One day Bansi receives a letter from Laali; as Bansi is illiterate, his servant arranges a literate person, Saukha Ram, to read the letter and writes a reply. But the letter does not reach Laali as Phumman, bribing the shopkeeper, takes the letter. Every letter written by Bansi is taken by Phumman. Saukha Ram, a partner of Chameli - a dancer, plans to rob Bansi. To do this he decides to read Laali's letters wrong, in order to kick Laali out from Bansi's heart and make him like Chameli. Saukha Ram reads the letter wrong, which makes Bansi angry and he writes words of hatred in his reply. Laali, this time reaching in time, takes the letter from Phumman but her heart is broken on reading such a hateful reply from Bansi. But on knowing that Bansi is in a bad company, she reaches Bansi's home disguised as an officer, and frights him to take his money back to his grandfather's account in Africa. Saukha Ram fixes bribe with the officer and tells him that he kicked his beloved Laali out of his heart as part of the plan to rob Bansi. Then Saukha Ram suggests that Bansi sell all his property and at night, tries to steal Bansi's cash. But Laali, disguised as the officer, frightens him and takes all the cash from him. Bansi becomes poor again and all his good time friends back off. Disappointed, Bansi tries to commit suicide but Laali saves him, telling him that she still loves him, and takes him home. Finally, Bansi is told that he is not poor, his cash is safe, and they get happily married.

== Cast ==
Actor/Actress	Role
Gopal Saigal	Bansi
Indira Billi	Laali
Khairati	Saukha Ram
Lalita Kumari	Laj wanti
V. Gopal	Kirpa Ram
Bela Bose	Chameli
Satish Chhabra	Lali's father

== Music ==
Movies music related was on His Master's Voice and composed by S. Madan for playback singers Mohammad Rafi, Shamshad Begum, Mahinder Kapoor, Usha Mangeshkar, Suman Kalyanpur, S. Balbir and Minu Purshottam. Verma Malik and Naqsh Lyallpuri penned the lyrics. A song, teri do takiaan di naukri, ve mera lakhaan da saawan jaanda, became very popular.

Tracklist

- Na Main Koi Wali Aulia (by Mohd. Rafi & S. Balbir)
- Chhak-Chhak Gaddi Chaldi Jandi Sung by Mohammad Rafi)
- Teri Do Takian Di Naukri
- Tainu Dasni Haan Ik Gall Sajjna Sung by Suman Kalyanpur
- Dhuppan Vi Udas Ney
