= Hansraj Behl =

Indian music composer

- Born: 19 November 1916; Sheikhupura, Punjab, British India
- Died: 20 May 1984 (aged 67)
- Occupation: Film score composer
- Years active: 1946 – 1984
- Children: Chander H. Bahl

Hansraj Behl (19 November 1916 – 20 May 1984) was an Indian music composer, who composed music both for Hindi and Punjabi films. Hansraj is now widely considered to be a well-respected composer who created his own trends.

== Early life and education ==
Born on 19 November 1916 in Sheikhupura, Punjab, British India (now in Punjab, Pakistan), Hansraj received his early education in music from Pandit Acharay Chiranjivilal 'Jigyasu'. His father was a zamindar (landlord) in his area.

== Career ==
Hansraj Behl opened a music school in Anarkali Bazaar, Lahore, Punjab, British India and released a few non-film records through His Master's Voice. Hansraj, along with his younger brother Gulshan Behl and poet and film songs lyricist Verma Malik, travelled to Bombay in 1944 to pursue a career as a music director in Hindi film industry. His uncle Chunnilal Behl introduced him to the famous actor Prithviraj Kapoor. He managed to make his debut as a composer with film Pujari (1946), directed by Ardeshir Irani. He introduced the noted playback singer Asha Bhosle who made her Hindi film debut when she sang, along with Zohrabai Ambalewali, the song Saawan aaya for Hansraj Behl's film Chunariya (1948).

In 1964, he gave music for hit Punjabi film by Padam Prakash Maheshwary titled Satluj De Kandhe, starring Balraj Sahni, Nishi, Wasti, and Mirza Musharraf. The patriotic hit, "Jahan Daal Daal Pe Sone Ki Chidiya Karti Hai Basera.." sung by Mohammed Rafi in the film Sikandar-e-Aazam (1965), starring Prithviraj Kapoor was one of his last memorable number. Hansraj Behl and Master Ghulam Haider are widely considered to be two well-respected music directors of Indian Film Industry even among the musicians.

== Death ==
He worked with film song lyricists like Pandit Indra Chandra, D. N. Madhok, Prem Dhawan, Verma Malik, Asad Bhopali, Qamar Jalalabadi and Naqsh Lyallpuri during his four-decade-long career and scored music for nearly 67 films.

Hansraj Behl died of liver cancer on 20 May 1984.

== Filmography ==
- Pujari (1946) (Film producer Ardeshir Irani gave him his first break into the Indian film industry at the recommendation of Prithviraj Kapoor)
- Phoolwari (1946)
- Chheen Le Azadi (1947)
- Gunsundari (1948) (Hindi/Gujarati film)
- Karwat (1949)
- Lachhi (1949)(Punjabi-language movie, it was a big hit in India)
- Chhai (1950) Punjabi Movie
- Shaan (1950)
- Chunariya (1948) (Hansraj Behl introduced Asha Bhosle in this film)
- Chakori (1949)
- Karwat (1949) for B. R. Chopra
- Khiladi (1950)
- Khamosh Sipahi (1950)
- Phoolon Ke Haar (1951) (Hansraj Behl introduced singer Mubarak Begum in this film)
- Nakhre (1951)
- Miss Bombay (1957)
- Rajput (1951)
- Moti Mahal (1952)
- Jaggu (1952) (Hansraj Behl gave Verma Malik and Naqsh Lyallpuri their first break in this film)
- Apni Izzat (1952) (Hansraj Behl introduced singer Madhubala Zaveri in this film)
- Lal Pari (1954)
- Dost (1954)
- Mast Qalandar (1955)
- Rajdhani (1956)
- Changez Khan (1957)
- Milan (1958)
- Bhangra (film) (1959) - Punjabi
- Sawan (1959)
- Do Lachhian (1959) Punjabi Movie
- Mud Mud Ke Na Dekh (1960)
- Pind Di Kurhi (1963) (Punjabi film)
- Satluj De Kandhe (1964) - Punjabi film
- Sikandar E Azam (1965)
- Rustom-E-Hind (1965)
- Do Aankhen (1974)
- Morni (1975) Punjabi Movie
- Sher Puttar (1977) Punjabi Movie
- Jai Mata Di (1977) Punjabi Movie
- Jatt Punjabi (1979) - Punjabi Movie
- Kunwara Mama (1979) - Punjabi Movie
- Jatti (1980) - Punjabi Movie
- Chaska (1981) - Punjabi Movie
- Jatt Da Gandasa (1991) - Punjabi Movie
- Jeeja Sali (1985)- Punjabi Movie
- Insaaf Ka Khoon (1991)
