= Posti (1950 film) =

1950 film

- Directed by: K. D. Mehra
- Produced by: Kwatra Art Productions
- Starring: Majnu; Shyama; Bhag Singh; Ramesh Thakur
- Music by: Sardul Singh Kwatra
- Release date: 8 June 1950
- Country: India
- Language: Punjabi

Posti is a 1950 Indian Punjabi-language film and the first production of Kwatra Art Productions (of Sardul Singh Kwatra's brother Harcharan Singh Kwatra), who was the cinematogrpaher in Punjabi movie Mangti (1942 film).

This film was directed by Krishan Dev Mehra, starring Majnu and Shyama in the lead roles. Shyama was the principal female actress of this movie. It did well at the box office in the Punjab and Delhi areas. Noted playback singer Asha Bhosle made her film playback singing debut with this film.

== Cast ==
- Shyama as Peengh
- Majnu as a Posti Shah
- Manorama as Patola
- Chand Burke as Bhag Bhari
- Randhir as Ganga Ram
- Bhag Singh as Tangewala
- Ramesh Thakur as Gaana Shah, Posti Shah's father
- Davendar
- Pandit Ji
- Rajni Begam
- K. Ranjit
- Rani Shakuntla
- Moti Sood as Ustad
- Amarnath as Pran Nath

== Music ==
The music, composed by Sardul Singh Kwatra.

Sardul modified the folk tunes of Punjab and the film songs became popular hits. Asha Bhosle, Mohammad Rafi, Shamshad Begum, Rajkumari and Jagjit Kaur were the playback singers. Rajkumari's first sang was for a Punjabi Kurhmai in 1941, but in the film Posti, her songs became big hits.

Popular songs of the film include Do Guttan Kar Merian by Asha Bhosle, Kajjle Di Paanian Dhaar by Rajkumari and a duet, Ja Phairha Posti by Mohammed Rafi and Shamshad Begum.
