= Shyama (Hindi actress) =

Indian film actress (1935–2017)

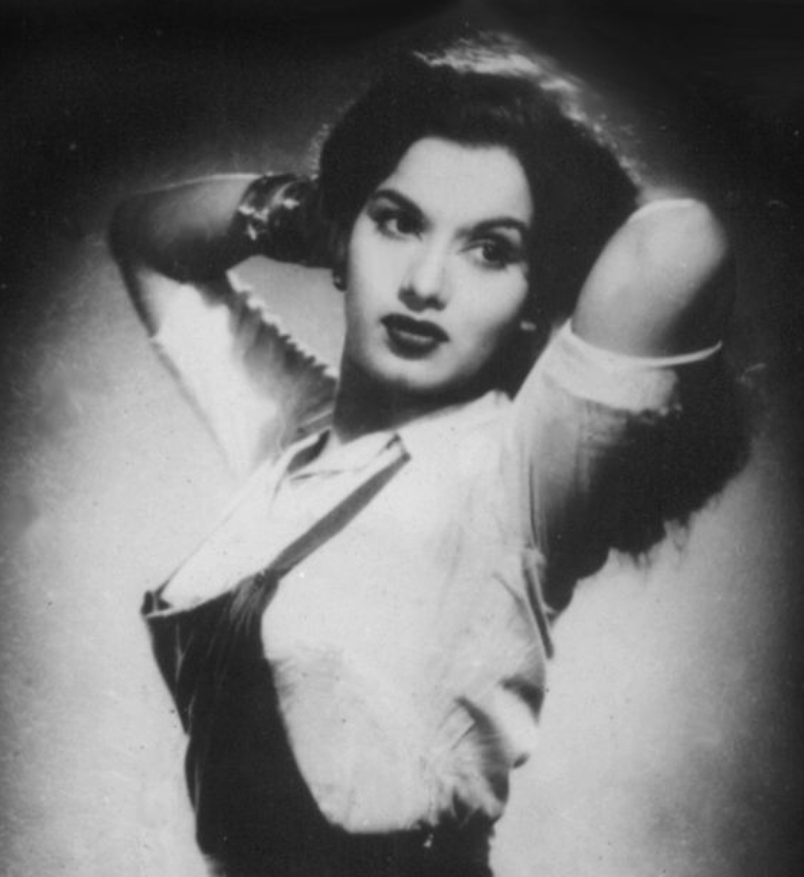
- Shyama in Aar Paar (1954)
- Born: Khursheed Akhtar; 12 June 1935; Lahore, Punjab, British India (now in Pakistan)
- Died: 14 November 2017 (aged 82); Mumbai, Maharashtra, India
- Resting place: Badakabarastan, Mumbai, India
- Occupation: Actress
- Years active: 1945 – 1989
- Notable work: Tarana (1951); Aar Paar (1954); Sharada (1957); Bārsāt Ki Rāt (1960)
- Spouse: Fali Mistry (m. 1954; died 1979)
- Children: Faroukh (son); Rohinton (son); Shirin (daughter)
- Awards: Filmfare Award for Best Supporting Actress (1958)

Shyama (born Khursheed Akhtar; 12 June 1935 – 14 November 2017) was an Indian actress who appeared in Hindi and Punjabi films. She first appeared as a child artist in the 1945 Hindi film Zeenat as Baby Khursheed. She later adopted the screen name Shyama, given to her by film director Vijay Bhatt. After years of playing small parts and side roles in films like Shabnam (1949) and Tarana (1951), her breakthrough in a starring adult role came with Aar Paar (1954). She also had some success in Punjabi films like Posti (1950) and Kaude Shah (1953).

Known for her versatility in various genres, Shyama went on to become a recognized star in both Hindi and Punjabi cinema in the 1950s and early 1960s. Some of her best known roles were in Sharada (1957), Bhabhi (1957), Bārsāt Ki Rāt (1960) and Zabak (1961). She later transitioned to taking on character roles in films like Milan (1967), Sawan Bhadon (1970) and her last film Hathyar (1989), after which she retired from acting.

== Early life ==
According to Shyama's interview as taken by film historian Shishir Krishna Sharma of the Beete Hue Din blog, Shyama was born as Khursheed Akhtar in Lahore, Punjab in British India on 12 June 1935. Her father was a fruit trader. When she was 2 years old, her father, due to his business, shifted the entire family from Lahore to Bombay (now Mumbai). Amongst the 9 children, Shyama was the youngest born. During one of her meetings with Shishir Krishna Sharma, Shyama stated that although films had an attraction for her, the social norms of those times discouraged her of even thinking about making a career in films. Despite that, it was a coincidence that she ventured in this field which caused some resistance at home, especially from her father's side but that did not last very long.

== Career ==
One fine day, Shyama, then a young girl, along with her friends, went to see the shooting of the film Zeenat (1945) starring Noor Jehan and being produced-directed by her then husband Shaukat Hussain Rizvi under the banner of Eastern Pictures. According to Shyama, Rizvi asked her and her friends, present there on the set, if they would like to work in the film to which Shyama and her friends readily agreed. Thus, Zeenat (1945) turned out to be the first film Shyama worked in, thereby making her film debut. She was 9 years old when she worked in the film and 10 when the film released in 1945. She was seen with Noor Jehan in the film's qawaali "Aahein Na Bhare Shikhwe Na Kiye" which was sung by Noor Jehan herself, Zohra Bai Ambalewali and Kalyani Bai with music by Hafeez Khan and lyrics by Nakhshab Jarchavi. Interestingly, Shashikala, then 11 years when shot and 12 when released, also appeared in the qawaali which became very popular during that period.

In a few of her initial films viz. Ghoonghat and Nai Maa (both 1946), she worked under the names Khursheed (Junior) and Baby Khursheed. But she had to change her name to Baby Shyama as a major star actress by that name Khursheed Bano was already present in the film industry. Shyama eventually ventured into adult roles and for the next 6 years, she appeared in small roles across several films such as Beete Din, Meerabai, Mehndi, Parwana (all 1947), Ram Baan (1948), Anmol Moti, Begunah, Char Din, Dillagi, Jal Tarang, Jeet, Kaneez, Naach, Namoona, Patanga, Sawan Bhadon, Shabnam, Shair (all 1949), Aahuti, Chhoti Bhabhi, Nili, Sartaj, Wafa (all 1950), Sazaa, Tarana (both 1951) and so on. In 1949, she came in contact with film producer Harcharan Singh Kwatra and his younger brother music director Sardul Singh Kwatra, who liked her command over Punjabi language and cast in their film Posti, which went on to become a big commercial success in 1950, making her a popular actress in Punjabi cinema. Noted playback singer, Asha Bhosle, made her film playback singing debut with this film.

As a lead actress, she appeared for the first time in Shrimatiji followed by Aasmaan. In both these 1952 releases, she was paired opposite Nasir Khan. Her breakthrough role came with Guru Dutt's Aar Paar (1954), in which she played the vivacious daughter of a garage owner who falls for an ex-convict (Dutt). The success of this film made her a top actress. Eventually, Shyama rose to one of the topmost leading female stars of the 1950s. Her popularity and success rate can be identified from the fact that in between 1952 to 1960, she was seen in around 82 films. Besides leading roles, she also played second lead roles to supportive and even negative characters. She had a record of having appeared in 14 films in 1954 to 13 films in 1955.

She had got the opportunity to work with most of the popular leading actors of her time. Aar Paar (1954) with Guru Dutt, Ghamand (1955) with Raaj Kumar, Gul Sanobar & Thokar (both 1953) with Shammi Kapoor, Musafir Khana (1955) & Laadla (1954) with Karan Dewan, Bhai Bhai (1956) & Baap Bete (1959) with Ashok Kumar, Chandan (1958) & Lahren (1953) with Kishore Kumar, Maa (1952), Dhoop Chhaon (1954) & Teen Bhai (1955) with Bharat Bhushan, Khushboo & Savdhaan (both 1954) with Motilal Rajvansh, Tatar Ka Chor (1955) & Zabak (1961) with Mahipal, Lala Rookh (1958) with Talat Mahmood and Jaggu (1952) with Kamal Kapoor were some of her favourite films and other films like Chhoo Mantar (1956), Duniya Rang Rangeeli, Johnny Walker (both 1957), Khota Paisa, Mr. Qartoon M. A. (both 1958) with Johnny Walker were appreciated by her as well. All these were musical comedy films. Except Khota Paisa, music of all these films were composed by the music composer Omkar Prasad Nayyar. Shyama said, "It was very easy for us to dance to the tunes made by him."

As per Shyama, she never planned her film career; she essayed every kind of role that came her way. One of her most memorable performances came in the 1957 film Sharada, where she played the role of Chanchal, who finds that her husband, Raj Kapoor, and his stepmother, played by Meena Kumari, were in a relationship before marrying his father. The same year, she starred in Bhabhi (1957), where she played a scheming sister-in-law who plots to separate brothers. She worked with Shammi Kapoor again in the romantic classic Mirza Sahiban (1957), made by the Kwatra brothers.

Some of her other well-known Hindi films of the time include Chandan (1958), Lala Rukh (1958), Chhoti Bahen (1959), and Do Behnen (1959) in which she played the double role of twin sisters. She also acted as the second lead in P.L. Santoshi’s Bārsāt Ki Rāt (1960).

Her last Punjabi film was Vilayat Pass in 1961. Her role was critically acclaimed, though the film did not do too well. In later years, her memorable roles came in Hindi films such as Dil Diya Dard Liya (1966), Sawan Bhadon (1970) and Masterji (1985).

For the next 3 decades from 1961, she worked in almost 60 films like Duniya Jhukti Hai (1960), Bahurani, Gumrah (both 1953), Jee Chahta Hai (1964), Janwar (1965), Dil Diya Dard Liya (1966), Aag, Milan (both 1967), Balak (1969), Mastana, Sawan Bhadon (1970), Gomti Ke Kinare (1972), Prabhat (1973), Naya Din Nayi Raat (1974), Chaitali, Khel Khel Mein (both 1975), Ginny Aur Johny (1976), Khel Khilari Ka (1977), Haqdaar (1981), Mohabbat (1985), Mera Karam Mera Dharam (1987) and Pyase Nain (1989). She said, "My stamina was reducing with my increasing age. I would get tired very easily. Before people had a chance to say Shyama can't work anymore, I thought it better to retire. J. P. Dutta's Hathyar released in 1989 proved to be my last film."

== Awards and recognition ==
She was honored with the BFJA Award for Best Actress for her role in the 1956 film Chhoo Mantar. For her performance in the 1957 film Sharada, she was awarded the Filmfare Award for Best Supporting Actress.

== Personal life ==
During the shooting of Sazaa (1951) whic was being produced and directed by ace cinematographer Fali Mistry (17 February 1917 - 16 December 1979), Shyama and Fali Mistry became close and they married in 1954, he was 37 and she was 19 at the time of their marriage. Her husband was a Parsi (Zoroastrian) from Bombay, India. They kept the marriage secret for as many as 10 years because of the fear that Shyama's career would suffer if her marriage became known; in those days, it was thought that the fan following of female stars became less as soon as they married. She said, "I revealed this fact only when, after 10 years of marriage, I gave birth to my son Faroukh. Anyways during the start of the 1960s, I had completely become a character artist." The couple had three children, two sons, Faroukh and Rohin, and a daughter Shirin. Fali Mistry died in 1979, thereafter she continued to stay in Mumbai. Their marriage seemed to have worked out well and they got along well with each other. In a 2013 interview, she reportedly said, "My greatest weakness was always Fali."

Shyama's close friends were actress Ameeta and Johnny Walker. Nasir Kazi, Johnny Walker's son, expressed his grief on hearing the news of her death. In an interview with Mid-Day, he said, "It's really disheartening to know about the demise of Shyama aunty. She had done several films with my father and in a lot of them, she paired with him also. In fact, in the film that was made on his name Johnny Walker, she was the heroine with him. Her closest friends from the industry included Nadira, Nirupa Roy, Sitara Devi, Nimmi, Shakila and Shashikala and they used to meet regularly. She said, "It's been almost 40 years since Fali passed away, the kids are engrossed in their domestic lives and my friends have gone far away. Today I am all alone. But it's been my habit to adjust with changing times, that's why I even enjoy my loneliness."

Her son Faroukh Mistry is a cinematographer. Faroukh's previous film to hit the theatres was Angrezi Mein Kehte Hain in the year 2018.

== Death ==
Shyama died on 14 November 2017 due to a lung infection at the age of 82. She is buried at Badakabarastan, Marine Lines in Mumbai, India.

== Filmography ==
=== Hindi ===
Year	Film	Role	Notes
1945	Zeenat	Chorus qawaali singer	Debut film; Appeared in the chorus of the song "Aahein Na Bhare Shikhwe Na Kiye"
1946	Ghoonghat		
1946	Nai Maa		
1947	Beete Din		
1947	Meerabai		
1947	Mehndi		
1947	Parwana	Sakina	
1948	Jalsa		
1948	Rambaan		
1949	Anmol Moti		
1949	Begunaah		
1949	Char Din		
1949	Dillagi	Paro	
1949	Jal Tarang		
1949	Jeet		
1949	Kaneez	Suraiya	
1949	Naach		
1949	Namoona	Leila	Uncredited
1949	Naqli Baap		
1949	Patanga	Gardener's wife	
1949	Rooplekha		
1949	Sawan Bhadon		
1949	Shabnam		
1950	Aahuti		
1950	Chhoti Bhabhi	Durgi	
1950	Dolti Naiya		
1950	Nishana	Radha's friend	
1950	Pyar		
1950	Sabak		
1950	Sartaj		
1950	Wafa		
1951	Hum Log	Shefali	
1951	Sazaa	Kamini	Produced & directed by her husband Fali Mistry.
1951	Tarana	Sheila	
1952	Aasmaan		
1952	Baap Bete		
1952	Badnaam		
1952	Bhoole Bhatke		
1952	Jaggu		
1952	Maa	Meena	
1952	Nishan Danka		
1952	Shrimatiji	Indira	
1953	Bahadur		
1953	Char Chand		
1953	Dil-e-Nadaan	Asha	
1953	Gul Sanobar	Mehar Angez	
1953	Lahren		
1953	Shyama		
1953	Suhag Sindoor		
1953	Thokar		
1954	Aar Paar	Nikki	
1954	Darwaza		
1954	Dhoop Chhaon		
1954	Haar Jeet		
1954	Khushboo		
1954	Ladla	Neilu	
1954	Majboori		
1954	Pensioner		
1954	Pilpli Saheb		
1954	Pyase Nain		
1954	Saltanat		
1954	Savdhan		
1954	Shart	Kamini	
1954	Tulsidas		
1955	Bhagwat Mahima		
1955	Char Paise	Seema Bakshi	
1955	Do Dulhe	Parvati (Paro)	
1955	Ghamand		
1955	Ghar Ghar Me Diwali		
1955	Haha Hihi Hoo Hoo		
1955	Haseena		
1955	Khandaan		
1955	Mahima		
1955	Musafir Khana	Mala	
1955	Shahi Mehman		
1955	Tatar Ka Chor		
1955	Teen Bhai		
1955	Tis Mar Khan		
1956	Bhai-Bhai	Sangeeta B. Anand	
1956	Chhoo Mantar	Sanwali	
1956	Inqilab	Roohi	
1956	Makkhee Choos	Lakshmi	
1956	Sheikh Chilli	Nadira	
1957	Bandi	Kamala Pandey Mishra	
1957	Bhabhi	Tara	
1957	Duniya Rang Rangeeli	Nirmala	
1957	Hill Station		
1957	Jannat		
1957	Johnny Walker	Chandra	
1957	Mai Baap	Basanti	
1957	Mirza Sahiban	Sahiban	
1957	Sharada	Chanchal	Won Filmfare Best Supporting Actress Award
1957	Tajposhi		
1958	Chandan		
1958	Gopichand		
1958	Khazanchi	Usha	
1958	Khota Paisa	Roopa	
1958	Lala Rookh	Lala Rookh	
1958	Mr. Qartoon M. A.	Shyama	
1958	Panchayat	Susheila	
1958	Suvarna Sundari	Jayanti	She plays the female avatar Jayanti of the actual male character Jayant, essayed by Akkineni Nageswara Rao.
1958	Taqdeer		
1958	Teesri Gali		
1959	Baap Bete		
1959	Bus Conductor	Asha	
1959	Chhoti Bahen	Shobha	
1959	Do Behnen	Vasanti & Malti (twin sisters)	Double role
1959	Mr. John		
1960	Apna Ghar	Kamini Sinha	
1960	Bārsāt Ki Rāt	Shama	
1960	Duniya Jhukti Hai	Lakshmi	
1960	Kala Aadmi	Indira	
1960	Police Detective		
1960	Trunk Call		
1961	Sara Jahan Hamara		
1961	Zabak	Zainab	
1962	Issi Ka Naam Duniya Hai	Kamala	
1962	Raaz Ki Baat	Ranjana	
1963	Bahurani	Chanda	Special Appearance
1963	Commercial Pilot Officer		
1963	Ghar Basake Dekho	Mona Mehra	
1963	Gumrah	Deepa	
1963	Jab Se Tumhe Dekha Hai	Qawaali singer	Special Appearance
1964	Ji Chahta Hai		
1965	Janwar	Seema Shrivastav	
1966	Dil Diya Dard Liya	Mala	
1966	Lal Bangla	Bela	
1967	Aag	Dancer	
1967	Mehrban	Mangala Swaroop	
1967	Mera Bhai Mera Dushman	Sarita	
1967	Milan	Gauri's step-mother	
1967	Milan Ki Raat	Govind's wife	
1968	Ek Raat	Bela	
1969	Balak	Tara Das	
1969	Beti	Kamala Verma	
1970	Mastana	Dhanraj's wife	
1970	Sawan Bhadon	Sulochana	
1971	Kangan	Champakali	
1972	Gomti Ke Kinare	Shyama Das	
1972	Rut Rangeeli Ayee	Brijbala	
1972	Shaadi Ke Baad	Basanti's mother	
1972	Zindagi Zindagi	Meeta Sharma's aunt	
1973	Honeymoon	Lakshmi Chaudhary	
1973	Khoon Khoon		
1973	Prabhat	Champa Bai	
1973	Suraj Aur Chanda	Kalavati	
1974	Madhosh	Padma Bai	
1974	Naya Din Nai Raat	Procuress	
1975	Apne Rang Hazaar	Padma	
1975	Chaitali	Chaitali's step-mother	
1975	Sewak	Shobha	
1977	Khel Khilari Ka	Mrs. Khairatilal	
1985	Masterji	Shanti	
1987	Mera Karam Mera Dharam	Neila's mother	
1988	Chintamani Surdas		
1989	Pyase Nain	Raj Kumar's mother	
1989	Hathyar	Suman's grandmother	Final role & film

=== Punjabi ===
Year	Film	Role	Notes
1950	Posti	Peengh	Debut role & film
1953	Koday Shah	Billo	
1953	Lara Lappa	Jugni	
1961	Walait Pass	Shyamo	Final role & film
