= Kaude Shah =

1953 film

- Directed by: S. P. Bakshi
- Story by: Sarla Bakshi
- Produced by: Mrs. Malika Kwatra; N. S. Kwatra and Harcharan Singh Kwatra
- Starring: Daljit; Shyama; Miss Manju; Chand Burqe; Th. Ramesh Nagpal; Rajni; Jaswant; Mohan and Kharaiti
- Music by: Sardul Singh Kwatra
- Release date: 3 July 1953
- Country: India
- Language: Punjabi

Kaude Shah (also spelled as Koday Shah or Kode Shah) is a 1953 Indian Punjabi-language film directed by S.P. Bakshi (Shanti Prakash Bakshi).

== Cast ==
The film stars include Daljit, Shyama, Miss Manju, Thakur Ramesh Nagpal, Chand Burqe, Rajni, Jaswant, Kharaiti and Mohan.

== Music and film songs ==
Sardul Kwatra composed the music and playback singers were Shamshad Begum, Talat Mahmood and Rajkumari. The songs of the film were written by Verma Malik and became very popular.

(1) Jatta aayi basakhi, faslan di mukk gayi raakhi – (Chorus) by Talat Mahmood, Shaminder, Meena Mangeshkar

(2) Tunka tunka maar meri patli patang, Eidha peela peela rang – Shamshad Begum and others

(3) Ajj sohne kapde te chunni vi bareek ae – (Chorus) by Shamshad Begum

(4) Wey mein gal wich pake palla – Shamshad Begum

(5) Zulfan nein khul gaiyyaan – Talat Mahmood, Rajkumari

(6) Chhan chhan kardi gali wichhon langdi, Mere sajna di daachi badami rang di – Shamshad Begum

(7) Chhad de tu mera dupatta, Sunn wey majhay diya jatta – Shamshad Begum

(8) Kachchi kali si nazuk dil mera, Koi sun ke aime marore gaya – Shamshad Begum

(9) Haaye o meri majboori – Chorus by Verma Malik and others

(10) Likhya naseeb mera – Rajkumari
