= Bhangra (film) =

1959 film

- ਭੰਗੜਾ
- Directed by: Jugal Kishore
- Story by: Mulk Raj Bhakhri
- Produced by: Mulk Raj Bhakhri
- Starring: Sunder as Sunder; Nishi as Banto; Majnu; Gopal Saigal as Ruldu Ram; Kharaiti as munshi mehnga mall; Vimla Kumari; Ramlal as Bulaki (Banto‘s father)
- Cinematography: Raj Kumar Bhakhri
- Edited by: Lachhman Dass
- Music by: Hansraj Behl
- Production companies: Mohan Studios; Prakash Studios
- Release date: 1959
- Running time: 120 minutes
- Country: India
- Language: Punjabi

Bhangra (Punjabi: ਭੰਗੜਾ) is a 1959 Punjabi romance, comedy and drama film directed by Jugal Kishore, starring Sunder, Nishi and Majnu in lead roles.

== Synopsis ==
Sunder, the son of moneylender Kaude Shah, goes to a poor farmer, Bulaki, in the village of Rangpur to get money owed, but falls in love with his daughter Banto. A suspended Munshi (Cashier/Assistant of a money-lender) of Kaude Shah, Mehnga Mall, also tries to get Banto; he steals Kaude Shah's jewellery and reaches Rangpur. He gives the jewellery to Sunder for staying away from him and Banto. Sunder gives the jewellery to Bulaki to pay back his debt and so did the unconscious Bulaki. The truth comes out and Bulaki is charged for stealing jewellery. He explains that the jewellery was given to him by Sunder and so Sunder is arrested. Finally, Mehnga Mall confesses and Bulaki and Sunder go free. After a little protest Sunder's father, Kaude Shah, agrees to Sunder and Banto's marriage.

== Music ==
Noted music director Hansraj Behl composed the music and Verma Malik wrote the lyrics for the film. Mohammad Rafi and Shamshad Begum are the lead playback singers. The music and film songs were big hits.

=== Track list ===
- "Rabb Na Kare", Shamshad Begum, Mohammad Rafi
- Batti Bal Ke Banere Utte Rakhdi Haun, Shamshad Begum
- Chitte Dand Hasno Nahio Rehnde, Mohammad Rafi
- Jatt Kurhian Ton Darda Maara, Modhay Uttay Daang Rakhda (Bolian), Mohammad Rafi, Shamshad Begum & others
- Ambiaan De Booteaan Te Lagg Gaya Boor Ni, Shamshad Begum
- Been Na Wajaeen Mundia, Shamshad Begum
- Mull Wikda Sajjan Mil Jaavey, Shamshad Begum
- Chhetti Doli Tore Babula, Shamshad Begum and chorus
