= List of Hindi films of 1944 =

A list of films produced by the Hindi language film industry based in Mumbai in 1944:

== Highest-grossing films ==
The seven highest-grossing films at the Indian box office in 1944:

Rank	Title	Nett collection
1	Rattan	₹1 crore
2	Dost	₹55 lakh
3	Bhanwara	₹45 lakh
4	Meri Bahen	₹40 lakh
5	Bharthari	₹38 lakh
6	Mumtaz Mahal	₹35 lakh
7	Chal Chal Re Naujawan	₹30 lakh

== A-C ==
Title	Director	Cast	Genre	Notes
Aaina	S. M. Yusuf	Trilok Kapoor, Sulochana Chatterjee, Yakub, Gope, Kaushalya, Yashodhra Katju, Husn Banu, Mirza Musharraf, Leela Mishra	Social	Music: Fateh Ali Khan, Gulshan Sufi; Lyrics: Pandit Phani, Tanveer Naqvi
Anban	Niren Lahiri	Nargis, Pahari Sanyal, Shah Nawaz, Shobhana Samarth, Gajanan Jagirdar, Mubarak	Social Drama	Music: Gyan Dutt; Lyrics: Pandit Madhur
Bade Nawab Saheb	B. D. Vedi	Chandra Mohan, Pramila, Pahari Sanyal, Bibbo, Kumar, Leela Mishra, Sushil Kumar, Shanta Patel, Ghory	Social	Music: Bashir Dehlvi; Lyrics: Shams Lakhnavi
Badi Baat	Mazhar Khan	Swarnalata, Mazhar Khan, Ulhas, Yakub, Zarina, Kumar, Gulab, Madhusudan	Social	Music: Firoz Nizami; Lyrics: Swami Ramanand Saraswati, Roopbani, Saraswati Kumar Deepak
Badmash	A. Karim	Anil Kumar, Shantarin, Benjamin, Leela Pawar, Sadiq, Jehangir	Action	Music: Khan Mastana; Lyrics: A. Karim
Bahadur	Bhagwan	Bhagwan, Shanta Patel, Baburao Pendharkar, Surekha, Samson, Bibijan, Gharpure	Action	Music: C. Ramchandra; Lyrics: Ehsan Rizvi
Bahar	M. Sadiq	Mehtab, Wasti, Nirmala Devi, Badri Prasad	Social	Music: Naushad; Lyrics:
Bandukwali	K. Amarnath	S. Nazir, Romila, Anil Kumar, Rekha Pawar, Prakash, Mehar Banu	Action	Music: Ram Gopal Pandey; Lyrics: Ehsan Rizvi
Beda Paar	Tara Harish	Sulochana Chatterjee, Dalpat, Bibìjan, Baburao Pehalwan, Nazira, Fazlu, M. Sandow	Action	Music: Vasant Kumar Naidu; Lyrics: Shams Lakhnavi
Bhagya Laxmi	Sarvottam Badami	Shanta Apte, Prem Adib, Vasanti, Jagdish Sethi, Agha, Rajkumari Shukla, Moni Chatterjee	Family Drama	Music: G. M. Durrani; Lyrics:
Bhai	Krishna Dev Mehra	Zahur Raja, Asha, Satish, Radharani, Manorama, Sabir	Family Drama	Music: Ghulam Haider; Lyrics: Shatir Ghaznavi
Bhanvara	Kidar Sharma	K. L. Saigal, Monica Desai, Yakub, Kamla Chatterjee, Arun Kumar, Kesari, Brijmala	Romance Comedy	Music: Khemchand Prakash; Lyrics: Kidar Sharma, Swami Ramanand Saraswati, Pandit Indra
Bhartrahari	Chaturbhuj Doshi	Mumtaz Shanti, Surendra, Sulochana Chatterjee, Arun Kumar, Yashwant Dave, Jehanara Kajjan, Nagendra	Fantasy Devotional	Music: Khemchand Prakash; Lyrics: Pandit Indra
Caravan	Aspi Irani	Arun Kumar, Kamla Chatterjee, Kesari, Sylvie St. Clair, Premlata	Action	Music: Bulo C. Rani; Lyrics: Swami Ramanand Saraswati, Pandit Indra, Munshi Aziz, Sharma
Chal Chal Re Naujawan	Gyan Mukherjee	Ashok Kumar, Naseem Banu, Rafiq Ghaznvi, V. H. Desai, Jagdish Sethi, Motibai, Navin Yagnik	Social	Music: Ghulam Haider; Lyrics: Kavi Pradeep
Chand	D.D. Kashyap	Sitara Devi, Prem Adib, Begum Para, Sapru, Shashikala, Balakram, Guru Dutt, Ram Singh	Social	Music: Lyrics:
Char Aankhen	Sushil Majumdar	Leela Chitnis, P. Jairaj, P. F. Peethawala, Ashalata, Paul Mahendra, Nand Kishore	Social	Music: Anil Biswas; Lyrics: Narendra Sharma

== D-K ==
Title	Director	Cast	Genre	Notes
Daasi	Hiren Bose	Najam,Ragini, Khairati, Kalavati, Om Prakash, Gyani, Pran	Social	Najmul Hassan with Ragini were the top film heroines from Lahore in the 1940s. Some scenes shot in the movie Punjab Assembly building and Mall Road Lahore, Music: Pandit Amarnath; Lyrics: D. N. Madhok song sang by Shamshad Begum, S. D. Batish, Zeenat Begum
Dil Ki Baat	Pralhad Keshav Atre	Ishwarlal, Vanmala, Durga Khote, Leela Mishra, Dixit, Baburao, Sheela, Mirajkar	Romantic Drama	Music: C. Ramchandra; Lyrics: Rammurti Chaturvedi
Do or Die a.k.a. Zindagi Ya Maut	Harbans Singh	Sheela, Baburao, Mirajkar, Samson	Action	Music: Mushtaq Hussain, Kelkar; Lyrics: Ehsan Rizvi
Dost	Shaukat Hussain Rizvi	Motilal, Noor Jehan, Maya Banerjee, Himalayawala, Husn Banu, Vatsala Kumtekar, Kanhaiyalal, Agha, Mirza Musharraf	Social Drama	Music: Sajjad Hussain; Lyrics: Shams Lakhnavi
Dr. Kumar	Kishore Sharma	Paresh Bannerjee, Latika, Sankatha Prasad, Rajkumari Shukla, Khurshid Jr, Nazma	Drama	Music: Saraswati Devi; Lyrics: Gafil Harnalvi
Draupadi	Baburao Patel	Sushila Rani Patel, Chandra Mohan, Mazhar Khan, David, Badri Prasad, Dixit, K. N. Singh, Leela Mishra	Fantasy	Music: Hanuman Prasad; Lyrics: Pandit Indra
Gaali	R. S. Choudhury	Karan Dewan, Nirmala Devi, Yakub, Manju Dewan, Sunalini Devi, Kanhaiyalal, Jilloo, Kamta Prasad, Mehndi Raza	Social Drama	Music: Hanuman Prasad, Sajjad Hussain; Lyrics: Rammurti Chaturvedi
Geet a.k.a. The Song	S. U. Sunny	Shahu Modak, Nirmala Devi, Amir Ali, Shakir, Chandabai, Zahid Ali	Social	Music: Naushad; Lyrics: D. N. Madhok
Ghar Ki Shobha	Harshadrai Sakerlal Mehta Ramesh Saigal	Karan Dewan, Swarnalata, Yashodhra Katju, Dixit, Jagdish Sethi, Fazlu	Family Drama	Music: Allah Rakha; Lyrics: Roopbani
Insaan	Babubhai Jani	Kishore Sahu, Shobhana Samarth, Pahari Sanyal, David, Maya Banerjee, Krishna Chandra Dey, Nand Kishore	Social	Music: Gyan Dutt; Lyrics: Pandit Indra
Irada	M. Shamsuddin	Dhiraj Bhattacharya, Patience Cooper, Shaida Keoravi, Purnima, Shyam Laha, Pushpa Rani	Social	Music: Pandit Amarnath; Lyrics: Aziz Kashmiri
Ismat	Sibtain Fazli	Mehtab, Nargis, Nandrekar, Pratima Devi, Bhudo Advani, Irshad Ghory, Jani Babu	Social	Music: Pandit Govardhan Prasad; Lyrics: Shams Lakhnavi
Jadui Kismat	A. M. Khan	Shanta Patel, Shiraz, Mehar Bano, Nawaz, Anwaribai, Sultan Baba	Action	Music: Behram Irani; Lyrics: Ehsan Rizvi
Jeevan	M. Sadiq	Mehtab, Wasti, Nirmala Devi, Badri Prasad, Misra, Shyam Kumar	Social	Music: Naushad; Lyrics: D. N. Madhok, Mahir Ul Qadri
Jwar Bhata	Amiya Chakravarty	Dilip Kumar, Mridula Rani, Shamim Bano, Agha, Bikram Kapoor, K. N. Singh, Khalil, Mumtaz Ali	Drama	Debut of Dilip Kumar. Music: Anil Biswas; Lyrics: Narendra Sharma
Kadambari	Nandlal Jaswantlal	Vanmala, Shanta Apte, Pahari Sanyal, Harish, Jeevan, Jagdish Sethi	Costume	Music: Hari Prasanna Das; Lyrics: Miss Kamal
Kaliyan	Kidar Sharma	Motilal, Leela Desai, Ramola, Amarnath, Sulochana Chatterjee, Leela Mishra, Rajinder Singh	Social	Music: G.A. Chishti; Lyrics: Kidar Sharma
Kavita	K. J. Parmar, Mahesh Chander	Ratnamala, Umakant, Jeevan, Kanta Kumari, Badri Prasad, Athavale	Social	Music: Shankar Rao Vyas; Lyrics: Ramesh Gupta
Kiran	Gajanan Jagirdar	Ashok Kumar, Leela Chitnis, Jagirdar, Kanhaiyalal, Kusum Deshpande, Rama Shukal, Rajkumari Shukla, Nand Kishore	Social	Music: Ninu Majumdar; Lyrics:
Kismatwala	Nanubhai Vakil	Prakash, Urmila, Navin Yagnik, Himalayawala, Vatsala Kumtekar, Narmada Shankar, Geeta Sardesai	Action	Music: Shanti Kumar, Master Ratanlal; Lyrics: Shams Lakhnavi
Krishna Bhakta Bodana	JBH Wadia	Sheikh Mukhtar, Ranjit Kumari, Gope, Badri Prasad, Meera, Rani Premlata, Gulab, S.B. Nayampalli	Devotional	Music: Avinash Vyas, Shankar Rao Vyas; Lyrics: Pandit Indra

== L-M ==
Title	Director	Cast	Genre	Notes
Lady Doctor	Wali Saheb	Mumtaz Shanti, Sajjan, Ulhas, Mubarak, Maya Bannerjee, David, Nandrekar	Social	Music: Lyrics: Wali Saheb
Laheri Badmash	Nari Ghadiali	Husnara, Yusuf Effendi, Bibijan, Mannan, Putlibai, Mohammed Hussain, Mohammed Sandow	Action	Music: Avinash Vyas; Lyrics: Sadiq Lakhnavi
Laheri Cameraman	Nari Ghadiali	Benjamin, Shantarin, Agha, Bibijan, Nazira, Sadiq, Munchi Tuthi	Action	Music: K. Narayana Rao; Lyrics: Waheed Qureshi
Lal Haveli	K.B. Lall	Noor Jehan, Surendra, Yakub, Ulhas, Baby Meena Kumari, Maya Bannerjee, Kanhaiyalal, Vatsala Kumtekar, Ghory, Badri Prasad	Social Family Drama	Music: Mir Saheb; Lyrics: Shams Lucknavi
Lalkar	Jayant Desai	Ramola, Ishwarlal, Maya Bannerjee, Mubarak	Social	Music: C. Ramchandra; Lyrics: Pandit Madhur
Lieutenant	Nari Ghadiali	Sharda, Benjamin, Bibijan, Sandow, Nazira, Putlibai, Shahzadi	Action	Music: Lyrics: Mustafa
Maa Baap	V. M. Vyas	Veena, Nazir, Yakub, Majeed, Amirbai Karnataki, Dixit, Jagdish, Rajkumari Shukla	Social Family Drama	Music: Allah Rakha; Lyrics: Roopbani
Maharathi Karna	Bhalji Pendharkar	Prithviraj Kapoor, Swarnalata, Durga Khote, Shahu Modak, Kamalakar Torne, K. N. Singh, Nimbalkar, Vasantrao Pehalwan	Action, Adventure, Drama, War	Music: Datta Korgaonkar; Lyrics: Pandit Shivkumar
Mali	V. Shantaram	Mahipal, Nana Palsikar, Amirbai Karnataki	Devotional	Music: Master Krishnarao; Lyrics: Deewan Sharar, Ratan Piya, Bekal, Mahipal
Man Ki Jeet	Wahid-ud-din Zia-ud-din Ahmed (W. Z. Ahmed)	Nina, Shyam, Tiwari, Rajkumari Shukla, Prakash, Saroj Borkar, Gulab	Social	Music: S. K. Pal; Lyrics: Josh Malihabadi, Bharat Vyas
Manorama	Jayant Desai	Ishwarlal, Leela Chitnis, Maya Banerjee, Mubarak, Noor Mohammed Charlie, Alaknanda, Naseem Jr.	Social	Music: C. Ramchandra; Lyrics: Anjum Pilibhiti
Mauji Jeevan	Poonawala	Sulochana Chatterjee, Harishchandra, Nazira, Ghory, Bibijan, Dalpat, Habib, Devaskar	Action	Music: Gulshan Sufi; Lyrics: Baba Paagal
Maya Nagari	Dhirubhai Desai	Prakash, Rajkumari, Yashwant Dave, Shahzadi, Samson, Fazlu	Fantasy	Music: Veer Singh; Lyrics:
Meena	Phani Majumdar	Hansa Wadkar, Vasanti, Dixit, Shashi Kapoor, Shakir, Ratan Piya	Social	Music: Hari Prasanna Das; Lyrics: Pandit Phani
Meri Bahen a.k.a. My Sister	Hemchandra Chunder	K. L. Saigal, Tulsi Chakraborty, Chandrabati Devi, Sumitra Devi, Nawab, Akhtar Jehan, Hiralal, Tandon	Family Social	Music: Pankaj Mullick; Lyrics: Pandit Bhushan
Miss Devi	C. M. Trivedi	Surendra, Leela Desai, Nazir, Moni Chatterjee, Jagdish, Agha	Social	Music: Ashok Ghosh; Lyrics:
Mujrim	Nitin Bose	Motilal, Leela Desai, Yakub, Jagdish Sethi, Veena, Sunalini Devi, S. Nazir, Cuckoo	Social	Music: Gyan Prakash Ghosh; Lyrics: Rammurti Chaturvedi, Kailash Matwala
Mumtaz Mahal	Kidar Nath Sharma	Khursheed Bano, Chandra Mohan, Yakub, Madhubala, Sulochana Chatterjee, Brijmala, Rajinder Singh	Historical Romance	Music: Khemchand Prakash; Lyrics: Wali Saheb

== N-R ==
Title	Director	Cast	Genre	Notes
O Panchhi	Zahur Raja	Zahur Raja, Radharani, Durrani, Mumtaz, Kalyani Das, Ghory, Durrani, Arif, Motibai	Social	Music: V. A. Balsara; Lyrics:
Pagli Duniya	Aspi Irani	Mumtaz Shanti, Motilal, Sheikh Mukhtar, Pratima Devi, Kanhaiyalal, Kesri	Social	Music: Bulo C. Rani; Lyrics: Swami Ramanand Saraswati, Pandit Indra, Wali Sahab, B. R. Sharma
Panchhi	Barkat Mehra	Manorama, Radha, Zahur Raja, Ajmal, Hari Shivdasani, Ghulam Qadir	Social	Music: Pandit Amarnath; Lyrics: Manohar Sehrai, Akhtar Chughtai
Panna	Najam Naqvi	Geeta Nizami, P. Jairaj, David, Raja Paranjpe, Kusum Deshpande	Drama, War	Music: Amir Ali; Lyrics: Wali Sahab
Parakh	Sohrab Modi	Mehtab, Balwant Singh, Latika, Yakub, Kaushalya, Shah Nawaz, Pratima Devi, Sadiq Ali	Social Drama	Music: Khurshid Anwar, Saraswati Devi; Lyrics: Gafil Harnalvi, Arzu Lakhnavi, Pandit Sudarshan
Parbat Pe Apna Dera	V. Shantaram	Vanamala, Ulhas, Madan Mohan, Kanta Kumari, Shantarin, Kamal, Baby Nalini	Romance	Music: Vasant Desai; Lyrics: Deewan Sharar
Paristan	Mahesh Kaul	Pahari Sanyal, Anjali Devi, Kamal Zamindar, Sunalini Devi, Moni Chatterjee, Padma Bannerjee, Ranjit Kumari, Anwaribai	Fantasy	Music: Ninu Majumdar; Lyrics: Roopdas and Ninu Majumdar
Pattharon Ka Saudagar	Shorey Daulatvi	Paresh Bannerjee, Sheela, Meena Shorey, Al Nisar, K. N. Singh, Sankatha Prasad, Jilloo, Abu Bakar		Music: Mir Sahib; Lyrics: Gafil Harnalvi, Pandit Sudarshan
Pehle Aap	Abdul Rashid Kardar	Wasti, Shamim, Chandabai, Dixit, Jeevan, Vidya, Anwar Hussain		Music: Naushad; Lyrics: D. N. Madhok
Police	Shanti Kumar	Prem Adib, Ratnamala, Ranjana, Shah Nawaz, Jeevan	Social	Music: Pannalal Ghosh; Lyrics: Ramesh Gupta
Qatil	K. L. Khan	E. Billimoria, Shantarin, Baburao, Dilawar, Asharani, Razi, Mannan, Badri Prasad, Fazlu	Action	Music: K. Narayana Rao; Lyrics: Shewan Rizvi
Rajkumar	Phani Majumdar	Chetan Anand, Nargis		Music: Lyrics:
Ramshastri	Vishram Bedekar, Gajanan Jagirdar	Master Vithal, Gajanan Jagirdar, Anant Marathe, Shakuntala Paranjpye, Shanta Apte, Minakshi, Lalita Pawar, Madhu Apte, Hansa Wadkar	Biopic Drama	Music: G. Damle; Lyrics: Qamar Jalalabadi
Rangile Dost	Ramanlal Desai	Benjamin, Sulochana Chatterjee, Agha, Rekha, Munshi Khanjar, Sadiq Ali, Bibijan	Action	Music: Ninu Majumdar; Lyrics: A. G. Badar
Rattan	M. Sadiq	Karan Dewan, Swarnlata, Amir Banu, Wasti, Chandabai, Manju, Rajkumari Shukla, Badri Prasad, Gulab, Azurie	Social Romance	Music: Naushad; Lyrics: D. N. Madhok
Raunaq	Dwarka Khosla	Motilal, Chandra Mohan, Chandraprabha, Noor Mohammed Charlie	Social	Music: C. Ramchandra; Lyrics: I. C. Kapoor

== S-Z ==
Title	Director	Cast	Genre	Notes
Sandhi	Apurba Kumar Mitra	Sumitra Devi, Manorama, Ahindra Choudhury, Bipin Gupta, Ranjit Roy, Devbala, Biman Bandyopadhyay, Hiralal, Mrinalkanti Ghosh	Social	It won three BFJA Awards: Best Film, Best Music Director and Best actress in 1945. Music: Anil Bagchi Lyrics: Pt. Narottam Vyas
Shahenshah Babar	Wajahat Mirza	Khurshid, Sheikh Mukhtar, Yakub, Agha Jan, Anwari, Sulochana Chatterjee	Historical	Music: Khemchad Prakash Lyrics: Shams Lakhnavi, Munshi Aziz, Pandit Indra
Shararat	Kishore Sahu	Kishore Sahu, Protima Dasgupta, Maya Bannerjee, Ramesh Gupta, Moni Chatterjee, Sushil Sahu, Gulab	Social	Music: S. N. Tripathi, Khan Mastana; Lyrics: Rammurti Chaturvedi, A Karim, Ambikesh Kuntal
Shukriya	Harnam Singh Rawail	Amar, Ramola, Zahur Shah, Manorama, Sunder	Social	Music: G.A. Chishti; Lyrics: Shanti Swaroop Madhukar, G A Chishti
Stunt King	Keshav Talpade	John Cawas, Khurshid Jr., Kamala, Dalpat, S. Nazir, Boman Shroff, Putlibai, Agha Jan	Action	Music: Afzal Lahori; Lyrics: Azm Wazidpuri
Subah Shyam	P.C. Barua	P.C. Barua, Jamuna, Tulsi Chakraborty, Devbala, Indu Mukherjee, Ramesh Sinha, Munir, Ravikant	Social Drama	Music: Subal Dasgupta; Lyrics: Faiyyaz Hashmi, Munir Lakhnavi
Suno Sunata Hoon	Raj Kumar	Vanmala, Ulhas, K. C. Dey, Mirza Musharraf, Chandabai, N. A. Ansari	Social	Music: K. C. Dey Lyrics: Rashid Gorakhpuri
Swarna Bhoomi	Bhalji Pendharkar	Leela, Chandrakant Desai, Swarnalata, Ashalata Kashmiri, Sudha Apte, Nandrekar	Social	Music: Pandit Tripathi; Lyrics: Saraswati Kumar Deepak
Taqrar	Hemen Gupta	Motilal, Jamuna, Molina, Nawab, Tulsi Chakraborty, Devbala, Iftekhar, Tandon	Family Social	Music: Sachin Das; Lyrics: Azad, Shanti Swaroop Madhukar
Taxi Driver	S. M. Raza	Sulochana Chatterjee, Dilawar, Rekha Pawar, Baburao, Agha, Shobha, Arvind Kumar, Nazira	Action	Music: Khan Mastana; Lyrics: Shewan Rizvi
Umang	K. M. Multani	Motilal, Chandra Prabha, Sunalini Devi, E. Billimoria, Tara Harish, Sheikh, Geeta Sardesai	Social	Music: Feroz Nizami; Lyrics: Ratan Piya, Sharma
Uss Paar	Chimanlal Luhar	Ishwarlal, Swarnalata, Chandra Mohan, Sulochana Chatterjee, Kanhaiyalal, Noor Mohammed Charlie	Drama	Music: Feroz Nizami; Lyrics: Pandit Madhur
