= Magroor (1950 film) =

1950 film directed by R.D. Mathur

- Poster
- Directed by: R. D. Mathur
- Written by: Agha Jani Kashmiri
- Produced by: J. B. H. Wadia
- Starring: Rehman; Meena Kumari; Paidi Jairaj; Nigar Sultana
- Cinematography: R. D. Mathur
- Edited by: K. Sadanand
- Music by: Sajjad Hussain; Bulo C. Rani; Ram Punjwani
- Release date: 1950
- Language: Hindi

Magroor (transl. Proud) is a 1950 Indian Hindi-language romance film produced by J.B.H. Wadia and directed by cinematographer R.D. Mathur.

Sajjad Hussain, Bulo C. Rani and Ram Punjwani were the film's music directors. Prominent songs from the film include "Toot Gaya", sung by Mohammed Rafi, Shamshad Begum and Rajkumari Dubey, and "Sitamgar Kiya Vaar", sung by Geeta Dutt.

== Plot ==
The film opens with Chandni (Nigar Sultana), an independent, rich and carefree girl taking her cat Mini for drives in the country. On one such drive the cat jumps out and while in chasing her cat down Chandni meets and quarrels with a young farmer (Rehman).

Chandni lives with her intimidating Chachi (Durga Khote), who wants her to settle down with her childhood friend Moti (Paidi Jairaj). Chandni, who isn't ready to marry Moti, confesses the same to him. happy to go along with Chachi’s wishes, but Chandni wants more out of marriage—she wants love, and not just the friendship kind. Moti agrees to help her and when confronted by Chachi, he tells her that he's already married with certain Meenu Rai, but they don't live together due to mutual differences.

In Pune, the real Meenu (Meena Kumari)—whose father has recently died, is working as a typist at "Modern India Agricultural Implements, Ltd." When she receives a cryptic letter from Chachi admonishing her for not sharing her "news" with her, she is puzzled and decides to visit, playing right into Chachi’s hands. Chachi sends for Moti at the same time and when Meenu arrives she locks them in an upstairs room together so that they can sort out their problems. Moti apologizes for the "misunderstanding" profusely, but Meenu is understandably pretty angry and escapes from the balcony after bashing him on the head when he tries to stop her.

Moti confides in Chandni that he has fallen in love at first sight with the feisty Meenu. Chandni, on the other hand, has begun meeting Manohar and sends messages to him via Mini the Cat.

Manohar lives with his Ma (Jilloo Maa) and farms their two pieces of land with pride. In fact, he and Chandni have a lot in common outside of their social backgrounds: both are proud, convinced of their own superiority, but loving and full of fun too. They spend a lot of time teasing each other. Both of them take each other to their respective mothers and get their blessings. Tragically, they get embroiled in a quarrel over where and how they will live after marriage. Their stubborn natures lead them to an impasse and they part bitterly.

Moti, now recovered from his head wound, decides to visit a company which he owns in Pune, Modern India Agricultural Implements Ltd and is surprised to see Meenu there. On seeing him, she kicks him out, not realizing that he is the "big boss".

Meenu puts up a charity show in which Moti confesses his love to Meenu and his sincerity wins her over. Moti is then caught by Chachi who takes him on the pretext of helping Chandni away from the show leaving Meenu to wait for him. Manohar goes to meet Meenu and Moti backstage, where Meenu tells him that Moti hasn’t shown up; he offers to drive her to Moti’s house. But when they get there they see Moti trying to comfort his old friend Chandni and completely misinterpret the scene.

Manohar convinces the heartbroken Meenu to come home with him and open a clinic. She moves in with him and his mother. When Moti and Chandni discover that Meenu and Manohar are now living together, now they misconstrue the situation.

In the end, love wins out over stubbornness and pride.

== Cast ==
- Nigar Sultana as Chandani
- Rehman as Manohar
- Paidi Jairaj as Moti
- Meena Kumari as Meenu Rai
- Durga Khote as Chachi
- Jilloo Maa as Maa (Manohar's mother)
- Mirza Musharraf as Bholeram, Meenu's manager.
- Gulnar
- Hamida
- Kalidas
- Laddan

== Crew ==
- Director – R. D. Mathur
- Producer – J. B. H. Wadia
- Story & Screenplay – Agha Jani Kashmiri
- Cinematography – R. D. Mathur
- Music – Sajjad Hussain, Bulo C Rani, Ram Punjwani
- Lyrics – Raja Mehdi Ali Khan, Mullaji, Zia Sindhi
- Editing – K. Sadanand
- Playback Singers –G. M. Durrani, Mohammed Rafi, Shamshad Begum, Rajkumari Dubey, Geeta Dutt, Vishni Lal, Shrimati Lal, Ishu

== Soundtrack ==
The music of the film was composed by Sajjad Hussain, Bulo C. Rani and Ram Punjwani. Raja Mehdi Ali Khan, Zia Sindhi and Mullaji wrote the lyrics.

Magroor

Soundtrack album by Sajjad Hussain
- Recorded: Unknown
- Genre: Film soundtrack
- Producer: J. B. H. Wadia

Sajjad Hussain chronology
'Khel' (1950)	Magroor (1950)	'Hulchul' (1951)

Magroor

Soundtrack album by Bulo C. Rani
- Recorded: Unknown
- Genre: Film soundtrack
- Producer: J. B. H. Wadia

Bulo C. Rani chronology
'Jogan' (1950)	Magroor (1950)	'Wafa' (1950)

Title	Singer	Lyrics
"Toot Gaya Haye Toot Gaya"	Mohammed Rafi, Shamshad Begum, Rajkumari Dubey	Mullaji
"Badi Bhool Huyi Tujhe Pyar"	Vishni Lal	Zia Sindhi
"Sitamgar Sitamgar Kiya Vaar"	Geeta Dutt	Raja Mehdi Ali Khan
"Hum To Tere Dil Ke Bangle Me Aana Mangta"	G. M. Durrani, Shamshad Begum	Raja Mehdi Ali Khan
"Tera Mujhko Satana"	Ishu, Shrimati Lal	Raja Mehdi Ali Khan
"Tumhe Bago Me Savan Me"	Shamshad Begum	Raja Mehdi Ali Khan
"Unpe Dil Aa Gaya"	Shamshad Begum	Raja Mehdi Ali Khan
"Tik Tik Bole O Bole Mere Dil Ki Ghadi"	Shamshad Begum	Raja Mehdi Ali Khan
