= Paristan (disambiguation) =

Paristan is the term that refers to the home of parīs in Persian mythology.

Paristan may also refer to:

- Paristan (film), a 1994 Indian-Hindi language film
- Paristan (TV series), a 2022 Pakistani television series
- Paristan Lake, a lake discovered in 2018 in Pakistan

== See also ==
- Pari (disambiguation)
