= Bharthari =

Bharthari (IAST: Bhartṛhari) may refer to:

- Bhartṛhari, a Sanskrit grammarian and poet (c. 5th century CE)
- Bharthari (king), a folk hero of India
- Bharthari (film), a 1944 Hindi-language Indian film
- Bharthari, Jaunpur, a village in Uttar Pradesh, India
