= Bhanwara =

- Directed by: Kidar Sharma
- Written by: Kidar Sharma
- Produced by: Ranjit Studios
- Starring: K. L. Saigal; Monica Desai; Arun
- Music by: Khemchand Prakash
- Release date: 1944
- Country: India
- Language: Hindi

Bhanwara is an Indian Hindi language film. It was the third highest grossing Indian film of 1944. It was released in 1944. The film was directed by Kidar Sharma for Ranjit Movietone. It starred K. L. Saigal, Arun, Kamla Chatterjee, Monica Desai, Lala Yakub and Brijmala.

Set in the early 1940s, the film, a musical comedy is about two friends who arrive in the city to find jobs.

== Plot ==
Two friends, Pancham (K. L. Saigal) and Rekhab (Arun) have just arrived in the city. They are looking for jobs and accommodation. Pancham interested in music, finds a job in a music and dance school to teach singing. There he meets Indu (Monica Desai), who teaches dancing to the students. She also happens to be his upstairs neighbour where he has rented a room. Indu lives there with her sister Bindu (Kamla Chatterjee). Rekhab manages to rent a room below a wrestler's (Lala Yakub) accommodation. The two friends fall in love with the two sisters. The wrestler helps Rekhab to develop his physique in order to impress his sweetheart. Through comic situations that follow, the film ends happily.

== Cast ==
- K. L. Saigal as Pancham
- Arun as Rekhab
- Monica Desai as Indu
- Kamla Chatterjee as Bindu
- Lala Yakub as Rekhab's wrestler friend
- Brijmala
- Kesari

== Music ==
The music was composed by Khemchand Prakash with lyrics by Kidar Sharma, and a song written each by Swami Ramanand Saraswati and Pandit Indra.

=== Songlist ===
#	Title	Singer
1	"Ye Woh Jagah Hai"	K. L. Saigal
2	"Diya Jisne Dil"	K. L. Saigal
2	"Hum Apna Unhe Bana Na Sake"	K. L. Saigal
3	"Thukara Rahi Hai Duniya Ham Hain Ki So Rahe Hain"	K. L. Saigal
4	"Muskarate Hue Yun Aankh Churaya Na Karo"	K. L. Saigal
5	"Kya Hamne Bigaada Hai, Kyun Hamko Sataate Ho"	K. L. Saigal, Amirbai Karnataki
6	"Duniya Ki Aankhon Se Sharmane Wale"	Amirbai Karnataki
7	"Mann Ki Bazi Haar Chuka Hai"	Amirbai Karnataki, Arun Kumar
8	"Teri Pee Pee Ki Pukaron Ne"	Amirbai Karnataki
9	"Ye Dua Maango Hasino"	
10	"Ye To Malaria Hai"	Arun Kumar
