= Ek Hi Raasta =

Ek Hi Raasta (lit. 'Only One Road/Way') may refer to these Indian films:

- Ek Hi Raasta (1939 film), a 1939 Hindi social film
- Ek Hi Raasta (1956 film), a 1956 family-drama Hindi film
- Ek Hi Raasta (1977 film), a 1977 Hindi drama film
- Ek Hi Raasta (1993 film), a 1993 Bollywood action film
- Ek Hi Raasta: The Power, the title of the Hindi dub of the 2009 Telugu film Ek Niranjan
