= Insaan =

Insaan (lit. 'human') may refer to:

- Insaan (1944 film), 1944 India film by Babu Bhai Jani
- Insaan (1952 film), 1952 Indian film by Jagdish Sethi
- Insaan (1966 film), 1966 Pakistani film by Zia Sarhadi
- Insaan (1982 film), 1982 Indian film by Narendra Bedi
- Insan, 2005 Indian film by K. Subash

== See also ==
- Insaniyat (disambiguation)
- Insaan Aur Shaitan, 1970 Indian action film by Aspi Irani
- Aadmi Aur Insaan, 1969 Indian Hindi-language film by Yash Chopra
- Janwar Aur Insaan, 1972 Indian Hindi-language film by Tapi Chanakya
- Zehreela Insaan, 1974 Indian Hindi-language film
