= Kamla Chatterjee =

Indian actress (died 1946)

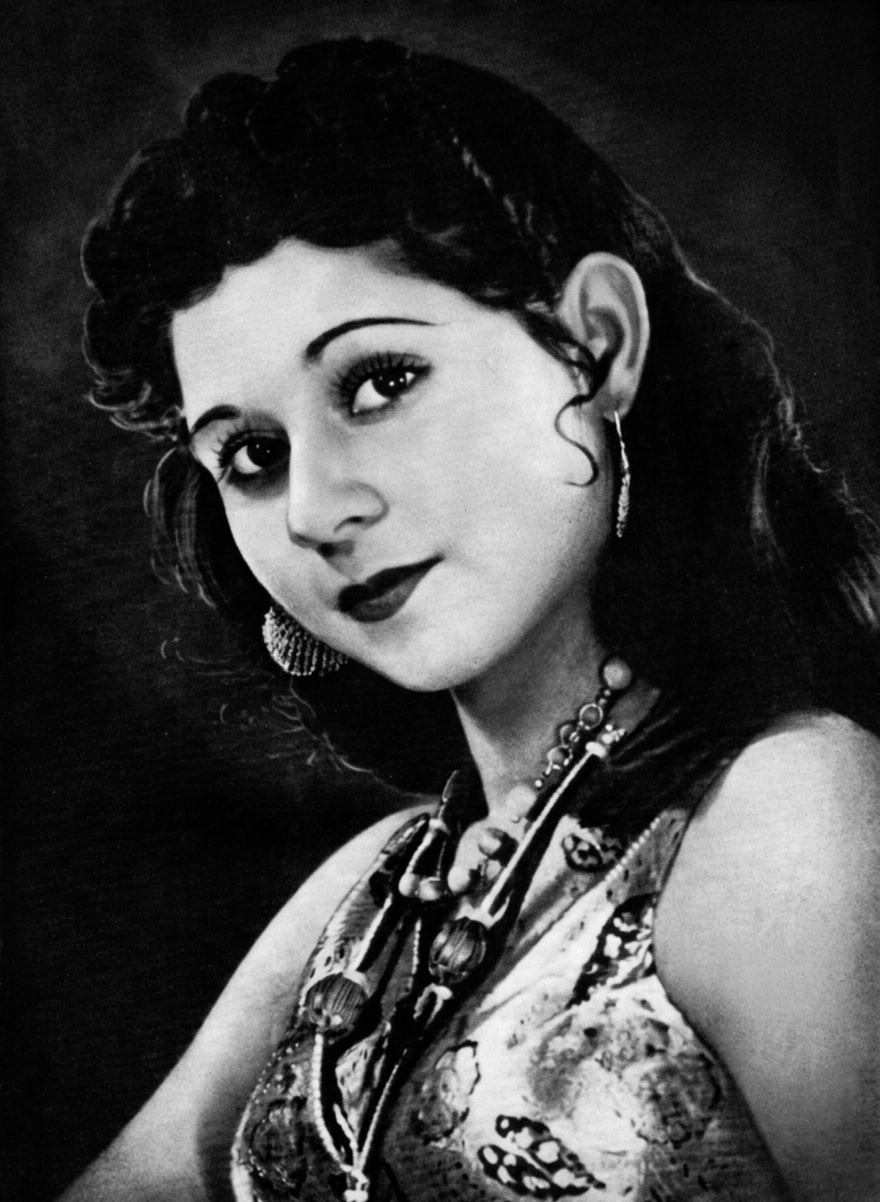
- Chatterjee's portrait from Filmindia, April 1945
- Died: 10 January 1946
- Occupation: Actress
- Years active: 1942–1945
- Spouse: Kidar Sharma (m. 1944)
- Awards: Bengal Film Journalists' Association – Best Supporting Actress Award (1945)

Kamla Chatterjee (Note: Sometimes spelt as "Kamala" and "Chatterji") (pronounced [kəmlɑː tʃət̪ərdʒiː]; died 10 January 1946) was an Indian actress. During her brief career from 1942 to 1945, she appeared in nine films, including Tansen (1943), Bhanwara (1944), and Dhanna Bhagat (1945). She won the Bengal Film Journalists' Association – Best Supporting Actress Award for her performance in Shankar Parvati (1943).

Chatterjee married film director Kidar Sharma in 1944. She died on 10 January 1946.

In her unfinished project Bechara Bhagwan, she was replaced by Baby Mumtaz, who later became known as Madhubala after the film was released as Neel Kamal in 1947.

== Life and career ==
Her early screen appearances included supporting roles in the comedy Aankh Michouli (1942), and Jayant Desai's historical Tansen (1943). She then won the BFJA Award for Best Supporting Actress for her performance in the mythological film Shankar Parvati (1943). On the sets of Vish Kanya, Chatterjee met film director Kidar Sharma and married him in 1944.

The year 1944 saw Chatterjee play leading roles opposite Arun Kumar Ahuja in Aspi's musical Caravan, and in Sharma's comedy Bhanwara. The latter, also starring K. L. Saigal, became one of the highest-grossing Indian films of the year. In 1945, Chatterjee was among the film stars featured in Rangbhoomi Book Depo's Sitaaron Ki Kahaniyan.

Her final release was Sharma's devotional film Dhanna Bhagat (1945). Although the film received a scathing review from critic Baburao Patel, he praised Chatterjee's performance, writing: "In the role of Munni this girl brings life to the screen with every appearance, and one does not like to see the screen without her". A report in The Times of India noted that the film was positively received by audiences.

== Death and aftermath ==
Chatterjee died on 10 January 1946.

Contemporary sources differed regarding the cause of her death: Baburao Patel reported that she died of heart failure, while journalist R. A. Shaikh's book Filmdom (1946) mentioned that she committed suicide for unknown reasons.

Patel published a brief obituary in the February 1946 issue of Filmindia magazine:

Kamla had worked in many Ranjit pictures and had never given a bad performance. She was considered eminently suitable for light roles in which she sang and danced to entertain thousands all over the country. Sweet-natured and charming, Kamla will be missed by one and all in the industry.

Before her death, Sharma had announced a film titled Bechara Bhagwan, featuring Chatterjee and P. Jairaj in leading roles. Sharma later changed the film's title to Neel Kamal, and gave her role to the child actress Baby Mumtaz—who debuted as a leading lady and went on to become known as Madhubala.

== Filmography ==
Year	Title	Role	Director	Notes
1942	Aankh Michouli	Pyari	R. S. Choudhury	
1943	Aadab Arz		Virendra Desai	
1943	Shankar Parvati		Chaturbhuj Doshi	
1943	Tansen	Shehzadi	Jayant Desai	
1943	Gauri		Kidar Sharma	
1943	Vish Kanya		Kidar Sharma	
1944	Caravan		Aspi Irani	
1944	Bhanwara	Bindu	Kidar Sharma	
1945	Dhanna Bhagat	Munni	Kidar Sharma	
1946	Bechara Bhagwan	—	Kidar Sharma	Incomplete film; replaced by Madhubala

== Awards ==
Year	Award	Work	Result	Ref.
1945	Bengal Film Journalists' Association – Best Supporting Actress Award	Shankar Parvati (1943)	Won	
