= Laheri Cameraman =

Laheri Cameraman is a Bollywood film. It was released in 1944.
