= Arun Kumar Ahuja =

Indian actor-producer

- Born: Gulshan Singh Ahuja; 26 January 1918; Gujranwala, Punjab, British India (present-day Punjab, Pakistan)
- Died: 3 July 1998 (aged 80); Mumbai, Maharashtra, India
- Occupations: Actor, Producer
- Years active: 1939–1984
- Spouse: Nirmala Devi (1945–1996; her death)
- Children: 5, including Govinda
- Relatives: Krushna Abhishek (grandson)

Arun Kumar Ahuja (real name Gulshan Singh Ahuja) (26 January 1918 – 3 July 1998), popularly known as Aroon, was an Indian actor and producer who was active in Hindi cinema from the 1940s through to the early 1980s, appearing in over 40 films in both leading and supporting roles. He was married to singer and actress Nirmala Devi and is the father of actor Govinda.

== Career ==
Ahuja was discovered in Lahore where director Mehboob Khan was on a search for newcomers and Ahuja successfully auditioned and made his debut in the 1939 film Ek Hi Raasta for Sagar Movietone. He went on to act in over a dozen films throughout the 1940s and early 1950s playing leading and supporting roles for film banners such as National Studios, Ranjit Studios and Sagar Movietone. He also sang in most of his films as was the tradition in those days before professional singers were used for playback singing.

In 1940, he played perhaps his most well known role in Mehboob Khan's Aurat, where he acted opposite Sardar Akhtar. This film was later remade as the more famous and well known blockbuster Mother India (1957). He was paired with actresses such as Shobhana Samarth, Monica Desai and Khursheed Bano throughout his career. He also made a popular pairing with his wife Nirmala Devi in several films such as Savera (1942), Chalis Karod (1946) and Ghunghat (1946).

In 1948, he set up his own production company named Arun Productions and produced and starred in the film Sehra. Sehra was a box office failure and Ahuja suffered financial losses due to which his career went into decline. He produced another film named Jo Hai Saajan which was never released.

The losses Ahuja suffered from his home productions resulted in him selling off his Bungalow in Mumbai's Carter Road in Bandra and shifting his entire family to a chawl in Virar in the early 1960s. His health failed during this time and his wife Nirmala had to work as a singer on radio and touring concerts to provide for the family of three daughters and two sons.

He continued working occasionally in the following decades, playing small roles in films such as Aulad (1954), Shriman Satyawadi (1960) and Parwana (1971). He made his last film appearance in the 1984 film Abodh.

Arun lived a reclusive life after leaving the film industry and died in 1998 at the age of 81 of a heart attack.

== Personal life and family ==
Born in Gujranwala, Ahuja studied engineering at a college in Lahore in 1937. In 1942, he married singer and actress Nirmala Devi, whom he met after they were cast opposite each other in the film Savera.They were married until Nirmala's death in 1996. Together they had three daughters named Pushpa, Padma and Kamini and two sons Kirti Kumar and actor Govinda.. Ahuja suffered from poor health after the failure of his home productions. The losses he suffered led to him selling off his Bungalow in Mumbai and move to a chawl in Virar. His wife had to provide for the family by singing and touring concerts.

His youngest son Govinda would go on to become a successful actor decades later in the 1990s and his other son Kirti Kumar became a director and occasional actor. Several of his grandchildren would go on to become actors in the film and television industry including Vinay Anand, Krishna Abhishek, Ragini Khanna, Aarti Singh, Soumya Seth and Tina Ahuja. His daughter Padma is the mother of Krishna and Aarti and died in the early 1980s soon after giving birth to Aarti. His eldest daughter Pushpa who is the mother of Vinay Anand, died in 2011 aged 68.

== Selected filmography ==
- Ek Hi Raasta (1939)
- Bhole Bhale (1939)
- Aurat (1940)
- Azad (1940)
- Civil Marriage (1940)
- Bambai Ki Sair (1941)
- Beti (1941)
- Kanchan (1941)
- Patola (1942) Punjabi Movie
- Savera (1942)
- Return of Toofan Mail (1942)
- Andhera (1943)
- Shankar Parvati (1943)
- Chhoti Maa (1943)
- Bhanwara (1944)
- Caravan (1944)
- Bhartrahari (1944)
- Amrapali (1945)
- Chalis Karod (1946)
- Khooni (1946)
- Ghunghat (1946)
- Samaj Ko Badal Do (1947)
- Mera Suhaag (1948)
- Sehra (1948) (Also Producer)
- Usha Haran (1949)
- Sudhar (1949)
- Shaadi Ki Raat (1950)
- Jai Mahalaxshmi (1951)
- Kashmir (1951)
- Aulad (1954)
- Mangu (1954)
- Shriman Satyawadi (1960)
- Hariyali Aur Raasta (1962)
- Pyar Ki Jeet (1962)
- Punar Milan (1964)
- Hameer Hath (1964)
- Raaka (1965)
- Parwana (1971)
- Payal Ki Jhankar (1980)
- Ganga Maang Rahi Balidaan (1981)
- Abodh (1984)
