= Bulo C Rani =

Indian music director

- Born: Bulo Chandiram Ramchandani; 6 May 1920; Hyderabad, Bombay Province, British India
- Died: 24 May 1993 (aged 73); Mumbai, Maharashtra, India
- Occupations: Playback singer, Music director
- Years active: 1943–1972

Bulo C Rani (6 May 1920 – 24 May 1993) was an Indian music director. He was a music director in Hindi language films from the 1940s until the 1960s. He scored music for 71 films from 1943 to 1972, including some evergreens like "hame to loot liya mil ke husn waalo ne" and others.

== Early life ==
Bulo C Rani was born in Hyderabad, Bombay Province, British India (now in Sindh, Pakistan) on 6 May 1920. His birth name was Bulo Chandiram Ramchandani. His father was also a music director. After completing his B.A. degree he joined Ranjit Movietone in 1939.

== Career ==
Bulo's career started in 1939 under Ranjit Movietone. His initial days in the Hindi film industry were full of struggle and hard work. As he started to work, he met some very big personalities who were very prominent names in music then such as Ghulam Haider, D. N. Madhok etc. In the early 1940s, Bulo worked in some films as an assistant to Khemchand Prakash. He assisted Khemchand in the movies like Tansen, Chandni, Sukh Dukh (1942) and Shahenshah Babar (1944). He sang his first playback song "Ruth Na Pyaar Mein" under Khemchand in the film Mehmaan (1942). Though he was an assistant music director, he composed the song "Dukhiya Jiyara" in the film Tansen, sung by Khursheed. The song's credit went to Khemchand Prakash, the composer of that soundtrack. In 1943, he worked as an assistant to Gyan Dutt in two films- Paigham and Shankar Parvati. Despite him composing the song, it was credited as a Gyan Dutt composition. However, he managed to sing in six films that year.

His first film as a composer was Caravan (1944). The same year, he sang in a film Pagli Duniya. In that film, he changed his name temporarily to Bhola. But later on he sang many songs under this name till the end of his career. But he continued as Bulo C Rani for music direction. In 1945, he composed songs in films like Moorti and Pehli Nazar. Moorti was a popular musical and Mukesh sang one of his first hit songs in the film, "Badariya Baras Gai Us Paar". Some of Rani's other hits in the forties include Rajputani (1946) and Anjuman (1948). His best work till date came in the early 1950s - Jogan (1950), Wafa (1951) and Bilwamangal (1954). Bilwamangal was one of his last soundtracks which contained classic songs of Suraiya and C. H. Atma. The songs of that film became popular with one number in particular, "Hum Ishq Ke Maron Ko", which was sung by Suraiya with lyrics by D. N. Madhok. As the new generation of composers like Shankar Jaikishan, Salil Chowdhury, O. P. Nayyar were becoming prominent in Indian cinema, Bulo was no longer as active by the late 1950s. However, he continued to compose for films till the mid-sixties. Some of his songs in this period were hits such as "Humein Toh Loot Liya" (Al Hilaal, 1958), "Mangne Se Jo Maut Mil Jati" (Sunehre Qadam, 1966).

== Filmography ==
Selected list of films from about total 77 films:

- Paigam (1943)
- Caravan (1944)
- Pagli Duniya (1944)
- Moorti (1945)
- Chand Chakori (1945)
- Dharti (1946)
- Rajputani (1946)
- Salgirah (1946)
- Bela (1947)
- Lakhon Mein Ek (1947)
- Anjuman (1948)
- Gunsundari (1948)
- Mitti Ke Khiloune (1948)
- Nanand Bhojai (1948)
- Bhool Bhulayian (1949)
- Darogaji (1949)
- Jogan (1950)
- Magroor (1950)
- Wafa (1950)
- Pyar Ki Baten (1951)
- Izzat (1952)
- Gul Sanobar (1953)
- Aurat Teri Yehi Kahani (1954)
- Bilwamangal (1954)
- Haseena (1955)
- Shikar (1955)
- Aabroo (1956)
- Jahazi Lutera (1957)
- Jeevan Sathi (1957)
- Al Hilal (1958)
- Rai Daich (1958) (Sindhi)
- Tin Tin Tin (1959)
- Pedro (1960)
- Anarbala (1960)
- Room No 17 (1961)
- Jadoo Mahal (1962)
- Shree Ganesh (1962)
- Magic Box (1963)
- Chhupa Rustom (1965)
- Jadoo (1966)
- Sunhere Kadam (1966)
- Bijlee (1972)

== Death ==
Bulo C Rani's death remained largely unreported in the press. Lack of assignments in later life left him frustrated. He committed suicide by self-immolation on 23 May 1993 at the age of 73 years in Mumbai, after his family sold their house at Shivaji Park and moved to Versova.
