= Gauri (1943 film) =

- Directed by: Kidar Nath Sharma
- Starring: Monica Desai; Prithviraj Kapoor; Raj Kapoor; Shamim Bano
- Music by: Khemchand Prakash
- Release date: 1943
- Country: India
- Language: Hindi

Gauri is a 1943 Indian Bollywood film. It was the seventh highest grossing Indian film of 1943. Monica Desai, Prithviraj Kapoor, Shamim Bano and Raj Kapoor played the lead roles in the film.

== Cast ==
- Monica Desai
- Prithviraj Kapoor
- Shamim Bano
- Kamla Chatterjee
- Raj Kapoor
