= Chalis Karod =

1946 film

- Directed by: Nanabhai Bhatt
- Produced by: Chandra Art
- Starring: Nirmala; Arun; Yakub; Agha; Gope
- Cinematography: Sardar Malik; Mohan Segal
- Music by: Gobindram
- Release date: 1946
- Country: India
- Language: Hindi

Chalis Karod (Forty Crores) is a Bollywood film that was released in 1946. The film was directed by Nanabhai Bhatt for Chandra Art Productions. It had music composed by Gobindram and starred Nirmala Devi, Yakub, Arun, Agha, Gope and Shantarin.
