= Rajkumari Dubey =

Film playback singer

Background information
- Born: Rajkumari Dubey; 1924; Benares, Benares State, United Provinces, British India (present-day Varanasi, Uttar Pradesh, India)
- Died: 2000 (aged 75–76) India
- Genres: playback singing
- Occupation: Singer
- Instrument: Vocalist
- Years active: 1934 – 1977

Rajkumari Dubey (1924 – 2000), better known by her first name, Rajkumari, was an Indian playback singer who worked in Hindi cinema of 1930s and 1940s. Best known for her songs, "Sun Bairi Baalam Sach Bol Re" in Bawre Nain (1950), "Ghabaraa Ke Jo Hum Sar Ko Takraayan" in Mahal (1949) and "Najariya Ki Maari" in Pakeezah (1972).

== Biography ==
She had much softer and sweeter voice with a narrow range than the leading singers of the time, Zohrabai Ambalewali, Amirbai Karnataki and Shamshad Begum. In the next two decades, she sang for 100 films, till the early 1950s, when Lata Mangeshkar changed the playback-singing scene in India.

=== Career ===
She was 10 years old when she recorded her first song for His Master's Voice in 1934 and she started her career as a stage artiste. Vijay Bhatt and Shankar Bhatt of Prakash Pictures spotted her during one of her shows. They liked her voice and persuaded her to discontinue acting on stage as it would spoil her voice (In those days, there were no microphones and you had to shout to be heard). So she quit theatre, and became an employee of Prakash Pictures as an actress and singer.

Rajkumari's first film with them was a Hindi-Gujarati bilingual called Sansar Leela Nayi Duniya. She got important roles in films like Aankh Ka Tara and Turki Sher (1933). She was the heroine in Bhakt Ke Bhagwan and Insaaf Ki Topi (1934). In those days she often acted opposite Zakaria Khan (late actor Amjad Khan's father, whose screen name was Jayant). She also used to sing for popular music director Lallubhai. He gave music to films starring Rajkumari ji like Nai Duniya, alias Sacred Scandal (1934) (Sansaar Leela in Gujarati version), Laal Chitthi, alias Red Letter (1935), Bombay Mail (1935), Bambai Ki Sethaani (1935) and Shamsheer-e-Arab (1935). She began getting fed up with having to watch on her figure and decided to stick to just singing as a career. After she quit Prakash Pictures, she began playback singing for actresses like Ratnamala, Shobhana Samarth, etc. and soon she became the first female playback singer of Indian cinema.

She sang many Gujarati and Punjabi songs. Even though she was not formally trained to sing, she was very good at picking up what her composers taught her. They thought she was a trained singer! She was able to also establish herself as a classical singer and excelled in singing and voice production within the framework of classical forms of thumri and dadra. Among her peers were Shamshad Begum, Zohrabai Ambalewali, Juthika Roy, Zeenat Begum, etc. Both Shamshad and Zohrabai had resounding voices with a high range, while Rajkumari had a soft and very sweet voice with a small range. She sang quite a few songs with Talat Mahmood and Mukesh. She did not get much opportunity to sing with Mohammed Rafi – mainly because Lata Mangeshkar was a fast upcoming singer at the time. She sang with Noor Jehan in Naukar (1943). She never sang with K. C. Dey, but she did sing songs composed by him, as well as his nephew, Manna Dey. She also sang many popular Punjabi-language film songs for the veteran Punjabi music directors Hansraj Behl and Sardul Kwatra in the 1950s.

=== Later life ===
Rajkumari was married very late in life. Her husband was V.K. Dubey who was from Benares, (Uttar Pradesh) where he spent a lot of his time (because he owned a shop there), while she settled in Bombay. He later joined her in Bombay. Rajkumari Dubey died in 2000.

During her career, she would go on to sing songs for Neel Kamal, a Raj Kapoor and Madhubala starrer, and Hulchul (1951); but her two most famous films would be Bawre Nain (1950), where she sang for Geeta Bali "Sun Bairi Baalam Sach Bol Re" and Mahal (1949), where she sang "Ghabrekar Ke Jo Hum Sir Ko Takraayan" picturised on Vijayalakshmi and "Chun Chun Gunguruva Baje Jhumba", a duet with Zohrabai Ambalawali. By this time, however, Lata Mangeshkar had shot to fame, relegating many female singers in the industry to the sidelines.

She sang her only song for O. P. Nayyar in the 1952 movie Aasmaan, which was his debut movie; "Jab Se Pee Piya Aan Base". The story goes that he was considering Lata Mangeshkar for the song. (Rest of the songs of the movie are sung by Geeta Dutt and C. H. Atma). When somebody told this to Lata, she said something about him which led to a misunderstanding. Angered, O. P. Nayyar made Rajkumari sing this song and never repeated her. He never used Lata to sing for him as well.

Rajkumari endured a long dry spell until music director Naushad spotted her singing in the chorus for his background score for Pakeezah (1972). Naushad was much taken aback by this, having greatly respected her in her heyday, and heartbroken to hear that she was reduced to singing in the chorus to make ends meet. As a result, he gave her an entire song to herself in Pakeezah, Najariya ki Mari. Her last film song was recorded for R. D. Burman in the film Kitaab; "Har Din Jo Beeta". Rajkumari also appeared in a British TV programme called Mahfil on Channel 4, a Samandar Films production, produced by Firdous Ali and Mahmood Jamal. In this programme, she sang a set of her famous film songs and ghazals; the caption on one of the songs, "Yeh raat phir na aayge", from the film Mahal, cites that the song was pictured on Zohra (and not Madhubala or Vijayalaxmi). The programme was aired on 24 March 1991. Rajkumari died in poverty in early 2000.

== Discography ==
- Snehlata (1936)
- Naukar (1943)
- Humayun (1945)
- Neel Kamal (1947)
- Parwana (1947)
- Mahal (1949)
- Bawre Nain (1950)
- Posti (1950)
- Hulchul (1951)
- Aasmaan (1952)
- Kaude Shah (1953)
- Waris (1954)
- Pakeezah (1972)
- Kitaab (1977) (Producer-Director Gulzar's film)
- Yaba Hay Tera Liya (1978)
- Taher Zalzala Hain Na (2000)

== Songs with G. M. Durrani ==
- "Jhuum rahi baagon men bhigi" - Yateem (1945)
- "Barasan Laagi Badariya" - Nai Duniya (1942)
- "Dil Loot Liya Ji" - Nai Duniya (1942)
- "Prem Ne Mann Mein Aag Lagayi" - Nai Duniya (1942)
- "O Tujhko Nainon" - Meharbani (1950)
- "Udd Jaau Main Sajan Re" - Kavita (1944)
- "Baras Gayi Raam Badariya Kaari" - Station Master (music director Naushad)
- "Dheere-Dheere Bol Mere Raja" - Ishara (1943) (Music director Khwaja Khurshid Anwar) (Lyricist – D. N. Madhok)
- "Gote Da Haar Ve" - Kurmai (Punjabi-language film) (1941) (with Iqbal Begum)

== Bibliography ==
- Anantharaman, Ganesh (January 2008). Bollywood Melodies: A History of the Hindi Film Song. Penguin Books India. ISBN 978-0-14-306340-7.
