= Maa Baap =

- Directed by: V. M. Vyas
- Produced by: Sunrise Pictures
- Starring: Veena; Nazir; Yakub
- Music by: Alla Rakha
- Release date: 1944
- Country: India
- Language: Hindi

Maa Baap is a Bollywood film. It was released in 1944. The film was directed by V. M. Vyas. It was produced under the Sunrise Pictures banner. The film starred Veena, Nazir, Yakub, Majeed, Amirbai Karnataki, Dixit, Jagdish, Rajkumari Shukal. The music was composed by Alla Rakha and the lyrics were by Roopbani.
