= Ek Hi Raasta (1939 film) =

- Directed by: Mehboob Khan
- Written by: Babubhai A. Mehta; Wajahat Mirza
- Produced by: Sagar Movietone
- Starring: Sheikh Mukhtar; Arun Kumar Ahuja; Anuradha; Kanhaiyalal
- Cinematography: Faredoon Irani
- Music by: Anil Biswas
- Production company: Sagar Movietone
- Release date: 1939
- Running time: 149 minutes
- Country: India
- Language: Hindi

Ek Hi Raasta (Hindi: एक ही रास्ता, The Only Way) is a 1939 Hindi social film directed by Mehboob Khan. The director of photography was Faredoon Irani with story by Babubhai A. Mehta and Wajahat Mirza. The film was produced by Sagar Movietone. The cast included Arun Kumar Ahuja, Sheikh Mukhtar, Anuradha, Kanhaiyalal and Harish. This was the debut film of Sheikh Mukhtar, who went on to act in and direct several successful films, and Arun Kumar Ahuja, a prominent actor in the 1940s. Ek Hi Raasta is a film about wrongs of society and its laws. It was one of the early Hindi films to make a noticeable application of WW II.

== Plot ==
Raja (Arun Kumar Ahuja) an orphan, Mangoo (Sheikh Mukhtar), a pickpocket, and Vithal (Harish), a hansom cab driver are friends. They live in the city where Mala (Anuradha) and her father (Gani) arrive from the village. Mangoo gets into an altercation with Mala’s father and kills him. Banke (Kanhaiyalal) kidnaps Mala and sells her to a wealthy man. Mala manages to escape and stays with Raja who helps her, both falling in love in the process. World War II intervenes and the three friends enlist. The film then revolves around the return from war and the killing of a rapist by one of them. He’s tried in court and convicted for killing the rapist.

== Cast ==
- Arun Kumar Ahuja as Raja
- Sheikh Mukhtar as Mangoo
- Anuradha as Mala
- Jyoti
- Harish
- Kanhaiyalal as Banke
- Jagdish Raj
- A. Banbasi as Madan
- Devi as Mala’s stepmother
- Gani as Mala’s father
- Dewaskar
- Mohan as Vithal

== Music ==
The music director was Anil Biswas with lyrics written by Kidar Sharma and Pandit Indra Chandra.

=== Track listing ===
| # | Title |
|---|---|
| 1 | "Ae Ishq Mujhe Husn Se Begaana Bana" |
| 2 | "Chhalke Ras Ki Gagariya Saari" sang by Anil Biswa, Wahidan Bai |
| 3 | "Bhai Hum Pardesi Log Humein Kaun Jaane" |
| 4 | "Dil Ki Kathni Piya Na Jaane" sang by Anil Biswas |
| 5 | "Din Jaaye Raat Aaye Yeh Bhed Koi Batlaye" |
| 6 | "Kab Chal Diya Ladakpan" |
| 7 | "Mori Kadar Na Karat Kanhai" |
| 8 | "Mujhe Mil Jaayegi Unki Umariya" |
| 9 | "Pa Liya Jisne Tujhe" |
| 10 | "Saawan Aaye Na Aaye, More Sajan Aayenge" |
| 11 | "Teri Nazaron Mein Gharache Khar Hun Main" |
| 12 | "Tu Dekh Zara Dil Ka Darpan" sang by Anil Biswas |
