= Stunt King =

- Release date: 1944
- Country: India
- Language: Hindi

Stunt King is a Bollywood film. It was released in 1944.
