= Mumtaz Mahal (film) =

1944 film

- Directed by: Kidar Nath Sharma
- Written by: Pandit Indra (story)
- Produced by: Ranjit Movietone
- Starring: Khursheed Bano; Chandra Mohan; Madhubala; Kajjanbai
- Cinematography: Gordanbhai Patel
- Edited by: E. Tiprudi
- Music by: Khemchand Prakash
- Distributed by: Ranjit Movietone
- Release date: 16 October 1944
- Country: India
- Language: Hindi
- Budget: ₹15 lakhs
- Box office: ₹35 lakhs

Mumtaz Mahal is a 1944 Indian Hindi-language historical epic film, directed by Kidar Nath Sharma and starring Khursheed Bano and Chandra Mohan.

Madhubala (below) and Khursheed Bano (above) in a publicity still for the film

Madhubala also stars, in one of her earliest pictures. The film opened to negative reviews due to its distortion of history, but became a commercial success, and the sixth highest grossing Indian film of 1944.

== Plot ==
Mumtaz Mahal showcases the love story of Mughal emperor Shah Jehan and his favourite wife Mumtaz Mahal, and the former's efforts to create Taj Mahal for housing the tomb of Mahal after her death.

== Cast ==
- Khursheed Bano as Mumtaz Mahal
- Chandra Mohan as Shah Jehan
- Madhubala as Jahanara Begum (Credited as "Baby Mumtaz)
- Kajjanbai as 'Queen' Noor Jehan
- Rajendra as Lala Yaqoob

== Production ==
The film Mumtaz Mahal was produced by Ranjit Movietone, a Bombay-based film studio. Kidar Sharma directed the film, with Pandit Indra credited for the story. Khemchand Prakash composed the music, while Gordanbhai Patel and E. Tiprudi handled the cinematography.

Mumtaz Mahal was Madhubala's second film after Basant (1942). It was also her first of the five films she made under Ranjit Movietone as a child artist.

== Release ==
=== Critical reception ===
Mumtaz Mahal opened to overwhelmingly negative reviews. A review published in Filmindia magazine by Baburao Patel read: "It is difficult to say exactly how bad Mumtaz Mahal is. Stretch your imagination to its widest and see if you can fit in this dirty picture."

An audience named Ammunuddin's reaction to the film was: "[In] Mumtaz Mahal, history has been mercilessly murdered, facts have been deliberately distorted, the story is crudely conceived and the acting and even the music is intensely boring. Historical records reveal that it was during Shah Jehan's time that the Mughal empire was at its height of power. When will our producers and other big guns of the Indian Film Industry put art before Mammon worship?"

- Historical Accuracy: The film was accused of "murdering history" and being a "gross distortion" of facts. FilmIndia stated that the picture "presents incorrectly the characters" and "the incidents of those times," calling it a "deliberate distortion of historical truth."
- Plot and Storytelling: The narrative was described as "crudely conceived," "ill-formed," "uneducated," and full of "nonsense." The portrayal of Mumtaz Mahal's death due to "overwork" was highlighted as a "lie."
- Character Portrayal: Chandramohan's depiction of Shah Jehan was criticized as being a "clumsy milk-sop" and a "simpleton," incapable of managing his family or ruling. The overall characterizations were seen as misinterpretations of historical figures.
- Production Quality: Despite the historical setting, elements like the harem scenes were called "dirty," suggesting poor artistic representation in the magazine's view.
- Intent: FilmIndia suggested that the film exploited its historical subject for commercial gain rather than artistic merit, questioning Kidar Sharma's directorial ambition.

One FilmIndia article also mentioned that Kidar Sharma supposedly wished for Sardar Chandulal Shah to send Mumtaz Mahal to Hollywood, believing that people in India "can't understand the picture," a sentiment which the magazine found misguided.

=== Box office ===
Nevertheless, Mumtaz Mahal was a commercial success. The film earned an estimated amount of ₹3.5 million at the box office.
