= Insaniyat =

Insaniyat (lit. 'humanity') may refer to:

- Insaniyat (1955 film), a 1955 Indian Hindi-language action film by S. S. Vasan, starring Dilip Kumar, Dev Anand and Bina Rai
- Insaniyat (1967 film), a Pakistani Urdu-language film
- Insaaniyat (1974 film), an Indian Hindi-language drama film by Prayag Raj, starring Shashi Kapoor and Madhu
- Insaniyat (1988 film), a 1988 Indian Hindi-language film starring Kimi Katkar
- Insaniyat (1994 film), a 1994 Indian Hindi-language action film by Tony Juneja, starring Amitabh Bachchan, Sunny Deol and Chunky Panday

== See also ==
- Insaan (disambiguation)
