= Bandukwali =

- Release date: 1944
- Country: India
- Language: Hindi

Bandukwali is a Bollywood film. It was released in 1944.
