= Maya Nagari =

- Directed by: Dhirubhai Desai; Natwar Shyam
- Written by: Natwar Shyam
- Starring: Rajkumari; Yashwant Dave; Chandrika
- Release date: 1944
- Country: India
- Language: Hindi

Maya Nagari is a Bollywood film. It was released in 1944.

== Cast ==
- Rajkumari
- Yashwant Dave
- Chandrika
- Samson
- F.M. Butt
- Kashinath
- Fazlu
- Nazir
