= Jeevan (film) =

- Release date: 1944
- Country: India
- Language: Hindi

Jeevan is a Bollywood film. It was released in 1944.
