= Tumhari Kasam =

- Movie Poster
- Directed by: Ravi Chopra
- Written by: Kamleshwar (dialogues)
- Screenplay by: Kamleshwar
- Story by: Tikam
- Produced by: C.V.K. Sastry
- Starring: Jeetendra; Moushmi Chatterjee
- Cinematography: Narayan Rao Das
- Edited by: S.B. Mane, Pran Mehra
- Music by: Rajesh Roshan
- Production companies: Associated Films & Finance Corporation
- Release date: 9 March 1978
- Running time: 137 minutes
- Country: India
- Language: Hindi

Tumhari Kasam (transl. I swear by you) is a 1978 Indian Hindi-language drama film, produced by C.V.K. Sastry on Associated Films & Finance Corporation banner and directed by Ravi Chopra. The film stars Jeetendra and Moushmi Chatterjee, with music composed by Rajesh Roshan.

== Cast ==
- Jeetendra as Anand
- Moushumi Chatterjee as Vidya
- Navin Nischol as Sunil Verma
- Padmini Kapila as Seema
- Raju Shrestha as Vidya's brother
- Jagdish Raj as Police Inspector
- Achala Sachdev as Anand's mother
- Pradeep Kumar as Anand's father
- Manmohan Krishna
- Paintal (comedian)
- Jankidas
- Lalita Pawar as aunt
- Roopesh Kumar as goon
- Vimal Ahuja
- Prem Sagar

== Soundtrack ==
The music is by Rajesh Roshan with lyrics by Anand Bakshi. The songs are sung by Asha Bhosle, Kishore Kumar, Lata Mangeshkar, Mukesh and Preeti Sagar.

#	Title	Singer(s)
1	"Main Husn Ka Hoon Diwana"	Kishore Kumar
2	"Mera Naam Raja"	Preeti Sagar
3	"Aye Ladki Pyar Karegi"	Kishore Kumar, Lata Mangeshkar
4	"Hum Dono Milke"	Mukesh, Asha Bhosle
5	"Aye Mast Hawa"	Lata Mangeshkar
6	"Aye Ladki-2"	Kishore Kumar, Lata Mangeshkar
