= V. C. Desai =

Indian film director

Virendra Chimanlal Desai (12 October 1913 – 1 July 1970) was an Indian film director who worked in Hindi cinema. He was the son of producer and studio owner Chimanlal Desai, the founder of Sagar Movietone. Desai initially worked for Metro-Goldwyn-Mayer in Bombay before joining his father's company. He made his directorial debut with Shri Thyagaraja (1937) and subsequently co-directed Gramophone Singer (1938), starring Surendra and Bibbo. Following the dissolution of Sagar Movietone in 1940, Desai joined National Studios, where he remained until 1942.

At National Studios, Desai "discovered" the teenage actress Nalini Jaywant and persuaded her conservative father to allow her to enter films, subsequently casting her in the 1941 hit Radhika. The headline of the film's review in The Times of India read, "Virendra Desai's Fine Direction In National's Radhika". Desai also gave singer Mukesh his first opportunity in films with Nirdosh (1941), in which Mukesh both acted and sang alongside Jaywant. His other films for National Studios included Sanskar (1940) and Savera (1942).

Desai married Nalini Jaywant in 1943 and founded Nalini Pictures with her. The company's only venture, Gunjan (1948), was a box office failure. Jaywant divorced him in 1954, alleging infidelity on his part. According to Cinemaazi, Desai "fell on hard times" and spent his final years living in a caravan in Bangalore before his death in 1970. In 1986, NFDC's publication Indian Cinema recalled him as "an erstwhile highly successful film director [...] now virtually forgotten in the industry."

== Filmography ==
| Year | Title | Notes | Ref. |
|---|---|---|---|
| 1937 | Shri Thyagaraja | | |
| 1938 | Gramophone Singer | Co-directed with Ramachandra Thakur | |
| 1939 | Sadhana | Co-directed with M. Thakore | |
| 1940 | Sanskar | Also released as Chhoti Bahu | |
| 1941 | Nirdosh | | |
| 1941 | Radhika | | |
| 1942 | Savera | | |
| 1948 | Gunjan | | |
