= Beda Paar =

- Release date: 1944
- Country: India
- Language: Hindi

Beda Paar is a Bollywood film. It was released in the summer of 1944.
