= Savera (1942 film) =

1942 Hindi films

- Directed by: V. C. Desai
- Written by: K.B. Lall
- Starring: Arun Kumar Ahuja; Nirmala Devi; Kesari
- Release date: 1942
- Country: India
- Language: Hindi

Savera is a Bollywood drama film directed by V. C. Desai. It was released in 1942.

== Cast ==
- Shobhna Samarth
- Nirmala Devi
- Kesari
- Yakub Khan
- Mehboob Khan
