= Mukesh (singer) =

Indian playback singer (1923–1976)

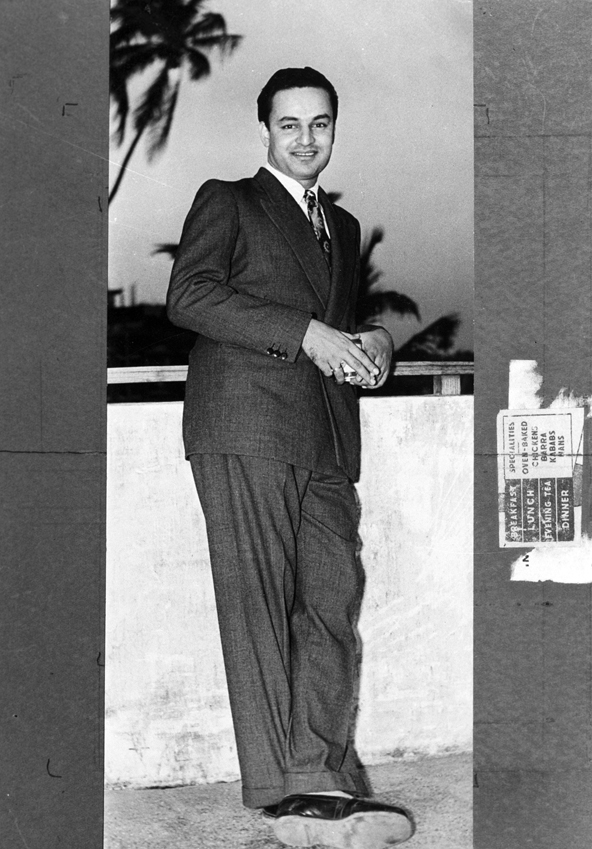
- Born: Mukesh Chand Mathur; 22 July 1923; Delhi, British India
- Died: 27 August 1976 (aged 53); Detroit, Michigan, U.S.
- Other names: Voice of the Millennium, Tragedy King
- Occupation: Playback singer
- Years active: 1940–1976
- Spouse: Saral Trivedi Raichand (m. 1946)
- Children: 5, including Nitin Mukesh
- Relatives: Mathur family
- Awards: 1 National Film Awards; 3 Bengal Film Journalists' Association Awards; 4 Filmfare Award for Best Male Playback Singer

Mukesh Chand Mathur (22 July 1923 – 27 August 1976), better known mononymously as Mukesh, was an Indian playback singer. He is considered to be one of the most popular and acclaimed playback singers of the Hindi film industry. Among the numerous nominations and awards he won, his song "Kai Baar Yuhi Dekha Hai" from the film Rajnigandha (1973) won him the National Film Award for Best Male Playback Singer.

Mukesh was also popular as being the voice of actors Raj Kapoor, Manoj Kumar, Feroz Khan, Sunil Dutt and Dilip Kumar.

== Early life ==
Mukesh was born in Delhi in a Mathur Kayastha family on 22 July 1923. His parents were Zorawar Chand Mathur, an engineer, and Chandrani Mathur. He was the sixth in a family of ten children. The music teacher who came home to teach Mukesh's sister, Sundar Pyari, found a pupil in Mukesh, who would listen from the adjoining room. Mukesh left school after the 10th grade and worked briefly for the Department of Public Works. He experimented with voice recordings during his employment in Delhi and gradually developed his singing abilities and also his musical instrumental skills.

== Singing career ==
Mukesh's voice was first noticed by Motilal, a distant relative, when he sang at his sister's wedding. Motilal took him to Bombay (now Mumbai) and arranged for singing lessons by Pandit Jagannath Prasad. During this period Mukesh was offered a role as an actor-singer in a Hindi film, V. C. Desai's Nirdosh (1941). His first song was "Dil Hi Bujha Hua Ho To" as an actor-singer for Nirdosh written by Neelkanth Tiwari. His first hit song as a playback singer was "Dil Jalta Hai To Jalne De" for actor Motilal in 1945 with the film Pehli Nazar with music composed by Anil Biswas and lyrics written by Aah Sitapuri.

Mukesh was such a fan of singer K. L. Saigal that in his early years of playback singing he used to imitate his idol. In fact, it is said that when K. L. Saigal first heard the song "Dil Jalta Hai...", he remarked, "That's strange, I don't recall singing that song".

Mukesh created his own singing style with the help of music director Naushad Ali, who helped Mukesh to come out of his Saigal style and create his own style. Naushad gave him songs for the film Andaz. Initially Mukesh was the ghost voice of Dilip Kumar in this movie and Mohammed Rafi sang for Raj Kapoor. He delivered many Hits for Naushad in films like: Anokhi Ada (1948), Mela (1948), Andaz (1949). Other composers who used Mukesh voice for great Dilip Kumar in hit songs like "Jeevan Sapna toot gaya" were Anil Biswas in Anokha Pyar, Ye Mera Diwanapan hai, Shankar–Jaikishan in Yahudi and Suhana Safar and Dil Tadap Tadap ke, Salil Choudhary in Madhumati. However, later Dilip Kumar choose Rafi as his ghost voice and Mukesh became the ghost voice of Raj Kapoor. Mukesh recorded highest number of songs for Shankar–Jaikishan, that is 133 songs followed by Kalyanji Anandji ie 99 songs. Out of 4 Filmfare Awards, Mukesh won 3 awards for Shankar–Jaikishan songs.

In 1974, Mukesh received National Film Award for Best Male Playback Singer for the song "Kai Baar Yuhi Dekha Hai" from Rajnigandha (1974), and Filmfare Awards for the songs "Sab Kuch Seekha Humne" in the movie Anari (1959), "Sabse Bada Naadan Wahi Hai" in Pehchaan (1970), "Jai Bolo Beimaan Ki" in Beimaan (1972) (all the three songs composed by Shankar–Jaikishan) and "Kabhi Kabhie Mere Dil Mein", the title song of film Kabhie Kabhie (1976) (composed by Khayyam). A total of around 1,300 songs were sung by him. This number is less than those sung by some of his contemporaries, but the fact is that Mukesh emphasised on quality rather than quantity. The comparatively fewer songs sung by him in the 1970s can be attributed to his failing health due to his worsening heart problem.

Mukesh sang many songs for Kalyanji Anandji music director duo. Mukesh sang more songs with the K-A duo after Shankar–Jaikishan. From "Naina hai jadoo bhare..." Bedard Zamana Kya Jane (1958) composed by Kalyanji alone as Kalyanji Virji Shah, and "Main hoon mast madari..." Madari (1959) as the first Kalyanji-Anandji-Mukesh combo, to "Chahe aaj mujhe napasand karo" Darinda 1977, the K-A, Mukesh combination gave numerous popular songs like "Chhalia mera naam...", "Mere toote hue dil se...", "Dum dum diga diga" Chalia (1960), "Mujhko iss raat ki tanhai mein..." Dil Bhi Tera Hum Bhi Tere (1960), "Hum chhod chale hain mehfil ko..." (Ji Chahta Hai), "Humne tumko pyar kiya hai jitna..." (Dulha Dulhan), "Chal mere dil lehraake chal..." Ishara and "Dheere se chalo..." Johar Mehmood in Goa, "Main to ek khwab hoon..." and "Chand si mehbooba ho..." Himalay Ki Godmein(1965), "Waqt kartaa jo wafaa..." Dil Ne Pukara, "Deewanon se yeh mat poocho..." Upkar, "Khush raho har khushi hai..." Suhaag Raat and "Humsafar ab yeh safar kat jaayega..." Juari, "Chandi ki deewaar..." and "Le chal le chal mere jeevan saathi..." Vishwas (1969), "Koi jab tumhara hriday tod de..." Purab Aur Paschim, "Darpan ko dekha..." Upaasna, "Jo tumko ho pasand..." Safar and "Mujhe nahin poochni tumse beeti baatein..." Anjaan Raahen (1974).

Out of the numerous songs he gave his voice to, "Kahin door jab din dhal Jaaye" from Anand (1971), "Ek Pyaar ka Nagma hai" from Shor (1972), "Maine Tere Liye Hi Saat Rang Ke" from Anand (1971), "Sab Kuch Seekha Humne" from Anari (1959), "Jeena yahan marna yahan" and "Kehta hai Joker" from Mera Naam Joker (1970) are the most popular among his fans and followers.

In his career, Mukesh sung 110 songs for Raj Kapoor, 47 songs for Manoj Kumar and 20 songs for Dilip Kumar.

== As an actor and producer ==
Mukesh started his career as an actor singer in the film Nirdosh in 1941, with Nalini Jaywant as his heroine. His second film was Adab Arz in 1943. He played a guest role in Raj Kapoor's film Aah in 1953. He acted as a hero in the film Mashooka in 1953, opposite Suraiya and in the film Anurag (1956) (he was also the co-producer and composer in the film), opposite Usha Kiran and Mridula Rani. Mukesh also produced a film Malhar (1951) with hero Arjun & heroine Shammi with Darling Films.

== Appreciation ==
Mukesh was a favourite of renowned Indian spin-bowler Bhagwath Chandrasekhar. When the sound of a Mukesh song drifted to the pitch, Chandrasekhar's acknowledgement of the tribute would bring a roar from the crowd. Sunil Gavaskar wrote that sometimes he hummed a Mukesh tune on the field to inspire Chandra. Chandra's passion affected team-mates Kirmani, Gundappa Viswanath, and even some journalists.

Google commemorated Mukesh on his 93rd birthday anniversary in 2016.

Department of Post released a commemorative postage stamp on his 100th birth anniversary.

== Personal life ==
Mukesh married Saral Trivedi, daughter of Raichand Trivedi, a millionaire. With no proper house, an erratic income and what was then considered in India a supposedly "immoral" profession (singer in movies), the consent of Saral's father for this marriage could not be obtained and Mukesh and Saral were forced to elope. They got married in a temple in Kandivali on 22 July 1946, Mukesh's 23rd birthday, with the help of the actor Motilal and from the residence of R. D. Mathur. Everyone made dire predictions of unhappy days and divorce, but both weathered the lean days and celebrated their thirtieth wedding anniversary on 22 July 1976, four days before his departure for the USA. The couple had five children – Rita, the singer Nitin, Nalini (d. 1978), Mohnish and Namrata (Amrita). The actor Neil Nitin Mukesh is a grandson of Mukesh (son of Nitin).

== Death ==
Mukesh died of a heart attack on 27 August 1976 in Detroit, Michigan, USA, where he had gone to perform in a concert. That morning, he got up early and went to take a shower. He came out short of breath and complaining of chest pains. He was rushed to a hospital but was pronounced dead. The rest of the concert was completed by Lata Mangeshkar and his son Nitin Mukesh. His body was flown to India by Mangeshkar, where a grand funeral ceremony was held in the presence of several actors, with personalities of the Indian film industry and fans paying tribute. When news of his death reached his acquaintance and actor Raj Kapoor, he burst into tears, and remarked, "I have lost my voice," which is a testimony to the association of Mukesh's voice (in playback) to the immensely popular songs of Raj Kapoor's films.

After Mukesh's death, his newer, hitherto unreleased, songs were released in 1977 in films such as Dharam Veer, Amar Akbar Anthony, Khel Khiladi Ka, Darinda and Chandi Sona. 1978 also saw a considerable number of Mukesh songs in films such as Aahuti, Paramatma, Tumhari Kasam and Satyam Shivam Sundaram, where Mukesh sang his last film song Chanchal Sheetal Nirmal Komal for Raj Kapoor's younger brother, Shashi Kapoor. From 1980 onwards, Mukesh's voice was heard in many later released films such as Shaitan Mujarim, Premika, Patthar Se Takkar (1980), Sanjh Ki Bela, Maila Anchal (1981), Aarohi (1982), Chor Mandali (1983), Nirlaj (1985), Love and God (1986), Shubh Chintak (1989), and his last release Chand Grahan in 1997.

== Awards ==
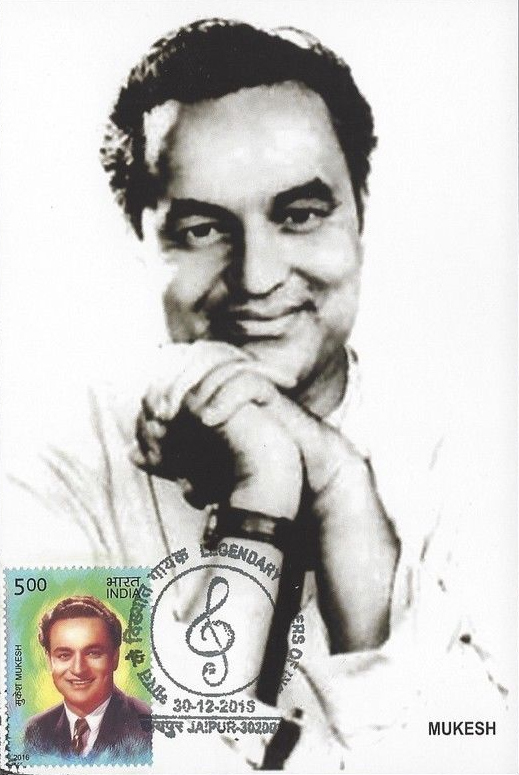
Mukesh on a 2016 postcard from the series Legendary Singers of India

=== National Film Awards ===
- 1974 – National Film Award for Best Male Playback Singer for the song "Kai Baar Yuhi Dekha Hai" from the film Rajnigandha

=== Filmfare Awards ===
==== Won ====
Year	Song	Film	Music director(s)	Lyricist
1959	"Sab Kuch Seekha Humne"	Anari	Shankar Jaikishan	Shailendra
1970	"Sabse Bada Naadan"	Pehchan	Shankar Jaikishan	Varma Malik
1972	"Jai Bolo Beimaan Ki"	Be-Imaan	Shankar Jaikishan	Varma Malik
1976	"Kabhi Kabhie Mere Dil Mein"	Kabhi Kabhie	Khayyam	Sahir Ludhianvi

==== Nominated ====
Year	Song	Film	Music director(s)	Lyricist
1962	"Hothon Pe Sacchai Rehti Hai"	Jis Desh Men Ganga Behti Hai	Shankar Jaikishan	Shailendra
1965	"Dost Dost Na Raha"	Sangam	Shankar Jaikishan	Shailendra
1968	"Sawan Ka Mahina"	Milan	Laxmikant Pyarelal	Anand Bakshi
1971	"Bas Yehi Apradh"	Pehchan	Shankar Jaikishan	Neeraj
1972	"Jane Kahan Gaye Woh Din"	Mera Naam Joker	Shankar Jaikishan	Hasrat Jaipuri
1972	"Kahin Door Jab Din Dhal Jaye"	Anand	Salil Chowdhury	Yogesh
1973	"Ek Pyar Ka Nagma Hain"	Shor	Laxmikant Pyarelal	Santosh Anand
1975	"Main Na Bhoolonga"	Roti Kapada Aur Makaan	Laxmikant–Pyarelal	Santosh Anand
1977	"Ek Din Bik Jayega"	Dharam Karam	Rahul Dev Burman	Majrooh Sultanpuri
1977	"Main Pal Do Pal Ka Sahayar Hoon"	Kabhi Kabhie	Khayyam	Sahir Ludhianvi
1978	"Suhani Chandni Raatein"	Mukti	Rahul Dev Burman	Anand Bakshi
1978	"Chanchal Shital Nirmal Komal"	Satyam Shivam Sundaram	Laxmikant–Pyarelal	Anand Bakshi

=== Bengal Film Journalists' Association Awards ===
Winner

- 1967 – Best Male Playback Singer for Teesri Kasam
- 1968 – Best Male Playback Singer for Milan
- 1970 – Best Male Playback Singer for Saraswatichandra

== Filmography ==
As an actor:

Movie	Year
Nirdosh	1941
Dukh Sukh	1942
Adab Arz	1943
Aah	1953
Mashuqa	1953
Anurag	1956

As a producer: Malhar (1951)

As a singer (partial):

Movie	Year
Nirdosh	1941
Ek Raat	1942
Dukh Sukh	1942
Moorti	1945
Pehli Nazar	1945
Gaon	1947
Neel Kamal	1947
Anokha Pyar	1948
Mela	1948
Aag	1948
Suhaag Raat	1948
Vidya	1948
Anokhi Ada	1948
Andaz	1949
Barsaat	1949
Shair	1949
Lekh	1949
Sabak	1950
Ankhen	1950
Bawre Nain	1950
Arzoo	1950
Awaara	1951
Malhar	1951
Badal	1951
Afsana	1951
Shisham	1952
Aah	1953
Mashuqa	1953
Shree 420	1955
Miss Coca Cola	1955
Daku	1955
Anuraag	1956
Raj Hath	1956
Rani Rupmati	1957
Sharada	1957
Parvarish	1958
Phir Subah Hogi	1958
Madhumati	1958
Yahudi	1958
Bedard Zamana Kya Jane	1958
Anari	1959
Kanhaiya	1959
Guest House	1959
Chhoti Bahen	1959
Duniya Na Mane	1959
Main Nashe Mein Hoon	1959
Madari	1959
Santan	1959
Ujala	1959
Chhalia	1960
Bombai Ka Babu	1960
Mud Mud Ke Na Dekh	1960
Hum Hindustani	1960
Singapore	1960
Banjarin	1960
Bindiya	1960
Kala Aadmi	1960
Tu Nahin Aur Sahi	1960
Mera Ghar Mere Bachche	1960
Jis Desh Mein Ganga Behti Hai	1960
Patang	1960
Dil Bhi Tera Hum Bhi Tere	1960
Shriman Satyawadi	1960
Ek Phool Char Kante	1960
Saranga	1961
Char Diwari	1961
Aas Ka Panchhi	1961
Pyaar Ka Saagar	1961
Zindagi Aur Khwab	1961
Sasural	1961
Sanjog	1961
Modern Girl	1961
Opera House	1961
Nazrana	1961
Chhaya	1961
Aashiq	1962
Prem Patra	1962
Hariyali Aur Rasta	1962
Tower House	1962
Soorat Aur Seerat	1962
Phool Bane Angaare	1963
Godaan	1963
Bandini	1963
Ek Dil Sau Afsane	1963
Dil Hi To Hai	1963
Akeli Mat Jaiyo	1963
Parasmani	1963
Bluff Master	1963
Meri Surat Teri Ankhen	1963
Ji Chahta Hai	1964
Dulha Dulhan	1964
Sangam	1964
Ishaara	1964
Chhoti Chhoti Baten	1965
Himalay Ki God Mein	1965
Saheli	1965
Lal Bangla	1966
Biwi Aur Makan	1966
Teesri Kasam	1966
Devar	1966
Boond Jo Ban Gayee Moti	1967
Gunahon Ka Devta	1967
Raat Aur Din	1967
Upkar	1967
Farz	1967
Raaz	1967
Milan	1967
Diwana	1967
Around The World	1967
Wahan Ke Log	1967
Saraswatichandra	1968
Anokhi Raat	1968
Duniya	1968
Saathi	1968
Juaari	1968
Bandhan	1969
Do Raaste	1969
Sambandh	1969
Satyakam	1969
Vishwas	1969
Mere Humsafar	1970
Chetna	1970
Holi Ayee Re	1970
My Love	1970
Mera Naam Joker	1970
Kati Patang	1970
Pehchan	1970
Mere Apne	1971
Maryada	1971
Anand	1971
Ek Bar Mooskura Do	1972
Annadata	1972
Raaste Kaa Patthar	1972
Shor	1972
Be-Imaan	1972
Raja Rani	1973
Manchali	1973
Rajnigandha	1974
Phir Kab Milogi	1974
Roti Kapda Aur Makaan	1974
Anjaan Raahen	1974
Dharam Karam	1975
Sunehra Sansar	1975
Sanyasi	1975
Do Jasoos	1975
Dharmatma	1975
Prem Kahani	1975
Dus Numbari	1976
Chhoti Si Baat	1976
Daku Rani Ganga	1976
Kabhie Kabhie	1976
Adalat	1976
Karm	1977
Darinda	1977
Dharam Veer	1977
Amar Akbar Anthony	1977
Mukti	1977
Satyam Shivam Sundaram	1978
Tumhari Kasam	1978
