= Rangile Dost =

1944 film

- Release date: 1944
- Country: India
- Language: Hindi

Rangile Dost is a Bollywood film. It was released in 1944.
