= Chand Chakori =

1945 film

- Directed by: Kidar Sharma
- Starring: Mumtaz Shanti; Surendra
- Music by: Bulo C Rani
- Release date: 1945
- Country: India
- Language: Hindi

Chand Chakori is a 1945 Indian Bollywood film. It was the sixth highest-grossing Indian film of 1945.
