= Dhanna Bhagat (film) =

1945 Indian film

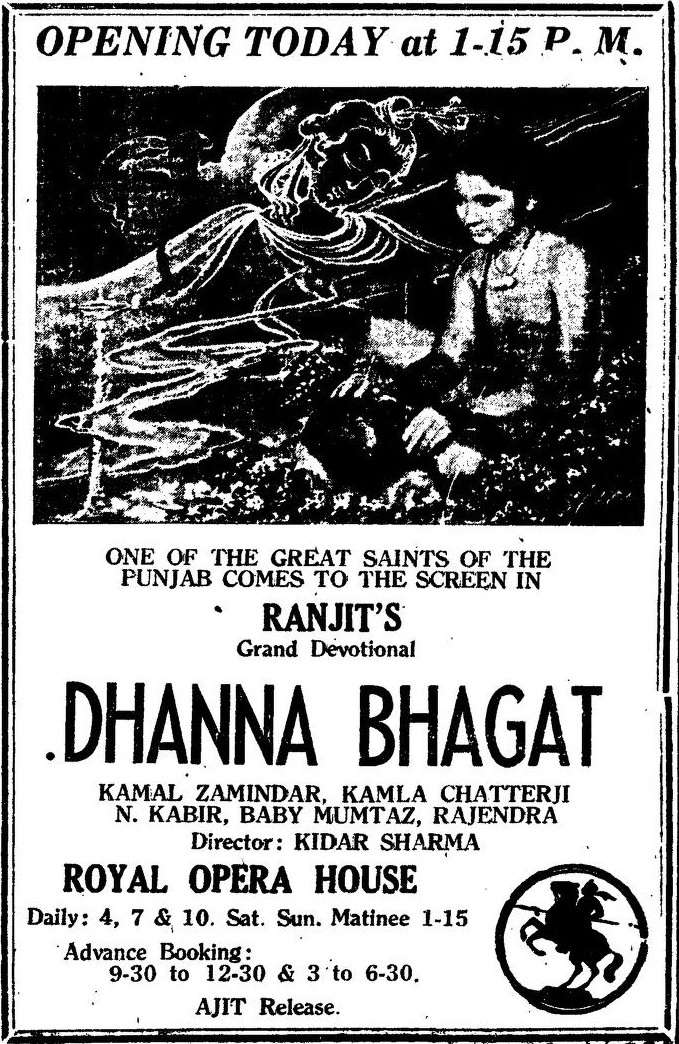
- Advertisement published in The Bombay Chronicle (1 December 1945)
- Directed by: Kidar Sharma
- Starring: Kamla Chatterjee<br >Kamal Zamindar<br >Baby Mumtaz
- Music by: Khemchand Prakash
- Release date: 1945
- Country: India
- Language: Hindi

Dhanna Bhagat is a 1945 Hindi-language devotional film directed by Kidar Sharma. It features Kamla Chatterjee and Kamal Zamindar in lead roles, alongside Baby Mumtaz (Madhubala) who appears as a child artiste. The film's music was composed by Khemchand Prakash.

The film is based on the life of the mystic poet Dhanna.

== Cast ==
- Kamla Chatterjee as Munni
- Kamal Zamindar as Dhanna
- Baby Mumtaz (Madhubala) as Munni (child)

== Soundtrack ==
The soundtrack for Dhanna Bhagat was composed by Khemchand Prakash. He used the bhairavi thumri "Suni Ho Nandkumar", which was sung by Khan Mastana.

Madhubala (Baby Mumtaz) sang two songs for the film: "Meri Maiya Main Gaiya Charaun" and "Meethe Bhojan".

== Reception ==
Film critic Baburao Patel was critical of Sharma's work as a director and dismissed Dhanna Bhagat as "a picture which deserves to be avoided in spite of its devotional theme" for it contains "nothing in it to entertain nor even to provoke thought."

According to a report by The Times of India, the film was positively received by audiences.
