= Radhika (film) =

- Directed by: V. C. Desai
- Starring: Nalini Jaywant
- Release date: 1941
- Country: India
- Language: Hindi

Radhika is a 1941 Indian Hindi-language film directed by V. C. Desai. The film marked the screen debut of Nalini Jaywant. It was reviewed by The Times of India on 15 March 1941, under the title "Nalini Jaywant Shines In Radhika".
