= Shankar Parvati =

- Release date: 1943
- Country: India
- Language: Hindi

Shankar Parvati is a Bollywood film. It was released in 1943.

== Cast ==
- Sadhana Bose
- Mahipal
- Kamla Chatterjee
