= Tansen (film) =

1943 Indian Bollywood film directed by Jayant Desai

- Directed by: Jayant Desai
- Starring: K. L. Saigal; Khursheed Bano
- Music by: Khemchand Prakash; Pandit Indra (lyrics)
- Release date: 1943
- Country: India
- Language: Hindi

Tansen (Hindi: तानसेन) is a 1943 Indian Hindi language film directed by Jayant Desai, featuring K. L. Saigal and Khursheed Bano in the lead roles.

The film was based on Tansen, the 16th century musician in the court of Mughal emperor, Akbar. The film featured 13 hit songs, performed by the leads, including "More Balapan Ke Saathi", "Rum Jhum Rum Jhum Chal Tihari", "Kahe Guman Kare Gori", "Bina Pankh Ka Panchhi", "Sapt Suran Teen Gram", "Diya Jalao" and "Baag Laga Doon Sajni". It was the second highest grossing Indian film of 1943.

In 2009, it was reported that another film based on the life of Tansen would be directed by Satish Kaushik.

== Plot ==
Tansen becomes orphan at a very young age and lives with his paternal uncle. He goes to a music teacher to learn music and returns to his native village after many years of training. In the village, the shepherdess Tani is considered a gifted singer, and Tansen falls in love with her. Tani rescues an elephant and Tansen tames it by his singing. This captures the attention of Raja Ramchandra, of Rewa State. He becomes Tansen's friend. At the same time in Agra, the Mughal emperor Akbar regrets that there is no musician in his navratnas. Akbar sends a few of his workers to the countryside to find the best musician. While his workers are searching, they come across Tansen, who while singing for Tani brings a leafless tree to bloom. The workers are overwhelmed at this and ask Tansen to go to the court of Akbar along with them. Tansen refuses at first by saying that he will sing for no one other than his sweetheart Tani. After repeated persuasions, he finally agrees to go to Agra where he enthralls Akbar by his singing. Akbar appoints him as one of his navratnas. The other musicians in the royal court see this move as a threat to their reputation and status in the court.

On Akbar's birthday, Tani goes to Agra to meet Tansen and in order to meet her, Tansen refuses to sing on the king's birthday. Upon meeting Tani, Akbar tells her that Tansen is married and asks her to leave. He does so thinking that a broken heart will inspire even better music from Tansen. When Akbar later asks Tansen to sing, he refuses to do so saying that he would accept even the death penalty, but would not sing. One of the court musicians, Zehen Khan tells Akbar and his sick princess that the Deepak raag has the magic of igniting things. Akbar asks Tansen to sing the Deepak raag, but again he refuses. Finally, on repeated persuasions by the sick princess, Tansen agrees to sing. Tansen ignites the candles placed near him when he is singing. He continues singing in extreme heat and gets badly burnt. When Akbar learns from Azam Khan (the court physician) that Zehen Khan and the other court musicians were plotting against Tansen, he orders the arrest of them all. Meanwhile, Tansen's condition worsens. Birbal, the court philosopher suggests to Akbar that a singer who can sing the Malhar raag (known for bringing heavy rain) should be searched for. Akbar himself searches for such a singer, but is unable to find one. The dying Tansen wishes to meet his friend Raja Ramchandra. Along the way to his village, Tansen meets Tani near a fountain and she heals him by singing the Megh Malhar raag.

== Cast ==
- K. L. Saigal as Tansen
- Khurshid as Tani
- Mubarak as Emperor Akbar
- Nagendra as Birbal
- Kamla Chatterjee as Shehzadi (Akbar's daughter)
- Bhagwandas
- Kesari

== Production ==
The film was produced under the banner of Ranjit Movietone and directed by Jayant Desai, who went on to direct another historical film in 1945, based on the life of the Mauryan ruler Chandragupta Maurya. Kundan Lal Saigal was under a contract for the film company New Theaters and Jayant Desai had borrowed him for playing the lead role in the film. During the opening of the film, Jayant Desai declared that the film was a love story between Tansen and the shepherdess Tani. Also in the beginning, Saigal himself spoke about the music maestro Tansen. Munshi Dil had written the dialogues of the film. The film was released during the period when the Muslim League was demanding the creation of a separate state for Muslims. The film's portrayal of the Mughal era was seen as "affirming the place of the Muslim in India rather than interpreting history." The film has also been categorised as one of the films in which the "Muslims were portrayed in terms of exotic otherness."

== Music ==
The music for the film was composed by Khemchand Prakash. The lyricists were Pandit Indra and D. N. Madhok. The lead actor Kundan Lal Saigal had also sung some of the film's songs. Khemchand Prakash composed all the songs based on classical music and based them on the Dhrupad genre. Saigal had sung the song "Diya Jalao" in the Deepak raag,

"Kahe Gumaan Kare Re Gori" in Gaara raag and "Baag Laga Dun Sajani" in the Megh Malhar raag. In a radio programme, famous composer Anil Biswas credited Khamchand Prakash for sticking to historical perspective and musical traditions by making K.L. Saigal sing the song 'Sapt Suran Teen Gram' in the Dhrupad style, instead of the Khayal genre, which was done in other films on Tansen, as he knew well that during the life and times of Tansen, the Khayal genre did not exist. Prakash had used a piano for the music of the film. This was considered a minor flaw in a period film. The song "Mohe Panghat Pe Nandlal Chedd Gayo Re" composed by the musician Naushad for the film Mughal-e-Azaam was inspired by the song Kahe Gumaan Kare Re Gori.

Title	Singer(s)	Raga
"Ghata Ghanaghor Ghor"	Khursheed Bano	Megh Malhar
"Aao Gori Aao Shyama"	Khursheed Bano	
"Kahe Guman Kare Re Gori"	Kundan Lal Saigal	
"Rumajhum Rumajhum Chaal Tihaari"	Kundan Lal Saigal	Shankara (raga)
"Baag Laga Dun Sajani"	Kundan Lal Saigal	
"More Balpan Ke Sathi Chhaila Bhul Jaio Na"	Kundan Lal Saigal, Khursheed Bano	
"Sapt Suran Tin Graam Gaavo Sab Gunijan"	Kundan Lal Saigal	Darbari Kanada
"Ho Dukhiya Jiyara Rote Naina"	Khursheed Bano	
"Ab Raja Baye More Balam"	Khursheed Bano	
"Binaa Pankh Panchhi Hun Main"	Kundan Lal Saigal	
"Diya Jalao Jag Mag"	Kundan Lal Saigal	
"Din Soona Sooraj Bina"	Kundan Lal Saigal	
"Baraso Re"	Khursheed Bano	Megh Malhar
