= Ram Panjwani =

Indian writer, folk singer and educationist

- Born: 20 November 1911; Larkana, Sindh, British India
- Died: 31 March 1987 (aged 75)
- Occupations: Writer, educationist, singer
- Known for: Sindhi literature
- Awards: Padma Shri; Sahitya Akademi Award
- Website: Rampunjwani.com

Ram Prataprai Panjwani (November 20, 1911 – March 31, 1987) was an Indian writer, folk singer and educationist, known for his contributions to Sindhi literature.

== Early life ==
Panjwani was born at Larkana in the Sindh province of erstwhile British India (presently in Pakistan). on 20 November 1911 He graduated from Mumbai University in 1934 and started his career as a teacher at the D. J. Sindh Government Science College, Karachi. After Indian independence in 1947, he relocated to Mumbai and started working as a member of faculty of Jai Hind College, Mumbai in their Sindhi department. Later, he moved to Mumbai University as the reader in Sindhi department and headed the department from 1974 to 1976.

== Works ==
Panjwani published several literary works in Sindhi language, starting with his debut novel, Padma (1939) which preceded works like Qaidy, Sharmila, Asanjo Ghar, Ahe Na ahe and Shall Dhiaru Na Jaman. He also acted in four films, Jhulelal, Ladlee, Hojmalo and Shall Dhiaru Na Jaman, the last one based on his own novel. He received Sahitya Akademi award in 1964 for his work, Anokha Azmda. He was the founder of the cultural forum, Sita Sindhu Bhavan and was the editor of the Sindhi publication, Hindustan Sindhi Weekly. The Government of India awarded him the fourth highest Indian civilian honour of Padma Shri in 1981. He wrote the first Sindhi-language film Ekta (1942).

Death

Ram Panjwani died in Chandigarh on 31 March 1987 at the age of 75.
