= Bhartrahari =

- Directed by: Chaturbhuj Doshi
- Produced by: P. B. Zaveri
- Starring: Surendra; Mumtaz Shanti; Aroon; Kajjanbai; Sulochana Chatterjee
- Music by: Khemchand Prakash
- Production company: Navin Pictures
- Release date: 1944
- Country: India
- Language: Hindi

Bharthari (also known as Bhartrahari, or Bhartrihari) is a Hindi language film. It was released in 1944. The film was directed by Chaturbhuj Doshi for Navin Pictures and produced by P. B. Zaveri. The music was composed by Khemchand Prakash and the lyricist was Pandit Indra Chandra. The cast included Surendra, Mumtaz Shanti, Kajjanbai, Aroon, Sulochana Chatterjee and Yashwant Dave. It was the fifth-highest-grossing Indian film of 1944.

A devotional film, it was based on the approx. 1st century BC King Bharthari of Ujjaini, of folklore. The Hindi film version shows his love for his wife Pingla, his abdication in favour of his brother Vikramaditya, and his subsequent renunciation, going on to become a famous saint-poet.

== Cast ==
- Surendra
- Mumtaz Shanti
- Kajjanbai
- Aroon
- Sulochana Chatterjee
- Yashwant Dave
- Nagendra

== Tamil version ==
Bharthruhari was made in Tamil in 1944 and directed by K. Subramanyam. The film starred Serukalathur Sama, B. Jayamma, G. Pattu Iyer, N. S. Krishnan and V. N. Janaki. The music was composed was V. K. Parthasarathy Ayyangar. The film had a duet sung by Jayamma and Krishnan.

== Soundtrack ==
Music director was Khemchand Prakash and one of the notable songs by Amirbai Karnataki was the semi-classical bol Banav Thumri, "Chanda Des Piya Ke" in Raga Marubihag. The bhajan sung by Surendra, "Bhiksha De De Maiya Pingla" followed the pattern set by K. C. Dey in Dhoop Chhaon (1935) "Teri Gathari Mein Laaga Chor" for bhajan singing and became popular. Lyricist was Pandit Indra and the singers were Amirbai Karnataki, Surendra and Jehanara Kajjan.

=== Song list ===
#	Title	Singer
1	"Bhiksha De De Maiya Pingala"	Surendra, Amirbai Karnataki
2	"Chanda Desh Piya Ke Ja"	Amirbai Karnataki
3	"Kuhkat Koyaliya Kunjan Mein"	Jehanara Kajjan
4	"Ghunghat Pat Nahin Kholun"	Jehanara Kajjan
5	"Bhanwara Madhuban Mein Mat Ja"	Surendra
6	"Alakh Naam Ras Pina Prani Do Din Jag Me Jina"	Surendra
7	"Soona Mandir Mera Sakhi Ri"	Amirbai Karnataki
8	"Jago Panchi Aayo Madhur Prabhat"	
9	"Prem Bina Sab Suna Hota"	Surendra
10	"Alakh Niranjan Jay Jay Jan"	
11	"Mora Dhire Se Ghunghat Hataye Piya"	Amirbai Karnataki
