= Caravan (1944 film) =

1944 Indian film

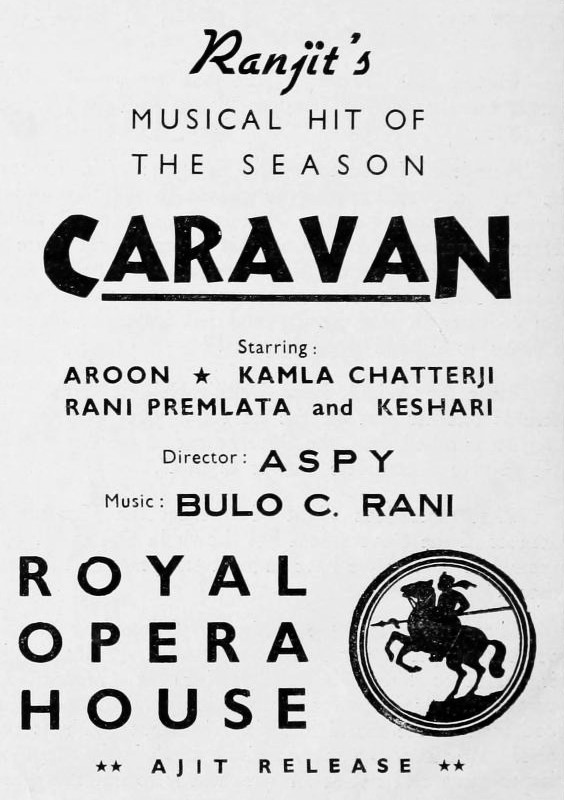
- Advertisement published in Filmindia (April 1945 issue)
- Directed by: Aspi Irani
- Produced by: Ranjit Studios
- Starring: Arun Kumar Ahuja; Kamla Chatterjee
- Music by: Bulo C Rani
- Release date: 1944
- Country: India
- Language: Hindi

Caravan is a 1944 Hindi-language film directed by Aspi Irani. A musical produced by Ranjit Studios, it features Arun Kumar Ahuja (credited as Arun), Kamla Chatterjee and Rani Premlata in leading roles. Its music was composed by Bulo C Rani.

== Plot ==
The film follows the lives of wandering tribes, focusing on their music, dance, emotions and code of honour. Kamla Chatterjee and Arun portray a gypsy couple, while Rani Premlata plays a stage star who desires Arun's character.

== Cast ==
- Arun Kumar Ahuja
- Kamla Chatterjee
- Rani Premlata

== Release ==
Caravan was released in Bombay (now Mumbai) at the Royal Opera House in March 1945. By late April, it was reported to be in its seventh week of exhibition at the theatre.

== Reception ==
Critic Baburao Patel awarded the film 2 stars out of 5. He specified it as a "gipsy [sic] social" and found it an "interesting story indifferently handled".
