= Jogan (film) =

- Directed by: Kidar Nath Sharma
- Produced by: Chandulal Shah
- Starring: Dilip Kumar; Nargis
- Cinematography: D. C. Mehta
- Edited by: S. G. Chavande
- Music by: Bulo C Rani
- Release date: 24 February 1950
- Running time: 116 minutes
- Country: India
- Language: Hindi

Jogan is a 1950 Hindi–language romantic drama film directed by Kidar Nath Sharma, the film stars Dilip Kumar and Nargis. It features the hit song "Ghunghat Ke Pat Khol" sung by Geeta Dutt. Rajendra Kumar, having debuted a year before, plays a small role.

A box office success, the film became the fourth highest earning film of 1950, earning an approximate gross of Rs. 1,12,00,000 and a net of Rs. 62,00,000.

== Plot ==
Vijay is intrigued and attracted by the young hermit who recently came to the village and tries to talk to her to get to know why she chose the life of a hermit at such a young age.

After many attempts, the hermit finally tells him what made her choose this life and also that before she met him she had peace of mind. She used to write love poems before her family forced her to marry an old man and she ran away from her home and became a hermit. Vijay asks her if she can lend her the book of poems she wrote.

She finds her peace of mind wavering due to his existence and his compelling devotion towards her. Eventually she decides to leave the village so that she does not fall prey to the binding emotions that pose a risk to her soul's journey onwards.

Vijay confronts her asking whether by changing the place, her sentiments will change too but to no avail. The hermit implores him to not follow her any further than the tree at the border of the village.

The hermit at the advice of her guru fasts for days at a time to complete her penance. Vijay often times starts to go find her but cannot go beyond the tree remembering her request of him.

One such day someone comes to him to give him a book of love poems. Upon getting it Vijay is extremely happy and wonders if he can go and meet her. He is told that now he can only visit her grave.

== Cast ==
- Dilip Kumar as Vijay
- Nargis as Surabhi alias Meera
- Pratima Devi as Maha Maa
- Purnima as Anjani
- Tabassum as Mangu
- Rajendra Kumar as Raj (Vijay's Friend)

== Soundtrack ==
While music direction was provided by Bulo C. Rani, the devotional poems were taken from Meera Bai's poetry while the rest of the songs were written by Buta Ram Sharma 'Ashk', Indra Chandra, director Kidar Nath Sharma himself and his brother Himmat Rai Sharma. The songs were sung by Shamshad Begum, A. R. Ojha, Talat Mahmood and Geeta Dutt.

Song	Singer(s)	Lyricist / Poet	Raga
"Jin Aankhon Ki Neend Haraam Hui Unn Aankhon Ka Naam Woh Kya Jaane..."	Shamshad Begum	Buta Ram Sharma 'Ashk'	
"Kaahe Nainon Ne Naina Daale Re (2), Oh Pardesiya (2)..."	Shamshad Begum	Buta Ram Sharma 'Ashk'	
"Uthat Chale Avadhoot..."	Geeta Dutt and A. R. Ojha	Meera Bai	
"Aeri Main Toh Prem Deewaani..."	Geeta Dutt	Meera Bai	
"Ghunghat Ke Patt Khol Re Tohe Piya Milenge..."	Geeta Dutt	Meera Bai	Darbari Kanada
"Main Toh Girdhar Ke Ghar Jaaoon..."	Geeta Dutt	Meera Bai	Bhairavi
"Mat Jaa Mat Jaa Jogi..."	Geeta Dutt	Meera Bai	Bhairavi
"Dagmag Dagmag Dole Naiyya..."	Geeta Dutt	Kidar Nath Sharma	
"Zara Tham Jaa Tu Ae Saawan..."	Geeta Dutt	Himmat Rai Sharma	
"Chanda Khele Aankh Michowli..."	Geeta Dutt	Indra Chandra	
"Daaro Re Rang, Daaro Re Rasiya..."	Geeta Dutt	Indra Chandra	
"Gend Khelun (2) Kanha Ke Sang Main Saawan Ke Sang..."	Geeta Dutt	Indra Chandra	
"Pyaare Darshan Deejo Aaj..."	Geeta Dutt	Indra Chandra	
"Sakhi Ri Chitchor Nahin Aaye..."	Geeta Dutt	Indra Chandra	
"Sundarta Ke Sabhi Shikaari, Koi Nahin Hai Pujaari..."	Talat Mahmood	Indra Chandra	
