= Bharthari, Jaunpur =

Bharthari is a village in Khutahan, Jaunpur district, Varanasi division, Uttar Pradesh, India.
