= Nirdosh (1941 film) =

- Directed by: V. C. Desai
- Starring: Nalini Jaywant
- Release date: 1941
- Country: India
- Language: Hindi

Nirdosh is a 1941 Indian Hindi- and Marathi-language film directed by V. C. Desai. The film marked one of the earliest screen appearances of Nalini Jaywant, preceding her breakthrough with Aankh Michouli (1942). Nirdosh was reviewed by The Times of India on 28 March 1942 under the title "Nalini Jaywant's Charming Portrayal In National's Attractive Film".
