= Neel Kamal (1947 film) =

- Theatrical release poster
- Directed by: Kidar Sharma
- Written by: Kidar Sharma
- Produced by: Kidar Sharma
- Starring: Begum Para; Raj Kapoor; Madhubala
- Cinematography: Gordhanbhai Patel
- Edited by: S. G. Chavande
- Music by: B. Vasudev
- Distributed by: Bombay Talkies
- Release date: 24 March 1947
- Running time: 116 min.
- Country: India
- Language: Hindi
- Box office: est. ₹2.5 million

Neel Kamal (lit. 'Blue Lotus') is a 1947 Indian Hindi-language drama film directed by Kidar Sharma and starring Begum Para, Madhubala and Raj Kapoor. The first film to feature Madhubala and Kapoor in leading roles, Neel Kamal follows two separated royal sisters (Para and Madhubala), whose mutual love for a self-absorbed artist (Kapoor) ultimately leads the younger sister to suicide.

The film earned ₹2.5 million at the box-office. It was not successful, according to director Kidar Sharma.

== Plot ==
Set in the royal court of Janakgarh, the film opens with the palace coup led by the villainous Mangal Singh against his sister's husband, the king of Janakgarh, Maharana Pragat Singh. The mortally wounded king escapes from the palace with his queen and their two daughters. They take shelter in a temple disguised as ordinary citizens. The elder princess ventures out on her horse disguised as a young boy to get help from her uncle, the king's brother Maharana Kharak Singh who rules another state. She succeeds in escaping treacherous attacks by Mangal Singh's men on her way. In the meanwhile Mangal Singh learns the whereabouts of the king. He goes to the temple and kills the king and the queen. His soldiers inform him that the two princesses were killed on their way to get help from their uncle. The younger princess Kamal who was present in the temple with her parents is a toddler and escapes the villainy of Mangal Singh by walking out of the temple alone. She is found by an "untouchable" man who brings her home and adopts her as his daughter despite his wife's objections. She is named Ganga. In the meanwhile, the older princess is helped by her uncle who raids Janakgarh, kills Mangal Singh and appoints the princess to rule the kingdom of Janakgarh until her father can be located.

One day while helping her father clean the city premises outside a temple, little Ganga, enters the inner chamber of the temple and incurs the priest's wrath for breaking the rule that untouchables can not enter temples. The childless couple leaves Janakgarh after running into trouble with the priest and raise Ganga in a nearby town while the older princess rules over Janakgarh. In their newly adopted town - Ganga's adoptive parents do not tell anyone about their social status of "untouchables" nor engage in their low caste work of public cleaning. They make a living by doing labor jobs. Ganga is cherished by her adoptive father but his wife remains negative towards her.

Teenager Ganga (Madhubala) meets and falls in love with Madhu Sudan (Raj Kapoor), a rich but skeptical artist from Janakgarh who is in town to carve stone artifacts in a temple. Having lost his parents, he lives in a mansion in Janakgarh with guru ji, his mentor, spiritual guide and the teacher who taught him sculpting. While working, Madhu Sudan slips and falls down from the upper level of his work site one day. Ganga and her father bring him home and the family looks after him until he recovers from his injuries. Ganga's simplicity and doting love both worry and overwhelm Madhu Sudan who tells her "the harder I close the doors of my heart, the louder you knock .." However, he allows her to follow him to Janakagarh along with her parents since he feels obligated to help the family for their hospitality. He employs the family as laborers in his art workshop in Janakgarh.

The princess ruling Janakgarh appoints Madhu Sudan to make stone artifacts for the palace including her own image in stone. Soon, she develops a liking for the rakish artist as well. Realizing that Madhu Sudan is spending most of his time in the palace, Ganga goes to the palace with her friend, dressed as a princess and tells Madhu Sudan to explain his work to her. Madhu Sudan reprimands her for the childish prank. However, he does explain that his artifacts depict life and death. Life as a ruthless, cruel and double faced creature and death as a loving and beautiful mother. Ganga listens to him, feeling enchanted while Madhu Sudan's mentor, the guru ji watches in amusement. Just then, the princess arrives at the scene and sees Ganga impersonating her. Feeling indignant she orders that both girls be arrested and whipped. Madhu Sudan implores with the princess but Ganga and her friend are lashed before they are able to leave the prison.

Soon, the princess begins to express her views and her love to a fascinated Madhu Sudan. As he begins to warm up to the princess, Madhu Sudan's mentor warns him that Ganga's innocent love represents the soul, the creativity; whereas the princess's love represents the common and mundane desire/passion which will ultimately scuffle his creativity. Pleased and gratified with his spiritual mentor's counsel, Madhu Sudan Ganga that he will soon have his guide talk to her father and that they will then get engaged. He promises her that he will take her to the temple to fulfill her cherished desire of going inside the temple, which Ganga had expressed in the past, only to be forbidden by her father to do so. When Ganga's adoptive mother hears that Madhu Sudan is ready to marry Ganga, she reprimands Ganga for being selfish. She reveals to her that they are "untouchables" and that Ganga's lineage was unknown - which would make it impossible for her to marry an upper caste Madhu Sudan. Heart broken by the revelation that she could never marry her love, Ganga quietly goes to the pond, jumps into it and dies while her mother watches from a distance. In the meanwhile, Madhu Sudan brushes aside the princess's objections to his decision to choose Ganga over her. Enraged, the princess breaks the artifacts built by him. Madhu Sudan remains undeterred and leaves the palace. Ganga is found to be missing and Madhu Sudan, Ganga's father and some other men frantically look for her. They call out her name by the pond.

A maid tells a distraught princess that her little sister has been found. She gets up and quickly goes to meet her sister but soon returns saying angrily that those people were lying and trying to deceive her to gain wealth and that her little sister Kamal had a special circular mark/formation on the palm of her right hand. This was not known to anyone until this time. Since Ganga had such a mark on her right hand the rumor goes around that Ganga was the younger princess. The Princess announces a large reward for whoever will find Ganga. Ganga's mother brings her dead body out of the pond and asks the princess to give her the reward. The princess cries in deep remorse.

A few days later a blue lotus (neel kamal) is seen growing in the pond at the spot where Ganga's body was found. Madhu Sudan sees this. Surprised, he exclaims that a rare and his favorite variety of lotus has suddenly grown in the pond that never had lotus flowers growing in it. He wanted lotus flowers to grow in the pond and had even tried to install a blue lotus flower carved from stone in the pond one day while Ganga- princess Kamal watched him. His mentor had talked him out of the idea of installing stone flower/s in the pond. Madhu Sudan feels that Ganga has fulfilled his heart's wish by taking the form of the beautiful blue lotus flower in the pond. To honor and reciprocate her love, he decides to fulfill Ganga's wish of going into the temple with him - He carries the blue lotus flower into the temple and offers it to the gods. Putting his skepticism aside Madhu Sudan humbly says to the god that he never thought he would have to come to his temple for such a tragic reason. Madhu Sudan then lays the beautiful flower at the feet of the god.

== Cast ==
- Begum Para as Princess
- Raj Kapoor as Madhusudan
- Madhubala as Ganga (credited as "Mumtaz")
- Nazira
- Rajendra as Rajindar
- Nafis Khalili
- Shanta Kumari as Shanta Kumar
- Baby Indira
- Subhashini as Subhashani
- Dalip Kumar
- Kumar Sahu

== Production ==
The production of Neel Kamal began in 1946 under Ranjit Studios. The film was initially titled Bichara Bhagwaan and featured actors Jairaj and Kamla Chatterjee in major roles. The latter, who was also director Kidar Sharma's wife, died unexpectedly midway the filming, leading a devastated Sharma to shelve the production infinitely.

Months after the incident, Sharma restarted the production in Chatterjee's memory and cast a 14 year-old Madhubala, a child actress popularly known as "Baby Mumtaz", as the leading lady. Madhubala, who had earlier collaborated a few times with Sharma, already remembered most of the lines of her offered role and was never absent from work, which impressed the director highly. Following Jairaj's withdrawal, Sharma employed his clapper-boy Raj Kapoor to play Madhu Sudan—his first lead role in a film.

When Sharma announced the cast publicly, it evoked immense criticism from the industry; furthermore, the financiers were apprehensive of the film's potential at the box-office for it did not feature any established star of the time. To compensate their losses, an adamant Sharma sold his plot and financed Neel Kamal himself. Madhubala was given the star-billing as "Mumtaz". Neel Kamal was her last film before she assumed her screen name on the suggestion of actress Devika Rani.

== Soundtrack ==
The soundtrack of Neel Kamal was composed by Snehal Bhatkar (credited as B. Vasudev) and lyrics were written by Kidar Sharma.

Soundtracks
No.	Title	Singer(s)	Length
1.	"Aankh Jo Dekhe Hai"	Mukesh	3:32
2.	"Jaiyo Na Bides"	Rajkumari Dubey, Snehal Bhatkar	4:13
3.	"Patthar Se Tum Doodh Bahai"	Mukesh, Zohrabai Ambalewali	3:25
4.	"Pyar Se Humko"	Mukesh, Zohrabai Ambalewali	2:52
5.	"Sochta Hai Kya"	Mukesh	2:49
6.	"Bol Bol Balam Bedardi"	Rajkumari, Geeta Dutt	3:45
7.	"Kal Jamuna Tat Par"	Rajkumari	3:06
8.	"Bhool Jate Hain"	Rajkumari	3:53
9.	"Brij Mein Dhool Macha"	Geeta Dutt, Rajkumari, Snehal Bhatkar	2:16
10.	"Jawaani Agar Huk"	Rajkumari, Geeta Dutt	2:46
11.	"Maa Ne Bheja"	Rajkumari, Geeta Dutt	4:11

== Release ==
The film opened at Lamington Theatre, Bombay, on 9 August 1947.

== Reception ==
=== Critical reception ===
A Times of India review, published on 15 August 1947, praised the film's "fine photography".

=== Box office ===
Neel Kamal earned about ₹2.5 million (₹25 lakhs) at the box office in its initial theatrical run. According to Hindustan Times, it was a commercial failure. In the words of Sharma, the film "did not achieve much success."
