= Hulchul (1951 film) =

1951 film

- Directed by: Shubh Karan Ojha
- Written by: Hasrat Jaipuri
- Based on: Wuthering Heights by Emily Brontë
- Produced by: K. Asif
- Starring: Dilip Kumar; Nargis
- Cinematography: V. N. Reddy
- Edited by: Vithal Banker
- Music by: Sajjad Hussain; Mohammed Shafi Nagri Niyazi
- Production company: National Theatres
- Distributed by: Hindi Film Exchange
- Release date: 2 February 1951
- Country: India
- Language: Hindi

Hulchul (lit. Commotion) is a 1951 Indian Hindi-language drama film directed by Shubh Karan Ojha and written by Hasrat Jaipuri. The film was produced by K. Asif with Sajjad Hussain and Mohammed Shafi Nagri Niyazi (separately) as music directors and film song lyrics by Khumar Barabankvi.

This film stars Dilip Kumar, Nargis along with K. N. Singh, Balraj Sahni, Jeevan and Yakub. It is a loose adaptation of Emily Brontë's 1847 novel Wuthering Heights.

== Cast ==
- Dilip Kumar as Kishore (based on Heathcliff)
- Nargis as Asha (based on Catherine Earnshaw)
- K. N. Singh as Chandan, Asha's brother (based on Hindley Earnshaw)
- Balraj Sahni as Jailor
- Jeevan as Paul
- Yakub as Nand
- Murad as Thakur Ajit Singh
- Sitara Devi as Neelam
- Cuckoo
- Neelam as Malti
- Parikshit Sahni as young Kishore
- Anwari as young Asha
- N. Kabir as young Chandan

== Soundtrack ==
Sajjad Hussain was brought in as the music director of this film. He, however, left the film after composing 3 songs due to a financial dispute with the film's producer K. Asif. Mohammed Shafi Nagri Niyazi was brought on board to compose the remaining 6 songs. The lyrics for all the songs were written by Khumar Barabankvi.

Song	Singer(s)	Music Director
"Koi Kis Tarah Raaz-E-Ulfat Chhupaye..."	Rajkumari Dubey	Sajjad Hussain
"Aaj Mere Naseeb Ne Mujhko Rula Rula Diya..."	Lata Mangeshkar	Sajjad Hussain
"Bahaar Aayi, Lutaa Dil Meraa Haay Aabaad Ho Kar..."	Lata Mangeshkar	Sajjad Hussain
"Ek Jhoothi Si Tasalli Woh Mujhe De Ke Chale..."	Lata Mangeshkar	Mohammed Shafi Nagri Niyazi
"Haaye Sadke Tere O Baanke Mere..."	Lata Mangeshkar	Mohammed Shafi Nagri Niyazi
"So Rahe Hain Bekhabar Sonewale Gaaon Mein..."	Shamshad Begum	Mohammed Shafi Nagri Niyazi
"Kismet Ke Sitaare Doob Gaye, Ummeed Ka Tara Koi Nahin..."	Mohammed Rafi & Lata Mangeshkar	Mohammed Shafi Nagri Niyazi
"O Bichhade Hue Saathi Jiyoon Kaise Bataa De..."	Mohammed Rafi & Lata Mangeshkar	Mohammed Shafi Nagri Niyazi
"Preet Jata Ke Meet Bana Ke, Bhool Na Jaana..."	Mohammed Rafi & Lata Mangeshkar	Mohammed Shafi Nagri Niyazi

== Trivia ==
- The film opened with a self-deprecatory message from its makers, stating "Respectfully & affectionately this picture is dedicated to those dear friends, comrades and well-wishers who had implicit faith in us... never to complete the picture". The phrase "never to complete this picture" appeared on the screen after a delay following the rest of the message was displayed.
- In 1949, producer K. Asif had taken Balraj Sahni to Bombay's Arthur Road Jail to help him prepare for his role as a jailor in this film. The jailor present there showed Sahni around the jail to show him how the prisoners dwelled. As fate would have it, Sahni was soon arrested participating in a Communist Party procession and was detained in Bareilly Jail. After being imprisoned there for two months, he was shifted to the same Arthur Road Jail he had visited with Asif. Sahni was lodged in this jail while the film was being shot and Asif had to obtain the police's permission to allow Sahni to visit the studio to shoot his scenes. This was mentioned by Sahni in his autobiography. In his own words, "The day I had to report for the shooting, all the inmates would become animated. It was as if everyone had suddenly got film fever! I then used to be flooded with all manner of requests. Someone wanted a bottle of scented hair oil, or a tin of tooth powder; a film-fan wanted me to get him a photograph of Nargis & Dilip Kumar; or I might be asked to procure a packet of tea, or a particular brand of bidis or cigarettes. I would then arrive at the studio carrying in my pocket a long list of all these odds & ends. K. Asif would hand it over to his assistant & by evening, the 'cargo' would be delivered at the studio for me to carry it back to the jail."
- Parikshit Sahni debuted as a child artist with this film. He played the child version of Dilip Kumar's character Kishore and was credited as Junior Balraj after his father Balraj Sahni who, himself was acting in this film. The senior Sahni permitted his son to act in the film on the condition that he would not accept any fee for it. The same year, Parikshit Sahni also acted as a child artist in the film Deedar (1951), before resuming his focus on education. Interestingly, there too, he played the child version of Dilip Kumar's character Shyamu. His first film as an adult was Anokhi Raat (1968).
