= Monica Desai =

Indian actress

- Citizenship: India
- Occupation: Actress
- Years active: 1940–1948
- Spouse: Phani Majumdar
- Relatives: Leela Desai (sister)

Monica Desai was an Indian actress. She was married to Phani Majumdar.

== Filmography ==
- Vikram Shashikala (1948)
- Ajit (1948)
- Chanda Ki Chandni (1948)
- Chittor Vijay (1947)
- Devdasi (1945)
- Bhanwara
- Gauri (1943)
- Chitralekha (1941)
- Nimai Sanyasi (1940)
