= Paristan (film) =

- Directed by: Mahesh Kaul
- Produced by: Acharya Arts
- Starring: Pahari Sanyal; Anjali Devi
- Music by: Ninu Majumdar
- Release date: 1944
- Country: British India
- Language: Hindi

Paristan (lit. 'Paristan'; transl. Land of Fairies) is a 1944 Indian Hindi-language fantasy film. The film was directed by Mahesh Kaul for Acharya Art productions. It starred Pahari Sanyal, Anjali Devi, Kamal Zamindar, Sunalini Devi, Moni Chatterjee and Padma Bannerjee. The music was composed by Ninu Majumdar and the lyrics were by Roopdas and Ninu Majumdar. This was Mahesh Kaul's second film after Angoori (1943).

== Cast ==
- Pahari Sanyal
- Anjali Devi
- Kamal Zamindar
- Sunalini Devi
- Moni Chatterjee
- Padma Bannerjee
- Ranjit Kumari
- Anwaribai

== Soundtrack ==
The film had ten songs with music composed by Ninu Majumdar and the lyrics written by Majumdar and Roopdas. The soundtrack label was Columbia Records.

=== Song list ===
- "Kholo Kholi Koi Dil Ki Khidki"
- "O Saiyan Dekhi Tori Shaan"
- "Bheeshan Hatya Kaand Kaho"
- "Ae Re Balam Duhai"
- "Nindiya Ri More Lalna Ki"
- "Hanso Hanso Aur Khoob Hanso"
- "Phool Uthi Band Kali"
- "Chayi Bahaar Sakhi"
- "Ek Akal Ki Baat"
- "Pal Bhar Ki Pehchaan"
