= Paristan =

Home of parīs in Persian cosmology

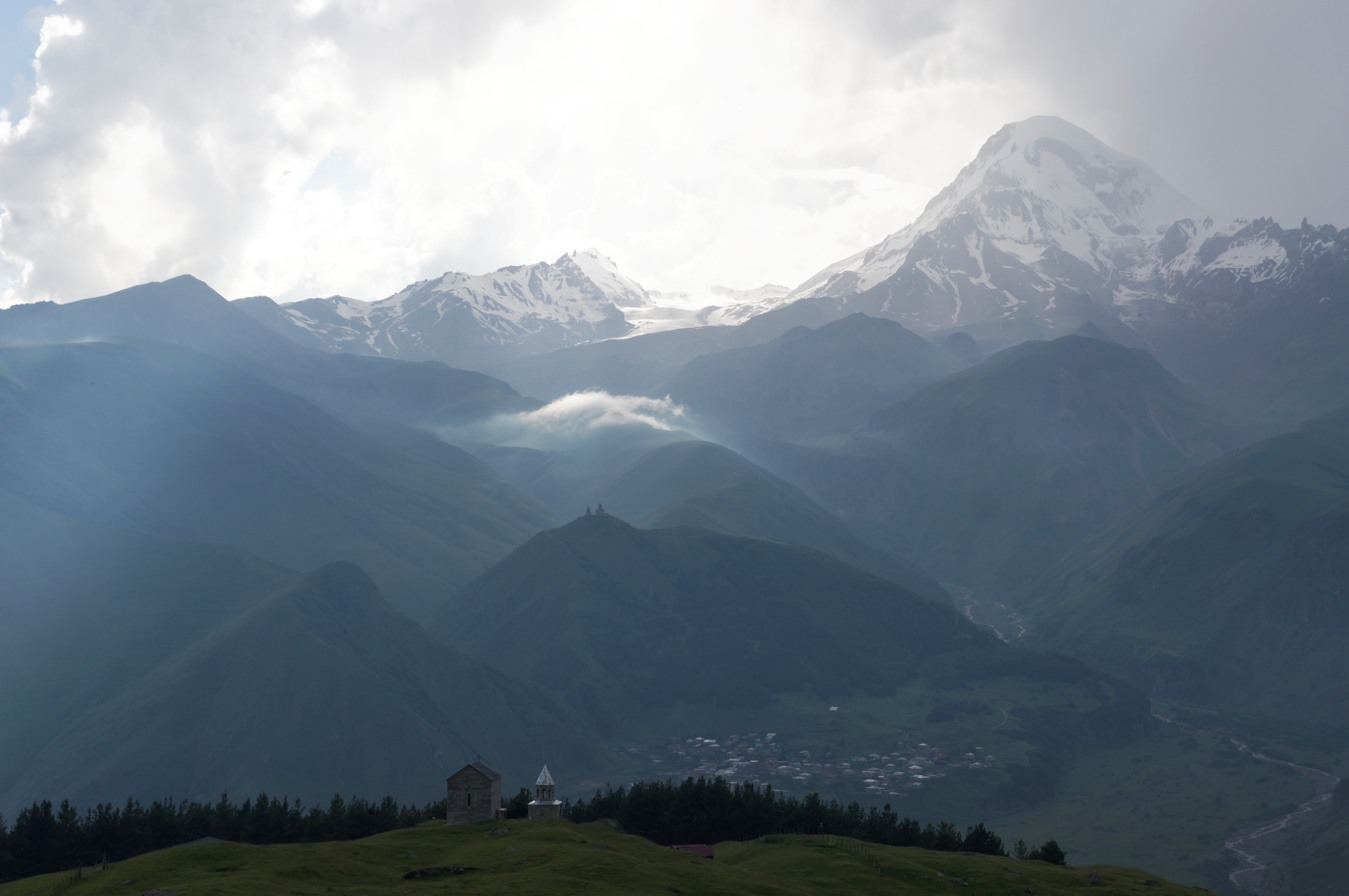
The Caucasus Mountains, traditional location of Paristan

In Persian cosmology, Paristan (Persian: پریستان, romanized: Parīstān, lit. 'land of the parīs') is the home of parīs, which are supernatural beings originating from Persian and wider Asian folklore that are described as winged creatures of immense beauty, usually associated with the legendary Mount Qaf (also Koh-e Qaf or Qafkuh).

== Muslim folklore ==
Although originating in pre-Islamic Persian literature, parīs and Paristan were adopted in the wider West Asian folklore and, through the spread of Islamic culture eastward, in the Muslim mythology of Central and South Asia. With parīs being identified as benevolent (often female) jinn in early Quran translations into Persian, Paristan became what can be fairly compared with the fairyland/elfame of European folklore.

== Mount Qaf ==
The alternative name Koh-e Qaf or Qafkuh "Mount Qaf" was used by Persians both as the name of a legendary mountain and for the "strange" and unknown territory of the Caucasus Mountains which marked the extent of their knowledge and influence.

== See also ==
- Kafiristan
- Fairy
