= Pandit Indra Chandra =

Indian lyricist

Pandit Indra Chandra was an Indian lyricist of Hindi language films from the 1930s through the 1950s. He wrote lyrics for 913 songs in 132 films, including Mr. Sampat (1952) and Bahut Din Huwe (1954).

== Filmography ==
- Gunsundari (1948)
- Mr. Sampat (1952)
- Bahut Din Huwe (1954)
