= Kidar Sharma =

Indian film director, producer, screenwriter and lyricist

- Born: Kidar Nath Sharma; 12 April 1910; Narowal, Punjab, British India (now Punjab, Pakistan)
- Died: 29 April 1999 (aged 89); Mumbai, Maharashtra, India
- Occupations: Director; screenwriter; actor; producer; lyricist
- Years active: 1935–1998
- Spouse(s): Raj Dulari Kamla Chatterjee (m. 1944; died 1946)

Kidar Nath Sharma (12 April 1910 – 29 April 1999), also known as Kedar Sharma, was an Indian film director, producer, screenwriter, and lyricist of Hindi films.

While he had great success as a director of movies including Neel Kamal (1947), Bawre Nain (1950) and Jogan (1950), he is most remembered for starting the acting careers of popular Bollywood actors like Madhubala, Geeta Bali, Raj Kapoor, Mala Sinha, Bharat Bhushan and Tanuja.

== Early life and education ==
Kidar Sharma was born in a Punjabi Brahmin family in Narowal in what was then the Punjab region of India and grew up in a life of poverty. Two brothers, Ragunath and Vishwa had died as infants and his sister, Taro, died of Tuberculosis at an early age. A younger sister Guro survived as did a younger brother, Himmat Rai Sharma, who would later work with Kidar on films before establishing himself as a successful Urdu poet. Kidar attended the Baij Nath High School in Amritsar where he became interested in philosophy, poetry, painting and photography. Upon completion of high school, he ran away from home to pursue a career in cinema in Mumbai but was unsuccessful in gaining employment. He returned to Amritsar and attended the Hindu Sabha College where he founded a College Dramatic Society which would later give him his first break in film.

== Career ==
The head of a local Temperance movement would attend one of Kidar's plays and hired him to produce a silent film depicting the evils of alcohol. Using the money he earned from this project, he would receive his master's degree in English at Khalsa College, Amritsar before joining a local theatre group that earned him limited acting success in 1931. He was married in 1932 and painted to earn income. Upon seeing an early talkies film Puran Bhagat (1933) by film director Debaki Bose, he left for Calcutta hoping to get his big break at New Theatres Studios, where Debaki Bose worked. After many months of unemployment he managed to meet a then-unknown actor of New Theatres, Prithviraj Kapoor (where he would meet Prithviraj's eight-year-old son for the first time, Raj Kapoor). Prithviraj Kapoor introduced Kidar to his neighbour, then-unknown Kundan Lal Saigal, who through an acquaintance allowed Kidar to meet Debaki Bose. Debaki Bose hired Kidar initially to become the Movie stills photographer for the film Seeta (1934) but would give Kidar his first part in the creation of film with that of a backdrop screen painter and a poster painter for the film Inquilab (1935) where Kidar also had a bit part. Kidar would continue to work with New Theatres on films such as Dhoop Chhaon (1935) and Pujarin (1936) but a big break would come when Kidar was asked to write the dialogue and lyrics for the 1936 adaptation of Devdas starring his friend Kundan Lal Saigal. Devdas was not only a hit, but songs from the film such as Balam Aaye Baso Moray Man Mein and Dukh Ke Ab Din Beetat Naahi became feverishly popular throughout the country, giving Kidar Sharma acclaim by the press and public. Kidar would later say, "Both Bimal Roy and I got our first big break in Devdas. He as the cameraman and I as the writer."

Kidar's big directing break came in 1940 when asked to complete the film Tumhari Jeet. Upon its completion he was given the opportunity to direct his own screenplay for Aulad / Dil Hi to Hai, which met with some success. He was then asked to direct Chitralekha (1941) which became a smash hit and gave Kidar credibility as a director. He would go on to begin producing his own movies, casting Raj Kapoor and Madhubala in their first film Neel Kamal. He would also cast Geeta Bali in her first movie, Sohag Raat (1948) and later he would team her with Raj Kapoor for the film Bawre Nain (1950). That same year he directed Jogan starring Nargis and Dilip Kumar. In the late 1950s Jawaharlal Nehru who had heard Sharma's lyrics, summoned him and asked him to become director-in-chief of the Children's Film Society. Kidar Sharma would work on many movies for the Children's Film Society, including the film Jaldeep which would go on to receive international acclaim. In 1958, he would work for one year directing movies in Singapore for Shaw Brothers Studio.

== Personal life ==
Sharma's second wife was Bengali actress Kamla Chatterjee, whom he met on the sets of Vish Kanya (1943). They married in 1944. She died in January 1946.

== Death and legacy ==
An outstanding poet, Sharma wrote some of the most memorable songs including Balam aayo baso more man mein, Dukh kay ab din beetat nahi, Khayalon Mein Kisike Iss Tarah Aaya Nahin Karte (Bawre Nain), Kabhi Tanhaiyon Mein Yuun Hamari Yaad Aaeygi (Hamari Yaad Aayegi) and Teri duniya mein dil lagta nahi. Kidar would continue to contribute as a lyricist and to write and direct films through the 1990s. Ironically, many Indian film critics and historians argued that he deserved the highest cinema award from the government of India but he died on 29 April 1999 in Mumbai a day before he was to receive the Raj Kapoor Award, named in honour of the actor he helped make a success.

His autobiography, The One and Lonely Kidar Sharma was published posthumously in 2002, edited by his son Vikram Sharma.

== Awards and nominations ==
=== International honours and recognitions ===
- Part of the Indian Delegation in 1945 which travelled to England and Hollywood and met with Charlie Chaplin, Walt Disney and Cecil B. DeMille.
- Best Children's Film, International Film Festival at Venice 1957 for Jaldeep

=== National honours and recognitions ===
- 1956: National Film Award for Best Children's Film: Jaldeep
- Indian Film Directors' Association Lifetime Achievement Award
- Gold Award from Prime Minister Indira Gandhi in 1982 for contribution to Indian Cinema
- Government of Maharashtra's Raj Kapoor Award (awarded in 1999 after his death)

== Filmography ==
Year	Title	Director	Writer	Lyricist	Actor	Misc
1935	Inquilab				Yes	Set Painter
1935	Dhoop Chhaon				Yes	Assistant Manager
1936	Pujarin				Yes	
1936	Karodpati a.k.a. Millionaire			Yes	Yes	
1936	Devdas		Yes	Yes		Dialogue
1937	Vidyapati				Yes	
1937	Anath Ashram		Yes			
1939	Jawani Ki Reet		Yes			Dialogue
1939	Badi Didi		Yes		Yes	
1939	Tumhai Jeet				Yes	(film directed by Ranjit Sen).
1939	Dil Hi Toh Hai	Yes			Yes	
1940	Zindagi		Yes			
1940	Aulad	Yes				
1941	Chitralekha	Yes				
1942	Armaan	Yes				
1942	Gauri	Yes				
1944	Mumtaz Mahal	Yes				
1945	Dhanna Bhagat	Yes				
1945	Chand Chakori	Yes				
1946	Duniya Ek Sarai	Yes				
1947	Neel Kamal	Yes	Yes			Producer
1948	Suhaag Raat	Yes				
1949	Neki Aur Badi	Yes			Yes	
1949	Thes	Yes				
1950	Bawre Nain	Yes	Yes			Producer
1950	Jogan	Yes				
1951	Shokhiyan	Yes		Yes		Producer
1952	Sapna	Yes				
1953	Gunah	Yes				
1954	Chora-Chori	Yes				
1956	Rangeen Raaten	Yes			Yes	Producer
1956	Jaldeep (Light House)	Yes	Yes			CFSI Film
1957	Ganga Ki Lahren	Yes	Yes			CFSI Film
1957	Bachchon Se Bate (Talking To Children)	Yes	Yes			CFSI Film
1958	Haria		Yes			CFSI Film
1958	Gulab Ka Phool (The Rose Among Flowers)	Yes	Yes			CFSI Film
1959	26 January (India's Republic Day)	Yes	Yes			CFSI Film
1959	Ekta (In Unison)	Yes	Yes			CFSI Film
1959	Guru Bhakti (Devotion)		Yes			CFSI Film
1959	Panchtantra Ki Ek Kahani (A Story From The Panchantra)		Yes			CFSI Film
1959	Yatra (Journey)		Yes			CFSI Film
1960	Dilli Ki Kahani (The Story of Delhi City)		Yes			CFSI Film
1960	Chetak	Yes	Yes			CFSI Film
1960	Meera Ka Chitra (Portrait of Meera)	Yes	Yes			CFSI Film
1960	Nyaya (Justice)					CFSI Film, Camera
1961	Hamari Yaad Aayegi	Yes			Yes	
1961	Mahateerth (Great Pilgrimage)	Yes	Yes			CFSI Film
1964	Fariyad	Yes				
1964	Chitralekha	Yes	Yes			
1965	Kaajal	Yes	Yes			
1981	Pehla Kadam	Yes				
1983	Khuda Hafiz (Goodbye)	Yes	Yes	Yes		CFSI Film

== Children's Film Society of India Contributions ==
- Jaldeep (Light House) (1956), writer, director
- Ganga Ki Lahren (1957), writer, director
- Bachchon Se Bate (Talking To Children) (1957), writer, director
- Haria (1958), writer
- Gulab Ka Phool (The Rose Among Flowers) (1958), writer, director
- 26 January (India's Republic Day) (1959), writer, director
- Ekta (In Unison) (1959), writer, director
- Guru Bhakti (Devotion) (1959), writer
- Panchtantra Ki Ek Kahani (A Story From The Panchantra) (1959), writer
- Yatra (Journey) (1959), writer
- Dilli Ki Kahani (The Story of Delhi City) (1960), writer
- Chetak (1960), writer, director
- Meera Ka Chitra (Portrait of Meera) (1960), writer, director
- Nyaya (Justice) (1960), Camera
- Mahateerth (Great Pilgrimage) (1961), writer, director
- Aise Log Bhi Hote Hain Telefilm
- Khuda Hafiz (Goodbye) (1983), writer, director, lyricist

== Bibliography ==
- The One and Lonely Kidar Sharma (an anecdotal autobiography), ed. Vikram Sharma. Bluejay Books, 2002. ISBN 8187075961.
