= List of Hindi films of 1950 =

An overview of films produced by the Bollywood film industry based in Mumbai in 1950:

== Highest-grossing films ==
The ten highest-grossing films at the Indian box office in 1950:

Rank	Title	Gross collection
1	Samadhi	₹1.35 crore
2	Babul	₹1.25 crore
3	Dastan	₹1.15 crore
4	Jogan	₹1.12 crore
5	Har Har Mahadev	₹1.10 crore
6	Sangram	₹1 crore
7	Beqasoor	₹90 lakh
8	Sargam	₹85 lakh
9	Arzoo	₹80 lakh
10	Aankhen	₹72 lakh

== A-D ==
Title	Director	Cast	Genre	Notes/Music
Aadhi Raat	S.K. Ojha	Ashok Kumar, Nargis, Kuldip Kaur, Cukoo, Jeevan, Neeaalam, Tiwari	Social Drama	Singers: Geeta Dutt, Meena Kapoor, Lata Mangeshkar, Mohammed Rafi. Music: Husnlal Bhagatram, Hansraj Behl Lyrics: Sarshar Sailani, Rajendra Krishan, Asad Bhopali
Aahuti	Kulbhushan	Mumtaz Shanti, Shyama, Sapru, Ranjit, Kumari, Kesari, Cuckoo	Social	Music: D. C. Dutta Lyrics: Indeevar, Tandon
Aankhen	Devendra Goel	Bharat Bhushan, Nalini Jaywant, Yakub, Shekhar, Jeevan, Yashodhara Katju	Family Drama	Music: Madan Mohan Lyrics: Raja Mehdi Ali Khan, Bharat Vyas, Saraswati Kumar Deepak
Achchaji	S. H. Tharani	Bhagwan, Leela Gupte, Cuckoo, Baburao, Naaz, Usha Shukla, Habib	Action Comedy	Music: S. B. Pathak Lyrics:
Aflatoon	Jaswant Jhaveri	Bhagwan, Usha, Lila Gupta, Baburao Pendharkar, Vasantrao Pehalwan	Action	Music: Ninu Mujumdar Lyrics: Indeevar, Buniyaad
Afsar	Chetan Anand	Dev Anand, Suraiya, Rashid Khan, Zohra Sehgal, Manmohan Krishan, Kanhaiya Lal, Ruma Devi	Romantic comedy	Music: S. D. Burman Lyrics: Narendra Sharma, Vishwamitra Adil Playback: Suraiya
Alakh Niranjan	Gunjal	Nirupa Roy, Trilok Kapoor, Durga Khote, Sapru, Aroon, Ulhas	Devotional	Music: Premnath Lyrics: Manohar Khanna
Anmol Ratan	M. Sadiq	Meena Kumari, Karan Dewan, Madan Puri, Gope, Nirmala	Romance Drama	Music: Vinod Lyrics: D. N. Madhok
Arzoo	Shaheed Latif	Dilip Kumar, Kamini Kaushal, Shashikala, Gope, Cuckoo, Sita Bose	Romantic Drama	Music: Anil Biswas Lyrics: Majrooh Sultanpuri
Babooji	Bhagwan	Bhagwan, Munawwar Sultana, Leela Gupte, Amar, A. Shah, Jankidas	Action	Music: P. Ramakant Lyrics: Ehsan Rizvi
Babul	S. U. Sunny	Dilip Kumar, Nargis, Munawwar Sultana, Tun Tun, Amar, A. Shah, Jankidas	Drama	Music: Naushad Lyrics: Shakeel Badayuni
Bahurani	S. M. Yusuf	Shekhar, Sulochana Chatteree, Kaushalya, Amar, Gope, Lalita Pawar, David, Yashodhara Katju, N. A. Ansari	Family Drama	Music: Hansraj Behl Lyrics: Bharat Vyas, Shewan Rizvi
Bakhshish	Brij Mohan, A. Jadhav	Bhagwan, Leela Gupte, Usha Shukla, Baburao, Inamdar	Action	Music: P. Ramakant Lyrics: Ehsan Rizvi
Banwra	G. Rakesh	Raj Kapoor, Nimmi, Lalita Pawar, Hiralal, Lalita Pawar, K. N. Singh, Rattan Kumar, Sunder	Social	Music: Krishna Dayal Lyrics: Gafil Harnalvi, Amar N. Khanna
Basera	Inayat	Ramola, Hiralal, Veena Kumari, Roop Mala, Chanda, Bhudo Advani	Social	Music: M. A. Rauf Lyrics: Sardar Ilham
Bawre Nain	Kidar Sharma	Raj Kapoor, Geeta Bali, Cuckoo, Vijayalaxmi, Jaswant, Pesi Patel, Majnu, Nazira	Romance	Music: Roshan Lyrics: Kidar Sharma
Bebus		Bharat Bhushan, Purnima, Chandrashekhar, Cuckoo, W. M. Khan	Social	Music: Ganpat Rai Lyrics: Jalal Malihabadi, Salik Lakhnavi
Beqasoor	K. Amarnath	Madhubala, Ajit, Yakub, Pramila, Geeta Nizami, Durga Khote, Gope	Family Drama	Music: Anil Biswas Music: Ehsan Rizvi, Arzoo Lakhnavi
Bhagwan Shri Krishna	Raja Yagnik	Shahu Modak, Usha Kiran, Sulochana Chatterjiee, David, Ishwarlal, Niranjan Sharma	Religious	Music: Shankar Rao Vyas Lyrics: Pandit Phani
Bhai Bahen	Ram Darayani	Geeta Bali, Bharat Bhushan, Nirupa Roy, Prem Abid, Gope, Jeevan, Gulab, Cuckoo	Family Drama	Music: Shyam Sundar Lyrics: Raja Mehdi Ali Khan, I. C. Kapoor
Bhishma Pratigya	Vasant Painter	Nargis, Shahu Modak, Mahipal, Purnima, Kumar, Nimbalkar	Mythology	Music: S. K. Pal Lyrics: Manohar Khanna
Birha Ki Raat	Gajanan Jagirdar	Dev Anand, Nargis, Om Prakash, Snehprabha, Jagirdar, Madan Puri	Romantic Drama	Music: Husnlal Bhagatram Lyrics: Sarshar Sailani
Biwi	Kishore Sharma	Mumtaz Shanti, Veena, Ramlal, Al Nasir, Pran	Drama	Music: Aziz Hindi Lyrics: Nazim Panipati, Wali Sahab
Chhoti Bhabhi	Shanti Kumar	Nargis, Shyama, Karan Dewan, Yakub, Suraiya Choudhary, Johar, Tabassum	Family Drama	Music: Husnlal Bhagatram Lyrics: Qamar Jalalabadi
Chor	A. P. Kapoor	Meera Misra, Krishnakant, Cuckoo, Sankatha, Sona Chatterjee	Crime Action	Music: Gobind Ram Lyrics: Rammurti Chaturvedi, Bharat Vyas, Harish Bhardwaj
Circuswale	Balwant Bhatt	Fearless Nadia, John Cawas, Dalpat, Narmada Shanker, Sona Chatterjee	Action	Music: Chitragupta Lyrics: Shyam Hindi
Dahej	V. Shantaram	Prithviraj Kapoor, Karan Dewan, Jayshree, Murad, Lalita Pawar, Ulhas, Mumtaz Begum	Social Drama	Music: Vasant Desai Lyrics: Shams Lakhnavi
Dastan	A. R. Kardar	Raj Kapoor, Suraiya, Veena, Al Nasir, Murad, Suresh, Pratima Devi, S. N. Banerjee	Romantic Melodrama	Music by Naushad Lyrics: Shakeel Badayuni
Dilruba	Dwarka Khosla	Dev Anand, Rehana, Yakub, Achala Sachdev, Cuckoo, Balam	Social	Music: Gyan Dutt Lyrics: Rajendra Krishan, S. H. Bihari, Neelkanth Tiwari
Dolti Naiya	Mirza Musharaf	Nigar Sultana, Amarnath, Shyama, Dulari, Veena, Mukri, Bhudo Advani, Mirza Musharaf	Social	Music: Ram Prasad Lyrics: Jalal Malihabadi, Prakash, Bahaar Ajmeri

== E-L ==
Title	Director	Cast	Genre	Notes/Music
Gauna	Amiya Chakravarty	Usha Kiran, Anoop Kumar, Purnima, S. Nazir, Kesari, Wasti	Family Drama	Music: Husnlal Bhagatram; Lyrics: Qamar Jalalabadi
Gulnar	Harbans	Geeta Bali, Salim Raza, Cuckoo, Farida, Kamal	Action	Music: Hansraj Behl, Ghulam Haider; Lyrics: Qatil Shifai, Tufail Hoshiyarpuri, Ehsan Rizvi, Mulk Raj Anand
Hamara Ghar	Nanabhai Bhatt	Meena Kumari, Umakant, Agha, Jankidas, Yashodhara Katju, Durga Khote, Ramesh Gupta, David	Family Drama	Music: Chitragupta; Lyrics: Bharat Vyas, Rammurti Chaturvedi, Anjum
Hamari Beti	Shobhana Samarth	Shekhar, Nutan, Motilal, Shobhana Samarth, Tanuja, Agha, Pramila, David, K. N. Singh, Veera	Family	Music: Snehal Bhatkar; Lyrics: Pandit Phani, Randhir Sahityalankar
Hanste Aansoo	K. B. Lal	Madhubala, Motilal, Gope, Manorama, Mirza Musharaf, Jankidas	Social	Music: Ghulam Mohammed; Lyrics: Majrooh Sultanpuri
Hanste Rehna	Mohammed Hussain	Mukri, Mumtaz, Arvind Kumar, Habib, Heera Sawant	Action	Producer: Rajan Pictures; Music: Wadhwa; Lyrics: Faruk Kaiser
Har Har Mahadev	Jayant Desai	Trilok Kapoor, Nirupa Roy, Durga Khote, Jeevan, Niranjan Sharma, Shanta Kunwar	Religious	Music: Avinash Vyas; Lyrics: Ramesh Shastri, Saraswati Kumar Deepak
Hindustan Hamara	Paul Zils	Prithviraj Kapoor, Dev Anand, Nalini Jaywant, Durga Khote, Premnath, P. Jairaj, David, Ulhas, Wasti, K. N. Singh	Social	Music: Vasant Desai; Lyrics: Allama Iqbal, S. R. Saaj, Deewan Sharar
Jalte Deep	Deepak Asha	Nimmi, Amarnath, Deepak, Leela Mishra, Randhir	Social	Music: Sardul Kwatra; Lyrics: M.A. Taj, Nazim Panipati, Aziz Kashmiri (1)
Jan Pahchan	Fali Mistry	Raj Kapoor, Nargis, Shyama, Jeevan, Mukri, Dulari, Amar, Sankatha	Romantic Drama	Music: Khemchand Prakash; Lyrics: Shakeel Badayuni
Janmashtami	Nanabhai Bhatt	Bharat Bhushan, Shobhana Samarth, Kanta Kumari, Jeevan, Raj Kumar, Amirbai Karnataki	Devotional	Music: S. B. Pathak; Lyrics: Bharat Vyas
Jodidar	Balwant Bhatt	Bhagwan, Malti, Shyam Sunder, Kanta Kumari, Chand	Action	Music: Chitragupta; Lyrics: Shyam Hindi, Anjum
Jogan	Kidar Nath Sharma	Dilip Kumar, Nargis, Purnima, Tabassum, Rajendra Kumar, Manju, Ramesh Thakur, Darpan, Pesi Patel	Social Drama	Music: Bulo C. Rani; Lyrics: Kidar Sharma
Kamal Ke Phool	D.D. Kashyap	Suraiya, Amarnath, Shakuntala, Raj Mehra, Badri Prasad, Leela Mishra, Jeevan, Niranjan Sharma	Social	Music: Shyam Sunder; Lyrics: Rajendra Krishan
Khamosh Sipahi	Ram Kamlani	Nigar Sultana, Gope, Sohan, David	Action	Music: Hansraj Behl; Lyrics: D. N. Madhok
Khel	S. M. Nawab	Dev Anand, Nargis, Nigar Sultana, Murad, Neelam, Anwar Hussain	Social Drama	Music: Sajjad Hussain; Lyrics: Jan Nisar Akhtar, Khawar Zaman, Sagar Nizami, Zia Sarhadi
Khiladi	R. C. Talwar	Ashok Kumar, Suraiya, Kumar, Indu, Aloke, E. Tarapore, Narmada Shankar, Sunder	Action Romance	Music: Hansraj Behl; Lyrics: Naqshab, Rajendra Krishan
Kisi Ki Yaad	Chaturbhuj Doshi	Bharat Bhushan, Veena, Sulochana Chatterjee, Paro Devi, Jeevan, Badri Prasad, Mumtaz	Drama	Music: Hansraj Behl; Lyrics: Qamar Jalalabadi, Varma, Tahir Lakhnavi
Lajawab	Jagatrai Pesumal Advani	Sohan, Rehana, Kuldip Kaur, Randhir, Iftekhar, Pran	Social	Music: Anil Biswas; Lyrics: Prem Dhawan, Shekhar, Safdar Aah
Lavangi	Y. V. Rao	Rukmini, Shanta Devi, Ramesh Tiwari, R. P. Misra, Leela Bai, Maya Bose	Historical	Music: Bulo C. Rani; Lyrics: Saraswati Kumar Deepak

== M-P ==
Title	Director	Cast	Genre	Notes/Music
Madhubala	Prahlad Dutt	Dev Anand, Madhubala, Jeevan, Ramesh Thakur, Randhir, Ram Avtar, Manju	Romantic melodrama	Music: Lachhiram; Lyrics: Rajendra Krishan, I. C. Kapoor
Magroor	R. D. Mathur	Meena Kumari, P. Jairaj, Rehman, Nigar Sultana, Durga Khote, Mirza Musharraf, Jilloo	Romance Drama	Music: Sajjad Hussain; Lyrics: Raja Mehdi Ali Khan, Zia Sindhi, Mullaji
Man Ka Meet	Ratilal Punatkar	Nirupa Roy, Manhar Desai, Dulari, Shanti Madhok, Sarita Devi	Social	Music: Sardul Kwatra; Lyrics: D. N. Madhok, Sarshar Sailani
Mashaal	Nitin Bose	Ashok Kumar, Sumitra Devi (actress), Ruma Devi, S. Nasir, Kanu Roy, Arun Kumar, Cuckoo, Nana Palsikar	Social	Music: S. D. Burman; Lyrics: Kavi Pradeep
Meena Bazaar	Ravindra Dave	Shyam, Nargis, Kuldip Kaur, Om Prakash, Gope, Sapru, Chandabai		Music: Husnlal Bhagatram; Lyrics: Qamar Jalalabadi
Meharbani	K. Amarnath	Ajit, Begum Para, Yakub, Gope, Cuckoo, Indu Pal, Shanta Pawar	Social Drama	Music: Hafiz Khan; Lyrics: Khumar Barabankvi, Anjum Jaipuri, Khawar Zaman
Meri Asha	Dr. Alam	Agha, Murad, Shanta Kanwar, Nihal, Radha	Social	Music: K. Narayan Rao
Muqaddar	Arvind Sen	Nalini Jaywant, Sajjan, Kishore Kumar, Radhakrishan, Krishnakant, Iftekhar, Sofia, Samson	Social	Music: Khemchand Prakash; Lyrics: Bharat Vyas, Raj Shekhar, Raja Mehdi Ali Khan
Nai Bhabhi	S. D. Narang	Amarnath, Smriti Biswas, Sunder, Cuckoo, Kaushalya, Maya Devi	Family Drama	Music: Harbaksh Singh; Lyrics: Charan Das, B. M. Sharma
Nili	Ratibhai Punatar	Dev Anand, Suraiya, Shyama, Agha, Dulari, Cuckoo	Romance Drama	Music: S. Mohinder; Lyrics: Surjit Sethi
Nirala	Shanker Mukerji	Dev Anand, Madhubala, Yakub, Radhakrishan, Mumtaz Ali, Leela Mishra, Narmada Shankar	Social	Music: C.Ramchandra; Lyrics: Pyarelal Santoshi
Nirdosh	Najam Naqvi	Shyam, Rehana, Kuldip Kaur, K. N. Singh, Om Prakash, Mukri, S. L. Puri, Mishra, S. M. Abbas	Social	Music: Shyam Sundar; Raja Mehdi Ali Khan, Asad Bhopali, S. H. Bihari
Nishana	Wajahat Mirza	Ashok Kumar, Madhubala, Shyama, Geeta Bali, Yakub, Durga Khote, K. N. Singh, S. M. Abbas, Mukri, Balam, Cuckoo, Kanhaiyalal	Social Drama	Music: Khurshid Anwar; Nakshab Jarchvi
Pagle	Protima Das Gupta	Gajanan Jagirdar, Begam Para, Agha, Krishna Kumar, Cuckoo, David, Pratima Devi, Mubarak	Social	Music: V. G. Bhatkar; Lyrics: Behzad Lakhnavi, Kabil Amritsari, Anjum Rehmani
Pardes	M. Sadiq	Madhubala, Rehman, Karan Dewan, Surendra, Jayant, Cuckoo, Mukri, Shakuntala, Jagdish Sethi, Chanchal	Social Family Drama	Music by Ghulam Mohammed; Lyrics: Shakeel Badayuni
Pehla Aadmi	Bimal Roy	Smriti Biswas, Pahari Sanyal, Paul Mahendra, Jahar Roy, Hiralal, Asit Sen	Social	Music: R. C. Boral; Lyrics: Prakash
Putli	Wali	Mumtaz Shanti, Yakub, Pran, Husn Banu, Cuckoo	Social	Music: Aziz Hindi; Lyrics: Wali Sahab
Pyar	V. M. Vyas	Raj Kapoor, Nargis, Shyama, Yakub, Nawab, W. M. Khan, Kesari, Kumar	Romance Drama	Music: S. D. Burman; Lyrics: Rajendra Krishan
Pyaar Ki Manzil	Keki Mistry	Rehman, Munawwar Sultana, Gope, Jankidas, Kamal, Pratima Devi	Social	Music: Husnlal Bhagatram; Lyrics: Shewan Rizvi, Rajendra Krishan

== R-Z ==
Title	Director	Cast	Genre	Notes/Music
Raj Mukut	Nanubhai Vakil	P. Jairaj, Nimmi, Veena, Sapru, Baby Tabassum, Ram Singh	Costume Action	Music: Gobindram; Lyrics: Bharat Vyas
Raj Rani	Satish Nigam	Rehman, Usha Kiran, Meena, Shashikala, Sohan, Cuckoo	Social	Music: Hansraj Behl; Lyrics: D. N. Madhok
Ram Darshan	Ramesh Gupta	Bharat Bhushan, Mridula Rani, Shashi Kapoor, Sheela Naik	Religious	Music: Shanker Rao Vyas; Lyrics: Ramesh Gupta
Rangila Musafir	A. Karim	Bhagwan, Usha Shukla, Babu Rao, Leela Pawar, Shanta Patel	Action	Music: Manohar; Lyrics: A. Karim
Rupaiya	G. P. Pawar	Om Prakash, Shashikala, Manmohan, Baby Naaz, Anwaribai, Mirajkar, Kamalkant	Social	Music: P. Ramakant; Lyrics: Indeevar
Sabak	M. Sadiq	Karan Dewan, Munawwar Sultana, Shyama, Om Prakash, Kumar, Gajanan Jagirdar, Jilloo	Social	Music: A. R. Qureshi; Lyrics: D. N. Madhok
Sachcha Pyaar	Niranjan	Majnu, Kanta Kumari, Rajan Haksar, Manorama, Cuckoo	Social	Music: Harbans Lal; Lyrics: Satyapal Sharma
Samadhi	Ramesh Saigal	Ashok Kumar, Nalini Jaywant, Kuldip Kaur, Mubarak, David, Sandhya, Shashi Kapoor, Shyam	Social Patriotic	Music: C. Ramchandra; Lyrics: Rajendra Krishan
Sangeeta	Ramanlal Desai	Shyam, Suraiya, Nigar Sultana, Radhakrishan, Mumtaz Ali, Pran	Romance Drama	Music: C. Ramchandra; Lyrics: Pyarelal Santoshi
Sangram	Gyan Mukerjee	Ashok Kumar, Nalini Jaywant, Sajjan, Tiwari, Nawab, Samson, Baby Tabassum	Social Drama	Music: C. Ramchandra; Lyrics: Raja Mehdi Ali Khan, Vrajendra Gaur
Sargam	P. L. Santoshi	Raj Kapoor, Rehana, Om Prakash, Mumtaz Ali, Vijayalaxmi, Radhakrishan, Paro Devi, Rattan Kumar, Chandabai, David, Tabassum	Musical	Music: C.Ramchandra; Lyrics: Pyarelal Santoshi
Sartaj	S. Khalil	Motilal, Munawwar Sultana, Shyama, Ansari, Manorama, Mirza Musharraf	Drama	Music: Husnlal Bhagatram; Lyrics: Majrooh Sultanpuri, Shewan Rizvi
Sati Narmada	Ishwarlal	Ishwarlal, Sulochana Chatterjee, Jeevan, Umakant, Salvi, Babu Raje	Devotional	Music: Khemchand Prakash; Lyrics: Neelkanth Tiwari, Pandit Phani
Shaan	Jayant Desai	Suraiya, Rehman, David, Sapru, Manorama, Cuckoo, Amar, Pratima Devi	Social	Music: Hansraj Behl; Lyrics: Rajendra Krishan, Kaif Irfani
Shadi Ki Raat	Yashwant Pethkar	Geeta Bali, Rehman, Vijaylaxmi, Arun Kumar, Leela Mishra, Jankidas, Ansari, Shanta Kunwar	Drama	Music: Gobind Ram; Lyrics: Sarshar Sailani
Sheesh Mahal	Sohrab Modi	Sohrab Modi, Naseem Banu, Amarnath, Nigar Sultana, Pran, Mubarak, Leela Mishra, A. Shah	Family Drama	Music: Vasant Desai; Lyrics: Shams Lakhnavi, Nazim Panipati
Shri Ganesh Mahima	Homi Wadia	Mahipal, Meena Kumari, Amarnath, Mulchand, S. N. Tripathi, Dalpat	Devotional	Music: S. N. Tripathi; Lyrics: Ramesh Pandey
Shri Krishna Darshan	A. R. Sheikh	Usha Kiran, Anant Marathe, Durga Khote, Shakuntala	Devotional	Music: Sudhir Phadke; Lyrics: Narendra Sharma
Shri Ram Avtar	W. Garcher	Shahu Modak, Amarnath, Ratanmala, Asha Rani, Leela Mishra	Religious	Music: Indravadan Bhatt; Lyrics: Pandit Shivraj
Surajmukhi	O. P. Dutta	Shyam, Rehana, Gope, Mukri, Durga Khote, Yashodhara Katju, Randhir, Cuckoo	Social	Music: Husnlal Bhagatram; Lyrics: Rajendra Krishan
Veer Babruwahan	Danabhai Bhatt	Amarnath, Mridula, S. N. Tripathi, Shashi Kapoor, Umakant, Jankidas, B. M. Vyas	Mythological	Music: Chitragupta; Lyrics: Anjum Jaipuri
Veer Bhimsen	Jayant Desai	Trilok Kapoor, Nirupa Roy, Durga Khote, Ram Singh, Umakant, Vasantrao Pehalwan, Shakuntala	Mythological	Music: Avinash Vyas; Lyrics: B. P. Bhargav, Saraswati Kumar Deepak
Wafa	J. P. Advani	Karan Dewan, Nimmi, Yakub, Gope, I. S. Johar, Gulab, Shyam, Bipin Gupta	Romantic Drama	Music: Vinod, Bulo C. Rani; Lyrics: Hasrat Jaipuri, D. N. Madhok, Aziz Kashmiri
