= List of Hindi films of 1948 =

A list of films produced by the Bollywood film industry based in Mumbai in 1948:

== Highest-grossing films ==
The seven highest-grossing films at the Indian box office in 1948:

Rank	Title	Nett collection
1	Shaheed	₹75 lakh
2	Chandralekha	₹70 lakh
3	Pyar Ki Jeet	₹60 lakh
4	Mela	₹55 lakh
5	Ziddi	₹50 lakh
6	Nadiya Ke Paar	₹40 lakh
7	Suhaag Raat	₹38 lakh

== A-B ==
Title	Director	Cast	Genre	Notes
11 O'Clock	Homi Wadia	Fearless Nadia, John Cawas, Atish Sayani, Aftab, Shyam Sunder	Action	Music: Chitragupta; Lyrics: Rajjan
Aag	Raj Kapoor	Raj Kapoor, Nargis, Premnath, Nigar Sultana, Kamini Kaushal, B. M. Vyas	Romantic Drama	Music: Ram Ganguly; Lyrics: Behzad Lakhnavi, Majrooh Sultanpuri, Saraswati Kumar Deepak
Aaj Ka Farhad	Balwant Joshi	Nainkant, Nargis, Arvind Kumar, Leela Gupte, Zohra, Kesari	Action	Music: Khan Mastana, Raj Ram; Lyrics: Chabi Kumar Mast, Y.N. Joshi
Aaj Ki Raat	D.D. Kashyap	Motilal, Suraiya, Yakub, Shah Nawaz, Leela Mishra, Anita Sharma, Raj Mehra, Sangeeta	Social	Music: Husnlal Bhagatram; Lyrics: Rajendra Krishan
Aap Beeti	Kumar	Pramila, Agha, Kumar, Khurshid, E. Bilimoria	Social	Music: Haribhai Mistry; Lyrics: Hasrat Lakhnavi, Gopal Singh Nepali
Actress	Najam Naqvi	Rehana, Prem Adib, Meena Shorey, David, Mukri, Jamal Amrohi	Romance Social	Music: Shyam Sunder; Lyrics: Nakhshab Jarchvi, Pyarelal Santoshi, Raja Mehdi Ali Khan
Adalat	Vasant Joglekar	Jog Madgulkar, Sudha Apte, Saroj Borkar, Baburao Pendharkar, Shalini Devi	Social	Music: Datta Devjekar; Lyrics: Narendra Sharma, Mahipal
Ajamil	J. Kapadia	Manhar Desai, Suresh, Kanta Kumari, Malti, Umakant, Shanta Kumari, Narmada Shanker	Costume	Music: Master Mohan Junior; Lyrics: Prabhulal Dwivedi
Ajit	Mohan Bhavnani	Prem Nath, Monica Desai, Yashodhra Katju, Gope, Ram Kamlani, Badri Prasad	Costume	Music: Gobind Ram; Lyrics:
Amar Prem	N.M. Kelkar	Raj Kapoor, Madhubala, Madhav Kale, Alka Rani, Nimbalkar	Romance Drama	Music: Dutt Thakur; Lyrics: Mohan Mishra
Andhon Ka Sahara	V. Thungare	Leela Gupte, Vijay Kumar, Inamdar, Surve, Kamladevi	Social	Music: S. Parsekar; Lyrics: Kesharinath Vaidya
Anjangarh	Bimal Roy	Sunanda Banerjee, Hiralal, Bipin Gupta, Ajay Kumar, Asit Sen, Parulkar, Manorama, Tulsi Chakraborty		Music: R. C. Boral; Lyrics: Ramesh Pandey, Pandit Bhushan
Anjuman	Akhtar Hussain	P. Jairaj, Nargis, Anwar Hussain, Neelam, Durga Khote, Chandabai	Social	Music: Bulo C. Rani; Lyrics: Majrooh Sultanpuri
Anokhi Ada	Mehboob Khan	Naseem Banu, Surendra, Prem Adib, Zeb Qureshi, Cuckoo, Bhudo Advani, Murad	Drama Romance Musical	Music: Naushad; Lyrics: Shakeel Badayuni
Anokha Pyar	M.I. Dharamsey	Dilip Kumar, Nargis, Nalini Jaywant, Mukri, Uma Dutt, Habib, Sheikh, Sankatha Prasad	Romance Drama	Music: Anil Biswas; Lyrics: Shams Azimabadi, Zia Sarhadi, Behzad Lakhnavi
Asha	L. Meghani	Sohan, Urvashi, Shanta Kanwar, Samson, Shivraj, Tiwari	Social	Music: Khemchand Prakash; Lyrics: L. Meghani
Azad Hindustan	Nanubhai Vakil	Suraiya Choudhary, Prakash, Shamim, Mayaram, Kamlarani, Anwari	Social	Music: A. R. Qureshi; Lyrics: Pandit Anuj
Azadi Ki Raah Par	Lalit Chandra Mehta	P. Jairaj, Prithviraj Kapoor, Vanmala, Sunalini Devi, Jagdish Sethi, Narmada Shanker, Misra	Social	Music: G. D. Kapoor; Lyrics: Sahir Ludhianvi, Shyam Lal Gupta (1)
Bahadur Jeevan	Tara Harish	Harishchandra, Latika, Manju, Gope, Dalpat, Hamid, E. Bilimoria	Action	Music: Nandram Omkar; Lyrics: Munshi Shyam
Bahadur Naresh	K. L. Kahan	Anant Prabhu, Krishna Kumar, Rajrani, Ravi	Action	Music: K. Narayan Rao; Lyrics: Fida
Balma	Harbans Singh	Madhuri, Veena, Ramesh Thakur, Baburao, Kesari, Ramlal, Mirajkar	Social	Music: S. D. Batish; Lyrics: Roopbani
Banjare	Hiren Bose	Jeevan Lal, Baby Deepanjan, Kamal Misra, Banasree Malavika, Pramod Chandra	Social	Music: Anupam Ghatak; Lyrics: Zaakir Hussain
Banwasi	Kumar Chandrasekhar	Mahipal, Shobha Rani, Sushanta, Gulab, Ameena, Gyani, Nana Madgulkar	Costume	Music: Ram Ganguly; Lyrics: Narendra Sharma
Barsat Ki Ek Raat	G. Singh	Amarnath, Asha Posley, Pran, G. N. Dutt, Shehzadi, Begum Parvin, Lata	Social	Music: Ghulam Haider; Lyrics: D. N. Madhok, Shaukat Tanvi, Mulkraj Bhakri
Bhakta Bilwamangal	Shanti Kumar	Anant Marathe, Shashi Kapoor, Kanta Kumari, Ved Prakash, Laxman, Amirbai Karnataki, Pande	Devotional	Music: Shanker Rao Vyas; Lyrics: Raghunath Brahmbhatt
Bhakta Gopalbhaiya	Shanti Kumar	Anant Marathe, Shashi Kapoor, Kanta Kumari, Ved Prakash, Laxman, Amirbai Karnataki	Devotional	Music: Shanker Rao Vyas; Lyrics: Ramesh Gupta
Bhool	V. Avdhoot	Keshavrao Date, Dewan Sharar, Rajshree, Suman, Shiv Dayal, Umesh Sharma, Parshuram	Social Drama	Music: Purushottam; Lyrics: Firoz Jalandhari
Bichchade Balam	Manibhai Vyas	Khurshid, Anjum, Meena Kumari, A.R. Ojha, Mohammed Farooqui, Mohantara Talpade, Savitri Gidwani, Nihal Sharma, Nafiz Khalil, Anjum	Family Melodrama	Music: Bulo C. Rani; Lyrics: Pandit Indra
Bihari	K. D. Ketkar, A. R. Zamindar	Surekha, Shabnam, Nandrekar, H. Prakash, Nimbalkar, Samson	Social	Music: Naresh Bhattacharya and Ramkirshna Shinde; Lyrics: Kashyap, Hakeem Ashraf, Kumar Sharma and Munshi Farog
Birhan	K. Bhandari	Pran, Begum Parvin, Roopa, Shanti Madhok, Cuckoo	Social	Music: Lachhiram Tamar; Lyrics: Bekal, Sarshar Sailani

== C-H ==
Title	Director	Cast	Genre	Notes
Chand Sitare	I.C. Kapoor	Jeevan, Manorama, Anita, Satish, Leela, Rajan Haksar, Niranjan Sharma	Social	Music: Premnath; Lyrics: I. C. Kapoor
Chanda Ki Chandni	Dwarka Khosla	P. Jairaj, Rehana, Moni Chatterjee, Ajit, Amir Bano	Social	Music: Gyan Dutt; Lyrics: D. N. Madhok
Chandralekha	S.S. Vasan	T. R. Rajakumari, M. K. Radha, Ranjan, Yashodhara Katju, Sundari Bai, L. Narayan Rao	Costume Drama	Music: S. Rajeswara Rao; Lyrics: Pandit Indra, Bharat Vyas
Chandrashekhar	Debaki Bose	Ashok Kumar, Kanan Devi, Bharti Devi, Chhabi Biswas, Sunder	Costume Drama	Music: Kamal Das Gupta; Lyrics: Pandit Madhur
Chhup Chhup Ke	Baij Sharma, K. C. Sharma	Nirmala Devi, Shanti Kumar, Zarina, Suraj Bakshi, Nafeez Begum	Social	Music: S. D. Batish; Lyrics: Tufail Hoshiyarpuri, Walker Pandey
Chunaria	Ravindra Dave	Wasti, Pran, Manorama, Randhir, Sofia, Ramesh, Chand Burke, Sarita, Baij Sharma	Social	Music: Hansraj Behl; Lyrics: Mulkraj Bhakri
Desh Seva	Nanubhai Vakil	Suraiya Choudhary, Prakash, Srinivas, Rafiq, N. A. Ansari, Shamim, Mumtaz, Anwari	Social	Music: A. R. Qureshi; Lyrics: Pandit Anuj
Dhanwale	Ramanlal Desai	Hansa Wadkar	Social Drama	Music: Indravadan Bhatt; Lyrics: Shivraj Ilahabadi
Dhanyawad	Gajanan Jagirdar	Hansa Wadkar, Jagirdar, Sajjan, Lalita Pawar, Leela Mishra, Agha, Bikram Kapoor, Dixit, Madhav Kale, Sankatha Prasad	Social	Music: A. R. Qureshi; Lyrics: Sajjan
Didi	Mukund Masurekar	Ranjana, Cuckoo, Pande, Charubala, Anand, Ghanshyam, Shobharani, Amrit Shah	Family	Music: Mukund Masurekar; Lyrics: Indeevar, Saraswati Kumar Deepak
Diler Detective	Mohammed Hussain	Arvind Kumar, Meherunnisa, Shanti Madhok, Mohammed Shafi, Habib, Ranibala, Manchi Thuthi	Action	Music: K. Narayan Rao; Lyrics: Shewan Rizvi
Dil Ki Awaz	Krishnachander	Radhika, Tiwari, Sarita Devi, Mohindarnath, Raj Mehra	Social	Music: D. C. Dutta; Lyrics: Vishwamitra Adil
Dilwale	Ramanlal Desai	Firoza, Yashwant Dave, Husn Ara, Sudha Rao, Kesari	Social	Music: Indravadan Bhatt; Lyrics: Baba Alam Siahposh
Do Kaliyan	Raja Paranjpe	Chandrakant Gokhale, Shalini, Saroj Borkar, Vinay Kale	Social	Music: Pandit Shanker; Lyrics: I. B. Tabassum Mohiyabadi, Izhar Malihabadi
Dukhiyari	D. K. Ratan Mandir	Trilok Kapoor, Meena, Chandra Mohan, Ranjit Kumar, Vinayak, Majnu, Bhudo Advani, Chand Burke, Cuckoo	Social Drama	Music: Gyan Dutt; Lyrics: F. M. Kaiser
Duniyadari	K. P. Sahani, K. Advani	Ghori, Radha, S. Baburao, Sophia, Sultana, Mumtaz	Action	Music: Motinath; Lyrics: Panna Kapoor, Waheed Qureshi
Ek Aurat	S. D. Narang	Smriti Biswas, Geetasree, Ridku, Kavish, Pushpa, Sunder, S. D. Narang, Hiralal	Social	Music: Gopen Mullick; Lyrics: B. N. Sharma
Gaibi Talwar	A. M. Khan	Husn Ara, Anil Kumar, Leela Pande	Action	Music: Alla Rakha (A. R. Qureshi); Lyrics: Roopbani
Gajre	R.D. Mathur	Motilal, Suraiya, Geeta Nizami, Agha, Murad	Romance Drama	Music: Anil Biswas; Lyrics: Gopal Singh Nepali
Ghar Ki Izzat	Ram Daryani	Dilip Kumar, Mumtaz Shanti, Jeevan, Gope, Manorama, Dixit, Gulab Suleman	Social Family Drama	Music: Gobind Ram; Lyrics: I. C. Kapoor
Gopinath	Mahesh Kaul	Latika, Raj Kapoor, Tripti Mitra, Baby Zubeida, Sachin Ghosh	Romantic Drama Triangle	Music: Ninu Majumdar; Lyrics: Ram Murthy Chaturvedi, Meera Bai (2), Sur (2)
Grihasthi	S.M. Yusuf	Sulochana Chatterjee, Shyama, Masood, Yakub, Pran, Kuldip Kaur	Family Drama	Music: Ghulam Mohammed; Lyrics: Waheed Qureshi, Shakeel Badayuni
Gumrah				Music: Lyrics:
Gunjan	V.C. Desai	Trilok Kapoor, Nalini Jaywant, Balraj Sahni, Veena Kumari, Purnima, Narmada Shanker, David	Social	Music: Ashok Ghosh; Lyrics: S.R. Saaj, Brajendra Gaud
Gunsundari	Ratibhai Punatar	Nirupa Roy, Manhar Desai, Dulari, Nazira, Babu Raje, Jal Writer, Chhagan Romeo, Master Pransukh	Family Drama	Music: Bulo C. Rani, Avinash Vyas, Hansraj Behl; Lyrics: Indra Chandra
Heer Ranjha	Wali	Ghulam Mohammad, Mumtaz Shanti, Shree Nath, Roop Kamal, Gulab, Majnu	Legend Romance	Music: Aziz Khan, Sharmaji Varmaji; Lyrics: Amir Khusro, Wali Sahab
Hind Mail	Nanubhai Vakil	Prakash, Amir Karnataki, Bacha, N. A. Ansari	Action	Music: Alla Rakha (A. R. Qureshi); Lyrics: Roopbani
Hip Hip Hurray	Arvind Sen	Nirupa Roy, Balwant Singh, Navin Yagnik, Kumkum, Gulab, Bhudo Advani	Comedy	Music: Hanuman Prasad; Lyrics: Moti, Gopal Singh Nepali
Hum Bhi Insaan Hain	Phani Majumdar	Dev Anand, Ramola, Amir Bano, Niharika, Pal, G. Das		Music: H. P. Das; Lyrics: Gopal Singh Nepali

== I-M ==
Title	Director	Cast	Genre	Notes
Jadui Angoothi	A. M. Khan	Husn Ara, Anil Kumar, Devraj, Kesari	Fantasy	Music: Allarakha ( A. R. Qureshi); Lyrics: Roopbani
Jadui Bansari	Nanubhai Vakil	Prakash, Kamla Rani, Agha, Amirbai Karnataki	Action Fantasy	Music: D. Sharma; Lyrics: Roopbani
Jadui Chitra	Jaswant Jhaveri	Shanta Patel, Anil Kumar, Kesari, Leela Pande, N. A. Ansari, Bhim	Fantasy Action	Music: Damodar Sharma; Lyrics: Vishwanath Gupta
Jadui Shehnai	Naseem Siddiqui	Shanta Prasad, Prakash, N. A. Ansari, Leela Pande, Devraj, Rafique, Amirbai Karnataki	Action Fantasy	Music: Alla Rakha; Lyrics: Roopbani, Shewan Rizvi, Ejaz Vakeel
Jai Hanuman	Ramchandra Thakur	Nirupa Roy, P. Kailash, S. N. Tripathi, Pesi Patel, Ram Kumar, Babu Nene, Kamalakant, Inamdar	Religious	Music: Bulo C. Rani; Lyrics: Pandit Indra
Jai Hind	Ramnik Vaidya	Prakash, Shanta Patel, Bacha	Social	Music: Chitragupta; Lyrics: Shyam HIndi
Jalan	Bhagwan	Bhagwan, Chanchal, Usha Shukla, Baburao Pehalwan, Vasantrao Pehalwan	Action	Music: Annasaheb Mainkar; Lyrics: Ehsan Rizvi
Jalsa	Kamlakar	Geeta Bali, Ramesh, Purnima, Shyama, Raj Adib, Om Prakash, Tiwari, Vimla Bai	Drama	Music: Ram Ganguly; Lyrics: Ramesh Gupta
Jeene Do	A. F. Keeka, K. A. Majid	Leela Gupte, Panna Lal, Kaiser, Shanta Kunwar, Harish, Menka Devi	Social	Music: Shaukat Hussain Dehlvi (Nashad), D. V. Gadkar; Lyrics: Shewan Rizvi
Jharna	Protima Das Gupta	Begum Para, Maya Banerji, Shanti Madhok, Gope, Protima Das Gupta, Amir Bano, David	Social	Music: Gyan Dutt; Lyrics: Pandit Indra, Hasan Lateef
Jhoothi Kasmein	H. S. Rawail	Ramola, Hiralal, Rooplekha, Iftekhar, Robin Majumdar, Manorama, Sunder	Social	Music: G. A. Chisti; Lyrics: Jameel Mazhari, G. A. Chishti
Jungle Goddess	Nari Ghadiali	Fearless Nadia, John Cawas, Sheikh, Aftab, Putlibai, Manchi Tuthi	Action Adventure	Music: K. Narayan Rao; Lyrics: C. M. Hunar, Pandit Indra
Kajal	M. Sadiq	Suraiya, Jayant, Gope, Sharda, Ram Kamlani, Cuckoo, Wasti, Amir Bano	Social	Music: Ghulam Mohammed; Lyrics: Shakeel Badayuni, D. N. Madhok
Kalpana	Uday Shankar	Uday Shankar, Amala Uday Shankar, Lakshmi Kanta, Dr. G. V. Subba Rao, Birendra Bannerjee, Swaraj Mitter Gupta, Anil Kumar Chopra, Brijo Behari Banerji, Chiranjilal Shah, Devilal Samar, K. Mukerjee, Dulal Sen, G. V. Karandikar, Nagen Dey, Ganesh Banerji, Syd Jalaluddin, Farman Ali, Begam Zamarudh, Yousuf Ali, Lalitha, Krishnan Nair, Padmini, Krishna Namboodiri, Saraswathi, Neelakanta Sharma, Shakuntala, Popatlal Gupta, Suniti Kowshik, Narasing Rao, Jayalakshmi, Upendra Singh, Rani Bai, Ramakant Singh, Rajeswari, Chellappan, Yogam, Karunakaran Nair, Ramanamma, Narayan Kunju, Sudha Kowshik, Pandurangi, Leela, Raghavan, Usha, Vasudev Namboodiri, Lakshmi, Gopal Rao, Anasuya, Bhaskar Rao, Kamala, Vasan, Krishna Pillai, Rammoorthy, Narayan Panicker, Ramakrishna Kurup, Radhakrishna Nair, K. Raman Pillai, Shivasankara Nair, Raman Pillai, Keshav Namboodiri, Ajoy Chaliha, Shivaram Panicker, Deviprasad Ghatak, Raju, K. Bhaskar Pillai, Vittal Dass, Bhaskaran Pillai, Venkateswar Rao, Damodaran Pillai, Abdul Azeez, Kuttan Pillai, Amir Khan	Dance Drama	Music: Vishnudas Shirali; Lyrics: Sumitranandan Pant, Devi Lal Samar
Khidki	P. L. Santoshi	Rehana, Jawahar Kaul, V. H. Desai, Radhakrishan, Leela Mishra, Ram Singh, Mumtaz Ali, Tiwari	Social	Music: C. Ramchandra; Lyrics: Pyarelal Santoshi
Kiski Jeet	Safdar Mirza	Pushpa, Maqbul, Indu Kulkarni, Sadiq, Sarla, Mohammed Sandow	Social	Music: R. Shinde; Lyrics: Kumar Sharma
Kuchh Naya	Ninu Majumdar (Muzumdar)	Purnima, Ramesh, R. Sinha, R. S. Duba, Sudha Rao	Social	Music: Ninu Majumdar
Lakhpati	Ravindra Jaykar	Sulochana Chatterjee, Sapru, Rajan Haksar, Leela Chitnis, Om Prakash, Tabassum, Narmada Shanker	Social	Music: Husnlal Bhagatram; Lyrics: Qamar Jalalabadi
Lal Dupatta	K.B. Lall	Madhubala, Sapru, Ulhas, Rajan Haksar, Ranjit Kumari, Neelam, Kesari	Social Drama	Music: Gyan Dutt; Lyrics: Shams Lakhnavi, Manohar Khanna, D. N. Madhok
Lalach	Bhagwan	Bhagwan, Leela Gupte, Usha Shukla, Baburao Pehlwan	Action	Music: Anna Saheb; Lyrics: Ehsan Rizvi
Majboor	Nazir Ajmeri	Munawwar Sultana, Shyam Sohan, Indu Paul, Shivraj, Amir Bano	Family Melodrama	Music: Ghulam Haider; Lyrics:
Mala the Mighty	John Cawas	John Cawas, Leela, Bhagwan, Dalpat, Azim	Action	Music: Chitragupta; Lyrics: Shyam Hindi
Mandir	Dinkar D. Patil, Master Vinayak	Shahu Modak, Shanta Apte, Jaymala, Vijaya, Master Vinayak, Lata Mangeshkar, Baby Nanda, Jankidas, Samson	Social	Music: Vasant Desai; Lyrics: Narendra Sharma
Matlabi	Bhagwan	Bhagwan, Chanchal, Usha Shukla, Bibijan, Vasantrao Pehalwan, Baburao Pehalwan	Action	Music: Anna Saheb; Lyrics: Chabi Kumar Mast, Ehsan Rizvi
Mela	S.U. Sunny	Dilip Kumar, Nargis, Jayant, Jeevan, Rehman, Amar, Roop Kamal, Zubeida	Romantic Drama Social	Music: Naushad; Lyrics: Shakeel Badayuni
Mera Munna	Vishram Bedekar	Motilal, Nayantara, W. M. Khan, E. Tarapore, Leela Mishra, Ramesh Saigal	Family Drama	Music: C. Ramchandra; Lyrics: Qamar Jalalabadi
Mere Lal	Bal Gajbar	Hansa Wadkar, Jog, Chandrakant, Angre, Ram Upadhyay, Pratima Devi	Family	Music: Purushottam; Lyrics: Mahipal
Meri Kahani	Keki Mistry	Munawwar Sultana, Surendra, Murad, Bhudo Advani, Sanobar, Ramesh Sinha, Leela Kumari, Santosh Kumar	Romance Drama	Music: K. Dutta; Lyrics: Waheed Qureshi, Zia Sarhadi, Nakshab Jarchvi
Middle Fail	Kishore Sharma	Kiran, Shanti Madhok, Raj Kanwar, Ram Murti, Sankatha Prasad		Music: Hanuman Prasad; Lyrics: Gafil Harnalvi
Mitti Ke Khilone	Pralhad Dutt	Karan Dewan, Nirupa Roy, Nigar Sultana, Dulari, Ram Avtar, S. N. Tripathi	Social	Music: Bulo C. Rani; Lyrics: B. R. Sharma, Pandit Indra

== N-R ==
Title	Director	Cast	Genre	Notes
Nadiya Ke Paar	Kishore Sahu	Dilip Kumar, Kamini Kaushal, David, Maya Banerjee, S. L. Puri, Samson, Kanta Kumari	Social Drama	Music: C. Ramchandra; Lyrics: Moti
Nai Reet	S.K. Ojha	Geeta Bali, Sulochana Chatterjee, Krishnakant, Badri Prasad, Rajendra, Tiwari	Social	Music: S. K. Pal; Lyrics: Ratan Kumar Gupta, Bal Krishna Gupta
Nakli Heera	Ramanlal Desai	Basant Malini, Navinchandra, Shanta Kunwar, Moni Chatterjee	Action	Music: Saraswati Devi; Lyrics: Neelkanth Tiwari
Nao	D.N. Madhok	P. Jairaj, Nigar Sultana, Dulari, Krishna Kumari, Amir Bano, David, Badri Prasad	Social	Music: Gyan Dutt; Lyrics: D.N. Madhok
Nek Dil	S. R. Desai	Zubeida, Pran, Smriti Biswas, Amrit, Begum Parvin, Nazar	Social	Music: Asghar, Mohammed Hussain; Lyrics:
O Jane Wale	S. Sardesai	Trilok Kapoor, Geeta Desai, Umakant, Pandey, Mehar Sultana	Social	Music: Ali Hussain Muradabadi; Lyrics: Kaifi, Mustafa, S. Sardesai
Oonch Neech	Hemchander Chunder	Bharati Devi, Sumitra Devi, Chandrabati Devi, Paul Mahendra, Hiralal, N. A. Ansari	Social Romantic drama	Music: Pankaj Mullick; Lyrics: Ramesh Pandey
Padmini	Wali Saheb	Ashok Kumar Mumtaz Shanti, Mumtaz Ali, Maya Devi, A. Shah, Samson	Historical Drama	Music: Ghulam Haider; Lyrics: Wali Sahib
Papiha Re	Daud Chand	Amarnath, Khurshid, Akhtari, Asha Posle, Khairati, G. N. Butt, Mumtaz Begum	Social	Music: Dhaniram; Lyrics: Mulkraj Bhakri
Parai Aag	Najam Naqvi	Madhubala, Munawwar Sultana, Ulhas, W. M. Khan, Jilloo, Khalil	Social	Music: Lyrics: Tanveer Naqvi (5), Akhtar ul Iman (2)
Parbat Ki Rani	A. Karim	Shanta Patel, Dalpat, Habib, Leela Pawar, Sheri	Costume	Music: Master Ibrahim; Lyrics: A. Karim
Pardesi Mehmaan	Aspi Irani	Kamal Kapoor, Husn Banu, Bipin Gupta, Rajrani, Ghulam Mohammed, Afghan Sandow, Azim	Costume Drama	Music: Hansraj Behl; Lyrics: Indra Chandra
Paroo	Shorey Saulatalvi	Geeta Nizami, Dar Kashmiri, Randhir, Saroj Borkar	Social drama	Music: Rashid Atre; Lyrics: Nakshab Jarchavi, Santokh Nadeem
Patjhad	Ravindra Dave	Amarnath, Meena, Cuckoo, Om Prakash, Shamlal	Social	Music: S. D. Batish, Ghulam Haider; Lyrics: D. N. Madhok
Payal	A. Shakoor	Nihal, Agha, Cuckoo, Paro Devi, Altaf, Badri Prasad, Anwaribai, Abu Baker		Music: Shaukat Dehlvi Nashad; Lyrics: Vishwamitra Adil
Phool Aur Kaante	Achyut Govind Ranade	Lalita Pawar, Saroj Borkar, Master Rattan Kumar, Mohan Segal, Javdekar, Swaroop Saigal, Chaube	Social	Music: Dada Chandekar; Lyrics: Vishwamitra Adil
Pugree	Anant Thakur	Kamini Kaushal, Wasti, Shashikala, Amar, Gope, Dixit, Pratima Devi, Ram Avtar	Social Comedy Drama	Music: Ghulam Mohammed; Lyrics: Shakeel Badayuni
Pyaar Ki Jeet	O.P. Dutta	Suraiya, Rehman, Gope, Raj Mehra, Manorama, Leela Mishra, Yashodhara Katju, Niranjan Sharma	Social	Music: Husnlal Bhagatram; Lyrics: Qamar Jalalabadi, Rajendra Krishan
Raees	Qaisar Sabhai	Usha, Jawahar Kaul, Urvashi, Shanta Kunwar, Munshi Munakka	Social	Music: Manohar Arora; Lyrics: Qaisar Sabhai
Rambaan	Vijay Bhatt	Prem Adib, Shobhana Samarth, Chandra Mohan, Raj Adib, Umakant, Ramsingh, Leela Mishra, Jankidas	Religious	Music: Shanker Rao Vyas; Lyrics: Pandit Indra
Rang Mahal	Anand Kumar	Suraiya, Suresh, Shah Nawaz, Anant Kumar, Lalita Pawar, Anant Marathe	Fantasy, Drama	Music: K. Dutta; Lyrics: Shiv Kumar
Rangeen Zamana	M. Bhavnani	Premnath, Monica Desai, Gope Yashodhara Katju, Badri Prasad, Ram Kanlani	Social	Music: Gobind Ram; Lyrics: Pandit Phani
Ratan Manjari	Nanubhai Vakil	Prakash, Mumtaz, Anwaribai, Amirbai Karnataki, Gulnar	Costume	Music: Damodar Sharma; Lyrics: Roopbani, Muzaffar Lakhnavi
Refugee	Tara Harish	Sulochana Kadam, Ajit, Hamid, Majnu, Kesari, Urmila, Harishchandra, Dalpat	Social	Music: Ajit Merchant; Lyrics: Pandit Phani
Roop Rekha	Samar Ghosh	Rehman, Smriti Biswas, Asha Posley Veena Kohli, Pannalal, Ajmal	Social	Music: Ravi Roy Chowdhury; Lyrics: Preetam Ziyayi, Devraj Dinesh,
Rupaye Ki Kahani	Kumarsen Samarth	Bina Pal, Shashikala, Vasant Thegdi, Vimal Ghaisas, Krishnakant	Social	Music: Mohammed Aslam; Lyrics: Pandit Phani

== S-Z ==
Title	Director	Cast	Genre	Notes
Sabyasachi	Agradoot	Kamal Mitra, Paresh Banerjee, Meera Mishra, Sandhyarani, Bipin Gupta, Manorama		Music: Robin Chatterji; Lyrics: Zaheer Hussain
Sajan Ka Ghar	S. Daulatalavi	P. Jairaj, Ranjana, Kusum Deshpande, Vasant Thegdi, Uma Dutt	Social	Music: K. S. Sagar; Lyrics: Saraswati Kumar Deepak
Sant Tukaram	V. Damle, S. Fatehlal	V. Pagnis, Gouri, Madhu Apte, Nandrekar, K. Pandit	Biopic	Music: V. G. Bhatkar; Lyrics: Narendra Sharma
Sati Vijaya	K. J. Parmar	Ratnamala, Kishore Kumar, Kanta Kumari, Suryakant	Devotional	Music: Shantikumar Desai; Lyrics: Pandit Taresh
Satyanarayan	R. Vishnuram, Kumar Sahu	Leela Gupte, Jawahar Kaul, Ranjit Kumari, Roop Kumari, Balakram	Social	Music: Hansraj Behl; Lyrics: Surjit Sethi, Madhukar, Pandit Indra, Sevak
Satyavan Savitri	Manibhai Vyas	Nirupa Roy, Babu Raje, Maruti Rao, Bhim Pande, Bhagwandas, Kanta Kumari, Umakant	Mythology	Music: Indravadan Bhatt; Lyrics: Pandit Indra
Seeta Swayamwar	A. R. Sheikh	Durga Khote, Anant Marathe, Vasant Thegdi, Shakuntala, Balakram	Religious	Music: Sudhir Phadke; Lyrics: Amar Verma
Sehra	D. B. Joshi	Arun Kumar Ahuja, Maya Devi, Nirmala, S. Nazir, Sheikh, Leela Mishra	Social	Music: S. Mohinder; Lyrics:
Shaheed	Ramesh Saigal	Dilip Kumar, Kamini Kaushal, Chandra Mohan, Prabhu Dayal, Leela Chitnis	Social Patriotic	Music: Ghulam Haider; Lyrics: Qamar Jalalabadi
Shahnaz	S. Hassan	Begum Para, Altaf, Shanta Patel, Shyama, Sheikh, Gulzar		Music: Amirbai Karnataki; Lyrics: Dukhi Premnagri, Ameer Usmani Deobandi
Shakti	S.I. Hassan	Karan Dewan, Suraiya, Murad, Maya Devi, Seeta Bose, Cuckoo, Mumtaz Ali	Social	Music: Lyrics: Asad Jafri
Shauhar	Veena Kumari	Ulhas, Veena Kumari, Bhudo Advani, Dulari, Sankatha Prasad	Social Drama	Music: Masood; Lyrics: Sadiq Ali Khan, Arzoo Lakhnavi
Shikayat	Shaheed Latif	Shyam, Nigar Sultana, Rama Shukla, Agha, Baby Shakuntala, Sunalini Devi, Raj Mehra, Snehprabha	Social	Music: Rashid Atre; Lyrics: Ibrahim Khan Momin
Shri Ram Bhakta Hanuman	Homi Wadia	Trilok Kapoor, Sona Chatterjee, Amarnath, S. N. Tripathi, P. C. Joshi, Niranjan Sharma, Dalpat	Devotional	Music: S. N. Tripathi; Lyrics: Homi Wadia
Sipahi Ka Sapna a.k.a. Soldier's Dream	Sushil Majumdar			Music: Captain Ram Singh; Singers: I.N.A. Orchestra; Lyrics:
Sona	Mazhar Khan	Munawwar Sultana, Mazhar Khan, Madhuri, Dixit, Navin Yagnik, Madan Puri	Social	Music: Vasant Desai; Lyrics: Majrooh Sultanpuri, Nakhshab Jarchvi
Suhaag Raat a.k.a. Sohag Raat	Kidar Sharma	Geeta Bali, Bharat Bhushan, Begum Para	Drama	Music: Snehal Bhatkar; Lyrics: Kidar Sharma, Amir Khusro: "Lakhi Babul Mere Kahe Ko Deenhi Vides" (Mukesh)
Suhagi	A. Shakoor	Begum Para, Manorama, Sadiq Ali, Abu Bakar, Jilloo, Badri Prasad	Romance Triangle Drama	Music: Nashad; Lyrics: Shewan Rizvi, Manzar Faizabadi, Hareef Zanzibari
Taqdeerwale	S. H. Tharani	Chandrika, Rajan Shanta Desai, Putlibai, Maqbul, Fazlu	Action	Music: Shyam Babu Pathak, Ram Prasad; Lyrics: Muzaffar
Tigress	K. Talpade	Fearless Nadia, Sona Chatterjee, Dalpat, Jal Khambata, Prakash, Boman Shroff	Action Adventure	Music: Chitragupta; Lyrics: C. M. Hunar
Toote Tare	Harish	Sheikh Mukhtar, Mridula, Murad, Harish, Shamim, Kanhaiyalal, Putlibai, Kanchan Kumari	Drama	Music: Nashad; Lyrics: Anjum Pilibhiti, Bahadur Shah Zafar, Rafeeq Ajmeri
Tumhari Kasam	G.P. Pawar	Bhagwan, Vita Lokhre, Azim, Usha Shukla, Vasantrao Pehalwan, Baburao Pehalwan	Action	Music: Anna Saheb; Lyrics:Ehsan Rizvi
Veena	J. P. Advani	Rehman, Sulochana Chatterjee, Yakub, Veera, Hemavati, Leela Mishra, Girdhari		Music: Anil Biswas; Lyrics: Narendra Sharma, Prem Dehlvi, Swami Ramanand Saraswati
Vidya	Girish Trivedi	Suraiya, Dev Anand, Madan Puri, Ghulam Mohammad, Maya Banerjee, Cuckoo	Family Drama	Music: S. D. Burman; Lyrics: S. S. Rawat, Anjum Pilibiti, Y. N. Joshi
Vijay Yatra	Niren Lahiri	Sumitra, Ahindra Chowdhry, Sunanda, Dhiraj, Sham Laha	Social	Music: Kamal Das Gupta; Lyrics:
White Face	Balwant Dave	Navinchandra, Leela Pawar Baburao Pehalwan, Omkar, Devaskar, Putlibai, Bhim	Action	Music: K. Narayan Rao; Lyrics: Waheed Qureshi
Yeh Hai Duniya	Aspi Azad	Nawaz, Meera, Shabnam, Indira, Eruch Tarapore, Ram Kumar	Social	Music: C. Ramchandra; Lyrics: Shafi Javed, Tanveer Naqvi, I. C. Kapoor
Ziddi	Shaheed Latif	Dev Anand, Kamini Kaushal, Pran, Kuldip Kaur, Nawab, Veera, Indu Paul, Chanda	Drama	Music: Khemchand Prakash; Lyrics:
