= Naaz (film) =

1954 Indian Hindi-language film

- Directed by: S. K. Ojha
- Starring: Ashok Kumar; Veena; Nalini Jaywant
- Music by: Anil Biswas
- Release date: 1954
- Country: India
- Language: Hindi

Naaz is a 1954 Indian Hindi-language film directed by S. K. Ojha. It stars Ashok Kumar, Veena, and Nalini Jaywant. As of 2026, no complete print of the film is known to survive.

According to Limca Book of Records (2026), the film features "a rich-girl-poor-boy romance in the presence of the Sphinx". Naaz is identified as probably the earliest Hindi film to feature extensive shooting in Egypt, foreshadowing Bollywood's later use of "exotic" foreign locations.

== Plot ==
Nilima (Nalini Jaywant), a wealthy woman racketeer who runs an international smuggling ring, becomes romantically involved with a stoker (Ashok Kumar) aboard a luxury ocean liner. When the ship catches fire during their voyage, the two are shipwrecked and wash ashore in Egypt. After sharing a few romantic moments, Nilima becomes lost in the Sahara Desert.

== Cast ==
- Ashok Kumar as the stoker
- Nalini Jaywant as Nilima
- Veena

== Production ==
The film was announced in mid-1951, shortly after the commercial success of Samadhi (1950; which also co-starred Ashok Kumar and Nalini Jaywant). The filming of Naaz began in August 1951.

== Music ==
The film's music was composed by Anil Biswas.

== Release ==
The film premiered at Capitol Theatre, Bombay, on 23 July 1954.
