= Gopal Singh Nepali =

Indian writer

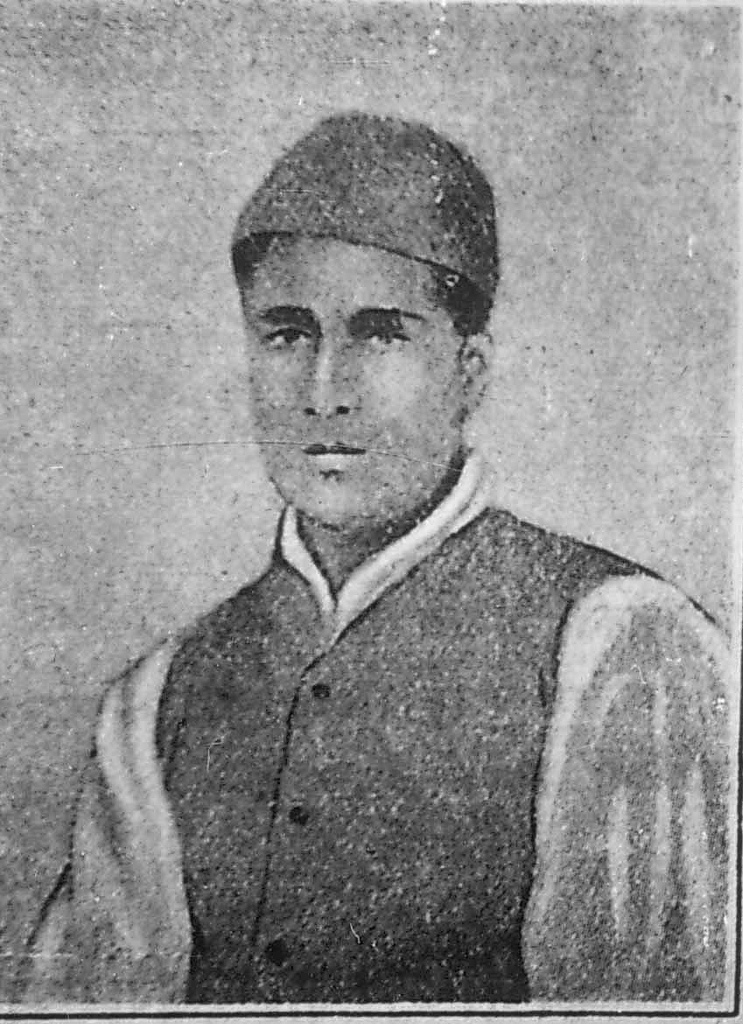
Gopal Singh Nepali

Gopal Singh Nepali (born Gopal Bahadur Singh; 11 August 1911 – 17 April 1963) was an Indian poet of Hindi literature and a lyricist of Bollywood. He was the son of Rel Bahadur Singh and Saraswati. He was born on 11 August 1911, on the birthday of Lord Krishna (Krishna Janmashtami), which got him his name. His association with Bollywood spanned around two decades, beginning in 1944 and ended with his death in 1963, penning songs for around 51 films, he had a successful collaboration with music director Chitragupta Srivastava for whom he wrote songs the maximum in his career.

He was a poet of post-Chhayavaad period, and he wrote several collections of Hindi poems including "Umang" (published in 1933). The names of famous poetry collections such as Umang, Ragini, panchhi, Neelima, Himalaya ne Pukara etc. are notable in their important works. He also wrote collections of Nepali poem as 'Kalpana'. He was also a journalist and edited at least four Hindi magazines, namely, Ratlam Times, Chitrapat, Sudha, and Yogi.

He was very respected along with his contemporaries Mahadevi Verma, Sumitranandan Pant, Suryakant Tripathi, Ramdhari Sigh Dinkar etc. His works have been included in course of different universities of India. He was born in Bettiah in the state of Bihar. During Sino-Indian War of 1962, he wrote many patriotic songs and poems which include Savan. He died at a premature age of 51 on 17 April 1963 in Bhagalpur Railway Junction platform no. 2.

== Filmography as a film lyricist ==
Year	Film	Songs written	Music Director(s)	Notes
1945	Begum	9 (All)	Hari Prasanna Das	
1945	Mazdoor	6 (All)	Hari Prasanna Das	
1946	8 Days	3-5	Sachin Dev Burman	
1946	Shikari	11 (All)	Sachin Dev Burman	
1946	Safar	10 (All)	Ramchandra Narhar Chitalkar	
1947	Ahinsa	2	Ramchandra Narhar Chitalkar	
1947	Leela	5	Ramchandra Narhar Chitalkar	
1948	Aap Beeti	1	Haribhai	
1948	Chaubeji alias Hip Hip Hurray	At least 3	Hanuman Prasad	
1948	Anokha Pyar	1	Anil Krishna Biswas	
1948	Gajre	10 (All)	Anil Krishna Biswas	
1948	Hum Bhi Insan Hain	10 (All)	Hari Prasanna Das & Manna Dey	
1949	Kamal	3	Sachin Dev Burman	
1949	Main Abala Nahin Hoon	9 (All)	M. Golwalkar & Shanta Apte	
1949	Nazrana	5 (All)	Ramchandra Narhar Chitalkar	
1952	Bhakt Puran	3	Chitragupta Srivastava	
1953	Naag Panchami	7 (All)	Chitragupta Srivastava	
1954	Durga Puja	2	Shri Nath Tripathi	
1954	Khushboo	11 (All)	Shankar Dasgupta	
1954	Raj Yogi Bharthari	At least 2	Shankar Rao Vyas	
1954	Tilottama	8 (All)	Shri Nath Tripathi	
1954	Saltanat	4	Chitragupta Srivastava	
1954	Shivratri	8 (All)	Chitragupta Srivastava	
1954	Toote Khilone	1 or 2	Chitragupta Srivastava	
1954	Tulsidas	10 (All)	Chitragupta Srivastava	
1955	Mahasati Savitri	9 (All)	Chitragupta Srivastava	
1955	Navratri	6	Chitragupta Srivastava	
1955	Raj Kanya	8 (All)	Chitragupta Srivastava	
1955	Rajdarbar	2	Chitragupta Srivastava	
1955	Sati Madalsa	9 (All)	Chitragupta Srivastava	
1955	Shiv Bhakta	14 (All)	Chitragupta Srivastava	
1955	Shri Ganesh Vivah	4	Chitragupta Srivastava	
1955	Shree Krishna Bhakti	8 (All)	Chitragupta Srivastava	
1955	Waman Avtar alias Bali Raja	6	Avinash Anandrai Vyas	
1955	Veer Rajputani	9 (All)	Bulo C. Rani	
1956	Aabroo	2	Bulo C. Rani	
1956	Gauri Puja	8 (All)	Manna Dey	
1956	Jayshri	7	Chitragupta Srivastava	
1956	Talwar Ka Dhani	3	Chitragupta Srivastava	
1956	Sati Naagkanya	3	Shri Nath Tripathi	
1956	Sudarshan Chakra	8 (All)	Avinash Anandrai Vyas	
1957	Nag Lok	2	Ram Lal Heerapanna	
1957	Narsi Bhagat	11 (All)	Ravi Shankar Sharma	One of the songs of this film "Darshan Do Ghanshyam" sung by Manna Dey, Hemant Kumar & Sudha Malhotra appeared in a quiz question in the Oscar-winning film Slumdog Millionaire (2008). The lead character of the film Jamal Malik (Dev Patel) was asked to identify the poet who wrote this song and answered Surdas. According to the quizmaster of the film Prem Kumar (Anil Kapoor), this was the right answer. However, in reality, the song was actually written by Gopal Singh Nepali, inspired by the words of the 15th century Gujarati poet Narsinh Mehta, whose biopic this film was. Music director Ravi sued the makers of Slumdog Millionaire & demanded damages of Rs. 20 crores for using this song in their film without his permission. The hook lines of the song "Vaishnav Jan Toh Tene Kahiye" (Part 2) sung by Manna Dey were taken from a poem written by Narsinh Mehta, the remaining lyrics were penned by Gopal Singh Nepali.
1957	Neelmani	4	Chitragupta Srivastava	
1957	Pavan Putra Hanuman	6	Chitragupta Srivastava	
1958	Maya Bazaar	5	Chitragupta Srivastava	
1958	Naag Champa	3	Manna Dey	
1959	Nai Raahen	2	Ravi Shankar Sharma	
1961	Apsara	At least 2	Husnlal-Bhagatram	
1961	Jai Bhavani alias Rajput Ramani	8 (All)	Mohinder Singh Sarna	
1966	Sunehre Kadam	2	Bulo C. Rani	Posthomous release
