= Amar Rahe Yeh Pyar =

1961 film

- Directed by: Prabhu Dayal
- Written by: Radha Kishan
- Story by: Radha Kishan
- Produced by: Radha Kishan; Prabhu Dayal
- Starring: Rajendra Kumar; Nalini Jaywant; Nanda
- Cinematography: K. H. Kapadia
- Edited by: R. V. Shrikhande
- Music by: C. Ramchandra; Kavi Pradeep (lyrics)
- Production company: R. P. Films
- Release date: 1961
- Country: India
- Language: Hindi

Amar Rahe Yeh Pyar is a 1961 Hindi/Urdu family drama film directed by Prabhu Dayal. Produced by Radha Kishan and Prabhu Dayal (R. P. Films), it had music by C. Ramchandra. The story, screenplay and dialogues were by written by Radha Kishan. The film starred Nalini Jaywant, Rajendra Kumar, Nanda, Honey Irani and Prabhu Dayal.

Set against the backdrop of the Partition of India (1947), it is the story of a widow who is given an infant to look after, only to have the real mother come five years later to claim it as her own.

== Plot ==
Geeta and Kishan are a happily married couple and expecting their first child. Kishan works with a contractor, Thomas, driving a truck to work. One day, he meets with an accident and dies. The grief makes Geeta lose her baby. Geeta is inconsolable and her brother Sewakram tries his best to help her mourn and deal with her sorrow. He finds an abandoned infant and brings him to Geeta, hoping that by caring for him her maternal instincts will ease the pain. It's 1947 and communal riots have spread all over the city. Advocate Iqbal Hussain and his wife Razia, had left India for the newly formed Pakistan, but due to unforeseen circumstances, their infant boy was left behind. After five years spent in anguish over their missing son, Razia and Iqbal come back to India to look for their son. Eventually, they trace him to Geeta. The boy and mother refuse to be parted, but it is imposed on Geeta to give up the boy. Razia is unable to see the misery the parting is causing her son and Geeta. She makes the final sacrifice and returns with her husband to Pakistan, having left the boy behind in India with Geeta.

== Cast ==
- Rajendra Kumar as Advocate Iqbal Hussain
- Nanda as Razia Hussain
- Nalini Jaywant as Geeta
- Chandan Kumar as Kishan
- Radha Kishan as Sewakram
- Honey Irani
- Tiwari as Bahadur
- Narbada Shankar
- Sarita
- S. Nazir

== Music ==
The music composer was C. Ramchandra and the songs were written by Kavi Pradeep. Asha Bhosle and Suman Kalyanpur provided the female playback for the songs. The male singer was Pradeep, who wrote strongly about the communal violence in his lyrics, with his "raw" voice matching the pathos required. According to one source, a song written by Pradeep, "Hai, Yeh Siyasat Kitni Gandi" (Alas! How Dirty Are The Politics of the Time), critical of the establishment, was censored from the film.

=== Song list ===
| Song | Singer |
|---|---|
| "Aaj Ke Insan Ko" | Kavi Pradeep |
| "Dekho Ye Ghayal Taqdeeren" | Kavi Pradeep |
| "Mere Andhere Ghar Mein" | Asha Bhosle |
| "Lakhon Log Chale Hain" | Asha Bhosle, Kavi Pradeep |
| "Mujhse Bichadke" | Kavi Pradeep, Suman Kalyanpur |
