= S. K. Ojha =

Indian film director

S.K. Ojha
- Born: Shubh Karan Ojha; 16 October 1921; Hathras, India
- Died: 4 October 1980 (aged 58); Mumbai, Maharashtra, India
- Years active: 1939–1980

Shubh Karan Ojha (16 October 1921 – 4 October 1980) was an Indian film director. He was educated at Kanpur. He directed his first film at the age of twenty five. The film was "Doli", produced by the renowned film sound recordist and producer-director Prem Narayan Arora.

== Filmography ==
=== As director ===
Films directed by S. K. Ojha:

Year	Film	Cast	Producer	Notes
1947	Doli	Wasti, Sulochna Chatterjee, Shashikala, Jayant	Prem Narayan Arora	Music: Ghulam Mohammad; Cinematography: Shailen Bose, Dwarka Divecha
1948	Nai Reet	Sulochna Chatterjee, Geeta Bali	R. N. Simhal	Music: S. K. Pal Cinematography: Dwarka Divecha
1950	Aadhi Raat	Ashok Kumar, Nargis, Jeevan, Kuldip Kaur	Kuldip Saigal	Writer: Khwaja Ahmad Abbas, V. P. Sathe; Music: Anil Biswas; Cinematography: Keki Mistry
1951	Hulchul	Dilip Kumar, Nargis, Balraj Sahni, Sitara Devi, Yakub, K. N. Singh and Jeevan	K. Asif	Music: Sajjad Hussain, Mohammed Shafi Niyazi; Cinematography: V. N. Reddy
1954	Naaz	Ashok Kumar, Nalini Jaywant, Nawab, Veena	(Himself)	Writer: K A Abbas, V. P. Sathe; Music: Anil Biswas; Cinematography: Keki Mistry
1955	Sitara	Vyjayanthimala, Pradeep Kumar, Begum Para, Om Prakash, Gope, Helen, Jayant, Shashikala	Prem Narayan Arora	Music: Ghulam Mohammad; Cinematography: Shivaji Avdhoot
1959	Daiwayogaya (Sinhalese)	Rukmani Devi	E. J. C. De Soysa	Music: Sajjad Hussain Cinematography: Keki Mistry

=== As Story Writer ===
Year	Film	Cast	Director	Notes
1946	Chehra	Najma, Surriya Zulfi, Kamal Zamindar	Rajendra Sharma	Music: M. A. Mukhtar
1954	Mastana	Motilal, Nigar Sultana, Kuldip Kaur, Master Romi	H. S. Rawail	Music: Madan Mohan
1971	Upaasana	Feroze Khan, Sanjay Khan, Mumtaz	Mohan	Music: Kalyanji Anandji

=== As Executive Producer ===
- Agni Rekha (1973) Written & Directed by Mahesh Kaul. *Sanjeev Kumar and Sharda. Music Kalyanji Anandji
