= Aankh Michouli =

1942 film directed by R.S. Choudhury

Aankh Micholi
- Directed by: R.S. Choudhury
- Starring: Nalini Jaywant; Satish
- Music by: Gyan Dutt
- Production company: Amar Pictures
- Release date: 1942
- Running time: 128 minutes
- Country: India
- Language: Hindi

Aankh Micholi (Blind Man's Bluff) is a 1942 Hindi social film. The music direction was done by Gyan Dutt with lyrics written by Pandit Indra, Satyakam Sharma and Shatir Ghaznavi. The cast included Nalini Jaywant, Sulochana (Ruby Myers), Satish, Jilloobai, Hadi, Pratima Devi, Anand Prasad Kapoor and Kamla Chatterjee.

== Cast ==
- Nalini Jaywant
- Sulochana (Ruby Myers)
- Satish
- Jilloobai
- Hadi
- Pratima Devi
- A. P. Kapoor
- Kamla Chatterjee

== Soundtrack ==
The music was composed by Gyan Dutt with lyrics by Pandit Indra Chandra, Satyakam Sharma and Shatir Ghaznavi. The singers were Leela Sawant, Nalini Jaywant, Rajkumari, Satish and Sumati Trilokekar.

=== Song list ===
#	Title	Singer	Lyricist
1	"Duniya Hasegi Mujhpe Rota Hai Kyun"	Leela Sawant	Pandit Indra
2	"Aankh Michauli Aankh Michauli"	Nalini Jaywant, Rajkumari	Shatir Ghaznavi
3	"Zulmi Jawani Ne Zulm Kiya"	Sumati Trilokekar	Pandit Indra
4	"Dekho Ji Na Chedo"	Nalini Jaywant	Shatir Ghaznavi
5	"Main Toh Bade Baap Ki Beti Re"	Nalini Jaywant	Pandit Indra
6	"Kaun Jaane Re Meri Nathani Ka Mol"	Nalini Jaywant	Pandit Indra
7	"Maar Gayo Ek Teer Haaye Ram"	Rajkumari	Pandit Indra
8	"Balam Re Yaad Karo Woh Baat"		Pandit Indra Chandra
9	"Ae Ri Maai Maai Ri Mere Babul Se"	Nalini Jaywant	Pandit Indra
10	"Na Haan Kaho Na Naa Kaho"	Nalini Jaywant, Satish	Pandit Indra
11	"Jag Mein Kiska Prem Bada Hai"	Nalini Jaywant	Satyakam
