= Hindustan Hamara (1950 film) =

- Poster
- Directed by: Paul Zils
- Starring: Prithviraj Kapoor; Dev Anand; Durga Khote; Nalini Jaywant
- Release date: 1 January 1950
- Running time: 139 minutes
- Country: India
- Language: Hindi

Hindustan Hamara (lit. 'India is ours') is a 1950 Bollywood film directed by Paul Zils and starring Prithviraj Kapoor and Dev Anand.

== Cast ==
- Prithviraj Kapoor
- Dev Anand
- Durga Khote
- Nalini Jaywant
