= Baap Beti =

- Directed by: Bimal Roy
- Produced by: Gopi Rohra
- Starring: Nalini Jaiwant; Asha Parekh; Nazir Hussain
- Music by: Roshan
- Production company: Bhagyalaxmi Chitra Mandir
- Release date: 1954

Baap Beti is a 1954 Indian Hindi drama film directed by Bimal Roy. The film was produced by Gopi Rohra and stars Nalini Jaiwant, as well as Asha Parekh as a child artist.

== Production ==
Baap Beti is the only film by Roy to be adapted from a Western literary work, namely Maupassant "Simon's Papa".

== Release ==
The film was a "debacle".

== Songs ==
1. "Duniya Bananewale Ramoji" - Lata Mangeshkar
2. "Koyal Bole Ku Papiha Bole Pi" - Lata Mangeshkar
3. "Le Chal Ri Nindiya Le Chal Hame Tu Chanda" - Lata Mangeshkar
4. "Andhere Se Ujale Ki Taraf Le Ja Hame" - Lata Mangeshkar
