= Anokha Pyar =

- Directed by: M. I. Dharamsey
- Produced by: Sitaram V. Mungrey
- Starring: Dilip Kumar; Nargis; Nalini Jaywant
- Cinematography: Jal Mistry
- Music by: Anil Biswas
- Production company: Ambica Films
- Release date: 1948
- Country: India
- Language: Hindi

Anokha Pyar (lit. 'Rare love') is a 1948 Indian Hindi language film. The film stars Dilip Kumar, Nargis, Nalini Jaywant in lead roles. The black and white romantic love triangle was directed by M. I. Dharamsey under the Ambika Films banner. The film was initially titled Dil Ki Awaz before being renamed Anokha Pyar. The music was composed by Anil Biswas, who gave a then unknown young Lata Mangeshkar maximum songs to sing for the film. The rest of the cast includes Sankatha Prasad, Mukri, Ved, Kesarbai, Habib and Sheikh.

== Plot ==
Ashok (Dilip Kumar) is an impoverished writer waiting for his book to be published. He meets Bindiya (Nalini Jaywant), a flower-seller, who insists he buy some flowers from her. Ashok gives his last two annas (12 pence) to her. A rogue tries to snatch the money from Bindiya and when Ashok tries to help her, the rogue punches him in the face, temporarily blinding him. Bindiya takes him to the local doctor. Since he has nowhere to stay, Ashok stays with the doctor and his family until he recovers. The doctor's daughter Geeta (Nargis) falls in love with Ashok. Bindiya has also fallen in love with Ashok and cares deeply for him. Ashok is implicated in a murder case and is imprisoned. Geeta's father dies and her two aunts come to stay with her. Meanwhile, Bindiya manages to find a suicide note written by Ashok's alleged victim and Ashok is proven to be innocent. Geeta's aunts happen to see Bindiya with Ashok and believe her to be Ashok's wife. They convince Geeta to marry Ashok's publisher. After some more melodramatic turns in the story, Bindiya dies and Ashok and Geeta unite. Ashok's book is finally published and becomes popular.

== Cast ==
- Dilip Kumar as Ashok
- Nargis as Geeta
- Nalini Jaywant as Bindiya
- Sankatha Prasad as the publisher
- Mukri
- Munshu Munakka
- Kesarbai
- Amir Bano as one of the aunts

== Soundtrack ==
Lata Mangeshkar was still finding a niche for herself in the Hindi film industry and according to Ganesh Anantharaman, it was a brave move by composer Anil Biswas to use the "tinny vocals" of Lata in songs like "Jeevan Sapna Toot Gaya" and "Mere Liye Woh Gham-E-Intazar Chhod Gaye", sung by Lata Mangeshkar and Meena Kapoor. Other popular songs were "Yaad Rakhna Chaand Taaro" sung by Lata and Mukesh, "Ek Dil Ka Lagana Baqi Tha" sung by Lata. The lyricists were Zia Sarhadi, Gopal Singh Nepali, Behzad Lakhnavi and Shams Azimabadi.

Title	Singer (film version)	Singer (78 RPM version)	Lyricist
"Jeevan Sapna Toot Gaya"	Mukesh		Zia Sarhadi
"Yaad Rakhna Chand Taaron" (Part 1)	Mukesh & Lata Mangeshkar		Zia Sarhadi
"Yaad Rakhna Chand Taaron" (Part 2)	Meena Kapoor		Zia Sarhadi
"Yaad Rakhna Chand Taaron"	Lata Mangeshkar		Zia Sarhadi
"Jeevan Sapna Toot Gaya"	Lata Mangeshkar		Zia Sarhadi
"Ek Dil Ka Lagana Baki Tha"	Lata Mangeshkar		Zia Sarhadi
"Bhola Bhala Ri Mora Balama Na Jaane"	Lata Mangeshkar		Zia Sarhadi
"Ghadi Ghadi Poochhon Na Ji Unse Meri Preet Hai"	Lata Mangeshkar		Gopal Singh Nepali
"Mere Phoolon Mein Chhipi Hai Jawani"	Lata Mangeshkar		Behzad Lucknavi
"Mere Liye Woh Gham-E-Intazar Chhod Gaye"	Meena Kapoor	Lata Mangeshkar	Behzad Lucknavi
"Ab Yaad Na Kar Bhool Jaa Ae Dil Woh Fasana"	Mukesh & Meena Kapoor	Mukesh & Lata Mangeshkar	Shams Azimabadi
"Ai Dil Meri Wafa Me Koyi Asar Nahin Hai"	Lata Mangeshkar & Ira Roshan		Shams Azimabadi
