= Aadab Arz =

- Directed by: V. C. Desai
- Produced by: Amar Pictures
- Starring: Nalini Jaywant; Karan Dewan; Mukesh; Dulari
- Music by: Gyan Dutt
- Release date: 1943
- Country: India
- Language: Hindi

Aadab Arz is a Bollywood film directed by V. C. Desai. It was released in 1943. It was produced by "Amar Pictures" which was a company started by Chimanlal Desai after he left National Studios. The film starred Nalini Jaywant, Karan Dewan, Mukesh, Kamla Chatterjee and Dulari. The music was composed by Gyan Dutt and the lyricists were Rammurti Chaturvedi, Pandit Indra and Kailash Matwala.
