= Varasdar =

- Directed by: Maganlal Thakkar
- Written by: Damu Sangani
- Produced by: Laxmichand Shah
- Starring: Harsukh Kikani; Nalini Jaywant; Kusum Thacker; Hasmukhkumar; Saguna; Kamlesh Thacker
- Cinematography: Gordhanbhai Patel
- Edited by: Dalpatbhai Thacker
- Music by: Avinash Vyas
- Production company: Shri Saurashtra Production
- Release date: 1948
- Running time: 138 minutes
- Country: India
- Language: Gujarati

Varasdar (Gujarati: વારસદાર, lit. 'The Heir') is a 1948 Indian Gujarati social drama film directed by Maganlal Thakkar. The film was produced by Laxmichand Shah and starred Harsukh Kikani and Nalini Jaywant in lead roles. The soundtrack was composed by Avinash Vyas.

== Plot ==
Biharilal, a wealthy merchant from Ahmedabad, takes in his nephew Vinay, who is struggling with unemployment. Vinay meets Neela. Neela's uncle, Jayaprasad, who has lost money in gambling, tries to persuade the childless Biharilal to marry Neela, but Biharilal does not agree. When Neela discovers her uncle's plan, she asks Vinay to marry her. However, Vinay does not want to proceed without Biharilal's approval, which makes Neela think he is cowardly, and she leaves with her father.

To test Vinay, Biharilal gives him control of the business and goes to an unknown place to serve the poor under the name Ghanshyam Dada. There, he meets Neela and her poor father. Vinay successfully grows the business and also engages in charity work. Biharilal continue to receive news about Vinay's progress. In search of Neela, Vinay places a marriage advertisement. Biharilal sees the advertisement and reunites Vinay with Neela, bringing them together as a couple.

== Cast ==
The cast is as follows:

- Harsukh Kikani as Vinay
- Nalini Jaywant as Neela
- Kusum Thacker
- Hasmukh Kumar
- Saguna
- Kamlesh Thacker
- Bhagwan Das
- Miss Savaria
- Bakulesh Pandit
- Kamlakant
- Tarabai

== Production ==
The film was directed by Maganlal Thakkar. The film was produced by Laxmichand Shah under banner of Shri Saurashtra Production. Harsukh Kikani, the popular stage comedian of Saurashtra region and Bollywood actress Nalini Jaywant were cast in lead roles. It is Jaywant's only Gujarati film. The story was written by Damu Sangani. Gordhanbhai Patel was a cinematographer while Kanu Vyas was and art director. Dalpatbhai Thacker served as an editor. It was shot on 35mm film and was 12344 feet long.

A scene depicting Vinay sniffing the woman's sandal, lifting a woman customer's saree and subsequently trashed by her; was removed on the instructions of the Central Board of Film Certification.

== Soundtrack ==
Varasdar

Soundtrack album by Avinash Vyas
- Released: 20 September 1948
- Studio: Shri Saurashtra Production
- Genre: Feature film soundtrack
- Language: Gujarati

All music is composed by Avinash Vyas

Track listing
No.	Title	Singer(s)	Length
1.	"Ek Hato Raja Ne Ek Hati Rani"	Nalini Jaywant, Harsukh Kikani	3:01
2.	"Avyo Hu Bangdivalo, Rang Rangili Bangdino"	Geeta Dutt, Nalini Jaywant	3:05
3.	"Hu Shu Karu? Koi Kalju Lai Jay Che"	Nalini Jaywant	3:20
4.	"Aaj Sakhi Ursagar Aare Utarta Pani"	Nalini Jaywant	3:08
5.	"Kadka Balish Kare Boot Polish"	Harsukh Kikani	3:03
6.	"Tare Thavu Kaya Morlani Dhel?"	Nalini Jaywant	3:11
7.	"Ishq Ni Gali Ma Hardam Kadam Na Rakho, Preet Kari To Kari Jano"
Total length:			18:48
