= Rajkanya (1955 film) =

- Starring: Smriti Biswas; Manher Desai; Manher Desai; Nalini Jaywant; Kumkum; Sunder; B.M. Vyas
- Release date: 1955
- Country: India
- Language: Hindi

Raj Kanya is a 1955 Hindi Bollywood film starring Nalini Jaywant, with playback by Mohammed Rafi and Asha Bhosle. Music by Chitragupt and lyrics by G S Nepali.
