= Lakirein =

Lakeeren
- Directed by: Harbans Singh Khurana
- Starring: Ashok Kumar; Nalini Jaywant; Pran
- Music by: Hafiz Khan
- Production company: Sushil Pictures
- Release date: 1954
- Country: India
- Language: Hindi

Lakeeren is a 1954 Hindi Bollywood film starring Ashok Kumar, Nalini Jaywant in lead roles, music by Hafiz Khan & Lyrics by Shevan Rizvi.

== Songs ==
Song	Singer
"Mere Malik Meri Kismat Ko"	G. M. Durrani
"Duniya Se Ja Raha Hoon"	Talat Mahmood
"Dil Ke Dhadkan Pa Ga"	Talat Mahmood
"Mohabbat Ki Duniya Mein Barbad Rehna Magar"	Talat Mahmood, Geeta Dutt
"Daman Na Chhuda"	Geeta Dutt
"Aabad Jahan Barbad Kiya"	Geeta Dutt
"Tujhse Shikwa Kiya Nahin"	Geeta Dutt
"Nimbua Pe Papiha Bola, Kandua Pe Koyal Gaye"	Geeta Dutt, Shamshad Begum
"Jab Teer Chalata"	Shamshad Begum

== Cast ==
- Ashok Kumar
- Nalini Jaywant
- Pran
- Durga Khote
- Ramayan Tiwari
- Cukoo
- Sulochana Latkar
- Yakub
- Kamal
