= Naujawan (1951 film) =

1951 film by Mahesh Kaul

Naujawan (transl. Youngsters) is 1951 Hindi film directed by Mahesh Kaul. It stars Premnath, Nalini Jaywant, Yashodhara Katju, Kamal Mehra, Zeb Qureshi, Cuckoo, S.N. Banerjee.

== Soundtrack ==
The music was composed by S.D. Burman and Sahir Ludhianvi wrote the lyrics. The movie is remembered for the hauntingly melodious song "Thandi Hawayein" by Lata Mangeshkar. Notably, legendary music director Ravi started his musical career with this film by singing in chorus.

1. "Pi Pi Piya" - Kishore Kumar and Shamshad Begum
2. "Dekho Dekho Ji Kuch bhi" - Kishore Kumar and Lata Mangeshkar
3. "Thandi Hawayein" - Lata Mangeshkar
4. "Panghat Pe Dekho Aayee Milan Ki Bela" - Mohammed Rafi, Geeta Dutt, Shamshad Begum and chorus
5. "Ek Aag Dahekta" - Manna Dey
6. "Jiya Jaye Piya Aaja" - Lata Mangeshkar
7. "Zara Jhoom Le" - Mohammed Rafi and Geeta Dutt
