= Nastik (1954 film) =

- Song synopsis booklet cover
- Directed by: I. S. Johar
- Written by: Ramma Johar
- Screenplay by: I. S. Johar
- Story by: I. S. Johar
- Produced by: S. Mukherjee
- Starring: Nalini Jaywant; Ajit; Ulhas; Raj Mehra
- Cinematography: Dronacharya
- Edited by: Babu Lavande; D. N. Pai (Supervisor)
- Music by: C. Ramchandra
- Production company: Filmistan Ltd.
- Distributed by: Filmistan Ltd.
- Release date: 1954
- Running time: 149 minutes
- Country: India
- Language: Hindi

Nastik (transl. The Atheist) is a 1954 Indian Hindi-language crime drama film written and directed by I. S. Johar. It was produced by Filmistan Ltd.. Its cinematographer was Dronacharya, and the choreography was by the Indian classical dancer Lachhu Maharaj and Narendra Sharma. The dialogues were by Mrs. Ramma Johar. C. Ramchandra composed the music while the lyricist was Kavi Pradeep. Known for his "patriotic" lyrics, Pradeep's "immortal" song "Dekh Tere Sansar Ki Haalat Kya Ho Gayi Bhagwan" (See What Your World Has Come To, God) sung by him, remains popular. The film starred Nalini Jaywant, Ajit, Raj Mehra, Ulhas, Mehmood and Roopmala.

The film was dubbed into Tamil and released in 1962 as Madadhipathi Magal (transl. The Abbot's Daughter). Dialogues and lyrics were written by Ku. Ma. Balasubramaniam.

Opening with a philosophical verse from Kabir, the film is set against the back drop of Partition with its ensuing riots and violence, and using actual footage of refugees. The story is about a man who loses his faith in God when his parents are killed in the rioting, and his brother and sister die as refugees when the priest refuses to help them. He sets out to avenge his siblings' death.

== Plot ==
Anil (Ajit), sees his parents killed in front of him during the violence of partition and flees with his sister Kamla (Kamala), and young brother Munna. Having to leave everything behind them in Pakistan, they enter India as refugees and take shelter in a temple. When Munna falls sick, Anil goes to Tulsiram, the Mahant (priest) (Ulhas) for help. The priest has no time for the poor, and refuses to visit the sick child. An infuriated Anil attacks the priest, who calls the police and has him arrested. His brother dies and Kamala is forced to become a singing girl (Tawaif) by Vinod Kumar (Raj Mehra) and his henchman (Mehmood). When Anil comes out of prison he is devastated to find his brother dead and his sister a courtesan. The sister kills herself out of shame. Anil vows vengeance on the priest and Vinod. His belief in God is lost and he becomes an atheist, deriding god and priests. His friend from jail, Joker (I. S. Johar) is with him. Tulsiram on finding out that Anil has vowed vengeance on him, is on the run with his daughter. He goes on a pilgrimage with Anil and Joker in pursuit. Joker thanks God that at least this way an atheist will also perform a pilgrimage.

Anil meets Rama (Nalini Jaywant), the priest Tulsiram's daughter when he sees Rani Ma, (Leela Mishra) scolding an untouchable boy for touching her, begging for alms. A priest hits the boy and Anil in turn hits the priest. Rama tends to the boy and Anil finds out she is Tulsiram's daughter. He decides to revenge himself by marrying Rama, an act which would be disagreeable to the priest. With contrived circumstances, he gets Rama who has fallen in love with Anil, to marry him. They spend the night together and are out in the boat with the father after them when they both fall in the water. Rama is saved by her father but finds out later that she's pregnant. She presumes that Anil is dead. A son is born to her and when he falls sick she takes him to a God-man, Babaji, whom everyone believes has healing powers. Babaji is none other than Anil pretending to be a God-man. Once Anil discovers that Rama is alive and his son is ill a change comes over him, and with the recovery of his son his belief is restored.

== Cast ==
- Ajit as Anil Kumar Rampal / Babaji
- Nalini Jaywant as Rama
- Ulhas as Mahant Tulsiram / Pujari
- I. S. Johar as Joker
- Raj Mehra as Vinod Kumar Mehra
- Roopmala as Kamla Rampal / Courtesan
- Leela Mishra as Rani Ma, Vinod's mother
- Mumtaz Begum as Mataji
- Mehmood as Vinod's henchman
- Rajen Haksar

== Review and reception ==
The film was highly successful at the box-office, running for fifty weeks (Golden jubilee) even though the film was banned initially. Nastik made use of "documentary footage of refugees in overcrowded trains to show the mass exodus of people from both sides of the border". Later Yash Chopra's Dharmputra (1960) was to show similar footage.

Nastik highlighted the anguish of partition, and is stated to be one of the better films on the subject, and is still used as a benchmark in comparison to other films on the same topic. The film shows Hindu shrines "spread all over" India, with Dwarka, Rameshwar, Puri, Varanasi, and Brindavan among others.

== Soundtrack ==
The music direction was by C. Ramchandra. Lyricist Kavi Pradeep, known for his "inspirational verses" wrote the famous "thought-provoking" song "Dekh Tere...Kitna Badal Gaya Insaan". The playback singers were Pradeep, Lata Mangeshkar, Hemant Kumar and C. Ramchandra. . Kavi Pradeep's classic ‘Kitna Badal Gaya Insaan’, which invokes the almighty to look upon his creation and its deeds, remains immortal. Poet Sahir Ludhianvi wrote a song in response to this, composed to the same tune by C Ramchandra, as a sarcastic rejoinder to those who tend to blame all of society's ills on god's will. The song, 'Dekh Tere Bhagwan Ki Haalat Kya Ho Gayi Insaan', from Railway Platform (1955), pointed to the differences between the rich and the poor, but instead of lamenting the actions of mankind and invoking god, as Pradeep did, Sahir turned it on its head to say god had changed!

=== Song list (Hindi) ===
| Song | Singer |
|---|---|
| "Kitna Badal Gaya Insan" | Kavi Pradeep |
| "Tere Hote Hue Aaj Main" | Lata Mangeshkar |
| "Jai Jai Ram Raghu Rai" | Lata Mangeshkar |
| "Kanha Bajaye Bansari" | Lata Mangeshkar |
| "Jhuki Jaye Nazar" | Lata Mangeshkar |
| "Kaise Aaye Hai Din" | Lata Mangeshkar |
| "Jo Bhi Dena Chahe De De" | Lata Mangeshkar |
| "Gagan Jhanjhana Raha, Pawan Sansana Raha, Lahar Lahar Pe Aaj Hai Toofan" | Lata Mangeshkar, Hemant Kumar |
| "Zor Laga Le Arey Zamane, Kitna Zor Lagayega" | Lata Mangeshkar, C. Ramchandra |

=== Song list (Tamil) ===
All lyrics were penned by Ku. Ma. Balasubramaniam.

| # | Title | Singer |
|---|---|---|
| 1 | "Maanilamel Sila Maanidaraal" | Thiruchi Loganathan |
| 2 | "Vidhi Vinnil Meerudhe" | Thiruchi Loganathan & Lakshmi Shankar |
| 3 | "En Angamengum Pongiduthe" | Lakshmi Shankar |
| 4 | "Amirdhamum Vishamum Serndhe" | Lakshmi Shankar |
| 5 | "Gopaalan Venuganam Paada" | Lakshmi Shankar |
| 6 | "Yeno Madamai Ulaginar Varuga" | Lakshmi Shankar |
| 7 | "Maaraa Maiyal" | Lakshmi Shankar |
