= Bahen (film) =

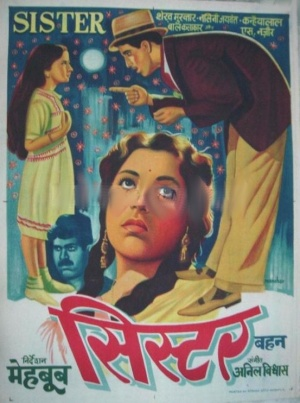
- Directed by: Mehboob Khan
- Written by: Babubhai Mehta; Zia Sarhadi
- Produced by: National Studios
- Starring: Sheikh Mukhtar; Nalini Jaywant; Harish; Meena Kumari; Kanhaiyalal; Meena Shorey; Dulari; Bhudo Advani
- Cinematography: Faredoon Irani
- Edited by: Shamsuddin Qadri
- Music by: Anil Biswas
- Production company: National Studios
- Release date: 6 August 1941
- Running time: 156 min
- Country: India
- Language: Hindi

Bahen, 1941

Bahen (Hindi बहन, Sister) is a 1941 Hindi film directed by Mehboob Khan. Sagar Movietone had closed down at the start of WW II and reformed as National Studios. It was under the new banner that Mehboob Khan produced his three important films of that time, Aurat (1940), Bahen (1941) and Roti (1942). Written by Babubhai Mehta and Zia Sarhadi, it had dialogues and screenplay by Wajahat Mirza. The cinematography was by Faredoon Irani. Anil Biswas was the music director with lyrics by Safdar Aah. The cast included Sheikh Mukhtar, Nalini Jaywant, Harish, Kanhaiyalal, Husn Bano, Swaroop Rani, Baby Meena (Meena Kumari) and Bhudo Advani.

It was the first film of Nalini Jaywant; she played the younger sister to Sheikh Mukhtar, who takes her responsibility after their parents perish in an earthquake. He lives for her and does everything required to keep her safe and happy even to the extent of moving and changing his job many times. So much so that he doesn't realize that she has grown up and needs to live her own life. The film brought Jaywant into prominence.

== Plot ==
Having saved his little sister Bina (Baby Meena Kumari) from the floods, Amar (Sheikh Mukhtar) becomes increasingly possessive about her over the years. Amar falls in love twice but forgoes marriage so he can look after the growing Bina. Bina (Nalini Jaywant), now a grown up young girl falls in love with the social activist Rajendra (Harish). However, Amar cannot bear to lose Bina and so he plans her marriage to the thief Moti Kanhaiyalal, with the idea that he'll get her divorced after some time and then Bina would stay with him always. After several incidents that end up uniting Rajendra and Bina, Amar gets some happiness when a daughter is born to Bina.

== Cast ==
- Sheikh Mukhtar as Amar
- Nalini Jaywant as Bina
  - Baby Meena as young Bina
- Harish as Rajendra
- Dulari nurse in hospital
- Kanhaiyalal as Moti
- Meena Shorey
- Husn Bano
- Swaroop Rani
- Shahzadi
- Devi Mukherjee as the mendicant
- R. Choube
- Bhudo Advani
- Agashe
- Iqbal Begum
- Beena Kumari

== Music ==
Song list

#	Title	Singer
1	"Piya Ghar Jaana, Sajan Ghar Jaana"	Nalini Jaywant
2	"Aayi Jawani, Jiya Laharay"	Sheikh Mukhtar, Nalini Jaywant
3	"Nahi Khatey Hai Bhaiya Mere Paan"	Sheikh Mukhtar, Nalini Jaywant
4	"Tore Kajra Lagaoon Mori"	Beena Kumari, Baby Meena
5	"Mora Pihu Pihu Mann Bole"	Husn Bano
6	"Ratoo Nish Din Tera Naam Re"	Husn Bano
7	"Preet Nahi Jaane Balam More Bhole"	Iqbal
8	"Mohe Le Chal Apni Nagariya"	Husn Bano, Nalini Jaywant
9	"Koyal Gaa Re Papihe"	Husn Bano
10	"Kiye Ja Sabka Bhala"	Anil Biswas
11	"Aaj Chali Sasural Sakhi Ri"	Anil Biswas
12	"Kyun Karta Hai Murakh Asha"	Anil Biswas
