= Neelmani =

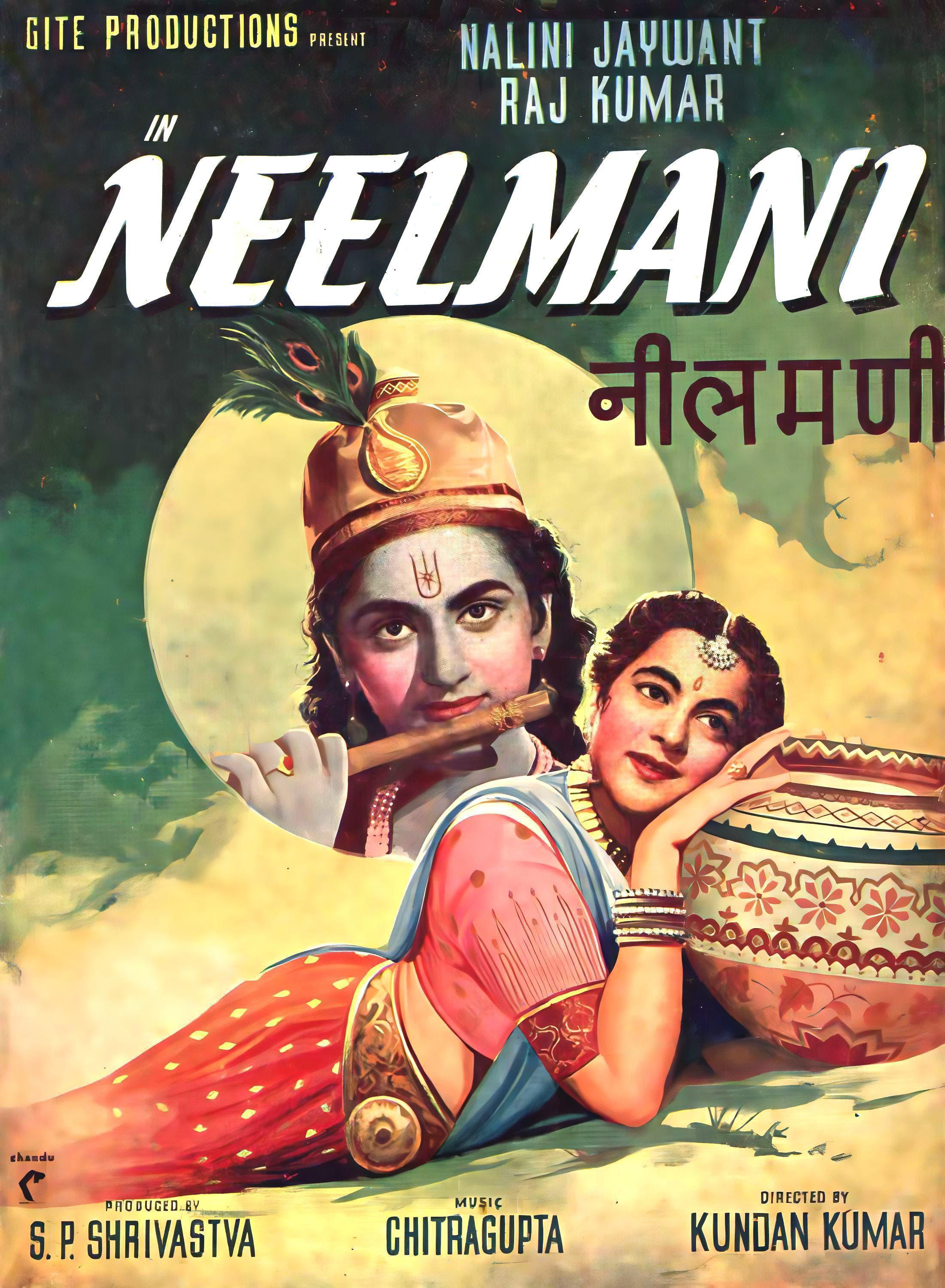
- Film poster
- Directed by: Kundan Kumar
- Starring: Nalini Jaywant; Raaj Kumar; Prem Adib
- Music by: Chitragupta
- Release date: 1957
- Running time: 140 minutes
- Country: India
- Language: Hindi

Neelmani is a 1957 Indian Hindi-language film starring Nalini Jaywant.

The film became popular partly because of its evergreen bhajan, "Suunaa Suunaa Laage Biraj Kaa Dhaam", sung by Mohammed Rafi.

== Music ==
1. "Suna Suna Lage Biraj Ka Dham Gokal Ko Chod" – Mohammed Rafi
2. "O Mere Sanware Kanhayi" – Lata Mangeshkar
3. "Ho Muraliwale Ho Muraliwale" – Lata Mangeshkar
4. "Jab Paap Ki Aandhi" – Sudha Malhotra
5. "Jai Kanhaiya Lal Ki Jai Kanhaiya Lal Ki" – Suman Kalyanpur, Mohammed Rafi
6. "Nache Gokul Ki Goriya" – Lata Mangeshkar
7. "Nand Gaanv Ri Kadamb Chhaanv Ri" – Lata Mangeshkar
