= Gunjan (film) =

- Directed by: V. C. Desai
- Starring: Balraj Sahni; Nalini Jaywant
- Release date: 1948
- Country: India
- Language: Hindi

Gunjan is a 1948 Indian Hindi-language film directed by V. C. Desai. The film starred Balraj Sahni and Nalini Jaywant, at the time when both actors were in the initial phase of their careers. Gunjan was theatrically released in Bombay in early 1949. It was a box office failure.
