= Sangram (1950 film) =

- Directed by: Gyan Mukherjee
- Written by: Gyan Mukherjee (story & screenplay); Vrajendra Gaur (dialogues)
- Produced by: Sargam Pictures' Unit
- Starring: Ashok Kumar; Nalini Jaywant
- Cinematography: Josef Wirsching
- Edited by: Vishnu Borkar
- Music by: C. Ramchandra
- Production company: The Bombay Talkies Limited Studios, Malad
- Distributed by: The Bombay Talkies Limited Studios, Malad
- Release date: 1950
- Country: India
- Language: Hindi

Sangram is a 1950 Indian Hindi-language film about a spoilt child in adulthood, directed by Gyan Mukherjee and starring Ashok Kumar, Nalini Jaywant in lead roles. A box office success, the film became the sixth highest earning Indian film of 1950, earning an approximate gross of Rs. 1,00,00,000 and a net of Rs. 55,00,000. "Sangram" is a precursor to the cop-father – criminal-son theme that later came to be a favourite in Bollywood, though it was made in film noir style that had begun to inspire filmmakers, and Gyan Mukherjee was no exception. An intense, bold 139-minute violent crime drama, with Ashok Kumar daring to essay a negative character, at a time that he was in great demand as a hero. And he excelled in it. The first of the many such films he went on to star in during the early '50s.

== Plot ==
A cop brings up his motherless son, spoiling him by succumbing to even his unnecessary demands, resulting in his getting familiar with ruffians and even gambling. The boy Kunwar Rajendra K. Singh (Shashi Kapoor) even once carries his father's pistol and fires it at a chum in a fit of rage. Timely help from his father (Nawab) saves him from the lock-up.

On growing up, Kunwar (Ashok Kumar) moves to a city and starts running a casino in the guise of a hotel. But he is betrayed by one of his own confidantes, and the police raid the hotel, and although gets hurt, manages to escape, and happens to meet his childhood companion Kanta (Tabassum), who has grown up to be an attractive young woman (Nalini Jaywant). Kunwar's dark past catches up with him in the form of an old accomplice Pyarelal (Ramayan Tiwari), who blackmails him as he is about to get married. He steals his deceased mother's jewellery helped by the dancing girl in his casino who, unwittingly, gets arrested.

To avenge the wrong, he goes after the criminals. During the fight in a running train, the gangster falls off and gets killed. When he returns with the stolen jewellery, the cops recognise him as the guy wanted in the casino raid, and put him behind bars. He escapes from prison on learning that his ladylove was going to be married off.

He kidnaps her and takes her to the dancing girl's house for refuge. The story takes yet another twist as the dancer feels betrayed, as she too loves him, and tries to alert the cops.

In a frenzy he shoots her, upsetting his own woman in the process. Cornered by cops, he indiscriminately fires, killing them all in the process. He is eventually shot dead by his own father when he tries to fool him by threatening to kill his own beloved though his pistol is empty.

But not before the customary dying speech.

== Cast ==
- Ashok Kumar as Kunwar Rajendra K. Singh (Raje)
- Nalini Jaywant as Kanta (Munni)
- Ramayan Tiwari as Pyare Lal
- Sajjan as Babu Lal
- Hemawati Sapru as Mohini
- S. N. Banerjee as Tota
- Nawab as Thakur Narendra Singh
- Shashi Kapoor as Young Kunwar
- Tabassum as Young Kanta

== Soundtrack ==
The film, which had C. Ramchandra composing for the six songs by Pyare Lal Santoshi (uncredited), Raja Mehdi Ali Khan and Vrajendra Gaur, who also wrote the dialogue, with insightful black-and-white camerawork by Josef Wirsching turned out to be one of the biggest blockbusters of its time, raking in, reportedly, Rs.55 lakhs in profits.

Song	Singers(s)	Lyricist	Notes
"Nazar Se Nazar Jo Milaayi Gayi Hai..." (excluded from film)	Lata Mangeshkar	Pyare Lal Santoshi (uncredited)	This song was issued on records but it appears it was not included in the film itself and thus, Pyare Lal Santoshi too was not credited in the film's opening credits for being one of the lyricists of the film.
"Dil Diya Hai Aapne Toh Meherbaani Aapki..."	Lata Mangeshkar	Raja Mehdi Ali Khan	
"Din Hai Pyare Pyare Barsaat Ke..."	Lata Mangeshkar	Raja Mehdi Ali Khan	
"Ulfat Ke Jadu Ka Dil Mein Asar Hai..."	Lata Mangeshkar, C. Ramchandra	Vrajendra Gaur	
"Kaske Kamar Ho Ja Taiyar, Karna Hoga Beda Paar..."	Lata Mangeshkar, Shamshad Begum	Vrajendra Gaur	
"Dekho Dekho Gadbad Ghotala Daal Mein Hai Kuch Kaala..."	Shamshad Begum, C. Ramchandra	Vrajendra Gaur	
"Woh Unka Muskurana Sharmaake Chale Jaana..."	Arun Kumar Mukherjee	Vrajendra Gaur	
