= Aadhi Raat =

- Directed by: S. K. Ojha
- Starring: Ashok Kumar; Nargis; Jeevan; Cuckoo; Kuldip Kaur
- Music by: Husnlal Bhagatram
- Release date: 1950
- Country: India
- Language: Hindi

Aadhi Raat is an Indian Hindi-language film of 1950, directed by S. K. Ojha and starring Ashok Kumar, Nargis, Jeevan, Cuckoo, Kuldip Kaur, Neelam and Tiwari. The music was composed by Husnlal Bhagatram, while Geeta Dutt, Lata Mangeshkar and Meena Kapoor were the playback singers.

== Cast ==
- Ashok Kumar
- Nargis
- Jeevan
- Kuldip Kaur
- Cuckoo Moray
- Neelam
- Ramayan Tiwari

== Soundtrack ==
1. "Hume Duniya ko Dil ke jakhm" – Lata Mangeshkar, Mohammed Rafi
2. "Maine Balam Se" – Geeta Dutt, Meena Kapoor
3. "Rona Hi Likja Tha" – Lata Mangeshkar
4. "Dil Hi To Hai" – Lata Mangeshkar
5. "Idhar To Aao" – Lata Mangeshkar
6. "Banke Suhagan" – Lata Mangeshkar
7. "Dil Zakhmon Se Chu" – Mohammed Rafi, Geeta Dutt
8. "Aayi Suhani Raat" – Lata Mangeshkar
9. "Lo Jawani Ka Zamana" – Meena Kapoor
