= Samadhi (1950 film) =

- Directed by: Ramesh Saigal
- Written by: Qamar Jalalabadi
- Screenplay by: Ramesh Saigal
- Produced by: Filmistan Ltd.
- Starring: Ashok Kumar; Nalini Jaywant; Kuldip Kaur
- Cinematography: K. H. Kapadia
- Edited by: D. N. Pai (Supervising); Babu
- Music by: C. Ramchandra
- Production company: Filmistan
- Distributed by: Filmistan
- Release date: 1950
- Running time: 156 mins
- Country: lIndia
- Language: Hindi

Samadhi is a 1950 Indian Hindi-language spy film directed by Ramesh Saigal. A box office success, the film was the highest earning film of 1950, earning an approximate gross of Rs. 1,35,00,000 and a net of Rs. 75,00,000.

== Plot ==
Subhas Chandra Bose gives a call to the youth to join his Indian National Army (INA) to liberate India from the British. While in Malaya, Bose raises money by auctioning his garland. Young Shekhar buys it, and is so impressed that he also joins the INA. Significantly, he has a blind father Badri Prasad, and a young brother, Pratap whom he leaves alone.

This is not liked by his elder brother Suresh, who is an officer in the British Indian Army. Suresh is in love with Dolly D'Souza, who poses as a singer, but actually is a British spy. Dolly has a younger sister, Lily. Shekhar falls in love with Lily, when he watches the sisters dance to the memorable “Gore Gore O Banke Chore”.

== Cast ==
- Ashok Kumar as Shekhar
- Nalini Jaywant as Lily D'Souza
- Kuldip Kaur as Dolly D'Souza
- Shyam as Suresh
- Mubarak as Boss
- S. L. Puri
- Badri Prasad as Ram Prasad
- Shashi Kapoor as Pratap
- N. Kabir
- Collins as "Netaji" Subhas Chandra Bose

== Soundtrack ==
Lyrics were written by Rajinder Krishan. The song "Gore Gore O Banke Chore" is based on "Chico Chico from Puerto Rico" from the 1945 American film Doll Face.

Song	Singer
"Gore Gore O Banke Chore, Kabhi Meri Gali Aaya Karo"	Amirbai Karnataki, Lata Mangeshkar
"Woh Paas Aa Rahe Hai"	Lata Mangeshkar
"Abhi Shaam Aayegi"	Lata Mangeshkar
"Idhar Mohabbat"	Shamshad Begum
"Netaji Ka Jeevan Hai"	C. Ramchandra
"Kadam Kadam Badhaye Ja"	C. Ramchandra
