= Nalini Jaywant =

Indian actress (1926–2010)

- Jaywant in Aankh Michouli (1942)
- Born: 18 February 1926; Bombay, British India
- Died: 22 December 2010 (aged 84); Mumbai, Maharashtra, India
- Occupations: Actress; playback singer
- Years active: 1941–1966; 1980–1983
- Spouses: V. C. Desai (m. 1943; sep. 1948) Prabhu Dayal (m. 1960; died 2001)
- Relatives: Samarth family

Nalini Jaywant (18 February 1926 – 22 December 2010) was an Indian actress who worked predominantly in Hindi cinema. A member of the Samarth family, she made her screen debut as a teenager in V. C. Desai's Radhika (1941) and gained prominence for her performance as an orphan who becomes the subject of her brother's obsession in Bahen (1941). Jaywant withdrew from films following her marriage to Desai in 1943 and returned to cinema after their separation in the late 1940s. Her collaborations with actor Ashok Kumar on the 1950 hits Samadhi and Sangram established her as a leading actress of the decade.

Appearing in over 60 films, Jaywant found commercial success in films including Anokha Pyar (1948), Aankhen (1950), Jadoo (1951), Nastik (1954), Munimji (1955), and Ham Sab Chor Hain (1956), while receiving critical recognition for her performances in K. A. Abbas's Rahi (1952), Ramesh Saigal's Shikast (1953), Bimal Roy's Baap Beti (1954), and Zia Sarhadi's Aawaz (1956). Jaywant's best-known performance was in Raj Khosla's thriller Kala Pani (1958), in which she played Kishori, a dancer who becomes a key witness in a murder investigation. She won the Filmfare Award for Best Supporting Actress for the role.

Following her marriage to actor Prabhu Dayal, Jaywant starred in his directorial venture Amar Rahe Yeh Pyar (1961), which was unsuccessful at the box office. Her film appearances subsequently became sporadic, although she returned to the screen in Bandish (1980) and later played Amitabh Bachchan's mother in Nastik (1983), her final film role. In 2005, she received the Dadasaheb Phalke Academy Lifetime Achievement Award. (Note: Not to be confused with the government-conferred Dadasaheb Phalke Award.) She largely withdrew from public life thereafter and died in 2010.

== Early life and career ==
Nalini Jaywant was born in Bombay on 18 February 1926 into a Maharashtrian household. Her father, Purushottam Jaywant, was a customs officer. Her paternal aunt was actress and singer Rattan Bai, whose daughter Shobhna Samarth established herself as a leading lady in the 1930s Hindi cinema. Jaywant was an avid movie viewer from childhood and developed an interest in drama and dancing. At the age of six, she sang for a children's programme on All India Radio. Four years later, she played the heroine in Rabindranath Tagore's play Shrimatiji, which was a success.

=== Early films and breakthrough (1940s) ===
At the birthday party of her niece Nutan (Samarth's daughter), the 13-year-old Jaywant met filmmaker V. C. Desai, who decided to launch her as an actress. Her conservative father initially objected to her working in films but eventually relented after Desai persuaded him. Jaywant made her screen debut in Desai's production Radhika (1941), produced under the banner of National Studios, which was a critical and commercial success. She subsequently appeared in Nirdosh (1941) and Aankh Michouli (1942); according to journalist Asjad Nazir, these films established her as "Bollywood's brightest new star".

Jaywant in a scene from Bahen (1941)

Jaywant gained more prominence after working with director Mehboob Khan in his drama Bahen (1941), which centres on a brother's obsessive attachment to his younger sister. She also sang for herself in the film, including the popular duet "Nahin Khate Hain Bhaiyya Mere Paan" with Sheikh Mukhtar, who played her brother. In 1943, Jaywant married Desai, but the union was not accepted by his family, and he was disowned by his father who helmed the National Studios. The couple subsequently sought employment at Filmistan. Despite receiving a monthly salary during her stint at the studio, Jaywant was not given any acting roles for a period.

Jaywant returned to films in 1948, appearing in Desai's Gunjan, which failed at the box office. She also starred in the Gujarati film Varasdar and alongside Nargis and Dilip Kumar in Anokha Pyar, in which she played a gardener's daughter. Anokha Pyar marked a breakthrough in her career.

=== Established actress (1950s) ===
A turning point came in 1950, when Jaywant co-starred with Ashok Kumar in the box-office hits Samadhi and Sangram. In Samadhi, she played Lily, a Westernized young woman who becomes involved in an espionage plot through her sister Dolly (Kuldip Kaur). Although critic Baburao Patel dismissed the film as "politically obsolete" because of its pre-independence themes, Samadhi proved significantly popular with audiences. Jaywant and Kumar subsequently appeared together in Jalpari (1952), Kafila (1952), Nau Bahar (1952), Saloni (1952), Lakirein (1954), Naaz (1954), Sheroo (1957) and Mr. X (1957).

Jaywant's 1952 bilingual release, K. A. Abbas' Rahi, starred her as Ganga, an oppressed tea plantation worker who helps reform her lover (Dev Anand)

In the early 1950s, Jaywant had further commercial successes with Aankhen (1950) and Jadoo (1951), while receiving critical recognition for her performances in K. A. Abbas' Rahi and Ramesh Saigal's Shikast (both 1953). In Rahi, an adaptation of Mulk Raj Anand's novel Two Leaves and a Bud, she played Ganga, an oppressed tea plantation worker who helps reform her lover, played by Dev Anand. The film was made simultaneously in English and was released in the Soviet Union in a Russian-dubbed version titled Ganga. Shikast depicted an ill-fated romance between Jaywant's and Dilip Kumar's characters. Her 1953 releases had minimal returns at the box office.

In 1954, Jaywant starred in Bimal Roy's Baap Beti, as well as in I. S. Johar's Nastik, one of the year's biggest box-office hits. She also headlined Debaki Bose's remake Kavi (1954) alongside Geeta Bali and Bharat Bhushan. The following year, Jaywant starred opposite Anand in Munimji (1955), playing Roopa, a haughty woman courted by Anand's character while being betrothed to another man. She also appeared with newcomer Sunil Dutt in Railway Platform (1955) and with Shammi Kapoor in Ham Sab Chor Hain (1956). In Aawaz, described as Zia Sarhadi's best-known melodrama, Jaywant played a wife who dies by suicide after being raped by a moneylender.

Critic Dinesh Raheja hailed her performance in the Raj Khosla thriller Kala Pani (1958) as "arguably Nalini's most realised performance ever". She played Kishori, a dancer who becomes a key witness in a murder case. According to scholars Ashish Rajadhyaksha and Paul Willemen, Jaywant "elevates the film beyond its plot" through her acting and dance performance. Kala Pani was among the highest-grossing Indian films of 1958 and earned Jaywant the Filmfare Award for Best Supporting Actress.

=== Later work ===
In 1961, Jaywant starred in the Partition drama Amar Rahe Yeh Pyar, directed by her husband Prabhu Dayal. The film was unsuccessful at the box office, and its co-producer Radha Kishan subsequently died by suicide. Jaywant was deeply affected by the incident and began reducing her workload. Her last film released in the 1960s was Toofan Mein Pyar Kahan (1966).

Jaywant returned to the screen in Bandish (1980), followed by the Amitabh Bachchan-starrer Nastik (1983). Despite the film's commercial success, she was dissatisfied with the limited scope of her role in Nastik and decided to end her acting career.

== Personal life and death ==
In 1943, Jaywant married Gujarati filmmaker V. C. Desai, who was several years her senior. They separated in late 1948 and divorced in 1954; she alleged infidelity on his part. According to journalist Asjad Nazir, in the 1950s, Jaywant had an affair with her frequent co-star Ashok Kumar, but ended it because Kumar was unwilling to leave his wife. Jaywant regarded Kumar as her favourite co-star, praising his body language and "expressive eyes".

Jaywant married Punjabi actor Prabhu Dayal in 1960. Following her reduced film work in the 1960s, she largely withdrew from the industry. She had no children. Dayal died in 2001, after which Jaywant lived alone at her bungalow in Union Park, Chembur, Mumbai, and became increasingly reclusive.

In 2005, Jaywant was honoured with a Lifetime Achievement Award by the Dadasaheb Phalke Academy. Subsequently in 2009, journalist Roshmila Bhattacharya visited Jaywant while attempting to invite her to present Ashok Kumar with a Lifetime Achievement Award. Bhattacharya later described Jaywant as the "desi Garbo", recalling that she initially reacted warily upon learning that her visitor was a journalist. Jaywant received the invitation but did not attend the ceremony.

Jaywant died of a heart attack on 22 December 2010. Her death went unnoticed for three days, after which her body was discovered when an ambulance arrived to remove it. A distant relative subsequently claimed her body and performed her funeral.

== Acting style and reception ==
In the book Star-Portrait (1962), the authors Harish Booch and Karing Doyle noted Jaywant's successful return to prominence after her prolonged absence from films in the mid-1940s, describing her career as a challenge to conventional assumptions about actresses' ability to regain popularity after extended periods away from the screen. According to scholars Ashish Rajadhyaksha and Paul Willemen, Jaywant displayed versatility between realistic melodrama and more performative musical roles. They described her style in films such as Kala Pani (1958) as "autonomous" and "guilt-free", while noting her contrasting musical persona in films such as Jadoo, Naujawan (both 1951) and Munimji (1955).

Jaywant was noted for the spontaneity of her performances. Her Shikast co-actor Dilip Kumar regarded her as a "formidable costar" and recalled that she was "the only actress who could take me by surprise in the final take", attributing this to her "natural spontaneity". Jaywant herself expressed frustration at the limited opportunities she received to "do full justice to [her] acting prowess". In a 1962 discussion of acting technique, she argued that Indian actors could perform on a par with Hollywood actors if they were given film scripts sufficiently in advance to study their roles. She also believed that a degree of overacting was necessary in Indian films because of the tastes of their predominantly illiterate audience.

Jaywant's contemporary public image also reflected her popularity: in a 1952 Filmfare poll of film cameramen, she was voted the "most photogenic Indian actress ever". Around this time, Jaywant, as well as Madhubala and Begum Para, were extensively photographed by American photojournalist James Cobb Burke for a part of a proposed Life magazine feature on Asian film actresses, titled "Movie Queens".

Reporting on her death, The Times of India journalist Radha Rajadhyaksha noted that Jaywant had preceded better-known actresses such as Madhubala, Nutan, Waheeda Rehman and Vyjayanthimala by several years, and described her as "a big marquee name of cinema's golden era" for film buffs and connoisseurs. In 2023, journalist Asjad Nazir of Eastern Eye described Jaywant as "one of the most influential stars in Hindi cinema history", crediting her with inspiring later leading actresses through her acting, style and screen presence.

== List of works ==
=== Filmography ===
Year	Film	Role	Songs she sung for herself	Notes
1941	Radhika		No	Debut film; directed by 1st husband Virendra Desai.
1941	Bahen	Beena	4	
1941	Nirdosh		6	Bilingual film (Hindi and Marathi); directed by 1st husband Virendra Desai.
1942	Ankh Michowli		7	
1943	Adab Arz		4	Directed by 1st husband Virendra Desai.
1946	Phir Bhi Apna Hai		No	
1948	Anokha Pyar	Bindiya	No	
1948	Gunjan		6	Directed by 1st husband Virendra Desai.
1948	Varasdar	Neela	5	Gujarati film
1949	Chakori		1	
1950	Aankhen		No	
1950	Hindustan Hamara		2	
1950	Muqaddar		3	
1950	Samadhi	Lilly	No	
1950	Sangram	Kanta	No	
1951	Bhai Ka Pyar		No	Re-released version of Phir Bhi Apna Hai (1946) under a different title
1951	Ek Nazar	Chitra	No	
1951	Jadoo	Sundari	No	
1951	Nand Kishore		No	Bilingual film (Hindi and Marathi)
1951	Naujawan	Kamala	No	
1952	Doraha		No	
1952	Jalpari		No	
1952	Kafila		No	
1952	Nau Bahar	Jamuna alias Rani alias Kiran	No	
1952	Saloni		No	
1953	Rahi	Ganga	No	Bilingual film (Hindi and English); released in English as The Wayfarer (1953).
1953	Shikast	Sushma	No	
1954	Baap Beti		No	
1954	Kavi		No	
1954	Lakirein		No	
1954	Mehbooba		No	
1954	Naaz		No	
1954	Nastik	Rama	No	Dubbed and released in Tamil as Madadhipathi Magal (1962).
1955	Chingari		1	
1955	Jai Mahadev		No	
1955	Lagan		No	
1955	Munimji	Roopa	No	
1955	Railway Platform	Naina	No	
1955	Rajkanya		No	
1956	26 January		No	
1956	Aan Baan		No	
1956	Aawaz	Jamuna	No	
1956	Bhaarti		No	
1956	Durgesh Nandini	Ayesha Banu	No	
1956	Fifty Fifty		No	
1956	Ham Sab Chor Hain	Bimala	No	
1956	Insaaf		No	
1956	Sudarshan Chakra		No	
1957	Kitna Badal Gaya Insaan		No	
1957	Miss Bombay		No	
1957	Mr. X	Chhaya	No	
1957	Neelmani		No	
1957	Rani Rupmati		No	
1957	Sheroo		No	
1958	Kala Pani	Kishori	No	
1958	Milan		No	
1959	Maa Ke Aansoo		No	
1960	Mukti		No	
1961	Amar Rahe Yeh Pyar	Geeta	No	
1961	Senapati		No	
1962	Girls Hostel		No	
1962	Zindagi Aur Hum		No	
1965	Bombay Race Course		No	
1966	Toofan Mein Pyar Kahan	Shanta	No	
1980	Bandish	Ratnabai	No	
1983	Nastik	Shankar's mother	No	Last film & role

=== Discography ===
Year	Film	Song	Co-singer (if any)	Lyricist	Music Director(s)	Language
1941	Bahen	"Nahin Khaate Hain Bhaiya Mere Paan..."	Sheikh Mukhtar	Wajahat Hussain Mirza Changezi	Anil Krishna Biswas	Hindi
1941	Bahen	"Aayi Jawani Jiya Lehraye..."	Sheikh Mukhtar	Dr. Safdar 'Aah' Sitapuri	Anil Krishna Biswas	Hindi
1941	Bahen	"Mohe Le Chal Apni Nagariya..."	Husn Bano	Dr. Safdar 'Aah' Sitapuri	Anil Krishna Biswas	Hindi
1941	Bahen	"Hawa Basant Ki Dol Rahi Hai..."	Harish	Dr. Safdar 'Aah' Sitapuri	Anil Krishna Biswas	Hindi
1941	Nirdosh	"Gulnaaron Mein Radha Pyari Base..."	No	Kanhaiya Lal Chaturvedi	Ashok Ghosh	Hindi
1941	Nirdosh	"Dahi Le Lo..."	No	Kanhaiya Lal Chaturvedi	Ashok Ghosh	Hindi
1941	Nirdosh	"Baaje Damroo Har Kar..."	No	(traditional)	Ashok Ghosh	Hindi
1941	Nirdosh	"Prem Sapan Ban Nachoon..."	No	Neelkanth Tiwari	Ashok Ghosh	Hindi
1941	Nirdosh	"Main Hoon Pari Main Hoon Pari, Ban Ki Pari Ban Ki Pari..."	Mukesh Chand Mathur	Neelkanth Tiwari	Ashok Ghosh	Hindi
1941	Nirdosh	"Tum Hi Ne Mujhko Prem Sikhaya..."	Mukesh Chand Mathur	Zia Sarhadi	Ashok Ghosh	Hindi
1942	Ankh Michowli	"Jag Mein Kiska Prem Bada Hai..."	No	Satyakam Sharma	Gyan Dutt	Hindi
1942	Ankh Michowli	"Dekho Ji Na Chhedo..."	No	Shatir Ghazanavi	Gyan Dutt	Hindi
1942	Ankh Michowli	"Ankh Michowli Ankh Michowli Aao Sakhi Khelen..."	Rajkumari Dubey	Shatir Ghazanavi	Gyan Dutt	Hindi
1942	Ankh Michowli	"Na Haan Kaho Na Naa Kaho..."	Satish	Indra Chandra	Gyan Dutt	Hindi
1942	Ankh Michowli	"Ae Ri Maai Maai Ri Mere Babul Se..."	No	Indra Chandra	Gyan Dutt	Hindi
1942	Ankh Michowli	"Main Toh Bade Baap Ki Beti Re..."	No	Indra Chandra	Gyan Dutt	Hindi
1942	Ankh Michowli	"Kaun Jaane Re Meri Nathani Ka Mol..."	No	Indra Chandra	Gyan Dutt	Hindi
1943	Adab Arz	"Hariyala Banna Ho Bhai..."	No	Indra Chandra	Gyan Dutt	Hindi
1943	Adab Arz	"Zara Dheere Se Chhed Balam..."	Leela Sawant	Indra Chandra	Gyan Dutt	Hindi
1943	Adab Arz	"Kehta Hai Dil Yeh Baar Baar..."	No	Kailash Matwala	Gyan Dutt	Hindi
1943	Adab Arz	"Kheton Pe Chale Bhaiya Kisaan Re..."	No	Rammurti Chaturvedi	Gyan Dutt	Hindi
1948	Varasdar	"Ek Hato Raja Ne Ek Hati Rani..."	Harsukh Kikani		Avinash Anandrai Vyas	Gujarati
1948	Varasdar	"Aayo Hu Bangdivalo, Rang Rangeeli Bangdino..."	Geeta Dutt		Avinash Anandrai Vyas	Gujarati
1948	Varasdar	"Hu Shu Karu ? Koi Kalju Lay Jay Che..."	No		Avinash Anandrai Vyas	Gujarati
1948	Varasdar	"Aaj Sakhi Ursagar Aare Utarta Pani..."	No		Avinash Anandrai Vyas	Gujarati
1948	Varasdar	"Taare Thaavu Kaya Morlani Dhel ?"	No	Avinash Anandrai Vyas	Avinash Anandrai Vyas	Gujarati
1948	Gunjan	"Kali Khili Muskaayi, Main Toh Mann Hi Mann Sharmaayi..."	No	Vrajendra Gaur	Ashok Ghosh	Hindi
1948	Gunjan	"Kiska Saath Nibhaoon..."	No	Vrajendra Gaur	Ashok Ghosh	Hindi
1948	Gunjan	"Aayi Nayi Bahaar Nayi Umangen Nayi Tarangen..."	No	Shri Ram Chopra 'Saaz'	Ashok Ghosh	Hindi
1948	Gunjan	"Jal Barsaaye Nainwa Mann Min Kaisi Aag Lagi..."	No	Shri Ram Chopra 'Saaz'	Ashok Ghosh	Hindi
1948	Gunjan	"Rote Huye Ko Aur Rulata Hai Zamana..."	No	Shri Ram Chopra 'Saaz'	Ashok Ghosh	Hindi
1948	Gunjan	"Soyi Hain Umange Sone De..."	No	Shri Ram Chopra 'Saaz'	Ashok Ghosh	Hindi
1950	Hindustan Hamara	"Rakhti Hoon Main Pyaar Tera..."	No	Shri Ram Chopra 'Saaz'	Vasant Desai	Hindi
1950	Hindustan Hamara	"O Ji Teri Chitthiyon Se Sharmaoon Bas Choom Choom Rah Jaaoon..."	Balakram	Shri Ram Chopra 'Saaz'	Vasant Desai	Hindi
1950	Muqaddar	"Aahe Bhar Bhar Ke Tujhe Yaad Kiya Karti Hoon..."	No	Raja Mehdi Ali Khan	Khemchand Prakash & Bhola Shreshtha	Hindi
1950	Muqaddar	"Dekh Gagan Mein Kaali Ghata Kya Kahti Hai..."	No	Raja Mehdi Ali Khan	Khemchand Prakash & Bhola Shreshtha	Hindi
1950	Muqaddar	"Jab Nainon Mein Koi Aan Base..."	No	Raja Mehdi Ali Khan	Khemchand Prakash & Bhola Shreshtha	Hindi
1955	Chingari	"Manzil Pe Pahuchna Ab Dushwaar Hamara Hai..."	No	Anjum	Manohar Lal Sonik	Hindi

== Awards and honours ==
Year	Award	Category	Work	Ref.
1959	6th Filmfare Awards	Best Supporting Actress	Kala Pani (1958)	
2005	Dadasaheb Phalke Academy Award	Lifetime Achievement Award		
