= Anil Biswas (composer) =

Indian film music director and playback singer

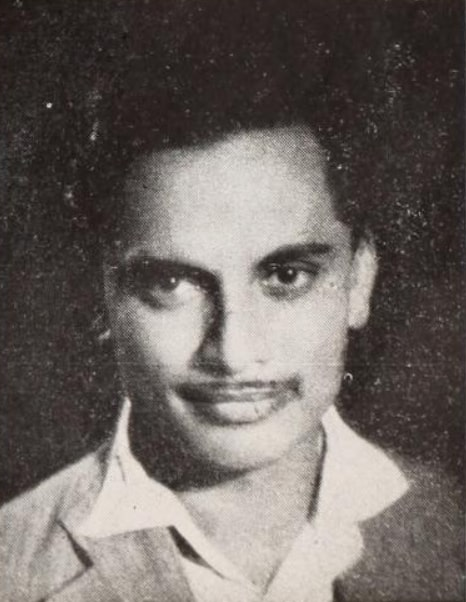
- Biswas in November 1945
- Born: Anil Krishna Biswas; 7 July 1914; Barisal, Bengal Presidency, British India (now in Bangladesh)
- Died: 31 May 2003 (aged 88); New Delhi, India
- Occupations: music composer, playback singer, actor
- Years active: 1932–1975
- Spouses: Ashalata Biswas (m. 1936; div. 1954) Meena Kapoor (m. 1957)
- Relatives: Parul Ghosh (sister); Pannalal Ghosh (brother-in-law); Paromita Vohra (granddaughter)

Chander ashay nibhayechhilam by Manna Dey
Lyricist Anil Biswas, composer and artist Manna Dey

Anil Krishna Biswas (7 July 1914 – 31 May 2003), professionally known as Anil Biswas, was an Indian film music director and playback singer from 1935 to 1965, who apart from being one of pioneers of playback singing, is also credited for the first Indian orchestra of twelve pieces and introducing orchestral music and full-blooded choral effects, into Indian cinema. A master in western symphonic music was known for the Indian classical or folk elements, especially Baul and Bhatiyali in his music. The most notable of the over 90 films he composed music for were: Roti (1942), Kismet (1943), Anokha Pyar (1948), Tarana (1951), Waris (1954), Pardesi (1957) and Char Dil Char Rahen (1959).

He was also a pioneer in using the counter melody in film scores, employing technique of western music, ‘cantala’, where one line overlaps the other in contra-melody, recitative prose songs as in Roti (1942), besides he was the first one to start extensively using the Ragmala. Another important element that he introduced was western orchestration, using indigenous instruments both in the songs as well as in their melodic interludes, a trend that soon caught on and paved way for the musicals of Indian cinema today.

He was awarded the Sangeet Natak Akademi Award in 1986, given by the Sangeet Natak Akademi, India's National Academy of Music, Dance & Drama.

== Biography ==
=== Early life ===
Anil Krishna Biswas was born on 7 July 1914, in a small village of Barisal District in East Bengal (now in Bangladesh) in the household of J C Biswas, where at a young age he acted in a local amateur theater as a child star. He was fond of listening to music since his childhood. As he grew up, he displayed considerable musical talent, by 14 he was already accomplished in playing tabla, while singing and composing music at local music concerts; though soon he joined the Indian Independence Movement, while still doing his matriculation, and was repeatedly jailed for his revolutionary activities, leading to repeated disruption of his studies. Eventually in 1930, after his father's death he left for Calcutta in disguise to escape further arrest.

=== Career ===
Anil Biswas first made name in Kolkata in the early 1930s, composing music for plays, later he joined 'Rangmahal Theatre', Kolkata, as an actor, singer, and assistant music director, 1932–34, during this period he sang and acted in several commercial stage productions. By this time he had masters singing styles like, khayal, thumri and dadra, and had become an accomplished singer of devotional music, in Shyama Sangeet and Kirtan styles.

He also worked as a singer, lyricist and composer, with the 'Hindustan Recording Company', where Kundan Lal Saigal and Sachin Dev Burman worked, before migrating to Bombay themselves. He got assignments from renowned Bengali poet, Kazi Nazrul Islam, all this got him into the notice of music director, Hiren Bose, and at whose behest he made his way to Bombay (Mumbai) in 1934.

This was the period when playback singing was making its debut in Indian cinema, when Anil first joined Ram Daryani's, 'Eastern Art Syndicate', and was associated in composing music for 'Baal Hatya' and 'Bharat ki Beti', before making his debut as a film composer, with Dharam ki Devi (1935) for which he composed the background music, and also acted and sang the song, Kuch Bhi Nahin Bharosa.. In 1936 he joined 'Sagar Movietones' as a composer, first starting with assisting composers, Ashok Ghosh in films Manmohan and Deccan Queen and also Pransukh Nayak, and continued with Sagar Movietones, even after it merged with the Yusuf Fazalbhoy of RCA's newly established National Studios in 1939.

In the coming two years he did eleven films, mostly stunt films, until Mehboob Khan's Jagirdar (1937), a commercially hit, established him as a musical force in the film industry. Soon many more independent assignments came his way, most notably, 300 Days and After, Gramophone Singer, Hum Tum Aur Woh, Ek Hi Raasta, and Mehboob Khan's Watan (1938), Alibaba (1940), the classic, Aurat (1940), Bahen (1941), before working with him again, in Roti (1942), for which he also credited with the story and concept, and which featured many songs by film's actress, Akhtaribai Faizabadi (Begum Akhtar), though they were deleted due to a contractual conflict (the music was recorded with His Master's Voice, while she was in contract with Megaphone Gramophone Company). In following years he gave scores for Bombay Talkies films like Jwar Bhata (1944), Dilip Kumar’s debut film, and Milan (1946) also starring Dilip Kumar and directed by Nitin Bose, who made it in Bengali, as Naukadubi.

He gave break to famed playback singer, Mukesh in Pehli Nazar (1945), singing 'Dil Jalta Hai to Jalne De', and to Talat Mahmood in Arzoo (1949), singing 'Aye Dil Mujhe Aisi Jagah Ley Chal' his first song in Bombay; he was also behind the success of many singers such as Surendranath, Parul Ghosh, Amirbai Karnataki, Lata Mangeshkar and Roshan Ara Begum. It was during his period that he married Ashalata, an actress with Sagar Movietones under her maiden name Mehrunnisa who continued to act under the name Ashalata Biswas, and had three sons and a daughter, the couple later divorced. Later it was the death of his son Pradeep in an airplane accident, in 1961, which catapulted his exit from the film industry. Lata Mangeshkar has admitted that Anil Biswas gave her tips and trained her for breathing control during recording songs.

In 1942, he joined Bombay Talkies at an offer from Devika Rani, where he got his biggest hit, Gyan Mukherjee's Kismet (1943), starring Ashok Kumar and Mumtaz Shanti, most remembered for the song, 'Papihaare', sung by his sister Parul Ghosh (wife of the renowned flautist, Pannalal Ghosh), the patriotic hit, 'Door hato ai duniyaa waalo', and 'Dheere dheere aare badal, mera bulbul so raha hai, shorgul na macha' sung by the actor, Ashok Kumar. In 1946, he left Bombay Talkies and set out as a freelancer, and later under the banner, ‘Variety Pictures’ owned by his wife, Ashalata Biswas, worked for four films, Laadli (1949), Laajawaab (1950), Badi Bahu (1951) and Humdard (1953), with Khwaja Ahmad Abbas' movies Rahi (1952), songless Munna (1954), where he gave the background score, and Indo-Russian joint production, Nargis starrer, Pardesi (1957) and Char Dil Char Rahen (1959). By now, the kind of music perfect by Anilda, as he was now called in the industry as, was fast changing, and so he gradually grew disillusioned by the changing dynamics of the film industry. In early 1960s, he retired from the cinema, while still at the peak of his game, he shifted base to New Delhi, though he did one or two films in between like Mahesh Kaul's, Sautela Bhai (1962), his final film as a composer was, actor Motilal's directorial venture, Chhoti Chhoti Baatein (1965), starring Nadira and with Mukesh's 'Zindagi Khwab Hai Tha Hamein Bhi'. Motilal died before its release, and the film flopped at the box office, though it did get a National Film Award.

In Delhi, he became director of the National Orchestra at the All India Radio (AIR) in March 1963, and remained Chief Producer -Sugam Sangeet (light Hindustani classical music) at AIR, Delhi till 1975. Though later, he composed music for Doordarshan's pioneering TV series Hum Log (1984) and a number of documentaries for the Films Division as late as 1991, and remained the Advisor (Music) in the rank of a Professor at Jawaharlal Nehru University for 2 years. He won the Sangeet Natak Akademi Award in 1986.

== Personal life ==
Biswas was first married for love, and much against the wishes of his own family, a Muslim actress who was four years older than him. This was Mehrunnisa (born 17 October 1910, died 1992), who had adopted the screen-name Ashalata for work purposes. Upon her marriage, Mehrunnisa assumed the name Ashalata Biswas as her one and only name. Ashalata worked as an actress during the 1930s and 1940s, a period during which acting in films was considered disreputable and few women entered the industry; she also owned Variety Pictures, a film-making company. The couple became the parents of three sons and a daughter, named Pradeep, Amit, Utpal and Shikha. Their eldest son Pradeep died young in a plane crash in 1961. Their other son, Utpal Biswas, also worked as a music composer, as part of the Amar-Uptal duo team which composed the music for a few films including Shahenshah (1988) and Main Azaad Hoon (1989). Biswas's daughter, Shikha Vohra, is the mother of the well-known documentary film maker, Paromita Vohra. Biswas and Ashalata were divorced in 1954; Ashalata Biswas died in 1992.

On 19 March 1957, three years after his divorce, Anil Biwas married the playback singer, Meena Kapoor, daughter of actor Bikram Kapoor, whom he first met during the recording of the songs of Anokha Pyar (1948). Meena Kapoor did not have any children. Meena was most noted for singing hit 1950s songs like, "Rasiya Re Man Basiya Re" in Nargis starrer Pardesi (1957) and "Kachchi Hai Umariya" picturised on Meena Kumari in Char Dil Char Rahen (1959).

Anil Biswas died in New Delhi on 31 May 2003. He was survived by his wife Meena Kapoor, sons Amit Biswas and Utpal Biswas, and daughter Shikha Vohra, his son Pradeep Biswas having predeceased him. Upon his death, the then Prime Minister of India, Atal Bihari Vajpayee called him, “a doyen of film music who struck the rare balance between classical purity of music and popular pulse”, and credited him for leaving, “an enduring legacy as he introduced many talented singers and innovations to the Indian film music.”

== Filmography ==
- Dharam Ki Devi (1935)
- Fida-e-Vatan (alias Tasveer-e-vafa) (1935, co-composer with Jhande Khan)
- Piya Ki Jogan (alias Purchased Bride)
- Pratima (alias Prem Murti)
- Prem Bandhan (alias Victims of Love) (1936, co-composer with Jhande Khan)
- Sangdil Samaj
- Sher Ka Panja
- Shokh Dilruba (1936, with Sunder Daas)
- Bulldog (1936)
- Dukhiari (alias A Tale of Selfless Love) (1936, with Madhulal Damodar Master)
- Gentleman Daku (1937)
- Jagirdar (1937)
- Kokila (1937)
- Mahageet (1937)
- Watan (1938)
- Teen Sau Din Ke Baad (1938)
- Hum Tum Aur Woh (1938)
- Gramophone Singer (1938)
- Dynamite (1938)
- Abhilasha (1938)
- Jeevan Saathi (1939)
- Ek Hi Raasta (1939)
- Pooja (1940)
- Aurat (1940)
- Alibaba (1940/I)
- Apna Paraya (1941)
- Bahen (1941)
- Aasra (1941)
- Vijay (1942)
- Jawani (1942)
- Kismet (1943)
- Hamari Baat (1943)
- Jwar Bhata (1944)
- Pahali Nazar (1945)
- Bhookh (1947)
- Manjhdhar (1947)
- Veena (1948)
- Gajre (1948)
- Anokha Pyar (1948)
- Ladli (1949)
- Jeet (1949)
- Girls' School (1949)
- Beqasoor (1950)
- Arzoo (1950)
- Lajawab (1950)
- Badi Bahu (1951)
- Tarana (1951)
- Do Sitare (1951)
- Aaram (1951)
- Do Raha (1952)
- Rahi (1952)
- Mehmaan (1953)
- Jallianwalla Baag Ki Jyoti (1953)
- Fareb (1953)
- Akash (1953)
- Waris (1954)
- Naaz (1954)
- Mahatma Kabir (1954)
- Maan (1954)
- Jasoos (1957)
- Jalti Nishani (1955)
- Faraar (1955)
- Du-janay (1955)
- Paisa Hi Paisa (1956)
- Heer (1956)
- Pardesi (1957)
- Abhimaan (1957)
- Sanskar (1958)
- Char Dil Char Raahein (1959)
- Return of Mr. Superman (alias Mr. Superman ki Wapsi) (1960)
- Angulimaal (1960)
- Sautela Bhai (1962)
- Chhoti Chhoti Baatein (1965)
