= List of Hindi films of 1956 =

A list of films produced by the Bollywood film industry based in Mumbai in 1956:

== Highest-grossing films ==
The ten highest-grossing films at the Indian box office in 1956:

Rank	Title	Gross collection
1	C.I.D.	₹2.50 crore
2	Ek Hi Raasta	₹1.95 crore
3	Chori Chori	₹1.75 crore
4	Basant Bahar	₹1.55 crore
5	New Delhi	₹1.45 crore
6	Raj Hath	₹1.35 crore
7	Bhai-Bhai	₹1.15 crore
8	Toofan Aur Diya	₹1.05 crore
9	Funtoosh	₹90 lakh
10	Inspector	₹80 lakh

== A-C ==
Title	Director	Cast	Genre	Notes
26 January	Ramesh Saigal	Ajit, Nalini Jaywant, Nishi, Johnny Walker, B. M. Vyas, Leela Mishra, Sapru, Randhir, Cuckoo, Gajanan Jagirdar, Chaman Puri, Jagdish Sethi	Fantasy Costume Drama	Music: C. Ramchandra Lyrics: Rajendra Krishan
Aabroo	Chaturbhuj Doshi	Kamini Kaushal, Kishore Kumar, Smriti Biswas, Amir Bano, Madan Puri, Achala Sachdev, Roopmala, Tun Tun, Joginder Singh Lal	Romance	Music: Bulo C. Rani Lyrics: D. N. Madhok, Gopal Singh Nepali, Raja Mehdi Ali Khan
Aan Baan	D. D. Kashyap	Ajit, Nalini Jaywant, Usha Kiran, Pran, Mahipal, Manmohan Krishna, Ulhas, Niranjan Sharma	Drama Action	Music: Husnlal Bhagatram Lyrics: Qamar Jalalabadi
Aankh Ka Nasha	Ved Madan	Anita Guha, M. Rajan, Shammi, Helen, W. M. Khan, Amar, Chaman Puri, Raj Mehra	Costume Action	Music: Dhani Ram Lyrics: Harsh
Aastik	S. P. Kalla	Shahu Modak, Paro Devi, Meenakshi, B. M. Vyas, Praveen Paul	Devotional	Music: Narayan Dutt Lyrics: S. P. Kalla
Alam Ara	Nanubhai Vakil	Daljeet, Chitra, Tiwari, Niranjan Sharma, Minu Mumtaz, W. M. Khan, Heera Sawant, Maruti, Rajan Haksar	Costume Action	Music: A. R. Qureshi Lyrics: Shewan Rizvi
Amarsingh Rathaur	Jaswant Zaveri	P. Jairaj, Nirupa Roy, Veena, Murad, Sapru, Minu Mumtaz, Ratnamala, Yashodhara Katju, Sunder, Helen	Historical	Music: Sanmukh Babu Lyrics: Bharat Vyas
Anjaan	M. Sadiq	Vyjayantimala, Pradeep Kumar, Premnath, Jeevan, Mubarak, Johnny Walker, Shammi, Amar, Helen, Raj Mehra, Ram Avtar	Romance Drama	Music: Hemant Kumar Lyrics: Rajendra Krishan
Anuraag	Madhusadan	Mukesh, Usha Kiran, Pratima Devi, Tun Tun, Shivraj, Mridula	Social	Music: Mukesh Lyrics: Indeevar, Kaif Irfani
Arab Ka Saudagar	S. D. Narang	Pradeep Kumar, Smriti Biswas, Shashikala, Sunder, Kathana, S. D. Narang	Costume Action	Music: Hemant Kumar Lyrics: S.H. Bihari, Ravi
Awara Shahzadi	Pyarelal	Meena Shorey, Daljeet, Sheila Ramani, Johnny Walker, Malika, Maqbul, Heera Sawant, Habib	Action Costume	Music: Nashad, Jimmy Lyrics: Sartaj Rahmani, Khawar Zaman
Awaz	Zia Sarhadi	Nalini Jaywant, Usha Kiran, Rajendra Kumar, Murad, Mukri, Zul Vellani, Leela Chitnis, Nazir Hussain, Jayant, Sapru	Social	Music: Salil Chowdhury Lyrics: Shailendra, Zia Sarhadi, Vishwamitra Adil, Prem Dhawan
Ayodhyapati	S. Fattelal	Usha Kiran, Abhi Bhattacharya, Anant Kumar, Achala Sachdev, Sapru, Kanchanmala, Ratnamala, Manorama	Mythology	Music: Ravi Lyrics: Saraswati Kumar Deepak
Badal Aur Bijli	Maurice	Manhar Desai, Ameeta, Yashodhara Katju, Kumar, Manorama, Anwar Hussain, Rajan Haksar, Heera Sawant, Habib	Action	Music: Bipin Babul Lyrics: Anjum Jaipuri
Badshah Salamat	Prem Sinha	Chandrashekhar, Shyama, Smriti Biswas, Bhagwan, Amarnath, Minu Mumtaz, B. M. Vyas, Tiwari, Heera Sawant, Anwar Hussain	Costume Action	Music: Bulo C. Rani Lyrics: Pyarelal Santoshi, Raja Mehdi Ali Khan, Shafiq Kanpuri, Vinay Kumar, K. Razdan
Baghdad Ka Jadu a.k.a. Magic of Baghdad	John Cawas	John Cawas, Nadia, Krishna Kumari, Vijaya Chaudhary, Nazir Kashmiri, Ratan Kumar	Action Fantasy	Music: Shafi M. Nagri Lyrics: Preetam Dehlvi
Bajrang Bali	Manibhai Vyas	Mahipal, Nirupa Roy, Chandrashekhar, Tiwari, Minu Mumtaz, Moni Chatterjee, Kammo, Kamal Kapoor	Religious	Music: S. N. Tripathi Lyrics: B. D. Mishra
Bal Ramayan	Vijay Bhatt	Shahu Modak, Shobhana Samarth, Prem Adib	Children Religious	
Bandhan	Hemchander Chander	Meena Kumari, Pradeep Kumar, Motilal, Shashikala, David, Achala Sachdev, Leela Mishra, Minu Mumtaz, Nana Palsikar, Kammo	Drama	Music: Hemant Kumar Lyrics: Rajendra Krishan
Basant Bahar	Raja Nawathe	Bharat Bhushan, Nimmi, Kumkum, Om Prakash, Manmohan Krishna, Chand Burque, Leela Chitnis	Romance Musical	Music: Shankar Jaikishan Lyrics: Shailendra and Hasrat Jaipuri
Basant Panchami	Jayant Desai	Nirupa Roy, Anant Kumar, Kumkum, Jeevan, Radhakishan, S. N. Tripathi, Niranjan Sharma, Naazi	Devotional	Music: Chitragupta Lyrics: Kavi Pradeep
Bhagam Bhag	Bhagwan	Bhagwan, Kishore Kumar, Smriti Biswas, Kumkum, Shashikala, Badri Prasad, Tiwari, Kanchanmala, Parshuram	Comedy	Music: O. P. Nayyar Lyrics: Majrooh Sultanpuri
Bhai-Bhai	M. V. Raman	Ashok Kumar, Shyama, Kishore Kumar, Nimmi, David, Om Prakash, Daisy Irani, Shivraj	Family Drama	Music: Madan Mohan Lyrics: Rajendra Krishan
C.I.D.	Raj Khosla	Dev Anand, Shakila, Johnny Walker, Introducing: Waheeda Rehman, K. N. Singh, Minu Mumtaz, Mehmood, Jagdish Raj, Tun Tun, Sheela Vaz	Crime Suspense Romance	Music: O. P. Nayyar Lyrics: Majrooh Sultanpuri
Caravan	Rafiq Rizvi	Mahipal, Shakila, Yashodra Katju, Hiralal	Action	Music: Mohinder Singh Sarna Lyrics: Tanvir Naqvi
Char Dost	Nitin Bose	Vishwanath, Kamar, Bhola, Kammo	Children	Produced by Children's Film Society. Music: B. Balsara Lyrics: Uday Khanna
Char Minar	Ravindra Dave	Nasir Khan, Bhagwan, Jabeen, Anjali Devi, Rashid Khan, Helen, Naazi	Costume Drama	Music: Sardul Kwatra Lyrics: Vishwamitra Adil
Chhoo Mantar	M. Sadiq	Johnny Walker, Karan Dewan, Shyama, Anita Guha, Gajanan Jagirdar, Amar, Raj Mehra, Nazir Kashmiri	Comedy	Music: O. P. Nayyar Lyrics: Jan Nisar Akhtar
Chori Chori	Anant Thakur	Raj Kapoor, Nargis, Pran, Johnny Walker, Gope, Bhagwan, Rajasulochana	Romantic Comedy	Music: Shankar Jaikishan won the Filmfare Award for Best Music Director. Lyrics: Shailendra and Hasrat Jaipuri

== D-I ==
Title	Director	Cast	Genre	Notes
Dashehra	Chaturbhuj Doshi	Shahu Modak, Nirupa Roy, Daisy Irani, Surendra, Yashodhra Katju, Kumkum, Tiwari, Mohan Choti, Gajanan Jagirdar, S. N. Tripathi, Jagdish Kanwal	Devotional	Music: Datta Naik Lyrics: Kavi Pradeep
Dilli Durbar	Chandrakant Desai	Sumitra, Ulhas, Rehana, Sapru, Veena, S. N. Tripathi, Tun Tun, Kammo	Costume Drama	Music: S. N. Tripathi Lyrics: Shailendra
Devta	Pattanna	Vyjayanthimala, Anjali Devi, Gemini Ganesan, Krishna Kumari, M. N. Nambiar, Daisy Irani, Agha, Bipin Gupta, Indira Bansal	Fantasy Drama	Music: C. Ramachandra Lyrics: Rajendra Krishan
Dhake Ki Malmal	J. K. Nanda	Kishore Kumar, Madhubala, Shashikala, Jagdeep, Ulhas, Jeevan, Sajjan	Social	Music: O. P. Nayyar, Robin Chatterjee Lyrics: Jan Nisar Akhtar, D. N. Madhok, Saroj Mohini Nayyar
Dhola Maru	N. R. Acharya	Pradeep Kumar, Rehana, Kumkum, Achala Sachdev, Sapru, Ulhas, Amar	Legend	Music: S. K. Pal Lyrics: Bharat Vyas
Diwali Ki Raat	Dharam Kumar	Talat Mahmood, Roopmala, Shashikala, Neeroo, Moti Sagar, Leela Mishra, Gope	Social	Music: Snehal Bhatkar Lyrics: Naqsh Lyallpuri, Pandit Phani, Madhukar Rajasthani
Durgesh Nandini	B. Mitra	Nalini Jaywant, Pradeep Kumar, Bina Rai, Ajit, Nigar Sultana, I. S. Johar, Jeevan, Sapru, Jankidas, Murad, Sheela Vaz	Costume Drama	Music: Hemant Kumar, Lyrics: Rajendra Krishan
Ek Shola	Chander Saigal	Mala Sinha, Pradeep Kumar, Shobha Khote, Leela Mishra, Nazir Hasain, Dhumal, Jawahar Kaul, Naaz	Family Drama	Music: Madan Mohan Lyrics: Majrooh Sultanpuri
Ek Hi Rasta	B. R. Chopra	Ashok Kumar, Meena Kumari, Sunil Dutt, Kumkum, Daisy Irani, Brahm Bhardwaj, Yashodra Katju, Jeevan, Nazir Kashmiri	Social Drama	Music: Hemant Kumar Lyrics: Majrooh Sultanpuri
Fifty Fifty	R. L. Malhotra	Nalini Jaywant, M. Rajan, Om Prakash, Manmohan Krishan, David, Surendra, Gope, Helen, Tun Tun, Jayant	Double role Drama	Music: Madan Mohan Lyrics: Rajendra Krishan
Fighting Queen	Nari Ghadiali	John Cawas, Nadia, Pramila, Habib, Sheikh	Action	Music: Nisar Lyrics: Saba Afghani
Funtoosh	Chetan Anand	Dev Anand, Sheila Ramani, Kumkum, Krishan Dhawan, Jagdish Raj, Leela Chitnis	Romance Comedy Drama	Music: S. D. Burman Lyrics: Sahir Ludhianvi
Gauri Puja	Vinod Desai	Abhi Bhattacharya, Nirupa Roy, Kumkum, Yashodhara Katju, Lalita Pawar, Sunder, Sulochana, Sapru	Devotional	Music: Manna Dey Lyrics: Gopal Singh Nepali
Ghulam Begum Badshah	Jugal Kishore	Daljeet, Sheila Ramani, Nishi, Johnny Walker, W. M. Khan, Malika	Action Drama	Music: Sudipt Lyrics: Indeevar, Shauqat Pardesi, Shyam Hindi
Halaku	D.D. Kashyap	Ajit, Meena Kumari, Pran, Veena, Minu Mumtaz, Sunder, Shammi, Raj Mehra, Helen	Costume Drama	Music: Shankar Jaikishan Lyrics: Shailendra, Hasrat Jaipuri
Hum Sab Chor Hain	I. S. Johar	Shammi Kapoor, Nalini Jaywant, Ameeta, I. S. Johar, Rajendra Nath, Pran, Ram Avtar, Badri Prasad, Kanu Roy	Comedy Drama	Music: O. P. Nayyar Lyrics: Majrooh Sultanpuri
Hamara Watan	Jayant Desai	Bina Rai, Premnath, Agha, Kumkum, Jagdish Kanwal, Nazir Kashmiri, S. N. Tripathi	Social	Music: Hemant Kumar Lyrics: S. H. Bihari, Raja Mehdi Ali Khan, Ravi
Hatim Tai	Homi Wadia	P. Jairaj, Shakila, Krishna Kumari, W. M. Khan, S. N. Tripathi, B. M. Vyas, Meenakshi	Fantasy	Music: S. N. Tripathi Lyrics: Raja Mehdi Ali Khan, B. D. Mishra, Akhtar Romani, Chand Pandit
Heer	Hameed Butt	Nutan, Pradeep Kumar, Krishna Kumari, Lalita Pawar, Murad, Zora Sehgal, Mubarak, Noor, Ulhas, Rashid Khan	Folklore Romance	Music: Anil Biswas Lyrics: Majrooh Sultanpuri, Rajendra Krishan
Hotel	Manmohan Sabir	Geeta Bali, P. Jairaj, Pran, Jayant, Achala Sachdev, Jankidas, Shammi, Nazir Kashmiri	Social	Music: Suresh Talwar, Shankar Dasgupta Lyrics: Khawar Zaman, Manmohan Sabir
Husn Banoo	Akkoo	Mahipal, Shakila, Hiralal, Tun Tun, Habib, Gulab, Kammo	Costume Drama	Music: Ramlal Heerapanna Lyrics: Sartaj Rahmani, Pyarelal Santoshi, Sahir Chandpuri
Inquilab	Kedar Kapoor	Shyama, Ranjan, Kuldip Kaur, Sapru, Tiwari, Helen, Sunder	Action	Music: Hansraj Behl Lyrics: Raja Mehdi Ali Khan
Insaaf	Kedar Kapoor	Nalini Jaywant, Ajit, Johnny Walker, Durga Khote, Helen, Tiwari, Kamal Kapoor	Costume Action Drama	Chitragupta Lyrics: Asad Bhopali, Hasrat Jaipuri, Anjum Jaipuri
Inspector	Shakti Samanta	Ashok Kumar, Geeta Bali, K. N. Singh, Pran, Nazir Hussain, Mukri, Achala Sachdev, Mehmood, Pratima Devi, Kammo	Crime Romance	Music: Hemant Kumar Lyrics: S. H. Bihari

== J-P ==
Title	Director	Cast	Genre	Notes
Jagte Raho	Amit Maitra, Sombhu Mitra	Raj Kapoor, Motilal, Sp. app. Nargis, Pradeep Kumar, Sumitra Devi, Smriti Biswas, Daisy Irani, Nana Palsikar	Social	Music: Salil Choudhary Lyrics: Prem Dhawan, Shailendra
Jayshree	Harsukh Jagneshwar Bhatt, Bhalchandra Shukla	Pradeep Kumar, Nimmi, Jayant, Jeevan, Lalita Pawar, Radhakrishan, Daisy Irani, Chaman Puri, Vijay Kumar	Social Drama	Music: Chitragupta Lyrics: Gopal Singh Nepali, Anjum Jaipuri
Jaldeep	Kidar Sharma	Ashok Sharma, Zeb Rehman, Mala Sinha, C. S. Dubey, Achala Sachdev	Children	Best Children's Film- International Venice Film Festival, 1957. All India Certificate for Merit as the Best Children's Film- State Awards for Film, 1960. Music: Snehal Bhatkar Lyrics: Kidar Sharma, Kaif Irfani, Himmat Rai Sharma
Jallad	Jay Bee	Veena, Nasir Khan, Munawar Sultana, Tiwari, Gope, Sheela Vaz, Heera Sawant	Action	Music: Nashad Lyrics: Jan Nisar Akhtar, Sartaj Rahmani, Khumar Barabankvi, Shewan Rizvi
Jungle Queen	Nari Ghadiali	Fearless Nadia, John Cawas, Maqbul, Habib, Heera Sawant, Sheikh	Action	Music: Nisar Bazmi Lyrics: Preetam Dehlvi
Kar Bhala	Bhagwan	Begum Para, Nasir Khan, Bhagwan, Kumkum, Pran, Shashikala, Baburao Pendharkar, Kanchanmala, Minu Mumtaz	Action	Music: Nisar Chik Choklet Lyrics: Majrooh Sultanpuri
Karwan	Rafiq Rizvi	Mahipal, Shakila, Yashodhara Katju, Gope, Cuckoo, Helen, Hiralal	Costume Drama	Music: S. Mohinder Lyrics: Tanveer Naqvi, Sarshar Sailani, Bhushan
Khul Ja Sim Sim	Nanubhai Vakil	Mahipal, Shakila, Helen, Hiralal, Krishna Kumari, Niranjan Sharma	Fantasy	Music: Hansraj Behl Lyrics: Asad Bhopali
Kismet	Nanabhai Bhatt	Nishi, Peace Kanwal, Ranjan, Tiwari, Helen, Gope, Malika, Maqbul, Cuckoo	Action	Music: Chitragupta Lyrics: Indeevar
Kismet Ka Khel	Kishore Sahu	Vyjayanthimala, Sunil Dutt, Begum Para, Yashodhara Katju, Kamaljeet, Kanchanmala, Mukri, Jagdeep, Bhudo Advani, Tun Tun, Moni Chatterjee	Social	Music: Shankar Jaikishan Lyrics: Shailendra, Hasrat Jaipuri
Lal-E-Yaman	Nanubhai Vakil	Mahipal, Anita Guha, Chitra, Daljeet, W. M. Khan, Minu Mumtaz, Helen, Hiralal	Costume Fantasy	Music: A. R. Qureshi Lyrics: Kaif Irfani, Khumar Barabankvi
Lalkaar	Nanubhai Vakil	Mahipal, Nirupa Roy, Kumkum, Krishna Kumari, Radhkrishan, W. M. Khan, Hiralal, Nalini Chonkar	Action Costume	Music: Sanmukh Babu Lyrics: Kavi Pradeep, Bharat Vyas, Pandit Madhur
Lalten	Tara Harish	Motilal, Geeta Bali, Mukri, Harish, Bhudo Advani, Mohan Choti, Kanhaiyalal, Shammi, Indira Bansal	Social Romance Lost and Found	Music: Hemant Kumar Lyrics: Indeevar, Shewan Rizvi, Kaif Irfani
Makkhee Choos	Ramchandra Thakur	Mahipal, Shyama, Bhagwan, Gope, Leela Mishra, Jeevan, Moti Sagar, Shammi	Comedy	Music: Vinod Lyrics: D. N. Madhok, Pandit Indra, Pyarelal Santoshi
Malika	Majnu	Mahipal, Shakila, Chandrashekhar, Yashodhara Katju, Om Prakash, Kumkum, Sunder, Ram Avtar	Costume	Music: Hansraj Behl Lyrics: Asad Bhopali, Tanveer Naqvi, Verma Malik
Mem Sahib	R. C. Talwar	Shammi Kapoor, Meena Kumari, Kishore Kumar, Kumkum, Mehmood, Pratima Devi. Randhir	Social	Music: Madan Mohan Lyrics: Rajendra Krishan
Mr. Chakram	S. P. Bakshi	Chandrashekhar, Shyama, Kumkum, Om Prakash, Sunder, Ranjana, Randhir		Music: Husnlal Bhagatram Lyrics: Nakshab
Mr. Lambu	N. A. Ansari	Sheikh Mukhtar, Suraiya, Kamaljit Bhagwan, Vijay Laxmi, Minu Mumtaz Helen, N. A. Ansari	Social Crime	Music: O. P. Nayyar Lyrics: Majrooh Sultanpuri, Jan Nisar Akhtar, Harsh
Naqab POsh	Ram Pahwa	Manhar Desai, Chitra, Kumkum, Gope, Maya Dass, Anwar Hussain, Bhudo Advani	Costume Thriller	Music Lyrics: Hasrat Jaipuri, Raja Mehdi Ali Khan, Munir Arzoo Kazmi, Mile Lakhnavi,
Naya Andaz	K. Amarnath	Kishore Kumar, Meena Kumari, Johnny Walker, Gope, Pran, Kumkum, Murad, Jayant, Sapru	Social Romance	Music:O. P. Nayyar Lyrics: Jan Nisar Akhtar
New Delhi	Mohan Sehgal	Kishore Kumar, Vyjayanthimala, Jabeen, Anwar Hussain, Dhumal, Nazir Hussain, Prabhu Dayal, Nana Palsikar	Family Drama	Music: Shankar Jaikishan Lyrics: Hasrat Jaipuri, Shailendra
Paisa Hi Paisa	Mehrish	Kishore Kumar, Mala Sinha, Shakila, Radhakrishan, I. S. Johar, Leela Mishra, Amar, Murad, Mukri, Zul Vellani, Husn Banu	Comedy Family	Music: Anil Biswas Lyrics: Majrooh Sultanpuri
Parivar	Asit Sen	Kishore Kumar, P. Jairaj, Usha Kiran, Durga Khote, Sajjan, Agha, Hiralal, Dhumal	Family Drama	Music: Salil Chowdhary Lyrics: Shailendra
Passing Show	Bhagwan	Chandrashekhar, Shakila, Purnima, Bhagwan, Daljeet	Action	Music: Manohar Lyrics: Prem Dhawan
Patrani	Vijay Bhatt	Vyjayanthimala, Pradeep Kumar, Shashikala, Durga Khote, Om Prakash, Jeevan, David Abraham Cheulkar, Leela Mishra, Kanchanmala, Praveen Paul, Ramesh Sinha, Krishnakant, Helen, Sheela Vaz	Costume Drama	Music: Shankar Jaikishan Lyrics: Shailendra
Pocket Maar	H. S. Rawail	Dev Anand, Geeta Bali, Nadira, Lalita Pawar, Gope, Tiwari, Bhagwan, Minu Mumtaz, Tun Tun	Social Crime	Music: Madan Mohan Lyrics: Rajendra Krishan

== R-Z ==
Title	Director	Cast	Genre	Notes
Raj Hath	Sohrab Modi	Madhubala, Pradeep Kumar, Sohrab Modi, Murad, Ulhas, Tun Tun, Jagdish Kanwal, Kammo	Costume Drama	Music: Shankar Jaikishan Lyrics: Hasrat Jaipuri, Shailendra
Raj Rani Meera	G. P. Pawar	Mahipal, Prem Adib, Sulochana, Lalita Pawar, Sapru, Tiwari, Roopmala, Moni Chatterjee	Devotional	Music: S. N. Tripathi Lyrics: B. D. Mishra
Rajdhani	Naresh Saigal	Sunil Dutt, Nimmi, Durga Khote, Purnima, Johnny Walker, Tiwari, Naaz, S. Nazir	Action	Music: Hansraj Behl Lyrics: Qamar Jalalabadi
Ram Navami	Raman Desai	Nirupa Roy, Prem Adib, Yashodra Katju, Shobha Khote, Jawahar Kaul, Ratnamala, Tiwari	Devotional	Music: Bulo C. Rani Lyrics: Kavi Pradeep
Ramshastri Ka Nyay	Vishram Bedekar		Biography	
Rangeen Raten	Kedar Sharma	Shammi Kapoor, Mala Sinha, Geeta Bali, Chand Usmani, Shammi, Pesi Patel, Paro Devi	Romance Drama	Music: Roshan Lyrics: Kedar Sharma
Roop Kumari	Manibhai Vyas	Mahipal, Chandrashekhar, Shakila, Krishna Kumari, Moni Chatterjee, Jankidas, Ratnamala, Tiwari	Costume	Music: S. N. Tripathi Lyrics: B. D. Mishra
Sailaab	Guru Dutt	Geeta Bali, Abhi Bhattacharya, Smriti Biswas, Johnny Walker, Tun Tun, Rashid Khan, Moni Chatterjee, Helen, Bipin Gupta, Ram Singh, Nazir Kashmiri	Romance Drama	Music: Mukul Roy Lyrics: Majrooh Sultanpuri, Hasrat Jaipuri, Shailendra, Madhukar Rajasthani
Sajani	Vasant Painter	Anoop Kumar, Krishna Kumari, Ruby Myers, Lalita Pawar, Sapru, Gope		Music: Sudhir Phadke Lyrics: Narendra Sharma, Nakhshab
Samundari Daku	A. R. Zamindar	Nasir Khan, Nadira, Kumkum, Iftekhar, Johnny Walker, Nazir Kashmiri	Action	Music: Jaidev Lyrics: Vishwamitra Adil
Sati Ansuya	Dhirubhai Desai	Manhar Desai, Sumitra, Sulochana, Sunder, B. M. Vyas, Niranjan Sharma, Suryakant	Devotional	Music: Shivram Lyrics: Bharat Vyas
Sati Naag Kanya	Babubhai Mistri	Mahipal, Nirupa Roy, Manhar Desai, S. N. Tripathi, Samar Roy, Malaya	Mythology	Music: S. N. Tripathi Lyrics: Gopal Singh Nepali, B. D. Mishra, Saraswati Kumar Deepak
Shatranj	Gyan Mukherjee	Ashok Kumar, Meena Kumari, Yakub, Jagdish Sethi, Rajendra Nath, Nana Palsikar, Vijay Laxmi	Social Drama	Music: C. Ramchandra Lyrics: Rajendra Krishan
Shirin Farhad	Aspi Irani	Madhubala, Pradeep Kumar, P. Kailash, Ameeta, P Kailash, Ram Avtar, Jagdish Kanwal	Legend Romance	Music: S. Mohinder Lyrics: Tanvir Naqvi, Saba Afghani
Sheikh Chilli	Ramchandra Thakur	Shyama, Mahipal, Agha, B. M. Vyas, Bhagwan, Kammo	Fantasy	Music: Vinod Lyrics: Pandit Indra
Shrimati 420	G. P. Sippy	Meena Shorey, Johnny Walker, Om Prakash, Helen, Uma Dutt, Manorama	Comedy Social	Music: O. P. Nayyar Lyrics: Majrooh Sultanpuri, Jan Nisar Akhtar
Sipahsalar	Mohammed Husain	Shammi Kapoor, Nadira, Kumkum, S Nasir, Kamal Mehra, Helen, Cuckoo, Jagdish Kanwal, Nazir Kashmiri	Costume Drama	Music: Iqbal Lyrics: Faruk Kaiser
Sudarshan Chakra	Datta Dharamadhikari	Nalini Jaywant, Mahipal, Shahu Modak, Sheela Nayak, Sarkar, Sulochana, Jagdish Kanwal	Mythology	Music: Avinash Vyas Lyrics: Gopal Singh Nepali
Sultan-E-Alam	Mohan Sinha	Chitra, Mahipal, Kuldip Kaur, Hiralal, Maruti, Uma Dutt	Costume	Music: S. Mohinder Lyrics: Shyam Lal, Tanveer Naqvi, Butaram Sharma
Sultana Daku	Mohan Sinha	P. Jairaj, Sheila Ramani, Krishna Kumari, B. M. Vyas, Roopmala	Action	Music: Bipin Babul Lyrics: Kaifi Azmi, Anjum Jaipuri, Tanveer Naqvi, Shewan Rizvi
Taj	Nandalal Jaswantlal	Pradeep Kumar, Vyjayanthimala, Bipin Gupta, Jeevan, Helen, Ulhas, Shakuntala, Amar Kammo	Costume Drama	Music: Hemant Kumar Lyrics: Rajendra Krishan
Taj Aur Talwar	Dwarka Khosla	Daljeet, Shashikala, Smriti Biswas, B. M. Vyas, Maruti, Heera Sawant	Action Costume	Music: Sudipt Lyrics: Uddhav Kumar, Indeevar, Satya Rai, Shyam Hindi, K Razdan, Ismail Azad Qawwal
Taksaal	Hemen Gupta	Nirupa Roy, Balraj Sahni, Smriti Biswas, Iftekhar, Radhakrishan, Hiralal, Helen, Tun Tun, Nazir Kashmiri	Social	Music: Roshan Lyrics: Prem Dhawan
Talwar Ka Dhani	Dwarka Khosla	Manhar Desai, Nadira, Anwar Hussain, Shammi, B. M. Vyas, Pakku, Anwar, Maruti		Music: Chitragupta Lyrics: Anjum Jaipuri, Gopal Singh Nepali
Tankhah	Murtaza Changezi	Ajit, Nigar Sultana, Naina, Pran, Radhakrishan	Social	Music: Bhola Shreshtha Lyrics: Shewan Rizvi, Anjaan
Toofan Aur Deeya	Prabhat Kumar	Rajendra Kumar, Nanda, Vatsala Deshmukh, Shanta Kumari, Krishna Kumar, Keshavrao Date, Ulhas	Social Drama	Music: Vasant Desai, Lyrics: Bharat Vyas, Hasrat Jaipuri
Zindagi	C. L. Dheer	Geeta Bali, Chandrashekhar, Vijayalaxmi, Jaswant, Gulab, Jagdish Sethi, Rashid Khan, Jagirdar, Dulari	Social	Music: Mohammed Shafi Lyrics: Kaifi Azmi, Raja Mehdi Ali Khan
Zindagi Ke Mele	K. B. Lal	Chandrashekhar, Chitra, Kumkum, Minu Mumtaz, Dulari, Yakub, K. N. Singh, Lalita Pawar	Social	Music: Chitragupta Lyrics: Tanvir Naqvi, Shewan Rizvi, Manohar Khanna
