= Jhansi Ki Rani (1953 film) =

1953 film by Sohrab Modi

- Directed by: Sohrab Modi
- Written by: Pandit S. R. Dubey; Pandit Girish
- Produced by: Sohrab Modi
- Starring: Sohrab Modi; Mehtab; Sapru; Mubarak
- Cinematography: Ernest Haller assisted by M.N. Malhotra and Y. D. Sarpotdar
- Edited by: Russell Lloyd
- Music by: Vasant Desai; Pandit Radheshyam (lyrics)
- Production company: Minerva Movietone
- Release date: 24 January 1953
- Running time: 148 minutes
- Country: India
- Language: Hindi
- Budget: ₹6 million

Jhansi Ki Rani (transl. Queen of Jhansi) is a 1953 Indian Hindi-language historical drama film produced and directed by Sohrab Modi for his Minerva Movietone production banner. It is credited as the first Technicolor film made in India and starred Modi's wife, Mehtab in the title role, with Modi in the important role of her mentor, Rajguru (royal adviser). The film was dubbed in English as The Tiger and the Flame, which released in 1956 with the same star cast. The cast besides Mehtab and Sohrab Modi included Mubarak, Ulhas, Sapru, Ram Singh, Baby Shikha, Marconi and Shakila.

Set in the 19th century against the backdrop of the Mutiny of 1857, the film is about the bravery of queen Lakshmibai, Rani of Jhansi, who took up arms and led her army against the British. She was one of the first Indians to do so. It was the most expensive Hindi film up until then, with a budget ₹6 million, but became a box office failure.

== Plot ==
Rajguru (Sohrab Modi) decides that Jhansi should get its proper recognition in history. He comes across a young girl, Manu (the young Rani Lakshmibai), played by Baby Shikha. Her father has been hit by a carriage driven by an English driver. She gathers a few children to confront the driver. This, and her confrontation with an elephant impresses the Rajguru who takes her in hand, shaping her into becoming a determined leader. He arranges for her, at the age of nine, to marry the much older ruler of Jhansi, Gangadhar Rao (Mubarak), who is about fifty years old, and become Queen.

Manu grows up under the expert tutelage of the Rajguru, learning physical combat and political administration. The older Manu, now called Lakshmibai gives birth to a boy who dies. She adopts another boy, Damodar Rao, who the English refuse to accept as the rightful heir. This further sets her against the British. During the uprising of 1857 (1857 Mutiny), she fights against them, succumbing to her injuries in the end.

== Cast ==
The cast has been listed below:

- Mehtab as Rani Lakshmibai
- Sohrab Modi as Rajguru
- Mubarak as Gangadhar Rao
- Sapru as General Sir Hugh Rose
- Ulhas as Ghulam Ghaus Khan
- Ram Singh as Sadashiv Rao
- Baby Shikha as Manu
- Anil Kishore as Lieut. Henry Dowker
- Kamlakant as Moropant
- S.B. Nayampalli as Panditji
- Michael Shea as Major Eliss
- Gloria Gasper as Doris Dowker
- Marconi as Colonel Sleeman
- Shakila as Kashi
- Dar Kashmiri

== Production ==
The film was released in India in 1952 (1953) as Jhansi Ki Rani and released in the US as The Tiger and the Flame in 1956. Modi had Hollywood technicians brought in to help in the technical aspect of the film. He managed to create the right era using historical details correctly. The main cinematographer was the Hollywood Oscar winner for Gone with the Wind (1939), Ernest Haller, who was assisted by M. N. Malhotra and Y. D. Sarpotdar. The editor was Russell Lloyd from England. The film deviated from the fictionalised accounts and stuck to the extracts from the novel Jhansi Ki Rani (1946) by Vrindavan Lal Verma

== Sohrab Modi And Historicals ==
Modi concentrated on Historicals, prominent of which were Pukar (1939), Sikandar (1941), Jhansi Ki Rani (1953), and Mirza Ghalib (1954), which are "considered milestones of the genre".

== Box-office ==
The press praised the film lauding Modi's use of colour and direction. However, in spite of having spent lavishly on technicians, sets, war scenes and making it in colour, the film was a big box office disaster causing Modi great financial losses. Modi was blamed for casting his wife Mehtab in the title role of Lakshmibai, who looked too old at 35 years to portray the young queen half her age.

== Crew ==
Crew

- Dialogue: L. Bijlani and Dialogue director was William DeLane Lea
- Screenplay: Geza Herceg, Adi F. Keeka and Sudarshan
- Audiographer: M. Eduljee

== Soundtrack ==
While the English version (1956, dubbed) had no songs, the Hindi version had music by Vasant Desai and lyrics by Pandit Radheshyam. The playback singers were Mohammed Rafi, Sulochana Kadam, Suman Purohit, Parshuram and P. Ramakant. Two songs in Mohammed Rafi's voice remain notable: "Amar Hai Jhansi Ki Rani" and "Rajguru Ne Jhansi Chhodi".

=== Songlist ===
#	Title	Singer
1	"Amar Hai Jhansi Ki Rani"	Mohammed Rafi
2	"Rajguru Ne Jhansi Chhodi"	Mohammed Rafi
3	"Humara Pyara Hindustan"	Mohammed Rafi
4	"Har Har Mahadev Ka Nara"	Sulochana Kadam, Suman Purohit, Parshuram, Ramakant
5	"Azadi Ki Ye Aag Hai Lajawab"	Mohammed Rafi
6	"Kahan Baje Kishan Teri Bansuriya"	
7	"Badhe Chalo Bahaduro"	
8	"Nari Jee Jee Re Jee Jee Re"	

== Trivia ==
- Impressed by Hema Malini's performance in Razia Sultan (1983), Modi wanted to remake Jhansi Ki Rani with her in the lead.
- Kamala Markandaya, in her novel Possession (1963), chapter 12, makes say to the narrator, a woman who appears to represent the author herself, autobiographically, that in the beginning of the 1950s she wrote the scenario of Rani of Jhansi.
