= Prithvi Vallabh (1943 film) =

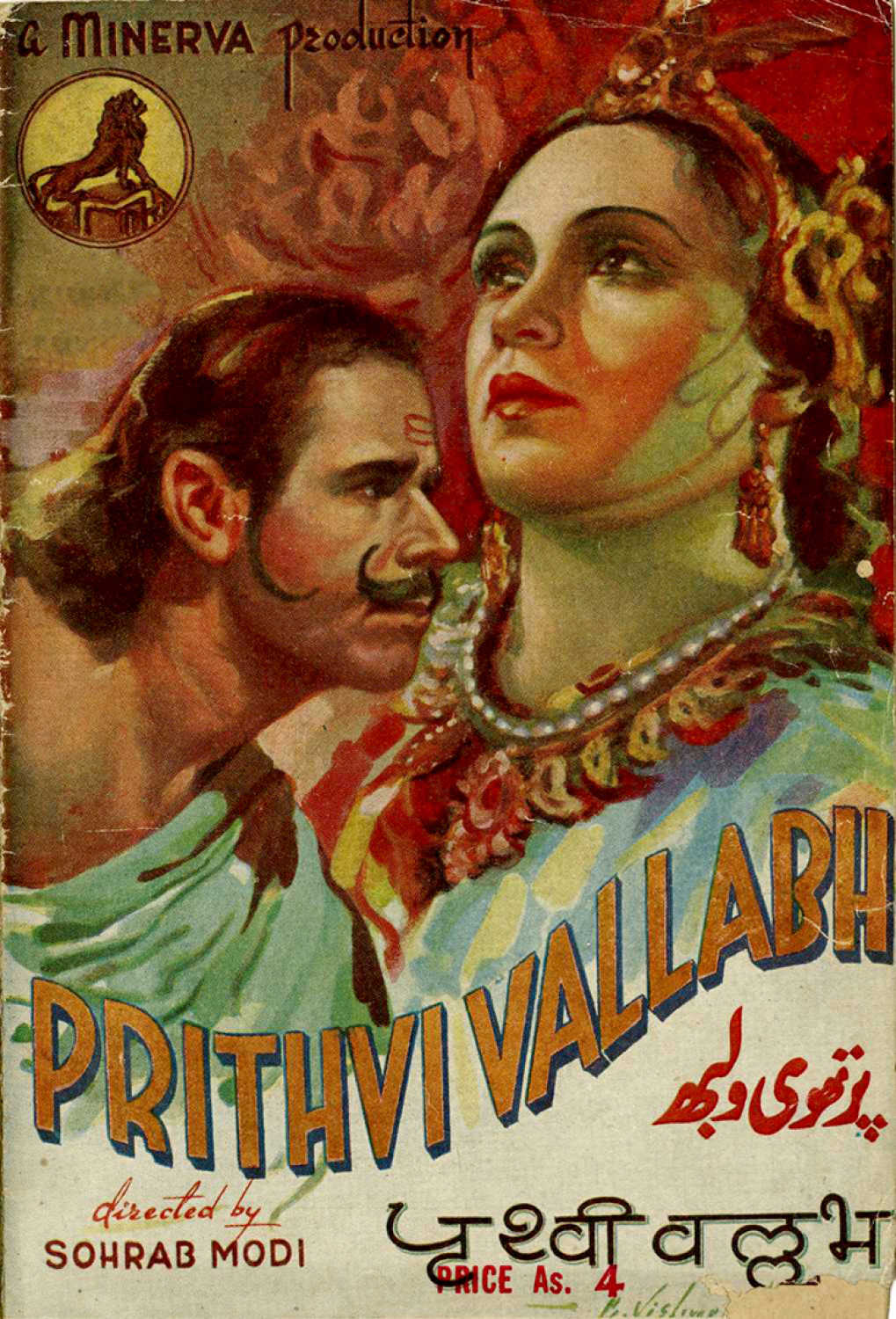
- Prithvi Vallabh (1943)
- Directed by: Sohrab Modi
- Written by: K. M. Munshi
- Produced by: Minerva Movietone
- Starring: Sohrab Modi; Durga Khote; Sankatha Prasad; Meena Shorey; K. N. Singh; Kajjanbai
- Cinematography: Y. D. Sarpotdar
- Music by: Rafiq Ghaznavi; Saraswati Devi
- Production company: Minerva Movietone
- Release date: 1943
- Running time: 121 minutes
- Country: India
- Language: Hindi

Full film

Prithvi Vallabh is an Indian historical drama film directed by Sohrab Modi. Made under the Minerva Movietone banner it was released in 1943. It had music by Rafiq Ghaznavi and Saraswati Devi with lyrics by Pandit Sudershan who also wrote the screenplay and dialogues. The film starred Sohrab Modi, Durga Khote, Sankatha Prasad, Kajjanbai, Meena Shorey, Sadiq Ali, K. N. Singh and Al Nasir.

== Plot ==
The story revolves around two kings, Prithvi Vallabh (Munj) of Avantipur and Tailapa, a neighboring king. With the help of his sister Mrinalvati (Durga Khote) and another neighbouring king Bhillam (K. N. Singh), Tailap manages to capture Prithvi Vallabh. The rest of the film follows incidents following his captivity.

== Cast ==
The cast is as follows:

- Sohrab Modi as Munj
- Durga Khote as Mrinalvati
- Sankatha Prasad as Tailap
- K. N. Singh as Bhillam
- Kajjanbai as Lakshmi Devi
- Meena Shorey as Vilas
- Amirbai Karnataki as Charini, the devotee
- Sadiq Ali as Kavi Raj
- Leela Mishra as Bhillam's wife
- Al Nasir as Bhoj, Munj's son
- Navin Yagnik as Satyashray

== Production ==
The film was a remake of 1924 silent film Prithvi Vallabh by Manilal Joshi. The story is an adaptation of K. M. Munshi's book Prithivivallabh written in 1920.

== Soundtrack ==
Prithvi Vallabh

Soundtrack album by Rafiq Ghaznavi, Saraswati Devi
- Released: 1943
- Genre: Feature film soundtrack
- Language: Hindi

All lyrics are written by Sudarshan; all music is composed by Rafiq Ghaznavi, Saraswati Devi

Track listing
No.	Title	Singer(s)	Length
1.	"Tailap Ki Nagri Me Gana Nahi Hai"	Rafique Ghaznavi, Menka Bai
2.	"Ram Naam Dhan Paya Maine"	Menka Bai
3.	"Panchi Ud Chal Apne Desh"	Menka Bai, Rafique Ghaznavi
4.	"Aankho Me Muskuraye Jaa"	Menka Bai
5.	"Hawa Ne Bandha Hai Kya Rang"	Amirbai Karnataki
6.	"Jeevan Ka Jug Aaya Jivan Ka Sukh Laya"	Amirbai Karnataki
7.	"Khule Swarg Ke Dwar Jag Me"	Menka Bai

== Reception ==
It was not a major success compared to Modi's previous big budget films like Pukar (1939) and Sikandar (1941).
