= Madhav Vaze =

Indian actor (1939–2025)

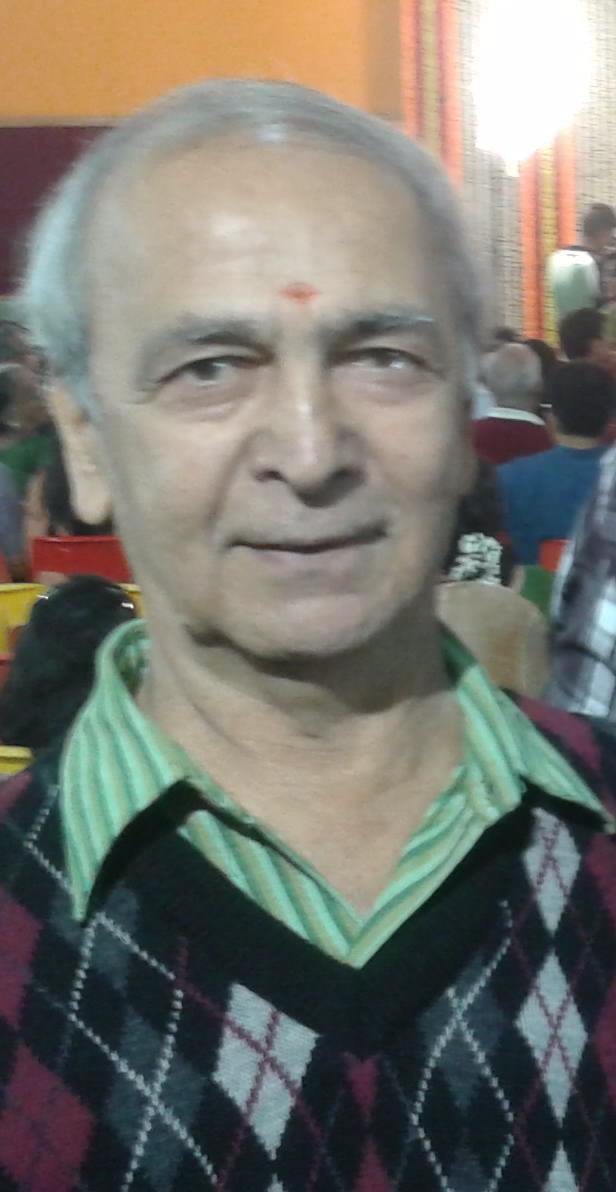
- Born: 21 October 1939; India
- Died: 7 May 2025 (aged 85); Pune, Maharashtra, India
- Years active: 1953–2025
- Known for: Shyam in Shyamchi Aai and Joy Lobo's Father in 3 Idiots

Madhav Vaze (21 October 1939 – 7 May 2025) was an Indian actor. He mainly acted and directed in theatre, with some stints in films.

== Early life ==
Vaze was born on 21 October, 1939. He lived in Pune in his formative years.

== Career ==
Vaze started out his career as a child artist in the critically acclaimed film Shyamchi Aai.

In 2009, Vaze made a guest appearance in the Bollywood film 3 Idiots. Director Aamir Khan expressed that he would like to work with Vaze in the theatre.

In 2013, Vaze directed a production of Hamlet in Marathi, translated by Parshuram Deshpande and featuring Kanak Datye and Neha Mahajan.

He was also an English lecturer at the Nowrosjee Wadia College in Pune.

In March 2015, he appeared in the Vodafone m-Pesa advertisement as Babuji.

== Death ==
Vaze died in Pune on 7 May 2025, at the age of 85.

== Filmography ==
- Shyamchi Aai (1953)
- Vahininchya Bangdya (1953)
- 3 Idiots (2009)
- Dear Zindagi (2016)
- Baapjanma (2017)
- Chappad Phaad Ke (2019) as Atmaram Gupchup

== Awards ==
His debut film Shyamchi Aai won the President's award and was one of the first films ever in India.
