= Nausherwan-E-Adil =

1957 film

Farz Aur Mohabbat / Nausherwan-E-Adil
- Directed by: Sohrab Modi
- Written by: Shams Lucknowi
- Screenplay by: Shams Lucknowi
- Story by: Shams Lucknowi
- Produced by: Sohrab Modi
- Starring: Sohrab Modi; Raaj Kumar; Mala Sinha
- Cinematography: Lateef; Bhandare
- Edited by: P. Bhalchandra
- Music by: C. Ramchandra
- Production company: Minerva Movietone
- Distributed by: Minerva Movietone
- Release date: 1957
- Country: India
- Language: Hindi

Farz Aur Mohabbat (transl. Duty and Love) alias Nausherwan-E-Adil (transl. Nausherwan, the just), is a 1957 Indian costume action drama Hindi/Urdu film directed by Sohrab Modi.

Produced by Minerva Movietone, it had music composed by C. Ramchandra with lyrics by Parwaiz Shamshi. The story, screenplay and dialogue writer was Shams Lucknowi. The cinematographer was Lateef Bhandare. The cast included Sohrab Modi, Raaj Kumar, Mala Sinha, Naseem Banu, Bipin Gupta and Shammi.

The story is about an unbiased ruler, Nausherwan-E-Adil (Sohrab Modi), whose fair sense of justice brings about tragedy in his personal life involving his wife and son. The theme had some resemblance to Modi's earlier success Pukar (1939).

== Plot ==
The Sultan-e-Iran (Emperor of Iran) is a just ruler, known as such. He is also known as Nausherwan the Just (Sohrab Modi). His laws apply to everyone equally, and he follows them when dispensing justice. However, when questioned about a certain ruling by the Christian priest David (Bipin Gupta), he realises that the laws he is following have been passed down through the ages in an unwritten form. He therefore decides to rectify this, instructing his Wazir (Niranjan Sharma) to begin work on the task. Nausherwan then goes incognito into his country to see for himself whether his people are content and happy. Upon his return, he begins to reform the laws with the help of his judiciary. He introduces two new laws: anyone who deceives a girl will be walled up, and anyone who rebels against the state will be put to death.

Nausherwan and his wife, Malika-e-Iran Khazar (Naseem Banu), had two sons: Naushahzad, (Raaj Kumar), and Hormuz. Nausherwan declares his eldest son, Naushahzad, as heir to the throne. Naushahzad saves a young girl by fishing her out of the water with the help of his friend Altaf. They take her to the priest, David, who discovers that she is his long-lost daughter, Marcia (Mala Sinha). Naushazad claims to be a Christian named Joseph. Marcia and "Joseph" soon fall in love.

Joseph tells his mother, who is also Christian, that he is a Christian too. However, she asks him to hide this from his father, as only someone of Iranian (Zoroastrian) descent can become king. Complications arise when David and Marcia come to Nausherwan demanding justice, as they feel that Naushahzad "Joseph" has deceived them. When Nausherwan delivers a judgement in accordance with his laws, Naushahzad rebels and is overpowered by the Commander (Murad), who fatally wounds him. Marcia kills herself with a dagger. Nausherwan renounces his kingdom and appoints his younger son, Hormuz, as the new ruler.

== Cast ==
- Sohrab Modi as Sultan-E-Iran Nausherwan-E-Adil
- Raaj Kumar as Shehzada Naushazad / Joseph
- Mala Sinha as Marcia
- Naseem Banu as Malika-E-Iran Khazar
- Bipin Gupta as Hakim David
- Murad as Ram Wazir
- Agha as Altaf
- Shammi as Altaf's Wife
- Niranjan Sharma as Wazir-E-Ala

== Soundtrack ==
The film had music direction by C. Ramchandra and the credited lyricist is Parwaiz Shamsi. In reality, the songs were written by Shams Lucknowi. He asked Sohrab Modi to credit the name of Parvez Shamsi (his daughter) because he wanted to leave something on her name. The playback singers were Lata Mangeshkar, Mohammed Rafi, Asha Bhosle, Zohrabai Ambalewali and Chandbala. The film had some popular songs including the ghazal, "Yeh Hasrat Thi Kay Is Duniya Mein Bas Do Kaam Kar Jaate", sung by Mohammed Rafi for Raaj Kumar.

=== Song list ===
Song	Singer
"Bheeni Bheeni Hai"	Lata Mangeshkar
"Raat Dhali, Jaan Chali"	Lata Mangeshkar
"Matlab Ki Yeh Duniya Hai"	Lata Mangeshkar
"Taron Ki Zuban Par Hai Mohabbat Ki Kahani"	Lata Mangeshkar, Mohammed Rafi
"Bhool Jayen Sare Gham, Doob Jayen Pyar Mein"	Lata Mangeshkar, Mohammed Rafi
"Yeh Hasrat Thi Ke"	Mohammed Rafi
"Yeh Nazaqat, Yeh Aalam"	Asha Bhosle
"Mere Dard-E-Jigar Ki Har Dhadkan Manzil Ka Pata Batlati Hai"	Asha Bhosle, Zohrabai Ambalewali, Chandbala
"Khushamad Ka Hai"	C. Ramchandra

== Trivia ==
Raaj Kumar was unable to make his mark following this film, even though he was cast as a hero opposite Mala Sinha.
