= Nastic (disambiguation) =

Nastic movements occur in plants.

Nastic may also refer to:

- Nàstic, Spanish sports club
- Nastić, the surname of:
  - Bojan Nastić (born 1994), Bosnian footballer
  - Nenad Nastić (born 1981), Serbian footballer
  - Radovan Nastić (born 1975), American multimedia sub cultural artist
  - Stefan Nastić (born 1992), Serbian professional basketball player
  - Varnava Nastić (1914–1964), Serbian–American bishop
  - Żaklin Nastić (born 1980), German politician (The Left)

== See also ==
- Nastik (disambiguation)
