= Astika (disambiguation) =

Āstika is a Hindu who believes in the Vedas.

Astika may also refer to:

- Astika (Hinduism), a sage in Hindu mythology
- Astika (beer), a Bulgarian beer brand
- Aastik, a 1956 Indian Hindi-language film

== See also ==
- Nastik (disambiguation), antonym of astika
