= Sheesh Mahal (1950 film) =

1950 film

- Directed by: Sohrab Modi
- Written by: Khan-Bahadur Hakim Ahmad Shuja
- Produced by: Sohrab Modi
- Starring: Naseem Banu; Sohrab Modi; Gajanan Jagirdar; Eruch Tarpore; Pushpa Hans
- Cinematography: M.N. Malhotra
- Edited by: D. D. Shirdhankar; P. Bhalchander
- Music by: Vasant Desai
- Production company: Minerva Movietone
- Release date: 1950
- Running time: 144 minutes
- Country: India
- Language: Hindi

Sheesh Mahal (Palace of Mirrors) is a 1950 social Urdu/Hindi film produced and directed by Sohrab Modi for Minerva Movietone.

The story writer was Hakim Ahmad Shuja, an Urdu poet and writer. The screenplay and dialogue were by Munshi Abdul Baqui and Shams Lucknawi. The music direction was by Vasant Desai and the lyricists were Aajiz, Shams Lucknowi and Nazim Panipati.

The film starred Sohrab Modi, Naseem Banu, Mubarak, Pran, Nigar Sultana, Pushpa Hans, Jawahar Kaul and Leela Mishra.

Naseem plays the daughter of a feudal aristocrat who sticks to his old ways in spite of being reduced to penury. In contrast to her role in Pukar (1939), she "dressed simply, with little make-up", with her acting leaving an emotional impact on the audiences. And Bakwas is the builder of Sheesh Mahal

== Plot ==
Thakur Jaspal Singh (Sohrab Modi), an old feudal aristocrat, lives with his two daughters, Ranja (Naseem Banu) and Nalini (Pushpa Hans), and his son, Balram, in a grand mansion called Sheesh Mahal. He upholds the honour of his long family lineage, citing the valour of days gone by. His lifestyle far exceeds his financial means. His children try to warn him about his excessive spending, but his feudal mindset refuses to acknowledge that they are in dire straits. Ultimately, they are forced to sell their mansion to Durgaprasad (Mubarak), a former worker who has since become wealthy. They move into a small, dilapidated house. The brother finds work in a factory but is involved in an accident which results in the amputation of his leg. Desperate, Ranjana finds work as a maid for Roopa (Nigar Sultana), Durgaprasad's daughter. When Durgadas comes to ask for his daughter's hand in marriage for his son Vikram (Jawahar Kaul), Jaspal Singh refuses, claiming that although Durgadas may have bought the Sheesh Mahal, he's still a labourer compared to his aristocratic family. Balram argues with his father about maintaining false pretences. Sundarmukh (Pran) — who had been engaged to Ranjana but broke off the engagement because of their poverty — comes to inform Jaspal that his daughter is having an affair with his son while working at Durgadas' house. Jaspal is furious and rushes to kill Ranjana in order to avenge the honour of the Rajputs. At the Sheesh Mahal, Durgadas stops him, delivering a lecture on honour and different warriors. Jaspal hesitates and falls down the steps. Before he dies, he blesses the union between Ranjana and Vikram.

== Cast ==
- Sohrab Modi as Thakur Jaspal Singh
- Naseem Banu as Ranjana
- Mubarak as Durgadas
- Nigar Sultana as Roopa Devi
- Pran as Sundarmukh
- Jawahar Kaul as Vikram
- Amarnath as Balram
- Leela Mishra as Vikram's mother
- Ghulam Mohiuddin
- Sadat Ali

== Crew ==
- Producer: Sohrab Modi
- Music director: Vasant Desai
- Lyricist: Aajiz, Shams Lucknowi, Nazim Panipati (as well as an adaptation of Hakim Ahmad Shuja's poem)
- Cinematographer: M. Malhotra
- Dances: Prem Dhawan
- Editing: D. D. Shirdhankar and P. Bhalchander
- Processed: Bombay Film Laboratory
- Make-up Artist: M. N. Borkar
- Recording Director: M. Edulji
- Art Director: Rusi K. Banker

== Review ==
Though the film is still praised for its lavish sets show-casing the mansion almost on par with Mughal-E-Azam as cited by Amrit Gangar, the film came in for extremely harsh criticism from Baburao Patel of Filmindia, who had an old feud going with Modi. Patel in the October 1950 issue of Filmindia claimed "... Sheesh Mahal fails miserably to appeal". However, Motions Picture Magazine in its February 1951 issue commended Modi for assuring the public that he still retained the "mastery of his craft". In overall terms, the film, despite some shortcomings, has a strong storyline and is well-directed by Modi, with exceptional roles by Naseem and Mubarak.

== Soundtrack ==
Vasant Desai composed all the songs. The singers were Shamshad Begum, Geeta Dutt, Pushpa Hans and Mohammed Rafi. Pushpa Hans was a known singer and actress of those days. Chaman and Sheesh Mahal were her notable films.

=== Songlist ===
#	Title	Singer	Lyricist
1	"Muqaddar Ke Hathon"	Shamshad Begum	Shams Lakhnavi
2	"Husnwalon Ki Galiyon Mein"	Shamshad Begum	Shams Lakhnavi
3	"Aayi Hai Deewali Sakhi Aayi Sakhi Aayi"	Shamshad Begum, Geeta Dutt	Nazim Panipati
4	"Jise Dhundti Phirti Hai Meri Nazar"	Mohammed Rafi, Geeta Dutt	Nazim Panipati/adaptation of Hakim Ahmad Shuja's poem
5	"Aadmi Wo Haaye Musibat Se Pareshan Na Ho"	Pushpa Hans	Shams Lakhnavi, Behzad Lucknavi
6	"Bhoole Zamane Yaad Na Kar"	Pushpa Hans	Shams Lakhnavi
7	"Takdeer Banane Wale"	Pushpa Hans	Aaziz
8	"Tum Dekh Rahe Ho Ki Mite Saare Sahare"	Pushpa Hans	Behzad Lakhnavi
9	"Hum Kheto Ke Maharaj"	Pushpa Hans, Mohammed Rafi, Geeta Dutt	Nazim Panipati
