= Parbat Pe Apna Dera =

- Directed by: V. Shantaram
- Written by: Dewan Sharar
- Produced by: V. Shantaram
- Starring: Ulhas; Vanmala; Shantarin; Madan Mohan
- Cinematography: V. Avadhoot
- Music by: Vasant Desai
- Production company: Rajkamal Kalamandir
- Release date: 8 August 1944
- Country: India
- Language: Hindi

Parbat Pe Apna Dera (On The Mountain We Live) is a Bollywood film directed by V. Shantaram. It was released in 1944. The story, dialogues and lyrics were written by Dewan Sharar. The music was composed by Vasant Desai. The film was produced under the Rajkamal Kalamandir banner and starred the "sensitive actress" Vanmala. Ulhas, cited as an actor known for his "melodramatic histrionics and a sonorous voice" was chosen to play the lead role of an "ascetic turned playboy". The cast included Shantarin, Madan Mohan, Kanta Kumari and Baby Nalini.

The film revolved around the theme of sexual repression with the complex leitmotif making use of "symbols and icons". It portrays a young man living in the hills with his belief in all things saintly. He gives up his celibate lifestyle when he falls in love with a blind girl whom he cures and marries. He soon falls a prey to his sexual urges seeking extra-marital quests.

== Synopsis ==
Ram Babu (Ulhas) is a devout man living on top of a hill and taking care of a Shiva temple. Meera Devi is a blind heiress who comes to the temple and wants to serve Ram Babu, who takes pity on her and lets her stay in the temple. He cures her eyesight with herbal medication and the two fall in love and marry. Once out of his celibate lifestyle, Ram Babu goes looking for hedonistic pleasure after his wife asks him to leave. On Dusshera, during one of his chases after a young girl, a friend of Meera, he gets blinded by the fire from the effigy. He realises his wrongdoing and once again gives himself up to the service of Shiva helped by his wife. A miracle occurs during the tolling of temple bells where Babu Ram regains his eyesight.

== Cast ==
- Vanamala as Meera Devi
- Madan Mohan as Mangal
- Ulhas
- Shantarin
- Kanta Kumari
- Baby Nalini
- P. L. Samant

== Production and reception ==
The film was the second film produced by Shantaram's Rajkamal Kalamandir and was directed by Shantaram. According to a journalist (Sri Panchak) reporting in the magazine Roopmancha, and quoted in the book "Bengali Cinema: 'An Other Nation'", Shantaram spent Rs. 40, 000 on the "settings".

Parbat Pe Apna Dera was one of the successes that followed Kalandir's films after Shakuntala. The film was "extremely popular" and went on to celebrate a jubilee (twenty-five weeks). The other successful films included Dr. Kotnis Ki Amar Kahani (1946), Lokshahir Ram Joshi (1947), Apna Desh (1949), Dahej (1950), Parchhain (1952), Teen Batti Char Raasta (1953), and Do Aankhen Barah Haath (1957) among others.

== Soundtrack ==
The film's music was directed by Vasant Desai. Out of the nine songs he composed, he gave playback singing for one. He did not make use of Vanmala's voice as she was not an "accomplished singer". Desai made use of echo effects in his composition, which proved to be a success. The singers were Amirbai Karnataki, Zohrabai Ambalewali, Lalita Devulkar, Naseem Akhtar, Vasant Desai, Parshuram and Khan Mastana. The lyricist was Dewan Sharar.

=== Songlist ===
#	Title	Singer
1	"Aa Niklo Guiya Meri Gali Se"	Vasant Desai, Naseem Akhtar
2	"Aankhon Wale Tu Dekh Ke Chal"	Lalita Devulkar, Parshuram
3	"Aati Hai Ek Baar"	Khan Mastana
4	"Humse Kar Le Preet Ri Jogan"	Naseem Akhtar, Vasant Desai
5	"Is Duniya Se Humko Kya Matlab"	Parshuram
6	"Jinko Na Kabhi Kuch Aaye Nazar"	Amirbai Karnataki
7	"Jo Dard Banke Zamana Pe Chhaye"	Zohrabai Ambalewali
8	"Parbat Pe Apna Dera"	Amirbai Karnataki, Parshuram
9	"Pareshan Hoon Ki Kyun Meri Pareshani Nahi Jaati"	Amirbai Karnataki
