= Atma Tarang =

- Directed by: Sohrab Modi
- Produced by: Sohrab Modi
- Starring: Sohrab Modi; Feroze Dastur; Prabha; Eruch Tarapore
- Cinematography: Dara Mistry
- Music by: Habib Khan
- Production company: Minerva Movietone
- Release date: 1937
- Running time: 121 minutes
- Country: India
- Language: Hindi

Atma Tarang is a 1937 Hindi social drama film directed by Sohrab Modi. This film and Khan Bahadur, made the same year, were the first films produced under Modi's newly established banner, Minerva Movietone (1936). The music was composed by Habib Khan, with art direction by Rusi K. Banker. The film starred the singer-actor Feroz Dastur in the role of Mohan, with Sohrab Modi, Prabha, and Vasant Pahelwan. C. Ramchandra, the famous music composer was a harmonium accompanist for Minerva Movietone music directors like Habib Khan and Bindu Khan. He also acted in a small role in Atma Tarang and in the earlier Said-e-Havas (1936).

The story involved the topic of Brahmacharya, which was Modi's preference for his first film under the Minerva banner, as he was influenced at that time by his interest in the Ramakrishna Mission.

== Cast ==
- Sohrab Modi
- Prabha
- Feroze Dastur
- Vasant Pahelwan
- Eruch Tarapore
- Gulzar
- S. L. Puri

== Box office ==
According to Modi in a 1988 Films Division of India biographical film- Sohrab Modi by Yash Chaudhary, Atma Tarang was the biggest flop he ever made. Modi stated that while waiting in the Minerva Theatre (where the film was released), Bombay, he observed there were hardly 20-30 people in the audience. Four men approached him and congratulated a by-then dejected Modi, and told him to continue making good films like Atma Tarang and he would reach the top one day. He later found out that the four men were judges of the Bombay High Court.

== Soundtrack ==
The music director was Habib Khan.

=== Song list ===
| # | Title |
|---|---|
| 1 | "Brindaban Mein Leela Rachi" |
| 2 | "Jhootha Yeh Sansar Re Jhoothi Maya" |
| 3 | "Is Prithvi Mein Har Ne Sadhu Kaisa Khel Rachaya Hai" |
| 4 | "Jap Naam Harihar Narayan Shri Ram Hari" |
| 5 | "Bansuri Bajao Hey Shyam Abhiram" |
| 6 | "Padi Bipata Hari Hai Bhagwan" |
| 7 | "Rakh Lee Laaj More Prabhu Ne Aaj" |
| 8 | "Mana Mana Re Man Matware Khushi Mana Re" |
| 9 | "Kaisi Prem Basant Rut Suhani Laage" |
| 10 | "Jagat Mein Prem Bada Balwan" |
| 11 | "Dhanya Dhanya Raja Indra Tum" |
