= Shyamchi Aai (1953 film) =

1953 film by Pralhad Keshav Atre

- Theatrical release poster
- Directed by: Acharya Atre
- Written by: Acharya Atre
- Screenplay by: Acharya Atre
- Story by: Sane Guruji
- Based on: Shyamchi Aai by Sane Guruji
- Produced by: Acharya Atre
- Starring: Vanamala; Madhav Vaze; Damuanna Joshi
- Cinematography: C. M. Rele
- Edited by: Narayan Rao
- Music by: Vasant Desai
- Release date: 1953
- Running time: 152 Minutes
- Country: India
- Language: Marathi

Shyamchi Aai (lit.:Shyam's Mother) is a 1953 Marathi film, directed by P.K.Atre. It is based on the book Shyamchi Aai written by Sane Guruji in Marathi. The film was acclaimed upon release. It stars Damuanna Joshi, Vanamala and Madhav Vaze. Shyamchi Aai won the Golden Lotus Award for Best Film at the National Film Awards in 1954.

== Plot ==
The plot revolves around a boy called Shyam and his relationship with his mother. It shares the effect Shyam's mother has had on Shyam's life and upbringing, and how he is taught to stick to his ideals and principles, even in the face of poverty. The relationships of all the individuals in Shyam's family are explored. The film ends with the illness and sad death of Shyam's mother.

== Cast ==
- Damuanna Joshi as Sane Guruji
- Vanamala as Shyam's Mother
- Madhav Vaze as Shyam

== Awards ==
The film has won the following awards since its release:

1st National Film Awards (India)

- 1953 - President's gold medal for the All India Best Feature Film
