= Mother India (1938 film) =

1938 Indian film

- Sharifa Bai in a publicity still for Mother India
- Directed by: Dada Gunjal
- Written by: Mohanlal G. Dave
- Starring: Sharifa Bai; Ghulam Mohammed; Pramilla
- Music by: Ram Gopal
- Color process: Cinecolor
- Release date: 1938
- Country: India
- Language: Hindi

Mother India is a 1938 Indian Hindi-language film directed by Dada Gunjal. The film starred Sharifa Bai as Sabita, a housewife whose suffering and sacrifices are used to portray her as an allegorical embodiment of Mother India. The film was shot using the Cinecolor process and, according to film historian Panna Shah, was the second Indian colour film after Kisan Kanya (1937).

Mother India was released in Bombay in January 1939 and was promoted by The Times of India as "Sharifa's Triumph". The film became a major box-office success in the city, particularly at the Royal Opera House, where it was screened for more than 82 weeks.

Although critic Baburao Patel found the colour process unsatisfactory, he praised the film's story, direction, and performances. Sharifa's performance was particularly acclaimed; Patel described her portrayal as "superb artistry that calls for big praise".

== Cast ==
- Sharifa Bai as Sabita
- Sushila as Bindu
- Ghulam Mohammed as Mahendra
- W. M. Khan as Niranjan
- Pramilla as Nalini
- Suraiya as Maya
- Ashiq Hussein as Nandkumar
