= Raj Hath =

- Original poster of the film
- Directed by: Sohrab Modi
- Written by: Shams Lacknavi
- Screenplay by: Shams Lacknavi
- Story by: Shams Lacknavi
- Produced by: Sohrab Modi
- Starring: Pradeep Kumar; Madhubala; Tun Tun; Sohrab Modi; Ulhas
- Cinematography: Lateef; Bhandare
- Edited by: P. Bhalchandra
- Music by: Shankar–Jaikishan
- Production company: Minerva Movietone
- Distributed by: Minerva Movietone
- Release date: 6 January 1956
- Running time: 150 minutes
- Country: India
- Language: Hindi
- Box office: ₹1.35 crore (equivalent to ₹168 crore or US$18 million in 2026)

Raj Hath, also called Rajhath (Devanagari:राजहठ; meaning "Royal obstinacy or stubbornness"), is a 1956 Indian (Hindi) romantic fantasy drama film directed and produced by Sohrab Modi. It starred Pradeep Kumar, Madhubala, Tun Tun, Sohrab Modi and Ulhas in the main roles. The music for the film was scored by well known music directors, Jaikishan Dayabhai Panchal and Shankarsingh Raghuwanshi, often credited as Shankar Jaikishan.

The story revolves around two neighboring empires with long-term mutual enmity, whose children turn their rivalry into love.

== Plot ==
The king of Jagmer, Maharaja Daljeet (Sohrab Modi), sends a marriage proposal to the king of a neighboring city, Sultanpur. In the proposal Maharaja Daljeet asks to marry his daughter, Raja Beti (Madhubala), to Kumar (Pradeep Kumar), the son of the king of Sultanpur (Ulhas). The king of Sultanpur strongly rejects the proposal and states that the long term rivalry between the two empires is the reason for his refusal; he is injuriously disrespected by the messenger, Sabgram Singh (Murad). Later, the king of Sultanpur also says that Daljeet has conspired against his empire, and by proposing the marriage he wants to take revenge. The disrespectful behavior of the king of Sultanpur makes Daljeet angry, and he orders preparations for a war against Sultanpur. Daljeet also provokes his daughter to take vengeance against the king of Sultanpur for the insult. The fortress of the king of Sultanpur is well known for a trap in which troops flounder. Daljeet learns of a map of the fortress, which will help troops navigate across the trap. While retrieving the map from the enemy camp, one of the Daljeet's important soldiers is caught and killed. Daljeet realizes the task is full of risk so he invites the bravest soldiers in the kingdom to try, but they all refuse. After the denial of the brave soldiers, Juhi (Kammo) and Raja Beti accept the task and dress up as men to infiltrate the enemy camp. After much hardship, they at last get the map. While returning in disguise as a shepherdess, Raja Beti meets Kumar. Kumar at first meeting, begins to fall in love with her, but he is unaware that the shepherdess is actually the princess of Jagmer.

Raja Beti gives the map to Daljeet. When everything is planned and the army is ready for the war, Daljeet orders an attack on Sultanpur. Raja Beti decides to take revenge for the insult by killing the king of Sultanpur's son, Kumar. But in the combat zone she finds herself in love with Kumar and unable to kill him. Although Kumar knows that the shepherdess is really Raja Beti, he doesn't stop loving her. Kumar asks his father for permission to marry Raja Beti, and after a long disagreement, Kumar's father agrees. But now, Daljeet refuses the proposal and shows disrespect. However, Daljeet soon realizes that Raja Beti is in love with Kumar and promises to allow the marriage. Daljeet overlooks past rivalries and asks the king of Sultanpur that the marriage should go ahead. At last they marry.

Later, Daljeet regrets his action as he broke a royal promise and bowed down to fulfill Raja Beti's wishes. Out of extreme repentance, he commits suicide.

== Cast ==
- Pradeep Kumar as Kumar
- Madhubala as Raja Beti
- Sohrab Modi
- Ulhas

== Soundtrack ==
Rafi's partnership with Shankar Jaikishan was among the most famous and successful in the Hindi film industry. The song "Aaye Bahaar Ban Ke..." proved to be one of the hit songs of the partnership.

Soundtracks
No.	Title	Singer(s)	Length
1.	"Aaye Bahaar Ban Ke Lubha Kar Chale"	Mohammed Rafi	5:02
2.	"Ye Wada Karo, Chand Ke Samne"	Lata Mangeshkar and Mukesh	4.59
3.	"Mere Sapne Me Aana Re Sajna"	Lata Mangeshkar	5:10
4.	"Naache Ang Ang Ang Tere Ang"	Lata Mangeshkar	5:22
5.	"Aa Gayi Lo Aa Gayi Mai Jhumti"	Lata Mangeshkar	5:07
6.	"Kaha Se Milte Moti, Aansoo Hai Meri Taqdeer Me"	Lata Mangeshkar	5:07
7.	"Sun Sakhi More Man Ki Baat, Nadiya Kinare Phiru Pyasi"	Lata Mangeshkar	4:50
8.	"Chale Sipahi Dhool Udate"	Manna Dey	4:33
9.	"Aaja Aaja Nadiya Kinare"	Lata Mangeshkar	4:00
10.	"Antar Mantar Jantar Se Maidaan Liya Hai Maar"	Usha Mangeshkar and Lata Mangeshkar	3:50
11.	"Pyaare Babul Se Bichhad Ke"	Lata Mangeshkar	3:00

== Crew ==
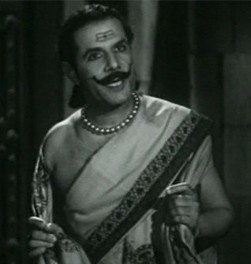
Sohrab Modi

The film was directed and produced by the Dadasaheb Phalke Award winner Sohrab Modi under the Minerva Movietone banner. He was also a member of the 10th Berlin International Film Festival. Along with directing and producing, he played a significant role in the film.

The lyrics for the songs were written by lyricists Hasrat Jaipuri and Shailendra. The 2013 Dadasaheb Phalke award winner, Gulzar occasionally stated that Shailendra was the best lyricist in the Indian film Industry. The story for the film was written by Shams Lucknowi.

Music directors who wrote "everlasting" and "immortal melodies" in the fifties and sixties composed music for the film. They are often credited as Shankar Jaikishan. Shankar-Jaikishan were also honored with the Padmashri by the Government of India.

Madhubala, one of the most influential personalities in the Hindi film industry, is seen to be dressed up like a man in the film so that she can recover documents from the enemy camp.

== Release ==
The film was released at Liberty Cinema, Bombay, on 30 November 1956.

== Reception ==
=== Critical reception ===
On 25 November 1956, The Bombay Chronicle featured Madhubala on its front page as the "Sunday Star" of the week, praising her "refreshing performance" in Raj Hath.

A Times of India review, dated 2 December 1956, carried the headline: "Sohrab Modi's Raj Hath Is Gripping Costume Drama".

Writing in the January 1957 issue of Filmindia, critic Baburao Patel panned Raj Hath as "silly costume claptrap" and Sohrab Modi's worst film. He also dismissed the film's production values, dialogue, and musical score as uninspiring. Among the cast, Patel criticized Madhubala's performance as lacking intelligence or talent, and mocked Modi's theatrical acting style, remarking that "a man cannot act and will perhaps never act".

Writing about the film, Cineplot said that the story is "well-developed" and has a "convincing effect" but criticized the way Madhubala's character was written. Further, it was written that songs are "ill-placed" and the screenplay is "cluttered up". It praised the film for its direction and performances of the lead actors.

=== Box office ===
Raj Hath was the sixth highest-grossing Indian film of 1956, with a verdict of "hit". It grossed ₹1.4 crore, including a nett of ₹0.7 crore. Adjusted for inflation, its gross was equivalent to ₹152 crore.
