= Shyamchi Aai =

Autobiographical novel

Shyamchi Aai (English: Shyam's Mother) is an autobiography of social activist Sane Guruji). It is regarded as one of the greatest tributes to mother's love in Marathi literature.

== Story ==
Shyamchi Aai is an autobiography of Sane Guruji, who belonged to a Hindu family in the Konkan region of rural Maharashtra during British Raj. Sane Guruji (now an adult), fondly called Shyam during his childhood, narrates his memories to a group of children in a nightly sitting.

Chapters in the book are named ratra, ("night" in Marathi). They are named first night, second night, and so on. Every passing 5, the story takes you into the family setting in rural Konkan and its seaside landscapes with adjoining ranges of Sahyadri.

As the title suggests the central character is Shyam's mother and describes the influence she has on Shyam's life. It involves sticking to one's ideals even though one lives in abject poverty.

The narration is flamboyant and involves readers in the setting smoothly. As the story progresses, Shyam's debt-ridden family deteriorates. The communication between father and son, mother and son, and siblings is exemplary. It shows that if love is present in a person's life, the person can be content.

The book starts with Shyam's mother marrying into a wealthy family, its slow progression into debt-ridden poverty, and ends with the illness and death of his mother.

== In popular culture ==
The story was adapted into an eponymous film. The film was directed and produced by Acharya Atre. It won the President's Medal as Best Feature Film at the 1st National Film Awards ceremony.

The story was also adapted for stage dramas in Marathi. In 2012, the play was for the first time translated to English and performed at the Kashinath Ghanekar auditorium in Thane.

Yashoda - Goshta Shyamchya Aaichi is a serial about Sane's mother and her childhood.

== Translations ==
Shyamchi Aai is available in English, translated by Aaditi Kulkarni, who is a Canadian national residing in Mississauga, Ontario. The publication ceremony of the English edition was held on 22 May 2008 in Pune, India.

Another English translation by Shanta Gokhale was published by Penguin Random House on January 18, 2021.

Shyamchi Aai is available in Kannada, translated by Malati Mudakavi, a resident of Dharwad, India.
