= Vanamala (actress) =

Indian actress

- Born: 23 May 1915; Ujjain, British India
- Died: 29 May 2007 (aged 92); Gwalior, India

Vanamala or Vanmala Devi (1915-2007) was an Indian actress, appearing in many films in Hindi and Marathi. She is best known for the role of the mother in the Marathi movie Shyamchi Aai (1953), which won the Golden Lotus Award (Swarna Kamal) for Best Film at the 1st National Film Awards in 1954.

== Filmography ==
- 1965 Shree Ram Bharat Milan
- 1953 Naag Panchami
- 1953 Shyamchi Aai... Shyam's Mother
- 1948 Azadi Ki Raah Par
- 1947 Hatimtai
- 1945 Aarti
- 1945 Parinde
- 1944 Dil Ki Baat
- 1944 Kadambari (as Vanmala)
- 1944 Parbat Pe Apna Dera... Meera Devi
- 1944 Mahakavi Kalidas (as Vanmala)
- 1943 Muskurahat
- 1943 Shahenshah Akbar
- 1942 Raja Rani... Rani
- 1942 Vasantsena... Vasantsena
- 1941 Payachi Dasi... Vidya
- 1941 Sikandar... Rukhsana
- 1940 Lapandav
