= Pushpa Hans =

Indian playback singer and film actor

- Born: 30 November 1917; Fazilka, Punjab, British India
- Died: 9 December 2011 (aged 94)
- Occupations: Actor; Playback singer
- Known for: Hindi and Punjabi songs and films
- Spouse: Hans Raj Chopra
- Parent(s): Ratan Lal Kapoor; Janak Rani Kapoor
- Awards: Padma Shri; Punjabi Bhushan Award; Kalpana Chawla Excellence Award

Pushpa Hans Kapoor (30 November 1917– 9 December 2011) was an Indian playback singer and actor of the Hindi and Punjabi film industries in the 1940s and 1950s. She was known for her songs in the 1950 Hindi film, Sheesh Mahal and her acting in the 1949 film Apna Desh. She was a recipient of the fourth highest Indian civilian award of the Padma Shri.

== Early life and education ==
Hans was born on 30 November 1917 at Fazilka in Punjab of the British India to Ratan Lal Kapoor, a lawyer and Janak Rani Kapoor. Her schooling was at the local school in Fazilka, after which she studied classical music at Patwardhan Gharana of Lahore from where she graduated in music.

== Personal life ==
Kapoor was married to Hans Raj Chopra, a colonel in the Indian Army.

== Career ==
Kapoor started her career at the Lahore station of the All India Radio and subsequently entered film industry as a playback singer. Later, she also acted in many Hindu films, notably in Apna Desh, a 1949 Hindi film directed by renowned filmmaker, V. Shantaram.

The Government of India awarded her the fourth highest civilian honor of the Padma Shri, in 2007, for her contributions to cinema. She received two more awards the same year, Punjabi Bhushan Award and Kalpana Chawla Excellence Award.

== Death ==
She died at the age of 94 on 9 December 2011.

== Selected songs ==
Punjabi Songs

- Chan kithan gujaari saari raat ve
- Sari raat tera takni ha raah tarean to puchh chann wey
- Gallan dilan diyaan dila vich reh gayiyaan by shiv kumar batalvi
- Channa meri bah chhad dey
- Chunni da palla
- Lutti heer wey faqir de

Hindi Songs

- Chaman (1948) Punjabi movie
- Kaale Baadal (1950) ( Punjabi movie )
- Apna Desh (1949) act as Mohini Devi
- Sheesh Mahal (1950 act as Nalini
- Vaisakhi (1951) Punjabi movie
- Aadmi woh haay musibat se pareshan na ho
- Bedard zamaana kya jaane
- Bhoole zamaane yaad na kar yaad na kar
- Dil kisise lagaake dekh liya
- Dil-e-naadaan tujhe kya hua hai
- Koi ummeed bar nahin aati
- Meri khushiyon ke savere ki kabhi shaam na ho
- Taqdeer bananewaale ne kaisi taqdeer banaayi hai
- Tohe dil ki qasam tohe dil ki qasam
- Tu maane ya na maane
- Tum dekh rahe ho ki mite saare sahaare

== Awards and recognition ==
- Padma Shri in 2007
- Punjabi Bhushan Award
- Kalpana Chawla Excellence Award

== See also ==
- Apna Desh (1949 film)
- Sheesh Mahal (1950 film)
