= Muskurahat (1943 film) =

- Directed by: Dwarka Khosla
- Produced by: Saubhagya Pictures
- Starring: Motilal; Vanmala; Hari Shivdasani; Gope
- Music by: C. Ramchandra
- Release date: 1943
- Country: India
- Language: Hindi

Muskurahat is a Bollywood film. It was released in 1943.
