= Sharifa Bai =

Indian stage and screen actress (died 1968)

Sharifa Bai (died 1968), also known as Miss Sharifa, was an Indian stage and screen actress. She worked on the stage for Alfred and Madan Theatre, appearing in plays written by Agha Hashar Kashmiri that included Aankh ka Nasha (1924) and Dil to Pyas. According to the memoirs of Radheshyam Kathavachak, Sharifa performed the role of a courtesan in Aankh ka Nasha so effectively that she "broke all records". In a 1942 announcement for a radio interview with Sharifa, All India Radio introduced her as the former "Queen of the Hindustani Stage".

Sharifa in Mother India (1938)

In the early 1920s, Sharifa began appearing in silent films, often credited as "Sarifa". She earned wider public recognition with the growing popularity of films during the 1930s. She appeared in supporting roles in Shirin Farhad (1931), one of India's earliest sound productions, as well as Desh Deepak (1935), Hunterwali (1935), and Jailor (1938).

In 1938, Sharifa starred in the titular role of Mother India, which became a box office success. Her performance was acclaimed by critics: a reviewer for The Times of India hailed the film as a triumph for Sharifa, while Baburao Patel praised her portrayal as "a superb artistry that calls for big praise". The film ran for 82 weeks at Bombay's Opera House, and its commercial success enabled Sharifa to build a mansion in Dadar, which she named Sharifa Mansion.

Sharifa's daughter was actress Husn Bano, who later married filmmaker Aspi Irani.

== Selected filmography ==
| Year | Title | Role | Ref. |
|---|---|---|---|
| 1924 | Toorkey Hoor | | |
| 1925 | Adooray Chele | | |
| 1925 | Sansar Chakra | | |
| 1928 | Aankh Ka Nasha | | |
| 1931 | Shirin Farhad | | |
| 1935 | Desh Deepak | Iqbal's sister | |
| 1935 | Hunterwali | Krishnavati | |
| 1938 | Jailor | | |
| 1938 | Mother India | Sabita | |
