= Nastik =

Nastik may refer to:

- Nastika, Indian philosophical schools and persons that do not accept the authority of the Vedas as supreme; the word is often translated as "atheist"
- Nastik (1954 film), a 1954 Bollywood film by I. S. Johar starring Nalini Jaywant and Ajit
- Nastik (1983 film), a 1983 Bollywood film by Pramod Chakravorthy

== See also ==
- Nastic (disambiguation)
- Astika (disambiguation), antonym of nastika
