= Husn Bano =

Indian actress (1919–1977)

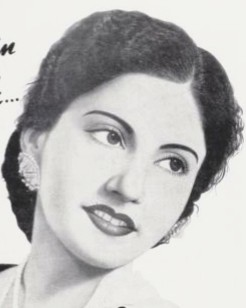
- Bano featuring in Lux advertisement, 1942
- Born: Roshan Ara; 8 February 1922; Singapore,
- Died: 1977 (Aged 58)
- Occupation: Actress
- Years active: 1934–1975
- Spouse: Aspi Irani
- Mother: Sharifa Bai

Husn Banu (1922 – 1977) was a Bollywood actress who was famous as a stunt actress after "Hanterwali Nadia" and later worked as a supporting actress in films from the 1930s to the 1970s. She was born in 1922 in Singapore.

Banu was the daughter of actress Sharifa Bai and wife of filmmaker Aspi Irani.

== Early life ==
Husn Bano was born as Roshan Ara on 8 February 1922, in Singapore. She was the daughter of actress Sharifa Bai (1930s) and the aunt of actress Nazima. She was admitted to a high school in Mumbai and passed the 12th standard from there. She was fluent in English, Gujarati, Marathi, Urdu, Bengali, and Hindi. She was also proficient in singing and dancing.

== Career ==
Like her mother, Husn Banu started her career in Calcutta. She began her career under the direction of Nitin Bose in the New Theatres film Daku Mansoor with actresses Umasashi and K. L. Saigal in the lead role in 1934. The cast of the film included: K. L. Saigal, Uma Shashi, Prithviraj Kapoor, Husnbanu, Pahari Sanyal and Nemo. Daku Mansoor was Banu's debut film. Her mother, Sharifa, was not happy with the payments of New Theatres and brought her to Bombay where Husn Bano started getting roles in Wadia films. However, only C grade stunt action films were offered to her.

After 1940, she successfully gained roles in two social films made by Bharat Laxmi films. In 1941, she acted in two films from Bhavnani Productions and National Studios. Thereafter, she only gained small or side roles.

In 1941, Husn Banu was selected for a film named Dhandora opposite Noor Mohammad Charlie in the main role.

The movie named Jawani (1942) is her career's best film as an actress. She sang in Prem Nagar (1940) which was Naushad's debut film as a music director.

Husn Bano was one of the first actresses to whom famous singer Noor Jehan (who later went to Pakistan after independence in 1947) lent her voice in the film Dost in 1944.

She worked in films in both lead and character roles until her death in 1977. Her last film was Akhari Sajda.

Husn Bano acted in about 53 films and sang 44 songs across16 films in her lifetime.

== Personal life ==
She married Wadia's director Aspi Irani with whom she had a longtime affair. She built a big house named after her mother Sharifa, ‘Sharifa Manzil’ in Dadar, Bombay.

On the morning of 23 November 1986, her husband Aspi Irani left home for work and disappeared. He was declared a “missing person” by the police and never returned.

Husn Banu was considered to be so beautiful and glamorous that she was featured in a Lux Soap advertisement in the early 1940s.
