= Kundan (film) =

- Directed by: Sohrab Modi
- Written by: Pandit Sudarshan (screenplay)
- Produced by: Sohrab Modi
- Starring: Sohrab Modi; Sunil Dutt; Nimmi
- Cinematography: M. N. Malhotra; Lateef; Bhandare
- Edited by: P. Balchandra
- Music by: Ghulam Mohammed
- Production company: Minerva Movietone
- Release date: 1955
- Running time: 121 minutes
- Country: India
- Language: Hindi

Kundan is a 1955 Indian Hindi-language social drama film produced and directed by Sohrab Modi for Minerva Movietone. The film stars Sohrab Modi, Sunil Dutt, Nimmi, Pran, Om Prakash, Kumkum, Naaz, Murad, Ulhas, Manorama. The Screenplay was by Pandit Sudarshan, with dialogues by Munshi Abdul Baqui and Pandit Sudarshan. The music was composed by Ghulam Mohammed, with lyrics by Shakeel Badayuni. Nimmi's double role in the film as mother and daughter was acclaimed critically, while Ulhas won a nomination in the Filmfare Award for Best Supporting Actor category.

Based on Victor Hugo's 1862 novel, Les Misérables, the film had Modi playing a poverty-stricken young man who gets into trouble with the police for stealing a loaf of bread. Over the years, he avoids a policeman who is on his trail even as he tries to live an honest life.

== Plot ==
The film starts with Kundan stealing a loaf of bread from a kitchen and running home with it to feed his young niece Radha, and ailing mother. He is arrested, and in court he says that he had tried to find work, begged, and in the end was forced to steal. The judge sentences him to two years in prison. His niece visits him in jail telling him of his mother's death. Kundan bends the iron rods and escapes, but is caught. He is imprisoned for a further five years for trying to escape. The second time he tries to do so, he gets an additional seven years. Kundan spends a total of fourteen years in prison doing hard labour. Radha is married to Gopal and they have a baby girl Uma. Gopal, who is in bad company, and a crook get her to part with all her jewellery and he disappears with it. Radha and her baby find refuge with a tea-stall owner and his wife, who employ her to work for them for minimal wages. Kundan, on release from jail, sets out to find Radha. He has been told by the jail authorities, including Inspector Sher Singh, a devout policeman, to keep them informed about his whereabouts and to present himself regularly at the police station. When he returns to his locality, he is unable to find Radha, and the neighbours drive him away, calling him a dacoit.

Kundan, on being turned away by everyone, finally finds a saviour in Gurudev, a priest, who helps him find himself and introduces him to making pottery and earning money. Kundan does well for himself and meets up with Radha and Uma. Radha dies from an illness and Kundan brings up Uma. Inspector Sher Singh meanwhile, is after him all the time. A grown Umanmeets Amrit, a freedom fighter involved in the Quit India Movement against the British. Amrit and Uma fall in love, but Amrit has the police after him. In a fight between the revolutionaries and the police, Sher Singh is imprisoned by them, but subsequently let free by Kundan. Amrit gets injured and Singh tries to arrest him. Kundan knocks the policeman down and escapes through a drainage with Amrit. When the Inspector comes looking for them again, there is a confrontation between Kundan and the Inspector while Amrit lies wounded. Kundan tells Sher Singh that he will give himself up to the police if he allows Amrit to get treatment. Sher Singh agrees to let Amrit's wounds be treated and waits as the doctor attends him. When Amrit recovers, Kundan goes down to find a note written by the Inspector, in which he states that he's letting two people wanted by the police to go free, hence his only salvation for not doing his duty is to kill himself. Kundan manages to see the Inspector jumping into the river. Amrit and Uma are reunited with a repentant Gopal asking Kundan's forgiveness.

== Cast ==
- Sohrab Modi as Kundan (based on Jean Valjean
- Sunil Dutt as Amrit Rai (based on Marius Pontmercy)
- Nimmi as Radha (based on Fantine) / Uma (based on Cosette)
- Pran as Gopal
- Om Prakash as Uma's Foster Father (based on Monsieur Thénardier)
- Manorama as Uma's Foster Mother (based on Madame Thénardier)
- Ulhas as Inspector Sher Singh (based on Inspector Javert)
- Murad as Gurudev
- Kumkum
- Naaz as young Radha / Uma

== Awards ==
Ulhas was nominated for Filmfare Award for Best Supporting Actor.

== Soundtrack ==
The film had music directed by Ghulam Mohammed, with the lyrics written by Shakeel Badayuni. The playback were provided by Mohammed Rafi, Lata Mangeshkar, Manna Dey, Geeta Dutt, S. D. Batish, Mubarak Begum and Sudha Malhotra.

=== Song list ===
#	Title	Singer
1	"Naujavano Bharat Ki Taqdir Bana Do"	Mohammed Rafi
2	"Shikayat Kya Karun Donon Taraf Gam Kaa Fasana Hai"	Lata Mangeshkar
3	"Jahan Wale Hamein Duniya Mein"	Lata Mangeshkar
4	"Meri Aankhon Ke Tare Mere Dil Ke Sahare"	Lata Mangeshkar
5	"Yeh Baharon Ke Din, Yeh Suhana Sama"	Lata Mangeshkar, Mohammed Rafi
6	"Matwale O Matwale Naino Ke Teer"	Lata Mangeshkar, Shamshad Begum
7	"Hosh Mein Aao Murakh Bande"	Manna Dey
8	"Meri Jaan Gair Ko Tum Paan Khilaya"	Mohammed Rafi, Geeta Dutt
9	"Aao Hamare Hotal Mein"	S. D. Batish, Sudha Malhotra
10	"Mera Bhola Balam"	Mubarak Begum

== See also ==
- Adaptations of Les Misérables
