= Vahininchya Bangdya =

1953 film

- Directed by: Shantaram Athavale
- Written by: Y. G. Joshi
- Produced by: Sadashiv J. Raokavi
- Starring: Sulochana Latkar; Vivek; Madhav Vaze; Shantaram Athavale
- Cinematography: Vasant Beltangadi
- Edited by: Madhav Kamble
- Music by: Sudhir Phadke
- Production company: Chitrasahkar
- Release date: 4 August 1953
- Country: India
- Language: Marathi

Vahininchya Bangdya (transl. Sister-in-law's bangles) is a 1953 Indian Marathi language film, directed by Shantaram Athavale and written by Y. G. Joshi. The film stars Sulochana Latkar, Vivek, Madhav Vaze and Athavale. The film focuses on a loving sister-in-law who raises her younger brother-in-law with devotion, similar to a mother, navigating family dynamics and sacrifices.

== Plot ==
The story revolves around Vasu, a young man who grows up without experiencing a mother’s love. Having never even seen his mother, he carries a deep emotional emptiness throughout his life.

Vasu shares a close bond with his elder brother, Dada. When his brother gets married, his sister-in-law, Vahini enters the family and gradually becomes a motherly figure in his life. Through her affection, care, and unconditional love, Vasu finally experiences the warmth and emotional support he had always longed for.

As the story progresses, the film explores the emotional relationship between Vasu and his sister-in-law, highlighting themes of love, sacrifice, and family bonds. The narrative conveys the idea that even when people are no longer physically present, the love they leave behind continues to remain with us forever.

== Cast ==
- Sulochana Latkar as Vahini
- Vivek as Vasu
  - Madhav Vaze as Young Vasu
- Shantaram Athavale as Dada
- Chitra as Prabha
- Indira Chitnis as Vasu's mother-in-law
- Dhumal as Vasu's father-in-law
- Sharad Sarpotdar as Vasu's eldest son
- Diwakar as Vasu's youngest son

== Soundtrack ==
Vahininchya Bangdya

Soundtrack album by Sudhir Phadke
- Released: 1953
- Genre: Feature film soundtrack
- Length: 17:56
- Language: Marathi
- Label: Classic Marathi

Official audio
- Vahininchya Bangdya- Full Album on YouTube

All music is composed by Sudhir Phadke

Track listing
No.	Title	Lyrics	Singer (s)	Length
1.	"Tu Nastis Tar"	Shantaram Athavale	Sudhir Phadke	3:00
2.	"Gruhastachya Angnat"	Shantaram Athavale	Mohantara Ajinkya	1:38
3.	"Deva Tujhi Athavan Hote"	Shantaram Athavale	Mohantara Ajinkya	3:03
4.	"Radu Nako Re Chimnya Bala"	Shantaram Athavale	Mohantara Ajinkya	2:34
5.	"Sapadle Re Sapadle"	Shantaram Athavale	Pramodini Desai	1:56
6.	"Bhagyvati Me Ga"	Shantaram Athavale	Mohantara Ajinkya	2:52
7.	"Don Nayananche Hitguj Zale"	Shantaram Athavale	Asha Bhosle	2:48
Total length:				17:56

== Reception ==
The film was a commercial success and ran for 25 weeks in 25 theatres. Director Athavale also completed the film in just 35 days, from the muhurat shot to the censor certification. The film was adapted in Hindi as Bhabhi Ki Chudiyan directed by Sadashiv J. Raokavi. Sulochana had stated that Vahininchya Bangdya was one of her most favourite films from her acting career.
