= Sohrab Modi =

Indian actor, director and producer 1897 - 1984)

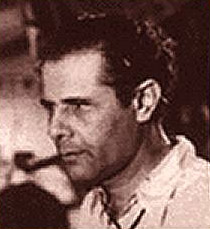
- Modi in 1931
- Born: Sohrab Merwanji Modi; 2 November 1897; Bombay, Bombay Presidency, British India
- Died: 28 January 1984 (aged 86); Bombay, Maharashtra, India
- Organization: Minerva Movietone
- Notable work: Pukar, Sikandar, Prithvi Vallabh, Jhansi Ki Rani, Mirza Ghalib, Raj Hath, Nausherwan-E-Adil
- Spouse: Mehtab (m. 1946)
- Awards: Dadasaheb Phalke Award (1980)

Sohrab Merwanji Modi (2 November 1897 – 28 January 1984) was an Indian stage and film actor, director and producer. His notable films include Khoon Ka Khoon (1935), a version of Shakespeare's Hamlet, Sikandar, Pukar, Prithvi Vallabh, Jhansi ki Rani, Mirza Ghalib, Jailor and Nausherwan-E-Adil. His films always carried a message of strong commitment to social and national issues.

== Early life ==
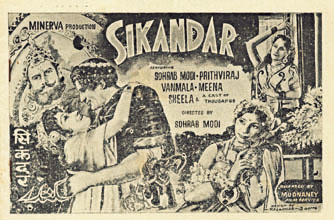
Sohrab Modi in film Sikandar (1941).

Sohrab Merwanji Modi was born 2 November 1897 in Bombay. Born into a Parsi family, he was one of 12 children. His father was an Indian civil servant. He spent his childhood in Rampur, Uttar Pradesh where he developed a liking for Hindi and Urdu languages. After finishing school, he became travelling exhibitor in Gwalior with his brother Keki Modi. At 16 he used to project films in Gwalior's Town Hall and at 26 set up his Arya Subhodh Theatrical Company.

Sohrab began as a Parsi theatre actor with some experience in silent films. He earned quite a reputation as a Shakespearean actor, travelling throughout India with his brother's theatrical company and enjoying the tremendous sense of fulfillment every time the curtain came down and the audience applauded. However, with the advent of the sound film in 1931, theatre was declining. To rescue this dying art, Modi set up the Stage Film Company in 1935. His first two feature films were adapted from theatre plays. Khoon Ka Khoon (1935) was an adaptation of Hamlet and marked Naseem Bano's acting debut. The second, Said-e-Havas (1936) was based on Shakespeare's King John. Both films failed at the box office.

== Personal life ==
After his relationship with Naseem had run its course (though she continued to work with him in Sheesh Mahal (1950) and Nausherwan-e-Adil (1957)), Sohrab married Mehtab, an actress 20 years his junior, on her birthday on 28 April 1946. Sohrab was 48 years old at that time. Mehtab was born into an aristocratic Muslim family from Gujarat and made her acting debut in Sohrab's directorial, Parakh (1944). They had a son, Mehelli, from this marriage who settled in the UK in 1967, where he would later found the British arthouse DVD label Second Run. Mehtab had a son, Ismail, from her first marriage, who lived with them.

Sohrab's elder brother informed him about Sri Ramakrishna Paramahamsa, who had died by then. He sought spiritual advice from Holy Mother Sri Sarada Devi to realise God. Holy Mother instantly gave him Mantra Diksha finding him a worthy recipient. Holy Mother initiated Sohrab in his early years of life at Udbodhan in Calcutta.

== Biography ==
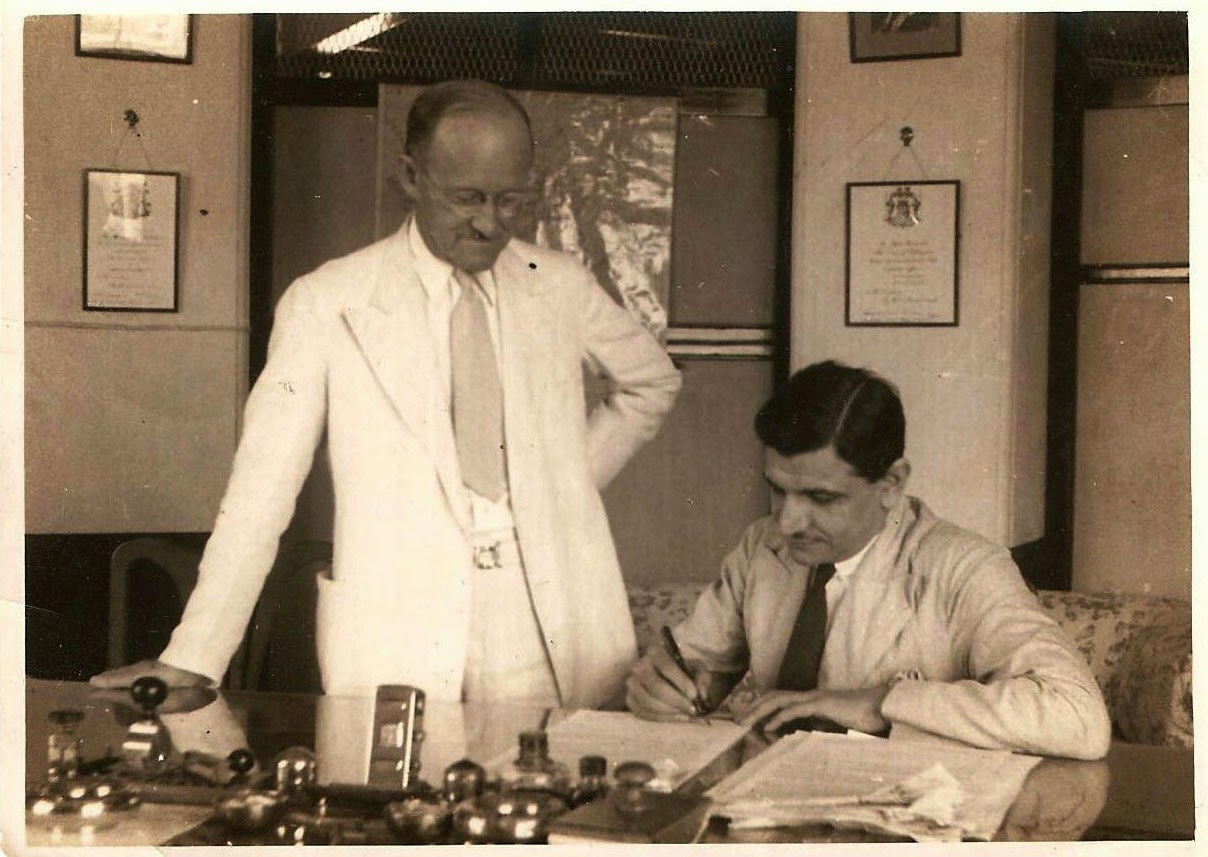
Modi in 1937

He launched Minerva Movietone in 1936. His early films at Minerva dealt with contemporary social issues such as alcoholism in Meetha Zaher (1938) and the right of Hindu women to divorce in Talaq (1938). Though the films did well financially, what attracted Modi was the history genre. Minerva Movietone became famous for its trilogy of historical spectaculars that were to follow – Pukar (1939), Sikandar (1941) and Prithvi Vallabh (1943), wherein Modi made the most of his gift for grandiloquence to evoke historical grandeur.

Pukar (1939) was set in the court of the Mughal Emperor Jehangir and is based on an incident, perhaps fictional, that highlights Jehangir's fair sense of justice. Many of the key scenes were filmed on location, at the magnificent courts and palaces from the Mughal era, which gave the film an authenticity that studio built sets could never achieve. The charisma of its stars, Chandra Mohan and Naseem Bano, and Kamaal Amrohi's oration, with its literary flourish and innate grace, ensured the film's popularity.

Arguably Modi's greatest film was Sikander (1941), which immortalized Prithviraj Kapoor playing the title role. This epic film was set in 326 BC when Alexander the Great, having conquered Persia and the Kabul Valley, descends on the Indian border at Jhelum and encounters Porus (Modi), who stops the Macedonian's advance with his troops. Sikander's lavish mounting, huge sets, and production values equalled Hollywood's best, particularly in its rousing and spectacular battle scenes. The movie was rated by a British writer as "well up to the standard of that old masterpiece The Birth of a Nation." Its dramatic, declamatory dialogue gave both Prithviraj Kapoor and Sohrab Modi free rein to their histrionic proclivities.

The release of the film coincided with World War II at its peak and in India the political atmosphere was tense following Gandhiji's call to Civil Disobedience. Sikander further aroused patriotic feelings and national sentiment. Thus, though Sikander was approved by the Bombay censor board, it was later banned from some of the theatres serving army cantonments. However, its appeal to nationalism was so great and direct, it remained popular for years. It was revived in Delhi in 1961 during the Indian March into Goa.

Prithvi Vallabh was based on K.M. Munshi's novel of the same name. The film's major highlights were the confrontations between Modi and Durga Khote, the haughty queen Mrinalvati, who tries to humiliate him publicly but then falls in love with him.

Although Modi went beyond Parsee theatre with such themes as illicit passion (Jailor (1938), remade in 1958) and incest (Bharosa (1940)), his formal approach still remained tied to the theatre. He re-created the look and sound of Parsee theatre by using frontal compositions and staging the narrative in spatial layers with copious use of Urdu dialogue.

In 1950, when Sohrab Modi's Sheesh Mahal was being screened at Minerva Theatre in Bombay, Modi noticed a man sitting in the front row with closed eyes. Upset with such a reaction, he asked an attendant to let the viewer out and to return his money. The employee came back to say that the person was blind but had come just to hear Sohrab Modi's lines.

For Jhansi Ki Rani, India's first technicolour film, Modi had technicians flown in from Hollywood. Mehtab starred as the young queen of Jhansi who took up arms against the British during the Mutiny of 1857 with Modi playing the role of the Rajguru, her chief advisor. The film was notable for its authenticity in creating the right period and delineating historical events, its spectacular battle scenes and Mehtab's stirring performance though she was far too old for the role. She achieves stirring dignity in the role as she vows to protect Jhansi from all enemies both within and outside. The ball sequence in Jhansi's palace was superbly shot and Modi's characters held great emotional appeal. The film failed to connect with the audience and was a costly misfire for Modi as a box office crash.

Modi however bounced back with Mirza Ghalib (1954). The film, based on the life of the great Indian poet who lived during the reign of Bahadur Shah Zafar, the last of the Mughal Emperors, won the President's Gold Medal for Best Feature Film of 1954. The film beautifully captured the mood of the period, its hedonistic pursuits and the fading magnificence of the court of the last Mughal, where poets like Zauq, Momin, Tishna, Shefta and Ghalib assembled to recite their verse. Mirza Ghalib also saw Suraiya's finest dramatic performance as she embodied the role of the married Ghalib's lover, a courtesan. Ghalib also saw some of her finest singing – "Aah ko Chaihiye Ek Umar," "Nuktacheen Hai Gham-e-Dil," "Dil-e-Nadaan Tujhe Hua Kya Hai," "Yeh Na Thi Humari Kismet,". Her singing is to date regarded as the definitive portrayal of Ghalib. In fact India's then Prime Minister Jawaharlal Nehru paid her the ultimate compliment by telling her she had brought Mirza Ghalib to life. ("Tumne Mirza Ghalib ki Rooh ko Zinda Kar Diya").

Though Nausherwan-e-Adil and Samay Bada Balwan (1969) had their moments it is said that Modi's later films did not reach the heights of his earlier work. In Jailor (1958), Modi gave a chilling portrayal of a rational man turned into a tyrant. His last few hits included Kundan (1955), Raj Hath (1956) and Meri Biwi Mere Bachche (1960).

== Later life ==
Even after he stopped making films, Sohrab Modi never actually gave up the idea of making one. Even as late as 1982 (when he was 85 years old) and was hardly able to move around, he had the muhurat of Guru-dakshina. As per his wife, people took advantage of his weakness for making a film and they lost a lot of money by way of advance payments, since two days after the 'muhurat', Sohrab fell sick and then never recovered. His wife also said in a 1986 interview that Sohrab was obsessed with filmmaking and, in fact, had no other interests.

Sohrab Modi received the Dadasaheb Phalke Award in 1980. He was the tenth recipient of the award. He suffered from cancer of the bone marrow and succumbed to the disease on 28 January 1984, at the age of 86.

== Trivia ==
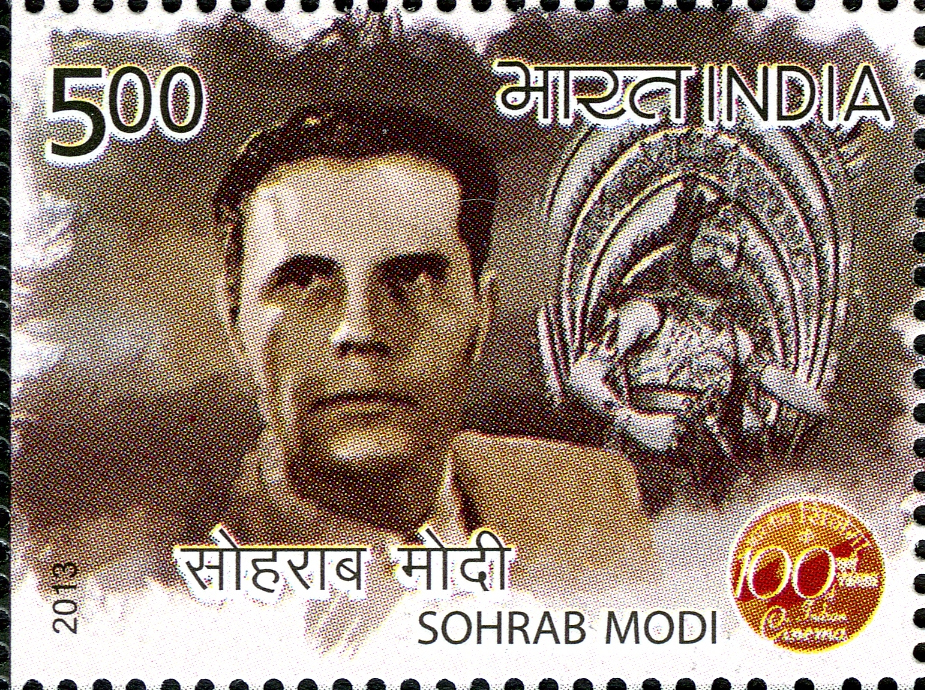
Sohrab Modi on a 2013 stamp of India

- In 1960 he was a member of the jury at the 10th Berlin International Film Festival.

== Filmography ==
=== As director ===
- Khoon Ka Khoon (1935)
- Said-e-Havas (1936)
- Atma Tarang (1937)
- Khan Bahadur (1937)
- Jailor (1938)
- Meetha Zahar (1938)
- Pukar (1939)
- Bharosa (1940)
- Taj Mahal (1941)
- Sikandar (1941)
- Phir Milenge (1942)
- Prithvi Vallabh (1943)
- Parakh (1944)
- Ek Din Ka Sultan (1945)
- Manjhdhar (1947)
- Narasinha Avatar (1949)
- Daulat (1949)
- Sheesh Mahal (1950)
- Jhansi Ki Rani (1953)
- Mirza Ghalib (1954)
- Kundan (1955)
- Raj Hath (1956)
- Nausherwan-E-Adil (1957)
- Jailor (1958)
- Mera Ghar Mere Bachche (1960)
- Samay Bada Balwan (1969)
- Meena Kumari Ki Amar Kahani (1979)

=== As actor ===
Film	Year	Role
Khoon Ka Khoon	1935	Hamlet
Said-e-Havas	1936	Kazal Beg (Hubert)
Jailor	1938	Jailor
Meetha Zahar	1938	
Pukar	1939	Sardar Sangram Singh
Sikandar	1941	King Porus
Prithvi Vallabh	1943	Munja
Sheesh Mahal	1950	Thakur Jaspal Singh
Jhansi Ki Rani	1952	Raj Guru
Kundan	1955	Kundan
Raj Hath	1956	Raja Babu
Nausherwan-E-Adil alias Farz Aur Mohabbat	1957	Sultan-e-Iran Nausherwan-e-Adil
Yahudi	1958	Ezra, the Jew
Jailor	1958	Dilip
Pehli Raat	1959	
Woh Koi Aur Hoga	1967	
Noor Jahan	1967	Kazi
Murder on Highway	1970	
Jwala	1971	
Ek Nari Ek Brahmachari	1971	Raisaheb Surajbhan Chaudhary
Razia Sultan	1983	Vazir-e-Azam
