= Apna Desh (1949 film) =

- Directed by: V. Shantaram
- Written by: Diwan Sharar
- Screenplay by: Diwan Sharar
- Story by: Keshavrao Date; Diwan Sharar
- Produced by: Rajkamal Kalamandir
- Starring: Pushpa Hans; Umesh Sharma; Chandrashekhar; Manmohan Krishna
- Cinematography: V. Avadhoot
- Edited by: Babu Marwad
- Music by: S. Purushottam
- Production company: Rajkamal Kalamandir
- Distributed by: Rajkamal Kalamandir
- Release date: 1949
- Running time: 121 minutes
- Country: India
- Language: Hindi

Apna Desh (Our Country) is a 1949 Hindi social drama film set against the backdrop of Partition and directed by V. Shantaram for his Rajkamal Kalamandir banner.

The story was written by Diwan Sharar and Keshavrao Date. Sharar also wrote the screenplay and dialogue along with acting in the film. Music was by S. Purshottam and lyrics were by Diwan Sharar and Mirza Ghalib. The cast included Pushpa Hans, Umesh Sharma, Sudha Apte, Chandrashekhar, Manmohan Krishna, Keshavrao Date, Krishna Goel, Diwan Sharar, Parshuram and Satish Vyas.

The film was made a year after Shantaram made Dr. Kotnis Ki Amar Kahani (1946), which was not a success at the box office. Apna Desh is the story of revenge by an abducted woman after the rejection she faces when she meets her family. Using the Partition as background, the film's theme focussed on black-marketing.

== Plot ==
Mohini a Hindu Punjabi girl, is living with her family when the Partition riots break out. In the melee while her family escape their home, which now becomes part of Pakistan, and go to India, she is kidnapped and raped by some Muslim rioters. After undergoing several harrowing experiences, Mohini manages to come to India and locate her family. Her family and society is unwilling to accept her in their midst. Determined to get revenge on the society that has boycotted her, she becomes a smuggler and gets into the black-marketing business. She sends ammunition to Pakistan smuggled in crates that have music instruments. Mohini soon becomes involved with another refugee, Satish. When Satish is implicated in the smuggling racket, Mohini admits her role in the business and surrenders to the police.

== Cast ==
- Pushpa Hans as Mohini Devi
- Umesh Sharma
- Chandrashekhar
- Keshavrao Date
- Manmohan Krishna
- Sudha Apte
- Krishna Goel
- Parshuram
- Satish Vyas
- Dewan Sharar

== Review and reception ==
Shantaram made socially relevant films and in Apna Desh he dealt with the issues of abduction, rape and black-marketing during, and following Partition. The film "predicted" problems like languages, black-marketing and corruption that India would face following the "newly acquired independepence". In a searing indictment of the wrongdoers, the judge calls the black-marketeers "padhe-likhe daku, samaaj ke chor, azaadi ke lootere, desh ke dushman [educated thugs, thieves of society, looters of freedom, enemies of the state]", labelling them traitors or "desh ke gaddaar".

The story caused a backlash of criticism from all the reputed papers and magazines and had to be eventually withdrawn from theatres. Baburao Patel's Filmindia in the 1949 issues had readers writing in to ask for a ban on the film and calling it "Apna Trash" (Our Trash). The magazine referred to the fact that the film was passed by the censors due to Shantaram's initiation into the censor board by Morarji Desai, who was the then Home Minister to the Government of Bombay. The magazine also hinted at the story being given the finishing touch by Desai. However, Apna Desh is cited as a film of "exceptional merit" and one of Shantaram's successful films.

Shantaram's other two socials completing his trilogy of socially relevant films during this phase were, Surang (1953) on quarry workers, and Teen Batti Char Rasta (1953) "advocating harmony" among the different states and religions of India.

Telugu and Tamil versions of the film were also released, called Nam Naadu (1949).

== Soundtrack ==
=== Hindi Songs ===
The film's music composer was S. Purushottam. He had also sung songs for Hindi films like Billi (1949) and Meri Bhabhi (1948). The lyrics were by Dewan Sharar and Mirza Ghalib and the background music was scored by Vasant Desai. The singers were Manmohan Krishna, Umesh Sharma, Pushpa Hans and Purushottam.

#	Title	Singer	Lyricist
1	"Apna Desh Hai Apna Desh"	Manmohan Krishna	Dewan Sharar
2	"Jai Hind Kaho Jai Hind Dekho Apne Tirange Mein"	Umesh Sharma	Sharar
3	"Tujhe Dil Ki Kasam Tohe Dil Ki"	Pushpa Hans	Sharar
4	"Bedard Zamaana Kya Jaane"	Pushpa Hans	Sharar
5	"Hua Karti Hai Ik Uljhan Si Dil Mein"	Purushottam	Sharar
6	"Dil Gawa Baithe Dil Lagaane Se"	Purushottam	Sharar
7	"Meri Khushiyon Ke Savere Ki Kabhi Shaam Na Ho"	Pushpa Hans	Sharar
8	"Dil-e-Naadan Tujhe Hua Kya Hai"	Pushpa Hans	Ghalib
9	"Koi Ummeed Bar Nahin Aati"	Pushpa Hans	Ghalib

=== Tamil Songs ===
The film's music composer was G. Govindarajulu Naidu and the lyrics were by Rajagopla Iyer. The singers are M. L. Vasanthakumari, S. Rajam and Mayilsamy.

No.	Song	Singers	Lyrics	Length (m:ss)
1	"Mosam Pogadhe Nee"	M. L. Vasanthakumari	Rajagopla Iyer	03:06
2	"Enthan Mana Ullaasam"	M. L. Vasanthakumari	Rajagopla Iyer	03:06
3	"Enadhu Ennam Veene"	M. L. Vasanthakumari	Rajagopla Iyer	
4	"Vedhanai Ilaa Logam"	M. L. Vasanthakumari	Rajagopla Iyer	
5	"Maname Enna Pedhamai"	M. L. Vasanthakumari	Rajagopla Iyer	
6	"Namadhu Naadu"	Mayilsamy and corus	Rajagopla Iyer	
7	"Kaadhal Puyal Thanil Thurumbu Pol"	S. Rajam	Rajagopla Iyer	
