= Sikandar (1941 film) =

1941 film by Sohrab Modi

Sikander
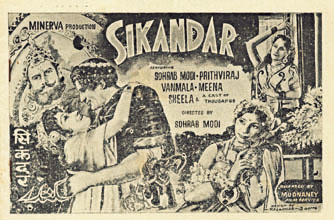
- Directed by: Sohrab Modi
- Written by: Sudarshan
- Produced by: Sohrab Modi
- Starring: Prithviraj Kapoor; Sohrab Modi; Vanmala; Zahur Raja; Meena Shorey; K. N. Singh; LalaYakub; Jilloo Bai; Noor Jehan
- Distributed by: Esquire Ltd. (Asia)
- Release date: 1941
- Running time: 146 min
- Country: India
- Language: Hindustani

Sikandar or Sikander is a 1941 epic Bollywood film directed by Sohrab Modi and starring Prithviraj Kapoor as Alexander the Great.

== Development ==
The battle sequences featuring thousands of extras along with horses, elephants and chariots were filmed in Kolhapur.

== Plot ==
The story is set in 326 B.C. The film begins after Alexander the Great (Sikander in Hindustani) conquers Persia and the Kabul valley and approaches the Indian border at Jhelum. He respects Aristotle and loves Persian Rukhsana (known in the west as Roxana). Sohrab Modi plays the Indian king Puru (Porus to the Greeks). Puru requests neighbouring kingdoms to unite against a common foreign enemy.

The story goes that when Sikander defeated Porus and imprisoned him, he asked Porus how would he like to be treated. Porus replied: "the same way a king is treated by another king". Sikander was impressed by his answer and set him free.

== Cast ==
- Sohrab Modi as Porus
- Prithviraj as Alexander
- Vanmala as Rukhsana
- Meena Shorey as Parthana (sister of Ambhi)
- Sheela as Sukhmani
- Sadiq Ali as Samar
- Shakir as Aristotle
- K. N. Singh as Raja Ambhi
- LalaYakub as Salencons
- Gagendra Singh as Emmanese
- Jilloo Bai as Sarita Rani
- Zahur Raja as Amar (son of Porus)
- Abu bakar
- Ghulam Hussein
- Noor Jehan
- Prakash
- G. S. Shorry
- Athavale

== Release ==
The release of the film coincided with World War II and the quest for Swaraj or Quit India at its peak. In India, the political atmosphere was tense, following Gandhi's call to civil disobedience. Sikander further aroused patriotic feelings and nationalistic sentiment. Thus, though Sikander was approved by the Bombay censor board, it was later banned from some of the theatres serving British Indian Army cantonments.

However, its appeal to nationalism was so great and direct, it remained popular for years. It was revived in Delhi in 1961 during the Indian march into Goa. After the movie was a huge box office success, it was dubbed and released in Persian. The music of Sikandar was composed by Meer Sahib. A prominent song was "Zindagi Hai Pyar Se, Pyar Se Bitaye Ja".

== Remake ==
It was remade in 1965 as Sikandar E Azam in color, by Kedar Kapoor, starring Prithviraj Kapoor, Dara Singh, Mumtaz, Madhumati, Helen, Prem Nath, Prem Chopra, Jeevan.

== See also ==
- List of historical drama films of Asia
