= Ulhas (actor) =

Indian character actor

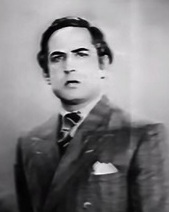
- Ulhas in Basant, c. 1942
- Born: M. N. Kaul; 1913; Ajmer, Ajmer-Merwara, British India
- Died: 14 July 1969 (aged 55–56); Bombay, Maharashtra, India
- Occupation: Actor
- Years active: 1937–1969
- Relatives: Indira Gandhi (first cousin)

Ulhas (born M. N. Kaul; 1913 – 14 July 1969) was an Indian actor, who played character roles in Hindi cinema from the late 1930s to the early 1980s. However, since he died in 1969, many of his films were released after his death.

== Personal life ==
Ulhas was born as M N Kaul at Ajmer in a Kashmiri Pandit family in the year 1913 to Chand Bahadur Kaul, who in turn was the brother of Kamla Nehru. This makes Ulhas, the first cousin of Indira Gandhi who was the third Prime Minister of India. He was also distantly related to actor Prem Adib. After completing his formal education, Ulhas left for Poona with the help of Prem Adib to try his luck in the Hindi film industry.

== Career ==
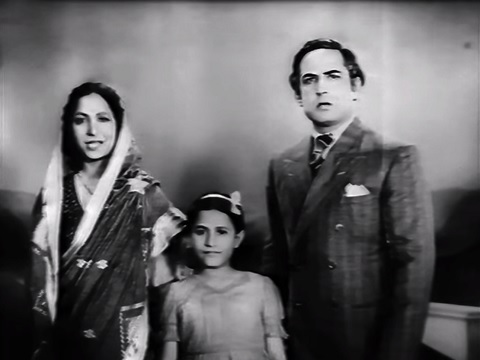
Ulhas (right) in Basant

Ulhas came to Poona in search of work in 1935. After the initial struggle, he soon got his first film titled Wahan, with the help of fellow actor Chandra Mohan, who also happened to be another Kashmiri Pandit. Wahan was being made under the banner of Prabhat Film Company headed by V. Shantaram and directed by K Narayan Kale. Ulhas came into prominence with Basant (1942) in which he was cast opposite Mumtaz Shanti. Coincidentally, another Mumtaz was signed in the film who played the role of Ulhas's daughter. This Mumtaz went on to become legendary actress Madhubala.

Even after being cast as the leading hero, Ulhas continued playing supporting roles. Some of his prominent films are Parbat Pe Apna Dera, Do Bhai, Jhansi Ki Rani, Laila Majnu, Amar, Nastik, Mirza Ghalib and Kundan. For his performance in Kundan, he was also nominated in the Best Supporting Actor category at the 3rd Filmfare Awards. A regular feature in V. Shantaram's films, he appeared in Dr. Kotnis Ki Amar Kahani, Dahej, Surang, Do Aankhen Barah Haath, Navrang and Sehra. His filmography also has films like Dil Tera Diwana, Guide, Sunghursh, Prince, Prem Pujari and Heer Raanjha.

== Death ==
Ulhas died in 1969 when many of his films were pending for their release. The film Prem Pujari refers to him as "Late Ulhas" in its credits. Ulhas's final film was Sawaal which released almost 13 years after his untimely death.

== Accolades ==
Year	Title	Category	Work	Result	Ref.
1956	Filmfare Award	Best Supporting Actor	Kundan	Nominated	

== Filmography ==
Year	Title	Role	Notes
1937	Wahan	Uttam	Debut film
1942	Basant	Nirmal	
1944	Parbat Pe Apna Dera		
1946	Dr. Kotnis Ki Amar Kahani	Dr. Basu	
1947	Do Bhai		
1950	Dahej	Lawyer Biharilal	
1952	Mamta		
1953	Jhansi Ki Rani	Ghulam Ghaus Khan	
1953	Surang		
1954	Amar	Rai Sahib Mohanlal	
1954	Laila Majnu		
1954	Mirza Ghalib	Kotwal Hashmat Khan	
1954	Nastik	Mahant Tulsiram "Pujari"	
1955	Baap Re Baap	Colonel Jung Bahadur	
1955	Kundan	Inspector Sher Singh	
1956	Raj Hath		
1957	Do Ankhen Barah Haath	Shankar Passi	
1959	Navrang		
1962	Dil Tera Diwana	Diwan Badri Prasad	
1963	Sehra	Chief Sherpal	
1965	Guide		
1965	The Guide		English film
1968	Sunghursh	Bheem	
1969	Prince	King of Ramnagar	
1970	Heer Raanjha		Posthumous release
1970	Prem Pujari		Posthumous release
1971	Jwala	King of Rampur	Posthumous release
