= Radovan Nastić =

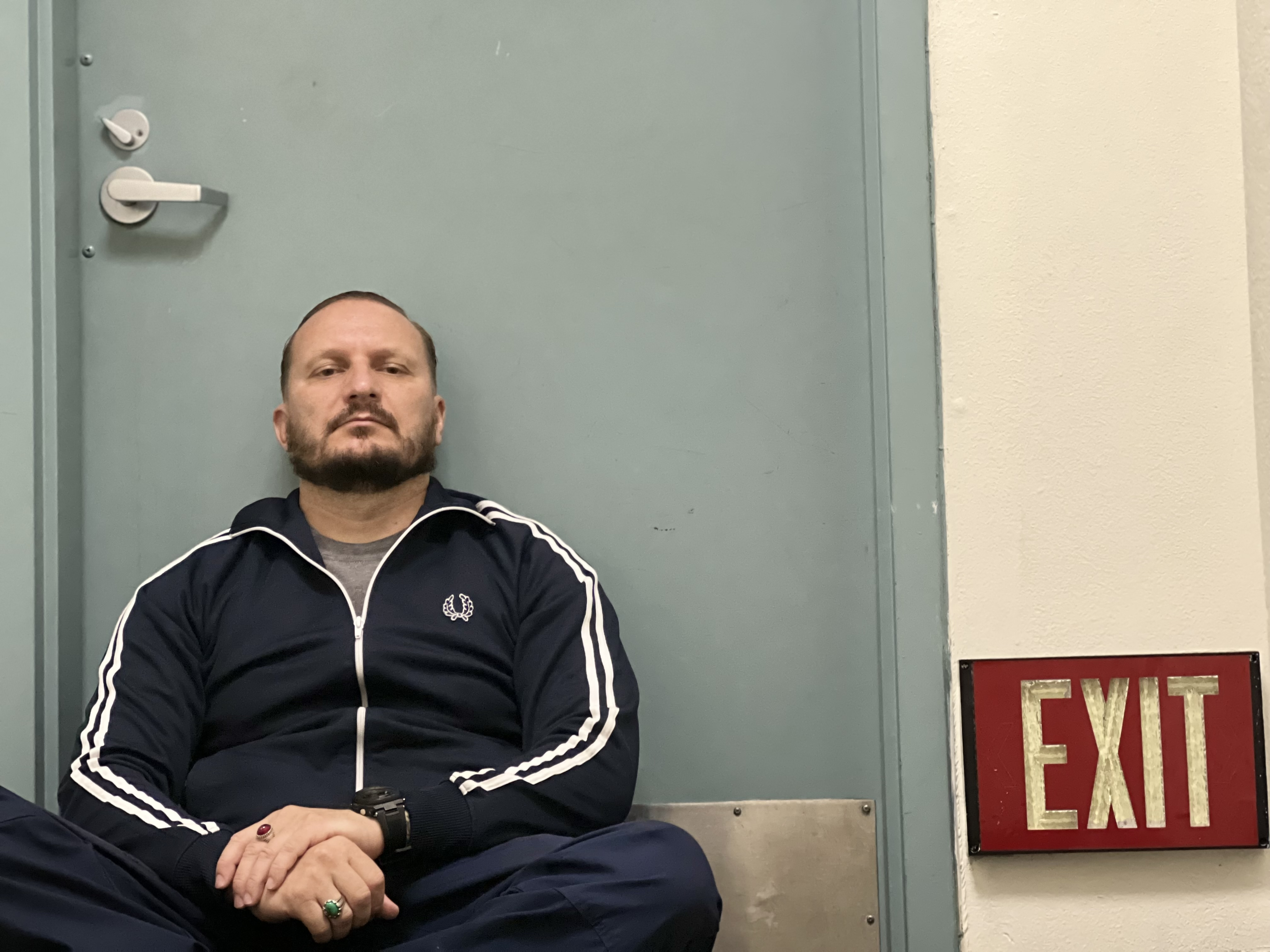

Background information
- Born: Radovan Nastić; 15 February 1975 (age 51); Belgrade, Serbia
- Occupations: Writer, journalist, photographer

Radovan Nastić (1975), also known as Bensedin, is a Serbian - American multimedia artist living in Los Angeles. Nastić’s career as an active performance artist, author, photojournalist and radio host has made him world renowned.

Nastić began his career in 1995 as a radio host on Belgrade’s B92, where he became a recognized voice of urban culture. He went on to publish Bensedin and several other avant-garde books, essays, and articles, becoming known for his bold themes and cultural critique. His work spans literature, journalism, and visual art — from the provocative Serbian National Flag artwork (2007) to international exhibitions like Hollywood Through the Haze (2021).

In recent years, alongside his creative work, Nastić has been collaborating with the several Police Departments, using empathy and communication to help de-escalate conflicts and support people struggling with addiction. Nastić is also noted for being the first Serbian author to publish a story about Merlinka, a murdered transvestite who became an urban legend.

Today, he lives and works in Los Angeles, where alongside writing he creates photographs depicting the chaos of Hollywood — broken dreams, neon scars, and people chasing ghosts. His work contains the common themes of identity, disillusionment, and the absurd theater of modern life.

https://www.nastic.art/

== Bibliography ==
- 2026 THE DIVIDED SELF - Letters from Mishima to Bogarde (fiction novel, NEW edition, lvsv, Las Vegas)
- 2026 Naselje Suncana Dolina (novel) Samizdat, Belgrade
- 2025 Summer of/f Codeine (photography book, NEW edition, lvsv, Las Vegas)
- 2025 Rachel, a love story (novel, NEW edition, lvsv, Las Vegas)
- 2025 50 (photography book, NEW edition, lvsv, Las Vegas)
- 2022 Rachel, a love story (novel, NEW edition, Portalibris, Belgrade)
- 2018 Dan kada je Mijatović pogodio prečku: holivudska priča [The day Mijatović hit the crossbar: a Story of Hollywood] (novel, Laguna, Belgrade)
- 2013 Svaki pas ima svoj dan [Every dog has its day] (novel, Prometej, Novi Sad)
- 2009 Tri dana u Kinšasi [Three Days in Kinshasa] (novel, Red Box, Belgrade)
- 2008 ...Niže nego ljudski [...less than human] (novel, Red Box, Belgrade)
- 2008 Bensedin (2nd edition, Red Box, Belgrade)
- 2008 Junaci urbane bede [Urban Poorness Heroes] (stories, Trablmejker, Belgrade)
- 2007 Rejčel - ljubavna priča [Rachel, a love story] (novel, Red Box, Belgrade)
- 2007 Balkan Twilight (novel, KC Pančevo, Pančevo)
- 2006 ...i napravim se da je sve u redu [...and I pretend everything is fine] (novel, Red Box, Belgrade)
- 2005 Bensedin (novel, Beorama, Belgrade)

== Exhibitions ==
- 2025/2026 Belgrade, Serbia - Los Angeles, US, SERB-ONA, MultiMedia Art Photography and music project.
- 2024 Belgrade, Serbia, Less than human at Kulturni Centar REX
- 2021 Zrenjanin, Serbia, Hollywood through the haze at Zrenjanin’s Cultural Center
- 2023 Belgrade, Serbia, Golić, Burić, Nastić. Three Perspectives On Time, Artget Gallery
- 2019 Hollywood - Downtown, LA, USA, Art District Street Art Fair
- 2015 Los Angeles, USA, February 20, 2015, Group Exhibition at 2nd Street Cigare Lounge and Gallery
- 2015 Los Angeles, USA, February, Group Exhibition Nu Art. New Artist at Wiznu Gallery, Street Art
- 2008 Belgrade, Serbia, 2008, Exhibition Less than human
- 2007 Zrenjanin, Serbia, Group Exhibition 30x30
