= Said-e-Havas =

- Directed by: Sohrab Modi
- Written by: Agha Hashar Kashmiri
- Produced by: Stage Film Company
- Starring: Sohrab Modi; Gulzar; Sadat Ali; E. Tarapore
- Music by: Bunyad Husain Khan
- Production companies: Minerva Movietone, Stage Film Company, Bombay
- Release date: 1936
- Running time: 150 minutes
- Country: India
- Language: Hindustani

Said-e-Havas (Prey To Desire or Greed), also known as King John, is a 1936 Hindi/Urdu film adaptation of the Shakespeare play, King John, directed by Sohrab Modi. It was based on the Urdu play Said-e-Hawas by Agha Hashar Kashmiri, published in 1908.

Produced by Modi's Stage Film Company, the film was a "stage recording" of the play, similar to Modi's first stage adaptation to screen of Khoon Ka Khoon. It was written by Agha Hashr, based on an adaptation of King John and of Richard III. The music was composed by Bunyad Husain Khan. The film stars Modi, Gulzar, Sadat Ali, Fakir Mohammed, Shama and E. Tarapore.

Trivedi and Bartholomeusz record that the film incorporated scenes and acts from King John, mainly Act 2 Scene 5, and made use of Richard III as general reference. Modi played the role of the "ethnically black" Kazal Beg (Hubert). Agha Hashr had written the play in 1907 and according to Bishop and Chaudhuri, there is very little similarity between the play King John and Agha Hashr's adaptation, except for those mentioned earlier.

== Cast ==
- Sohrab Modi
- Sadat Ali
- Gulzar
- Shama
- Chandra Kumar
- Fakir Mohammed
- E. Tarapore
- Ghulam Hussain
- Sarla Devi

== Soundtrack ==
The film had music composed by Bunyad Hussain Khan and included eleven songs.

The song "Maston Ko Ain Farz Hai Peena Sharab Ka" was sung by legendary singer G. M. Durrani.

=== Song list ===
#	Title	Singer
1	"Ae Khuda Tu Madad Kar Ab Maula"	
2	"Baat Saqi Ki Na Taali Jayegi"	
3	"Kankar Lag Jaaye More Raja"	
4	"Maston Ko Ain Farz Hai Peena Sharab Ka"	G. M. Durrani
5	"Rangraliyan Karo Khushiyan Hilmil Shaadan"	
6	"Aao Pyare Mehman Jaan-O-Dil Ke Sultan Aao"	
7	"Arre Re Re Maaro Ghoonsa Hove Bhoonsa"	
8	"Daata Tu Hai Jag Ka Paalanhar"	
9	"Majhdar Doobi Jaat Paar Karo Rab"	
10	"Falak Paar Badal Hai Chhaya Do Aalam Ka Rang Hai Badla"	
11	"Shahejamaan Malk-e-Jahan Jo Koi Chand Suraj Hai"	
