= 1st National Film Awards =

Indian ceremony celebrating cinema of 1953

- Awarded for: Best of Indian cinema in 1953
- Awarded by: Ministry of Information and Broadcasting
- Presented by: Rajendra Prasad (President of India)
- Presented on: 10 October 1954
- Site: Vigyan Bhavan, New Delhi
- Official website: dff.nic.in
- Best Feature Film: Shyamchi Aai

The 1st National Film Awards, presented by Ministry of Information and Broadcasting, India to felicitate the best of Indian Cinema released in the year 1953. Ceremony took place at Vigyan Bhavan, New Delhi on 10 October 1954 and awards were given by then President of India, Rajendra Prasad.

Instituted as State Awards for Films, which over the years known as National Film Awards, in its first year, were given in three different categories to honour the films at national level. Films made in all Indian languages were considered for the award. Awards were instituted, in order to encourage the production of the films of a high aesthetic and technical standard and educational and culture value.

Awards were categorised into three categories; Feature films, Documentaries and Children's films, where gold medal and Certificate of Merit was awarded in each category. For first two categories, Gold Medal was awarded as President's Gold Medal whereas for Children's films, it was awarded as Prime Minister's gold medal. For 1st National Film Awards, Prime Minister's Gold Medal Award for Children's film, though declared as one of the awards, was not given to any film as no film was found to be suitable.

Shyamchi Aai, a Marathi film received an honour to be the first Indian film to receive President's gold medal for the All India Best Feature Film, which now better known as National Film Award for Best Feature Film.

== Background ==
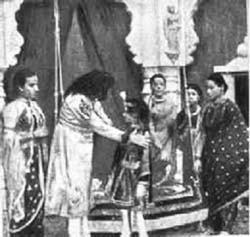
A scene from Raja Harishchandra – First Indian film

India had its first full-length motion picture when Dhundiraj Govind Phalke, popularly known as Dadasaheb Phalke directed and produced a mythological silent film – Raja Harishchandra, released on 3 May 1913, at Coronation Cinema, Mumbai. This is marked as the beginning of the Indian film industry. Though film had female characters, Phalke could not get any female to play these roles. All the female characters were also played by male artists.

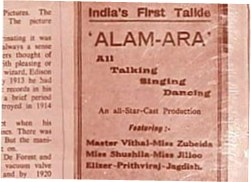
Newspaper advertisement for Alam Ara – First Indian Talkie

The release in 1931 of the first Indian talkie – Alam Ara, produced by the Imperial Film Company, marked as beginning of new era in Indian film industry. The film was released at the Majestic Cinema in Mumbai on 14 March 1931. Over the period, India produced many films and eventually became one of the largest film industries along with Hollywood and Chinese cinema.

With the increasing numbers of films being made, government brought Indian Cinematograph Act of 1918 for the censorship of the film and Central Board of Film Censors, to bring the uniformity into the film for their exhibition.

In 1949, Film Inquiry Committee was appointed by Government of India. Committee then, in one of its recommendations, recommended to institute the State Film Awards, to felicitate the films made in the country in various regional languages in order "to encourage the production of films of aesthetic and technical excellence and social relevance contributing to the understanding and appreciation of cultures of different regions of the country in cinematic form and thereby also promoting integration and unity of the nation".

== Juries ==
A committee of seven members was formed and was headed by Mangal Das Pakvasa as a chairman, for the awards to be given for the films released in the year 1953.

- Jury Members
  - Mangal Das Pakvasa (Chairperson) • Kamaladevi Chattopadhyay • Kalidas Nag • Ramdhari Singh Dinkar • B D Mirchandani • C V Desai • S A Ayer

== Awards ==
State Awards for Films were categorised into three categories; Feature films, Documentaries and Children's films.

President's Gold Medal was given in Feature films and Documentaries categories and for Children's films, it was awarded as Prime Minister's gold medal. Certificate of Merit was given in all three categories. Awards were instituted, in order to encourage the production of the films of a high aesthetic and technical standard and educational and culture value.

President's gold medal for the All India Best Feature Film is now better known as National Film Award for Best Feature Film, whereas President's gold medal for the Best Documentary Film is analogous to today's National Film Award for Best Non-Feature Film. For children's films, Prime Minister's gold medal is similar to National Film Award for Best Children's Film. Certificate of Merit in all the categories is discontinued over the years.

Following were the awards given in each category:

=== Feature films ===
Award	Film	Language	Awardee(s)	
Award	Film	Language	Producer	Director
President's gold medal for the All India Best Feature Film	Shyamchi Aai	Marathi	Pralhad Keshav Atre	Pralhad Keshav Atre
All India Certificate of Merit	Do Bigha Zamin	Hindi	Bimal Roy	Bimal Roy
All India Certificate of Merit	Bhagavan Sri Krishna Chaitanya	Bengali	Debaki Bose	Debaki Bose
All India Certificate of Merit for Best Children's Film	Khela Ghar	Bengali	Aurora Films	

=== Documentaries ===
Award	Film	Language	Awardee(s)	
Award	Film	Language	Producer	Director
President's gold medal for the Best Documentary Film	Mahabalipuram	English	Films Division	Jagat Murari
Certificate of Merit	Holy Himalayas	English	Films Division	K. L. Khandpur
Certificate of Merit	Tree of Wealth	English	Information Films of India	A. Bhaskar Rao

=== Awards not given ===
Following awards were not given as no film was found to be suitable for the award:

- Prime Minister's gold medal for the Best Children's Film

== Award gallery ==
National Film Awards – Gold Medals
President's Gold Medal for the All India Best Feature Film is now better known as National Film Award for Best Feature Film

President's Gold Medal for the All India Best Documentary Film is now better known as National Film Award for Best Non-Feature Film

Prime Minister's Gold Medal for the All India Best Children's Film is now better known National Film Award for Best Children's Film
