= Aastik =

Indian Hindi Language Film

- Release date: 1956
- Country: India

Aastik is a 1956 Hindi film starring Shahu Modak, Paro Devi and Meenakshi in lead roles. The music was composed by Narayan Dutt.

== Cast ==
- Shahu Modak
- Paro Devi
- Meenakshi
- B. M. Vyas

== Music ==
Song title	Singer(s)
"Bhagavaan Tera Insaan Dekh Le"	Mohammed Rafi
"O Jiska Sathi Hai Bhagwan"	Mohammed Rafi
"Nayan Tumhare Darash"	Mohammed Rafi
"Tera Mera Janam Ka Hai Sath Re"	Madhubala Zaveri
"Chhod Ke Duniya Ki Maya Re"	Asha Bhosle
"Ki Raat Hai"	Asha Bhosle
"O Jogi Jog Se Mat Kar Pyar"	Asha Bhosle
"Siyale Jai"	Shamshad Begum
"Naam Tera Lu To Mujhko Insan Tera"	Mohammed Rafi
