= Pukar (1939 film) =

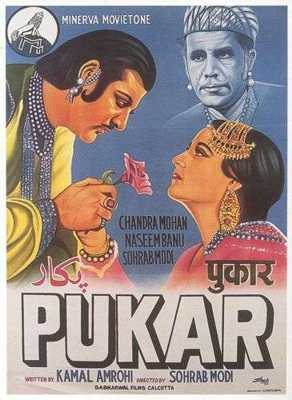
- Film poster
- Directed by: Sohrab Modi
- Written by: Kamal Amrohi; Vishnupant Aundhkar; S. Ameer Hyder
- Produced by: Sohrab Modi
- Starring: Sohrab Modi; Chandramohan; Naseem Banu
- Cinematography: Y. D. Sarpotdar
- Edited by: A. K. Chaterji; D. Shirdhankar
- Music by: S. Fernandes; Mir Saheb
- Release date: 1939
- Running time: 165 minutes
- Country: India
- Languages: Hindi; Urdu; Persian

Pukar

Pukar is a 1939 Indian film produced and directed by Sohrab Modi at the Bombay-based production house Minerva Movietone. The film is about Mughal emperor Jehangir's legendary justice and his inner conflict when his wife kills an innocent citizen by mistake.

It is a historical film with heavy and lengthy Urdu dialogues said in a loud and dramatic style. The story, dialogues and script was by Kamal Amrohi and music was composed by Mir Saheb. Pukar one of the earliest Muslim social film.

== Plot ==
Set in the court of the strict yet fair Mughal emperor Jahangir, the film tells the stories of two star-crossed lovers. The first is that of Mangal Singh and Kanwar, whose love is threatened by a violent feud between their families. The second is the well-known tale of Jahangir and Nur Jahan.

When Kanwar's brother and father accuse Mangal of dishonouring them and attack him, he kills them in self-defence. His father, the loyal Rajput chieftain Sangram Singh, captures him and Jahangir sentences him to death. The assertion that the law knows no class distinction is put to the test when a washerwoman accuses Queen Nur Jahan of inadvertently killing her husband with an arrow. As the queen believed she was acting justly when she killed the washerwoman's husband, Jahangir says that the washerwoman should shoot him in the same way, as he is the queen's husband. All the courtiers protest, but Sangram Singh says that the emperor's life belongs to the people. The washerwoman then agrees to accept financial compensation instead. Nur Jahan then suggests a general amnesty for all prisoners, which Jahangir grants to avoid her being treated as a special case. Mangal Singh and Kanwar are therefore permitted to marry.

== Cast ==
- Sohrab Modi as Sardar Sangram Singh
- Chandra Mohan as Jahangir
- Naseem Banu as Nur Jahan
- Sheela as Kanwar
- Sardar Akhtar as Rami Dhoban
- Sadiq Ali as Mangal Singh
- Babu Singh as Ramu Dhobhi

== See also ==
- Capital punishment in India
