= List of Hindi films of 1943 =

A list of films produced by the Hindi film industry based in Mumbai in 1943:

== Highest-grossing films ==
The ten highest-grossing films at the Indian box office in 1943:

Rank	Title	Nett collection
1	Kismet	₹1 crore
2	Tansen	₹70 lakh
3	Ram Rajya	₹60 lakh
4	Nadaan	₹50 lakh
5	Nauker	₹45 lakh
6	Duhai	₹40 lakh
7	Gauri	₹35 lakh
8	Hamaari Baat	₹32 lakh
9	Taqdeer	₹30 lakh
10	Ishaara	₹28 lakh

== A-D ==
Title	Director	Cast	Genre	Notes
Aabroo	Nazir	Sitara Devi, Yakub, Masud, Nazir Ahmad, Chandabai, Laddan, Jagdish Sethi	Social	Music: Pandit Gobindram Lyrics: Tanveer Naqvi, Rajjan, Hasrat Lakhnavi, Swami Ramanand Saraswati
Aadab Arz	V.C. Desai	Nalini Jaywant, Karan Dewan, Mukesh, Dulari	Social Drama	Music: Gyan Dutt Lyrics: Rammurti Chaturvedi, Pandit Indra, Kailash Matwala.
Aage Kadam	N.R. Acharya	Motilal, Anjali Devi, Mubarak, Rajkumari Shukla, Padma Bannerji, Nand Kishore, Narmada Shankar	Social	Music: Madhav Lal, Ramchandra Pal; Lyrics: Kailash Matwala
Aankh Ki Sharm	Balwant Bhatt	Prithviraj Kapoor, Trilok Kapoor, Kaushalya, Agha, Dalpat, Minakshi, Himalayawala, Nalini Gute, Nayampalli, Bibijan	Social	Music: Vasant Desai; Lyrics: Pandit Indra
Amaanat	Lalit Chandra Mehta	Harish, Husn Banu, Bhudo Advani, Sankatha Prasad, Agha, Dulari, Kayam Ali, Minakshi, Laddan, Nawab	Action	Music: Ninu Mujumdar; Lyrics: Neelkanth Tiwari
Andhera	Aspi Irani	Sitara Devi, Arun Kumar, Kesari, Rajkumari, K C Dey, M. Bhagwandas, Baby Madhubala	Social Melodrama	Music: Gyan Dutt; Lyrics: Pandit Indra
Angoori	Mahesh Kaul	Ulhas, Kaushalya, Sunetra, Angre, Dar Kashmiri	Social	Music: G. M. Durrani; Lyrics: Rammurti Chaturvedi
Andhi Duniya	Produced by Zenith Pictures	Nandrekar, Feroza Begum, B Yadav	Social	Music: Lyrics:
Angoothi	Bibhuti Mitra	Ashok Kumar, Chandraprabha, Leela Mishra, S. Nair, Prahlad, Priti Majumdar	Social	Music: Lalubhai Bhojak, Ashok Ghosh; Lyrics: Firoz Jalandhari
Ashirwad	Ramchandra Thakur	Lalita Pawar, Balwant Singh, Jilloo, Rampyari, Vatsala Kumthekar, S. B. Nayampalli, Qayam Ali	Family Drama	Music: Anna Saheb; Lyrics: Raghunath Brahmbhatt, Pandit Phani, Pandit Indra
Badalti Duniya	Mohan Sinha	Mumtaz Shanti, Trilok Kapoor, K.C. Dey, Badri Prasad, Rajkumari Shukla	Social	Music: Khan Mastana, K.C. Dey, Madhukar, Haribhai Bhojak; Lyrics: Mohan Sinha
Badla	Bhagwan	Anjali Devi, Bhagwan, Devika, C. Ramchandra, Baburao Pehlwan, Raj Kamal	Action Drama	Music: C. Ramchandra; Lyrics: Ehsan Rizvi
Bansari	Jayant Desai	Ishwarlal, Urmila, Shamim, Noor Mohammed Charlie, Dixit, Bhagwan Das, Kesari	Social	Music: Gyan Dutt; Lyrics: D. N. Madhok, Pandit Indra
Bhagta Bhoot	Ramanlal Desai	Prakash, Madhurika, Baburao Pehalwan, Firoza Begum, Mumtaz Begum, Vasantrao Pehalwan, Brajrani, Amir Bano, Mirajkar	Action	Music: Vasant Kumar Naidu; Lyrics: Ehsan Rizvi
Bhaichara	G.K. Mehta	Bharat Bhushan, Sunetra, Ansari, Himmat Rai, Veena Kumari Hadi, Ramesh Sinha, Rajinder Singh	Social	Music: Himanshu Dutta; Lyrics: Kumar Vyas, Uday Shankar Bhatt, I. C. Kapoor
Bhakta Raidas	Keshavrao Dhaiber	Paresh Banerji, Anant Marathe, Sheela, K. N. Singh, Menka Lalita Pawar	Biopic Devotional	Music: Saraswati Devi; Lyrics: Safdar Aah
Bhaktaraj	Jayant Desai	Vasanti, V. Padnis, Kaushalya, Mubarak, E. Billimoria, Dixit, Sheela, Bhagwan Das	Devotional	Music: C Ramchandra; Lyrics: D. N. Madhok
Bhalai	Nazir Ahmed Khan	Prithviraj Kapoor, Sitara Devi, Mahajbin, Kumar, S. Nazir, Gope, Ranibala	Social	Music: Pannalal Ghosh; Lyrics: Hasrat Lakhnavi
Chhed Chhad	K. Amarnath	Sitara Devi, Nazir, Gope, Rajkumari, Majid	Social	Music: Mushtaq Hussain; Lyrics: Rajjan, Tanveer Naqvi
Chhoti Maa a.k.a. Nurse	Chaturbhuj Doshi	Khursheed, Anil Kumar, Arun Kumar, Prabha, Indira, Sheikh	Family Drama	Music: Gyan Dutt; Lyrics:
Chirag	Ram Daryani	Ishwarlal, Kaushalya, Gope, Veena Kumari, Gulab	Social	Music: Khemchand Prakash; Lyrics: Wali Sahab, D. N. Madhok, Pandit Indra
Duhai	V. M. Vyas	Shanta Apte, Noor Jehan, Kumar, Zarina, Mirza Musharraf, Ansari, Kesarbai	Social	Music: Pannalal Ghosh, Rafiq Ghaznavi; Lyrics: Bharat Vyas
Dulhan	Gunjal	Shahu Modak, Maya Banerji, Yashodara Katju, Rama Shukal, Rajkumari Shukla, Sankatha Prasad, Pesi Patel, Kanhaiyalal	Family Drama	Music: Damodar Sharma; Lyrics: Pandit Indra, J.B. Mehnat, Bekal
Duniya Diwani	K. L. Khan	Ramola, E. Billimoria, W. M. Khan, Firoza Begum, Samson, Bibijan	Social	Music: K. Narayana Rao; Lyrics: Arshad Gujarati

== F-L ==
Title	Director	Cast	Genre	Notes
Fashion	S.F. Hasnain	Sardar Akhtar, Chandra Mohan, Kamta Prasad, S. Nazir, Sabita Devi. Bhudo Advani	Social	Music: Shanti Kumar; Lyrics: Arzu Lakhnavi
Gauri	Kidar Nath Sharma	Monica Desai, Prithviraj Kapoor, Raj Kapoor, Rajkumari Shukla, Shamim, Kamla Chatterjee, Nagendra, Amarnath Pasan	Social	Music: Khemchand Prakash; Lyrics: Kidar Sharma
Hamari Baat	M. I. Dharmsey	P. Jairaj, Devika Rani, Suraiya, Raj Kapoor, David, Shah Nawaz, Mumtaz Ali, Rajkumari Shukla	Social	Music: Anil Biswas; Lyrics: Narendra Sharma
Hospital a.k.a. Jogajog	Sushil Majumdar	Kanan Devi, Jawahar, Ahindra Chowdhary, Hiralal, Krishnakant, Tulsi Chakraborty, Manorama	Social	Music: Kamal Dasgupta; Lyrics: Pandit Bhushan, Pandit Madhur
Hunterwali Ki Beti	Batuk Bhatt	Fearless Nadia, John Cawas, Sardar Mansur, Dalpat, Atish Sayani, Boman Shroff, Gulab	Action	Music: Channalal Naik; Lyrics: A. Karim
Inkaar	Sudhir Sen	Leela Desai, Pahari Sanyal, Swarnalata, Jagdish Sethi, Sunalini Devi, Shahadi, Agha, Putlibai, Ghulam Rasool	Social	Music: Ashok Ghosh; Lyrics:
Ishaara	J.K. Nanda	Prithviraj Kapoor, Suraiya, Swarnlata, K. N. Singh, Vatsala Kumtekar, Jagdish Sethi, Masood, Pratima Devi	Social	Music: Khurshid Anwar; Lyrics: D. N. Madhok
Jadui Jhoola	A. M. Khan	Zebunnisa, Shiraz, Ameena, Vatsala Kumtekar, Rafiq, Ansari	Fantasy	Music: Damodar Sharma; Lyrics: Ramesh Chandra Pandey
Kanoon a.k.a. The Law		Shahu Modak, Mehtab, Badri Prasad		Music: Naushad Lyrics: Deena Nath Madhok
Kashinath	Nitin Bose	Asit Baran, Bharati Devi, Sunanda Bannerji, Dilip Bose, Manorama, Nawab Nemo, Radharani, Puttan	Social	Music: Pankaj Mullick; Lyrics: Pandit Bhushan
Khazanchi Ki Beti	Nari Ghadiali	Sharda, Yusuf Effendi, Majid, Shahadi, Dudha, Bibijan, Maqbul, Ghulam Hussain	Action	Music: K. Narayana Rao; Lyrics: Waheed Qureshi
Khooni Laash	AR Kardar	E. Billimoria, Shantarin, Baburao, Ali	Action Thriller	Music: K. Narayana Rao; Lyrics: Shewan Rizvi
Kismet	Gyan Mukherjee	Ashok Kumar, Mumtaz Shanti, Shah Nawaz, Mubarak, Chandraprabha, David, Kanu Roy, V. H. Desai	Drama	Music: Anil Biswas; Lyrics: Kavi Pradeep
Koshish	Rafiq Rizvi	Trilok Kapoor, Yakub, Husn Banu, Kalyani, Sunetra, Mirza Musharaf, Maste Nissar	Social	Music: Bashir Dehlvi; Lyrics:
Kurbani	Ram Daryani	Ishwarlal, Kaushalya, Vasanti, Durga Khote, Gope, Majid, Sheikh	Social	Music: Khemchand Prakash; Lyrics: Wali Sahab
Ladaai Ke Baad	R. S. Junarrkar	Shahu Modak, Raja Paranjpe, Snehprabha Pradhan, David, Kusum Deshpande, Sharda	Social	Music: Dadasaheb Chandekar; Lyrics: Wali Sahab
Love	Phani Majumdar	Shanta Apte, Sunalini Devi, Narhari Narayan Joshi		Music: Lyrics:

== M-N ==
Title	Director	Cast	Genre	Notes
Mahasati Ansuya	V. M. Vyas	Durga Khote, Shobhana Samarth, Shahu Modak, Gope, E. Billimoria, Rampyari	Devotional	Music: Avinash Vyas, Allah Rakha; Lyrics: Ehsan Rizvi
Mahatma Vidur	Parshwanath Yeshwant Altekar	Durga Khote, V. Pagnis, Raja Sandow, Nayampalli, Yashodhra Katju, David, Sita Jhaveri, Vasantrao Pehalwan, Kalyani Das	Devotional	Music: Harishchandra Bali; Lyrics: Narottam Vyas
Manchali	R.C. Talwar	Ramola, Jyoti Prakash, Manorama, Sunder, Ram Dulari	Social	Music: G.A. Chishtii; Lyrics: J S Kashyap, G A Chishti
Masterji	Krishna Gopal	Sardar Akhtar, Harish, Shah Nawaz, Bibijan, Veena, Leela Mishra, Shanti Patel, Syed Ahmed	Social	Music: B R Deodhar; Lyrics: Waheed Qureshi, Neelkanth Tiwari, Pandit Anuj
Mauj	Batuk Bhatt, Babubhai Mistri	Pahari Sanyal, Kaushalya, Fearless Nadia, Sardar Mansur, Agha, Nazira	Social Action	Music: Vasant Desai; Lyrics:
Mazaaq	Zahur Raja	Pahari Sanyal, Madhuri, Zahur Raja, Radharani, Haroon, Tara	Social	Music: Zahur Raja; Lyrics: Abid Gulrez
Mera Khwab	Hansraj Patel	Prakash, Zebunissa, Samson, Putlibai, Abbas	Social	Music: Ghulam Mohammed; Lyrics: M E Ashq
Mohabbat	Phani Majumdar	Pahari Sanyal, Shanta Apte, Sunalini Devi, Jagdish Sethi, Manorama, K. C. Dey, S. Nair, Yashodara Katju, Navinchandra	Romance Drama	Music: Hari Prasanna Das; Lyrics:
Mohabbat Ki Jeet	Ramanlal Desai	Fearless Nadia, Navinchandra, S Nasir, Shakir, Agha, Leela Pawar, Narhari Narayan Joshi	Action	Music: Vasant Kumar Naidu; Lyrics: Ehsan Rizvi
Mr. Jhatpat	Harbans	Radharani, E. Billimoria, Harishchandra, Dalpat, Nazira, Devasker, Bibijan	Action	Music: C. Ramchandra; Lyrics: Waheed Qureshi
Muskurahat	Ram Kamlani, Dwarka Khosla	Vanmala, Motilal, Hari Shivdasani, Ghory, Leela Mishra, Gope	Romance Drama	Music: C. Ramchandra; Lyrics: I. C. Kapoor
Nadaan	Zia Sarhadi	Noor Jehan, Masood, Nazir Maya Devi, Murad, Alaknanda, Aman, Jilloo	Social	Music: Datta Korgaonkar; Lyrics: Zia Sarhadi, Tanveer Naqvi
Nagad Narayan	Vishram Bedekar	Leela Desai, Kusum Deshpande, Pratima Devi, Baburao Pendharkar, Nayampalli, Masood, Rose, Shakir	Social	Music: Shridhar Parsekar; Lyrics:
Nai Kahani	D.D. Kashyap	Paresh Bannerjee, P. Jairaj, Rose, Nandrekar, Shalini, Chhotu, Rane	Social	Music: Shyam Sundar; Lyrics: Wali Saheb
Nai Zindagi	S. Khalil	Sheikh Mukhtar, Anees Khatoon, Yakub, Nazma, Satish, Gope, Agha, Laddan	Social	Music: Vasant Kumar; Lyrics:
Najma	Mehboob Khan	Ashok Kumar, Veena, Kumar, Yakub, Sitara Devi, Majid, Agha, Murad, Rajkumari Shukla	Muslim social	Music: Rafiqe Ghaznavi; Lyrics: Anjum Pilibhiti
Namaste	M. Sadiq, S.U. Sunny	Protima Dasgupta, Wasti, Jagdish Sethi, Rajkumari Shukla, Misra, Allauddin S.B. Nayampalli	Social	Music: Naushad; Lyrics: D. N. Madhok
Naukar	Syed Shaukat Hussain Rizvi	Chandra Mohan, Shobhana Samarth, Noor Jehan, Yakub, Balwant Singh, Mirza Musharraf, Miss Moti	Social Melodrama	Music: Rafiqe Ghaznavi; Lyrics: Shams Lakhnavi, Akhtar Sheerani, Bahadur Shah Zafar, Nazim Panipati
Naya Tarana	Najam Naqvi	P. Jairaj, Snehprapha Pradhan, Raja Paranjpe, Pratima Devi, David, Chandrika, Sharda	Social	Music: Amir Ali; Lyrics: Ali Sardar Jafri
Naya Zamana	Nanubhai Vakil	Sarojini, Rajnikant, Ghori, Benjamin, S. Nazir, Mehar Bano, Gulab, Munshi Khanjar, Rajnikant, Ghori	Drama	Music: Ramchandra Pandey, Damodar Sharma; Lyrics: Ramchandra Pandey, Ehsan Rizvi, Pandit Anuj

== O-R ==
Title	Director	Cast	Genre	Notes
Paapi	Majnu	Madhuri, Majnu, Salma, Zahur Shah, Satish Batra, Miss Iqbal	Social	Music:Pandit Amarnath, Lyrics: Aziz Kashmiri
Pagli	Shankar Mehta	Aruna Devi, Kapoor, Asha, Ramesh, Roza, Mohini, Noor Mohammed Charlie	Social	Music: Gobind Ram, Rasheed Attre; Lyrics:
Paigam	Surendra Desai	Surendra, Sadhana Bose, Anil Kumar, Ansari, Sulochana Chatterjee, Hadi, Pratima Devi, Munshi Khanjar	Social	Music: Gyan Dutt; Lyrics: Safdar Aah, Baalam Pardesi, Pandit Indra
Panghat	Mahesh Chandra, K.J. Parmar	Ratnamala, Umakant, Alaknanda, Jeevan, Leela Pawar, Sushil Kumar, M. Ismail, Jayant, Manorama	Social	Music: S. N. Tripathi; Lyrics: Pandit Indra, Ramesh Gupta
Paraya Dhan	Nitin Bose	Leela Desai, Balwant Singh, Maya Bannerjee, Jagdish Sethi, Sunalini Devi, Radharani, Rajkumari Shukla, Debi Mukherji, Baby Madhubala	Social Family Drama	Music: Gyan Prakash Ghosh; Lyrics: Rammurti Chaturvedi
Pistolwali	Nari Ghadiali	Romila, Benjamin, Atish Sayani, Bibijan, Ali, Shahzadi, Amritlal Nagar	Action	Music: K Narayana Rao; Lyrics: Mustafa Nisar
Poonji	Ravindra Dave, Vishnu Pancholi	Ragini, Ajmal, Jayant, Manorama, M. Ismail, Anwaribai	Social	Music: Ghulam Haider; Lyrics: Behzad Lakhnavi, D. N. Madhok, Shaukat Thanvi
Prarthana	Sarvottam Badami	Motilal, Sabita Devi, Nimbalkar, Sadat Ali, Kajjan, K. N. Singh, Mehboob, Menka	Social	Music: Saraswati Devi; Lyrics: Safdar Aah
Pratiggya	Nandlal Jaswantlal	Motilal, Swarnlata, Sunetra, Hari Shivdasani, Bhudo Advani, Baby Meena Kumari	Social	Music: Indravadan Bhatt; Lyrics:
Prem Sangeet	Wahid-ud-din Zia-ud-din Ahmed	P. Jairaj, Nina, Anwar, Rajkumari Shukla, W. M. Khan, Ram Avtar, H, Prakash, Gulab	Social	Music: S K Pal; Lyrics: Bharat Vyas
Prithvi Vallabh	Sohrab Modi	Durga Khote, Sohrab Modi, Meena, K. Singh, Navin Yagnik, Latika, Sankatha Prasad, Sadiq Ali, Kajjan, Al Nasir, Shanta Kumari, Amirbai Karnataki	Historical Drama	Music: Rafiq Ghanavi; Lyrics: Pandit Sudarshan
Pyara Watan	M. Udwadia	Alaknanda Benjamin, Yashwant Dave, Kalyani Das, But Kashar, Samson	Social	Music: Shyam Babu Pathak; Lyrics: Kabil Amritsari
Rahgeer	A. Rashid	Trilok Kapoor, Masood, Yakub, Zohra Sehgal, Shantarin, Shahzadi, Anwaribai, Habib	Social	Music: Khan Mastana; Lyrics: Shewan Rizvi
Raja	Kishore Sahu	Kishore Sahu, Protima Das Gupta, Moni Chatterjee, Ranibala, Ramesh Gupta, Anant Prabhu, Badri Prasad, Vijay Sahu, Gulab, Samson	Social	Music: Khan Mastana; Lyrics: Bhagwati Charan Sharma, Rammurti Chaturvedi
Ram Rajya	Vijay Bhatt	Prem Adib, Shobhana Samarth Chandrakant, Badri Prasad, Shanta Kumari, Ranjana, Madhusudan, Umakant, Yashwant, Athavale	Religious	Music: Shanker Rao Vyas; Lyrics: Ramesh Gupta
Rani	P.C. Barua	P.C. Barua, Patience Cooper, Jamuna, Johar Ganguly, Kalavati, Bikram Kapoor	Social	Music: Kamal Dasgupta; Lyrics: Pandit Madhur
Rekha	Mahendra Thakore	Leela Chitnis, Harish, Maya Banerjee, Sankata Prasad, Padma Bannerji, Moni Chatterjee	Social	Music: Damodar Sharma; Lyrics: Qamar Jalalabadi, Swami Ramanand Saraswati

== S-Z ==
Title	Director	Cast	Genre	Notes
Sahara	Jagatrai Pesumal Advani	Renuka Devi, S. D. Narang, Pran, Zahur Shah, Razia, Meena, Irshad	Social	Music: Gobind Ram; Lyrics: Qamar Jalalabadi, M.S. Sehrai, Swami Ramanand Saraswati
Salma	Nazir	Ishwarlal, Sitara Devi, Yakub, Majid, Urmila, Anwari	Social	Music: Gobind Ram; Lyrics: Hasrat Lakhnavi
Sanjog	Abdul Rashid Kardar	Mehtab, Noor Mohammed Charlie, Anwar Hussain		Music: Lyrics:
Sawaal	Niranjan	Mumtaz Shanti, Ulhas, Agha, Badri Prasad, Niranjan, Radharani, Habib	Social	Music: Pannalal Ghosh; Lyrics: Wali Sahab
School Master	Chimanlal Luhar	Karan Dewan, Gope, Sushil Kumar, Rajkumari Shukla, Jeevan, Maya Banerji, Kaushalya, M. Khanjar, Yakbal	Social	Music: Ninu Majumdar; Lyrics: Pandit Indra, Bharat Vyas
Shahenshah Akbar	G.R. Sethi	Kumar, Vanmala, K. N. Singh, Husn Banu, M. Gupte, R. Roy, Bikram Kapoor, Leela Mishra	Historical Biopic Drama	Music: Jhande Khan; Lyrics: Deewan Sharar, Jhande Khan, Arshad Gujarati, Pandit Indra
Shakuntala	V. Shantaram	Jayshree, Chandra Mohan, V. Shantaram, Ameena	Scriptural	
Shankar Parvati	Chaturbhuj Doshi	Arun Kumar, Mahipal, Sadhana Bose, Brijmala, Kamala Chatterjee, Narmada Shankar, Bhagwandas, Sulochana. Rewashankar, Rajinder Singh	Religious	Music: Gyan Dutt; Lyrics: Pandit Indra
Sharafat	C. M. Trivedi	Pahari Sanyal, Leela Desai, Moti, Agha, Jagdish Sethi, S. L. Puri, Ghulam Rasool	Social	Music: Ashok Ghosh; Lyrics:
Shri Ramanuja	Debaki Bose	Dhiraj Bhattacharya, Chhaya Devi, Tulsi Chakraborty, V. Panchotia, Bikram Kapoor, Biman Bannerji, Hiralal, Kamal Mitra	Devotional	Music: Anupam Ghatak; Lyrics: Narottam Vyas
Tansen	Jayant Desai	K. L. Saigal, Khurshid, Mubarak, Kamla Chatterji, Nagendra, Kesari, Bhagwandas	Drama, Musical, Romance	Music: Khemchand Prakash; Lyrics: D. N. Madhok, Pandit Indra
Taqdeer a.k.a. Destiny	Mehboob Khan	Motilal, Nargis, Chandra Mohan, Noor Mohammed Charlie, Jilloo, Kayam Ali, Ansari, Laddan, Maheshar Shirazi	Romantic comedy	Music: Rafiq Ghaznavi; Lyrics: Meharul Qadri
Tasveer	Najam Naqvi	Motilal, Swarnalata, Durga Khote, David, Azurie, Navin Yagnik, Devaskar, Nana Palsikar	Social	Ramchandra Pal; Lyrics: Arzu Lakhnavi
Vakil Saheb	Mohan Sinha	Trilok Kapoor, Madhuri, Shahzadi, Rajkumari Shukla, Mumtaz Begum, Badri Prasad, Munshi Khanjar	Comedy, Drama	Music: Pandit Madhukar, Annasaheb Mainkar; Lyrics: Mohan Sinha
Vijay Lakshmi	G. S. Casshyap	Motilal, Shobhana Samarth, Gope, David, Yashodhra Katju, Bhudo Advani, Leela Mishra, Mehar Bano	Social	Music: G. M. Durrani; Lyrics: J S Kashyap, Kailash Matwala, Neelkanth Tiwari
Vish Kanya	Kidar Sharma	Prithviraj Kapoor, Sadhana Bose, Surendra, Kamla Chatterjee, Amarnath, Leela Mishra, Brijmala	Costume Fantasy	Music: Khemchand Prakash; Lyrics: Kidar Sharma
Vishwas	Homi Wadia	Surendra, Trilok Kapoor, Mehtab, Sulochana Chatterjee, Gulab, Himalayawala, Nayampalli		Music: Firoz Nizami; Lyrics: Pandit Indra
Wapas	Hemchandra Chunder	Latika, Asit Baran, Dhiraj Bhattacharya, Bharati Devi, Nawab, Hiralal, Indu Mukerjee, Tulsi Chakraborty	Social	Music: R. C. Boral; Lyrics: Pandit Bhushan
Watan Farosh	Raja Yagnik	Navinchandra, Leela Pawar, Agha, Dalpat, Sardar Mansur, Munshi Khanjar, Bhagwan Das	Action	Music: Mulraj Kapadia; Lyrics: Ehsan Rizvi
Zaban	Jayant Desai	Bhagwan, Ishwarlal, Kaushalya, Vatsala Kumtekar, Dixit	Drama	Music: C. Ramachandra; Lyrics: D. N. Madhok, Anjum Pilibhiti, Ratan Piya, Saraswati Kumar Deepak, Mahir Ul Qadri
Zamindar	Moti B. Gidwani	Shanta Apte, Manorama, Khairati, Durga Mota, S. D. Narang, M. Ismail	Mystery	music: Ghulam Haider
Zameen	Anand Kumar	Khursheed, Biswas, Durga Khote, David, S. Nazir	Social	Music: Datta Korgaonkar; Lyrics:
