= K. S. Daryani =

Indian dramatist, film producer, screenwriter, director and stage actor (1899–1955)

Khanchand Shamaldas Daryani
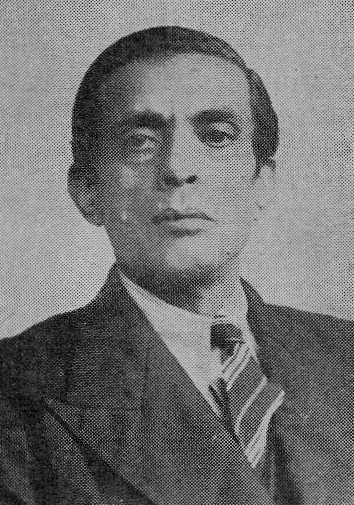
- Daryani c. mid-1940s
- Born: 1899; Hyderabad, Sindh, British India
- Died: 2 April 1955 (aged 55–56); Bombay, Maharashtra, India
- Occupations: Dramatist; film producer; screenwriter; director; stage actor
- Organization: Krishin Movietone
- Relatives: Ram Daryani (brother)

Khanchand Shamaldas Daryani (1899 – 2 April 1955) was an Indian dramatist, film producer, screenwriter, director and stage actor. Literary scholar L. H. Ajwani describes Daryani as "the most notable figure in the history of Sindhi drama and film" and credits him with being "the first to bring home to Sindhis the value of drama and its significance in the life and literature of the province".

Born in 1899 in Hyderabad, Sindh, Daryani studied at the Agricultural College, Poona (now Pune), and joined the Agricultural Department of Sind as a gazetted officer. He was active in theatre from an early age and co-founded the Rabindranath Literary and Dramatic Club (RLDC), along with M. U. Malkani, in 1923. He emerged as a prominent figure in Sindhi drama around 1923 and went on to write more than 20 plays, many addressing social issues. His major plays included Mulk-ja-Mudabar—an adaptation of Henrik Ibsen's Pillars of Society—and Bukh-jo-Shikar. Besides writing, Daryani also performed in his own plays, portraying the female leads in Gulab Jo Gul urf Devi Jo Partap and Motiye Ji Mukhri urf Anand Ji Sundari. According to R. A. Shaikh's book Filmdom, Daryani was dubbed the "Shakespeare of Sind" for his literary achievements.

Daryani became active in the Hindi film industry as a producer and screenwriter in 1933. He resigned from government service in 1938 and subsequently established the film production company Krishin Movietone along with his brother, the director Ram. Shaikh regarded Bharat Ki Beti (1934), Sangdil Samaj (1936), Zamana (1938), and Hindustan Hamara (1940) as the "outstanding successes" of Daryani's career. In 1945, Daryani wrote a book as well as produced a film based on the life of Shravana Kumara, that was released two years later. The romantic comedy Salgirah (1946) was Daryani's only directorial venture, described in a Bombay Chronicle review as an "emotional story [that] tells the modern people, what love really is, and means". In 1951, Daryani produced his final film, Tarana, which was a critical and commercial success. He died at the age of 56, in 1955, following an attack of high blood pressure.

== Plays ==
- Mulk-ja-Mudabar
- Bukh-jo-Shikar
- Gulab Jo Gul urf Devi Jo Partap
- Motiye Ji Mukhri urf Anand Ji Sundari
- Mat-Heen Nari
- Zamindari Zulum

== Filmography ==
Year	Title	Director	Writer	Producer	Ref(s)
1933	Insan Ya Shetan	No	Yes	Yes	
1934	Yasmin	No	Yes	Yes	
1934	Bharat Ki Beti	No	Yes	Yes	
1936	Sangdil Samaj	No	Yes	Yes	
1938	Zamana	No	No	Yes	
1940	Hindustan Hamara	No	Yes	Yes	
1940	Shap Mukti	No	No	Yes	
1941	Pyaas	No	Yes	Yes	
1945	Preet	No	Yes	Yes	
1946	Salgirah	Yes	Yes	Yes	
1947	Doosri Shaadi	No	Yes	Yes	
1947	Shravan Kumar	No	Yes	Yes	
1948	Ghar Ki Izzat	No	Yes	No	
1949	Maa Ka Pyar	No	Yes	Yes	
1950	Bhai Bahen	No	Yes	Yes	
1951	Tarana	No	Yes	Yes	

== Bibliography ==
- Shravan Kumar: A Hindu Mythological Story of a Youth Devotion to Parents. Bombay, India: Mahinder. 1945.
