= Snehprabha Pradhan =

Indian actress

- Pradhan in a publicity still for Pyaas (1941)
- Born: 28 October 1915
- Died: 7 December 1993 (aged 78)
- Occupation: Actress
- Spouse: Kishore Sahu (m. 1940; div. 1941)

Snehprabha Pradhan (28 October 1915 – 7 December 1993) was an Indian actress who worked in Hindi and Marathi cinema, and later expanded to Marathi theatre. She made her film debut with Civil Marriage (1940) and gained recognition with Punar Milan (1940). Her notable films included Pyaas (1941), Khilona (1942), Naya Tarana (1943), Salgirah, Dharti Ke Lal (both 1946) and Birha Ki Raat (1950).

Pradhan later focused on Marathi theatre and published her autobiography, Snehankita, in the 1970s. She died on 7 December 1993, aged 78.

== Life and career ==
Pradhan was born on 28 October 1915, in Nagpur. Her parents, Tarabai and Vithalrao Pradhan, were of Marathi descent. According to Khwaja Ahmad Abbas, she was one of "one of the first college girls (the others were Durga Khote, Enakshi Rama Rao and Leela Chitnis) from an emancipated Maharashtrian household".

Pradhan began her career in the late 1930s by joining Bombay Talkies, where she was among the several young actors groomed by Devika Rani in a natural style of acting, alongside other newcomers such as Dilip Kumar and Raj Kapoor. Her film debut came in Ramchandra Thakur's Civil Marriage (1940), in which she acted opposite Arun and Harish. The same year, she gained recognition as a leading actress with Punar Milan (1940). She married co-star Kishore Sahu and divorced him a year later. In 1942, Pradhan appeared in the Marathi-language film Pahili Mangalagaur; it marked the screen debut of Lata Mangeshkar, in a small role as the younger sister of Pradhan's character.

Pradhan's other notable films included Pyaas (1941), Khilona (1942), Naya Tarana (1943), Salgirah (1946), and Birha Ki Raat (1950). She also appeared as a part of an ensemble cast in Khwaja Ahmad Abbas' Dharti Ke Lal (1946). Pradhan's later career shifted substantially toward Marathi theatre. She notably played Desdemona in a production of Othello, opposite Nanasaheb Phatak playing Othello.

Parallel to her acting career, Pradhan was also engaged in off-screen social work. After Indian independence, she was selected by Cinevoice, alongside Nargis and Veera, to report on an All India Congress Committee session in Bombay. In 1953, she participated in Constellation Night, a Hindi film industry charity show for scarcity-affected areas of Maharashtra, performing alongside actor Randhir Kapoor.

In her private life, Pradhan had a relationship with Dr. Shirodkar for about 14 years, until his death. Pradhan published an autobiography titled Snehankita in the 1970s. She died on 7 December 1993.

== Filmography ==
- Civil Marriage (1940)
- Sajani (1940)
- Punar Milan (1940)
- Saubhagya (1940)
- Pyaas (1941)
- Pardesi (1941)
- Pahili Mangalagaur (1942) – Marathi film
- Khilona (1942)
- Ladaai Ke Baad (1943)
- Naya Tarana (1943)
- Din Raat (1945)
- Preet (1945)
- Salgirah (1946)
- Shikayat (1948)
- Birha Ki Raat (1950)
