= Inkaar =

Inkaar may refer to:

- Inkaar (1943 film), starring Jagdish Sethi
- Inkaar (1977 film), produced by Raj Sippy and directed by Romu Sippy, starring Vinod Khanna and Vidya Sinha
- Inkaar (2013 film), produced by Prakash Jha and directed by Sudhir Mishra, starring Arjun Rampal and Chitrangada Singh
- Inkaar (2019 TV series), produced by Momina Duraid, starring Yumna Zaidi, Imran Ashraf and Sami Khan
