= Gope (actor) =

Indian actor

- Born: Gope Bishandas Kamlani; 11 April 1913; Hyderabad, Sindh, British India
- Died: 19 March 1957 (aged 43); Bombay, Bombay State, India
- Occupation: Actor
- Years active: 1933 – 1957
- Spouse: Latika (actress) (m. 1949)

Gope (11 April 1913 – 19 March 1957) was an Indian actor of Hindi cinema. Starting his career with a small role in Insaan Ya Shaitaan (1933), directed by Moti Gidwani and produced by Eastern Arts Production, Gope went on to act in over one hundred forty films in a career spanning twenty-four years from 1933 to 1957. Several of his films were released following his death.

Best known for his comedy roles, he is stated to be one of Hindi cinema's "most popular comedians". His acting in comic roles won him "critical and popular acclaim" and he soon became "the leading comedian of his time". His popularity assured him of being mentioned in the credit role of films along with the main cast. He became famous after lip-syncing the popular number "Mere Piya Gaye Rangoon" from Patanga, given playback by C. Ramchandra for Gope and by Shamshad Begum for Nigar Sultana.

He formed a popular comic pairing with Yakub, in the "Laurel-and-Hardy" style, and the producers used them in several films. Their most famous films together were Patanga (1949), followed by Bazar (1949), Beqasoor and Sagai (1951).

== Early years ==
Gope was born Gope Bishandas Kamlani, on 11 April 1913, in Hyderabad, Sindh, British India. He was one of nine children. With K. S. Daryani's help, Gope moved to Mumbai and started his acting career in a small role in Insaan Ya Shaitaan (1933), which starred Jaddanbai, Ermeline and the then reigning comedian, Dixit.

== Career ==
Gope acted in other memorable roles in films such as Hindustan Hamara, Mirza Sahiban, Patanga and Chori Chori. Gope also tried playing negative roles. In the 1951 Dilip Kumar-Madhubala starrer film Taraana, he teamed up with Jeevan to play the villain's role in comic style. He started Gope Productions in the 1950s, which made films such as Hangama and Biradari. Some of these films were directed by Gope's brother, Ram Kamlani. Gope married actress Latika and continued to act in films until his premature death in 1957 on the set of Kundan Kumar's Teesri Gali, which was eventually released in 1958.

== Personal life ==
Gope married actress Latika on 5 February 1949 under the Civil Marriages Act. Latika had earlier acted in the film Gopinath (1948) opposite Raj Kapoor. According to a Filmindia magazine report, "a grand reception was given to the newly wedded couple at the Shree Sound Studios in which many film people participated. There was also a moonlight party later on the Juhu sands." Gope born a Hindu became a Jehovah's Witness. He had two sons with Latika. After his death, his widow Latika relocated to the United Kingdom with their two young sons.

== Filmography ==
Gope acted in over one hundred forty films in a career spanning twenty-four years from 1933 to 1957. A partial list:

Year	Film	Cast	Director	Studio/Producer
1933	Insan Ya Shaitan	Jaddanbai, Dixit	Moti Gidwani	Eastern Arts Production
1934	Prem Pariksha	Jaddanbai, Hari Shivdasani, Rajkumari	G. R. Sethi	Eastern Arts Production
1935	Dharam Ki Devi (Religious Lady, Suhag Ki Raat)	Sardar Akhtar, Kumar, Hari Shivdasani, Anant Marathe	Hiren Bose	Eastern Arts Production
1935	Bharat Ki Beti (India's Daughter)	Rattan Bai, Gul Hamid, Yasmin, Amirbai Karnataki	Premankur Atorthy	Eastern Arts Production
1936	Pratima (The Idol Of Love, Prem Murti)	Sardar Akhtar, Nazir, Omkar Devaskar	Ram Daryani	Daryani Productions
1937	Gentleman Daku (Gentleman Bandit)	Leela Chitnis, Yusuf Effendi, Kokila	Ram Daryani	Daryani Productions
1938	Rajkumari (The Princess)	Lalita Pawar, Nazir, Ameena, O. K. Dar	Dwarka Khosla	Krishna Movies
1939	Kaun Kisi Ka (Who Belongs To Whom?)	Shobhana Samarth, Nazir, Padma Devi, Khurshid, Mubarak, K. N. Singh	C. M. Luhar (Chimanlal Muljibhoy Luhar)	Hindustan Cinetone
1940	Laxmi (Lakshmi)	Bibbo, Kumar, Jeevan, Maya Devi	Mohan Sinha	Circo Productions
1940	Hindustan Hamara (Our India)	Jamuna Barua, Nandrekar, Padma Devi, Hari Shivdasani	Ram Daryani	Film Corporation of India
1941	Laheri Jeevan (Life Is A Comedy)	Husn Banu, Harishchandra Rao, W. M. Khan	S. M. Yusuf	Harishchandra Pictures
1941	Pyaas (Thirst)	Ishwarlal, Sneh Prabha		
1942	Society	Sitara Devi, Rajkumari Shukal, Nazir, Majid	S. Nazir	Hind Pics
1942	Umar Marvi (Meri Duniya)	Mazhar Khan, Kaushalya, Ashiq Hussain, Hari Shivdasani	Mazhar Khan	National Artists
1942	Duniya Ek Tamasha (The World's A Show)	Sardar Akhtar, W. M. Khan, Shyam, Urmila	Dwarka Khosla	Saubhagya Pictures
1943	Jhankar	Chandra Mohan, Pramila, Kumar, Azurie	S. Khalil	Silver Films
1943	Muskurahat (The Smile)	Motilal, Vanmala, Hari Shivdasani, Leela Mishra	Dwarka Khosla	Saubhagya Pictures
1943	Nai Zindagi (Gharonda)	Sheikh Mukhtar, Anees Khatoon, Yakub	S. Khalil	United Films
1943	School Master	Karan Dewan, Kaushalya, Maya Bannerji, Rajkumari Shukal	C. M. Luhar	Sun Art Pictures
1944	Aaina (Mirror)	Trilok Kapoor, Husn Banu, Yakub		
1944	Krishna Bhakta Bodana (Krishna Worshipper Bodana)	Sheikh Mukhtar, Meera, Ranjit Kumari, Rani Premlata	J. B. H. Wadia	Wadia Movietone
1945	Khiladi	E. Billimoria, Agha, Rajkumari	A. H. Essa	Empire Pictures
1945	Bisvi Sadi	Motilal, Nargis, Mazhar Khan	M. D. Bhavnani (Mohanlal Dayaram Bhavnani)	Bhavnani Productions
1946	Chalis Karod (Forty Crores)	Nirmala Devi, Yakub, Arun, Agha	Nanabhai Bhatt	Chandra Art
1946	Laat Saheb (Big Lord)	Latika, Harishchandra Rao, Anees Ktoon, Dalpat	K. P. Bhave	Harishchandra Pictures
1947	Mirza Sahiban	Noorjahan, Trilok Kapoor		
1947	Dak Bangla (Rest House)	Suraiya, Wasti, Kamal Kapoor	M. Sadiq	Indian National Pictures
1948	Ghar Ki Izzat (Honour Of The House)	Dilip Kumar, Mumtaz Shanti, Manorama, Jeevan	Ram Daryani	Murli Movietone
1948	Pugree	Kamini Kaushal, Wasti, Gope, Dixit, Ram Avatar, Jeevan	Anant Thakur	All India Pictures
1948	Pyar Ki Jeet (Love's Victory)	Suraiya, Rehman, Raj Mehra, Manorama, Leela Mishra	O. P. Dutta	Famous Pictures
1949	Patanga (The Moth)	Nigar Sultana, Khairati, Shyam, Yakub, Purnima, Randhir	H. S. Rawail	Varma Films
1949	Bazaar	Shyam, Nigar Sultana, Yakub, Cuckoo	K. Amarnath	K. Amarnath
1950	Bhai Bahen	Geeta Bali, Nirupa Roy, Prem Adib, Bharat Bhushan	Ram Daryani	Krishna Movies
1950	Beqasoor	Madhubala, Ajit, Yakub	K. Amarnath	Madhukar Pictures
1950	Hanste Aansoo	Madhubala, Motilal, Manorama		
1950	Anmol Ratan (Rare Jewel)	Karan Dewan, Meena Shorey, Nirmala, Madan Puri	M. Sadiq	Jaimini Dewan for Dewan Productions
1951	Tarana (Tune)	Dilip Kumar, Madhubala, Shyama, Jeevan	Ram Daryani	K. S. Daryani
1951	Sazaa	Dev Anand, Shyama, Nimmi, Durga Khote	Fali Mistry	G. P. Productions
1951	Nagina (The Jewel)	Nutan, Nasir Khan, Bipin Gupta	Ravindra Dave	Pancholi Productions
1951	Sagai (The Engagement)	Rehana, Premnath, Yakub	H. S. Rawail	Varma Films
1951	Sanam (Beloved)	Suraiya, Dev Anand, Meena Kumari, K. N. Singh	Nandlal Jaswantlal	United Technicians
1956	Chori Chori (The Theft)	Raj Kapoor Nargis	Anant Thakur L.B. Lachman	
1958	Teesri Gali, Gope died on the movie set	Pram Adib Abhi Bhattacharya Shyama Mohan Choti	Kundan Kumar	Radiant Movies
