= Bhai Bahen =

- Directed by: Ram Daryani
- Written by: K. S. Daryani
- Produced by: Krishna Movies
- Starring: Geeta Bali; Nirupa Roy; Prem Adib; Bharat Bhushan; Gope
- Music by: Shyam Sunder
- Release date: 1950
- Country: India
- Language: Hindi

Bhai Bahen is a 1950 Bollywood musical film directed by Ram Daryani. The film was made under the banner of Krishna movies and had music direction by Shyam Sunder. The film starred Geeta Bali, Nirupa Roy, Prem Adib, Bharat Bhushan, Gope, Jeevan and Cuckoo.

== Cast ==
- Geeta Bali
- Bharat Bhushan
- Nirupa Roy
- Prem Adib
- Gope
- Jeevan
- Cuckoo
- K. N. Singh
- Yashodhra Katju
