= Panghat =

- Directed by: Mahesh Chandra, K.J. Parmar
- Starring: Ratnamala; Jeevan; Sushil Kumar; Lalita Pawar
- Music by: S. N. Tripathi
- Release date: 1943
- Country: India
- Language: Hindi

Panghat is a Bollywood film. It was released in 1943.

== Synopsis ==
Durgaprasad Chaturvedi, a zamindar (landlord), has built a community well for the local people's use. After his passing, his son Jamunaprasad administers the well, restricting its use. Jamunaprasad wishes to marry his daughter Radha to Mohan, son of a businessman. But as it turns out, Mohan is not who he claims to be.
