= Pyaas =

Pyaas may refer to:

- Pyaas (1941 film)
- Pyaas (1982 film)
