= Bhookh =

Bhookh (lit. 'Hunger' in Hindi) may refer to these Indian films:

- Bhookh (1947 film), a Bollywood film
- Bhookh (1978 film), a Bollywood action film

== See also ==
- Bhukha (lit. 'Hungry'), a 1989 film by Sabyasachi Mohapatra
