= Salgirah =

- Directed by: K. S. Daryani
- Starring: P. Jairaj, Snehprabha Pradhan, Kumar, Gope, Pramila, Bibbo
- Music by: Bulo C Rani
- Release date: 1946
- Country: India
- Language: Hindi

Salgirah is a Bollywood film. It was released in 1946.
