= Aahuti =

Aahuti refers to a sacrifice or offering in Hinduism, cf. Svaha.

Aahuti may also refer to:

- Aahuti (1950 film), a Hindi film
- Aahuti (1978 film), a Hindi film
- Aahuti (1985 film), a Hindi film
- Aahuthi (1988 film), a 1988 Telugu film

== See also ==
- Swaham, a 1994 Indian film
- Ahuti Prasad, an Indian film actor
