= Nauker =

Nauker or Naukar may refer to:

- Naukar (1943 film), an Indian Hindi-language drama film directed by Shaukat Hussain Rizvi and written by Saadat Hassan Manto, starring Chandra Mohan
- Nauker (1979 film), an Indian Hindi-language comedy drama film by Ismail Memon and Jyoti Swaroop, starring Sanjeev Kumar and Jaya Bachchan
- Naukar, a 1975 Pakistani film directed by Naheed Akhtar, with music composed by M. Ashraf

== See also ==
- Naukri.com, an Indian employment website
- Naukri (1954 film), Indian Hindi-language film by Bimal Roy
- Naukri, a 1978 Indian film
