= Khazanchi Ki Beti =

- Starring: Sharda
- Release date: 1943
- Country: India
- Language: Hindi

Khazanchi Ki Beti is a Bollywood film. It was released in 1943.
