= Vijay Lakshmi =

- Release date: 1943
- Country: India
- Language: Hindi

Vijay Lakshmi is a Bollywood film. It was released in 1943.
