= Pujari (film) =

1946 Indian film

- Directed by: Aspi Irani
- Produced by: Ardeshir Irani
- Starring: Mumtaz Shanti; Masood; Bipin Gupta; Baby Mumtaz
- Music by: Hansraj Behl
- Release date: 1946
- Country: India
- Language: Hindi

Pujari is a 1946 Indian Hindi-language film directed by Aspi Irani and produced by Ardeshir Irani in his final production venture. The film stars Mumtaz Shanti, Masood and Bipin Gupta, and features Madhubala as a child actor credited as "Baby Mumtaz". The film's music was composed by Hansraj Behl in one of his early breakthrough works in Hindi cinema.

== Cast ==
- Mumtaz Shanti
- Masood
- Bipin Gupta
- Baby Mumtaz

== Production ==
The film was the final production by Ardeshir Irani.

It was one of the earliest films featuring Madhubala, who appeared as a child actor under her contract with Ranjit Studios.

== Music ==
The music for Pujari included ten songs composed by Hansraj Behl. The film marked Behl's breakthrough in the Hindi cinema.

The soundtrack included the devotional song "Bhagwan Mere Gyaan Ke Deepak Ko Jala De," sung by a young Madhubala. Additionally, there were two songs rendered by the classical vocalist Firoz Dastur of the Kirana gharana.

== Reception ==
The film received a scathing review from Baburao Patel of filmindia, who panned it as a "rotten show" with a dull screenplay and poor direction. While he praised Bipin Gupta's performance and Mumtaz Shanti's dancing, Patel ultimately dismissed the venture as a boring experience and a risky proposition for film exhibitors.
