= Kanhaiyalal (actor) =

Indian film actor (1910–1982)

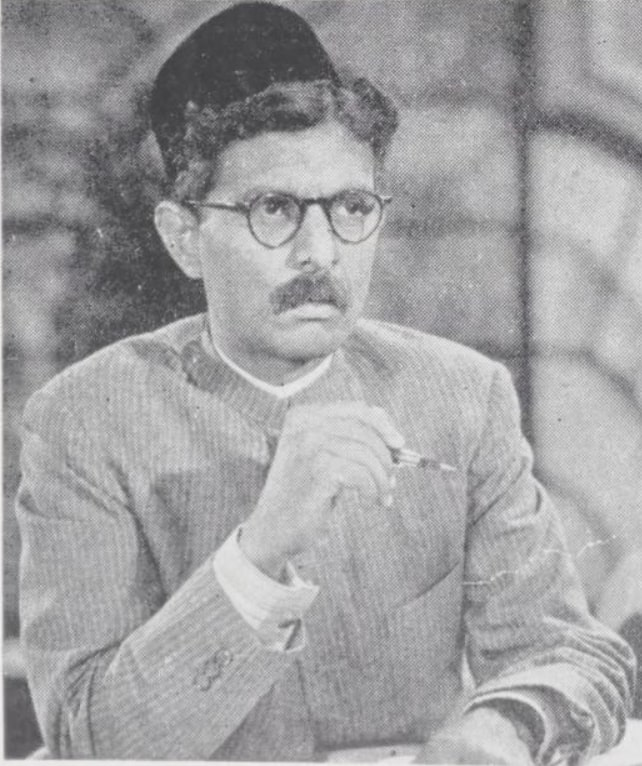
- Kanhaiyalal in the film Khilona,1942
- Born: Kanhaiyalal Chaturvedi; 1910; Benares (Varanasi), Uttar Pradesh, British ,India
- Died: 14 August 1982 (aged 71–72); Delhi
- Other name: Lala -Munim -Sukhilala
- Occupations: Actor, Production Manager
- Years active: 1938–1982
- Known for: Mother India; Aurat; Hum Paanch
- Relatives: Sankatha Prasad Chaturvedi (brother)

Kanhaiyalal (1910 – 14 August 1982) was an Indian actor who acted in 122 films in his career, primarily in Hindi films produced in Bollywood, the Mumbai-based film industry.

== Early life ==
Kanhaiyalal was born in 1910 in Varanasi. His father Pandit Bhairodutt Choube, popularly known as Choubeji, was the proprietor of the Sanatan Dharm Natak Samaj in Varanasi. With his father not in agreement with him taking up any form of stage work, he eventually wore out his father's opposition and did odd jobs in the troupe. At 16, he started writing and then moved on to small roles. When his father died, the brothers tried to run the drama company for some time. Proving to be unsuccessful, they downed shutters and Kanhaiyalal decided to seek a film career in Bombay. His elder brother Sankatha Prasad Chaturvedi had already set a precedent. He established himself as an actor in silent films, but Kanhaiyalal came to films without the intention of acting, wanting to write and direct instead. Eventually capitulating, he began by working as an extra in Sagar Movietone's Sagar Ka Sher. He would have remained a background extra but for a fated twist.

== Career ==
He was fond of plays and came to Mumbai to find a space on stage. He staged his own written play Pandrah August in Mumbai, and later he tried his luck in films. He also wrote many plays. In the 1939 film Ek Hi Raasta as Banke, he got a break in Hindi films and in 1940, he got the role of the moneylender (Sahukar) in Mehboob Khan's film Aurat as Sukkhi Lala. After that, he later acted in many films as a character artist. When Mehboob Khan directed his film Mother India which was a remake of his earlier film 'Aurat', he again picked Kanhaiyalal to act as Sukkhi Lala, a character that came alive with his natural acting. Some of the performances of Kanhaiyalal which were appreciated by the audience for his versatility include his characters in the films Bhookh (1947), Ganga Jamuna, Upkar, Apna Desh, Janta Hawaldar, Dushman, Bandhan, Bharosa, Dharti Kahe Pukar Ke, Hum Paanch, Gaon Hamara Sehar Tumhara, Dadi Maa, Gruhasti, Hatyara, Palkon Ki Chhaon Mein, Heera, Teen Bahuraniyan, Dost etc. His memorable roles include those as villainous scheming moneylenders in the films Mother India, Ganga Jamuna, and Upkaar.

As he recalled in an interview, "An actor playing Motilal's father had not reported on the sets, so there was an opportunity to step into the breach. The dialogue I had to speak ran to a full sheet of foolscap paper. Almost everyone on the sets was ready to laugh at me trying to be an actor, but God helped me and I did my job." The film was Jhul Badn, written by K. M. Munshi (the founder of Bharatiya Vidya Bhavan), directed by Sarvottam Badami and starring Motilal and Sabita Devi. To his delight, his talkie debut fetched him a ten-rupee increment as his salary rose to Rs 45 a month. "Another promotion I earned was to play grandfather instead of father. This was in Sadhana (Old), also by Sagar Movietone. My grandson Prem Adib was the hero of the film. That was my first big role after which I became 'acceptable'. I was quite young but I thus started playing old roles. And, down the years, I got older and older but my roles didn't grow younger and younger!"

For Sadhana, he also wrote the dialogues and lyrics. In fact, it was while he was reading out the dialogues he had written that Chimanlal Desai, proprietor of Sagar, made him an offer to enact the role. "I must also put it on record that when the film was being made, quite a number of people thought I was bogus and withheld cooperation. However, the film was a big hit and achieved a silver jubilee at Imperial Cinema."

Getting frustrated at not getting the chance to direct a film, however, after Sadhana, Kanhaiyalal went home to Varanasi. When he returned to Bombay, it was with the understanding that he would help Virendra Desai (son of Sagar Movietone boss, Chimanlal Desai). He rewrote the dialogue of Sanskar and also its lyrics, but it came to naught.

However, the rise of his career graph was launched by Mehboob Khan with writer Wajahat Mirza playing the catalyst. In his instance, Kanhaiyalal was selected for the role of Sukkhi Lala in Aurat (1940). He played the wicked moneylender who had evil designs on the young widow. As he reminisced in an interview, "On this production, too, I had the feeling that the ice had yet to be broken. There was no make-up man free or willing to attend to me. When I explained this difficulty to Faredoon Irani, the cinematographer, he calmly said, 'Don't worry. Just appear as you are and I will photograph you without makeup.' He did just that. My make-up consisted only of a mustache. There are not very many cinematographers who will stake their reputation by agreeing to photograph artists without make-up. I admired Mr. Irani's courage and self-confidence. I regard my Aurat role as a really good one. I was helped tremendously by the lines Wajahat Mirza wrote for me. In fact, I firmly believe that what an actor needs most of all is good dialogue to enable him to do well."

While shooting the scene in which the house collapses on the salacious Sukhilala, Kanhaiyalal was hurt. In honor of the dictum, the show must go on, he right away told Mehboob Khan not to call a doctor immediately, but to finish the remaining shots. When he came out of the set eventually, the doctor was waiting for him. Aurat had a golden jubilee run with Sardar Akhtar (Mrs. Mehboob Khan) playing the lead. When Mehboob remade Aurat as Mother India (1957), only Kanhaiyalal reprised his role, a first in Hindi cinema with the same actor replaying the same character 17 years later.

Telescoped into the stereotype that bears his signature, early in his career he experimented much more than in his later years. "In Mehboob's film Bahen (1941), I had the role of a good-natured pickpocket. Here, four scenes originally conceived for me were spun out into about fourteen by Wajahat Mirza. In National Studios' Radhika (1941), directed by K. B. Lall, I played a temple priest and in Lal Haveli (1944, again by Lall), I played the comic role of a Pandit. Yakub starred in the film and his frequent punch line telling me Chacha, pasina aa raha hai became quite famous."

In Gunga Jumna (1961), he again excelled as a munim. He also shone in Mahesh Kaul's Sautela Bhai (1962), but the film tanked. Gemini's Grahasti (1962), in which he played a station master gave him immense satisfaction and he said: "In my opinion, it's the first picture from the South starring me to achieve that much versatility."

The trouble monger continued his winning streak with Upkar, Ram aur Shyam (both 1967), Teen Bahuraniyan, Dharti Kahe Pukare (1969), Gopi, Jeevan Mrityu (1970), Dushman (1972) Apna Desh (1972), Heera, Dost, Palkon Ki Chaon Mein, Karmayogi (1978), Janata Hawaldar (1979) and Hum Paanch (1980).

After completing a century of roles in Bollywood, Hathkadi (1982) became his swan song as his histrionics breathed their last on 14 Aug 1982 while he was 72.

== Family ==
His brother Sankatha Prasad Chaturvedi was also an actor. His daughter Hemaa Singh is a film producer.

== Legacy ==
A documentary based on his life Naam Tha Kanhaiyalal was released on MX Player on 29 November 2022. Business Line called his dialogue, Kar bhala, so ho bhala (A good deed always comes around) as one of the most iconic dialogue by a villain in Hindi Cinema.

== Filmography ==
- Bhole Bhale (1936) - Tara's father
- Gramophone Singer (1938)
- Ek Hi Raasta (1939) - Banke
- Aurat (1940) - Sukhilala
- Radhika (1941) - Mohan
- Bahen (1941) - Moti
- Aasra (1941) - Ticket examiner
- Khilona (1942) - Seth
- Nirdosh (1942) - Shadilal
- Dulhan (1943)
- Dost (1944)
- Lal Haveli (1944) - Pandit Kanhaiyalal Chaturvedi
- Pagli Duniya (1944)
- Gaali (1944)
- Kiran (1944)
- Ramayani (1945)
- Aarti (1945)
- Shri Krishn Arjun Yuddha (1945)
- Panihari (1946)
- Bhookh (1946)
- Rasili (1946)
- Toote Tare (1948) - Diwan Madanlal
- Jeet (1948) - Thakur Kalyan Singh
- Sipahiya (1949)
- Afsar (1950) - Village Tehsildar
- Nishana (1950)
- Hum Log (1950) - Lalaji / Haricharandas
- Buzdil (1951)
- Malhar (1951)
- Annadata (1952)
- Daag (1952) - Lala Jagat Narayan
- Mr. Sampat (1952) - Seth Makhanlal Jhaverimull Gheewala
- Doag (1952)
- Insaan (1952)
- Bahut Din Huwe (1954) -Pujari
- Naukari (1955) - Hari
- Devdas (1955) - Teacher
- Amanat (1955) - Laxmidas
- Naata (1955) - Lakhibaba
- Lalten (1956)
- Mother India (1957) - Sukhilala
- Bandi (1957)
- Chhote Babu (1957)
- Do Roti (1957) - Lakshmidas
- Sahara (1958) - Chaudhary Gaman Singh
- Panchayat (1958) - Charandas
- C.I.D. Girl (1959) - Nawab
- Swarg Se Sundar Desh Hamara (1959)
- Parakh (1960) - Pandit Tarkalankarji
- Ghunghat (1960) - Saroj's Father
- Gunga Jumna (1961) - Kallu
- Gharana (1960) - Advocate Shyam Lal Gupta
- Suhag Sindoor (1961) - Dayashankar
- Sautela Bhai (1962) - Gokul's father-in-law
- Son of India (1962) - Paro's dad
- Bharosa (1963) - Raunak Lal
- Meri Surat Teri Ankhen (1963) - Rahmat
- Grahasti (1963) - Station Master Ram Swarup
- Phoolon Ki Sej (1964) - Banwari
- Zindagi (1964) - Pandit
- Himalay Ki Godmein (1965) - Ghoghar Baba
- Oonche Log (1965) - Gunichand
- Rishte Naahte (1965) - Roopa's Father
- Noor Mahal (1965)
- Gaban (1966) - Devideen Khati
- Daadi Maa (1966) - Totaram
- Saaz Aur Awaaz (1966)
- Biradari (1966) - Rammurthy 'Dudhwala'
- Ram Rajya (1967)
- Ram Aur Shyam (1967) - Munimji
- Aurat (1967) - Pandit
- Diwana (1967) - Kaka
- Upkar (1967) - Lala Dhaniram
- Dulhan Ek Raat Ki (1967)
- Teen Bahuraniyan (1968) - Sita's and Mala's Father
- Bandhan (1969) - Malikram
- Chirag (1969) - Singh's employee
- Doli (1969)
- Meri Bhabhi (1969)
- Dharti Kahe Pukarke (1969) - GangaRam
- Rahgir (1969)
- Holi Ayee Re (1970) - Anokhelal
- Jeevan Mrityu (1970) - Jagat Narayan
- Samaj Ko Badal Dalo (1970) - Kundanlal
- Sharafat (1970) - Pratapchand
- Lakhon Me Ek (1971) - Manoharlal- Gauri's dad
- Dushman (1971) - Durga Prasad
- Banphool (1971) - Muninji
- Annadata (1972) - Landlord
- Apna Desh (1972) - Sevaram
- Tangewala (1972) - Munimji / Panditji
- Aan Baan (1972) - Dhaniram
- Gaon Hamara Shaher Tumhara (1972) - Advocate Chandershekhar Pandey
- Heera (1973) - Lala Dhaniram
- Anokhi Ada (1973) - Ram Prasad
- Dost (1974) - Gadibabu
- Anokha (1975) - Lala Kanhaiyalal
- Mazaaq (1975) - Murali's Father
- Zindagi Aur Toofan (1975) - Pathak Chacha
- Mounto (1975) - Lala
- Raakhi Aur Rifle (1976)
- Bhoola Bhatka (1976) - Ghanshamdas
- Jadu Tona (1976) - Amirchand's Father
- Hatyara (1977) - Pyarelal 'Pyare'
- Palkon Ki Chhaon Mein (1977)
- Duniyadari (1977) - Mevalal Sahukar
- Dil Aur Patthar (1977) - Train passenger
- Rahu Ketu (1978) - Ramprasad
- Satyam Shivam Sundaram (1978) - Pandit Shyam Sunder
- Daku Aur Jawan (1978) - Sukkhilala
- Karmayogi (1978) - Landlord
- Jaan-e-Bahaar (1979)
- Janta Hawaldar (1979) - Mama
- Sitara (1980) - Girdhari
- Hum Paanch (1980) - Lala Nainsukh Prasad Srivastav
- Teen Ekkey (1980) - Bhupat - Maharaja of sonapur
- Yeh Kaisa Nashaa Hai (1981)
- Kanhaiyaa (1981) - Makhanlal
- Haathkadi (1982) - Raghuvir
- Jeeo Aur Jeene Do (1982) - Villager
- Sajai Da Mang Hamaar (1983)
- Kasam Durga Ki (1984) - (final film role)
- Naam Tha Kanhaiyalal (2022) - Tribute to Kanhaiyalal Docu Film
