= Shahenshah Akbar =

- Music by: Ustad Jhande Khan
- Release date: 1943
- Country: India
- Language: Hindi

Shahenshah Akbar is a Bollywood film. It was released in 1943.

== Soundtrack ==
The music of the film was composed by Ustad Jhande Khan.
