= Tarana (1951 film) =

1951 Indian Hindi-language romantic comedy film

- Theatrical release poster
- Directed by: Ram Daryani
- Written by: D. N. Madhok
- Screenplay by: K. S. Daryani
- Story by: Dwarka Khosla
- Produced by: K. S. Daryani
- Starring: Madhubala; Dilip Kumar
- Cinematography: Kumar Jayant
- Edited by: M. D. Malekar
- Music by: Anil Biswas
- Production company: Krishin Movietone
- Distributed by: Krishin Movietone
- Release date: 5 October 1951
- Country: India
- Language: Hindi

Tarana (transl. Anthem) (Note: Also the titular character, played by Madhubala.) is a 1951 Indian Hindi-language romance film produced and written by K. S. Daryani and directed by Ram Daryani. Starring Madhubala and Dilip Kumar together for the first time, Tarana revolves around the titular character (Madhubala), a free-spirited village girl who falls in love with a visiting doctor (Kumar).

Tarana is best remembered as the production during which Madhubala and Dilip Kumar began a highly publicised affair that lasted for nearly nine years. Released on 5 October 1951, the film became one of the biggest box office hits of the year and earned positive reviews from critics, mostly for the lead pair's onscreen chemistry, music and direction.

== Plot ==
After a plane crash, Dr. Motilal (Dilip Kumar), is left stranded in a small village, where he is given shelter by a blind old man called Surdas and his playful, young daughter Tarana (Madhubala). During the course of their stay, Motilal falls for the charms of the innocent Tarana. Moti even helps Surdas regain his eyesight by means of an operation.

Meanwhile, Moti's father has promised him in marriage to Sheela, an affluent rich girl from the city without Moti's knowledge. A rich villager, Totaram wants to marry Tarana and is unhappy about Tarana's relationship with Motilal. When they go out for sightseeing, Totaram spreads false rumours about Tarana that she has defiled herself by going out with the 'pardesi' (foreigner) Motilal.

While out sightseeing, Moti falls ill and collapses to the ground, much to Tarana's horror! A heavy thunderstorm ensues as well! Tarana helps Moti, and they take refuge from the heavy rain in a small village barn. Totaram gathers the villagers, and they head to the barn along with Tarana's father Surdas. When Surdas opens the door, he finds Moti and Tarana inside, and presumes that Tarana has indeed defiled her character! Moti is beaten up by the villagers and chased away.

Totaram further maligns Tarana's reputation by claiming that she is pregnant, and bribes the village nurse Kaneshi to testify to this fact. He even requests Surdas to marry her off to him, and that he'd take the "blame". Surdas really believes that his daughter is characterless and that she has betrayed him. In rage, he burns the entire house with Tarana inside. A guilty Totaram admits that Tarana is innocent and that he spread ill rumours about her and Moti. A heartbroken Surdas realises his mistake and tries to rescue Tarana from the fire, but is killed. Moti comes back in search of his beloved Tarana, only to find her house burning down to ashes!

Thinking that she his dead, Moti returns to the city in despair. It is then that Sheela, the girl his father engaged him to, comes to his aid and helps him return to a normal life. He becomes a very successful doctor and tries to accept Sheela, but is unable to. However, his sweet memories with Tarana keep plaguing him day after day.

He still believes in his heart that Tarana is alive. He feels her presence somewhere around him. But he still agrees to his father's wish of marrying Sheela, though his heart is not at peace.

On the day of his wedding to Sheela, Moti runs away from the wedding and goes back to the old barn where he last saw Tarana. He is overjoyed to find her alive! Tarana thinks that he is already married and refuses to talk to him. But on learning the truth that he isn't married, she is elated!

Moti and Tarana are happily united, thus proving that true love always wins!!!

== Cast ==
Listed in the order of appearance in the opening credits:

- Madhubala as Tarana
- Dilip Kumar as Dr. Motilal "Moti"
- Shyama as Sheela
- Jeevan as Diwan Sahib
- Gulab
- Kumar
- Devaskar
- Girdhari
- Chandu
- Vikram Kapoor
- Gope as Totaram "Tote"

== Production ==
Tarana began filming in March 1951. The film is largely remembered as the film's lead actors, Madhubala and Dilip Kumar had become romantically involved during the making of the film. Reportedly Madhubala sent a pink rose to Kumar, which he accepted and later also wrote a letter to her. There began an affair that the two continued for 9 years before breaking up due to a fight between Dilip and her father on a scandalous court case.

== Soundtrack ==
Tarana

Soundtrack album by Anil Biswas
- Released: 1951
- Genre: Feature film soundtrack
- Length: 28:00
- Language: Hindi
- Label: Saregama
- Producer: Anil Biswas

Anil Biswas composed and wrote the soundtrack for the film. One of the most popular numbers was the duet "Seene Mein Sulagte Hai Armaan", sung by Talat Mahmood and Lata Mangeshkar. In 2017, Film Companion placed Tarana's album at #37 in "Bollywood's Top 100 Albums".

Songs
No.	Title	Lyrics	Singer(s)	Length
1.	"Nain Mile Nain"	Prem Dhawan & Talat Mahmood	Lata Mangeshkar & Talat Mahmood	3:14
2.	"Beiman Tore Nainwan Nindiya Na Aaye"	D. N. Madhok & Kaif Irfani	Lata Mangeshkar	2:56
3.	"Bol Papihe Bol"	Prem Dhawan	Lata Mangeshkar & Sandhya Mukherjee	2:50
4.	"Wapas Lele Yeh Jawani"	Kaif Irfani	Lata Mangeshkar	2:22
5.	"Yun Chhup Chhup Ke Mera Aana"	D. N. Madhok	Lata Mangeshkar	2:25
6.	"Woh Din Kahan Gaye Bata"	D. N. Madhok	Lata Mangeshkar	2:35
7.	"Seene Mein Sulagte Hai Armaan" (Raga Kalyan)	Prem Dhawan	Lata Mangeshkar & Talat Mahmood	3:07
8.	"Mose Rooth Gayo Mora Sanwariya"	D. N. Madhok	Lata Mangeshkar	2:44
9.	"Kya Khabar Thi"	D. N. Madhok	Lata Mangeshkar	2:34
10.	"Jali Jo Shakh Chaman"	D. N. Madhok & Kaif Irfani	Talat Mahmood	3:14
Total length:				28:00

== Reception ==
=== Critical reception ===
Tarana was well received by critics. Baburao Patel, the editor of Filmindia magazine, wrote in his review: "Ram Daryani has directed the picture very well and shows plenty of imagination in love sequences. Both [Dilip Kumar and Madhubala] have lived their roles and their romantic sequences seem to take a hues from the real canvas of life." Patel labelled Madhubala's performance as her finest, in October 1951.

In a commemorative article written by Filmfare, it was stated that Tarana was one of Madhubala's "best roles".

=== Box office ===
Tarana was a highly anticipated release, as Madhubala and Kumar were the most famous stars of contemporary cinema, and the reports of them being romantically involved further escalated its pre-release popularity. On its release, the film was immensely popular among audience, and eventually became the sixth most commercially successful film of the year. Tarana ended up celebrating a silver jubilee, and was thus classified a "hit" by contemporary trade analysts.
