= Return of Toofan Mail =

- Directed by: Aspi Irani
- Starring: Arun Kumar Ahuja; Shamim Bano; Jagdish Sethi; Hari Shivdasani
- Release date: 1942
- Country: India
- Language: Hindi

Return of Toofan Mail is a Bollywood film. It was released in 1942.
