= Ghar Ki Izzat (1948 film) =

- Poster
- Directed by: Ram Daryani
- Written by: K. S. Daryani
- Produced by: Ram Daryani
- Starring: Dilip Kumar; Mumtaz Shanti; Gope
- Cinematography: Kumar Jayawant
- Edited by: M.D. Malekar
- Music by: Pundit Gobindram
- Distributed by: Shree Sound Studios
- Release date: 21 January 1948
- Running time: 128 minutes
- Country: India
- Language: Hindi

Ghar Ki Izzat (lit. 'Honour of the House') is a 1948 Hindi drama film directed by Ram Daryani for Murli Movietone. The film starred Dilip Kumar and Mumtaz Shanti in lead roles with Manorama, Jeevan and Gope. The cinematography was by Kumar Jayawant. Music was composed by Pundit Gobindram. The story writer was K. S. Daryani and the dialogue and lyrics were by I. C. Kapoor.

The milieu is an upper middle-class joint family, with the mother treating her son's wife shabbily. The son, an educated man working as a lawyer, is unable to handle the situation at home and turns to drink.

== Plot ==
Chandra (Dilip Kumar) a young lawyer, lives in a rich joint family with his parents, sister Radhika (Manorama) and his sister's husband, Chaman (Gope). Chaman is made to do all the household chores as he lives on the sustenance provided by his wife's family. When Chaman is repeatedly insulted by his mother-in-law, Radhika steps in and walks out of the house with her husband. They start a small business outside the city and lead a happy life. One of their customers includes Roopa (Mumtaz Shanti), who lives a poor lifestyle with her loving older brother Moti (Jeevan) and a younger brother Gulab, studying in school. To make a living, Roopa runs a school

While visiting his sister, Chandra meets Roopa and is captivated by her loving, sincere personality. Chandra and Roopa fall in love and are married despite their financial differences. However, when Chandra's parents learn about Roopa's social status, they insult and taunt her, slowly making her life miserable. Chandra's mother tries to give Roopa's clothes away to the servants, calls her a robber and insults her brothers when they come to visit her. She even locks up Roopa in a room while Chandra is on a trip to Pune!

Chandra tries hard to change his parents' minds, but they don't pay attention to his words and continue oppressing Roopa. Despite Chandra's efforts, Roopa insists that she will listen to whatever her in-laws tell her, as she wants to win their hearts with love and respect. A distraught Chandra is sick of the disparity meted out to him and his wife, and leaves home. He takes to drinking and gambling, and his life falls apart. Radhika requests her mother to let Roopa out, as she is what Chandra truly needs. In the end, Chaman and Radhika help Chandra and Roopa be reunited again.

Chandra's parents realise their mistake and apologise to their son and daughter-in-law and promise to be loving. His mother tells Roopa that, henceforth, she would treat her like her own daughter. The movie ends on a happy note with everyone enjoying a dance presented by Roopa and Radhika.

The movie also addresses topics such as dowry, social injustice, poverty and relationships in a realistic and convincing manner.

== Cast ==
- Dilip Kumar as Chander
- Mumtaz Shanti as Roopa
- Manorama as Radhika
- Jeevan as Motilal
- Dixit as Raisaheb Chunnilal
- Suleman as Gulab
- Gulab as Mrs. Chunnilal
- Gope as Chimanlal

== Soundtrack ==
The music was directed by Pandit Gobindram, with lyrics by I. C. Kapoor (Ishwar Chandra Kapoor). The playback singers were Mohammed Rafi, Shamshad Begum, Meena Kapoor, G. M. Durrani, Ram Kamlani and Zohrabai Ambalewali.

=== Song list ===
#	Title	Singer
1	"Sari Duniya Ke Sartaj"	Shamshad Begum
2	"Fariyad Meri Sun Le"	Shamshad Begum
3	"Meri Duniya Ke Garibo Jago"	Shamshad Begum
4	"Dar Dar Ki Thokre Hai"	Shamshad Begum
5	"Bahut Betaqalluf Huye Ja Rahe Hain, jo Mehaman Banke"	Shamshad Begum, G. M. Durrani
6	"Taro Ki Toliyo Ye Kaisa Hai"	Shamshad Begum, G. M. Durrani
7	"Bagh Mein Koyaliya Yehi Gaye"	Shamshad Begum, Zohrabai Ambalewali
8	"Aankho Se Aankho Ko Do Chaar Kiye Jao"	Shamshad Begum, Ram Kamlani
9	"Wah Re Zamane Kya Rang Dikhaye"	Mohammed Rafi
10	"Boot Polish Karawa Le Baabu"	Meena Kapoor
11	"Bane Hain Hum To Ghar Janwai"	Ram Kamlani
