= Basant (film) =

1942 film

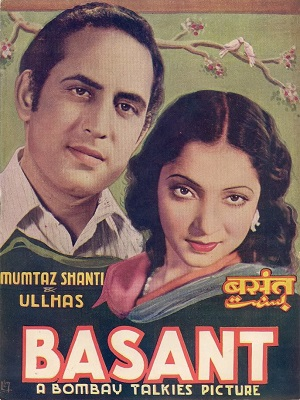
- Theatrical release poster
- Directed by: Amiya Chakrabarty
- Written by: Amiya Chakrabarty
- Produced by: Bombay Talkies
- Starring: Mumtaz Shanti; Ulhas; Kanu Roy; Madhubala (uncredited)
- Cinematography: R.D. Mathur
- Edited by: R.G. Gope
- Music by: Pannalal Ghosh
- Release date: 29 July 1942
- Running time: 146 minutes
- Country: India
- Language: Hindustani

Basant (transl. Spring) is a 1942 Indian romantic musical film directed by Amiya Chakrabarty, produced by Bombay Talkies and starring Mumtaz Shanti and Ulhas, along with Madhubala in an uncredited role.

Basant marked the Hindi film debut of Mumtaz Shanti, who was already a celebrated star in Punjabi film industry. However, the film is largely remembered as the first screen appearance of Madhubala, who played an uncredited role of Shanti's daughter; Madhubala later became a leading star in the 1950s and early 1960s.

The film was theatrically released on 29 July 1942 and was praised by critics for the performances of actors, music and direction. It was the highest-grossing Indian film at the time of its release and the highest-grossing Indian film of 1942. It had a 76-week run in the theatres. Atleast till 2006, Basant remained one of the fifty highest-grossing Indian films of all time when adjusted for inflation.

== Plot ==
Basant

Uma and her brother Babul are two downtrodden servants who dream of becoming singing-and-dancing stars on the stage. They attract the attention of the impresario Janaki Prasad, which leads to Uma marrying his spoilt and envious younger brother, Nirmal. A self-absorbed Nirmal sets out to make his own fortune and soon after their wedding, abandons Uma and their infant daughter, which is named Manju. When Nirmal returns to find his wife is working on the stage, he abducts Manju and disappears again. After a further 10 years of unhappy stage stardom of Uma, the family is reunited and the happy ending sees her return to being a housewife in accordance with her husband's wishes.

== Cast ==
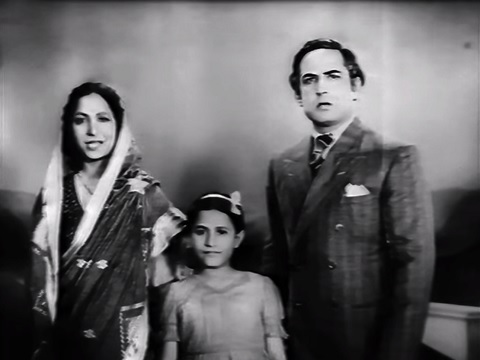
Mumtaz Shanti, Madhubala and Ulhas in Basant (from left to right)

- Mumtaz Shanti as Uma
- Ulhas as Nirmal
- Mumtaz Ali as Babul, Uma's brother
- P. F. Pithawala as Janaki Prasad, Nirmal's brother
- Suresh as Babul, Uma's brother (child role)
- Jagannath as Meena's Father
- Kamala
- Kanu Roy as House Rent Collector
- Pramila as Meena
- Madhubala as Manju (uncredited)

== Soundtrack ==
Barsaat Ki Raat

Soundtrack album by Pannalal Ghosh
- Released: 1942
- Genre: Feature film soundtrack
- Length: 32:00
- Language: Hindi
- Label: Saregama
- Producer: Pannalal Ghosh

The music of the film was composed by Pannalal Ghosh with lyrics penned by P. L. Santoshi.

Songs
No.	Title	Singer(s)	Length
1.	"Tum Ko Mubarak Ho"	Parul Ghosh & Suresh	3:20
2.	"Aaya Basant Sakhi"	Parul Ghosh & Aroon Kumar	3:11
3.	"Balam Dheere Bol"	Parul Ghosh & Aroon Kumar	3:12
4.	"Ek Duniya Basale Mere Man"	Parul Ghosh & Aroon Kumar	3:17
5.	"Gori Mose Ganga Ke Paar Milna"	Parul Ghosh & Aroon Kumar	3:16
6.	"Hua Kya Qusoor Jo Hamse Door"	Amirbai Karnataki	3:06
7.	"Kanta Lago Re Sajanwa Mose"	Parul Ghosh & Khan Mastana	3:02
8.	"Ummeed Unse Kya Thi"	Parul Ghosh	3:15
9.	"Mere Chhote Se Man Men"	Uma Devi	3:11
10.	"Ik Chhoti Si Duniya Re"	Parul Ghosh	2:09
Total length:			32:00

== Box office ==
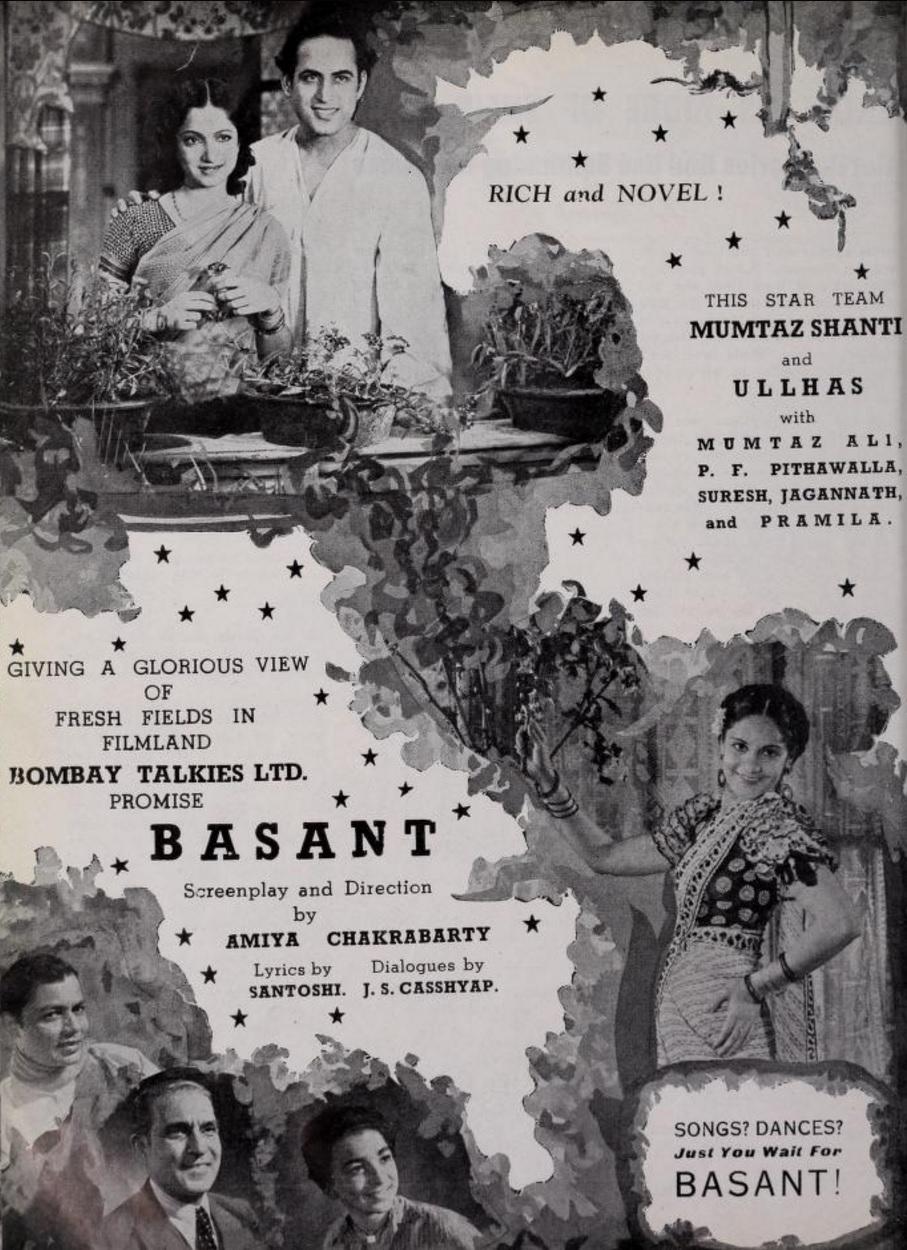
Publicity poster of Basant

At the end of its threatical run, Basant did a gross collection of ₹1.35 crore, with a nett of ₹80 lakhs. It became the highest-grossing Indian film of 1942, and also the highest-grossing Indian film at the time of its release. Basant's record was broken the next year by Kismet, which stars Ashok Kumar and Mumtaz Shanti in the lead roles.

== Madhubala ==
An eight-year-old Madhubala was spotted by Rai Bahadur Chunnilal when she was searching for work in film industry, along with her father Ataullah Khan. She was cast in Basant at a fee of ₹150. Though she was uncredited in the film but Mumtaz became the financial backbone of her family after the film's release. She found work in other films as a child artist where she was credited as Baby Mumtaz. In 1947, at the age of 14, she transitioned to adult roles with Neel Kamal.
