= Garam Masala (1972 film) =

- Theatrical release poster
- Directed by: Aspi Irani
- Written by: Hakim Riaz Latta (dialogues); Majrooh Sultanpuri (lyrics)
- Screenplay by: Hakim Riaz Latta
- Story by: Aspi Irani
- Produced by: C.Mohan
- Starring: Aruna Irani; Mehmood
- Cinematography: Dali Daruwala; Dara Engineer
- Edited by: Vitthal Bankar
- Music by: R. D. Burman
- Production company: Balaji Kala Mandir
- Release date: 5 May 1972
- Running time: 130 minutes
- Country: India
- Language: Hindi

Garam Masala is a 1972 Hindi-language comedy film, produced by C. Mohan under the Balaji Kala Mandir banner and directed by Aspi Irani. It stars Aruna Irani and Mehmood in lead roles, while Ashok Kumar, Amitabh Bachchan, Jeetendra and Hema Malini have given special appearances. The music of the film was composed by R. D. Burman.

== Plot ==
The film is a tale of a clash of ideologies-whether might is right or right is might. All was not well in the kingdom of Sabzbag. The king was missing for quite a few years and the prince was in the training center of Hercules growing up to be a worthy king. But Captain Kishore who was the despotic ruler had instructed Hercules to train the young king in everything but true kingship. On the Captain being satisfied that the young prince was developing into a cowardly fun loving clown, he sends a Royal escort to bring him from the training center of Hercules to be crowned. On the way by a trick Jugnu (a Gipsy girl) separates the young prince from his retinue and demands justice, on his becoming the king, but finds that the young prince was not capable of being either a strong or just ruler as he could not even find out what had happened to his own father. Jugnu lets him go and she is determined to fight herself for justice. The prince is received in the kingdom by the Captain and his beloved Neelima and seeing his antics, both of them are sure that he would be king in name only and they would themselves be the real power behind the throne. On the pretext of celebrating the prince's birthday, they try to collect more money from the already oppressed people. When the soldiers of the Captain are robbing the poor people, a masked person comes to their rescue, drives away the soldiers, and returns to the poor whatever was taken away from them. The Captain is furious and lays a plot to capture the masked man who has become a thorn in his side, and accordingly when the masked man Garam Masala comes into the palace to take all the money that was taken from the poor people, he is captured and is about to be unmasked when a second masked man comes and saves GARAM MASALA. The Captain finds himself face to face with these two mysterious masked men and when going into the dungeons finds an unknown prisoner in an iron mask. Who are these two masked men? Who is the man in the iron mask? What is the justice that Jugnu wants?

== Cast ==
- Aruna Irani as Jugnu "Garam Masala"
- Mehmood as Prince Suraj Kumar
- Jeevan as Captain Kishore Chandra
- Bindu as Neelima
- Tun Tun as Queen Khatoria
- Anwar Hussain as Hercules
- Yusuf Khan as Motu

== Uncredited Special Appearance ==
- Ashok Kumar as Maharaj
- Amitabh Bachchan as Robert Taylor
- Jeetendra as Jeetu
- Hema Malini as Jugnu's Elder Sister

== Soundtrack ==
No.	Title	Singer(s)	Length
1.	"Haay Re, Na Maaro"	Asha Bhosle
2.	"Raja Bana Mera Chhaila"	Asha Bhosle
3.	"Tum Jaise Ko To Payal Mein"	Asha Bhosle
4.	"Mujhko Bacha Le Meri Maa, Pardesi Aaya Mujhe Lene"	Asha Bhosle, Mohammed Rafi
5.	"Chunri Dharke Kinare Gori Nadiya Nahaay"	Asha Bhosle, Mohammed Rafi
