= Rekha (1943 film) =

- Release date: 1943
- Country: India
- Language: Hindi

Rekha is a Bollywood film. It was released in 1943.
