= Ram Daryani =

Indian director and film producer

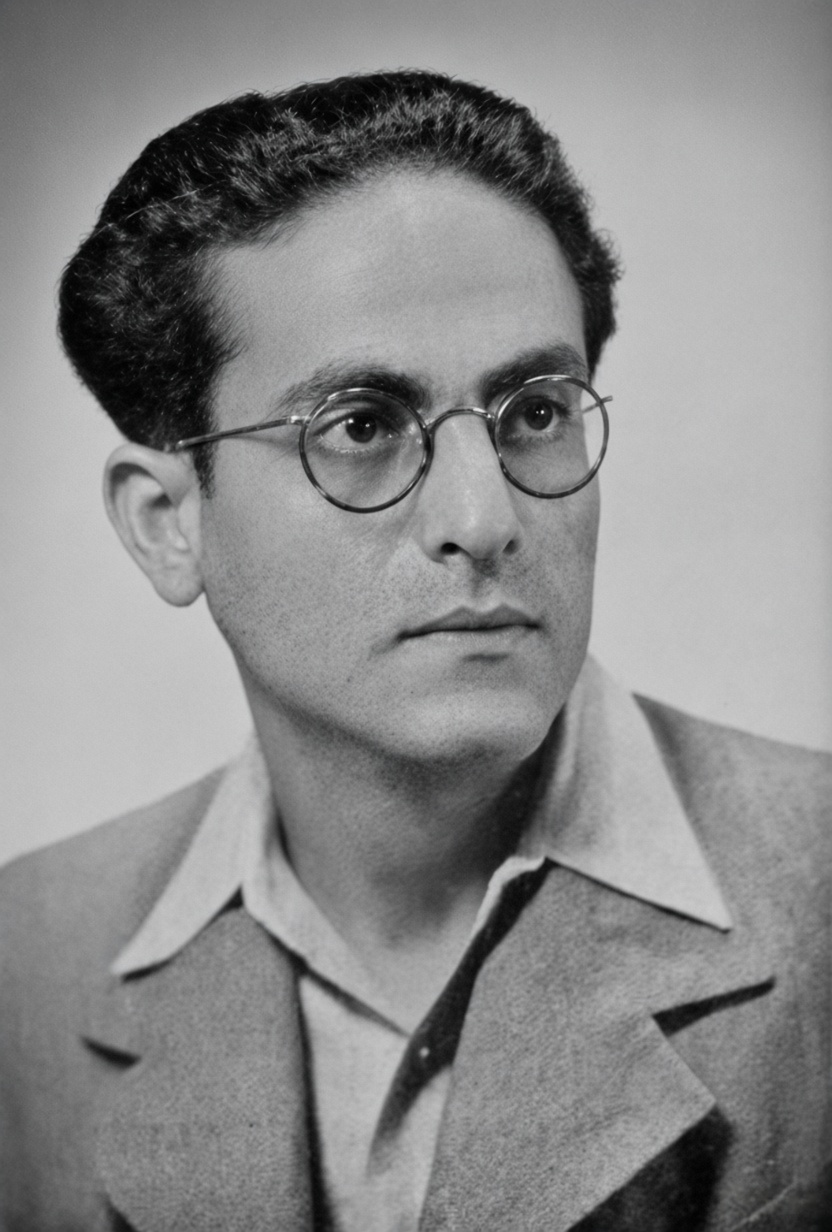
- Daryani in 1941
- Born: Ramchand Shamdas Daryani; 15 November 1915; Hyderabad, Sindh, British India
- Died: 7 September 1963 (aged 47); Bombay, Maharashtra, India
- Occupations: Director; film producer
- Years active: 1933–1960
- Organizations: Daryani Films (1936–1938); Krishin Movietone (1938–)
- Relatives: K. S. Daryani (brother)

Ramchand Shamdas Daryani (born 15 November 1915 – 7 September 1963) (Note: Date of birth attributed to film historian Sanjit Narwekar. However, according to journalist R. A. Shaikh's 1946 book Filmdom, Daryani was born on 6 December 1915.) was an Indian film director and producer. According to The Asian Film Directory and Who's Who, Daryani's "outstanding" films included Zamana (1938), Pyaas (1941), Doosri Shaadi (1947), and Tarana (1951). In a retrospective review of Tarana, Radio Times' Guide to Films notes that Daryani as a director was "renowned for the intelligence with which he tackled controversial issues" in his films.

== Early life ==
According to film historian Sanjit Narwekar, Daryani was born on 15 November 1915 in Hyderabad, Sindh (now in Pakistan). He was educated in Sindh and later in Karachi.

== Career ==
After completing his studies in 1933, Daryani joined Eastern Arts as an assistant director. His first film as a director was Khun-e-Nahaq (1935). He founded Daryani Films in 1936 and directed films including Prem Murti / Pratima (1936), Sangdil Samaj (1937), and Gentleman Daku (1938). Many of these were based on stories written by his brother, K. S. Daryani. In 1938, the Daryani brothers set up Krishin Movietone, under which Ram directed Zamana (1938), which was a commercial success. The Times of India commented that his "excellent direction" turned it into a "thought provoking film".

Daryani next directed Hindustan Hamara (1940), which was a socialist drama based on the exploitation of farmers in rural India. The Indian Express called it an "excellent propaganda for the kisan movement", but critic Baburao Patel was mixed in his review, writing that Daryani's direction was "weak" and lacked the efforts he put in earlier work. Patel however praised Daryani's work in Pyaas (1941), hailing it as the director's "best effort" so far which "manages to capture a wonderful harmony of all dramatic elements". Pyaas was a critical and commercial success. Later in the 1940s, Daryani directed the dramas Doosri Shaadi (1947) and Ghar Ki Izzat (1948); the latter received negative reviews from critics, with The Times of India calling it a "colourless" remake of Zamana.

Daryani produced and directed Bhai Bahen (1950), which was reported by The Bombay Chronicle to be doing "brisk business" at the box office. Daryani said that the film, centered on the social issue of dowry, was made with the purpose of both entertainment as well as social education. Daryani later directed the village romance Tarana (1951), starring Madhubala in the titular role. It was positively received: The Hindustan Times stated that the film was drawing "packed houses" in theatres, while Patel exclaimed, "After a long time, director Ram Daryani has given us an excellent entertainer. [He] has directed the picture very well and shows plenty of imagination in the love sequences."

In 1957, Daryani directed the historical film Mumtaz Mahal. Critic Ziya Us Salam retrospectively noted it as one of the cinematic adaptations of the romance between Shah Jahan and Mumtaz Mahal, but argued that the film's popularity has been eclipsed by Taj Mahal (1963), another film on the same subject. Daryani's final directorial venture was the melodrama Chand Mere Aaja, released in 1960.

== Death ==
Daryani died on 7 September 1963 at a premature age of 47.

== Filmography ==
Year	Title	Notes	Ref.
1933	Insan Ya Shaitan	As an assistant director	
1934–1935	Prem Praksha	As an assistant director	
1934–1935	Yasmin	As an assistant director	
1934–1935	Bharat-Ki-Beti	As an assistant director	
1935	Khun-e-Nahaq	Directorial debut; also known as Bal Hatya or Child Murder	
1936	Pratima	Also known as Prem Murti	
1936	Sangdil Samaj		
1937	Gentleman Daku		
1938	Zamana		
1940	Hindustan Hamara		
1941	Pyaas		
1942	Dukh Sukh		
1943	Qurbani		
1943	Chirag		
1945	Preet		
1945	Pannadai		
1946	Shravan Kumar		
1947	Doosri Shadi		
1948	Ghar Ki Izzat		
1949	Maa Ka Pyar		
1949	Bholi		
1950	Bhai Bahen		
1951	Tarana		
1953	Paheli Shaadi		
1954	Majboori	Also known as Chhoti Bahen	
1957	Mumtaz Mahal		
1960	Chand Mere Aaja		
