= Bhagta Bhoot =

- Directed by: Ramanlal Desai
- Starring: Baburao Pendharkar
- Release date: 1943
- Country: India
- Language: Hindi

Bhagta Bhoot is a Bollywood film. It was released in 1943.
