= Paheli Shaadi =

1953 Indian film

- Directed by: Ram Daryani
- Produced by: Krishin Movietone
- Starring: Nargis; Bharat Bhushan; Motilal
- Music by: Robin Chatterjee
- Release date: 1953
- Country: India
- Language: Hindi

Paheli Shaadi, also referred to as Pehli Shaadi, is a 1953 Indian Hindi-language film produced under the banner of Krishin Movietone and directed by Ram Daryani. The film's music was composed by Robin Chatterjee. According to The Illustrated Weekly of India, Paheli Shaadi was a "family melodrama" starring Nargis with Bharat Bhushan and Motilal, and revolved around her playing an "orphan-heiress", "an innocent young woman against whom her relatives conspire."

The May 1953 issue of Filmindia reported that the film did "good business" at the box office.

== Cast ==
- Nargis
- Bharat Bhushan
- Motilal
