= Punar Milan =

- Directed by: Najam Naqvi
- Written by: Sharadindu Bandyopadhyay
- Starring: Kishore Sahu; Snehprabha Pradhan
- Cinematography: R.D. Parineeja
- Music by: Ramchandra Pal
- Production company: Bombay Talkies
- Release date: 1940
- Country: India
- Language: Hindi
- Box office: ₹34 lakh

Punar Milan is a 1940 Bollywood film directed by Najam Naqvi and written by Saradindu Bandopadhyay. Kishore Sahu and Snehprabha Pradhan played the lead roles in the movie. It ended up becoming the sixth highest-grossing film of the year.

== Plot ==
Dr. Mohan belongs to an affluent, Brahmin family. On the day of his marriage to Shobhna, a question is raised about his caste. Upon repeated demands, Mohan admits that he does belong to a lower caste. Everyone is shocked, and the marriage is cancelled, leaving Mohan's family to wonder as to why he claims to be an untouchable person.

== Cast ==
- Kishore Sahu
- Snehprabha Pradhan
- Devika Rani
- Shah Nawaz
- P.F. Pithawala
- Mumtaz Ali
- Anjali Devi

== Soundtrack ==
Songs
No.	Title	Playback	Length
1.	"Aaya Re Pardesi Sajnawa"	Rajkumari Dubey, Ramchandra Pal	4:22
2.	"Deep Jalale Asha Ka"	Snehaprabha Pradhan	2:25
3.	"Hansle Jee Bhar Kar Hansle"	Snehaprabha Pradhan	2:31
4.	"Kar Le Kaam Bhaj Le Ram"	Ramchandra Pal	1:54
5.	"Mera Geet Bhara Sangeet Bhara Manwa"	Snehaprabha Pradhan	1:48
6.	"O Jeenewale Hanste Hanste Jeena"	Arun Kumar	2:19
7.	"Suni Sejariya Saiyyan Tu Ek Beri Aaja"	Rajkumar	3:25
8.	"Nacho Nacho Pyare Man Ke Mor"	Snehaprabha Pradhan, Arun Kumar	3:06
9.	"Aao Banaye Ghar Pyara"	Snehaprabha Pradhan, Arun Kumar	2:39
10.	"Sooni Sejariya Saiyan"	Rajkumari Dubey	3:04
