= Bhakta Raidas =

- Directed by: Keshavrao Dhaiber
- Starring: Lalita Pawar
- Release date: 1943
- Country: India
- Language: Hindi

Bhakta Raidas is a Bollywood film. It was released in 1943.
