= Badalti Duniya =

- Directed by: Mohan Sinha
- Starring: Mumtaz Shanti; Trilok Kapoor; K.C. Dey
- Release date: 1943
- Country: India
- Language: Hindi

Badalti Duniya is a Bollywood film. It was released in 1943.
