= Bhalai =

- Directed by: Nazir
- Starring: Mahajbin
- Release date: 1943
- Country: India
- Language: Hindi

Bhalai is a Bollywood film. It was released in 1943.
