= Badla (1943 film) =

- Directed by: Master Bhagwan
- Release date: 1943
- Country: India
- Language: Hindi

Badla is a Bollywood film directed by Master Bhagwan. It was released in 1943.

== Music ==
1. "Diwani Basegi Kya Teri Duniya" -
2. "Ghar Aaye Na More Saawaria" -
3. "Hanso Hanso Hasne Ke Din Aaye" -
4. "Kaisa Jawani Aayi" -
5. "Maashuk To Kya Milte" -
6. "Nazar Milate Hi Dil Me" -
7. "Pehle Hi Bekarar" -
8. "Sukh Ka Zamana Aaya" -
9. "Ye Ek Paise Me Takat Ki Puri Jholi Hai" -
