= Aabroo (1943 film) =

- Aabroo (1943)
- Directed by: Govind Ram
- Produced by: Hind Pictures
- Starring: Sitara Devi; Yakub; Masud; Nazir Ahmed
- Music by: Pandit Gobindram
- Release date: 1943
- Running time: 98 minutes
- Country: India
- Language: Hindi

Aabroo (Hindi: आबरू, transl. reputation) is a Bollywood film. It was released in 1943. The film was directed by Nazir and starred Sitara Devi, Yakub, Masud, Nazir Ahmed, Laddan and Chandabai. The music was composed by Pandit Gobindram.

Nazir had starred with Sitara Devi earlier in Baagbaan (1938) and when he re-launched his banner 'Hind Pictures' in 1943, he offered a partnership to Sitara Devi. She acted in all the five films produced by Hind Pictures that year. Four of them including Aabroo co-starred Nazir while one (Salma) had Ishwarlal opposite her.

== Cast ==
- Sitara as Shobha and Malti
- Yaqoob as Hari
- Jagdish as Dharam Dass
- Nazir as Jeevan
- Masood as Kunwar
- Shakir as Pujari
- Chanda Bai as Lachhi's mother
- Vatsala Kumthekar as Lachhi
- Janardan Sharma as Manager
- Laddan

== Soundtrack ==
The music director was Pandit Gobindram and the lyrics were written by several lyricists, namely: Tanveer Naqvi, Rajjan, Hasrat Lakhnavi, Swami Ramanand Saraswati. One version of the old popular song "Inhi Logon Ne Le Leena Dupatta Mera" is rendered in the film by Yakub. The lyrics are credited to Tanvir Naqvi, though there is a song recorded earlier than this. The song later gained popularity when used in Pakeezah 1972, sung by Lata Mangeshkar and with lyrics credited to Majrooh Sultanpuri.

=== Discography ===
Number	Song	Singer	Lyricist
1.	"Ke Loot Liya"	Vatsala Kumthekar	Tanveer Naqvi, Rajjan, Hasrat Lakhnavi, Swami Ramanand Saraswati
2.	"Naiya Hamari Paar Lagao"	Sitara Devi	Hasrat Lakhnavi
3.	"Inhi Logon Ne le Leena Dupatta Mera"	Yakub	Tanveer Naqvi, Rajjan, Hasrat Lakhnavi, Swami Ramanand Saraswati
4.	"Piya Milan Ki Rut Aayi Hai"	Sitara Devi, G. M. Durrani	Hasrat Lakhnavi
5.	"Ye Gham Ye Fasaana Hai"	Sitara Devi	Rajjan
6.	"Gori Baanke Naino Se Chalaye Jaadua"	Sitara Devi, G. M. Durrani	Hasrat Lakhnavi
7.	"Sautan Ke Ghar Na Jaiyo"	Sitara Devi	Tanveer Naqvi, Rajjan, Hasrat Lakhnavi, Swami Ramanand Saraswati
8.	"Haaye Kisi Ki Yaad Sataaye"	Sitara Devi	Tanveer Naqvi, Rajjan, Hasrat Lakhnavi, Swami Ramanand Saraswati
9.	"Pune Se Laayi Paan Re"	Sitara Devi, Nazir Ahmad	Tanveer Naqvi, Rajjan, Hasrat Lakhnavi, Swami Ramanand Saraswati
10.	"Hamari Zindagi Kya Hai"	Sitara Devi	Tanveer Naqvi, Rajjan, Hasrat Lakhnavi, Swami Ramanand Saraswati
11.	"Dukh Dard Ke Maare Hai"	Sitara Devi	Tanveer Naqvi, Rajjan, Hasrat Lakhnavi, Swami Ramanand Saraswati
