= Birha Ki Raat =

- Directed by: Gajanan Jagirdar
- Produced by: Noble Art
- Starring: Nargis; Dev Anand; Snehprabha Pradhan
- Music by: Husnlal Bhagatram
- Release date: 1950
- Country: India
- Language: Hindi

Birha Ki Raat is a 1950 Indian Hindi-language film directed by Gajanan Jagirdar. The film's music was composed by Husnlal Bhagatram. The leading cast included Nargis, Dev Anand, and Snehprabha Pradhan; with supporting characters played by Jagirdar, Om Prakash, and Madan Puri.

A reviewer for The Times of India described Birha Ki Raat as a "tepid" and "tiresome" love triangle drama.
