= Sipahiya =

1949 film by Aspi Irani

- Directed by: Aspi Irani
- Produced by: Aspi Irani
- Starring: Madhubala; Yakub
- Music by: C. Ramachandra
- Release date: 1949
- Country: India
- Language: Hindi

Sipahiya is a 1949 Indian thriller film directed and produced by Aspi Irani. It stars Madhubala and Yakub. The music of the film was composed by C. Ramachandra.

== Cast ==
- Madhubala as Rani
- Yakub as Banke
- Agha as Bansi
- Kanhaiyalal as Rasia
- Jilloo as Rani's mother
