= Mera Khwab =

- Directed by: Hansraj Patel
- Produced by: Paras Prakashan
- Music by: Ghulam Mohammed
- Release date: 1943
- Country: India
- Language: Hindi

Mera Khwab is a Bollywood film. It was released in 1943. The film starred Prakash, Zebunissa, Samson, Putlibai, and Abbas. The music director was Ghulam Mohammed and the lyrics were written by M. E. Ashq.
