= Nagad Narayan =

- Release date: 1943
- Country: India
- Language: Hindi

Nagad Narayan is a Bollywood film. It was released in 1943.
