= Nai Zindagi =

- Directed by: S. Khalil
- Starring: Sheikh Mukhtar; Anees Khatoon; Yakub; Gope
- Music by: Vasant Kumar Naidu
- Release date: 1943
- Country: India
- Language: Hindi

Nai Zindagi is a Bollywood film. It was released in 1943.
