= Bhaichara =

- Directed by: G.K. Mehta
- Release date: 1946
- Country: India
- Language: Hindi

Bhaichara is a Bollywood film. It was released in 1943.
