= Rahgeer =

- Directed by: A. Rashid
- Produced by: Rasik Productions
- Starring: Trilok Kapoor; Shantarin; Yakub; Zohra Sehgal
- Music by: Khan Mastana
- Release date: 1943
- Running time: 120 min
- Country: India
- Language: Hindi

Rahgeer is a Bollywood film. It was released in 1943. The film starred Trilok Kapoor, Shantarin, Masood, Yakub, Zohra Sehgal and Shahzadi. The music director was Khan Mastana and the lyricist was Shewan Rizvi.

== Cast ==
- Trilok Kapoor
- Shantarin,
- Yakub
- Zohra Sehgal
- Shahzadi
- Anwaribai
- Habib

== Soundtrack ==
The music for the film was composed by Khan Mastana and lyrics written by Shewan Rizwi. The songs were sung by Khan Mastana, Zohrabai Ambalewali, Amirbai Karnataki, Faizbai and Ayaz.

=== Songs ===
- "Rahgeer Sambhal Kar Chalna" sung by Khan Mastana
- "Kahan Se Aaya Kahan Hai Jaana"
- "Jaa Bhanwre Jaa"
- "Aaja Saaki Aaja" by Khan Mastana
- "Ae Zindagi Hansa De" by Zohrabai, Ayaz
- "Dekho Badal Na Jaana"
- "Ameeri Lee Toh Aisi" by Faizbai, Khan Mastana
- "Apni Toh Zamane Se" by Amirbai Karnataki
- "Thodi Si Khushi Humne Paayi Thi"
