= Mr. Jhatpat =

Mr. Jhatpat is a Bollywood film. It was released in 1943.
