= Laat Saheb =

1946 film

- Directed by: K. P. Bhave
- Produced by: Harishchandra Pictures
- Starring: Latika; Harishchandra Rao; Gope
- Music by: B. Naik
- Release date: 1946
- Country: India
- Language: Hindi

Laat Saheb (Big Lord) is a Hindi language film released in 1946. The film was directed by K. P. Bhave for Harishchandra Pictures. It had music composed by B. Naik. The cast included Latika, Harishchandra Rao, Gope, Anees Katoon and Dalpat.

== Cast ==
- Latika as Asha
- Harishchandra as Harish
- Bibi as Kusum
- Khatun as Billo
- Gope as Motaram
- Vasantrao as Jagdish
- Dalpat as Brijmohan
- Hari Kashmiri as Madhav
- Dhoomad as Manohar Vakil
- P. Mazumder as Balwant
- Laxman as Gangster
- Vithal as Gangster
- Dhondu as Gangster
- Yeshwant as Gangster
- Harish Butka as Gangster
