= Khilona (1942 film) =

- Directed by: Sarvottam Badami
- Produced by: Amar Pictures
- Starring: P. Jairaj; Snehprabha Pradhan; Prabha; Kanhaiyalal
- Music by: Khemchand Prakash
- Production company: Ranjit Studios
- Release date: 1942
- Country: India
- Language: Hindi

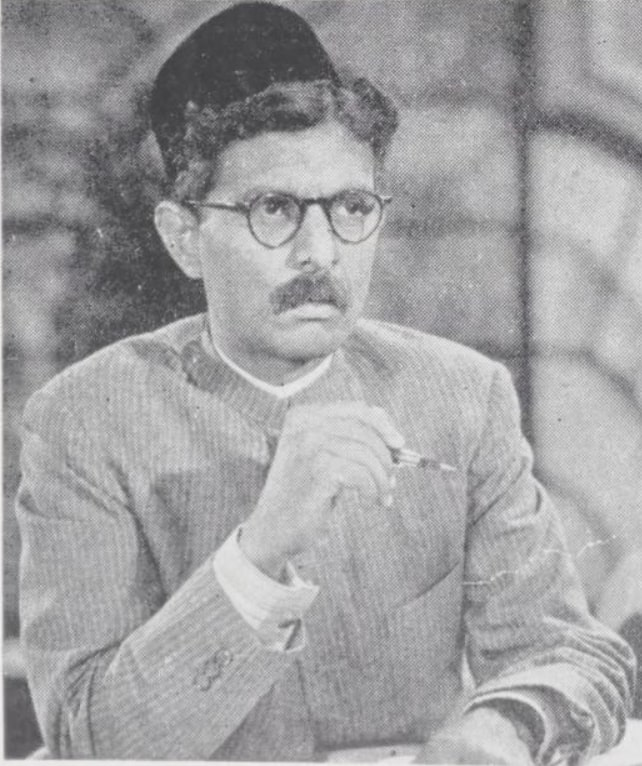
Kanhaiyalal in Khilona (1942)

Khilona (Khilauna/The Toy) is a 1942 social Hindi film directed by Sarvottam Badami. The film was produced at Ranjit Studios by Amar Pictures. It had music by Khemchand Prakash with lyrics by Pandit Indra Chandra. Khilona was one of the major films which brought the actress Snehprabha Pradhan into prominence. The cast included Snehprabha Pradhan, P. Jairaj, Prabha, Satish, Kanhaiyalal and Pratima Devi.

== Cast ==
- Snehprabha Pradhan as Asha
- P. Jairaj as Amar
- Prabha as Maya
- Satish as Kishore
- Kanhaiyalal
- Pratima Devi as Lady Mazumdar
- Devi Mukherjee
- Baburao Sansare as Doctor
- Nagendra as tailor
- Pesi Patel

== Music ==
The film had music by Khemchand Prakash with lyrics by Pandit Indra Chandra. The singers were Snehaprabha Pradhan, Khan Mastana and Sumati Trilokekar. Khemchand Prakash was influenced by Prithviraj Kapoor to make the move from Calcutta to Bombay, where he mainly worked for Ranjit Movietone.

=== Song list ===
| # | Title | Singer |
|---|---|---|
| 1 | "Bindiya Mori Chamakan Lagi" | Snehaprabha Pradhan |
| 2 | "Mile Jule Sab Rang" | Sumati Trilokekar, Khan Mastana |
| 3 | "Dil Unko Dhundta Hai Hum Dil Ko Dhundte Hain" | Snehaprabha Pradhan, Khan Mastana |
| 4 | "Jamuna Kinare Mera Baagh Malaniya Radheshyam Ki" | Snehaprabha Pradhan |
| 5 | "Mai Phiru Bajariya Saari Re" | Snehaprabha Pradhan |
| 6 | "Ham Jinke Mehaman Bane Hain" | Snehaprabha Pradhan |
| 7 | "Bhor Bhaye Ghar Aaye Balam More" | |
| 8 | "Khilauna Hai Tu" | Snehprabha Pradhan |
