= Shirin Farhad (1956 film) =

1956 film directed by Aspi Irani

- Theatrical release poster
- Directed by: Aspi Irani
- Written by: Hakim Riaz Latta
- Screenplay by: Hakim Riaz Latta
- Story by: Hakim Riaz Latta
- Based on: Shirin and Farhad (from Shahnameh)
- Produced by: Aspi Irani
- Starring: Madhubala; Pradeep Kumar
- Music by: S. Mohinder
- Release date: 1956
- Running time: 130 minutes
- Country: India
- Language: Hindustani

Shirin Farhad is a 1956 Indian Hindustani-language romantic drama film directed and produced by Aspi Irani. Based on the Persian romance of Shirin and Farhad, it stars Madhubala as Princess Shirin and Pradeep Kumar as Farhad, her childhood sweetheart, whom she is forbidden to meet and forced to abandon in favour of marrying King Khusro. The film also features P. Kailash and Ameeta.

The film was a box-office success and popularised the pairing of Madhubala and Kumar, who went on to appear together in six more films. Its soundtrack was composed by S. Mohinder and includes the songs "Guzara Hua Zamana" and "Aankhon Mein Tumhare Jalwe Hain". The former was particularly popular with audiences and was featured in Radio Ceylon programmes in subsequent decades.

== Plot ==
Shirin (Baby Leela), the young daughter of a king, visits a museum with her mother and becomes fond of a deer owned by Farhad (Dalpoo), the son of a humble sculptor (Uma Dutt). Although Farhad is forced to part with the animal, he is permitted to visit the palace daily to see it, leading the two children to develop a close attachment to one another.

As Shirin (Madhubala) and Farhad (Pradeep Kumar) grow into youth, Shirin's father begins to disapprove of Farhad's palace visits and eventually forbids the two from meeting. Frustrated by their separation, Farhad destroys statues sculpted by himself and his father. When Shirin pays Farhad a secret visit, her father discovers them, exiles Farhad from the kingdom, and arranges for Shirin to marry Khusro Parvez (P. Kailash), the King of Tehran and an eager suitor.

Shirin travels to Tehran, where her marriage to Khusro is subject to an unusual condition set by her father: the wedding can only take place once Khusro builds a milk-carrying canal into his desert capital that flows directly into Shirin's palace. Farhad follows Shirin to Tehran, wandering the streets in torn clothes with sand-filled hair while chanting her name. Khusro challenges Farhad to dig the milk canal himself, promising to grant him any wish upon completion.

Farhad accepts the task, intending to ask for Shirin's hand as his reward. Realizing that Farhad is on the verge of succeeding, a panicked Khusro plots against him. Even after the miraculous milk-carrying canal is successfully brought into existence, Khusro refuses to accept defeat and sends a false report to Farhad claiming that Shirin has died. Devastated by the news, Farhad inflicts a fatal blow upon himself and dies. Grief-stricken upon learning of Farhad's death, Shirin rushes out of the palace amid a sudden storm, and is swallowed up by the same grave that holds Farhad.

== Cast ==
Listed in the order of appearance in the opening credits:

- Madhubala as Shirin
- Pradeep Kumar as Farhad
- P. Kailash as Khusro Parvez
- Ameeta as Shama
- Kamal
- Ram Avtar as Shakroo
- Uma Dutt as Farhad's father
- Nagpal
- H. Prakash
- Jagdish Kamal
- Shakuntala
- Ashabai as Kalima
- Deepak
- Baby Leela as young Shirin
- Dalpoo
- Ashok
- Bela Bose as Miriam, Khusro's first wife (credited as Bela)
- Bilqis
- Lily
- Kumari Asha

== Production ==
The film is based on the Persian love legend of Shirin and Farhad, as recounted in the Shahnameh. Other notable adaptations of the story in the Indian subcontinent include Homi Master's silent film Shirin Farhad (1926), J. J. Madan's musical talkie Shirin Farhad (1931), and Sharif Nayyar's Pakistani film Shireen Farhad (1975).

Hakim Riaz Latta is credited with the film's story, scenario, and dialogue. Producer-director Aspi Irani spent six months searching for an actress to play the title role of Shirin, as several leading Indian actresses—along with Pakistani actresses Sabiha Khanum and Noor Jehan—declined the part due to scheduling conflicts with other productions. In January 1956, Indian Daily Mail reported that Madhubala had been cast in the role.

Principal photography for Shirin Farhad began at Basant Studios, Bombay, in early 1956. The film is partially in Gevacolor. During production, Filmindia wrote that the title role could be "perhaps the greatest role of [Madhubala's] life".

== Soundtrack ==
The soundtrack was composed by S. Mohinder, while Tanvir Naqvi wrote the lyrics. The qawwali "Aankhon Mein Tumhare Jalwe" was written by Saba Afghani.

No.	Title	Singer(s)	Length
1.	"Guzra Hua Zamana, Aata Nahi Dobara"	Lata Mangeshkar
2.	"Hazaron Rang Badlega Zamana"	Mohammed Rafi
3.	"Na Hanso Pyar Pr"	Mohammed Rafi
4.	"Aankhon Mein Tumhare Jalwe"	Mohammad Rafi
5.	"Na Tajshahi Na Badshahi"	Mohammed Rafi
6.	"Mera Aagaz Shirin Hai"	Asha Bhonsle, Hemant Kumar
7.	"Bichde Hue Milenge Phir"	Asha Bhonsle
8.	"Do Hi Lafzon Ka"	Talat Mahmood
9.	"Are Dilruba, Jaan-e-Wafa"	Asha Bhonsle, Hemant Kumar
10.	"Aaja O Jaan-e-Wafa"	Lata Mangeshkar, Hemant Kumar
11.	"Aasman Wale Bata De"	Lata Mangeshkar

== Themes and influences ==
While the film draws on the literary tradition of the Shirin and Farhad romance, its portrayal of the lovers also reflects the influence of the Layla and Majnun legend. The depiction of Farhad as an archetypal suffering lover, akin to Majnun, is evident in his childhood romance with Shirin and a later scene in which Farhad is stoned by townsmen for his frenzied behaviour.

The film departs from Nizami Ganjavi's account by portraying King Khusro as an evil ruler who plots to eliminate Farhad, rather than as an able king whose character develops through love. The film also introduces characters absent from its literary versions, including Shama (played by Ameeta), a slave girl in love with Khusro, who helps him plot Farhad's death. The film's climax reunites Shirin and Farhad in death, to the king's dismay; while in Nizami's version, Shirin later takes her own life after Khusro is murdered.

In Bombay Cinema's Islamicate Histories (2022), Sunil Sharma considers the film's representation of Persian culture less authentic than that of Sohrab Modi's historical films. Sharma notes that its qawwalis and other orientalist elements lend it an Islamicate character, while its more distinctly Iranian features include the décor of Khusro's palace and references to Nowruz.

=== Musical sequences ===
The song "Guzara Hua Zamana", sung by Lata Mangeshkar and picturised on Madhubala (as Shirin), features her crossing a desert while expressing the pain of separation from her lover, Farhad. The film also features the devotional qawwali "Aankhon Mein Tumhare Jalwe Hain", performed by qawwals at a dargah. Unlike the street-set qawwalis common in Hindi cinema, the sequence uses a dargah as its setting. The song serves as a choric commentary on Shirin's suffering and her appeal for divine intervention.

== Release ==
The film premiered in Bombay on 11 January 1957.

== Reception ==
=== Critical reception ===
A Times of India review, dated 13 January 1957, carried the headline: "Aspi Irani's Shirin Farhad Is A Gripping Romantic Drama".

In a February 1957 review for Filmindia, critic Baburao Patel panned the film as "clumsy, unimaginative and intensely boring," arguing that it failed to capture the emotional appeal of the classic romance. He also criticized Madhubala's performance, noting that she relied on "silly pouts and stupid stares" while delivering her dialogue in an "affectedly soft and moaning manner".

=== Box office and popularity ===
Shirin Farhad was a box-office success. It popularised the pairing of Madhubala and Pradeep Kumar, who went on to appear together in six more films.

On 13 January 1957, The Bombay Chronicle featured Madhubala on its front page as the "Sunday Star" of the week, praising her "delightful work as the heroine of Shirin Farhad". In 1963, author Rekha Menon described Shirin Farhad as one of the "distinctive and popular" films of Madhubala's career.

== Legacy ==
In 1960, the song "Guzra Hua Zamana" was featured in Atit Ki Yaaden, a listener-authored audio story broadcast on Radio Ceylon's program Panghat Par, where it was used to soundtrack a story of separation and lost romance. The song was later reused in 1970 for another Radio Ceylon interactive program, Drisya Aur Geet.

Following the death of S. Mohinder in 2020, The Hindu critic Anuj Kumar noted that the music of Shirin Farhad—particularly the song "Guzra Hua Zamana"—remains emblematic of the "golden era" of Hindi film music.
