= Ashirwad =

- Directed by: Ramchandra Thakur
- Starring: Lalita Pawar
- Release date: 1943
- Country: India
- Language: Hindi

Ashirwad is a Bollywood film. It was released in 1943.
