= Nadaan (1943 film) =

- Directed by: Zia Sarhadi
- Release date: 1943
- Country: India
- Language: Hindi

Nadaan is a 1943 Indian Bollywood film. It was the fourth highest grossing Indian film of 1943.

== Cast ==
- Aman as Mukesh
- Noor Jehan as Roopa
- Masood as Anil
