= Duniya Diwani =

- Starring: Bibijan
- Release date: 1943
- Country: India
- Language: Hindi

Duniya Diwani is a Bollywood film. It was released in 1943.
