= Mangharam Udharam Malkani =

Indian scholar (1896–1980)

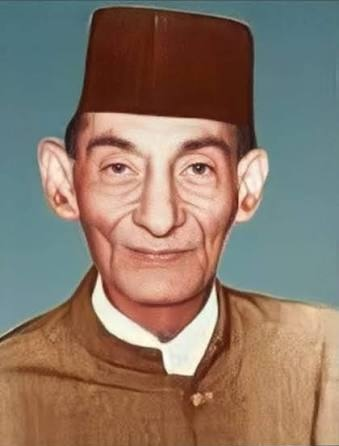
- Born: 24 December 1896; Hyderabad, Sindh, British India
- Died: 1 December 1980 (aged 83); Bombay, India
- Occupations: Sindhi scholar, playwright

Mangharam Udharam Malkani (24 December 1896 – 1 December 1980) was an Indian scholar, critic, writer, playwright, literary historian and professor in the Sindhi language. He was the pioneer of modern Sindhi dramas. He was recognized as the "Grand old man of Sindhi literature".

== Early life and education ==
Malkani was born on 24 December 1896 in Hyderabad, Sindh in the landlord family of Raisahab Udharam Malkani.

He completed his education at D. J. Sindh College in Karachi and later in Bombay. He developed a strong passion for drama during his childhood. While studying at his college in Karachi, he actively participated in all the activities and programs organized by the local amateur drama club.

In 1923, Malkani and K. S. Daryani established the Rabindranath Literary and Dramatic Club in Sindh. Rabindranath Tagore attended its inauguration, during which certain scenes from Tagore's play Chitrangada were presented on stage. Malkani performed the leading role of the hero, and his acting was highly appreciated by Tagore.

== Academic career ==
He joined D. J. Sindh College, Karachi as lecturer of English. After the partition of India, Malkani migrated to India and worked for a long period at Jai Hind College in Bombay, serving as a Professor of English and the Head of the English Department. He earned wide recognition as an expert professor of the English language. Mumbai University appointed him as a member of the Board of Studies for both the Sindhi and English languages. He also served as the president of Sindhi Sahit Mandal (Sindhi literary Society). After retirement, he settled in Kolkata.

He founded Sindhi Adabi Sangat.

== Literary career ==
=== Translations ===
Malkani began his literary journey through translation work. He translated several Bengali stories into Sindhi under the titles Gungi Kunari and Banadevi. Additionally, he translated multiple Western plays into Sindhi.

In 1926, he translated Knoblock's 1911 play Kismet under the same title. In 1929, he translated a play by Shakespeare under the title Dilsoju Dastanu. This was followed in 1930 by a translation of Zangwill's 1908 play The Melting Pot, which he published in Sindhi under the name Ektajo Alapu.

Malkani also translated poetry into Sindhi verse. He selected and translated poems from Rabindranath Tagore's Gardener and Gitanjali, publishing them as Pritija Geet (1940) and Gitanjali (1942) respectively.

He wrote more than 22 books.

He wrote Sindhi Nasar Ji Tarikh (History of Sindhi Prose) for which he received a Sahitya Akademi Award in 1969. Prof Malkani led a delegation of Sindhi writers for Asian Writers’ Conference held in 1956 in New Delhi.

=== Original plays and one-acts ===
Following his translation work, Malkani began writing original drama. His first independent Sindhi play was Khinaji Khata (1930), which won a prize. In the same year, he authored the historical play Anarkali and brought it to the stage, where it achieved significant popularity.

Malkani later focused on writing one-act plays. His one-act play Paap Joki To depicted the consequences of blind love during youth and became highly celebrated. His other notable one-act plays include Panj Nanda Natak (1937), Pangati Parda (1938), Jeevan Chahchita (1957) and Sudkhabita Jya Timkani (1963).

=== Non-fiction and history ===
Malkani authored several major critical, analytical, and biographical books. Adabi Usool (1950) was a high-quality, contemplative book of literary criticism; Pachhimi Yatra (1963) was based on his travel descriptions; Sindhi Nasur Ji Tarikh: 1947 Tai (1968) detailed the history of Sindhi prose literature, which won him a major literary award. In Sahityakarinju Simityu (1979), he compiled the memories and memoirs of his own life.

== Awards and legacy ==
Malkani received the Sahitya Akademi Award for his historical work Sindhi Nasur Ji Tarikh: 1947 Tai (1968). In 1972, he was honored with the Sahitya Akademi Fellowship.

== Death ==
He died on 1 December 1980 in Bombay, India.
