= Rajputani (film) =

- Directed by: Aspi Irani
- Produced by: Ranjit Studios
- Starring: P. Jairaj; Veena; Baby Mumtaz
- Music by: Bulo C Rani
- Release date: 1946
- Country: India
- Language: Hindi

Rajputani is a 1946 Indian Hindi-language film directed by Aspi Irani, and produced under the banner of Ranjit Studios. The leading cast includes P. Jairaj, who portrayed the role of Marwar prince Shakti Singh, and Veena. Rajputani also marks one of the earliest screen appearances of Madhubala, credited as Baby Mumtaz. The film's music was composed by Bulo C Rani.

Rajputani was theatrically released at the Royal Opera House of Bombay in March 1946. It was reported by The Times of India to be popular with audiences.
