= Aspi Irani =

Indian film director

- Born: Aspandiar Hormusji Irani; 8 October 1911
- Disappeared: 23 November 1986 (aged 75)
- Occupation: Film director
- Spouse: Husn Bano
- Relatives: Sharifa Bai (mother-in-law)

Aspandiar Hormusji Irani (born 8 October 1911 – disappeared 23 November 1986), better known as Aspi Irani, was an Indian director who became active in Hindi cinema in 1935. He was known for directing primarily B-grade action films and fantasies. One of his most successful films was Shirin Farhad (1956), a romantic drama which starred Madhubala and Pradeep Kumar as the eponymous lovers.

His other notable films included Return of Toofan Mail (1942), Caravan (1944), Pujari (1946), Sipahiya (1949), Qaidi No. 911 (1959), Nishan (1965), and Garam Masala (1972). Irani had a pivotal role in providing early opportunities to newcomers Shammi Kapoor and Sanjeev Kumar, whom he directed in Gul Sanobar (1953) and Nishan (1965), respectively.

In his private life, Irani married actress Husn Bano. He went missing in 1986.

== Filmography ==
Year	Title	Notes	Ref.
1936	Smuggler		
1936	Sundari	Also known as Pranay Geet and Song of Love	
1937	Naujawan		
1938	Vasant Bengali		
1939	Flying Rani		
1940	Jai Swadesh		
1940	Vijay Kumar		
1942	Return of Toofan Mail		
1943	Andhera		
1944	Caravan		
1944	Pagli Duniya		
1946	Pujari		
1946	Rajputani		
1947	Chheen Le Azadi		
1948	Pardesi Mehmaan		
1949	Sipahiya		
1951	Bade Bhaiya		
1951	Maya Machhindra / Gorakhnath	Marathi and Hindi film	
1953	Gul Sanobar		
1955	Doctor Daku		
1956	Shirin Farhad		
1958	Naya Paisa		
1959	Qaidi No. 911		
1960	Barood		
1964	Shabnam		
1965	Khakaan		
1965	Nishan		
1966	Badal		
1970	Insaan Aur Shaitan	Credited as "Aspi Irani"	
1972	Garam Masala		
