= Inkaar (1943 film) =

- Starring: Jagdish Sethi
- Release date: 1943
- Country: India
- Language: Hindi

Inkaar is a Bollywood film. It was released in 1943.
