= Aahuti (1950 film) =

- Directed by: Kulbhushan
- Produced by: L. Shankar
- Starring: Cuckoo; Indubala; Vikram Kapoor; Mumtaz Shanti
- Music by: D. C. Dutt (songs); Indeevar (lyrics); Tandon Jodhpuri (lyrics)
- Release date: 1950
- Country: India
- Language: Hindi

Aahuti is 1950 Bollywood film produced by L. Shankar and directed by Kulbhushan. The film was released under the banner of Sansar Movietone Ltd.

== Cast ==
The cast has been listed below:

- Prem Kant
- Cuckoo
- Shyama Kesari
- Indubala
- Vikram Kapoor
- Mumtaz Shanti

== Music ==
1. "Dil Ke Bas Mein" – Geeta Dutt, Shankar Dasgupta
2. "Dil Jo Tumko De Diya" – Geeta Dutt
3. "Lehron Se Khele Chanda" – Geeta Dutt, Shankar Dasgupta
4. "Suraj Laga" – Shankar Dasgupta, Geeta Dutt
5. "Taron Bhari Chunariya" – Geeta Dutt
6. "Char Dino ki Atkheliya" – Geeta Dutt, Shanti Varma
7. "Neha Laga" – Shamshad Begum
8. "Mar Ke Jeena Bhi Hai" – Shankar Dasgupta
9. "Ab Toh Hand Mein Hand Nahin" – Tun Tun
10. "Agar Bhagwan Tum Humko Kahin Ladki Bana Dete" (male) – S. D. Batish
11. "Agar Bhagwan Tum Humko Kahin Ladki Bana Dete" (female) – Kalyani Bai
