= Bhookh (1947 film) =

- Screen shot of Sheikh Mukhtar, Kanhaiyalal and Husna in Bhookh
- Directed by: Safdar Aah
- Written by: Safdar Aah
- Starring: Sheikh Mukhtar; Husna; Kanhaiyalal; Agha
- Music by: Anil Biswas
- Release date: 1946
- Country: India
- Language: Hindi

Bookh (Hunger) is a Bollywood film. It was released in 1947. Safdar Aah, a writer and lyricist, turned producer and director with Bhookh. Made under the Rang Mahal Ltd. banner, the film starred Sheikh Mukhtar, Kanhaiyalal, and new find actress Husna, in the main lead with music by Anil Biswas. Actress Kiran played the second female lead in her debut role. Others in the cast included Agha, Dulari, Narmada Shankar and Abu Bakar.

The film was a social drama about the poor trying to earn a living to appease their hunger, only to be oppressed by the rich corporate companies and business men.

== Cast ==
Husna in Bhookh

- Sheikh Mukhtar
- Kanhaiyalal
- Husna
- Agha
- Dulari
- Narmada Shankar
- Abu Bakar

== Soundtrack ==
The music director was Anil Biswas, with lyrics by Safdar Aah. Biswas used Shamshad Begum's voice for the first time in this film. He also sang some of the songs. One of the notable songs was "Dekho Hara Hara Ban Hawa San San San" sung by Shamshad Begum and Biswas, another was "Sare Jag Mein" sung by Biswas himself. Shamshad Begum and Geeta Dutt had first sung together in a group format for the song "Jab Chand Jawan Hoga" with singers Munawwar Sultana and Naseem in Bairam Khan (1946) under the music direction of Ghulam Haider. The song from Bhookh, "Ye Hasino Ke Mele Albele" was their first major duet together and it went on to become a success. The playback singers for the film were Geeta Dutt, Shamshad Begum and Anil Biswas.

=== Songlist ===
#	Title	Singer
1	"Ye Hasino Ke Mele Albele"	Geeta Dutt, Shamshad Begum
2	"Dekho Hara Hara Ban Hawa San San San"	Shamshad Begum, Anil Biswas
3	"Is Jag Me Gareebo Ka Nahi Koi Thikana"	Geeta Dutt
4	"Aankh Me Kyun Ashq Lab Pe Rahe Haye Kyun"	Geeta Dutt
5	Banka Chaila Motorva Udaye Liye Jaye	Shamshad Begum
6	"Jai Janani Bharat Mata Tere Kunj Kunj Hariyali"	
7	"Sona Chandi Khao Ameero"	
8	"Sare Jag Me Pet Ka Dhandha"	Anil Biswas
