= Naukar (1943 film) =

1943 film

- Directed by: Shaukat Hussain Rizvi
- Written by: Saadat Hasan Manto
- Starring: Chandra Mohan; Noor Jehan
- Release date: 1943
- Running time: 121 minutes
- Country: India
- Language: Hindi

Naukar is a 1943 Indian Bollywood film directed by Shaukat Hussain Rizvi and starring Chandra Mohan, Noor Jehan and Shobhna Samarth. It was the fifth-highest-grossing Indian film of 1943.

== Cast ==
This is the list of actors and actresses in this film.

- Chandra Mohan as Fazlu
- Noor Jehan
- Mirza Musharraf
- Shobhna Samarth as Nargis
- Balwant Singh as Salim, son of Fazlu
- Yakub as Sadiq

== Film crew ==
Film musical score was by Rafiq Ghaznavi and Shanti Kumar. Film song lyrics were by Akhtar Sheerani, Munshi Shams and Nazim Panipati.
