= Vakil Saheb =

- Release date: 1943
- Country: India
- Language: Hindi

Vakil Saheb is a 1943 Indian Hindi-language film.
