= Naya Tarana =

- Release date: 1943
- Country: India
- Language: Hindi

Naya Tarana is a Bollywood film. It was released in 1943.
