= Pagli Duniya =

- Directed by: Aspi Irani
- Starring: Kanhaiyalal Chaturvedi; Mumtaz Shanti
- Release date: 1944
- Country: India
- Language: Hindi

Pagli Duniya is a Bollywood film. It was released in 1944.
