= Mumtaz Shanti =

Pre-partition Indian actress (1926–1994)

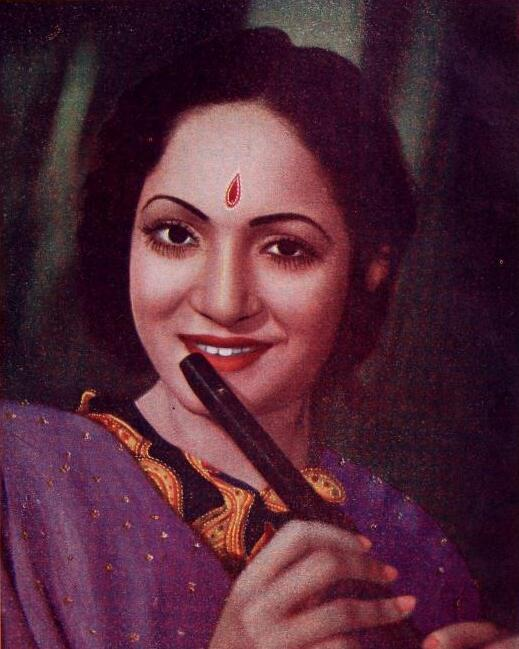
- Shanti in Chand Chakori
- Born: Mumtaz Begum; 28 May 1926; Dinga, Punjab, British India
- Died: 19 October 1994 (aged 68); Lahore, Punjab, Pakistan
- Other name: The Jubilee Girl
- Occupation: Actress
- Years active: 1937–1952
- Spouse: Wali Sahib
- Children: 2
- Relatives: Geeta Nizami (aunt)

Mumtaz Shanti (28 May 1926 – 19 October 1994) was an actress in pre-partition Indian cinema. Working in Bollywood films of the 1940s and also the early 1950s, she moved to Pakistan after the partition of India and retired from her acting career.

She was known as "The Jubilee Girl" because of her roles in films Basant (1942) and Kismet (1943). She worked in films including Mangti (1942), Basant (1942), Badalti Duniya (1943), Kismet (1943), Dharti (1946), Ghar Ki Izzat (1948) and Aahuti (1950).

== Early life ==
Mumtaz was born in 1926 in Dinga, in the Gujrat District of the Punjab Province of British India into a Punjabi Muslim family. Mumtaz's mother died when she was very young and her aunt took care of her. Mumtaz's uncle encouraged her to learn singing and dancing when she was visiting Lahore. Wali Sahab spotted her and then she went to Calcutta and worked in Sohni Kumharan in 1937.

Mumtaz's uncle Barkat Nizami was briefly married to actress Geeta Nizami in the 1940s.

== Career ==
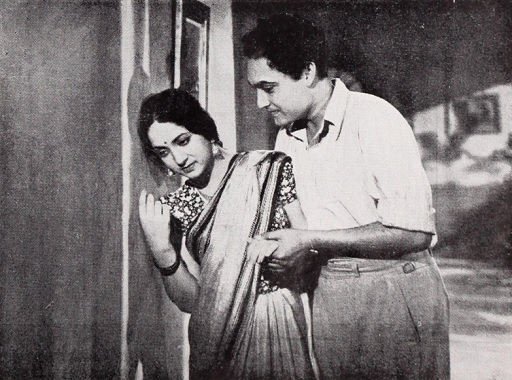
Mumtaz Shanti with Ashok Kumar in Kismet (1943)

Mumtaz Shanti's career peaked in the 1940s and early 1950s with hit movies like Basant (1942), Kismet (1943) with Ashok Kumar, Badalti Duniya and Dharti with Trilok Kapoor, and Ghar Ki Izzat (1948) with a young Dilip Kumar.

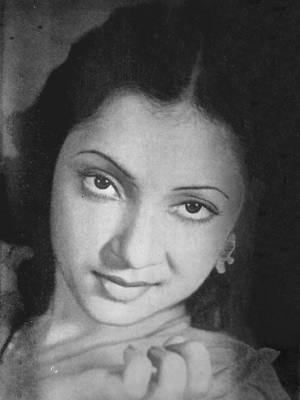
Shanti in Basant (1942)

Kismet was the biggest hit of her career. The film starring her and Ashok Kumar broke all previous records when it came to box office revenues. It ran for a record three years at Kolkata’s Roxy cinema. This record was broken 32 years later by Sholay.

== Personal life ==
Mumtaz Shanti was married to Wali Sahab, a film director and writer in pre-partition Bollywood. After the partition of India, they both moved to Pakistan in the early 1950s and had two sons together. Sahab died of heart failure in 1977.

== Death ==
Mumtaz Shanti died in Pakistan on 19 October 1994.

== Filmography ==
=== Film ===
Year	Film	Language
1937	Sohni Kumharan	Punjabi
1940	Chambe Di Kali	Punjabi
1942	Mangti	Punjabi
1942	Basant	Hindi
1943	Sawaal	Hindi
1943	Badalti Duniya	Hindi
1943	Kismet	Hindi
1944	Bhartruhari	Hindi
1944	Lady Doctor	Hindi
1944	Pagli Duniya	Hindi
1945	Chand Chakori	Hindi
1946	Dharti	Hindi
1946	Magadhraj	Hindi
1946	Pujari	Hindi
1946	Shravan Kumar	Hindi
1947	Diwani	Hindi
1947	Doosri Shadi	Hindi
1948	Ghar Ki Izzat	Hindi
1948	Heer Ranjha	Hindi
1948	Padmini	Hindi
1949	The Honor of the House	Hindi
1950	Aahuti	Hindi
1950	Biwi	Hindi
1950	Putli	Hindi
1952	Sanskar	Hindi
1952	Zamane Ki Hawa	Hindi
