= Ladaai Ke Baad =

- Starring: Sharda
- Release date: 1943
- Country: India
- Language: Hindi

Ladaai Ke Baad is a Bollywood film. It was released in 1943.
