= Pyaas (1941 film) =

- Directed by: Ram Daryani
- Release date: 1941
- Country: India
- Language: Hindi

Pyaas (Thirst in English) is a 1941 Bollywood film directed by Ram Daryani.

== Cast ==
- Ishwarlal
- Snehprabha Pradhan
- Gope
- Nazir
- Shamim
- Gulab
- Khatoon
