= Hindustan Hamara (1940 film) =

- Directed by: Ram Daryani
- Release date: 1940
- Country: India
- Language: Hindi

Hindustan Hamara is a 1940 Bollywood film directed by Ram Daryani.
