= Jeevan (Hindi actor) =

Indian actor (1915–1987)

- Born: Omkar Nath Dhar; 24 October 1915; Srinagar, Jammu and Kashmir, British India
- Died: 10 June 1987 (aged 71); Bombay, Maharashtra, India
- Occupation: Actor
- Years active: 1935–1986
- Children: Kiran Kumar, Bhushan Jeevan

Omkar Nath Dhar (24 October 1915 – 10 June 1987), better known by his stage name Jeevan, was an Indian actor. He played the role of Narad Muni in films of the 1950s, a total of 49 times. Later, he played the villain in popular Bollywood films of the 1960s, 1970s, and 1980s. His son Kiran Kumar (born Deepak Dhar) is also a film and television actor.

== Early life ==
Jeevan was born into an aristocratic Hindu Kashmiri Pandit family. His father, a nobleman, served as the governor of the Gilgit Agency as its Wazir-e-Wazarat (lit Minister of the Ministry or Minister of the Ministers, i.e. Chief Minister) under the suzerainty of princely state of Kashmir. His mother died during childbirth and he lost his father when he was just three years old.

== Career ==
From an early age, Jeevan wanted to be an actor as films had always fascinated him. Since his grandfather was the governor, their family was considered among the nobility. As a son of such a family, joining films would not have been accepted as films were considered taboo, so Jeevan ran away from home at the age of 18 and came to Bombay with only Rs. 26 in his pocket.

After a brief period of struggle, he eventually landed himself a job in the studios of Mohan Sinha (Vidya Sinha's grandfather). His job was to stick silver paper on the reflectors. It was here while working as a reflector boy that he landed a lead role in the movie Fashionable India, which was being made by Mohan Sinha.

It is said that he has played Narad Muni in more than 60 films and theater shows of different languages. His most famous film as Narad Muni was the 1950 hit film Har Har Mahadev with Trilok Kapoor and Nirupa Roy. He became notable otherwise for his roles in Romantic India in 1935, Afasana in 1946 and Station Master in 1942. Jeevan appeared in several Dev Anand films from 1946 to 1978 and in Manmohan Desai movies such as Amar Akbar Anthony and Dharam Veer as villains. He also starred in the Punjabi film Teri Meri Ek Jindri. His last movie was Insaaf Ki Manzil, released in 1986, produced by Ram Nandan Prasad and Directed by Braj Bhushan. He died on 10 June 1987 at the age of 71.

== Selected filmography ==
Year	Film	Role	Notes
1935	Romantic India		
1940	Jagga Daku		Punjabi movie name given in the movie (Dar Kashmiri)
1940	Anuradha		
1942	Station Master		
1948	Ghar Ki Izzat	Moti	
1948	Mela	Mehku	
1949	Karwat		
1949	Shabnam	Anaadi Barua	
1950	Chhai	Lala Carori Mall	Punjabi Movie
1950	Har Har Mahadev		
1950	Jan Pahchan	Jeevan	
1951	Afsana	Chatpat	
1951	Hulchul	Paul	
1951	Tarana	Dr. Motilal's father	
1953	Shole : A Tale of Burning Tears	Popat Lal	
1954	Chandni Chowk	Ibrahim Baig	
1954	Nagin	Pravir	
1956	Anjaan : Somewhere in Delhi	Chandu	
1956	Ek Hi Rasta	Bihari	
1956	Taj	Trishanku Singh	
1957	Nau Do Gyarah	Surjeet	
1957	Naya Daur	Kundan	
1958	Phagun	Madhal	
1958	Do Phool	Masterji	
1960	Kanoon	Kalidas	
1960	Kohinoor		
1962	Rungoli	Sadhuram	
1962	Shiv Parvati	Naradamuni	
1963	Bidesiya	Chhote Thakur	Bhojpuri Film
1964	Main Jatti Punjab Di	Duni Chand	Punjabi film
1964	Zindagi	Banke	
1965	Mahabharat	Shakuni	
1965	Ayeel Basant Bahar		Bhojpuri film
1965	Waqt	Orphanage Warden	
1966	Phool Aur Patthar	Jeevanram	
1966	Dil Ne Phir Yaad Kiya	Bhagat	
1967	Hamraaz	Thakur	
1967	Badrinath Yatra	Shivanand	
1967	Aag		
1968	Aabroo	Darwajalal	
1968	Ankhen	Dr. X	
1968	Aulad	Munim Ramlal	
1969	Bandhan	Jeevanlal	
1969	Talash	John	
1969	Intaquam	Bankelal	
1969	Badi Didi	Lala	
1970	Maharaja	Lala	
1970	Johny Mera Naam	Heera	
1970	Heer Ranjha	Kaazi	
1970	Pardesi	Dharampal	
1970	Mere Humsafar	Mittal	
1972	Garam Masala	Captain Kishore Chandra	
1972	Bhai Ho To Aisa	Ram & Bharat's Mamaji	
1972	Narad Leela	Narad	
1973	Shareef Budmaash	Diwan Saheb	
1973	Anokhi Ada	Khishiram	
1973	Banarasi Babu	V. K. Saxena	
1973	Do Phool	Advocate Vardhraj	
1974	Roti	Lala	
1975	Teri Meri Ik Jindri	Jagga Daku	Punjabi Movie
1975	Ek Gaon ki Kahani	Lala Dindayal	
1975	Anokha	Manchanda	
1975	Dharmatma	Anokhelal	
1976	Sabse Bada Rupaiyaa	Dhanraj	
1976	Sacha Mera Roop Hai	Kudam	Punjabi Movie
1976	Aaj Ka Mahaatma	Head Clerk	
1977	Darling Darling	Dr. Jeevan	
1977	Amar Akbar Anthony	Robert / Albert	
1977	Dharam Veer	Satpal Singh	
1977	Dildaar	Sarpanch Charandas 'Mukhiya'	
1977	Chacha Bhatija	Laxmidas	
1978	Phaansi	Lala	
1979	Dada	Bihari	
1979	Surakshaa	Hiralal	
1979	Gopal Krishna	Narad Muni	
1979	Suhaag	Pascal	
1980	Takkar	Kishan, Vijay & Meena's Mamaji	
1980	Khanjar	Dr. Prem	
1981	Naseeb	Professor Prem	
1981	Lawaaris	Lala	
1981	Professor Pyarelal	Shyamlal / Sammy	
1981	Yaarana	Kishan & Bishan's Mamaji	
1981	Bulundi	Babulal Bhakhri	
1981	Commander	Jagan	
1981	Poonam	Sinha	
1982	Teesri Aankh	Paul	
1982	Ashanti	Malik	
1982	Sanam Teri Kasam	Wilson	
1982	Desh Premee	Munim	
1982	Haathkadi	Suraj	
1983	Nishan	Diwanji	
1984	Zakhmi Sher	Lawyer	
1984	Aan Aur Shaan	Sitaram	
1985	Geraftaar	Lucy's Father	
1986	Insaaf Ki Manzil		
1986	Kala Dhanda Goray Log	Kidnapper	
1986	Ek Aur Sikander	Micheal	
1986	Aakhri Sanghursh		This film was supposed to be released in 1986 but was released in 1997
1991	Iraada	Mr. Gupta	
