= List of Hindi films of 1936 =

A list of films produced by the Bollywood film industry based in Mumbai in 1936:

Kundal Lal Saigal and Jamuna in Devdas, Barua's 1936 Hindi version.

== A ==
| Title | Director | Cast | Genre | Notes |
|---|---|---|---|---|
| Achhut Kanya | Franz Osten | Ashok Kumar, Devika Rani, Mumtaz Ali, Pramila, Sunita Devi, Kusum Kumari, Anwari Bai, Kamta Prasad, Kishori Lal, P. F. Pithavala, Manorama Sr., Chandra Prabha | Social | Bombay Talkies. Music: Saraswati Devi; Lyrics: J. S. Kashyap |
| Ailane Jung a.k.a. Ultimatum | J. P. Advani | Khursheed, Yusuf Effendi, Zebunissa, Prabhashankar, Balabhai, Bibijan, Jani Babu | Costume Action | Sarla Cinetone. Music: Munshi Shams; Lyrics: |
| Akhri Galti | Kanu Roy | Mubarak, Kamla Devi, Meherulnissa, Sohanlal | Costume | Shri Satyanarayan. Music: Lyrics: |
| Amar Jyoti | V. Shantaram | Durga Khote, Chandra Mohan, Shanta Apte, K. N. Kale, Vasanti, Nandrekar, Vasant Desai, Aruna Devi | Action Adventure | Prabhat Film Company. Music: Mastr Krishnarao; Lyrics: Narottam Vyas |
| Amar Prem | Natwar Shyam | Pramila, Ashiq Hussain, Ansuya, S. Nazir, Himmatlal, P. R. Joshi, Samson, Fazlu, Anwaribai | Action | Vishnu Cine. Music: Lyrics: |
| Amar Shaheed | Balasaheb Yadav | Balasaheb Yadav, Shalini, Pawar | Patriotic | Chhatrapati Cinetone. Music: Lyrics: |
| Andheri Duniya | Vishram Bedekar | Damuanna Malvankar, Sushila Devi, Prema Borkar, Chintamani Rao Kolhatkar, Shakuntala Paranjpye, Prem Sawant, Dinanath, Ram Marathe, Ganpatrao | Social | Parijat Pictures. Music: Lyrics: |
| Ansuon Ki Duniya | A. P. Kapoor | Surendra, Sarla, Ghulam Qadir, Urmila, Feroza, Hanuman Prasad, Anwaribai | Social | Amrit Films Music: Jhande Khan; Lyrics: |
| Aseere Hawas | Pandit Shiv Kumar | Gajanan Jagirdar, Ameena, Usha Devi, Jog, Danve, Nabi, Shinde | Social | Shalini Cine. Music: Govind Rao Tembe; Lyrics: |
| Ashiana | Sukumar Dasgupta | Rajkumari, Jeevan, Charlie, Satyanath, Beenu, Lahiri, Ishrat, Devbala, Aziz, Manilal | Social | Kali Films. Music: Niren Lahiri; Lyrics: |
| Azad Veer a.k.a. Revenge | Rasik Bhatt | Rajkumari, Umakant, Jahangir, Jayant, Shirin, Mohini, Esmail, Lallubhai, Rajababu | Action Costume | Prakash Pictures. Music: Lallubhai Naik; Lyrics: Pandit Anuj |

== B ==
| Title | Director | Cast | Genre | Notes |
|---|---|---|---|---|
| Baaz Bahadur | Haribhai Desai | Navinchandra, Sheelprabha, Jenabai Pawar, Bhim, Brijmala, Putlibhai, Kamla, Master Fakira | Historical Legend | Music: Master Madhavlal Damodar; Lyrics: |
| Baghi Sipahi | Abdul Rashid Kardar | Gul Hamid, Patience Cooper, Lalita, Bimla Kumari, Mohammed Ishaq, Anees Khatoon, Kamran, Indubala, Azurie | Costume | East India Film Company. Music: K. C. Dey; Lyrics: Akbar Khan Peshawri |
| Bala Ki Raat a.k.a. One Fatal Night | Modhu Bose | Dhiraj Bhattacharya, May Devi, Geeta Ghosh, Azmat Begum, Zarina, Manilal, Gafoor, Indubala, R. P. Kapoor, Khatoon | | Bengal Talkies. Music: Mushtaq Hussein; Lyrics: |
| Bambai Ki Billi a.k.a. Wildcat | Nandlal Jaswantlal | D. Billimoria, Sulochana (Ruby Myers), Ghulam Mohammed, Pramila, Lakshmi, Abdul Qadir, Baba Vyas, Jamshedji, Khansaheb, Sayed Ahmed, Jilloobai | Social Action | Imperial Pictures. Music: Pransukh Nayak; Lyrics: |
| Banarsi Thug | Rama Chowdhary | Jal Merchant, Mubarak, Shivrani, Apsara, Dixit, Mumtaz, Hirabai Barodekar, Bhagwandas, Sundrabai | | Mayur Movie. Music: S. P. Rane; Lyrics: Pandit Mukhram Sharma, Sagar Hussain |
| Bandit Of The Air a.k.a. Hawai Daku | S. R. Choudhary | Mazhar Khan, Ram Pyari, K. N. Singh, Manjari, Chhotu, Hashmat | Action | Modern India Talkies. Music: Motilal Naik; Lyrics: |
| Bansari Bala | A. M. Khan | Gohar Karnataki, Shanker Vazare, Mansoor, Chhailaram Solanki, Ali Razak, Bachchu, Mirajkar, Bibijan | | Indian Liberty Pictures Music: Damodar Sharma; Lyrics: |
| Berozgar | B. S. Rajhans | Leela Chitnis, P. Jairaj, Gulab, Shyama Zutshi, B. S. Rajhans, Gulshan Soofi, Agha, Ram Panjwani | Social | Indus Film Corp. Music: Ram T. Hira; Lyrics: Munshi Abdul Baqi |
| Bhakta Cheta | Shri Krishna | Ratnaprabha, Mohini, Salvi, B. Sohani, Master Mohan | Devotional | Upper India Cine. Music: R. S. Pathak; Lyrics: Kamal Sane |
| Bharat Ka Lal | S. M. Yusuf | Bhagwan, Chandrarao Kadam, Khatoon, Feroza, K. Nawaz, M. Sadiq, Devangana, Niranjan, Madhavrao | Action | Harishchandra. Music: Amir Khan; Lyrics: |
| Bholi Bhikharan | Babubhai Jani | Mehtab, Mohini, Alaknanda, Keshavrao Mengle, Mumtaz, Ram Marathe, Haridas, Lavji Lavangia, Bachchu | Social | Jayant Pics. Music: Shanti Kumar Desai; Lyrics: |
| Black Box | R. N. Vaidya | Shahjahan, Harishchandra, Dalpat, Bipin Mehta, Nazir Begum, Madhavlal, Dhirajlal | Action Costume | Purnima Pictures. Music: Master Kasam; Lyrics: Pandit Gyan Shankar |
| Bulbul-e-Iran | Faredoon Irani | Khalil, Mahajabin, Abdul Qadir, Ghulam Sabir, Pearl, Ghulam Mustafa, Violet, Agha Jani, Ghulam Hussain | Costume | Madan Theatres. Music: Brijlal Varma; Lyrics: Salim Pratapgarhi |
| Burkhewali | Kikubhai Desai | Gohar, Shankar Vajre, Pearl Bright, Pokhraj, Shiraz, Sardar Mansur, Ali, Bachcha, Shabir, Dhulia | Costume | Indian Liberty. Music: Damodar Sharma; Lyrics: |

== C-D ==
| Title | Director | Cast | Genre | Notes |
|---|---|---|---|---|
| Chalak Chor | Raja Sandow | Ishwarlal, Padma, Dixit, Ghory, Kesari, Charlie, Rewashankar, Khatoon, Ram Apte, Shanta, Raja Sandow | Costume Action | Ranjit Film Company. Music: Banne Khan, Gangaprasad Pathak; Lyrics: Narayan Prasad Betaab |
| Chhaya | Master Vinayak | Leela Chitnis, Master Vinayak, Baburao Pendharkar, Indira Wadkar, Anant Marathe, Ratnaprabha, Hardikar, Pandit Indra Chandra | Social | Huns Pictures. Music: Dhamman Khan; Lyrics: Pandit Indra |
| Chhupa Rustom | R. N. Vaidya | Shahjahan, Vaidya, Agha, Harishchandra, Gyanchandra, Dalpat | Costume | Unity Pictures. Music: Lyrics: |
| Country Girl | Dhiren Ganguly | Hashmat, Nimbalkar, Kamla Jharia, Sham Kumari, Azurie, Premlata | Social | Modern India Theatres. Music: Ramani Mukherjee; Lyrics: |
| Dalit Kusum | M. L. Tandon, Michael Ormalev | Motilal, Prem Kumari, Ahindra Chowdhary, Firoza Khatoon, Kamla Jharia, Akhtar Nawaz, Azurie | | Adarsh Chitra. Music: Zamirudin Khan; Lyrics: Dwarkaprasad Mishra |
| Deccan Queen | Mehboob Khan | Surendra, Aruna Devi, Kayam Ali, Ramchandra, Gulzar, Mehdi Raza, Bhudo Advani, Kamla, Pesi Patel, M. A. Mani, Pande | Action | Sagar Movietone Music: Pransukh Naik, Ashok Ghosh; Lyrics: Zia Sarhadi |
| Derby Ka Shikar | N. G. Bulchandni | Gohar Mamajiwala, Nimbalkar, Vilayat Hussain, Prem Kumari, Dhumi Khan, Radhabai, Kailash, Lalaram, Zohra Sehgal | Social | National Theatres. Music: Sardar Amar Singh; Lyrics: |
| Dil Ka Daku | D. N. Madhok | Ishwarlal, Anees Khatoon, Dixit, Ghory, Charlie, Raja Sandow, Bhupatrai, Ram Apte | Costume | Ranjit Pictures. Music: Banne Khan; Lyrics: Gangaprasad Pathak |
| Dilawar | M. Bhavnani | Motilal, Prabha Devi, Navin Yagnik, Shivrani Jahangir, Nayampalli, A. S. Gyani | Action | Bhavnani Productions. Music: Ganpat Devaskar, A. S. Gyani; Lyrics: Narottam Vyas |
| Din-o-Duniya | H. R. Sethi | Hiralal, Prem Kumari, A. Shah, Mukta Devi, Bhagsingh | Action | Moonlight Pics. Music: G. A. Chishti; Lyrics: Wali Saheb |
| Do Diwane | C. M. Luhar | Motilal, Shobhana Samarth, Yakub, Gulzar, Kayam Ali, Sankatha Prasad, Bhudo Advani, Aruna Devi, Pesi Patel, Mehdi Raza | Social | Sagar Movietone. Music: Pransukh Naik; Lyrics: Raghunath Brahmabhatt |

== E-H ==
| Title | Director | Cast | Genre | Notes |
|---|---|---|---|---|
| Farz-e-Ada | A. M. Khan | Shahzadi, Shankar Vajre, Sardar Mansur, Bibijan, Vidya Devi, Ata Mohammed, Ali, Roshan | Costume | Indian Liberty. Music: Damodar Sharma; Lyrics: |
| Fauladi Mukka | R. N. Vaidya | Husn Banu, Shahjahan, Sayani Atish, Harishchandra Rao, Nazir Begum, Dalpat, Master Chhotu, Minoo Cooper | Action | Wadia Movietone. Music: Master Mohammed; Lyrics: Gyanchand |
| Fida-E-Watan | G. R. Sethi | Sardar Akhtar, Yusuf Effendi, Gulzar, Indurani, Gope, Prem Kumari, Amirbai Karnataki | Costume Action | Daryani Production. Music: Anil Biswas, Zhande Khan; Lyrics: Gauri Shankarlal Akhtar |
| Garib Pariwar | M. Bhavnani | Bibbo, P. Jairaj, Ameena, Tara, Nayampalli, Bhudo Advani, Khalil | Costume Drama | Ajanta Cine. Music: Lyrics: |
| Gazi Diler | G. K. Mehta, K. Shah | Navinchandra, Padmavati, Amritlal Nagar, Manibai, Shamsad | Costume | Sarla Cine. Music: Banne Khan, Rewashankar; Lyrics: |
| Gol Nishan | M. Udwadia | Gohar Karnataki, Navinchandra, Brijmala, Shilprabha, Fakir Mohammed, Amritlal Nagar, Bhim | Social | Navbharat. Music: Lyrics: Dhaniram Prem |
| Graduate a.k.a. Parivartan | Ezra Mir | Jahanara Kajjan, Khalil, Indubala, Akhtar Nawaz, Mohamed Hussain | Social | Music: Chhailaram Solanki; Lyrics: |
| Grama Kanya a.k.a. Village Girl | Sarvottam Badami | Sabita Devi, Surendra, Yakub, Aruna Devi, Kayam Ali, Sankatha Prasad, Jamu Patel, Baby Indira | Social | Sagar Movietone. Music: Shankarrao Khatu; Lyrics: |
| Gulam Daku | Moti Gidwani | Rose, Ghulam Mohammed, Jamna, Jamshedji, Rafique Ghaznavi, Jilloobai, Sayed Ahmed, Ghulam Rasool, Rustom Poonawala | Action | Imperial Film Company. Music: Lyrics: |
| Gunehgar | H. R. Soni, Baba Kesar Singh | Gohar Mamajiwala, Haidar Shah, Marutirao, Kamla Kumari, Soni, Manmohan, Shamsuddin | Social | Venus Movies. Music: Jati Baksh, A. Shah; Lyrics: Kailash Matwala |
| Hamari Betiyan | Rama Choudhry | Mubarak, Kumar, Rose, Pramila, Jilloobai, Baba Vyas | Social | Imperial Film Company. Music: Annasaheb Mainkar; Lyrics: |
| Hind Mahila | Premankur Atorthy | Master Vithal, Rattan Bai, Shahu Modak, Sudhabala, Hafisji, Raja Pandit | Social | Kolhapur Cine. Music: H. C. Bali; Lyrics: |
| Honhar | Gajanan Jagirdar | Shahu Modak, Rajkumari, Mehar Sultana, Gajanan Jagirdar, Leela Mishra | Devotional | Kolhapur Cine. Music: Gandopat Valvalkar; Lyrics: Anand Kumar |
| Hoor-E-Samundar | Dhirubhai Desai | Ashiq Hussain, Sultana, Ansuya, Kantilal | | Vishnu Cine Music: Lyrics: |
| Hriday Manthan | Jaddanbai | Ashiq Hussain, Urmila Devi, Baby Nargis, Shahzadi, Siddiqui, Yusuf, Jaddanbai | Social | Sangeet Film Co. Music: Jaddanbai; Lyrics: Ashiq Hussain |

== J-L ==
| Title | Director | Cast | Genre | Notes |
|---|---|---|---|---|
| Jagran | M. Bhavnani | Enakshi Rama Rao, Navin Yagnik, Narottam Vyas, Prabha Devi, Nayampalli, Shivrani Ghosh, Narendranath Tuli, S. L. Puri, Gyani, Abu Bakar | Social | Bhavnani Productions. Music: S. P. Mukherjee; Lyrics: Narottam Vyas |
| Jai Bharat | Homi Master | Husn Banu, Jal Khambatta, Sardar Mansur, Gulshan, Sayani Atish, Master Mohammed, Bismillah | Action | Wadia Movietone Music: Master Mohammed; Lyrics: Gyanchand |
| Janbaz Malika | N. G. Bulchandani | Nimbalkar, Prem Kumari, A. Kabuli, Azurie, Rampyari, Anwaribai, R. P. Kapoor, Hamida Banu, Akhtari | Costume | National Theatres. Music: S. Amarsingh; Lyrics: Pandit Ugra |
| Janmabhoomi | Franz Osten | Ashok Kumar, Devika Rani, Pramila, Mumtaz Ali, Chandraprabha, P. F. Pithavala, Zaverbhai Kaiser, Kamta Prasad, Khosla, N. M. Joshi | Social | Bombay Talkies. Music: Saraswati Devi; Lyrics: J. S. Kashyap |
| Jate Sharif | Homi Master | Heera, Jumuna, Jamshedji, Rustom Poonawala, Ghulam Rasool, Sayed Ahmed | Action | Imperial Film Co. Music: Jamshedji; Lyrics: Sagar Hussain |
| Jeevan Lata | Sarvottam Badami | Motilal, Sabita Devi, Gulzar, Sankatha Prasad, Sushila, Mehdi Raza, Bhudo Advani, Pande | Social | Sagar Movietone. Music: Pransukh Naik; Lyrics: |
| Jeevan Naiya | Franz Osten | Ashok Kumar, Devika Rani, Pramila, Mumtaz Ali, Sumita Devi, Chandraprabha, P. F. Pithavala, Kusum Kumari, Kamta Prasad, Anwaribai | | Music: Saraswati Devi; Lyrics: J. S. Kashyap |
| Jungle Queen | Nandlal Jaswantlal | D. Billimoria, Sulochana (Ruby Myers), Jamshedji, Syed Ahmed, Lakshmi, Jilloobai, Ghulam Rasool | Action | Imperial Film Co. Music: Annasaheb Mainkar, H. C. Bali; Lyrics: |
| Jwalamukhi | D. N. Madhok | Padma Devi, Ishwarlal, Khatoon, Shanta Devi, Ghory, Bhupatrai, Charlie | Social | Ranjit Film Company. Music: Rewa Shankar; Lyrics: D. N. Madhok |
| Kadakti Bijli | G. R. Sethi | Rajkumari, Radha Rani, Bashir, Kabuli, Chanda | Action | Radha Film Company. Music: Lyrics: |
| Karodpati a.k.a. Millionaire | Hemchandra Chunder | K. L. Saigal, Sardar Akhtar, Molina, Pahari Sanyal, Nawab, Jagdish Sethi, Trilok Kapoor, Rajkumari, Kidar Sharma, Amar Mullick, Devbala, Nemo, Durgadas Bannerjee | Social Drama | New Theatres. Music: R. C. Boral, Pankaj Mullick; Lyrics: Kidar Sharma |
| Khooni Kaun | G. R. Sethi | Kanan Devi, A. R. Kabuli, Khatoon, Jawahar, B. Roy | Suspense | Radha Film Company. Music: Lyrics: Munshi Nashir |
| Khyber Pass | Gul Hamid | Gul Hamid, Patience Cooper, Mazhar Khan, Lalita Devi, Indubala, Purnima, Hasndid, Pahelwan | Action | East India Film Company. Music: Lyrics: |
| Kimiagar a.k.a. Museum | Nagendra Majumdar | Nissar, Khursheed, Shakir, Jani Babu, Kitty William | Action | Saroj Movies. Music: Mir Sahib; Lyrics: |
| Lagna Bandhan | K. P. Ghose | Motilal, Sabita Devi, Aruna Devi, Leelavati, Gulzar, Mehdi Raza, Pesi Patel, Bhudo Advani, Azurie, Sankatha Prasad, Ansari | Social | Sagar Movietone. Music: Pransukh Naik; Lyrics: |
| Laheri Lala | Jayant Desai | Madhuri, E. Billimoria, Ghory, Dixit, Charlie, Ishwarlal, Khatoon, Keki Adjania, Ram Apte | Action | Ranjit Pictures. Music: Banne Khan, Rewashankar; Lyrics: Narayanprasad Betab |
| Lal Punja | K. B. Desai | Shiraz, Manjri, Razaq Ali, Bachcha, Dhulia, Sandow, Subhash | Costume | Paramount. Music: Lyrics: |
| Laylo Nehar | R. J. Ashar | Rafique Ghaznavi, Zubeida, Dulari, Syed Ahmed, Ghulam Rasool | Costume | Music: Annasaheb Mainkar; Lyrics: Munshi Manjar |

== M-N ==
| Title | Director | Cast | Genre | Notes |
|---|---|---|---|---|
| Maa | Prafulla Ghosh | Kanan Devi, Jal Merchant, Zubeida, Mohammed Ishaq, Manorama Sr., Rashbihari Bose, Kusum Kumari, Master Vrajmohan | Social | Prafulla Pics. Music: S. P. Rane; Lyrics: B. N. Gupta |
| Maa Ki Mamta | J. J. Madan | Phool Kumari, Rajmani, Surajram, Akar, Angurbala, Anwaribai, Lakshman, Maneklal | Social | Kesari Films. Music: Sabar Khan; Lyrics: |
| Madam Fashion | Jaddanbai | Ansari, Ashiq Hussain, Jaddanbai, P. Bose, Baby Nargis, Misra, Yusuf | Social | Sangeet Movies. Music: Jaddanbai; Lyrics: Jaddanbai |
| Mahamaya | Gunjal | Ghulam Mohammed, Pramila, Kumar, Sayed Khan, Lalita, Asooji, Alidadan, Jilloobai | Social | Imperial Film Co. Music: Annasaheb Mainkar; Lyrics: |
| Mamta And Miya Biwi | Franz Osten | Devika Rani, Najmul Hussain, Sunita Devi, J. S. Kashyap, P. F. Pithavala, Kamta Prasad, Chandra Prabha, | Social | Music: Saraswati Devi; Lyrics: J. S. Kashyap |
| Manmohan | Mehboob Khan | Surendra, Bibbo, Yakub, Ashalata, Kayam Ali, Kashmiri, Bhudo Advani, Zia Sarhadi, Pesi Patel, Pande, Mehdi Raja | Social | Sagar Movietone. Music: Ashok Ghosh; Lyrics: Zia Sarhadi |
| Manzil | P. C. Barua | P. C. Barua, Jamuna, Prithviraj Kapoor, Pahari Sanyal, Molina, Sitara Devi, K. C. Dey, Nemo, Shore, Bikram Kapoor, Boken Chatto | Social Family Drama | New Theatres Music: R. C. Boral; Lyrics: Arzu Lucknavi |
| Mard Ka Bachcha | M. Udwadia | Aruna Devi, M. Mohammed, Zohra Sehgal, Amir Hussain, Fakir Mohammed, Jay Kumar | Action | Krishna. Music: Lyrics: |
| Mastana Mashooq | A. M. Khan | Yashwant Dave, Ansuya, Master Nissar, Himmatlal, Fazlu, Samson, Bulbule, Kantilal, Ata Mohamed, P. R. Joshi, Bibijan | Action | Vishnu Cine. Music: Pandit Hansraj; Lyrics: |
| Matlabi Duniya | Jayant Desai | Madhuri, Ishwarlal, Ram Apte, Kamala Kumari, Charlie, Ghory, Dixit, Khatoon, Raja Sandow, Shanta, Charubala | Social | Ranjit Pictures. Music: Banne Khan, Rewashankar; Lyrics: |
| Matwali Jogan | K. Amarnath | Rajkumari, Ermeline, S. Nazir, Rajinder Singh, Vimla, Putlibai, Azurie, Shahani, Miss Pokhraj | Devotional | Metro. Music: Ram Gopal Pande; Lyrics: Kabil Amritsari |
| Maya | P. C. Barua | Pahari Sanyal, Jamuna, Sitara Devi, Raj Lakshmi, Boken Chatterjee, Azurie, Nawab, Nemo, K. C. Dey, Nani Bandhopadhay, Indu Mukherjee, Babulal | Social Romance | New Theatres Music: R. C. Boral, Pankaj Mullick; Lyrics: Asghar Hussain |
| Miss Frontier Mail | Homi Wadia | Fearless Nadia, Sardar Mansur, John Cawas, Sayani Atish, Jaidev, Gulshan, Jal Khambhata, Manchi Thoothi, Minoo Cooper | Action Adventure | Music: Master Mohammed; Lyrics: |
| Mohabbat Ka Toofan | Fram Sethna | Patience Cooper, Dalsukh, Shivlal, Master Mohan | Action | Pioneer Film Company. Music: Lyrics: |
| Mr. & Mrs. Bombay | Nanubhai Vakil | Zubeida, Jal Merchant, Ghulam Hussain, Mustafa, Baby Noor Jehan | Action | Music: Chhailaram Solanki, S. P. Rane; Lyrics: Motilal Mishra |
| Nari Raj a.k.a. Miss Calcutta | Nanubhai Vakil | Jahanara Kajjan, Jal Merchant, Abdur Rehman, Mubarak, Ghulam Hussain, Mushtaq Hussain, Phool Kumari, Baby Noor Jehan | Costume | Music: Chhailaram Solanki; Lyrics: |
| Nasib Ka Chakkar | Pesi Karani | Mohammed Ishaq, Akhtari, Angurbla, Maneklal, Lakshmandas, Rajmani, Baby Yvonne | Social | Manohar Films. Music: Lyrics: |
| Nazar Ka Shikar | A. P. Kapoor | Rajkumari, Sitara Devi, Marutirao, Baburao, Khatoon, Abu Bakar | Action | Kumar M. Music: Lyrics: Munshi Asif |
| Noor-E-Wahadat | G. R. Sethi | Mazhar Khan, Lalita Devi, Patience Cooper, Nand Kishore, Azurie, Purnima | Costume | East India. Music: Motilal Naik; Lyrics: |

== O-R ==
| Title | Director | Cast | Genre | Notes |
|---|---|---|---|---|
| Pahadi Kanya | Harshadrai Mehta | Fearless Nadia, John Cawas, Sharifa, Sardar Mansur, Gulshan, Jal Khambatta, Boman Shroff, Master Mohammed, Bismillah | Action | Wadia Movietone. Music: Master Mohammed; Lyrics: |
| Passing Show | Dwarka Khosla | Jayant, Padma Devi, Umakant, Shirin, Jahangir, Ismail, M. Luhar, Lallubhai | Action | Prakash Pictures. Music: Lallubhai Nayak; Lyrics: Pandit Anuj |
| Piya Ki Jogan | Hiren Bose | Sardar Akhtar, Nirmal, Pramod Chandra, M. Irani, Krishna Kumari, Ashalata, Shaila, Agha, Kashmiri, D. Manek | Social | Music: Anil Biswas; Lyrics: Zahirudin |
| Prabhu Ka Pyara | Chandulal Shah | Gohar Mamajiwala, E. Billimoria, Ishwarlal, Khatoon, Charubala, Kanka, Keki Adajania, Ram Apte, Raja Sandow | Social | Ranjit Film Company. Music: Zhande Khan, Banne Khan; Lyrics: Narayan Pasad Betab |
| Pratima | Ram Daryani | Nazir, Sardar Akhtar, Gope, Indukumari, D. Manek, Afzal, Mehar Banu, Omkar Devaskar, Amirbai Karnataki | Social | Daryani Production. Music: Anil Biswas; Lyrics: Gauri Shankarlal Akhtar |
| Prem Bandhan | Ramnik Desai, C. N. Lala | Sardar Akhtar, Madhav Kale, Sitara Devi, Benjamin, Gangadhar Sharma, Putlibai, Devaskar, Amirbai Karnataki, Laxmi, Panna, Solanki | | Music: Anil Biswas, Zhande Khan; Lyrics: Gauri Shankarlal Akhtar |
| Prem Ki Aag | M. L. Kapoor | Mukhtar Begum, A. R. Akhtar, Safdar, F. M. Butt, D. N. Uppal, Pranshankar, Bhai Desa, Haseena | Romantic Drama | Mukhtiar Films. Music: Mukhtar Begum; Lyrics: A. Jabbar Sher Hashri |
| Prem Ki Devi | Sorabji Kerawala | Ghulam Sabir, Rani Premlata, Zahur Ahmed, Imam Bandi, S. Kerawala | Devotional | Star Movies. Music: Chhailaram Solanki; Lyrics: |
| Prem Laksha | Fram Sethna | Bimla Kumari, Mubarak, Mustafa, Dilara, Hashmat, Ghulam Hussain, Nawabbanu Hyderabadi | Social | W. I. Films. Music: Lyrics: Inayat |
| Prem Ratri | Dwarka Khosla | Nazir, Yasmin, Shanta Kumari, Firoze Dastur, Gope, Hari Shivdasani, Gidwani, D. Sarkari | Costume | Eastern Arts. Music: Lyrics: Gauri Shankarlal Akhtar |
| Pujarin | Prafulla Roy | K. L. Saigal, Pahari Sanyal, Rajkumari, Chandra, Nawab, Shyam Laha, K. C. Dey, Kidar Sharma, Kailash, Babulal | Social | New Theatres. Based on Dena Paona by Saratchandra Chatterjee. Music: Timir Baran; Lyrics: Kidar Sharma |
| Punjab Ka Sinha | Kanjibhai Rathod | Ashiq Hussain, Ansuya, Gulab, Fazlu, Kantilal, P. R. Joshi, Ebrahim, Samson | Action | Vishnu Cine. Music: Kantilal Pachhigar; Lyrics: Lalitprasad Akhtar |
| Raiders Of The Railroad | H. S. Thakur | Usharani, Prakash, Sushila, Kamala Kumari, Kailash, H. Singh, Vilas, Mohammed Nazir | Action | Capital Cine. Music: M. Zahur, Dayal Goswami; Lyrics: Wali Saheb, Hukum Singh |
| Raj Dulari | Ramnik Desai | Jahanara Kajjan, Sheela, Khalil, Mohammed Hussain | Costume | Madan Theatres. Music: Lyrics: |
| Raj Natee | Charu Roy | Bashir, Bina Devi, P. Verma, Nimbalkar | Costume | Radha Film Company. Music: Lyrics: |
| Raj Ramani | Jayant Desai | Madhuri, E. Billimoria, Gohar Mamajiwala, Charlie, Dixit, Ghory, Keki Adjania, Rewashankar, Shanta, Bhupatrai, Ishwarlal | Costume | Ranjit Film Company. Music: Banne Khan, Rewashankar; Lyrics: Narayanprasad Betab |
| Rajput Ramani | K. Dhaiber | Nalini Tarkhud, Kelkar, Shanta Apte, Buwa Saheb, Pathak, Mane, Chhotu | Costume Action Drama | Prabhat Film Company. Music: Keshavrao Bhole; Lyrics: Narottam Vyas |
| Rangila Raja | Jayant Desai | Madhuri, E. Billimoria, Gohar Mamajiwala, Charlie, Dixit, Ghory, Keki Adjania, Rewashankar, Khatoon, Kesari, Charubala, Bhupatrai, Ishwarlal | Costume | Ranjit Films. Music: Rewashankar; Lyrics: Zia Sarhadi |
| Romantic India | Mohan Sinha | Prem Adib, Radharani, Nurjahan, Snehlata, Shyam Sunder, Lily, Jeevan, Badri Prasad, Munshi Khanjar | Costume | Rajputana Films. Music: Badri Prasad; Lyrics: |

== S-Z ==
| Title | Director | Cast | Genre | Notes |
|---|---|---|---|---|
| Said-e-Havas a.k.a. Prey To Desire or Greed or King John | Sohrab Modi | Sohrab Modi, Gulzar, Sadat Ali, Fakir Mohammed, Shama, E. Tarapore, Chandra Kumar, Fakir Mohammed, Sarla Devi, Ghulam Hussain | Drama | Stage Film Company. Based on Shakespeare's King John. Music: Bunyad Husain Khan |
| Sagar Ki Kanya | Hendry Dargwitch | Sultana, Gulzar, Shantaram, F. M. Butt, Roshanara, Shankarrao, Hemprabha | | Vijay Pictures. Music: Shankar Rao Khatu; Lyrics: |
| Sangdil Samaj | Ram Daryani | Nazir, Sardar Akhtar, Padma Devi, Gope, Kamlakar, Omkar, Kamla Varekar, Sadiq Ali, Hari Shivdasani | | Daryani Production. Music: Anil Biswas; Lyrics: Gauri Shankarlal Akhtar |
| Sant Tukaram | V. G. Damle, Sheikh Fattelal | Vishnupant Pagnis, Gauri, B. Nandrekar, Kusum Bhagwat, Shankar Kulkarni, Master Chhotu, Pandit Damle | Biopic Devotional | Prabhat Film Company. Music: Keshavrao Bhole; Lyrics: Narendra Sharma |
| Sarala | Premankur Atorthy | Rattanbai, Kumar, Pramila, Hafisji, Anant Marathe, Ahindra Chowdhary, Baba Vyas, Jamshedji, Jilloobai, Asooji | Social | Imperial Films. Music: Lyrics: |
| Shahu Chor | M. Udwadia | Navinchandra, Zohra Sehgal, Brijmala, Amritlal Nagar, Ram Marathe, Nurjahan, Amritlal Nagar | Action | Nav Bharat Movies. Music: Jangam; Lyrics: |
| Shahid-e-Mohabbat | Homi Bode, Chandra Singh | Sharif, Mumtaz, Kitchlu, Sharma | Social | Bombay Pics. Music: Pransukh Nayak; Lyrics: |
| Shan-E-Hind | R. S. Choudhary | Sulochana (Ruby Myers), D. Billimoria, Ghulam Mohammed, Jumuna, Asooji | Social | Imperial Film Company. Music: Annasaheb Mainkar; Lyrics: |
| Shaitan Ka Pash a.k.a. Kamala C.I.D. | Ezra Mir | Mazhar Khan, Jehanara Kajjan, Khalil, Mustafa, Peerjan | Social | Madan Theatres. Music: Hussain Khan; Lyrics: |
| Sher Ka Panja | Dwarka Khosla | Nazir, Sardar Akhtar, Firoze Dastur, Yasmin, Gope, Omkar, Ashalata, Kashmiri, Hari Shivdasani | Action | Eastern Arts. Music: Anil Biswas, Jhande Khan; Lyrics: Gauri Shankarlal Akhtar |
| Sher-E-Kabul | | | | Music: Lyrics: |
| Shokhe Dilruba | J. P. Advani | Yasmin, Khurshid, Nazir, Kamlakar, Sharifa, Saroj, Bibijan | | Variety Pictures. Music: Sunderdas Bhatia; Lyrics: Munshi Shyam |
| Sipah Silar | Mohammed Hussain | Abbas, Mustafa, Ghulam Hussain, Champaklal, Kawasji Panthaki | Action | Pioneer Films Company. Music: Lyrics: |
| Sipahi Ki Sajni | Chandulal Shah | E. Billimoria, Gohar Mamajiwala, Charlie, Dixit, Ghory, Keki Adjania, Rewashankar, Shanta, Bhupatrai, Kesari, Ram Apte, Ishwarlal | Romantic Drama | Ranjit Film Company. Music: : Banne Khan, Rewashankar; Lyrics: Narayan Prasad Betaab |
| Sita Haran | Kerewala? A. H. Essa? | Patience Cooper, Narmada Shankar, Mehazabin | Religious | Madan Theatres Ltd Music: Lyrics: |
| Snehlata | Balwant Bhatt | Rajkumari, Gulab, Jayant, Umakant, Shirin, Panna, Jai Writer, Lallubhai | Romantic tragedy | Prakash Pictures Music: Lallubhai Nayak; Lyrics: Pandit Anuj Also in Gujarati |
| Struggle a.k.a. Jeevan Sangram | Ezra Mir | Jahanara Kajjan, Ishwarlal, Ghulam Hussain, Mahajabeen, Mohammed Hussain, Akhtar Nawaz, Mustafa | Social | Madan Theatres Ltd. Music: Lyrics: |
| Sultana Chand Bibi | A. R. Kabuli | Sharifa, Shakuntala, Sadiq Ali, Kabuli, Kamlabai, Sher Ali, Fakir Mohammed, Haroon | Historical Legend | Ajit Movies. Music: Lyrics: |
| Sundari | Aspi Irani | Kamlesh Kumar, Lalita Devi, Laxmi, Rafique Ghaznavi, Sarojini, Boman Shroff, Saed Ahmed | Costume | Premier Films. Music: Lahnu Master; Lyrics: |
| Sunehra Sansar | Debaki Bose | Vijay Kumar, Mazhar Khan, Rampyari, Gul Hamid, Azurie, Nazir Bedi, Nand Kishore, Menka, Kamla Jharia, K. N. Singh | Comedy | East India Film Company. Music: K. C. Dey; Lyrics: Vijay Kumar |
| Tope Ka Gola | Balwant Bhatt | Jayant, Gulab, Shirin, Umakant, M. Zahur, Ismail, Basjir Qawwal, Lallubhai, Nurjahan, S. Nazir | Action | Prakash Pictures. Music: Lallubhai Nayak; Lyrics: Pandit Anuj |
| Zalzala | Sorabji Kerawala | Radha, S. Kerawala, Ebrahim, Agha Ali, Akbar Peshawari, D. Mehra, N. M. Khan, Sajid Hussain, A. Rauf, Champa, Anwaribai | Action | Star Films. Music: Mushtq Hussain, Chhailaram Solanki; Lyrics: |
| Zan Mureed | A. H. Essa | Sitara Devi, Kashinath, Sushila Devi, Sharifa, Aziz, Moti, Mayuri, Sadiq Ali, Amir Hussain | Costume | Taj Productions. Music: Shanti Kumar Desai; Lyrics: Mahir Kanpuri |
