= List of Hindi films of 1934 =

A list of films produced by the Bollywood film industry based in Mumbai in 1934:

== A ==
Title	Director	Cast	Genre	Notes
Aaj Kal	R. S. Choudhary	Ermeline, Jal Merchant, Shanta Kumari, Sundarabai, Hadi, Baba Vyas	Social	Gold Mohur Sound Pics. Music: S. P. Rane; Lyrics: Nashtar Lucknavi
Actress a.k.a. Bambai Ki Mohini	Balwant Bhatt	Harishchandra Rao, Alaknanda, Kashinath, Bachchu, Panna, Lallubhai	Social	Prakash Pictures. Music: Lallubhai Nayak; Lyrics: Pandit Anuj
Adil-E-Jehangir	K. Sardar	Zubeida, Miss Zohrajan, Padmavati Shaligram, Khatoon, Aziz, Kantilal, Nawab, Anwaribai, Pushpa	Historical Drama	United Artists. Music: Ishrat Sultana; Lyrics:
Afghan Abla	J. P. Advani	Master Chonkar, Sultana, Kamlabai, Ata Mohamed	Costume	Kumar Movies. Music: Lyrics:
Ajamil	A. R. Kabuli	Zebunissa, Sardar Akhtar, A. R. Kabuli, Ashraf Khan, Sultan Alam, Sher Ali, Jani Babu	Legend	Saroj Movietone. Music: Lyrics: A. R. Kabuli
Akashwani a.k.a. Prophecy	Bhalji Pendharkar	Master Vinayak, Leela, Meenakshi Shirodkar, Baburao Pendharkar, Nanasaheb Phatak, Master Vasant, Bhadre, Dr. Sathe	Costume	Kolhapur Cinetone. Music: Gundopant Walawalkar
Ambarish	V. M. Gunjal	Bandopant, Gulab, Sohani, Boradekar, Kamlabai, Bhagwandas	Devotional	Ambika Movietone. Music: K. Yagnik; Lyrics: Narayan Prasad Betab
Ameena	Akhtar Nawaz	Akhtari Bai, Mahajabin, Agha Jani, Zarina, Akhtar Nawaz	Social	Kali Films. Music: Lyrics:
Amirzadi	A. R. Kabul	Master Chonkar, Sultana, Ashraf Khan, Kamlabai, Majid, Rajkumari, A. R. Kabul	Costume	Kumar Movies. Music: Lyrics:
Amrit Manthan	V. Shantaram	Chandra Mohan, Nalini Tarkhud, Shanta Apte, Keshavrao Date, Sureshbabu Mane, Budhasaheb, Varde, Kulkarni	Costume	Prabhat Film Company. Music: Keshavrao Bhole; Lyrics: Veer Mohammedpuri
Anokha Prem	Faredoon Irani	Patience Cooper, Yusuf Effendi, Jehanara Kajjan, Rajkumari, Jagdish Sethi, Violet Cooper, Ghulam Hussain, Ghulam Mustafa, Lakshmi, Pearl, Parvati	Social	Madan Theatres Ltd. Music: Chhailaram Solanki; Lyrics: Dil Lukhnavi
Anokhi Mohabbat	Ramnik Desai	Kumar, Sitara Devi, Yakub, Kayam Ali, Hira Kumari, Razak, Tarabai, Pande	Costume Drama	Sagar Movietone Music: Balram Singh; Lyrics:

== B-C ==
Title	Director	Cast	Genre	Notes
Baag E Misar	JBH Wadia	Padma Devi, S. Nazir, Boman Shroff, Jamna, Jal Khambatta, Firoze Dastur, Sayani Atish, Master Mohammed, Munchi Thuthi, Minoo Cooper	Costume Action	Wadia Movietone. Music: Master Mohammed, Joseph David; Lyrics: Joseph David, Munshi Aashak
Baghdad Ka Chor	D. N. Madhok	Shiraz, Mumtaz, Ebrahim, Miss Moti, Meher-Ul-Nissa, Hanumant Rao, Mansur, Mansoor Ali, Vimal	Fantasy	Paramount Pictures. Music: Damodar Sharma; Lyrics: D. N. Madhok
Bala Joban	Baburao Patel	Mubarak, Padma Devi, Shrin Banu, M. Gupte, Badri Prasad, Gulab, Madhukar Gupte, Nandu Khote, Maruti Pahelwan, Raja Pandit, Ghulam Hussain, Master Kamlakar	Social	Gandharva Cinetone. Music: Badri Prasad; Lyrics:
Bhakta Ke Bhagwan	Gunjal	Raj Kumari, Ahindra Chowdhry, Devbala, Patience Cooper, Shahzadi, Dadabhai Sarkari, Damodar, Dhrupad, Shyam Sunder	Devotional	Bharat Lakshmi. Music: Nagar Das Nayak; Lyrics: Dhrupad Rai
Bhakta Prahlad	K. P. Bhave, R. G. Torney	Shakuntala, Mohan, Ratnaprabha, P. Varne, Salvi, Vasantrao Pehalwan, Krishnakant, Javdekar	Devotional	Saraswati Cinetone. Music: Annasaheb Mainkar; Lyrics:
Bhedi Rajkumar	R. G. Torney	Master Vithal, Menaka, Shakuntala, D. S. Salvi, Netra, Vasantrao Pahelwan, Javdekar, Varne	Costume	Saraswati Cinetone. Music: Annasaheb Mainkar; Lyrics:
Bulbule Paristan	Dhirubhai Desai	Udvadia, Gulab, Maruti Rao, Sushila, Sidheshwari, Bhim, Kantilal, Himmatlal	Fantasy	Vishnu Cinetone. Music: Kikubhai Yagnik; Lyrics: Munshi Zameer
Chalta Purza	R. N. Vaidya	Shiraz, Ebrahim, Moti, Hanumant Rao, Vimla Devi, Sardar Mansur	Social	Paramount. Music: Damodar Sharma; Lyrics:
Chandidas	Nitin Bose	K. L. Saigal, Uma Shashi, Pahari Sanyal, M. Ansari, Anwaribai, Nawab, Parvati, I. H. Sadiq, Siddiqui	Devotional Biopic	New Theatres. Music: R. C. Boral; Lyrics: Agha Hashr Kashmiri
Chandra Gupta	Abdul Rashid Kardar	Gul Hamid, Sabita Devi, Mazhar Khan, Dhiraj Bhattacharya, Nazir Ahmed, A. R. Pehalwan	Historical	East India Film Company. Music: K. C. Dey; Lyrics:
Chhapan Chhuri	Ramakant Ranganath	Jaiman, Janki, Prof. Bali, Manorama Sr.	Action	Ashok Cine. Music: Ram T. Heera, Prof. Basarkar; Lyrics: Surendra
Cinema Queen	Rajendra Raj Gaur	Mehtab, Mumtaz, Bachchu, Alaknanda, Madhukar Gupte Shivrani Ghosh, Sadiq, Narsi, Mangle, Nurjehan, Shukla	Action	Vasant Movietone. Music:

== D-G ==
Title	Director	Cast	Genre	Notes
Daku Mansoor	Nitin Bose	K. L. Saigal, Prithviraj Kapoor, Uma Shashi, Pahari Sanyal, Nemo, Husn Banu,	Costume Action	New Theatres. Music: R. C. Boral; Lyrics:
Daksha Yagna	Jyotish Bannerjee	Radharani, Ahindra Choudhary, Dhiraj Bhattacharya, Mrinal Ghosh, Nimbalkar, Tulsi Chakraborty, Kumar Mitra, Chandravati Devi		Music: Himanshu Datta, Haripad Roy; Lyrics: Manjur
Dard E Dil	M. Bhavnani, Moti Jhangiani	P. Jairaj, Lalita Devulkar, Tarabai, Khalil, Ameena, Bhudo Advani, Navin, Parashar, W. M. Khan, Nayampally, Abu Bakar, Gyani	Costume Drama	Ajanta Cinetone. Music: B. S. Hoogan; Lyrics: Khalil Aftab
Devaki	N. D. Sarpotdar	Sulochana (Ruby Myers), D. Billimoria, Dulari, Dattar, Raja Sandow, Jadhav, Devaskar, Lahnoo, Sarpotdar	Devotional	Imperial. Music: Pransukh Nayak; Lyrics:
Dhartikamp	Saki	Radharani, Sayani Atish, Roshanara Begum, Inamdar	Action	Laxmi Cine. Music: Mulraj Kapadia, M. Sagir; Lyrics:
Dilara	J. P. Advani	Sardar Akhtar, Zebunissa, Kamla, Ashraf Khan, J. Gidwani, Ebrahim, Sher Ali, Balabhai	Social	Hindustan Cinetone. Music: Rafiq; Lyrics: Munshi Rafiq
Diwani	D. N. Madhok	Sarojini, Moti, Dar Kashmiri (Jeevan), Mishra, R. Jani, Ratilal, Nurjehan, S. Shamsudin, Miss Pokhraj, Azurie		Kailash Sound Pics. Music: H. C. Bali; Lyrics: D. N. Madhok
Dolti Nayya	Drupad Roy	B. Sohani, Sundri, Bhagwandas, Narenbabu, Meera	Social	Ambika Movietone. Music: Kikibhai Yagnik, Amulya Charan Biswas; Lyrics:
Dukhtar-e-Hind	A. P. Kapoor	Master Nissar, Ameena, W. M. Khan, Bibbo, Bhudo Advani, Tarabai, Navin, Shahzadi,	Costume	Ajanta Cinetone. Music: Zhande Khan, B. S. Hoogan; Lyrics: A. P. Kapoor
Fida E Tohid a.k.a. Fida-E-Tauheen		Shamsuddin, Jahangir, Mahendra Singh, Nizam, Ranibala, Kamla, A. Shah, Miss Zohrajan, Mohammed Ismail, Kamrunnisa	Costume	Shankar Movietone
Flashing Sword a.k.a. Chamakti Shamsheer	Ahmed H. Essa	Kanta Kumari, Master Chonkar, Lovji Lavangia, A. Hamid, S. Usman, Manish	Action	Capital Sound Pictures. Music: Lyrics: Munshi Zameer
Gafil Musafir	J. P. Advani	Sardar Akhtar, Ashraf Khan, Ghulam Mohammed, Irshad Ali, Prabha Shankar, Sultan Ahmed, Balabhai		Music: Sunderdas Bhatia; Lyrics: Munshi Rafiq
Garib Ki Duniya	Sorabji Kerawala	Jehanara Kajjan, Patience Cooper, S. Kerawala, Sharifa, Mohammed Hussain, Lakshmi	Social	Music: Chhailaram Solanki, Nagardas Nayak; Lyrics:
Grihalaxmi	Sarvottam Badami	Yakub, Jal Merchant, Sabita Devi, K. C. Dey, SWaroop Rani, Lalita Devulkar, Asooji, Mehboob Khan, Kamla	Socil Family	Sagar Movietone. Music: S. P. Rane; Lyrics:
Gul Sanobar	Homi Master	Sulochana Ruby Myers, D. Billimoria, Zubeida, Ghulam Mohammed, Chanda, Hadi, Jilloobai, Abdul Qadir, Sayed Ahmed	Fantasy	Imperial Film Company. Music: Pransukh Naik; Lyrics: Munshi Zameer
Gunsundari	Chandulal Shah	E. Billimoria, Gohar Mamajiwala, Rampyari, Shanta, Dixit, Keki Adajania, Ghory, Ram Apte, Raja Sandow	Social	Ranjit Film Company. Music: Rewashankar, Gyanprasad Pathak; Lyrics:

== H-K ==
Title	Director	Cast	Genre	Notes
Haman	S. Kerawala	Mahajabin, Mehmud Din, Sushila, S. Kerawala, C. Panthaki, Abbas		Madan Theatres Ltd. Music: Nagardas Nayak; Lyrics:
Hari Bhakti	Prafulla Ghosh	Kanan Devi, Mrinal Ghosh, Avdhut, Tulsicharan, Benoy, Goswami	Devotional	Radha Film Company. Music: R. C. Bhattacharya; Lyrics:
Hoor-E-Baghdad	R. N. Vaidya	Shiraz, Sardar Mansur, Meherunisa, Anwaribai, Swarup Rani, Vimla, Bachcha, Dalpat	Fantasy	Paramount Film Co. Music: Damodar Sharma; Lyrics: Munshi Nazan
Hothal Padmini	K. Rathod	Sardar Akhtar, Zebunissa, Iqbal, Ashraf Khan, Ali Baksh	Legend	Saroj Movies. Music: Sunderdas; Lyrics:
Indira M. A.	Nandlal Jaswantal	Sulochana (Ruby Myers), D. Billimoria, Jamshedji Khansaheb, Raja Sandow, Jilloobai, Hadi	Social	Imperial. Music: Pransukh Nayak; Lyrics: Dhaniram Prem
Insaaf Ki Tope	Vithaldas Panchotia	Rajkumari, V. Panchotia, Dadabhai Sarkari, Shahzadi, R. P. Kapoor, Shaila, Fida Hussain, Bhola Shankar	Action	Bharat Lakshmi Pictures. Music: Nagardas Nayak; Lyrics:
Jaan Nissar	K. Rathod	Sardar Akhtar, Sultan Alam, Maruti Rao, Zebunissa, Jani Babu		Sarla Cinetone. Music: Lyrics:
Jawani Diwani	Shanti Dave	Ranibala, Zohrajan, Panna, Shivrani Ghosh, Manohar Ghatwai, Rafiqe Ghaznavi	Social	Jayant Pics Music: Rafiqe Ghaznavi; Lyrics: Munshi Jilani Shyam
Johar-E-Shamsheer	J. P. Advani	Nissar, Zebunissa, Sardar Akhtar, Prabha Shankar, Jani Babu, Bibijan	Costume Action	Saroj Movietone. Music: Lyrics:
Kala Gulab	JBH Wadia	Sharifa, Sarda Mansur, Husn Banu, Sayani Atish, Firoze Dastur, Gulshan, Jal Khambatta, Jaidev, Master Mohammed, Jamna		Wadia Movietone. Music: Master Mohammed; Lyrics: Joseph David
Kala Naag	Adi Irani, B. Murzban	Jamshedji Khansaheb, Dulari, Manjiri, Rafiq Ghaznavi, Tahami Chemist	Social	Majestic. Music: Lyrics: Nashtar Lakhnavi
Kala Wagh a.k.a. Black Tiger	Nagendra Majumdar	Mohini, Malti, Madhav Kale, Master Chonkar, Gohar Karnataki, Navinchandra, Nurjahan, Amritlal Nagar, Bhim	Costume	Jaydevi Cine. Music: Lyrics: Dhaniram Prem
Kanya Vikraya a.k.a. Lobhi Baap	Mohammed Hussain	Patience Cooper, Mohammed Hussain, Miss Rose, Master Mohan, Angurbala, Sharifa, Surajram	Social	Pioneer Films Company. Music: Master Motilal; Lyrics: Nashtar Lucknavi
Kashmeera	Nandlal Jaswantal	E. Billimoria, Madhuri, Raja Sandow, Shanta Kumari, Keki Adjania, Dixit, Ghory, Rewashankar,	Social	Ranjit Studios. Music: Rewashankar; Lyrics: Munshi Gulzar
Khak Ka Putla	G. R. Sethi	Gulab, Alaknanda, Mohammed Hussain, Sunder Rao, Hirabai, Zahiruddin, Bhai Desa, Haridas	Costume	Krishna. Music: Master Mohammed; Lyrics: Zahiruddin
Kismet Ka Shikar	Mohammed Hussain	Patience Cooper, Mohammed Hussain, Miss Rose, Master Mohan, Angurbala, Pramod Kumar, Sharifa, Surajram, Lakshmi, Violet Cooper, Manilal	Social	Pioneer Films Company. Music: Nayakdas Nayak; Lyrics: Master Mohan
Kismet Ki Kasauti	Pesi Karani	Khalil, K. C. Dey, Miss Iqbal, Nand Kishore, Athar, Reggie Benson, Padmavati Shaligram, Bachcha, Noorjahan	Costume Drama	East India Film Company. Music: K. C. Dey; Lyrics:
Krishna Arjun Yudh	Vishram Bedekar, Chintamanrao Kolhatkar, Vamanrao Bhatt	Dinanath, Nalini Nagpurkar, Damuanna Malvankar, Nirmala Devi, Sushila Devi, B Gokhale, S Bhosle, G Mohite	Religious	Balwant Pics. Music: Lyrics:

== M-N ==
Title	Director	Cast	Genre	Notes
Magic Flute a.k.a. Khwabe Hasti	Homi Master	D. Billimoria, Gohar Mamajiwala, Sulochana (Ruby Myers), Chanda, Rustom Irani, Hadi, W. M. Khan, Ghory, B. Sansare	Fantasy	Imperial Film Company. Music: Nashtar Lakhnavi; Lyrics:
Maharani	Baburao Patel	Mubarak, Padma Devi, Shirin Banu, N. Chhapekar, Surve, Raja Pandit		Gandharva Cinetone. Music: N. Chhapekar; Lyrics: Pandit Indra
Manjari	M. Gidwani	Ghulam Rasool, Mushtari, G. Tembe, Syed Ahmed, Master Andaz	Social	Shree Cine Music: Govindrao Tembe; Lyrics:
Mast Fakir	D. N. Madhok	Shiraz, Sushila, Ebrahim, Miss Moti, Meher-Ul-Nissa, Hanumant Rao, Sardar Mansur, Bimla, Gulshan	Social	Kumar Movies. Music: Damodar Sharma; Lyrics: D. N. Madhok
Matsya Gandha	Dakubhai Mehta	Inamdar, Shahzadi, Madhav Kale, Malti, Maruti Rao, Baburao Savare, Tara Devi	Mythology	New Era Pics. Music: Madhulal Damodar Master; Lyrics:
Mazdoor a.k.a. The Mill	M. D. Bhavnani	P. Jairaj, Bibbo, Navin Yagnik, Ameena, Tarabai, Khalil, S. L. Puri, Bhudo Advani, Nayampally, Abu Bakar	Social	The first film to be banned by the British Government. Re-issued as Ghar Parwar in 1936. Ajanta Cinetone. Music: B. S. Hoogan; Lyrics: Mirabai, Traditional
Mera Iman	N. Majumdar	Gohar Karnataki, Athavale, Amirjan, Madhav Kale, Madhukar Gupte	Costume	Jaydevi Cine. Music: Dhaniram Prem; Lyrics:
Mumtaz Begum	Akhtar Nawaz	Gul Hamid, Mazhar Khan, Akhtari Bai, Anwaribai, Bachchu, Athar, A. R. Pahelwan	Historical	East India Film Company Music: Motilal Nayak; Lyrics:
Naachwali	Ramnik Desai	Yakub, Swaroop Rani, Jaddanbai, Rafiq Ghaznavi, Kayam Ali, Pesi Patel, Misra, Mehboob Khan	Social	Sagar Movietone. Music: Balram Singh; Lyrics: Munshi Aziz
Nadira	Jayant Desai	E. Billimoria, Madhuri, Ishwarlal, Rampyari, Charlie, Keki Adjania, Dixit, Ghory, Khatoon, Bhupatrai, Azurie,		Ranjit Film Company. Music: Gangaprasad Pathak, Banne Khan; Lyrics: Narayan Prasad Betab
Nagan	Jyotish Bandyopadhyay	Nimbalkar, Radha, Ghulam Rasool Anwari, Chandu	Fantasy	Radha Film Company. Music: Lyrics: Nashtar Lucknavi; Lyrics:
Nai Duniya	Balwant Bhatt	Rajkumari, Kashinath, Panna, Umakant, Lallubhai, Dulari	Social	Prakash Pictures. Music: Lallubhai Nayak; Lyrics: Pandit Anuj
Nanand Bhojai	Nanubhai Vakil	Zubeida, Yusuf, Bhai Desa, Ameena, Ratilal, Gulab, Laxmi, Pawar, Shahzadi, Dinkar	Social	Mahalaxmi Cinetone. Music: Dinkar S. Bidkar; Lyrics:
Nand Ke Lala	Nanubhai Vakil	Zubeida, Shahu Modak, Dinkar, Gulab	Devotional	Mahalaxmi Cinetone. Music: Dinkar S. Bidkar; Lyrics: Lahnu Master
Nav Bharat	Chunilal Parekh	Navinchandra, Shivrani Ghosh, Qamar, Bachchu, Alaknanda	Action	Victory Pictures. Music: Shanti Kumar Desai; Lyrics: Munshi Jilani Shyam
Neki Ka Taj	N. G. Devare	Ebrahim, Fatma Begum, Allavally, Prof. Lele, Noorjahan	Costume	Digveer Cinetone. Music: Lyrics:
Night Bird a.k.a. Raat Ka Raja	Dhirendranath Gangopadhyay	Gul Hamid, Indubala, Mazhar Khan, Nazir, Bhumen Roy, Anwaribai	Social	East India Film Company. Music: Lyrics:
Noor Mahal	Moti B. Gidwani	Shankar Rao, Miss Iqbal, Misra, Ratilal, Yakbal, Dulari, Z. Khan, Azurie, Harbanslal Kohli	Costume	Manhar Movies. Music: Dilipchand Vedi; Lyrics: Dilipchand Vedi, C. P. Varma
Noor-E-Islam	Mubarak	Roshanara Begum, Mubarak, Swarup Rani	Costume	Trilok Cinetone. Music: Lyrics:

== P-R ==
Title	Director	Cast	Genre	Notes
Parth Kumar	Bhalji Pendharkar	Krishna Bai, Sohoni, Raja Sandow, Shalini, Vasant, Shakuntala, Mane	Mythology	Shyam Cinetone. Music: Gundopant Walwalkar; Lyrics:
Phantom Of The Hills a.k.a. Farzande Hind		Sabita Devi, Yakub, Jal Merchant, Panna, Charlie, Nayampally, Asooji	Costume Action	Sagar Movietone. Music: S. P. Rane; Lyrics:
Piya Pyare	R. S. Choudhry	D. Billimoria, Sulochana (Ruby Myers), Jamshedji, Rafiq Ghaznavi, Ghulam Mohammed, Hadi, Khansaheb, Jilloobai, Syed Ahmed, Rustom Poonawala	Social	Music: Pransukh Naik; Lyrics:
Prem Pariksha	G. R. Sethi	Rajkumari, Jaddanbai, Jagasia, S. Baburao, Vazirjan, Hari Shivdasani, Gope, Ghulam Haider, D. Manek	Social	Eastern Art. Music: Chandiram; Lyrics: Gauri Shankarlal Akhtar
Ramayan	Prafulla Roy, Sudarshan	Prithviraj Kapoor, Rajkumari, Vithaldas Panchotia, Indubala, Devbala, R. P. Kapoor, Shahzadi, Fida Hussain, Dadabhai Sarkari, Kabuli, Rajlakshmi, Bholashankar	Religious	Bharat Lakshmi Pictures. Music: Nagar Das Nayak; Lyrics: Pandit Sudarshan
Ranchandi	Babubhai Jani	Navinchandra, Mehtab, Shivrani Ghosh, Haridas, Ranibala, Lovji Lavangia	Costume	Jayant Pics Music: Madhulal Damodar Master; Lyrics:
Rashk-E-Laila	Nanubhai Vakil	Zubeida, Bhai Desa, Yusuf, Pawar, Dinkar Bidkar, Joshi, Hiroji, Master Gulab	Costume	Mahalaxmi Cinetone. Music: Dinkar S. Bidkar; Lyrics:
Roop Kumari	J. J. Madan	Master Mohan, Akhtari Bai, Laxmi, Rose	Costume	Madan Theatres Ltd. Music: Brij Lal Verma; Lyrics:
Rooplekha	P.C. Barua	K. L. Saigal, Rattan Bai, Pahari Sanyal, Jamuna, Charlie	Historical Drama	New Theatres. Music: R. C. Boral; Lyrics: Bani Kumar
Rukmani Haran	Madan Rai Vakil	D. Billimoria, Mushtari, Lahnoo Master, Devaskar, Jilloobai	Legend	Imperial. Music: Pransukh Nayak; Lyrics: Nashtar Lakhnavi

== S ==
Title	Director	Cast	Genre	Notes
Sair-E-Paristan	M. D. Bhavnani	Bibbo, Master Nissar, P. Jairaj, Ameena, Bhudo Advani, Khalil, Parashar, W. M. Khan, Nayampally, Tarabai	Fantasy	Ajanta Cinetone. Music: B. S. Hoogan; Lyrics:
Sakhi Lutera	S. Kerawala	Jehanara Kajjan, Patience Cooper, Yusuf Effendi, C. Panthaki, S. Kerawala, A. R. Kabul, Fakhruddin, Mustafa	Costume Action	Music: Brijlal Varma; Lyrics: Munshi Nazan
Samaj Ki Bhool	Homi Master	Inayat, Abdul Qadir, Dulari, Lalita Pawar, Rafiq Ghaznavi, Jamshedji, Khansaheb	Social	Imperial Films. Music: Pransukh Nayak; Lyrics: Munshi Zameer
SantTulsidas	N. G. Devare	Fatma Begum, G. N. Joshi, Shanta Kumari, Raja Babu, Usha, Allavally, Madhav, Jamna, Dattaraya, Jijibhai	Biopic Devotional	Digveer Cinetone. Music: R. Ramnathkar, Suresh Babu Mane; Lyrics:
Sati Anjani	Kanjibhai Rathod	Kamla, Panna, S. Baburao, Miss Gulzar, Mehboob Khan, Asooji, Anees Khatoon, B. Sansare	Devotional	Sagar Movietone Music: S. P. Rane; Lyrics:
Saubhagya Laxmi	V. M. Vyas	Sultana, Majid, Kamlabai, Rajkumari, Master Chonkar, Ata Mohamed	Social	Kumar Movies.
Seeta	Debaki Bose	Gul Hamid, Prithviraj Kapoor, Durga Khote, Trilok Kapoor, Indubala, Mazhar Khan, Govindrao Tembe, K. C. Dey, Radhabai, Dhiraj Bhattacharya, Mukhtar Begum, Hiralal	Religious	East India Film Company. Music: K. C. Dey; Lyrics: Narottam Vyas
Seva Sadan	Nanubhai Vakil	Shahu Modak, Zubeida, Pawar, Jaddanbai, Fatma Begum, Joshi, Shirin, Gulab, Dinkar	Social	Mahalaxmi Cinetone. Music: Dinkar Bidkar; Lyrics: Munshi Premchand
Shah-E-Iran	G. R. Sethi	Meera Devi, Maruti Rao, Chhapekar, Inamdar, Pathare, Noor Mohammedd, Kulkarni, Vijaya	Costume	Central Movietone. Music: Sagir; Lyrics: Kabil Amritsari
Shehar Ka Jadoo	K. P. Ghosh	Motilal, Kumar, Sabita Devi, Sitara Devi, Tarabai, Miss Gulzar, K. C. Dey, Kamlabai, Pande	Social	First Film of Motilal. Sagar Movietone. Music: K. C. Dey; Lyrics:
Shahi Lakkadhara	Chunilal Parekh, T. N. Joshi	Maruti Rao, Tara, Zohrajan, Azmat, Lovji Lavangia, Baburao, Kashinath	Costume	Jayant Pics. Music: Dilipchand Vedi; Lyrics: Munshi Jilani Shyam
Sinhasan	Gajanan Jagirdar	Shanta Kumari, A. Majumdar, Indumati, Nandu Khote, Bimla Kumari, Raja Babu, Vasudev, Surve, Anand	Costume	Himalaya Pics. Music: A. Mujumdar, A. Bhaskar Rao; Lyrics: Pandit Shiv Kumar
Sitamgar	Jayant Desai	E. Billimoria, Madhuri, Ishwarlal, Shanta Charlie, Dixit, Ghory, Khatoon, Ram Apte, Bhupatrai, Keki Adjania, Tarabai	Costume	Ranjit Studios. Music: Bannekhan, Rewashankar; Lyrics: Narayan Prasad Betab
Sone Ki Chidiya	G. R. Sethi	Himmatlal, Pushpa, Y. Dave, Haridas, S. Baburao, Madhavlal Damodar		Krishna Movies Music: Madhavlal Damodar Master
Sultana	Abdul Rashid Kardar	Gul Hamid, Mazhar Khan, Zarina, Indubala, Nazir, Shivratan Joshi, Teela Mohammed, Lala, Hussain, Nawab, Mushtaq Hussain		East India Film Company. Music: Mushtaq Hussain; Lyrics:
Suvarna Mandir	M. R. Rangnekar	Ganpatrao Bodas, Jyotsna Bhole, Baburao Manerikar, Hirabai Barodekar, Nanasaheb Hardikar, Balwantrao Parchure		Menaka Pics. Music: Ramnathkar; Lyrics: Pandit Anand Kumar

== T-Z ==
Title	Director	Cast	Genre	Notes
Talismi Talwar	J. P. Advani	Sardar Akhtar, Gulab, Zebunissa, Ashraf Khan, Balabhai, A. R. Kabul		Saroj Movietone. Music: Munshi Rafiq; Lyrics: Munshi Rafiq
Tara Sundari	Chandulal Shah	E. Billimoria, Gohar Mamajiwala, Ishwarlal, Kamla, Keki Adjania, Bhupatrai, Thatte, Ghory, Bhagwandas	Costume	Ranjit Film Company. Music: Zhande Khan, Ganga Prasad Pathak; Lyrics: Narayan Prasad Betab
Thief of Iraq	Kanjibhai Rathod, Asooji	Navinchandra, Zohrajan, Hirabai, Tarabai, S. Nazir, Zahiruddin, Fakir Mohammed	Action	Jawahar Movies. Music: Ghulam Haider; Lyrics: Zahiruddin
Toofan Mail	Jayant Desai	E. Billimoria, Madhuri, Ishwarlal, Rampyari, Charlie, Keki Adjania, Dixit, Ghory, Khatoon, Bhupatrai, Azurie, Ram Apte, Kesari, Rewashankar	Action	Ranjit Film Company. Music: Rewashankar; Lyrics:
Toofani Taruni	Chandulal Shah	E. Billimoria, Gohar Mamajiwala, Ishwarlal, Rampyari, Charlie, Keki Adjania, Dixit, Ghory, Khatoon, Bhupatrai, Azurie, Ram Apte, Kesari, Rewashankar, Shanta	Action	Ranjit Film Company. Music: Bannekhan, Rewashankar; Lyrics: Nrayan Prasad Betab
Vaman Avtar	JBH Wadia	Firoze Dastur, Jamuna, Jal Khambatta, Nurjehan, Master Mohammed, Jaidev	Mythology	Wadia Movietone. First film of Jaidev as Narad Muni. Music: Joseph David; Lyrics: Joseph David
Vasantsena	J. P. Advani	Zohrajan, Shanker Rao, Sitara Devi, Gulab, Sunder Rao, Tarabai, Kashinath, Manohar, Ghanshyam, Bhagwandas		Vasant Movietone. Music: Madhavlal Damodar Master
Vasavdatta	P. Y. Altekar	P. Jairaj, Bibbo, Padmavati Shaligram, Tarabai, B. Sohani, Bhudo Advani, W. M. Khan, Nayampally, Parashar, Shahzadi	Historical Drama	Ajanta Cinetone. Music: B. S. Hoogan; Lyrics: Seemab
Veer Babruvahan	Jayant Desai	E. Billimoria, Madhuri, Ishwarlal, Rampyari, Khatoon, Dixit, Ghory, Keki Adjania, Bhagwandas, Shanta, Tarabai	Mythology	Ranjit Studios. Music: Zandekhan, Gangaprasad Pathak; Lyrics:
Veer Bharat	Homi Wadia	Boman Shroff, Gulshan, Sayani Atish, Jaidev Minoo Cooper, Manchi Thuthi, Master Mohammed, Nurjahan, S. Nazir	Costume Action	Wadia Movietone. Music: Master Mohammed; Lyrics: Joseph David
Veer Pujan	G. R. Sethi	Navinchandra, Mehtab, Trikamlal, Bachchu, Alaknanda, Shivrani Ghosh, Haridas	Costume	Jayant Pics. Music: Dilipchand Vedi; Lyrics:
Veerangana Panna	H. S. Mehta	Gulab, Umakant, Baburao Apte, Pushpa, Amritlal Nagar, Bhim, Shivrani Ghosh	Devotional	Sharda Movietone. Music: Lyrics: Dhaniram Prem
Vehmi Duniya	Anant Desai	Shirin, B. Sohani, Rambai Rao, Vatsala Joshi	Social	Jagannath Cine. Music: Lyrics: Nashtar Lucknavi
Vishu Bhakti	G. R. Sethi	Shyama Zutshi, Maruti Rao, Madhav Kale, Bachchu, Amirbai Karnataki	Devotional	Oriental Company. Music: Badri Prasad; Lyrics:
Watan Parasta	D. N. Madhok	Roshanara Begum, Miss Moti, Rajkumari, Sardar Mansur, Hanumant Rao, Esmail, Dar Kashmiri (Jeevan), Prof. Ramanand Sharma	Costume	Music: H. C. Bali; Lyrics:
