= Baghi =

Baghi may refer to:

== Films ==
- Baghi (1939 film), see List of Hindi films of 1939
- Baghi (1953 film), see List of Hindi films of 1953
- Baghi (1956 film), a Pakistani Urdu-language film
- Baghi (1964 film), a 1964 Bollywood film with Leela Naidu
- Baghi (2005 film), a 2005 film with Sardool Sikander

== Other uses ==
- Baghi, Iran, a village in North Khorasan Province, Iran
- Baghi, Razavi Khorasan, a village in Razavi Khorasan Province, Iran
- Emadeddin Baghi (born 1962), Iranian rights activist and investigative journalist
- Baghi (Islam), transgression and infringement on the rights of others, rebellion, or armed uprising against a legitimate Imam or Islamic ruler.

== See also ==
- Baghi Sipahi (disambiguation)
- Baaghi (disambiguation)
- Bagi (disambiguation)
