= Chandragupta (film) =

- Directed by: A. R. Kardar
- Produced by: East India Film Company
- Starring: Nazir; Gul Hamid; Sabita Devi; Mazhar Khan; Dhiraj Bhattacharya
- Music by: K. C. Dey
- Production company: East India Film Company
- Release date: 1934
- Country: India
- Language: Hindi

Chandragupta is a 1934 Indian Hindi-language historical film directed by A. R. Kardar. Produced by East India Film Company, the music direction was by K. C. Dey. Kardar had moved to Calcutta where he joined the East India Film Company, and directed movies like Chandragupta. The film starred Nazir as Chandragupta. The cast included Gul Hamid, Sabita Devi, Mazhar Khan, Dhiraj Bhattacharya, and Vasantrao Pehalwan.

The story, historical, involves the founder of the Mauryan Empire, Chandragupta Maurya, and his advisor and prime minister Chanakya. The film had commercial success at the box office and proclaimed Kardar as a "talented film-maker".

== Cast ==
- Nazir as Chandragupta Maurya
- Gul Hamid
- Sabita Devi
- Mazhar Khan
- Dhiraj Bhattacharya
- Vasantrao Pehalwan

== Soundtrack ==
The music director is K. C. Dey.

=== Songlist ===
#	Title
1	"Basa Le Apne Man Mein Preet"
2	"Keh Raha Hai Aasman Yeh Sab Sama Kuchh Bhi Nahin"
3	"Lat Uljhi Suljha Ja Balam"
4	"Maadho Ne Bajai Kaisi Bansuri"
5	"Prem Ke Bas Mein Hai Sansar"
6	"Piya Ke Darshan Bin Mor Ab Nahin Pawat Sukh Nain"
7	"Teenon Lok Mein Chha Rahi Mahima Aprampar"
