= Akela (film) =

- Directed by: Pessi Karani
- Produced by: K. B. Desai Productions
- Starring: Bibbo; Mazhar Khan; E. Billimoria; Pratima Devi
- Music by: Khan Mastana
- Production company: Great India Pictures
- Release date: 1941
- Country: India
- Language: Hindi

Akela is a Bollywood social film released in 1941. It was produced by K. B. Desai Productions under the banner of Great India Pictures and directed by Pessi Karani. The film starred Bibbo, Mazhar Khan, E. Billimoria, Miss Moti, Pratima Devi, Bose, and Mohammed Hadi. Its music was composed by Khan Mastana and the lyrics were written by Pyare Lal Santoshi.

== Cast ==
- Mazhar Khan
- Bibbo
- E. Bilimoria
- Moti
- Bose
- Hadi
- Pratima Devi
