= Baghban (1938 film) =

1938 film

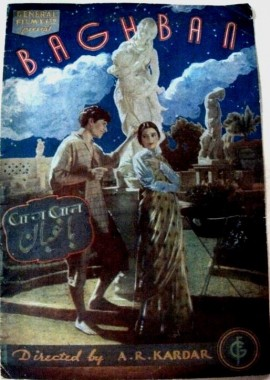
- Film poster
- Directed by: Abdul Rashid Kardar
- Written by: Begum Ansari
- Produced by: General Films Ltd.
- Starring: Nandrekar; Bimla Kumari; Nazir; Sitara Devi; K. N. Singh
- Cinematography: P. G. Kukde
- Music by: Mushtaq Hussain
- Production company: General Films Ltd.
- Release date: 16 July 1938
- Country: India
- Language: Hindi-Urdu

Baghban (transl. Gardener) is a 1938 Indian romantic drama film directed by A. R. Kardar.

Kardar also wrote the screenplay based on a story by Begum Ansari. The film's music was composed by Mushtaq Hussain with lyrics by Mirza Shauq.

Baghban was the first film directed by Kardar following his return to Bombay after directing films for East India Company in Calcutta. It became a big box-office success for him. According to Rajadhyaksha and Willemen, Kardar's interest with the topic of "sexually deviant behaviour" and violence in the garb of "reformism", a theme which he would later also use in Pagal (1940) and Pooja (1940), is present in Baghban.

The film involved a love story with a mystery. The naive Saroop falls in love with the jail warden's daughter who is to marry someone else. He then finds out that she's his child-bride from the past.

== Plot ==
Saroop (Nandrekar) is an innocent young man who gets lost in romantic thoughts when he hears a sadhu singing a love-song (prayer) to God. The holy man asks him to attend the Janamasthami fair. Through circumstances beyond his control, he gets arrested for loitering and is put in jail. He is made to work in the garden area of the warden's house, where he meets Durga (Bimla Kumari), the warden's daughter. A prison riot occurs and Saroop is injured. He is brought into the house by Durga and her friend Shanta (Sitara Devi). The attending doctor is Shanta's father, Doctor Hansraj. Saroop is freed from jail, and over several meetings, Durga and Saroop fall in love. However, Durga's marriage gets arranged with Ranjit (K. N. Singh) and Saroop is helpless. Ranjit has spurned his old flame Kammo (Yasmin), who is angry at the rebuff. Durga had been married off as a child, but it is believed that her boy-groom is dead. Ranjit has spread stories of her being a child-widow, in order to be the only one willing enough to marry her. On the day of the marriage, Kammo shoots Ranjit, and the Sadhu informs Dr. Hansraj that Saroop is his long-lost son who was married to Durga. Finally, Durga and Saroop get together again.

== Cast ==
- Bimala Kumari as Durga
- B. Nandrekar as Saroop
- Sitara Devi as Shanta
- Nazir
- K. N. Singh as Ranjit
- Yasmin as Kammo
- Putlibai
- Ashraf Khan as the sadhu (holy man)
- Ram Avtar
- Lala Yakub
- Wasti
- Mirza Mushraff

== Reception ==
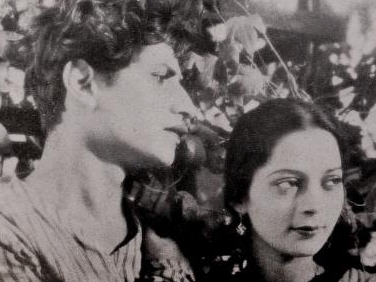
Nandrekar and Bimla Kumari, screen shot in Filmindia 1938

Baburao Patel, editor of the cine-magazine Filmindia, termed Bimla Kumari's acting as "staginess". Nandrekar was stated to be "useless", while Nazir's acting was cited as "unnatural and affected". K. N. Singh and Sitara Devi were the only two actors praised for their performances, with a special commendation for Singh that he would make a "good character actor". The direction for this "weak story" was called "unimaginative and unintelligent" but better than Kardar's earlier film Milap. K. N. Singh made a big name after his role in this film, he was praised by Ghosh for playing it with "remarkable assurance".

Baghban was a "tremendous success" at the box-office.

== Controversy ==
The film ran into a controversy, described as "A storm in the tea cup" by Baburao Patel. Nandrekar, who had acted in Amar Jyoti (1936) and was contracted to Prabhat Film Company for three years. He had not obtained permission from Prabhat to work in General Films Ltd.'s Baghban. The matter reached the High Court of Bombay on 14 July 1938 for an injunction to be passed to prevent the release of the film on 16 July 1938 at the Imperial Cinema. However, after three days of hearing the arguments the Honourable Justice Engineer, threw out the injunction and dismissed the motion.

== Soundtrack ==
Nine of the movie's songs were written and performed by Mirza Musharraf and the rest by Mushtaq Hussein with lyrics by Mirza Shauq and Mirza Musharraf, Hafiz Jalandhari. The singers were Sitara Devi, Ashraf Khan, Vimla, Sharda Pandit.

=== Songlist ===
#	Title	Singer
1	"Ro Ro Nain Ganwaaun"	Ashraf Khan
2	"Basa Le Apne Man Mein"	Ashraf Khan
3	"Aao Aan Baso Hriday Mein"	
4	"Aao Ral Mil Ke Jhoolein"	Sitara Devi
5	"Dildar Tumhi Ghamkhatar"	
6	"Haan Haan Zara Dheere Se Chakiye Chalaana"	
7	"Hori Khelo Hori Khelo Re Shyam"	Sitara Devi, Vimla
8	"Prem Jhutha Prem Jag Jhutha"	Ashraf Khan
9	"Sawan Beeta Jaaye Preetam"	
10	"Tadpat Hai Man"	Sharda Pandit
11	"Tssavur Mein Zulfon Ki Roya Kiya"	
