= Sultana (film) =

1934 film

- Directed by: A. R. Kardar
- Produced by: East India Film Company
- Starring: Gul Hamid; Zarina; Mazhar Khan; Indubala; Nazir
- Music by: Mushtaq Ahmed
- Production company: East India Film Company
- Release date: 1934
- Country: India
- Languages: Hindi; Punjabi

Sultana is a 1934 Indian Hindi-language film directed by A. R. Kardar.

The film was produced under the East India Film Company banner.

The music director was Mushtaq Ahmed, who also played a small role in the film. The lyrics were written by Munshi Aziz.

== Cast ==
- Gul Hamid
- Zarina
- Mazhar Khan
- Nazir
- Indubala
- Vasantrao Pahelwan
- Nawab
- Lala Yaqoob
- Fida Hussain
- Athar
- Ali

== Soundtrack ==
Akbar Khan Peshawri sang two of the popular songs from the film, "Kitab-e-Dard Mein Likha Mere Gam Ka Fasana Hai" and "Mushkil Kusha Hai Naam Tera". The music composer was Mushtaq Ahmed.

=== Songlist ===
#	Title
1	"Kitab-e-Dard Mein Likha Mere Gam Ka Fasana Hai"
2	"Haaye Haye Daiya Payal Mori Baaje"
3	"Mushkil Kusha Hai Naam Tera"
4	"Rang Badla Yaar Ka Pyar Ki Baatin Gayin"
5	"Pilu Pakiyan Ve Jeeva Aa Chann Ral Yaar"
6	"Tera Ashiq Meri Jaan Us Ghadi Maqlat Mein Aaya"
7	"Thodi Si Reh Gayi Hai Ise Bhi Guzar De"
8	"Unse Milne Ko Bhi Yaarab Koi Tadbeer Nahin"
9	"Main Tere Qurbaan"
10	"Koyalia Kaahe Karat Pukar Kalejwa Mein Maari Katar"
11	"Kya Tumne Dil Liya Nahin Jawab Do"
