= Baghi Sipahi =

Baghi Sipahi (lit. 'Rebel Soldier' in Hindi and Urdu) may refer to:

- Baghi Sipahi (1936 film), an Indian Hindi-Urdu film by Abdur Rashid Kardar starring Lalita Pawar
- Baghi Sipahi (1958 film), an Indian Hindi-language action drama film by Bhagwan Das Varma, starring Ranjan and Madhubala
- Baghi Sipahi (1986 film), a Pakistani film

== See also ==
- Baghi (disambiguation)
- Sipahi (disambiguation)
