= Bharosa (1940 film) =

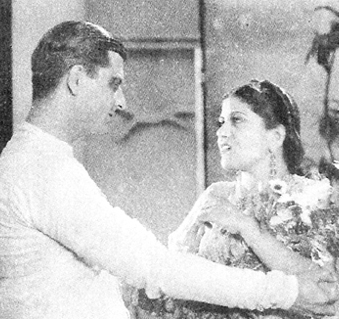
- Chandra Mohan and Sardar Akhtar in Bharosa (1940)
- Directed by: Sohrab Modi
- Written by: Lalchand Bismil
- Produced by: Sohrab Modi
- Starring: Chandra Mohan; Sardar Akhtar; Mazhar Khan; Sheela
- Cinematography: Y. D. Sarpotdar
- Music by: G. P. Kapoor
- Production company: Minerva Movietone
- Release date: 15 August 1940
- Running time: 147 minutes
- Country: India
- Language: Hindi

Bharosa (Trust) is a 1940 Hindi/Urdu social melodrama film produced and directed by Sohrab Modi. Made under the Minerva Movietone banner, the story and lyrics were by Lalchand Bismil, with cinematography by Y. D. Sarpotdar. The music was composed by G. P. Kapoor, and the cast included Chandra Mohan, Sardar Akhtar, Mazhar Khan, Sheela, Maya Devi and Eruch Tarapore.

The film revolves around an incestuous relationship that develops unwittingly between a brother and sister. The theme was "considered to be quite revolutionary" with a "daring" "thematic climax".

== Plot ==
Gyan and Rasik are good friends and when Gyan has to go to Africa for work, he leaves his wife Shobha (Sardar Akhtar) in care of Rasik and his wife Rambha (Maya Devi). Rasik has always liked Shobha but kept silent about it. Rambha goes to her parents' home, leaving Rasik and Shobha alone in the house. Rasik gives in to his feelings with Shobha being a willing participant. Soon Shobha gives birth to a daughter (Indira) whom Gyan believes to be his child. Rasik and Shobha are shocked when Gyan decides on an alliance between Indira and Rasik's son Madan seeing the close relationship they share.

== Cast ==
- Chandra Mohan as Rasik
- Sardar Akhtar as Roshan
- Mazhar Khan as Gyan
- Sheela as Indira
- Maya Devi
- Naval as Madan
- Eruch Tarapore
- Gulab
- Menaka
- Abu Bakar
- Ram Apte

== Review ==
The Filmindia editor, Baburao Patel, not known to have an amiable relationship with Modi, normally panned his films. However, for Bharosa, as cited by Amrit Gangar in his book, Patel's review carried the headline "Sohrab Modi Directs His First Good Picture" going to the extent of claiming that Bharosa was a better picture than Modi's Pukar.

== Soundtrack ==
The music director was G. P. Kapoor with lyrics by Lalchand Bismil. The singers were Khan Mastana, Menka, Sheela, Paresh Bannerji and Sardar Akhtar.

=== Song list ===
#	Title	Singer
1	"Bagiya Seencha Jaane"	Khan Mastana, Menka
2	"Chhum Chhum Chhanan Naach Rahi Hai Maya"	Menka
3	"Saanjh Bhai Samajh Na Paye"	Sheela
4	"Man Murkh Samajh NaPaye"	Menka
5	"More Naina Bhar Aaye Khushi Se"	Sheela
6	"Ghaat Se Bandhan Khol Re Sajan"	Sheela, Presh Bannerji
7	"Bairi Milan Na De Sajan"	Sheela, Presh Bannerji
8	"Bhor Bhai Uth Jaag Re Manwa"	Leela
9	"Kaahe Roki Baat Hamari Krishna Murari"	Sardar Akhtar
