= Mazhar Khan (actor, born 1905) =

Indian film actor, director, and producer (1905–1950)

- Mazhar Khan in and as Professor Waman Msc. (1938)
- Born: 18 October 1905; Bareilly, United Provinces of Agra and Oudh, British India
- Died: 24 September 1950 (aged 44); Bombay, Bombay State, India
- Occupations: Actor, producer, director
- Years active: 1926–1950

Mazhar Khan (18 October 1905 – 24 September 1950) was an actor, producer, and director in Indian Cinema. He began his career as a police officer, which he left to study law for a short period. After abandoning his studies, he came to Bombay and started his career in cinema with the silent film Fatal Garland (1928) opposite the top actress of the time, Ermeline. He became a popular actor, gaining success in several silent films. During his stint in silent films he worked with directors such as Bhagwati Prasad Mishra, Ezra Mir, Moti P. Bhagnani, R. S. Chowdhary, and Mohan Bhavnani. Magazines in the 1940s compared Khan to Hollywood actors such as Paul Muni, Bela Lugosi and Boris Karloff.

Khan transitioned to talkies with the end of the Silent Era. Nurjehan (1931), directed by Ezra Mir, was his first talkie picture. It received a positive response from the audiences establishing Khan as a profitable and dependable actor. He went on to work with the East India Film Company in Calcutta and Sagar Movietone, making films like Sultana, Night Bird, Salima and Sonhera Sansar. He then moved back to Bombay and worked under Ranjit Movietone. Having established himself in the different roles, he became renowned for his character depictions while also being respected in the film industry.

He formed his own production company, Asiatic Pictures, under which he made Yaad (1942), starring Veena, and Pehli Nazar (1945), starring Munawwar Sultana. The latter film was considered his directorial triumph in his obituary. His last role was in Usha Kiron (1952).

== Early life ==
Mazhar Khan was born on 18 October 1905, at Bareilly, Uttar Pradesh, India. He matriculated in Indore, Madhya Pradesh and then joined the police force in Dhar State. He rose to the rank of a sub-inspector before quitting. Following his father's wishes, he studied law but soon left that to move to Bombay and pursue a career in film. His tenure with the police trained him in horse riding and other "athletic abilities", which were proved helpful to him in his cinematic career.

According to Baburao Patel of Filmindia, B. P. Mishra recognized the "potential box-office attraction" of Khan. Within a week, Khan was given a role in 1928's Haiyan No Haar (English: Fatal Garland).

== Career ==
=== Silent films ===
Khan's debut film, Haiyan No Haar, was directed by Bhagwati Prasad Mishra and starring Ermeline, who was called the "queen of silent films". His role as Prince Ghiasudin was widely applauded and opened him up to new roles. His other films from 1926 to 1931 during the silent era include Durgesh Nandini (1926), Hoor-E-Baghdad (1928), Vasl Ni Raat, Be Dhaari Talwar (1929), Ram Rahim (1930), Hamara Hindustan (1930), Sinbad the Sailor (1930), Raj Tilak (1931) and Golibar (1931). Durgesh Nandini was directed by B. P. Mishra for Sudarshan Films and starred Ermeline and Madanrai Vakil. In his initial phase, he acted the villain in stunt films produced in that era. With the trend shifting to "mythological, historical and semi-social", he performed roles that required "a touch of extra realism".

Under the Imperial Film Company, Khan acted in 1927 Gamdeni Gori (English: Village Girl). It was directed by Mohan Bhavnani and co-starred Sulochana, Madanrai Vakil and Raja Sandow. The film is stated to be a "part of Imperial's calculated and successful effort to manufacture a star image for the actress (Sulochana)". The next year, Khan acted in B. P. Mishra's Hoor-E-Baghdad. 1929 had five films starring Khan, variously directed by Mishra, Bhavnani and Altekar, with the production company remaining Imperial.

In 1930, he acted in six films five of which were for Imperial and one for Sagar Film Company. Cinema Girl, which was termed a "Modern Girl" social genre, was directed by Bhagwati Mishra for Imperial Film Company and co-starred Prithviraj Kapoor and Ermeline. It "presented a fictionalised biography of its maker". The film also marked the debut of actor Prithviraj Kapoor in a prominent role; his first film being Do Dhaari Talwar directed by Mishra.

=== Talkies ===
==== 1930s ====
Nurjehan (1931) was Khan's debut talkie film. It was made by the Imperial Film Company and directed by Ezra Mir. The film starred Vimala, Mubarak, Nayampally and Jilloobai alongside Khan. The music director was Joseph David. The film "established" Khan in talkies. In 1932 he acted with actor-singer K. L. Saigal and Kumar in Subah Ka Sitara produced by New Theatres Ltd., Calcutta, and directed by Premankur Atorthy. Saigal was a new entry in the film industry and had made two film prior to this.

In 1933, Khan acted in films produced by East India Film Company: Nala Damayanti was directed by B. H. Rajhans, starring Khan along with Mukhtar Begum, Krishna Chandra Dey, and Indubala. Ek Din Ka Badshah (English: King For A Day) was again directed by Rajhans and had Sabita Devi, Indubala, and Bachan as co-stars. Aurat Ka Pyar (English: A Woman's Love) was directed by A. R. Kardar and starred Gul Hamid, Mukhtar Begum, Anwaribai and Bachan. Mushtaq Ahmed composed the music and lyrics were by Agha Hashar Kashmiri, who also scripted the film.

In 1934–1935, Khan acted in several films with Chandragupta (1934) a historical directed by A. R. Kardar, becoming a commercial success at the box-office, and Kardar being termed as a "talented film-maker". The film co-starred Nazir in the title role of Chandragupta, along with Sabita Devi and Gul Hamid. The other significant films of 1933 were Sultana, Mumtaz Begum and Night Bird, all produced by East India Film Company. His four films in 1935 were Sulagto Sansar (English: Murderer) directed by G. R. Sethi, Sauteli Ma (English: Stepmother) by S. D. Kerawala, Selima by Modhu Bose, and Bidrohi (English: Freedom Fighter) by Dhirendranath Ganguly.

1936 had Khan enacting a significant role along with Gul Hamid in Baghi Sipahi, an adaptation of Cardinal Richelieu (1935). A costume action drama, it was directed by A. R. Kardar and co-starred Bimla Kumari and Lalita. In 1939, Khan acted in the film Aap Ki Marzi, directed by Sarvottam Badami, and co-starring Sabita Devi and Motilal. It was based on the Edward Buzzell directed film Paradise for Three (1938) from Erich Kastner's novel Three Men in the Snow.

==== 1940s ====
In 1940, Khan played an important role in Achhut, a film made to "promote Gandhi's movement against untouchability". The cast included Motilal, Gohar Sitara Devi, and Noor Mohammed Charlie. It was produced by Chandulal Shah for his company Ranjit Studios. The premiere was attended by Sardar Vallabhbhai Patel. In Bharosa, Khan played the role of a man who leaves his wife (Sardar Akhtar) in the care of his trusted friend (Chandra Mohan) and his wife when he has to go abroad on work. The resulting consequences form the basis of the story. The film was directed by Sohrab Modi for Minerva Movietone.

In 1941, Khan acted in Padosi, directed by V. Shantaram for his Prabhat Film Company. It was made following communal tension at the formation of Muslim League. The film showed friendly relations between the Hindus and the Muslims. To achieve a better coalition, Shantaram had Khan, a Muslim, played a Hindu character, while Gajanan Jagirdar, a Hindu, played a Muslim character. His role as Thakur garnered critical acclaim.

Akela (1941) was another box-office success of Khan's. The film was directed by Pesi Karani for producer Kikubhai Desai and co-starred Bibbo and E. Billimoria.

By January 1942, Khan had continuously worked for fourteen years in the film industry and acted in over 112 films. He directed his first film in 1942, called Meri Duniya on Hindu-Muslim unity, for National Artists, Bombay. Khan played a Sufi philosopher with Hari Shivdasani and Kaushalya in lead roles. Khan set up his production company, Asiatic Pictures the same year, with the foundation ceremony for its maiden production Yad (Yaad) performed by V. Shantaram.

Under his new banner Mazhar Art Productions, Khan made Badi Baat (1944) and Pehli Nazar in 1945. Pehli Nazar introduced Munawwar Sultana to the Indian film industry. The film was directed by Khan, with story, dialogues and lyrics by Safdar "Aah". Singer Mukesh, who made his debut as a playback singer in 1941, in Nirdosh, gained popularity from Pehli Nazar, with the song, "Dil Jalta Hai Toh Jalne De" (Let The Heart Smolder), which became "an instant hit".

== Personal life and death ==
Mazhar Khan with wife and sons, Anwar and Afsar

Khan was reported to be "a boxer, a polo player, a football champ and an all-round athlete". They had two sons, Anwar and Afsar.

Khan cited directors Ezra Mir, S. F. Hasnain, A. R. Kardar, and V. Shantaram as major inspirations.

On September 24, 1950, Khan died of kidney failure in Mumbai, Maharashtra, India. He was 45.

== Filmography ==
List:

=== Silent films ===
Year	Film	Director	Co-stars	Producer
1926	Fatal Garland a.k.a. Haiyan No Haar	B. P. Mishra	Ermeline, Elizer, Jamshedji	Imperial Film Company
1926	Durgesh Nandini	Bhagwati Prasad Mishra (B. P. Mishra or Bhagwati Mishra)	Ermeline, Madanrai Vakil	Sudarshan Films
1927	Gamdeni Gori a.k.a. Village Girl	Mohan Bhavnani	Sulochana, W. M. Khan, Madanrai Vakil, Raja Sandow	Imperial Film Company
1928	Hoor-E-Baghdad	Bhagwati Mishra	Ermeline, W. M. Khan	Imperial Film Company, Saraswati Film Company
1929	Vasal Ki Raat a.k.a. Wedding Night	Parshwanath Yeshwant Altekar	Altekar, Jilloobai, Mubarak, Nayanpalli	Imperial Film Company
1929	Hawai Sawar a.k.a. Flying Prince	Mohan Bhavnani	D. Billimoria, Diana, Maya	Imperial Film Company
1929	Do Dhari Talwar (Be Dhari Talwar) a.k.a. Challenge	Bhagwati Mishra	Ermeline, E. Billimoria, Asooji, W. M. Khan	Imperial Film Company
1929	Khwab-E-Hasti a.k.a. Magic Flute	Mohan Bhavnani	Sulochana, D. Billimoria, Diana Belle, Baburao Sansare, Gohar	Imperial Film Company
1929	Mewad Nu Moti a.k.a. Jewel Of Rajputana	Bhagwati Mishra	Sulochana, D. Billimoria, Madanrai Vakil	Imperial Film Company
1930	Ram Rahim a.k.a. Ram and Rahim	K. P. Bhave	E. Billimoria, Gohar, W. M. Khan	Imperial Film Company
1930	Bachcha Sakka a.k.a. Joshe Jawani, Romance Of Youth	Moti B. Gidwani	Master Vithal, Gohar, Chabdrarao Kadam	Sagar Film Company
1930	Hamara Hindustan a.k.a. Father India	R. S. Chowdhary (Rama Chowdhary)	Sulochana, Jal Merchant, Madanrai Vakil, Jilloobai	Patel Brothers, Imperial Film Company
1930	Sinbad The Sailor a.k.a. Sinbad Khalasi	R. G. Torney	Elizer, Wagle, Sushila, Jamshetji	Imperial Film Company
1930	Intaqam a.k.a. Revenge	K. P. Bhave	Sultana, E. Billimoria, Baburao Sansare, W. M. Khan	Imperial Film Company
1930	Cinema Girl	Bhagwati Mishra	Prithviraj Kapoor, Ermeline, Baburao Sansare	Imperial Film Company
1931	Golibar a.k.a. Avenging Angels	Bhagwati Mishra	Prithviraj Kapoor, Ermeline, Romila	Sagar Film Company
1931	Kamar-Al-Zaman	Gazanafar Ali Shah	Pramila, Manorama, W. M. Khan	Imperial Film Company
1931	Raj Tilak	Madanrai Vakil	Ermeline, Mehboob Khan, Elizer, Gohar	Imperial Film Company

=== Talkies ===
Year	Film	Director	Co-stars	Producer
1931	Nurjehan a.k.a. Noor Jehan	Ezra Mir	Vimala, Mubarak, Nayampally	Imperial Film Company
1932	Subah Ka Sitara	Premankur Atorthy	K. L. Saigal, Kumar, Rattanbai	New Theatres Ltd., Calcutta
1933	Nala Damyanti	B. H. Rajhans	Mukhtar Begum, Krishna Chandra Dey, Indubala, Akhtari Muradabadi, Narmada Shankar	East India Film Company
1933	Ek Din Ka Badshah a.k.a. King For A Day	B. H. Rajhans	Sabita Devi, Indubala, Bachan	East India Film Company
1933	Aurat Ka Pyar a.k.a. A Woman's Love	A. R. Kardar	Gul Hamid, Mukhtar Begum, Anwaribai, Bachan	East India Film Company
1934	Night Bird a.k.a. Nishachar, Raat Ka Raja	Dhirendranath Ganguly	Gul Hamid, Indubala, Nazir, Anwari	East India Film Company
1934	Chandragupta	A. R. Kardar	Gul Hamid, Nazir, Sabita Devi	East India Film Company
1934	Sultana	A. R. Kardar	Gul Hamid, Indubala, Zarina, Nazir, Nawab	East India Film Company
1934	Mumtaz Begum	Akhtar Nawaz	Gul Hamid, Anwari, Bachan, Akhtari	East India Film Company
1935	Step Mother a.k.a. Sauteli Ma	S. D. Kerawala	Gul Hamid, Sultana, Indubala, Radharani	East India Film Company
1935	Sulagto Sansar a.k.a. Murderer	G. R. Sethi	Gul Hamid, Patience Cooper, Indubala, Lalita	East India Film Company
1935	Selima	Modhu Bose	Gul Hamid, Madhavi, Nandkishore	East India Film Company
1935	Bidrohi a.k.a. Freedom Fighter	Dhirendranath Ganguly	Gul Hamid, Sultana, Indubala, Radharani	East India Film Company
1936	Baghi Sipahi a.k.a. Rebel Soldier	A. R. Kardar	Patience Cooper, Bimla Kumari, Gul Hamid	East India Film Company
1936	Shaitan Ka Pash a.k.a. Devil's Dice	Ezra Mir	Khalil, Jehanara Kajjan, Peerjan	Madan Theatres
1936	Sunhera Sansar a.k.a. Golden World	Debaki Bose	Gul Hamid, Menaka Devi, Azurie, Rampiari, K. N. Singh	East India Film Company
1936	Hawai Daku a.k.a. Bandit Of The Air	S. R. Choudhary	Hashmat, K. N. Singh, Manjari, Bachchu	Modern India Talkies
1937	Khudai Khidmatgar	Vithaldas Panchotia	Rampyari, Sarla Devi, Khalil	Bharat Laxmi
1937	Milap	A. R. Kardar	Prithviraj Kapoor, Indira Devi, Rampyari, Yakub, M. Esmail	Moti Mahal Theatres
1938	Professor Waman MSc.	Manibhai Vyas	E. Billimoria, Sitara Devi, Rajkumari, Waheedan Bai	Ranjit Movietone
1938	Prithvi Putra	Jayant Desai	E. Billimoria, Waheedan, Ram Apte	Ranjit Movietone
1938	Rikshawala	Ezra Mir	Noor Mohammed Charlie, Waheedan, Dixit, Indubala, Ghory	Ranjit Movietone
1939	Meri Ankhein	Dwarka Khosla	Sitara Devi, Khursheed, Ishwarlal, Trilok Kapoor	Supreme Pictures
1939	Gazi Salaudin	I. A. Hafizji	Rattan Bai, Ishwarlal, Ghulam Mohammed, Yakub	Supreme Pictures
1939	Aap Ki Marzi a.k.a. As You Wish	Sarvottam Badami	Sabita Devi, Motilal, K. N. Singh	Sudama Productions
1940	Achhut a.k.a. The Untouchable	Chandulal Shah	Gohar, Motilal, Vasanti, Charlie	Ranjit Movietone
1940	Suhag	Balwant Bhatt	Kumar, Bibbo, Ashalata	Circo
1940	Bharosa a.k.a. Trust	Sohrab Modi	Chandra Mohan, Maya Devi, Sardar Akhtar	Minerva Movietone
1941	Mere Raja	T. M. Mani	E. Billimoria, Bibbo, Moti	Paramount
1941	Akela a.k.a. Alone	Pesi Karani	E. Billimoria, Bibbo, Moti	Great India Pictures
1941	Masoom a.k.a. The Innocent	S. F. Hasnain	Ramola, Mehtab, Nazir Kashmiri	Fazli Brothers
1941	Padosi a.k.a. Neighbours	V. Shantaram	Gajanan Jagirdar, Balakram, Anees Khatoon	Prabhat Film Company
1942	Bhakta Kabir	Rameshwar Sharma	Bharat Bhushan, Mehtab, Padma Devi	Unity Productions
1942	Raja Rani a.k.a. King And Queen	Najam Naqvi	Vanmala, Trilik Kapoor, Sunalini Devi, Maya Devi	Atre Pictures
1942	Meri Duniya a.k.a. Marvi or Umar Marvi	Mazhar Khan	Hari Shivdasani, Kaushalya, Ashiq Husain	National Artists
1942	Ghar Sansar a.k.a. Married Life	Vishnu Vyas	Sardar Akhtar, Nazir, Jehanara Kazan	Sunrise Pictures
1942	Nai Duniya	A. R. Kardar	Shobhana Samarth, Jairaj, Hari Shivdasani, Wasti	Circo
1942	Uljhan	N. R. Acharya	Sardar Akhtar, Anjali Devi, Rajkumari Shukla	Acharya Arts
1942	Yaad	Mazhar Khan	Veena, Shahzadi, Satish, Azurie	Asiatic Pictures
1944	Bachpan a.k.a. Childhood	Homi Wadia	Baby Madhuri, Chandraprabha, Nandrekar, Dixit	Basant Pictures
1944	Badi Baat	Mazhar Khan	Swarnalata, Ulhas, Kumar, Zarina, Yakub	Mazhar Arts
1944	Draupadi	Baburao Patel	Chandra Mohan, Sushila Rani, David, Kanhaiyalal	New Huns Pictures
1944	Phool a.k.a. The Flower	K. Asif	Veena, Sitara Devi, Suraiya, Prithviraj Kapoor	Famous Films
1945	Bisvi Sadi	Mohan Bhavnani	Motilal, Nargis, Gope, Bhudo Advani, Ashalata	Bhavnani Productions
1947	Naiya	Aslam Noori	Munawwar Sultana, Ashraf Khan, Shahzadi, Suman	Mohan Pictures
1948	Sona a.k.a. Gold	Mazhar Khan	Munawwar Sultana, Navin Yagnik, Madhuri, Dixit	Mazhar Art Productions
1949	Dil Ki Duniya	Mazhar Khan	Munawwar Sultana, Geeta Bali, Suman, Jaswant	Noble Art Productions
1950	Nirala	Devendra Mukherjee	Dev Anand, Madhubala, Yakub, Mumtaz Ali	M & T Films
1950	Usha Kiran	Jawad Hussain	Geeta Bali, Nimmi, Lalita Pawar	Tiger Films
