= Bagi =

Bagi may refer to:

- Baki, Awdal, Somaliland
- Bagi, the Italian name of the titular see of Bageis
- Bagi, the Monster of Mighty Nature, a 1984 Japanese anime film by Osamu Tezuka, or its titular character

== See also ==
- Baghi (disambiguation)
