= Sipahi (disambiguation) =

Sipahi were professional cavalrymen deployed by the Ottoman Empire.

Sipahi may also refer to:

== People ==
- Kenan Sipahi (born 1995), Turkish basketball player
- Nesrin Sipahi (born 1934), Turkish singer

== Places ==
- Sipahi, İskele or Agia Triada, a village in Cyprus
- Sipahi, Kastamonu, a village in Kastamonu Province, Turkey
- Sipahi, Uzunköprü, a village in Edirne Province, Turkey
- Sipahijala district, district of Tripura, India
  - Sepahijala Wildlife Sanctuary

== See also ==
- Spahi, African light-cavalry regiments of the French army
- Sipahiya, a 1949 Indian film by Aspi Irani
- Baghi Sipahi (disambiguation)
