= Baaghi =

Baaghi (Hindi and Urdu: 'rebel, rebellious') may refer to:

- Baaghi (1990 film), starring Salman Khan and Nagma
- Baaghi (2000 film), starring Sanjay Dutt
- Baaghi (film series), an Indian action thriller film series, starring Tiger Shroff
  - Baaghi (2016 film), the first installment in the series
  - Baaghi 2, the second installment in the series
  - Baaghi 3, the third installment in the series
  - Baaghi 4, the fourth installment in the series
- Baaghi (TV series), a Pakistani biopic about Qandeel Baloch

== See also ==
- Baghi (disambiguation)
