= Ghar Sansar (1942 film) =

- Song synopsis booklet cover
- Directed by: V. M. Vyas
- Written by: Mohanlal G. Dave
- Starring: Sardar Akhtar; Kajjanbai; Nazir; Mazhar Khan
- Cinematography: Haribhai; Sattar
- Music by: Shyam Babu
- Release date: 3 April 1943
- Country: India
- Language: Hindi

Ghar Sansar (Home Life) is a Bollywood film. It was released in 1942. The film was a family melodrama produced by Sunrise Pictures and directed by Vishnu M. Vyas, who also wrote the screenplay. The story was written by Mohan G. Dave. The music was composed by Shyam Babu with dialogues and lyrics by Ehsan Rizvi. It starred Sardar Akhtar, Mazhar Khan, Nazir and Kajjanbai in the main roles.

The story is about an elder brother and his wife called Bhabhi (sister-in-law), who make sacrifices in order to bring up the husband's younger brother. The situation in the family gets emotionally worsened when the younger brother marries and his wife creates mis-understandings.

== Plot ==
Devi Prasad (Mazhar Khan) lives with his virtuous wife Taramati (Sardar Akhtar) called "Bhabhi" by everyone, and with his younger brother Sundar (Nazir). Though not well off financially, both husband and the wife go through sacrifices to educate Sundar to become a lawyer. The bond between Bhabhi and Sundar is shown as warm and sincere.

Gopalji, who cheated Devi Prasad's father of his money is now eager to have his college-going daughter Lata (Kajjanbai) marry Suraj. The families agree but Sundar refuses for what Gopalji had done to his father. Sundar and Lata meet at a college picnic without realising their family connections and soon fall in love. Following his graduation, Sundar becomes a lawyer. He is reconciled to marrying the girl chosen for him by his brother but on discovering who the girl is after marriage, he is happy. Lata in spite of her rich background adjusts in Sundar’s house being respectful of Bhabhi and the older brother.

Kishori, a young friend of Lata's, enters this family equation and with her cunning ways she brings about disruption in Bhabhi and Lata's relationship by insinuating that Bhabhi wants the full ownership of the house. With the mis-understandings that arise, Devi Prasad, who had left his job on Sundar's insistence when he became a lawyer, realises that he is now dependent on Sundar for subsistence. However, when a particularly nasty row is created by Lata, Sundar slaps his Bhabhi. Deviprasad leaves the house with his wife and young daughter. Lata soon comes to her senses and sees the way she has been manipulated by Kishori. She catches Kishori flirting with Sundar and a fight starts. Devi Prasad who has come to give back some possessions gets involved, and falls down from the top floor and dies. When Sundar is accused of murdering his brother, Bhabhi arrives to acquit him.

== Cast ==
- Sardar Akhtar as Bhabhi
- Mazhar Khan as Devi Prasad
- Nazir as Sundar
- Kajjanbai as Lata
- Mirza Musharraf as Lallu, Lata's brother
- Miss Kalyani
- Baby Tara

== Review ==
The film was released on 3 April 1943, at Novelty Cinema, Bombay. Baburao Patel, editor of Filmindia in his June 1943 review, called the film "a long run of so much boring celluloid". He found the dialogues "insipid" and the songs bad. Kajjan's role as a teenage college girl was sharply criticised, with Patel claiming that Kajjan looked "more like a dowager than a college girl". His only praise came for actor Mazhar Khan: "Mazhar Khan, the superb artiste that he is, defies the direction and gives an excellent performance as 'Devi Prasad', the kind, loving elder brother". The film went on do successful business at the box-office in both Karachi and Bombay.

== Soundtrack ==
The music was composed by Shyam Babu Pathak with lyrics written by Ehsan Rizvi. The singers were Sardar Akhtar, Kajjan, Tara Bai, Miss Kalyani, Mumtaz.

=== Songlist ===
#	Title	Singer
1	"Asha Safal Tumhari"	
2	"Ae Sakhi Aa Gayi Rut Jawani"	Kajjan
3	"Badarva Barsan Ko Aaye"	Miss Kalyani
4	"Ek Sangdil Se"	Mumtaz
5	"Ghar Sansar Hamara"	Sardar Akhtar
6	"Jee Me Thani Hain Ke Hans Hans Ke Rulana Hoga"	Miss Kalyani
7	"Jhulun Hindola Shyam Sang"	Kajjan
8	"More Jivan Me Anand Chaya"	Sardar Akhtar, Tara Bai
