= Gul Hamid =

Indian actor

Gul Hamid (1905-1936) was an Indian actor. He started his acting career in silent films and later played leading roles in talkies. He had many honors to his credit. He acted in Heer Ranjha, the first film produced in Punjabi, and Seeta, a talkie that won an honorary diploma in the 1934 Venice Film Festival and that was also the first Indian film shown at an international film festival. Hamid also wrote the script, acted in, and directed the film Khyber Pass (1936). Hamid died of Hodgkin's Disease in 1936.

== Life ==
Gul Hamid was born in Pirpiai, Nowshera, a village near the Kabul River in the North West Frontier Province of British India (now in Pakistan). His father was Saif Ullah Khan. Gul Hamid Khan had three brothers named Abdul Hameed Khan, Gul Jamal Khan and Sayed Jamal Khan. Gul Hamid Khan was married to Patience Cooper (later Sabra Begum) from 1930–1936, one of the first early silent movie actors.

== Film career ==
"Gul Hamid, a handsome young man from Peshawar, became an all-India celebrity when A. R. Kardar cast him in his hit movie. It is said that the movie industry never again saw an actor with Gul Hamid's looks". He made his film debut with Sarfarosh alias Brave Hearts in 1930, which was a silent movie made in Lahore and directed by A. R. Kardar. In 1931, his films Aatishe Ishq and Wandering Dancer were released.

Gul Hamid also had the honour of working in the first ever Punjabi feature film Heer Ranjha released in 1932. This film was made in Lahore and directed by A. R. Kardar.

In 1933, his film Yahudi Ki Ladki was released based on Agha Hashar Kashmiri's play Yahudi Ki Larki.

Gul Hamid's film Seeta, produced by East India Film Company & directed by Debaki Bose was the first talkie shown in an international film festival when it was shown in 1934 at the Venice Film Festival, where it won an honorary diploma. His other films released in 1934 were Chandar Gupt, Mumtaz Begum, Sultana and Night Bird.

1935 was an important year of Gul Hamid's career as many of his films were released then. In Karwan-E-Hayat (a 1935 adventure film) and Bharat Ki Beti (1935), his heroine was Rattan Bai. His other notable talkies (films) in 1935 were Soteeli Maa, Badruhi, Saleema and Murderer. Yasmin was also released the same year, in which his name was Behram.

Only three films are present on the record to be released in 1936 i.e., Sunehra Sansar, Baghi Sipahi and Khyber Pass. He not only acted in Khyber Pass, but also wrote its script and directed it.

He worked with his wife, Patience Cooper, in three films i.e., Baghi Sipahi, Murderer (1935) and Khyber Pass. After starting his film career from Lahore, he moved to Calcutta, where he worked in more than a dozen silent films and talkies. Some of his films were made in Bombay too.

== Personal life ==
Gul Hamid Khan was married to Patience Cooper (later Sabra Begum) from 1930–1936, one of the first early silent movie actors.

== Death ==
He died in 1936 due to Hodgkin's lymphoma.

== Filmography ==
Year	Title	Director	Co-stars	Notes
1930	Safdar Jung	A. R. Kardar	Mumtaz Begum, Gulzar, Hiralal	Playart Phototone/United Players Corp.
1930	Sarfarosh	A. R. Kardar	Gulzar, Rafiqe Ghaznavi, Ghulam Qadir	Playart Phototone
1931	Farebi Shahzada	A. R. Kardar	Gulzar, M. Ismail, Hiralal	United Players Corp.
1931	Khooni Katar	A. R. Kardar	Gulzar, M. Ismail, Nazir	United Players Corp.
1931	Farebi Daku	A. R. Kardar	Gulzar, M. Ismail, Nazir	United Players Corp.
1932	Heer Ranjha	A. R. Kardar	Rafiq Ghaznavi, Anwari Bai, M. Ismail	Playart Phototone
1933	Aurat Ka Pyar	A. R. Kardar	Mukhtar Begum, Mazhar Khan, Anwari Bai	East India Film Company
1933	Yahudi Ki Ladki	Premankur Atorthy	K. L. Saigal, Rattan Bai, Pahari Sanyal	New Theatres
1934	Seeta	Debaki Bose	Prithviraj Kapoor, Durga Khote, Trilok Kapoor	East India Film Company
1934	Chandragupta	A. R. Kardar	Sabita Devi, Nazir Ahmed, Mazhar Khan	East India Film Company
1934	Sultana	A. R. Kardar	Zarina, Nazir Ahmed, Mazhar Khan	East India Film Company
1935	Murderer	G. R. Sethi	Lalita, Mazhar Khan	East India Film Company
1936	Baghi Sipahi	A. R. Kardar	Patience Cooper, Mazhar Khan, Bimla Kumari	East India Film Company
1936	Khyber Pass	Gul Hamid	Patience Cooper, Lalita Devi	East India Film Company
