= Badi Baat =

- Directed by: Mazhar Khan
- Starring: Mazhar Khan; Swaran Lata; Yakub; Khalil
- Music by: Feroz Nizami
- Release date: 1944
- Country: India
- Language: Hindi

Badi Baat is a Bollywood film. It was released in 1944.

== Cast ==
- Mazhar Khan
- Swaran Lata
- Yakub
- Khalil
- Ullhas
- Kumar
- Zarina
