= Aurat Ka Pyar =

1933 film

- Handbill
- Directed by: Abdul Rashid Kardar
- Written by: Agha Hashar Kashmiri
- Starring: Gul Hamid; Mukhtar Begum; Mazhar Khan; Anwari Bai
- Music by: Mushtaq Ahmed
- Production company: East India Film Company
- Release date: 1933
- Country: British India
- Language: Hindi

Aurat Ka Pyar (transl. "A Woman's Love") is a 1933 Indian film directed by A. R. Kardar. The film was produced by the East India Film Company, in Calcutta. Kardar had moved from Lahore to Calcutta where he directed several films for the company from 1933–36, including Aurat Ka Pyar. The music composer was Mushtaq Ahmed and lyrics were by Agha Hashar Kashmiri, who also scripted the film. It starred Gul Hamid, Mukhtar Begum, Mazhar Khan, Anwari Bai, Bacha, Abdul Sattar and Athar.

The film was a commercial success at the box office and proclaimed Kardar as a "talented film-maker".

== Cast ==
- Gul Hamid
- Mukhtar Begum
- Anwari Bai
- Bacha
- Athar
- Mazhar Khan
- A. R. Pahelwan

== Soundtrack ==
One of the notable songs from this film was the classical, "Chori Kahin Khule Na Naseem-e-Bahar Ki", sung by the famous singer and actress Mukhtar Begum in Raga Darbari. The music director was Mushtaq Ahmed and the lyricist was Agha Hashar Kashmiri.

=== Song List ===
#	Title
1	"Aaya Hoon Main Lekar Bahaar"
2	"Ae main Toh Lut Gayi Aake Tere Baagh Mein"
3	"Bekas Ki Naav Bhanwar Mein Maula Paar Lagaana"
4	"Chori Kahin Khule Na Naseem-e-Bahar Ki"
5	"Daali Daali Dulhan Bani"
6	"Dil Teer-E-Nazar ka Nishana Hua"
7	"Jo Khiza Hui Who Bahar Hoon"
8	"Karke Chale Teere Gham Ka Nishana Mujhe"
9	"Mohabbat Hi Hai Baag-eDuniya Ko Bahar"
10	"Shums-e-Qamar Ki Hai Shaadi Gao Khushi Ka Tarana"
