= Baqi, Zaveh =

Baqi بقیع
- Village
- Location within Iran
- Coordinates: 35°13′47″N 59°36′15″E
- Country: Iran
- Province: Razavi Khorasan
- County: Zaveh
- Bakhsh: Central
- Rural District: Safaiyeh

Population (2006)
  - Total: 136
- Time zone: UTC+3:30 (IRST)
  - Summer (DST): UTC+4:30 (IRDT)

Baqi (Persian: بقیع, also Romanized as Baqī‘ and Baqī; also known as Baghī, Boghī, and Baqīḩ) is a village in Safaiyeh Rural District, in the Central District of Zaveh County, Razavi Khorasan Province, Iran. At the 2006 census, its population was 136, in 36 families.

== See also ==
- List of cities, towns and villages in Razavi Khorasan Province
