= Seeta (1934 film) =

1934 film by Debaki Bose

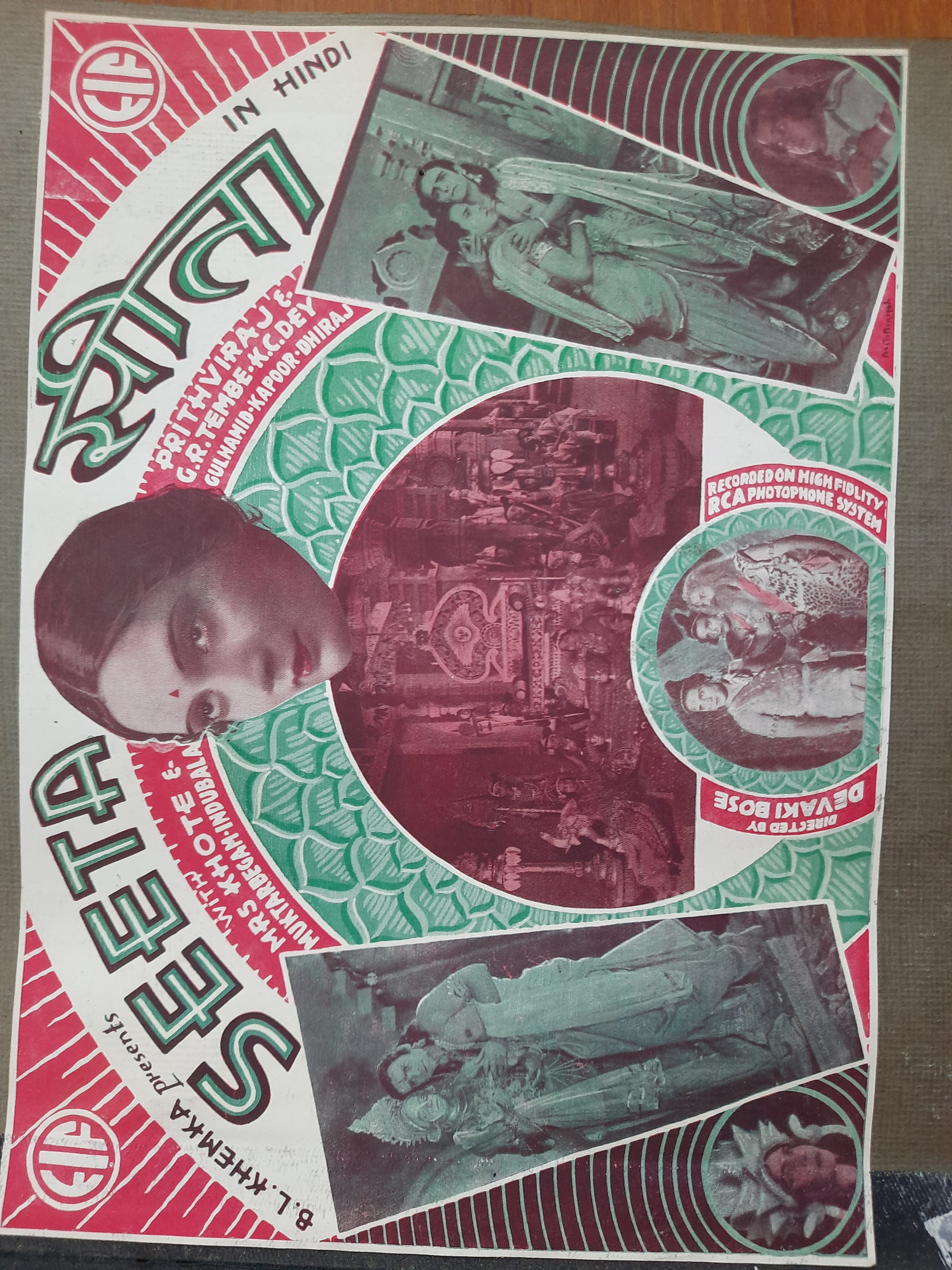
Promotional poster of 1934 film Seeta

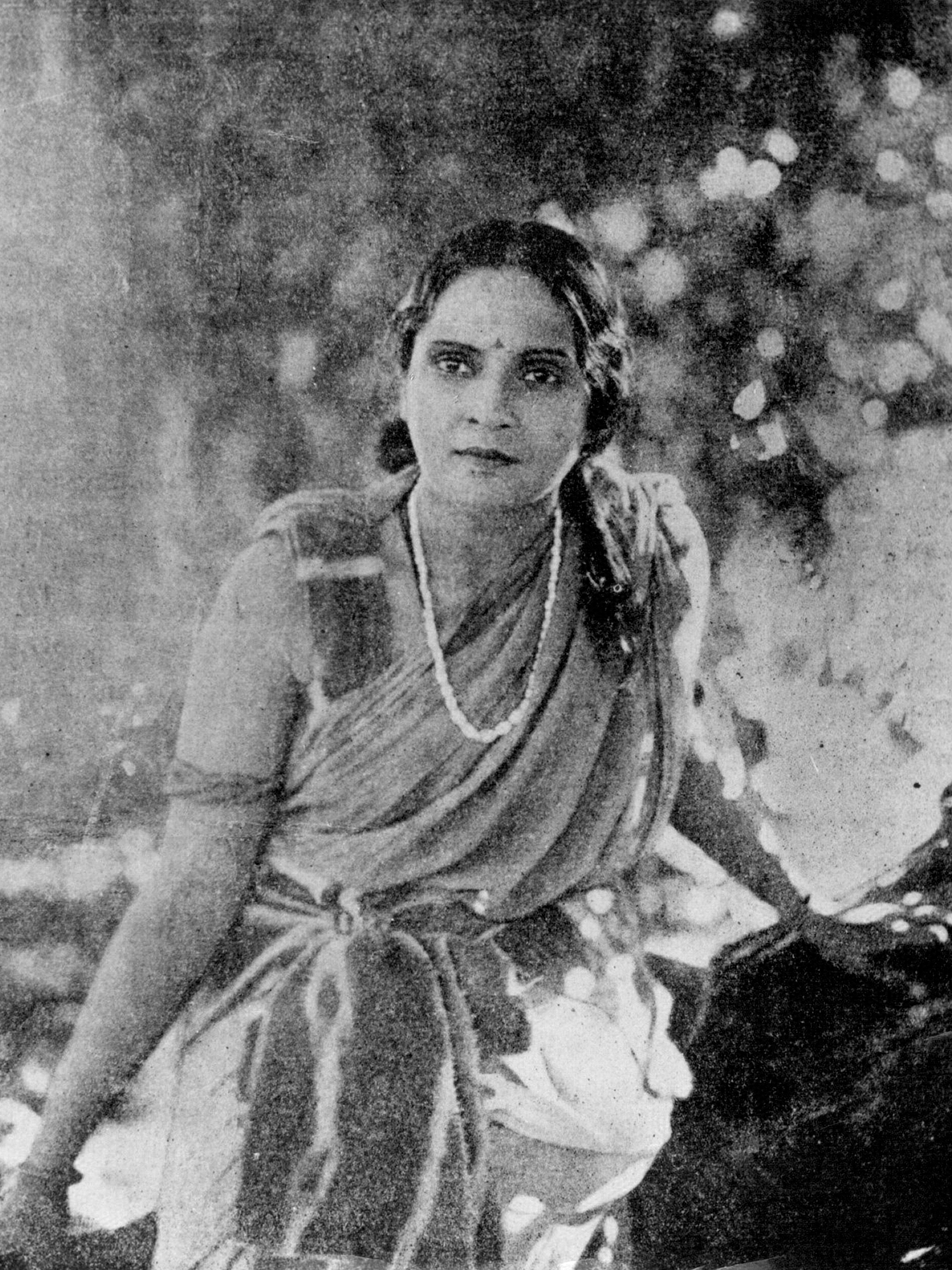
Durga Khote in Seeta

Seeta was a 1933 Indian talkie Bengali film, directed by Debaki Bose and produced by the East India Film Company. It won an honorary diploma in the 2nd Venice International Film Festival in 1934, becoming the first Indian talkie to be shown at an international film festival. The film starred Gul Hamid, Prithviraj Kapoor as Rama, his younger brother Trilok Kapoor as Lava, and Durga Khote as Sita.

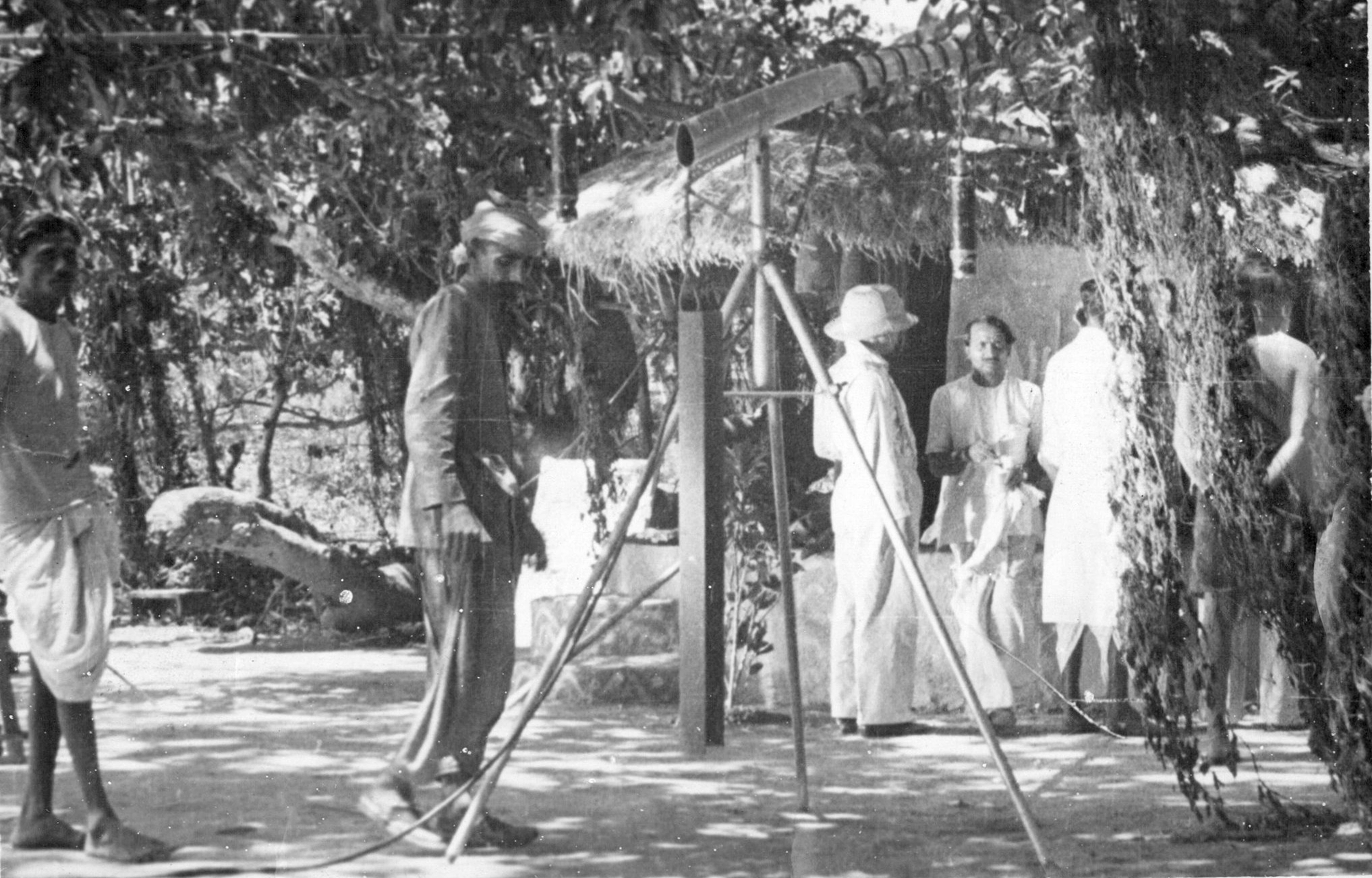
Shooting of Seeta
