= Baghi, Iran =

Baghi باغي
- Village
- Location within Iran
- Coordinates: 37°12′03″N 57°17′07″E
- Country: Iran
- Province: North Khorasan
- County: Esfarayen
- Bakhsh: Central
- Rural District: Ruin

Population (2006)
  - Total: 517
- Time zone: UTC+3:30 (IRST)
  - Summer (DST): UTC+4:30 (IRDT)

Baghi (Persian: باغي, also Romanized as Bāghī) is a village in Ruin Rural District, in the Central District of Esfarayen County, North Khorasan Province, Iran. At the 2006 census, its population was 517, in 104 families.
