= Khan Mastana =

Indian actor, singer, music director and composer (died 1972)

Khan Mastana खान मस्ताना

Background information
- Also known as: Hafiz Khan Mastana
- Died: 1972 Mumbai, India
- Occupations: Singer, Actor, Music director, Composer

Khan Mastana (died 1972) was an Indian actor, playback singer, music director and composer. He was called shehad jharti aawaz ke maalik.
