= Baghi Sipahi (1936 film) =

1936 film

- Directed by: Abdul Rashid Kardar
- Starring: Gul Hamid; Patience Cooper; Bimla Kumari; Mazhar Khan
- Music by: K. C. Dey
- Production company: East India Film Company
- Release date: 1936
- Country: India
- Language: Hindi

Baghi Sipahi (Rebel Soldier) is a 1936 Hindi/Urdu film directed by A. R. Kardar. It was an adaptation of Cardinal Richelieu (1935) directed by Rowland V. Lee, a Twentieth Century Pictures production, which was a big success at the box office. Baghi Sipahi, a costume action drama, was produced by the East India Film Company.

Gul Hamid played the lead, and it was cited as an "important film" for him. Patience Cooper, Bimla Kumari, Mazhar Khan and Lalita also played significant roles.

== Cast ==
- Gul Hamid
- Bimla Kumari
- Mazhar Khan
- Lalita Pawar
- Indubala
- Anees
- Azurie
- Mohammed Ishaq

== Reception ==
Baghi Sipahi was a big commercial success, which "won him (Kardar) a wide audience following". However, Kardar was also criticised for "plagiarising", but his handling of the story and theme earned him critical acclaim. The success of the film established East India Company on a large scale across the "Indian film map".

== Soundtrack ==
The music director was K. C. Dey, and the lyricist was Akbar Khan Peshawri.

=== Songlist ===
#	Title
1	"Ae Saqiye Mastana Bhar De Mera Paimana"
2	"Anokhi Vaza Hain Saare Jahan Se Nirale Hain"
3	"Bewafa Kis Se Ja Kar Kahun"
4	"Dil Teer-e-Nazar Ka Nishana Hua"
5	"Ilaaj Ki Nahin Haalat Dil-o-Jigar Ke Liye"
6	"Maston Pe Ungalian Na Uthao Bahaar Mein"
7	"Phir Dil Ko Namkada Mein Rakha Do"
8	"Saqiya Abr Abhi Aaya Nahin Maikhane Par"
9	"Sitam Hai Mashware Yeh Ho Rahein Hain"
10	"Yeh Aabroo Thi Tujhe Gal Ke Rubaru Karte"
