= East India Film Company =

The East India Film Company was an Indian film production company, based in Calcutta, Bengal Presidency, British India. It was the first Indian film company to screen a movie at an international film festival. Started in 1932 in Calcutta, by R. L. Khemka, it went on to be a pioneer in producing films across the several regional film industries, including Bengali, Hindi, Urdu, Telugu, and Tamil, in the decade after its founding; till then, production companies were restricted regionally.

== History ==
The company was formed in 1932 by R. L. Khemka, a local Marwari businessman in Bengal, after acquiring the RCA Photophone studio, its location recording equipment, and its Mitchell Cameras. In 1933, East India Film Company's first Bengali film production, Jamuna Puline, was released, with Priyanath Ganguli as the director after he left the Madan Theatre. Riding on its success, the company became the first Bengali studio to venture into not just Hindi films, but also various films in South Indian languages. East India Film Company was soon producing a dozen movie releases per year, including several hits like Savithri (Telugu) and Ramayan (Tamil).

The East India Film Company's Seeta, made by Debaki Bose, was the first talkie shown in an international film festival when it was shown in 1934 at the Venice Film Festival, where it won an honorary diploma. Subsequently, Bose also made his noted film, Sonar Sansar (Hindi: Sunhera Sansar) in 1936 under the East India Film Company banner.

Shot in Calcutta on a lavish budget of Rs.75,000, East India Film Company's Sati Savithri in Telugu was a huge hit. Based on a popular stage play by Mylavaram Bala Bharathi Samajam, the film was directed by debutant C. Pullaiah and starred stage stalwarts Vemuri Gaggaiah and Dasari Ramathilakam as Yama and Savithri, respectively. Like Seeta, this film was also screened at Venice Film Festival, where it too won an honorary diploma.

== Filmography ==
- Vara Vikrayam (1939)
- Anasuya (1936)
- Leyli o Majnun (1936)
- Sunehra Sansar (1936)
- Baghi Sipahi (1936)
- Murderer (1935)
- Selima (1935)
- Step Mother (1935)
- Chandragupta (1934)
- Kismet Ki Kasauti (1934)
- Night Bird (1934)
- Seeta (1934)
- Sultana (1934)
- Aurat Ka Pyar (1933)
- King for a Day (1933)
- Nala Damyanti (1933)
- Radha Krishna (1933)
- Savithri (1933)
- Jamuna Puline (1933)
