= Sitara Devi =

Indian dancer and actress (1920–2014)

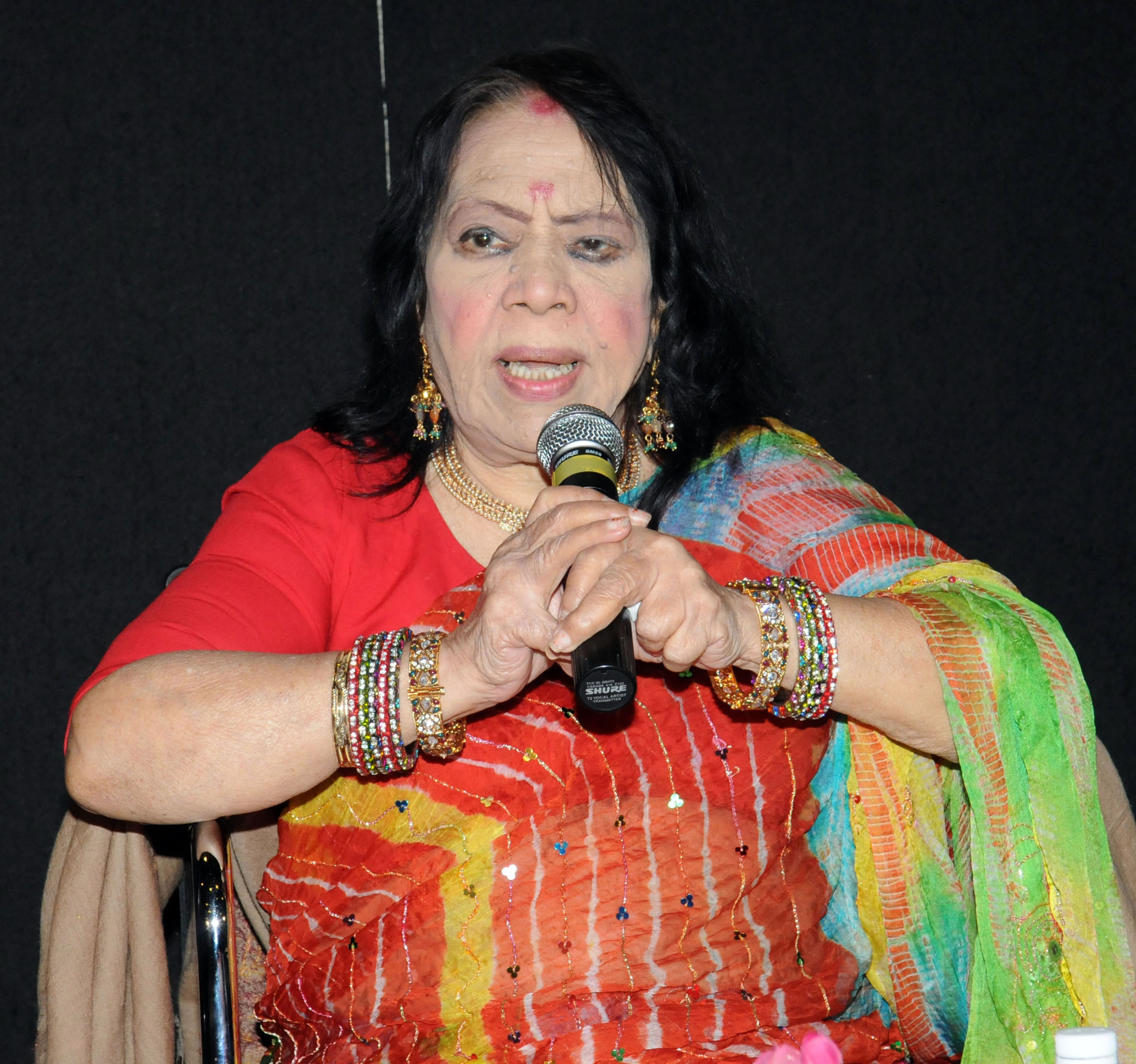
- Sitara c. 2010
- Born: Dhanalakshmi; 8 November 1920; Calcutta, British India
- Died: 25 November 2014 (aged 94); Mumbai, India
- Occupations: Kathak dancer, actress, singer
- Spouses: Mr. Desai; Nazir Ahmed Khan; K. Asif; Pratap Barot
- Children: Ranjit Barot; Jayanti Mala

Sitara Devi (born Dhanlakshmi; 8 November 1920 – 25 November 2014) was an Indian dancer of the classical Kathak style of dancing, a singer, and an actress. She was the recipient of several awards and accolades, and performed at several prestigious venues in India and abroad; including the Royal Albert Hall, London (1967) and at the Carnegie Hall, New York (1976).

At a young age Devi met Rabindranath Tagore. He out of affection described her as Nritya Samragni (नृत्य सम्राज्ञी ), meaning the empress of dance, after watching her performance when she was just sixteen years old. Some people consider her as the Kathak queen.

== Early life and background ==
Sitara Devi was born in Kolkata (then Calcutta) on 8 November 1920, that coincided in that year with the festival of Dhanteras, the eve of the Indian festival of Deepavali. She was named Dhanlakshmi, in honour of the goddess of good fortune who is worshiped on that day.

Devi's paternal family was of Brahmin heritage and from the city of Varanasi, but had settled in Kolkata for many years. Her father, Sukhdev Maharaj, was a Brahmin gentleman and a Vaishanavite scholar of Sanskrit, and earned his livelihood by teaching and performing the Kathak dance form. Devi's mother, Matsya Kumari, and her family belonged to the community of performing artists. Her father developed a passion for classical dance and study in-depth Bharata Natyam and Natya Shastra and practiced and performed Kathak in which he excelled. This passion for dance was something he passed on to his daughters, Alaknanda, Tara, and Dhanlakshmi alias Dhanno; and to his sons, Chaube and Pande.

She learnt dancing from her father, who established a school to teach dancing to children including his daughters and sons. Her dancing style consisted of both Benaras and Lucknow Gharana, a combination of ‘naaz’, ‘nakhre’ and ‘nazakat.'.

Like the tradition of the time, Devi was to be married when she was a young girl of eight, and her child bridegroom's family wanted to solemnize the marriage. However, she resisted, and wanted to be in a school. At her insistence, the marriage did not take place, and she was admitted into Kamachhagarh High School. While at school, a dance drama based on the mythological story of Savitri and Satyavan was to be enacted in a cultural program to be conducted by the students of the school. The school was searching amongst the students for someone to do a dance sequence embedded in the dance drama. Devi prevailed upon her teacher by showing her an impromptu dance performance. The performance clinched the role for her and she was also assigned the task to teach the dance to her co-performers in the sequence. Dhanno was re-christened as Sitara, and was entrusted with the care of her elder sister, Tara, and to impart her dancing lessons. Incidentally, Tara is the mother of famous Kathak dancer, Pt. Gopi Krishna.

By the time Devi had turned ten, she was giving solo performances, mostly during the fifteen-minute recess during movies in a cinema of her father's friend. Her commitment to learning dance left her with very little time, and she did not continue her schooling. By the time she was eleven, her family moved to Bombay (now called Mumbai). Soon after reaching Bombay, Devi gave a Kathak performance in the Atiya Begum Palace before a select audience, which included Rabindranath Tagore, Sarojini Naidu and Sir Cowasji Jehangir. She impressed Tagore who wanted her to give a special performance in Tata Palace. There the eleven-year-old dancing damsel studied kathak, with all its nuances, for three hours. Tagore called her to congratulate her in the traditional Indian style of giving her a shawl and a gift of Rs. 50 as a token of his appreciation.

Her debut was at Jehangir Hall (Mumbai), then the centre of metro's cultural life. When she was a twelve-year-old girl, Devi was recruited by Niranjan Sharma, a filmmaker and a dance director, and she gave dance sequences in some Hindi movies including her debut in Usha Haran 1940, Nagina 1951, Roti, Vatan 1938, Anjali 1957 (directed by Chetan Anand, brother of Dev Anand). In Mother India 1957, she performed a Holi dance dressed as a boy, and this was her last dance in any movie. She stopped performing dances in movies, as they were adversely affecting her study in the classical dance, Kathak.

== Personal life ==
Sitara Devi married four times. Her first husband was one Mr Desai; little is known about him. Her second husband was the actor Nazir Ahmed Khan (not to be confused with Nasir Khan who was Nazir's son-in-law). The age difference between them was sixteen years, and Nazir's first wife, Sikandara Begum, was always present. There was also a profound difference of religion, Khan being a Muslim and Sitara Devi a Hindu. At that time (before 1956), it was not possible for people belonging to different religions to marry and not possible for husband and wife to belong to different religions. Sitara converted to Islam in order to enter into this marriage. This marriage was both short-lived and childless, and they were soon divorced.

Sitara Devi's third marriage was to film-maker K. Asif, who was not only the first cousin of her second husband, but also the brother of Sikandara Begum.This marriage also did not last very long, and it was childless.

After her third divorce, Sitara married Pratap Barot, a Hindu gentleman of Gujarati heritage. The couple had a son, Ranjit Barot, born in 1950.

== Recognition ==
Devi received a number of awards, including Sangeet Natak Akademi Award (1969), the Padma Shree (1973) award and the Kalidas Samman (1995) award.

She refused to accept the Padma Bhushan award, declaring, "it is an insult, not an honor," and as a report from the Press Trust of India quoted her saying: "is this government not aware of my contribution to Kathak? I will not accept any award less than Bharat Ratna."

On 8 November 2017, Google showed a Doodle in India for Sitara Devi's 97th Birthday.

== Later years ==
Although her forte was Kathak, she was also an accomplished dancer in many other styles of dancing including Bharatanatyam and many forms of folk dances of India. She also learned the Russian ballet, and other dances of the western world. With advancing age, her dancing activities diminished, and she was working on compiling a book encapsulating the research done by her father and her in the field of dancing, especially in Kathakali style of dancing. She taught Kathak dancing to Bollywood celebrities such as Madhubala, Rekha, Mala Sinha, and Kajol. She envisioned formalizing her teaching, and planned to set up a Kathak training academy.

She died on 25 November 2014, at Jaslok Hospital in Mumbai, after a prolonged illness.

== See also ==
List of Kathak exponents
