= Nazir Ahmed Khan =

Founding Father of Pakistan film industry (1904–1983)

Nazir
- Born: 1904; Lahore, Punjab, British India
- Died: 26 August 1983 (aged 78–79); Lahore, Punjab, Pakistan
- Other name: Baau Jee (a popular nickname for him in the Pakistani film industry)
- Occupations: Actor, film director, film producer
- Spouses: Sikandara Begum; Sitara Devi; Swaran Lata
- Children: Afzal Nazir, Akhtar Nazir (Cooki), Suraiya Nazir (w/o Nasir Khan), Aslam Nazir, Ismat Nazir and 2 others Asif Nazir Khan (Grandson, CEO Nazir Asif Arts)
- Awards: Nigar Award 'Special Nigar Award for 30 years of Excellence' in Pakistani film industry in 1982

Nazir Ahmed Khan (1904 – 26 August 1983) (Urdu: نذیر احمد خان) was one of the founding fathers of Pakistan film industry. He was a versatile filmmaker, actor, director and producer.

== Early life ==
Nazir was born in 1904 in a Kakazai Pathan family in Lahore, Punjab, British India. He was one of the earliest Muslim entrants in the Indian film industry during the silent era.

Nazir had close familial ties to several key figures in South Asian cinema. He was a cousin of acclaimed Indian director K. Asif, best known for directing Mughal-e-Azam (1960). Nazir later married K. Asif's sister, Sikandara Begum, making him Asif's brother-in-law as well.

Nazir's brother Akhtar Nazir (also known as Ajmal) and other family members also worked in Pakistani cinema in various capacities.

== Career ==
=== British India ===
In 1929, Nazir moved to Calcutta (now West Bengal, India), where he began his film career. His first film role, as an actor, came from another Lahori friend, veteran film producer/director A. R. Kardar in the 'Silent-era' film Sarfarosh (Brave Heart) in 1929. Then he acted in several films including the notable Baghban (1938 film) which was a success at the box-office as well. Nazir then started producing and directing films under the banner of "Hind Pictures' and also established a film studio in Bombay.

=== Pakistan ===
In 1947, Nazir decided to migrate to newly-independent Pakistan and settled in Lahore. After making some mediocre films with meager resources, he made the first silver jubilee film of Pakistani cinema in Punjabi language, Pheray (1949).

During his career spanning 55 years, Nazir had done more than 200 films.

== Personal life ==
He had at least three wives over the years. He was first married to his cousin Sikandara Begum, who was the sister of K. Asif, the legendary director of the 1960 film Mughal-e-Azam. He later had a very short marriage with Sitara Devi, the legendary Kathak dancer. Nazir's last wife was film actress Swaran Lata.

Nazir was the father of several children. One of his daughters married actor Nasir Khan, brother of Dilip Kumar.

== Death ==
Nazir Ahmed Khan died on 26 August 1983.

== Awards and recognition ==
- Nigar Award 'Special Nigar Award for 30 years of excellence' in Pakistani film industry in 1982.

== Filmography ==
- Sawaal (1966)
- Azmat-e-Islam (1965)
- Haveli (1964)
- Billo Jee (1962)
- Shama (1959)
- Noor-e-Islam (1957)
- Sabira (1956)
- Soteeli Maa (1956)
- Wehshi (1956)
- Hameeda (1956)
- Nagin (1955)
- Naukar (1955)
- Heer (1955)
- Shehri Babu (1953)
- Khatoon (1952)
- Bheegi Palkain (1950)
- Anokhi Dastan (1950)
- Humari Basti (1950)
- Ghalat Fahmi (1950)
- Laraay (1949)
- Pheray (1949)
- Sachchai(1947)
- Heer (1946)
- Wamaq Azra (1946)
- Gaon Ki Gori (1945)
- Laila Majnu (1945)
- Naatak (1944)
- Aabroo (1943)
- Ghar Sansar (1942)
- Maa Baap (1941)
- Swami (1941)
- Taj Mahal (1941)
- Apni Nagariya (1939)
- Joshe Islam (1938)
- Baghban (1938)
- Bhabi (1938)
- Sitara Tanzi (1937)
- Dukhiyari (1936)
- Pratima (1935)
- Delhi Ka Thug (1934)
- Iraq Ka Chor (1934)
- Chandragupta (1934)
- Sultana (1934)
- Night Bird (1933)
- Abe Hayat (1933)
- Lal-e-Yaman (1933)
- Zarina (1932)
- Farebi Daku (1931)
- Sarfarosh or (Brave Heart) (1929) (A Silent-era film) (Producer: A. R. Kardar)

== See also ==
- List of Lollywood actors
- List of Pakistani film directors
