= List of Hindi films of 1931 =

A list of films produced by the Hindi film industry based in Bombay in 1931:

== 1931 ==
1931 was a ground-breaking year for Indian cinema. The first Hindi talkie Alam Ara was released on 14 March 1931 in Mumbai's Majestic Cinema. The film was produced by Imperial Movietone and directed by Ardeshir Irani. It starred Master Vithal, Zubeida, Prithviraj Kapoor and Wazir Mohammed Khan. The first song to be sung in films was by Wazir Mohammed Khan for Alam Ara, "De De Khuda Ke Naam Par" under the music direction of Firozeshah Mistry.

This year saw the release of 207 silent films from all over India and 28 Talkies. Out of the 28 talkies 23 were in Hindi, 3 in Bengali, one in Tamil, and one in Telugu. The first Bengali film was Jamai Shashthi by Madan Theatres Calcutta. The first Tamil film was Kalidas produced by Imperial Movietone and the first Telugu talkie Bhakta Prahlada, was directed by H. M. Reddy for Bharat Movietone.

Madan Theatres Ltd, who had lost out in the race to produce the first talkie in India with Shirin Farhad which followed two months later, produced 8 Talkies from Calcutta. Shirin Farhad was "twice as successful" compared to Alam Ara, and had 17 (out of the 18) songs sung by Jahanara Kajjan and Master Nissar.

== A ==
| Title | Director | Cast | Genre | Notes |
|---|---|---|---|---|
| Aatishe Ishq | Dhirubhai Desai | Prabhashankar, Chandrarao Kadam, Mumtaz, Hamid, P. R. Joshi, Budhikar | | Saroj Film Co. |
| Abhishek a.k.a. The Anointment | Prafulla Roy | Uma Sashi, Jiban Ganguly, Bhaskar Paul, Veena, Chani Dutta, Bela Rani, Purnima Shome | | Graphic Arts, Calcutta. |
| Abul Hasan | Prafulla Ghosh | Khatoon, Master Bachchu, Hadi, Shahzadi | | Sagar Movietone. |
| Afghan Abla | Narayan Deware | Begum Fatma, Ebrahim, Jamuna, Raja Babu, Usha, Ganibabu | | Kohinoor United Artists. |
| Alam Ara | Ardeshir Irani | Master Vithal, Zubeida, Prithviraj, Sushila, Jagdish Sethi, Wazir Mohammed Khan, Elizer, Sakhu, Miss Jilloo, Lakshmi Vara Prasad | Costume | Imperial Film Company. Music: Behram Irani, Ferozeshah Mistry |
| Albeli Mumbai | Nanubhai Vakil | E. Billimoria, Shanta Kumari, Ghory | | Ranjit Film Company. |
| Alladin and the Wonderful Lamp | Jal Ariah | Patience Cooper, Miss Sylvia, Ratansha Sinore | Fantasy | Madan Theatres Ltd. |
| Amir Khan | Ganpat Shinde | Anasuya, Kishori Pathak, Sakharam Jadhav, Mathura | | Hindustan Cinema Film Co, Nasik. |
| Aparadhi a.k.a. The Criminal | Debaki Bose | P.C. Barua, Sabita Devi, Samar Ghosh, Shanti Gupta, Renubala, Sushil Majumdar, Prabhavati, Arti Devi, Purnima Shome, Nirmal, Radhikanand | Social | Barua Film Unit, Calcutta |
| Asire Hirs a.k.a. Nemesis of Lust | Haribhai Desai | Manohar, Jamadagni, Jamu Patel, Baburao Gade, Zunzharao Pawar, Baby Garbo | | Surya Film Co. Bangalore. |
| Awara Raqasa a.k.a. Bhatakta Joban | Abdul Rashid Kardar | Nazir, Begum Gulzar, Gul Ahmed, Rukhia Khatoon, Hiralal | Social | United Player's Corp. Lahore. |
| Anang Sena | M. Gidwani | Zohrajan, Master Vithal, Mushtari, Elizer, Jagdish Sethi Jilloobai | Costume | |

== B-C ==
| Title | Director | Cast | Genre | Notes |
|---|---|---|---|---|
| Baaz Bahadur a.k.a. Rani Rupmati | Bhal G. Pendharkar | Sulochana (Ruby Myers), Choudhary | Historical Drama | Maharashtra Film Co. Kolhapur |
| Badmash a.k.a. Rascal | Rama Chowdhary | Jal Merchant, Yasmin, Jyotsana, Dixit | | Navjawan Film Co. |
| Bahadur Beti | A. P. Kapoor | Zebunissa, P. Jairaj, Meharbanu, Miss Salu | Social | Sharda Film Company. |
| Banke Sawariya | Jayant Desai | E. Billimoria, Ishwarlal, Shanta Kumari, Ghory, Manilal | | Ranjit film Company. |
| Bewafa Ashiq | Dr. Alvaro | Bhagwandas, Leelavati, Fatma | | Surya Prakash Film Co. |
| Bharati Balak | Agha Hashar Kashmiri | Patience Cooper, Master Mohan, D. Sarkari, Sharifa, Surajram, Mohammed Ishaq | Costume | Madan Theatres Ltd. |
| Bijli | Ramankant, Ghare Khan | Indira Devi, Dixit, Bhagwandas, Jaswant | | Navjawan Co. |
| Chandbibi a.k.a. Queen of Ahmednagar | N. D. Sarpotdar | Kamla Devi, Hira Dharwadkar, Jadhavrao, Varne, Bhaurao Datar | Historical Drama | Aryan Film Co. |
| Chandrasena | V. Shantaram | Kamla Devi, Leela pendharkar, Gulab, G. R. Mane | Historical Drama | Prabhat Film Company. |
| Chintamani | Kanjibhai Rathod | Shanta Kumari, Haider Shah, Master Mohammed, Kashinath, Manjula, Fateh Singh | Devotional | Bharat Movietone. Music: Lyrics: |

== D-F ==
| Title | Director | Cast | Genre | Notes |
|---|---|---|---|---|
| Dagabaaz Dushman | Kantilal Patel | Yusuf, Gulab | | East India Film Co. |
| Dard-E-Jigar a.k.a. Songs of Sorrow | R. N. Vaidya | Khalil, Nurjahan | | Sharda Film Co. |
| Darkness To Light | Bapsy Sabavala | | | Bapsy Sabavala |
| Dhartikamp | Harshadrai Mehta | Navinchandra, Mohini, Baburao Apte, Nizam, Bhim, Alam Sultan, Lobo, Manilal | | Mehta Luhar Productions. |
| Daulat Ka Nasha | Pesi Irani | Master Vithal, Khalil, Tarabai, Hadi, Jilloobai, Jamshedji, Makand | Social | Talkie. Imperial Movietone. Music: Firoz Shah Mistry, Mohammed Hadi; Lyrics: |
| Debi Choudhrani | Priyanath Ganguly | Anupama, Kartik Roy, Naresh Mitra, Rani Sundari, Shyam Mukherjee, Nani | Social | Madan Theatres Ltd Silent |
| Devi Devyani | Chandulal Shah | D. Billimoria, Gohar Mamajiwala, Bhagwandas, Keki Adjania, Miss Kamla, Baburao Sansare, Baba Vyas, Sudhir | Mythology | Talkie. Ranjit Film Company. Music: Jhandekhan; Lyrics: Narayan Prasad Betab |
| Digvijay | Asooji | P. Jairaj, Sitara Devi, Gulab | | Sharda Film Company |
| Dilawar | R. G. Torney | Master Vithal, Pramila, Mehboob Khan, Lakshmi, Mubarak | | Sagar Movietone |
| Diler Daku | JBH Wadia, Homi Wadia | Fatma Jr, Yashwant Dave, Mumtaz | Action | Young United Players. Silent film. |
| Diwani Duniya | Naval Gandhi | Thomas, Zubeida | | Kohinoor United Artists. |
| Draupadi | Bhagwati Prasad Mishra | Prithviraj Kapoor, Ermeline, Khalil, Jagdish Sethi, Jilloobai, Rustom Irani, Nayampally, Hadi, Elizer | Mythology | Imperial Movietone. Music: Lyrics: |
| Dushman-e-Iman | Homi Master | Ebrahim, Jamuna, Raja Babu | | Pratap Pictures. |
| Dushman Ki Raat a.k.a. Night of Terror | Balasaheb Yadav | Nandrekar, Sushila Devi, Balasaheb Yadav, Padmabai | | Maharashtra Film Co, Kohlapur. |
| Eye For An Eye a.k.a. Meethi Chhuri | Madanrai Vakil | Zubeida, Yakub, Khurshid, Romila, Ghulam Qadir, Sankatha Prasad, Salvi | | Sagar Film Company. Silent film. |
| Farari a.k.a. Outlaw | Y. D. Sarpotdar | | | University Art Federation. |
| Farebi Daku a.k.a. Mysterious Bandit | Abdul Rashid Kardar | Gul Hamid, Gulzar, Nazir, M. Ismail, Hiralal | Action | United Player's Corp. Lahore. |
| Farebi Shahzada | A. R. Kardar | Gul Hamid, Gulzar, Nazir, M. Ismail, Hiralal | Costume Action | United Player's Corp. |
| Fauladi Firman a.k.a. Fists of Steel | Baburao | Wamanrao Kulkarni, Master Bachchu, Jen, Baburao Gade | Action | Surya Film Co, Bangalore. |

== G-L ==
| Title | Director | Cast | Genre | Notes |
|---|---|---|---|---|
| Gayab-e-Garud a.k.a. Black Eagle | Harilal M Bhatt | Keki Adjania, Miss Mani, Paro Nag | | Mahavir Photoplays, Hyderabad |
| Ghar Ki Lakshmi | Kanjibhai Rathod | Rampyari, M. Gaznavi, Sardar | | Krishnatone. Silent film |
| Ghulami Zanjeer | | Haider Shah, Durga, Rafiq Ghaznavi, Manohar | | Krishna Film Co. |
| Ghunghatwali | Nandlal Jaswantlal | Madhuri, Ishwarlal, Baburao Sansare, Thatte | | Ranjit Film Co. |
| Golibar | Bhagwati Mishra | Prithviraj Kapoor, Ermeline, Mazhar Khan, Romila | | Sagar Movietone |
| Gulam | Moti B. Gidwani | Master Vithal, Manorama, Zaverbhai Qaiser | | Imperial Film Company. |
| Gwalan a.k.a. Milkmaid | Nagendra Majumdar | E. Billimoria, Sultana | | Ranjit Film Company. Music: Lyrics: |
| Harishchandra | Kanjibhai Rathod | Haidar Shah, Neelam, Kashinath, Master Mohammed, Fateh Shah | Mythology | Talkie. Krishnatone. Music: Master Mohammed; Lyrics: |
| Heer Ranjha | J. P. Advani | Shanta Kumari, Master Fakir | Legend Romance | Talkie. Krishnatone. Music: Ali Baksh; Lyrics: |
| Hoor-E-Misar | Prafulla Ghosh | Zubeida, Master Vithal | | Sagar Film Company. |
| Hoor-E-Roshan | Nanubhai Vakil | D. Billimoria, Madhuri | | Ranjit Film Company |
| Hridaya Veena | A. P. Kapoor | P. Jairaj, Zebunissa, Ata Mohammed | | Sharda Film Co. |
| Husn Pari | A. P. Kapoor | P. Jairaj, Mehtab | | Sharda Film Co. |
| Intaqam | Haribhai Desai | Manohar, Waman Rao, Jena, Peters, Zhunzharrao Pawar, Baburao Gade | | Surya Film Company, Bangalore. |
| Iraq Ka Chor | K. P. Bhave | Sushila, Vasantrao Pehalwan | Costume Action | National Film Co, Hyderabad |
| Jadu-E-Mohabbat a.k.a. Magic of Love | Harshadrai Mehta | Gulab, Nandram | | Sharda Film Co. |
| Jamai-Babu | Kalipada Das | Kalipada Dass, Radharani, Pravat Coomar, Sibapada Bhowmick, Amulya Bandhopadhay, Rajen Barooah, Sadhana Devi | Comedy | Hira Film Coy. Silent film |
| Kamar Al-Zaman | Gazanfarali Shah | W. M. Khan, Sultana, Pramila, Mazhar Khan, Cho Cho Lam, Jamshedji, Manorama Sr, Tarabai, Hansraj | Costume | Imperial Film Company |
| Khooni Katar a.k.a. Golden Dagger | Abdul Rashid Kardar | Miss Gulzar, Gul Hamid, M. Ismail, Hiralal, Ghulam Qadir, M. Zahoor | Action | United Player's Corp. Lahore. |
| Khuda Ki Shaan | Rama Chowdhary | Sulochana (Ruby Myers), Salvi, Elizer, Sushila, Raghunath, Makanda | | Imperial Film Company |
| Kismet Ki Hera Pheri | R. L. Shorey | Haider Shah, Zohrajan, Maqbul, Miss Sardar, Abdul Rashid Kardar, Harold Lewis (Majnu), Hukum Singh, Kamla Devi | Costume | Oriental Players, Lahore. Pioneer Film Co., Punjab. |
| Laila Majnu 1 | J. J. Madan | Jehanara Kajjan, Master Nissar, Shaila | Legend Romance | Talkie. 24 songs. Madan Theatres Ltd. Music: Brijlal Varma; Lyrics: |
| Laila Majnu 2 | Kanjibhai Rathod | Haider Shah, Rampyari, Rafiq Ghaznavi, Mangle, Fatehsingh, Ali Bux | Legend Romance | Krishnatone. Music: Lyrics: |

== M-Z ==
| Title | Director | Cast | Genre | Notes |
|---|---|---|---|---|
| Namak Haram Kon a.k.a. A Bid For The Throne | Madanrai Vakil | Prithviraj Kapoor, Ermiline, Mubarak, Leelavati, Jagdish Sethi, Zaverbhai Qaiser | Costume | Imperial Film Company. |
| Noor Jahan | Ezra Mir | Mazhar Khan, Vimala, Mubarak, Nayampally, Jamshedji, Hadi, Jilloobai, Zaverbhai | Historical Drama | Talkie. Imperial Film Company. Music: Joseph David; Lyrics: |
| Pak Daman a.k.a. The Pure | Kanjibhai Rathod | Rampyari, Haider Shah, Yakbal, Vishnu | | Krishnatone. |
| Raj Tilak | Madanrai Vakil | Mazhar Khan, Ermeline, Mehboob Khan, Rustam Irani, Elizer, Gohar | Costume | Imperial Film Company. |
| Romantic Prince a.k. Meri Jaan | Prafulla Ghosh | Master Vithal, Zubeida, Yakub, Mehboob Khan, Sankatha Prasad | | Sagar Movietone. Silent film. |
| Roop Sundari a.k.a. Wages of Sin | | Sultana, Shahzadi, Zubeida | | Mysore Pictures Corporation. Silent Film |
| Samaj Ka Shikar | M. Gidwani | Patience Cooper, Gul Hamid, Master Mohan, Sharifa | Social | Madan Theatres Ltd. |
| Satyawadi Raja Harishchandra | J. J. Madan | Jehanara Kajjan, Mohammed Nawab, Patience Cooper, Sharifa, | Mythology | Madan Theatres Ltd. Music: Lyrics: |
| Sea Goddess a.k.a. Dariani Devangana | Dhirubhai Desai | Padma Devi, Zebunissa, Chandra Rao Kadam, Pawar, Ata Mohammed | Fantasy | Saroj Film Company. Silent |
| Shakuntala 1 | J. J. Madan | Master Nissar, Jehanara Kajjan, Shehla, Nawab, Sharifa | Mythology | Talkie. Madan Theatres Ltd. Music: Brijlal Sharma; Lyrics: |
| Shakuntala 2 | M. Bhavnani | Zebunissa, Ashraf Khan, Zahiruddin, A. P. Kapoor, Najju Begum, Ranibala, Prabhashankar, Dinkar Bidkar | Mythology | Talkie. Saroj Movietone. Music: Lyrics: A. P. Kapoor |
| Sher-E-Jawan a.k.a. Dashing Youth | Ramakant, Gharekhan | Haider Shah, Rampyari, Charlie, Madhukar Gupte, Ghulam Hussain | | Krishna Film Company. Silent film. |
| Shirin Farhad | J. J. Madan | Master Nissar, Jehanara Kajjan, Mohamed Hussain, Master Mohan, Sharifa, Abdul Rehman Kabuli | Legend Romance | Talkie. Madan Theatres Ltd. Music: Brijlal Varma; Lyrics: Agha Hashar Kashmiri |
| Shuri Sinha a.k.a. Lioness | Prafulla Ghosh | Ram Pyari, Haider Shah, Rafiq Ghaznavi, Miss Sardar | | Krishna Film Company. Silent Film. |
| Third Wife | | | Social | Madan Theatres Ltd. |
| Toofan | Bhagwati Mishra | Prithviraj Kapoor, Ermeline, Fali Merchant | | Sagar Movietone. |
| Toofani Taruni | Bhagwati Prasad Mishra | Yakub, Ermeline, Jal Merchant, Laxmi | Action | Sagar Film Company. |
| Trapped a.k.a. Farebi Jaal | M. Bhavnani | Durga Khote, Jal Khambata, Enakshi Rama Rau, Master Vasant, Sushila, Annapurna, Talpade | Social | Talkie. Indian Art Productions. Music: Lyrics: Vasant Amrit |
| Veer Abhimanyu | Prafulla Ghosh | Zubeida, Yakub, Jal Merchant, Baburao Sansare, Mehboob Khan, Sankatha Prasad, Jilloobai | Mythology | Sagar Movietone. Music: S. P. Rane |
