= List of Hindi films of 1935 =

This is a list of films produced by the Bollywood film industry based in Mumbai in 1935.

== A ==
Title	Director	Cast	Genre	Notes
After the Earthquake a.k.a. Inquilab	Debaki Bose	Durga Khote, K. C. Dey, Prithviraj Kapoor, Molina, Nawab, Nirmal Bannerjee, Syed Mohammed, Kidar Sharma, Siddiqui, Mehra, Surama, Master Raj Kapoor	Social	New Theatres. Music: R. C. Boral. Lyrics: Kidar Sharma.
Ahe Mazluman	N. G. Bulchandani	Roshanara, Indubala, Azmat Begum, Bibijan, A. R. Kabuli, Damodar, Rajeshwari, R. P. Kapoor, Dhumi Khan, Kailash S. N. Bannerjee	Costume	New Tone Films. Music: M. Hussain.
Al Hilal a.k.a. Judgement Oof Allah	Mehboob Khan	Kumar, Indira, Yakub, Sitara Devi, Kayam Ali, Razak, Asooji, Azurie, Wallace	Costume drama	Sagar Movietone. Mehboob Khan's directorial debut. Music: Pransukh Nayak. Lyrics: Munshi Ehsan Lucknowi.
Alladin II a.k.a. Aaj Ka Alladin	Ninu Majumdar	Harishchandra, Ranjit, Udwadia, Noorjahan, Amritlal Nagar, Hanumant Rao	Fantasy	Honey Talkies. Music: Ninu Majumdar. Lyrics: Dhaniram Prem.
Anarkali	R. S. Chowdhary	D. Billimoria, Sulochana Asooji, Jilloobai, Baba Vyas, Chanda	Legend	Imperial Film Co. Music: Annasaheb Mainkar.
Apradhi	Gunjal	Ram Pyari, Brijmala, Madhav Kale, Kamlabai Barodekar, Amritlal Nagar, B. Sohani	Social	Ambika Movietone. Music: Ganga Prasad Pathak.
Apradhi Abla	F. R. Irani	Yusuf Effendi, Rose, Narmada Shankar, Ghulam Mustafa, Violet, Ghulam Hussain	Social	Madan Theatres Ltd. Music: Chhailaram Solanki. Lyrics: Munshi Dil.
Asmat Ka Moti a.k.a. Chirag-e-Arab	Fram Sethna	Patience Cooper, Mohan, Surajram, Maneklal, Bashirjan, Gopal	Fantasy	Pioneer Films Company. Music: Motilal Nayak.
Azad Abla	A. P. Kapoor	Ram Pyari, Sitara Devi, Kashinath, Maruti Rao, Mane	Costume	
Azadi	R. Sharma	Vijay Kumar, Ashalata, Sorabji Kerewala, Bhai Chhaila, Naaz Banu, S. D. K. Darpan, Nurjahan	Social	Shakti Movietone Music

== B-C ==
Title	Director	Cast	Genre	Notes
Bahadur Beti	A. R. Kabuli	Shakuntala, Ashraf Khan, Kamlabai, Laxmi, A. R. Kabuli, Master Chonkar	Action	Kumar Movies
Bahare Sulemani	J. P. Advani	Zebunisa, Master Nissar, Gulab, Prabha Shankar, Bibijan, Jani Babu	Costume	Saroj Movietone. Lyrics: Pandit Lalitprasad Akhtar.
Bahen Ka Prem	J. K. Nanda	Padma Devi, Rafiqe Ghaznavi, Zohrabai, Lakshmi Narayan, Sultana, Sadiq, Azurie	Social	Prosperity Films. Music: Rafiqe Ghaznavi.
Bal Hatya	Ram Daryani	Shanta Kumari, Benjamin, Yasmin, Dadabhai Sarkari, Firoze Dastur, Gope	Costume action	Eastern Arts. Music: Master Madhavlal. Lyrics: Gauri Shankarlal Akhtar.
Balidan	Prafulla Roy	Ahindra Choudhury, Indubala, Dadabhai Sarkari, Lila, Devbala, R. P. Kapoor	Social	Bharat Lakshmi Pictures. Music: Nagardas Nayak.
Bambai Ki Sethani	Rasik Bhatt	Rajkumari, Shirin, Gulab, Jayant, Lallubhai Nayak, Umakant, Ismail	Social	Prakash Pictures. Music: Lallubhai.
Barrister's Wife	Chandulal Shah	Gohar Mamajiwala, E. Billimoria, Ishwarlal, Bhupatrai, Shanta, Khatoon, Keki Adjania, Charlie, Dixit, Ram Apte, Raja Sandow	Social drama	Ranjit Studios. Music: Banne Khan, Rewashankar. Lyrics: Narayan Prasad Betaab.
Bharat Ki Beti	Premankur Atorthy	Rattan Bai, Gul Hamid, Yasmin, Kamlabai, Amirbai Karnataki, Sarojini, Hari Shivdasani	Social	Eastern Arts. Music: Zhande Khan.
Bhikharan	Premankur Atorthy	Rattan Bai, Master Vinayak, Pramila, Firoza begum, Raja Pandit, I. A. Hafisji, Gundopant Walavalkar, Pawar	Social	Kolhapur Cinetone. Music: H. C. Bali.
Bhool Ka Bhog a.k.a. Irony Of Fate	T. G. Lalwani	Padmavati Shaligram, Nandu Khote, Hamida Banu, P. R. Joshi, Ranibala, Wamanrao, G. Anant, Mehar Sultana	Social	Rajputana Films. Music: K. R. Gore.
Bidrohi	Dhirendranath Ganguly	Gul Hamid, Mazhar Khan, Indubala, Sultana, Lalit Mitra, Anupam Ghatak, Purnima Devi, Jyotsana Gupta, Ahindra Chowdhary, S. D. Burman	Social drama	East India Film Company. Music: Dhiren Ganguly.
Birbal Ke Beti	Nanubhai Vakil	Zubeida, Mansoor, Gulab, Hadi, Yusuf, Dinkar, Bhai Desa	Social	Mahalaxmi Cine. Music: Lalchand Falak.
Blood Feud a.k.a. Josh-E-Intaqam	Prafulla Roy	Prithviraj Kapoor, Molina, Yakub, Mubarak, Kamla, Jagdish, Hiralal		New India Films. Music: Hari Prasanna Das.
Bombay Mail	R. P. Bhatt	Rajkumari, Jayant, Lallubhai Nayak, Panna, Raja Babu, Umakant, S. Nazir, Ismail	Action	Prakash Pictures. Music: Lallubhai Nayak. Lyrics: Pandit Anuj.
Bombshell	Dinkar Rao, Ishwarlal	Khursheed, Yashwant Dave, Ishwarlal, Mohammed Hadi, Laxmi, Joshi	Action	Mahalaxmi Cine. Music: Dinkar Rao.
Chandrasena	V. Shantaram	Nalini Tarkhud, Sureshbabu Mane, Buwa Sahib, Rajni, Shanta	Devotional	Prabhat Film Company. Music: Keshav Rao Bhole. Lyrics: K. Narayan Kale.
Chin Ka Sahukar	Chunilal Parekh	Yashwant Dave, Kamla, Dalpat, Bachcha, Dhulia	Costume	Subhash Films. Music: Damodar Sharma.
Chirag-E-Husn	G. K. Mehta	Khursheed, Bhai Desa, Mumtaz, Gulab, G. N. Joshi	Action	
College Girl	Jayant Desai	Madhuri, Ishwarlal Keki Adjania, Sheela Devi, Shanta, Raja Sandow, Khatoon, Ghory, Dixit, Charlie, Ram Apte	Social	Music: Banne Khan, Rewashankar. Lyrics: Narayan Prasad Betaab.

== D ==
Title	Director	Cast	Genre	Notes
Daku Ka Ladka	Charu Roy	Radharani, Indubala, Kamla Devi, Mira Dutta, Anwaribai, R. P. Kapoor, Master Gama, Raziuddin	Costume	Bharat Lakshmi Pictures. Music: Nagardas Nayak. Lyrics: Pandit Bhushan.
Dard-E-Ulfat	Dhirubhai Desai	Heera Kumari, Leela, Miss Iqbal, Madhukar Gupte, Ata Mohammed, Aarif Khan, Ram T. Hira	Action	Swastik Pics. Music: R. T. Hira. Lyrics: Aarif Khan.
Delhi Express	Madan Rai Vakil	Mohan, Sardar Akhtar, Gulam Farid, Zohrabai, S. L. Bhalla, H. R. Bhalla	Action	Roshanara. Music: H. R. Bhalla.
Delhi Ka Thug	Dhirubhai Desai	Ansuya, Ashiq Hussain, Nazir, Fazlu, Himmatlal, Samson, Anwaribai	Action	Vishnu Cine. Music: Munshi Javed. Lyrics: Ashiq Hussain.
Desh Dasi	Chandulal Shah	Gohar Mamajiwala, E. Billimoria, Ishwarlal, Shanta, Ram Apte, Charlie, Ghory, Dixit, Khatoon, Raja Sandow, Baby Bhanumathi	Social	Ranjit Movietone. Music: G. G. Gogate.
Desh Deepak	JBH Wadia	Fearless Nadia, John Cawas, Sardar Mansur, Husn Bano, Boman Shroff, Sharifa, Gulshan, Sayani Atish, Jaidev, Master Mohammed, Bismillah, S. L. Puri, Iqbal	Action	Wadia Movietone. Music: Master Mohammed. Lyrics: Joseph David.
Devdas	P.C. Barua	K. L. Saigal, Jumuna, Pahari Sanyal, Rajkumari, K. C. Dey, Nemo, Sitara	Romantic drama	New Theatres. Music: Timir Baran. Lyrics: Kidar Sharma.
Dharm Ki Devi	Hiren Bose	Kumar, Sardar Akhtar, Firoze Dastur, Yasmin, Gope, Rafiqe Ghaznavi, Anant Marathe, Anil Biswas, Hari Shivdasani		Eastern Arts. First complete film of Anil Biswas as MD. Music: Anil Biswas. Lyrics: Gauri Shankarlal Akhtar.
Dharmatma	V. Shantaram	Bal Gandharva, Ratnaprabha, Chandra Mohan, Vasanti, Chhotu, Vasant Desai, Keshav Narayan Kale, Buwa Saheb	Biopic Drama	Prabhat Film Company. Music: Master Krishnarao. Lyrics: Narottam Vyas.
Dhoop Chhaon	Nitin Bose	Pahari Sanyal, Uma Shashi, Sardar Akhtar, Bikram Kapoor, K. C. Dey, Kidar Sharma, Trilok Kapoor, Shyam Laha, Devbala, Indu Mukherji, Nawab	Social drama	New Theatres. K. C. Dey song: "Baba Mann Ki Aankhein Khol". Music: R. C. Boral, Pankaj Mullick. Lyrics: Pandit Sudarshan.
Dhuwandhar	Sukumar Chatterjee	Leela Chitnis, Vishnu Dayal Bhargava, Warerkar, Yashwant Dave, S. N. Bannerjee, Nana Palsikar, Gaya Prasad, Mira Devi, Vasant Thengdi, Shivrani Ghosh, Kantilal	Social	Adarsh Chitra. Music: Shoolpani Mukherjee. Lyrics: Dwarka Prasad Mishra.
Dil Ki Pyas	Sorab Kerawala, J. J. Madan	Mukhtar Begum, Bal Gandharva, S. Kerawala, Patience Cooper, Jahanara Kajjan, Fida Hussain, Surajram, Gama	Social	Bharat Lakshmi Pictures. Music: Nagar Das Nayak. Lyrics: Agha Hashr Kashmiri.
Diljani	Charu Roy	Leela, Kamla, Fida Hussain, Gama, Devbal, Sheela	Costume	Bharat Lakshmi Pictures. Music: Nagar Das Nayak. Lyrics: Ramdas Azad.
Divine Sacrifice a.k.a. Keemti Qurbani	B. N. Rao	Rose, Ghulam Hussain, Rajkumari, Mustafa Hussain, Amir Ali, Gama, Bashirjan, Agha Jan Kashmiri, Sheela, Pahelwan, Abbas	Action	Shankar Films, Manohar. Music: Motilal Nayak.
Do Ghadi Ki Mauj	Homi Master	D. Billimoria, Sulochana (Ruby Myers), Jamshedji, Jilloobai, Syed Ahmed, Lalita, Ghulam Rasool, Gani, Baby Mayuri	Social	Imperial Films. Music: Munshi Zameer.
Dr. Madhurika a.k.a. Modern Wife	Sarvottam Badami	Motilal, Sabita Devi, Padma Shaligram, Bhudo Advani, Pande, Baby Indira, Pesi Patel, Gulzar	Social family drama	Sagar Movietone. Music: Pransukh Nayak, Ashok Ghosh. Lyrics: Prof. Waqif.

== E-J ==
Title	Director	Cast	Genre	Notes
Farebi Duniya	J. P. Advani	Zebunissa, Sardar Akhtar, Navin Yagnik, Mohini, Bhawanilal, Ganpat Bakre, Bibijan	Social	Golden Eagle. Music: Sunder Das Bhatia, A. C. Biswas.
Fashionable India	Mohan Sinha	Pushpa, Jeevan, Sushila, Badri Prasad, Shyam Sunder, Wadilal, Dhanjit Shah, Gulab, R. D. Shukla, Fakir Mohammed, B. L. Ganju	Social	Krishna Film. Music: Badri Prasad, Master Madhavlal Damodar. Lyrics: Badri Prasad.
Gaibi Gola	Vithaldas Panchotia	Khalil, Sheela Devi, Vithaldas, Baby Noor Jehan	Fantasy	Madan Theatres. Music: J. A. Khan.
Ghar Jamai	Homi Master	Heera, Ghulam Rasool, Ali Miya, Jumuna, Syed Ali, Jamshedji, Amoo, Baby Noor Jehan	Social comedy	Premier Cinestone. Lyrics: Munshi Sagar Hussain.
Gulshan-E-Alam	Nanubhai Vakil	Zubeida, Sardar Mansur, Shahzadi, Yusuf Effendi, Bhai Desa, Dinkar	Costume	Mahalaxmi Cine. Music: Dinkar S. Bidkar. Lyrics: Lalchand Falak.
Himmat-E-Marda a.k.a. Lord of the Jungle	G. P. Pawar	Lalita Pawar, Bhagwan, Chandra Rao, Kadam, Shyam Rao, G. P. Pawar	Action	Chandra Art. Music: Amir Husein Khan. Lyrics: Samir.
Hind Kesari	Homi Wadia	Husn Bano, Sardar Mansur, Dilawar, Gulshan, Jal Khambata, E. Tarapoe	Action	Wadia Movietone. Music: Master Mohammed. Lyrics: Joseph David.
Hunterwali a.k.a. The Lady With the Whip	Homi Wadia	Fearless Nadia, John Cawas, Boman Shroff, Sharifa, Gulshan, Sayani Atish, Jaidev, Master Mohammed	Action	Wadia Movietone. Music: Master Mohammed. Lyrics: Joseph David.
Ishrat Ki Maut a.k.a. 100 Lashes	M. Murtaza	Vasantrao Pehalwan, Menaka, Dilara		
Jadui Danda a.k.a. Magic Wand	Dwarka Khosla	Shiraz, Champa, Gulbanu, Razak, Kazi, Pandit, Dalpatram, Adam Sandow, Bibijan	Fantasy	Paramount Studio
Jahanara	F. R. Irani	Jahanara Kajjan, Yusuf Effendi, Violet Cooper, Sheela, Rajkumari, Pirjan, Jagdish Sethi, Mustafa, Pearl	Social	Madan Theatres. Music: Chhailaram Solanki.
Jane Alam a.k.a. Jan-E-Alam Anjumanara	M. R. Kapoor	Master Vithal, Putlinai, Athavale, Miss Pokhraj, P. Varne, Azurie, Nurjahan	Historical	B. K. Dave Brothers. Music: Dinkar S. Bidkar.
Jawani Ka Nasha	F. R. Irani	Patience Cooper, Khalil, Akhtaribai Faizabadi (Begum Akhtar), Qaiser, Agha Jani	Social	Madan Theatres Ltd. Music: Chhailaram Solanki. Lyrics: Agha Hashr Kashmiri.
Jawani Ki Hawa	Franz Osten	Devika Rani, Najmul Hussain, Chandraprabha, J. S. Kasshyap, P. F. Pithawal, Kamta Prasad, Bhaskar Dev, Talpade, Azurie, Sunita Devi, Solanki, Khosla, Mukherjee, Masiha	Romantic crime thriller	Bombay Talkies. First film of Saraswati Devi as MD. Music: Saraswati Devi, Najmul Hussain, Bare Agha. Lyrics: J. S. Kashyap, Najmul Hussain, Bare Agha, Dhansukhlal K. Mehta.
Jeewan Natak a.k.a. Life Is A Stage	Debaki Bose	Durga Khote, Ram Piari, Alaknanda, Phelwan, Nand Kishore, Trikamlal, Nirmal Bannerjee, Gulam Jilani Sham, Shivrani	Drama	Jayant Pics. Music: Harish Chandra Bali. Lyrics: Narottam Vyas.
Josh-e-Jawani	Dwarka Khosla	Mohini, Dewaskar, Mohammed Ishaq, Haridas, Manohar Ghatwai	Costume	Kala Kinetone
Jung Bahadur	M. D. Bhavnani	Shivrani, Nayanpalli, Fatty Prasad, Baby Nargis, S. L. Puri, Gyani	Action	Bhavnani Productions. Music: G. Devaskar.

== K-L ==
Title	Director	Cast	Genre	Notes
Kala Swar	Acharya, W. Garcher	Navinchandra, Ermiline, Ghulam Mohammed, S. Nazir, Tarabai, Yashwant Dave, Kamlabai, Usha Devi, Baby Noor Jehan, Goswami, Haridas	Costume	Jawahir Cine
Kalia Mardan	Dadasaheb Nimbalkar	Leela, Indubala, Madhukar, Chitnis, Vasant, Ebrahim, Ram Badre, S. Bhosle	Devotional	Kolhapur Cine. Music: Chandekar.
Kali Waghan a.k.a. Wild Tigress	R. N. Vaidya	Nandram, Shakuntala, Kamla, Prabha Shankar, Vijaya, Kaneez	Costume	Kumar Movietone
Kalkoot a.k.a. Kismet Ki Bhool	D. K. Kale	Leela, Baburao Pendharkar, Nayampalli, Heera Kumari, Omkar Devaskar, Vatsala, Lobo, P. R. Joshi, Sushila, K. Agarwal	Social	Sudha Pictures. Music: Prof. Lahanu, S. Manjrekar.
Kamroo Desh Ki Kamini	A. R. Kabuli	Sultana, Kamalabai, Ashraf Khan, Swaroop Rani, Master Chonker, Kabuli, Kaneez	Fantasy	Kumar Movietone
Karwan-E-Hayat	Premankur Atorthy, Hemchandra Chunder	K. L. Saigal, Molina, Pahari Sanyal, Rajkumari, Rattan Bai, Shyama Zutshi, Hamid, Siddiqi, Kapoor, Rana	Costume action adventure	New Theatres. Music: M. K. Bhattacharya, R. C. Boral. Lyrics: Hakeem Ahmad Shuja Pasha.
Karwane Husn	Choudhary M. Rafi	Nazir, Shahzadi, Ansari, Hadi, Miss Zohrajan, Qamar	Costume	Kanwal Movie. Music: V. B. Ganguly.
Keemti Aansoo	Chandulal Shah	Gohar, E. Billimoria, Ishwarlal, Khatoon, Charubala, Ram Apte, Bhanumathi	Family melodrama	Ranjit Movietone. Music: Banne Khan, Rewashankar Marwari. Lyrics: Narayan Prasad Betaab.
Khoon Ka Khoon a.k.a. Hamlet	Sohrab Modi	Sohrab Modi, Naseem Banu, E. Tarapore, Ghulam Hussain, Fazal Karim, Obali Mai, Ghulam Mohiyudin, Shamshadbai, Gauhar, B. Pawar	Drama	Stage Films. Music: Kanhaiya Pawar.
Qatil Katar	G. P. Pawar	Lalita Pawar, Bhagwan, Munshi Jilani Shyam, Alaknanda, Bulbule	Action	Victory Pictures. Music: Shanti Kumar Desai. Lyrics: Munshi Jilani Shyam.
Qatl-e-Aam	Rele, Arolkar	Pramila, Suresh, G. R. Sandow, Gangoobai, Manjrekar, Azurie	Costume action	Maneka Movie. Lyrics: Anand Kumar.
Khuni Khanjar	K. B. Desai, R. N. Vaidya	Shiraz, Kashmira Devi, Vaidya, Champa, Malika, Bacha, Adam Sandow, Bibijan	Costume action	Paramount Film Company. Music: Damodar Sharma.
Krishna Shishtai	Mama Mane	Vijaya Devi, Menaka, Godbole, Ved Pathak, Vasantrao Pehalwan, Vinay, Niphadkar, Jawadekar	Devotional	Saraswati
Kunwari Ya Vidhwa	Pandit Sudarshan, Prafulla Roy	Indubala, Zarina, Khatoon, A. R. Kabuli, Maya Devi, Shahzadi, R. P. Kapoor, Kamla, Fida Hussain	Social	Bharat Laxmi Pictures. Music: Nagardas Nayak.
Laheri Jawan	Shanti Dave	Navinchandra, Mehtab, Shivrani Ghosh, Pawar, Haribhai, Shahzadi	Costume	Shanti Cine. Music: Madhavlal Master. Lyrics: Munshi Shyam.
Lal Cheetah	Dhirubhai Desai	Ashiq Hussein, Yakub, Shahzadi, Ansuya, Mohanlal, Jagannath, Lallubhai Nayak, Fazlu, Ata Mohamed	Costume	Vishnu Cine. Music: Lallubhai Nayak.
Lal Chitthi	Niranjan Bharadwaj	Rajkumari, Alaknanda, Jayant, Ramzan Khan, Panna, Lallo Bhai, Jehangir, Tarabai, J. M. Kaul, Esmail	Social	Prakash Pictures. Music: Lallubhai Nayak.

== M-N ==
Title	Director	Cast	Genre	Notes
Madan Manjari	Chhotubhai Desai	Miss Zohra Jaan, Manohar Ghatwai, Raja Babu, Sunder Rao	Fantasy	Kala Kinetone. Music: Dhaniram Prem.
Magic Horse	Babubhai Jani, Kanu Shukla, Raja Yagnik	Mehtab, Navinchandra, Marutirao, Alaknanda, Bachchu, Haridas, Munshi Jilani Shyam, Trikamlal	Fantasy	Jayant Pics. Music: Shanti Kumar Desai. Lyrics: Munshi Jilani Shyam.
Majnu	Roop K. Shorey	Shyama Zutshi, Harold Lewis (Majnu), Mukhtiar Begum, Mattu, Khan Mastana, Sultan Beg, Hukumsingh, Majnu, Kamla	Social	Kamla Movies. Music: Ghulam Haider. Lyrics: Wali Saheb.
Mard-E-Maidan	Anant Desai	Benjamin, Gulzar, Kanta, Azurie, Napurkar, M. Tipnis	Costume	Jagannath Cine. Music: Ratnakar. Lyrics: Nashatar Luckhnavi.
Maut Ka Toofan	Henry Dargwitch	Zebunissa, Sultana, Goswami, Gulzar, Ghanekar, F. Bhutt, Kanta, Chande	Social	All India Movie. Music: Abdul Karim Khan. Lyrics: Nashatar Luckhnavi.
Mera Pyara	Ezra Mir	Jahanara Kajjan, Jagdish Sethi, Akhtar Nawaz, Patience Cooper, Krishnakant, Rajkumari, Vimla	Social	Madan Theatres Ltd. Music: Chhailaram Solanki. Lyrics: Munshi Dil.
Mirza Sahiban	G. R. Sethi	Khursheed, Amir Ali, Inayat Jan, Pervez, Chhailaram, Bhai Desa, Sohanlal, Sarla	Legend folk	Hindmata Cine. Music: Nawab Khan.
Misar Ka Khazana	Rajhans	Master Nissar, Sardar Akhtar, Zebunissa, Prabha Shankar, Shivrani, Sadiq, Ganpat Bakre, Jani Babu, Dulari, Balabhai	Costume	Saroj Movies
Misar Ka Sitara	Minoo Katrak	Ebrahim, Violet Cooper, Shahzadi, Munni Bai, Baby Noor Jehan, Bhim, Parveen, Kantilal, B. Mapla	Costume	Music: Damodar Sharma, Munnibai. Lyrics: Munshi Aasif.
Miss Manorama	Faredoon Irani	Rajkumari, Jahanara Kajjan, Khalil, Ghulam Mustafa, Agha Jani Kashmiri, Pirjan	Social	Tollywood Studio. Music: Brijlal Varma. Lyrics: Munshi Salim.
Mithi Nazar	Harshadrai Mehta	Ram Pyari, Madhav Kale, Bhagwandas, Brijmala, G. P. Pathak, Sohani	Social	Ambika Movietone. Music: Kikubhai Yagnik. Lyrics: Dhaniram Prem.
Modern Girl	B. S. Rajhans	Master Nissar, Zebunissa, Prabha Shankar, Swarup Rani, Balabhai, Bibijan	Social	Saroj Movietone. Music: Sunderdas Bhatia. Lyrics: Prof. Waqif.
Murderer	G. R. Sethi	Gul Hamid, Patience Cooper, Indubala, Mazhar Khan, Lalita, Nirala	Social	East India Film Company. Music: Master Madhavl Damodar.
Naganand	Y. V. Rao	Leelabai, C. Ramachandra (Chitalkar), Wamanrao Sadolikar, Tarabai, Ajambai, Paragaonkar, Thacker		Music: Wamanrao Sadolikar. Lyrics: Salim Punawala.
Navjeevan	M. D. Bhavnani	Khatoon, Ameena, W. M. Khan, Bhudo Advani, Munnibai, S. N. Parashar, Gyani, S. L. Puri, Abu Bakar	Social	Ajanta Cinetone. Music: W. Kaufmann. Lyrics: Munshi Premchand.
Naya Zamana	Homi Master	Ghulam Mohammed, Jumuna, Jamshedji, Ghulam Rasool, Heera, Jilloobai, Tahami Chemist, Syed Ahmed	Social	Premier Films. Music: Khansaheb, Jamshedji.
Neela	B. Khandekar	Rekha, Abhyankar, Dixit, Janardhan, Mangala, Surve, Roshanara Begum	Social	Veena Pictures. Music: B. R. Deodhar.
Nigah-E-Nafrat a.k.a. Orphans of the Storm	Master Vinayak	Shobhana Samarth, Master Vinayak, Baburao Pendharkar, Bal Dhavale, Gundopant Walavalkar, Manohar Mainkar, Indira Wadkar	Social	Kolhapur Cinetone. First film of Shobhana Samarth as actress, Vinayak as director. Music: Gundopant Walavalkar.
Nirdoshi Abla	V. Ghaswala	Kashinath, Aziz, Gulzar, Bhagwandas, Miss Iqbal, Mayuri, Gangaram	Social	Novelty Cine. Music: Amir Sahib.
Noor-e-Vatan	Jayant Desai	E. Billimoria, Ishwarlal, Madhuri, Dixit, Khatoon, Charlie, Ghory, Shanta, Ram Apte, Keki Adajania	Costume	Ranjit Studios. Music: Banne Khan, Rewashanker. Lyrics: Narayan Prasad Betaab.
Noore Yaman	JBH Wadia	Fearless Nadia, Sardar Mansur, Boman Shroff, Husn Banu, Firoza Begum, Firoze Dastur, Jal Khambatta, Master Mohammed, Sharifa, Sayani Atish, Bismillah	Costume	Wadia Movietone. Music: Master Mohammed. Lyrics: Joseph David.

== P-R ==
Title	Director	Cast	Genre	Notes
Pardesi Saiyan	Baburao Patel	Mubarak, Padma Devi, Shirin, Azurie, Nandu Khote, Raja Pandit, Yasmin, Surve, Sophia, Bhaskar		Gandharv Cine. Music: Dinkar Rao. Lyrics: Pandit Indra.
Payam-E-Ulfat	A. R. Kabuli, Soni	Baburao, Krishna Kumari, Ashraf, Tara Devi, Violet Cooper, Kamla, Chonker, A. R. Kabuli	Action	Kumar Movies
Preet Ki Reet	Baburao Apte	Heerabai, Kamlabai, Kanti, Madhukar, Bhim, Himmat Lal	Social	Bharat K Movietone. Music: Kantilal Pacchigar. Lyrics: Dhaniram Prem.
Prem Ki Ragini	Faredoon Irani	Yusuf Effendi, Jahanara Kajjan, Jagdish Sethi, Surajram, Cawasji	Social	Madan Theatres Ltd. Music: Brij Lal Verma.
Prem Pujari	Rafiqe Ghaznavi	Alaknanda, Rafiqe Ghaznavi, Miss Zohrajan, Bachchu, Esmail, Mumtaz	Social	Jayant Pics. Music: Rafiqe Ghaznavi. Lyrics: Munshi Jilani Sham.
Pujarini a.k.a. Dancer of the Temple	Nandlal Jaswantlal	D. Billimoria, Sulochana (Ruby Myers), Jamshedji, Jilloobai, Ghulam Rasool, Jamuna, Baba Vyas, Lakshmi, Syed Ahmed	Costume drama	Imperial Film Company. Music: Pransukh Naik.
Pyar Ki Maar	A. P. Kapoor	Gohar Karnataki, Nayampalli, Bibbo, Khatoon, Navin Yagnik, Bhudo Advani, A. P. Kapoor, Parashar, Vidya Devi, Abu Bakar	Costume	Ajanta Cinetone. Music: B. S. Hoogan. Lyrics: A. Banarasi.
Pyara Dushman	R. G. Torney, Amir Ali	Dilip (Nazir), Menaka, Ramesh, Sundarabai, Rashid, Vasantrao Pehalwan	Action	Sikander Cinetone. Music: Ram Pathak.
Raat Ki Baat	Gunjal	Ghulam Mohammed, Dulari, Heerabai, Jilloobai, Ghulam Rasool, Abdul, Lalita, Syed Ahmed, Baba Vyas	Costume	Premier Cine. Music: Balram. Lyrics: Munshi Manjar.
Raat Ki Rani	Raja Sandow	Ishwarlal, Khatoon, Shanta, Azurie, Dixit, Ghory, Indira, Charlie, Raja Sandow	Social	Ranjit Studios. Music: Ganga Prasad Pathak, Rewashanker. Lyrics: Narayan Prasad Betaab.
Raj Tarang	M. R. Kapoor	Master Vithal, Ermeline, Alaknanda, Azurie, Gulzar, Varne, Putli, Salvi	Action drama	B. K. Dave Bros. Music: Master Basant Mansoor.
Raj Mukut	Govindrao Tembe	Ameena, G. Tembe, K. Vasudev, Sundari, Vinayak Kale, Joshi	Costume	Shalini Cinetone. Music: G. Tembe. Lyrics: Pandit Shiv Kumar.
Rang Bhoomi	N. G. Deware	Jamuna, Ebrahim, Ragini, Vaidya, Begum Fatima, Mirajkar	Social	Digweer Cine. Music: Master Ratnakar. Lyrics: Dhaniram Prem.
Rangila Nawab	N. Majumdar	Master Vithal, Dinkar Rao, D. S. Salvi, Nurjahan, Azurie, Hanumant Rao, P. Varne	Social	B. K. Dave Bros. Music: Dinkar.
Rashida	Ezra Mir	Yusuf Effendi, Jahanara Kajjan, Mohammed Hussain, Jagdish Sethi, Mahajabeen, Qadir, Kamlabai, Sheela	Social	Madan Theatres Ltd. Music: Chhailaram Solanki. Lyrics: Agha Hashar Kashmiri.
Ratan Manjari	J. Arasthani	Shankar Rao Khatu, Shantaram, Samarth, Putli, Dongre, Raja Sandow, Azurie	Fantasy	K. B. Dave Bros. Music: Basant Mansoor.
Registan Ki Rani a.k.a. Desert Queen	A. P. Kapoor	Jal, Sitara Devi, Krishna Kumari Sr, Kamla, Soni, Khatoon, Abu Bakar, Lakshmi, Sudhir Baburao	Costume	Kumar Movie. Music: B. S. Hoogan.

== S ==
Title	Director	Cast	Genre	Notes
Sajiv Murti	S, F, Hsnain	Vijay Kumar, Ashalata, Kusum, Roshanara, Bhai Chhaila, Nirmal, H. P. Sharma, S. D. K. Darpan	Social	Shakti Movies. Music: Bhai Chhailaram Solanki.
Sati Sulochana	Mamasaheb Shinde	Indubala, Godbole, S. Patil, Kalawati, Gole, Chandrika	Devotional	Shri Godavri Cinetone. Music: B. Ketkar. Lyrics: Sapondev Choudhary.
Sati Toral	Chunilal Parekh	Yashwant Dave, Alaknanda, Ashalata, Bhavani Shanker, Kusum, Noorjahan, B. S. Hoogan	Devotional	Shakti Movies. Music: Chhailaram Solanki. Lyrics: Munshi Jilani Sham.
Selima	Modhu Bose	Gul Hamid, Radhabai, Mazhar Khan, Madhavi, Nand Kishore, Indubala, Ghulam Rasool, Hasandin, Pehalwan, S. D. Burman	Costume	East India Film Company
Shadi Ki Raat	M. D. Bhavnani	Vijay Kumar, Shivrani Ghosh, S. L. Puri, Nayampally, Gyani, Shrifa, Fatty Prasad, Omkar Devaskar, Baby Nargis	Social	Bhavnani Productions. Music: Devaskar. Lyrics: Narottam Vyas.
Shah Behram	J. P. Advani	Zebunissa, Master Nissar, Sardar Akhtar, Dulari, Jani Babu, Bibijan	Costume action	Saroj Movies. Music: Master Bast Mansur. Lyrics: Narayan Prasad Betab.
Shahi Lutera	A. R. Kabuli	Kamla, A. R. Kabuli, Ameena, Sunita Devi, Mumtaz Begum, Azurie, Ashraf Khan, Sadiq Ali, A. N. Khan, Pasha	Costume action	Ajit Movietone. Music: Gayasudin.
Shamshir-E-Arab	Niranjan Bhardawaj	Rajkumari, Shirin, Jayant, Mohini, Umakant, Ismail, Jal Writer, Lallubhai, M. Zahur	Costume	Prakash Pictures. Music: Lallubhai Nayak. Lyrics: Munshi Zameer.
Sher Dil Aurat a.k.a. Free Souls	A. P. Kapoor	P. Jairaj, Khatoon, Ameena, W. M. Khan, Bhudo Adwani, Lalita, Navin Yagnik, Tarabai, S. L. Puri, A. S. Gyani, Baby Nargis	Costume	Ajanta Cinetone. Music: B. S. Hoogan. Lyrics: Munshi Premchand.
Shri Satyanarayan	Dhrupad Roy	Leela Chitnis, Indubala, Ranjana, Godbole, Pushpa, Ramkrishna, Ved Pathak, Chaube	Devotional	Model Pics. Music: Somnath Patpat. Lyrics: Radheshyam.
Silver King	Chimanlal Luhar	Motilal, Sabita Devi, Yakub, Tarabai, Asooji, Jamoo Patel	Action	Sagar Film. Music: Pransukh Nayak.
Sone Ka Shaher a.k.a. Golden City	A. P. Kapoor	Jal Merchant, Krishna Kumari, Baburao, Kamala, Sagar, Laxmi, Abu Bakar, Mustafa	Action	Kumar Movietone. Music: B. S. Hoogan.
Step Mother	S. D. Kerawala	Gul Hamid, Radharani, Sultana, Indubala, Mazhar Khan, Pahelwan	Social	East India Film Co. Music: Mushtaq Husain.
Stree Dharma	C. M. Rafi	Nazir, Mumtaz, Ansari, Agha, Azurie, Hadi, Mehta, G. N. Butt, Baby Noor Jehan	Social	Kanwal Movies. Music: B. Ganguly.
Swarg Ki Seedhi	A. R. Kardar	Prithviraj Kapoor, Khursheed, Gyan Singh, Khadim, Umra Zia	Social	National movie. Music: Ghulam Haider.

== T-Z ==
Title	Director	Cast	Genre	Notes
Talash-E-Haq a.k.a. Search For Truth	C. M. Luhar	Yakub, Ashik Hussain, Kayam Ali, Jaddanbai, A. R. Akhtar, Gulzar Bai, Mehdi Raza, Pesi Patel, Baby Nargis	Social	Sangeet Films. First Hindi film to have a female MD. Music: Jaddanbai.
Taqdeer	Babubhai Jani	Mehtab, Navinchandra, Alaknanda, Bachchu, Haridas, Maruti Rao, Shivrani, Munshi Jilani Shyam	Costume	Jayant Pics. Music: Shantikumar Desai. Lyrics: Munshi Jilani Shyam.
Toofani Tamancha	R. N. Vaidya	Gul Banu, Miss Pokhraj, Shanker, Shiraj	Costume	Paramount. Music: Damodar Sharma.
Triya Charitra	S. F. Hasnain	Roshanara Begum, Hadi, Harprasad, Premi, Kumari	Social	Deena Films. Music: G. Kapoor.
Typist Girl	A. R. Kabuli	Kamla, A. R. Kabuli, Ameena, Sadiq, Shakuntala, Haroon	Social	Ajit Movietone. Music: Giayasuddin.
Usha	Baburao Painter	Ratnaprabha, Govindrao Tembe, Usha Mantri, Karnakar, Sushila Devi, D. Dudhale, Kale, K. Vasudeo	Mythology	Shalini Cinetone. Music: Govindrao Tembe.
Vasant Prabha	Abbas Ali, Mohammed Hussain	Rose, Mustafa, Rajkumari, Shaila, Violet Cooper, Ghulam Hussain, Mohammed Hussain, Agha Jani Kashmiri	Social	Madan Theatres Ltd. Music: Motilal Nayak.
Veer Kumari	Balakrishna Narayan Rao		Costume	Madan Theatres Ltd
Vengeance is Mine a.k.a. Ver Nu Vasulat	Sarvottam Badami	Sabita Devi, Yakub, Kumar, Sitara Devi, Mehboob Khan, Ansari, Mehi Hassan, Padma Shaligram	Social	Sagar Movietone
Wamaq Azra	Tarat Bose	Indira Devi, Trilok Kapoor, Rajkumari, Ghulam Rasool, A. R. Kabuli, Bashir	Legend	Ganesh Movie. Music: Ananth Bose. Lyrics: Nashtar Luckhnavi.
Woh Kaun	A. M. Khan	Navinchandra, Lekhraj, Radha, Yasmin, Ata Mohammed, Vidya Devi, Master Mohammed		Ganesh Movies. Music: Abdul Karim Khan. Lyrics: David.
Yasmin a.k.a. Bewafa Ashq	Hari Shivdasani	Rattanbai, H. Siddiqui, Gope, M. Mirza, Amirbai Karnataki, Hamid, Alexander, D. Manek	Social	Eastern Arts. Music: Chandiram. Lyrics: Gauri Shankarlal Akhtar.
Zingaro	S. N. Bhende	Gulab, Miss Zohrajan, Nayampally, Mohammed Nazir, Mansuri, Pushpa, Takle	Action	Krishna Movietone. Music: Madhavlal Master. Lyrics: S. N. Bhende.
