= List of Hindi films of 1933 =

A list of films produced by the Bollywood film industry based in Mumbai in 1933:

== A ==
Title	Director	Cast	Genre	Notes
Aab-E-Hayat	Krishna Gopal	Kardar, Nazir, Ali Athar, Master Bachcha, A. R. Pehlwan, Nurjahan	Costume	East India Film Company. Music: K. C. Dey
Afzal	M. Bhavnani	Master Nissar, Ameena, Bhudo Advani, A. R. Kabuli, Haseena	Costume	Ajanta Cinetone. Music: B. S. Hoogan; Lyrics: Abdul Rahman Kabuli
Alif Laila	Balwant Bhatt, Shanti Dave	Zohrajan, Nazir, Bashir, Gul Banu, Lallubhai, M. Esmail, Pawar	Fantasy	Royal Cinetone. Music: Kikubhai Yagnik; Lyrics: Pandit Anuj
Alladin And His Wonderful Lamp	J. J. Madan	Rose, Leela, Gulzar, Narbada Shanker, Sheela, Mustafa, A. R. Kabuli	Fantasy	Madan Theatres Ltd. Silent film.
Ankh Ka Nasha	J. J. Madan	Mukhtar Begum, Mohammed Hussain, Jahanara Kajjan, Surajram, Rajkumari, Shaila, Rosy, Sushila, Sorabji	Social	Madan Theatres Ltd. Music: Brijlal Varma; Lyrics:
Aurat Ka Dil	H. R. Soni	P. Jairaj, Tarabai, Mubarak, Sitara Devi, Alaknanda, Shamsudin, Kamlabai	Social	Trilok Cinetone. Music: H. C. Bali
Aurat Ka Pyar	Abdul Rashid Kardar	Gul Hamid, Anwari Bai, Mazhar Khan, Athar, Bachcha, Mukhtar Begum, A. R. Pahelwan	Social	East India Film Company. Music: Mushtaq Ahmed
Awara Shehzada	Master Vithal	Shahu Modak, Salvi, Javdekr, Sundarabai, Vasantrao Pahelwan, Rani	Action Costume	Saraswati Cinetone. Music: Annasaheb Mainkar

== B-D ==
Title	Director	Cast	Genre	Notes
Bhagya Chakra	Haribhai Desai, Baburao Apte			Surya Film Company.
Bhola Shikar	Jayant Desai	E. Billimoria, Mehtab, Ghory, Kamla Devi, Ishwarlal, Kesari, Dixit, Shanta Kumari, Rewashankar	Costume	Ranjit Studios. Music: Jhande Khan; Lyrics: Dhaniram Prem
Bhool Bhulaiya	Jayant Desai	Dixit, Ghory, Kamla Devi, Ishwar, Kesari, Shanta Kumari, Keki Adjania	Comedy	Ranjit Studios. Music: Jhande Khan; Lyrics Dhaniram Prem
Bulbule Punjab	Nanubhai Vakil	Shahu Modak Zubeida, Yakub, Shahzadi, Rewashankar, Shanta Kumari, Ganga Prasad, Yusuf, Dinkar, Pawar	Legend Romance	Mahalaxmi Cinetone. Music: S. P. Rane; Lyrics: Pandit Rane
Chandrahasa	Sarvottam Badami	Kamla Devi, Charlie, Miss Gulzar, Master Bachchu, Khatoon, Mehboob Khan, Asooji, Dinkar, Baburao Sansare	Mythology	Sagar Movietone. Music: S. P. Rane; Lyrics:
Char Darvesh	Prafulla Ghosh	Kanan Devi, Trilok Kapoor, Tulsi Chakravorty, K. Kumar, Radha Bhattacharya, Binoy Goswami, Angurbala, K. Kumar, S. Das	Fantasy	Radha Film Company. Music: Radhacharan Bhattacharya; Lyrics: Pandit J. Mehra
Daku Ki Ladki	M. Gidwani	D. Billimoria, Sulochana (Ruby Myers), Ghulam Mohammed, Lakshmi, Syed Ahmed, Hadi	Costume	Imperial Film Company. Music: Pransukh Nayak
Dhruva	Jyotish Banerji	Patience Cooper, Prabodh, Jehanara Kajjan, Chanda	Mythological	Madan Theatres Ltd. Music: Brijlal Varma
Dorangi Duniya	Pesi Karani	Mushtari, Jamshedji, Ghulam Rasool, Khansaheb, Khalil, Jilloobai, Hadi, Kesari	Social	Imperial Film Company. Music: Pransukh Nayak
Dulari Bibi	Debaki Bose	K. L. Saigal, Molina Devi, Mir Jan	Comedy	Based on Our Wives Short film.

== E-K ==
Title	Director	Cast	Genre	Notes
Ek Din Ka Badshah a.k.a. King For A Day	Rajhans	Sabita Devi, Mazhar Khan, Akhtari Bai, Athar, Indubala, Bachcha, Radharani, A.R. Pahelwan	Historical Drama	East India Film Company. Music: Moti Babu, N. R. Bhattacharya
Hatimtai Part 1	G. R. Sethi	Maruti, Sushila, Badrprasad, Shanta Kumari, Fakir Mohammed, Savitri, Gulab	Fantasy	Bharat Movietone. Music: Madhavlal Master; Lyrics: G. R. Sethi
Hatimtai Part II, III, IV	G. R. Sethi	Maruti, Sushila, Badrprasad, Shanta Kumari, Fakir Mohammed, Savitri, Gulab, Ebrahim, Kamla	Fantasy	Bharat Movietone. Music: Madhavlal Master; Lyrics: G. R. Sethi
Husn Ka Ghulam	J. P. Advani	Gulab, Ashraf Khan, Sadiq, Sardar Begum, Sharifa	Action	Paramount.
Id Ka Chand	A. P. Kapoor	Sardar Begum, Ashraf Khan, Zebunissa, Master Ali Bux, Zahiruddin, Sher Ali	Social	Saroj Movietone. Music: Sunderdas Bhatia; Lyrics: Munshi Abbas Ali, Munshi Shams
Insan Ya Shaitan	M. Gidwani	Ermeline, Jaddanbai, Dixit, Malkani, Bhavnani, Manek, Baby Saraswati	Social	Eastern Art Productions. Music: Chandiram; Lyrics:
Intaqam	J. K. Nanda	Praful Kumar, Sultana, Phool Kumari, Noorjahan		Amar Movietone.
Kala Pahad	Baburao Apte	Gohar Karnataki, Navinchandra, Shivrani Ghosh, Bhim, Kanti	Costume	Sharda Movietone. Music: Lyrics: Dhaniram Prem
Karma	J. L. Freer Hunt	Devika Rani, Himanshu Rai, Ebraham Sofaer, Sudha Rani, Ghanshyam, Dewan Sharar	Costume	Indo International Talkies. Music: Ernest Broadhurst; Lyrics:
Khubsurat Bala	D. N. Madhok, M. R. Kapoor	Gulab, Miss Iqbal, Madhav Kale, Mukhtar Begum, Zahiruddin, Usha, J. N. Dar	Social	Sansar. Music: Lyrics: D. N. Madhok
Krishna Sudama	Jayant Desai	Madhuri, Bhagwandas, Ghory, Mehtab, Pathak, Ram Apte, Dixit, Kamla Devi, Shanta Kumari, Keki Adjania, Rewashankar	Religious	Ranjit Studios. Music: Lyrics: Narayan Prasad Betab
Kurukshetra	Sardar Balasaheb Yadav	Balasaheb Yadav, Madhavrao Joshi, Padma, Nandrekar, Shlini, Sharda, Ansuya, Hansa.	Mythology	Chhatrapati Cine. Music: Bhurji Khan Saheb; Lyrics: Niranjan Arya

== L-N ==
Title	Director	Cast	Genre	Notes
Lal-E-Yaman	JBH Wadia	Padma, Mohini, Boman Shroff, Firoze Dastur, Master Mohammed, Sayani Aatish, Jal Khambata	Costume	Wadia Movietone. Music: Joseph David, Master Mohammed; Lyrics: Munshi Ashiq
Lanka Dahan	Kanjibhai Rathod	Haidar Shah, Shanta Kumari, Maruti Rao, Master Mohammed, Ratilal, Kashinath	Mythology	Krishna Talkies. Music: Master Madhavilal Damodar; Lyrics: Gaurishankar Akhtar
Madhur Murli		Patience Cooper, Leela, Surajram	Devotional	Madan Theatres Ltd. Music: Lyrics:
Mahabharat	Nanubhai Vakil	Zubeida, Master Bachchu, Mehboob Khan, Jal Merchant, Khatoon	Mythology	Sagar Movietone. Music: S. P. Rane; Lyrics: Joseph David
Malati Madhav	A. P. Kapoor	Zebunissa, Sardar Akhtar, Madhav Kale, Ashraf Khan, Gulab, Iqbal, Nand Kishore, Zafar Khan,	Devotional	Saroj M. Music: Sunderdas Bhatia; Lyrics: A. P. Kapoor
Maya Jaal	Shanti Dave	P. Jairaj, Bibbo, Master Nissar, Ameena, Bhudo Advani, Shahzadi, Nayampally, W. M. Khan, S. N. Parashar, A. R. Kabuli	Fantasy	Ajanta Cinetone. Music: B. S. Hoogan; Lyrics: Seemab
Mirza Sahiban	Nagendra Majumdar	Master Bachchu, Kamlabai, Miss Gulzar, Mehboob Khan, Nurjahan, Dinkar, Ismail	Legend Romance	Sagar Movietone. Music: Lyrics:
Miss 1933	Chandulal Shah	Mehtab, E. Billimoria, Gohar Mamajiwala, Yakub, Dixit, Ghory, Keki Adjania, Rewashankar, Gangaprasad	Social	Ranjit Film Company. Music: Jhande Khan; Lyrics:
Nakli Doctor	J. J. Madan	Surajram, Patience Cooper, Sushila, Shaila, Ghulam Mustafa	Social	Madan Theatres Ltd. Music: Lyrics:
Naksh-E-Sulemani	A. P. Kapoor	Harishchandra Bali, Zebunissa, Sardar Akhtar, Ghulam Mohammed, Ashraf Khan, Iqbal, Jani Babu, Zafar Khan	Costume	Saroj Movietone. Music: Sunderdas Bhatia; Lyrics: Munshi Nazan
Nal Damyanti		Mazhar Khan, Akhtari Bai, Indubala, Master Bachchu, Mukhtar Begum, Narmada Shanker	Mythology	East India Film Company. Music: Nagardas Nayak; Lyrics:
Noor-E-Iman	Madanrai Vakil	Madhav Kale, Raja Sandow, Dulari, Devaskar, Nandram, Leela	Costume	Arvind Cinetone. Music: Keshavrao Bhole; Lyrics: Munshi Gyanchand

== O-R ==
Title	Director	Cast	Genre	Notes
Pandav Kaurav	Nanubhai Vakil	Zubeida, Master Bachchu, Jal Merchant, Khatoon, Mehboob Khan, S. Baburao	Mythology	Sagar Movietone. Music: S. P. Rane; Lyrics:
Pardesi Pritam	Nandlal Jaswantal	Madhuri, E. Billimoria, Shanta Kumari, Raja Sandow, Keki Adjania, Charubala	Costume	Ranjit Studios. Music: Jhande Khan; Lyrics: Dhaniram Prem
Patit Pawan	Nagendra Majumdar	Durga Khote, P. Jairaj, Kashinath, Madhukar Gupta, Majumdar, R. Veena, Nurjahan, K. Gore	Religious	Pratima Photophone. Music: B. R. Deodhar; Lyrics: Pandit Ugra
Prem Ka Nasha	N. Majumdar	Sorabji Kerawala, Jehanara Kajjan, Surajram, Kabuli	Social	Madan Theatres Ltd. Music: S. K. Bose; Lyrics:
Premi Pagal	Ezra Mir	Mehboob Khan, Charlie, Kamlabai, Master Bachchu, Khatoon, Kayam Ali, Asooji	Social	Sagar Movietone Music: S. P. Rane; Lyrics: Ramdas Azad
Prithviraj Sanyogita	Narayanrao Sarpotdar	Padma Devi, Navinchandra, Rafiq Ghaznavi, Kishori, Altekar, Datar	Historical Romance Drama	Maharashtra Cine. Music: Rafiq Ghaznavi; Lyrics:
Puran Bhagat	Debaki Bose	K. L. Saigal, Uma Shashi, Molina Devi, Tarabai, Kumar, Bikram Kapoor, K. C. Dey, Anwaribai, Ansari	Devotional Biopic	New Theatres. Music: R. C. Boral; Lyrics: Basant Kumar Dubey
Radha Krishna	Priyanath Ganguly, Tulsi Lahiri	Sabita Devi, Dhiraj Bhattacharya, Indubala, Amar Chowdhury, Angurbala, Bimal Dasgupta, Kamala Jharia, Lakshmi, K. Mukhopadhyay, Saraswati	Religious	East India Film Company. Music: Sunder Das Bhatia
Raja Gopichand	B. M. Shukla	H. C. Bali, Jaddanbai, Ramkrishna Chaube, Devbala, Ismail, Sita Devi	Legend Drama	Playart Phototone. Music: Lyrics:
Rajrani Meera	Debaki Bose	K. L. Saigal, Durga Khote, Prithviraj Kapoor, Molina Devi, Pahari Sanyal, Durgadas Bannerjee, Manoranjan Bhattacharya, Amar Mullick, Chandravati Devi, Indubala, Ansari, Siddiqui	Devotional	New Theatres Music: R. C. Boral; Lyrics:
Ramayana	J. J. Madan	Leela, Narmada Shankar, Mukhtar Begum, Pyara Saheb	Religious	Madan Theatres Ltd. Music: Lyrics:
Rambha Rani	Harshadrai Mehta	Gauhar Karnataki, Baburao Apte, Shivrani Ghosh, Madhav Kale, Dulari, Amritlal Nagar, Bhim, Chandrika, Himmatlal, Lobo	Legend	Sharda Movietone Music: Lyrics: Chimanlal Luhar
Rangila Rajput	M. Bhavnani	Master Nissar, Bibbo, W. M. Khan, Ameena, Kabuli, Shahzadi, Mariyam	Costume	Ajanta Cinetone. Music: B. S. Hoogan
Roop Basant	A. P. Kapoor	Zebunissa, Sardar Akhtar, Ghulam Mohammed, Ashraf Khan, Iqbal	Costume	Saroj Movietone. Music: Sunderdas Bhatia; Lyrics: Munshi Shams

== S-Z ==
Title	Director	Cast	Genre	Notes
Sairandhari	V. Shantaram	Master Vinayak, Shakuntala, Leela, Mane, Nimbalkar, Prabhavati, Kulkarni, Salunke	Mythology	Prabhat Film Company. Music: Govindrao Tembe; Lyrics:
Sati Anusuya	Madanrai Vakil	Mushtari, Jamshedji, Khansaheb, Devaskar, Chanda, Dinkar	Devotional	Imperial Film Company. Music: Pransukh Nayak; Lyrics:
Sati Mahananda	Baburao Patel	Padma Devi, Mubarak, Madhukar Gupte, Shirin Banu, Shantaram, Raja Pandit, Kamlavati	Devotional	Gandharva Cinetone. Music: Govindrao Tembe; Lyrics:
Saubhagya Sundari	Homi Master	D. Billimoria, Sulochana (Ruby Myers), Jamshedji, Khansaheb, Jilloobai, Khalil, Hadi, Syed Ahmed, Lakshmi	Costume	Imperial Film Company. Music: Pransukh Nayak; Lyrics: Munshi Zameer
Shan-E-Subhan	Faredoon Irani	Sultana, Aziz, Rauf, Ismail, Agha Jan Kashmiri, Noorjahan, Aga Munne	Costume	Brahma Film Company.
Sita Swayamvar	H. M. Reddy	Padmavati Shaligram, Sundrabai, B. R. Tandon, Haridas, Sitara Devi, Bhagwandas, Tarabai, Vatsala Joshi	Religious	Vijaya Cinetone. Music: Master Mohammed; Lyrics: Lalchand Falak
Sohni Mahiwal	Harshadrai Mehta	Gohar Karnataki, Baburao Apte, Chonker, Shivrani Ghosh, Nizam, Amritlal Nagar, Bhim, Kantilal, Lobo Naibux	Legend Romance	Sharda Movietone. Music: Lyrics: Munshi Asif
Sulochana a.k.a. Temple Bells	R. S. Choudhary	Sulochana (Ruby Myers), D. Billimoria, Jilloobai, Ghulam Mohammed, Chanda, Jamshedji, Peerjan, Hadi	Cotume	Imperial Film Company. Music: Pransukh Nayak, Gadgil; Lyrics:
Surya Kumari	Dhirubhai Desai	Alaknanda, Ata Mohammed, Udvadia, Gulab, Tarabai, Kashinath, Shankar Rao Khatu	Social	Vishnu Cinetone. Music: Kikubhai Yagnik; Lyrics: Chhabil Das Madhur
Turki Sher	J. J. Madan	Rose, Rajkumari, Sorabji Keravala, Rawidan, A. R. Kabuli, Kakajani Panthki	Costume	Madan Theatres Ltd. Music: Brijlal Varma; Lyrics: Shams Gayavi
Vikram Charitra	Harshadrai Mehta	Gauhar Karnataki, Amritlal Nagar, Shivrani Ghosh, Bhim, Baburao Apte, Madhav Kale, Dulari, Himmatlal	Costume	Sharda Movietone.
Yahudi Ki Ladki	Premankur Atorthy	K. L. Saigal, Rattan Bai, Pahari Sanyal, Nawab, Kumar, Radharani, Ghulam Mohammed, Tarabai	Costume Drama	New Theatres. Music: Pankaj Mullick; Lyrics: Agha Hashar Kashmiri
Zahar-E-Ishq	J. P. Advani	P. Jairaj, Zohrajan, Master Bachchu, Lovji Lavangia, Panna	Costume	Jayant Pics. Music: B. R. Deodhar; Lyrics: Narayan Prasad Betab
Zahari Saap	J. J. Madan	Jehanara Kajjan, Gulam Hussain, Patience Cooper, Rosy, Kabuli, Sorabji Kerawala, Sheela, Mustafa, C. Panthaki, Fakiruddin	Costume	Madan Theatres Ltd. Music: Brijlal Varma; Lyrics: Narayan Prasad Betab
