= Alam Ara =

1931 Indian film by Ardeshir Irani

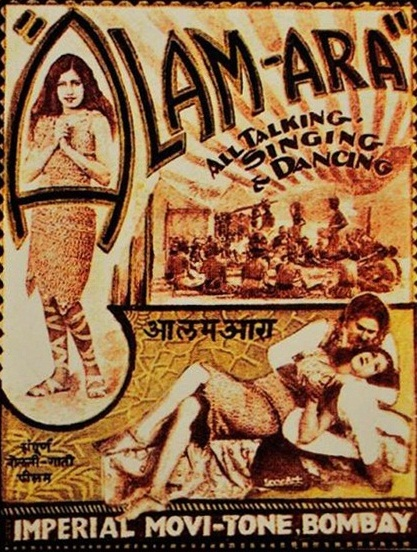
- Theatrical release poster
- Directed by: Ardeshir Irani
- Screenplay by: Ardeshir Irani
- Based on: Alam Ara by Joseph David
- Produced by: Ardeshir Irani
- Starring: Master Vithal; Zubeida; Prithviraj Kapoor
- Cinematography: Adi M. Irani
- Edited by: Ezra Mir
- Music by: Firozshah Mistry; B. Irani
- Production company: Imperial Film Company
- Distributed by: Sagar Movietone
- Release date: 14 March 1931
- Running time: 124 minutes
- Country: India
- Language: Hindustani
- Budget: ₹40,000

Alam Ara (transl. Ornament of the World) is a 1931 Indian historical fantasy film directed and produced by Ardeshir Irani. It revolves around a king and his two wives, Navbahaar and Dilbahaar, who are childless; soon, a fakir (Wazir Muhammad Khan) tells the king that the former wife will give birth to a boy, later named Qamar (Master Vithal), but the child will die following his 18th birthday if Navbahaar cannot find the necklace he asks for. Meanwhile, the king finds out that Dilbahaar has fallen for the senapati Adil (Prithviraj Kapoor), leading the king to arrest him and evict his pregnant wife, who later gives birth to Alam Ara (Zubeida).

Irani was inspired to make Alam Ara after watching the 1929 American part-talkie Show Boat. The story was adapted from the Bombay-based dramatist Joseph David's play of the same name. Made on a budget of ₹40,000 (equivalent to ₹13 million or US$140,000 in 2026), principal photography was handled by Adi M. Irani within four months in Bombay. Because the studio was located near a railway track, it was filmed mostly during the nighttime to avoid noise from the active trains. Following the filming, Ardeshir Irani finished the sound recording, using the single-system recording. Firozshah Mistry and B. Irani served as the music directors.

Alam Ara was released on 14 March 1931 and performed well at the box office. Critics were appreciative, with the performance and songs getting the most attention, though there was some criticism of the sound recording. The film was also widely considered a major breakthrough for the Indian film industry and Ardeshir Irani's career with its status as the country's first sound film. Although no print or gramophone record of the film is known to survive, making it a lost film, surviving artefacts include its stills and posters. In 2017, the British Film Institute declared it as the most important of any lost films produced in India.

== Plot ==
A king and his two wives, Navbahaar and Dilbahaar, are childless. Soon, a fakir tells Navbahaar she will give birth to a boy but if she wants her son to live past his 18th birthday she must find a necklace tied around a fish's neck—which will appear once at the palace's lake. The boy is named Qamar. Besides that, Dilbahaar has an affair with the palace's senapati Adil. The king finds out about this, and Dilbahaar tells him it was Adil who seduced her first. Therefore, the king arrests him and evicts his pregnant wife, Mehar Nigar, from the palace; Nigar gives birth to Alam Ara and dies when a shikari tells her about her husband's affair. The shikari later adopts Ara.

Dilbahaar is jealous of Navbahaar and knows about her agreement with the fakir. When the necklace appears on Qamar's 18th birthday, she secretly replaces it with a fake one, which soon results in Qamar's death. His family, however, does not bury his body and starts looking for the fakir to find out what went wrong. As a result, Qamar comes alive every night when Dilbahaar removes the necklace from her neck and later dies when she wears it in the morning. Apart from that, Ara knows about her innocent father's suffering, vowing to release him from prison. On her visit to the place one night, Ara sees the alive Qamar and falls for him. Everyone in the palace subsequently learns about Dilbahaar's foul play and finally retrieve the real necklace, with Adil being released. The film ends with Qamar and Ara living happily together.

== Cast ==
- Master Vithal as Qamar
- Zubeida as Alam Ara
- Prithviraj Kapoor as Adil
- Bibbo as Alam Ara's Friend
- Wazir Muhammad Khan as a Fakir (cameo appearance)

Other supporting roles were played by Jilloo, Sushila, Elizer, Jagdish Sethi, L. V. Prasad, and Yaqub.

== Production ==
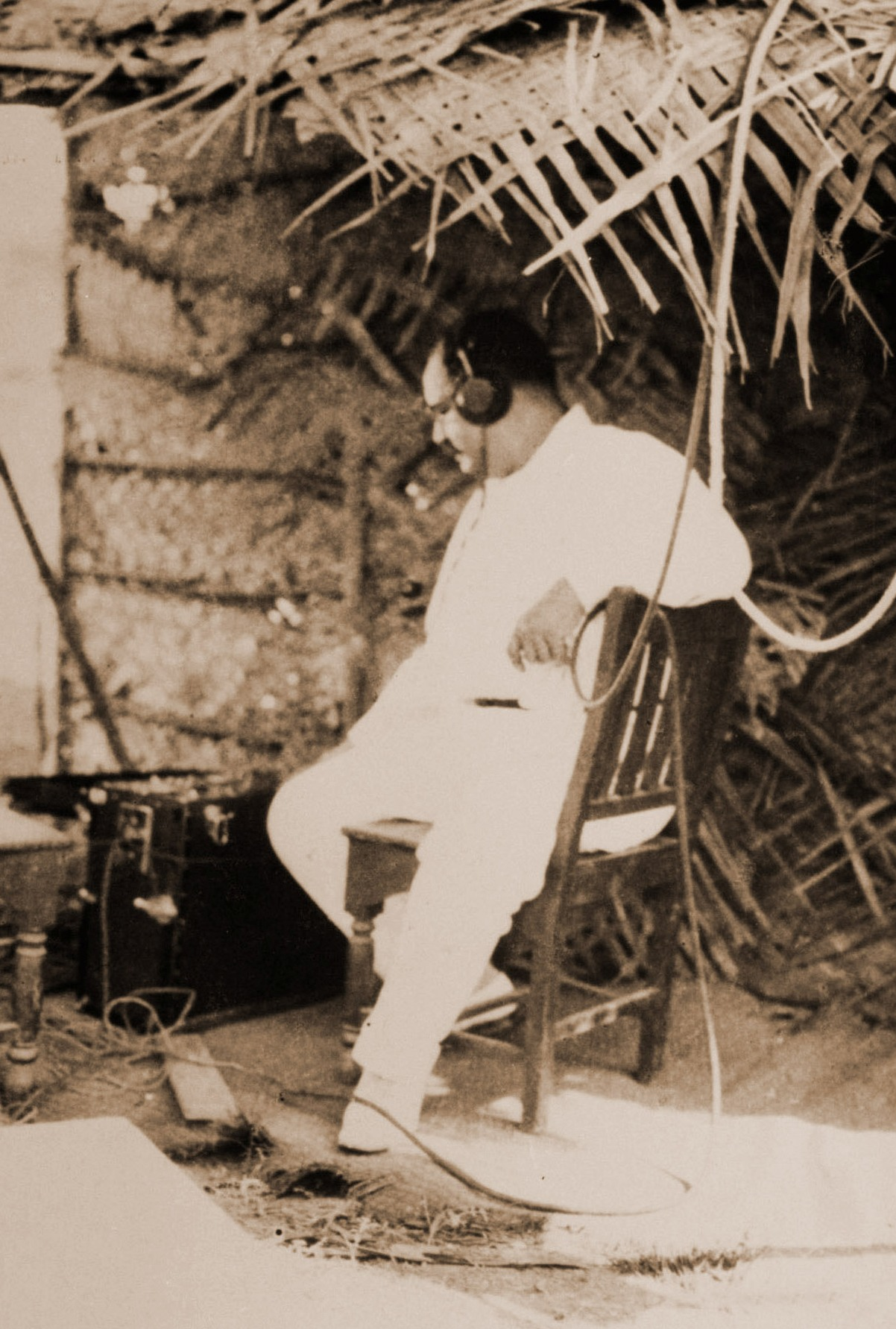
Irani at the sets of Alam Ara, recording the film's sound

After watching Harry A. Pollard's 1929 American romantic drama part-talkie Show Boat at Excelsior Theatre in Bombay (present-day Mumbai), Ardeshir Irani was inspired to make his next project a sound film which he would direct and produce. Although having no experience creating this type of film, he determined to make it and decided to not follow any precedential sound films. The project was subsequently titled Alam Ara and produced by Irani for Imperial Film Company (IFC), an entertainment studio he co-founded with the tent showman Abdulally Esoofally in 1926. The story was adapted from the Bombay-based dramatist Joseph David's Parsi play of the same name, while the screenplay was done by Irani. The dialogue was written in Hindustani, a mix of Hindi and Urdu.

Zubeida was cast in the title role after Irani's frequent collaborator and first choice, Ruby Myers, was unable to join the cast due to her inability to speak the film's language. This left Myers disappointed and she took a one-year hiatus from acting, perfecting her ability to speak Hindustani. Irani initially wanted the debutant Mehboob Khan to be the male lead, but later changed his mind and wanted a "more commercially-viable" actor, an opportunity taken by Master Vithal—one of the most successful filmmakers of Indian silent cinema. In later years, Khan would admit that it left him unhappy. When Vithal decided to star in the film, he ended his ongoing contract with Saradhi Studios, at which he started his career, causing him legal issues as the studio believed he was in breach of contract. With help from his lawyer Muhammad Ali Jinnah, he won the case and moved to IFC to play the male lead of Alam Ara.

Alam Ara, which was funded by the business tycoon Seth Badriprasad Dube, cost ₹40,000 (equivalent to ₹13 million or US$140,000 in 2026). Principal photography was completed by Adi M. Irani at Jyoti Studios in Bombay within four months, using equipment that was bought from Bell & Howell. When being interviewed by Bhagwan Das Garga, Ardeshir Irani confessed that he kept the project a secret during its production. H. M. Reddy, Bharucha, Gidwani, and Pessi Kerani were the assistant directors. As the studio was located near a railway track, the film was shot mostly during the nighttime—between 1:00 am and 4:00 am—to avoid noise from the active trains, which according to Ardeshir Irani would pass every several minutes. Microphones were placed at concealed locations around the actors.

Irani and Rustom Bharucha, a lawyer and the manager of his other production company, Imperial Studios, worked as sound technicians for the film. Before the shooting started, they learned the basics of sound recording from American expert Wilford Deming. When Deming came to Mumbai to give them the sound machines, he charged ₹100 (equivalent to ₹33,000 or US$350 in 2026), which Irani considered a large number at the time. Irani could not fulfill his demand and later finished it by himself and Bharucha. They used Tanar, a single-system recording by which sound is recorded at the same time of shooting. After filming ended, Alam Ara was edited by Ezra Mir and its final reel length was 10,500 ft (3,200 m). In 2012, the magazine Outlook reported that the cast and crew were pleased to be parts of the film and ready to receive lesser pays for their work.

== Soundtrack ==
The soundtrack to Alam Ara was released by Saregama, and has a total of seven songs.

No	Song name	Singer	Note
1	De De Khuda Ke Naam Pe Pyaare	Wazir Muhammad Khan	He became popular at the time of its release and was acknowledged as the first song of Hindi cinema
2	Badla Dilwayega Yaar Ab Tu Sitamgaroon Se	-	
3	Rootha Hai Aasmaan	-	
4	Teri Kateelee Nigaahon Ne Mara	-	
5	De Dil Ko Aaram Aey Saaki Gulfaam	-	
6	Bhar Bhar Ke Jaam Pila Ja	-	
7	Daras Bin Morey Hain Tarse Nayna Pyare	-	

Zubeida performed mostly the rest of the songs. The credit of the film, however, did not mention both the music director and lyricist. According to Ferozshah Mistri's son Kersi Mistri, all of the songs were composed by his father; in contrast, the film's booklets mentioned B. Irani as the composer. Ardeshir Irani said that he did not know who the music directors are, adding that he had only a pump organ and tabla player. Furthermore, he confessed that the lyrical composition was done by himself.

== Release and reception ==
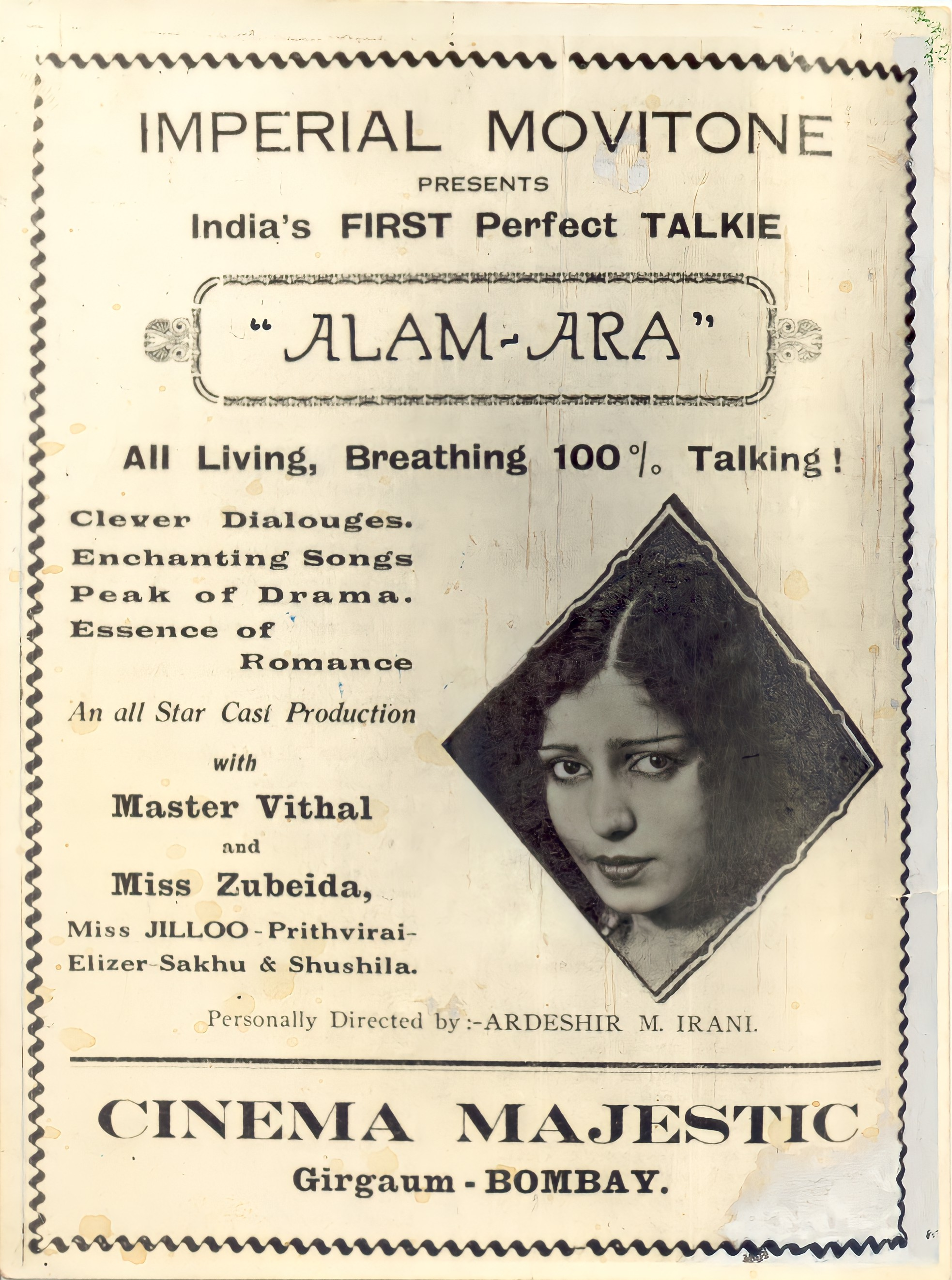
A promotional poster for Alam Ara at Majestic Cinema

Distributed by Sagar Movietone, Alam Ara premiered at Majestic Cinema, Bombay on 14 March 1931, and the screenings ran for eight weeks. Ramesh Roy, an office boy of IFC, brought the film's reel to the theatre. When Mayank Shekhar of the Hindustan Times interviewed him in 2006, he recalled it as "a moment in history, when the public coming out of the show wouldn't stop talking about the film they'd seen, that also talked!" According to Daily Bhaskar, crowds of people would stand in line from 9:00 am although the first show occurred at 3:00 pm. As a solution, police were assigned to the theatre and allowed to use batons to control the crowds and traffic. Sharmistha Gooptu, in her article published in The Times of India, reported: "[Alam Ara] is proving to a great attraction at the Majestic Cinema, and crowded houses have been the order of the day." It was also the first film to be screened at Imperial Cinema in Paharganj.

The film clashed with Shirin Farhad, a J.J. Madan-directed musical film that was released around two months later. Exact figures for the box-office earnings of Alam Ara are not available, but many historians believed that the film performed well. According to the Encyclopaedia of Hindi Cinema in 2003, the film was more successful than Shirin Farhad; a 2006 report from The Hindu stated that it became an "instant hit". Similar thoughts were given by Roy Armes, in his book titled Third World Film Making and the West (1987), calling the film "an enormous popular success". In 2012, the writer of Outlook observed that the film's commercial performance "dealt a body blow to the careers of the reining stars of [silent] cinema", including Vithal especially since he was not fluent in Hindustani language.

Critics were generally positive of Alam Ara, praising the performance of the cast but some of whom criticising the sound recording; they have noted that it has "shared many of the common defects of Indian productions" and ended a trend where the previous Indian films always promoting social values in their plot. On 2 April 1931, The Bombay Chronicle took note of Irani's "thoughtful" direction and applauded the performances from Vithal, Zubeida and Kapoor, which the reviewer thought had evolved dramatic values that silent films could not do. In the magazine's June 1932 issue, American Cinematographer gave a scathing review, saying that "[t]hroughout, the blindest groping for fundamental facts was evident"; the reviewer wrote that the laboratory processing and sound recording were the biggest issues of the film. A writer of The Times of India observed how the actors lacked experience in talking near microphones, which made them sound like they were screaming. Indian Talkie (a magazine published by the Film Federation of India from 1931 to 1956) called the film "the birth cry of the talkie".

== Legacy ==
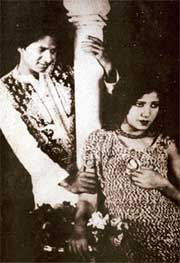
Vithal and Zubeida in a scene of the film. The scene was later re-created by Google into a doodle in 2011

Alam Ara is widely regarded as the first sound film of India. It has been described as the rise of the Indian cinema of the early 1930s, and in its 2013 report, The Times of India added, "... edging out the advantage enjoyed by imported films in the silent era, when the largest share of the Indian market was taken by American films ... this transition also made for the rise of a host of new operators, who would become the industry's vanguard in the first talkie era." The author of Indian Film Music (1991), Nasreen Munni Kabir, said she believed that it has made later films produced in the country more dependent on songs "in a way that has differentiated Indian cinema from most world cinema". Writing for The Rough Guide to World Music (1999), Mark Ellingham reported that the film's success has influenced India, Sri Lanka, and Myanmar. In 2003, the scholar Shoma Chatterji hailed, "With the release of Alam Ara, Indian cinema prove two things—that films could now be made in a regional language that the local viewers could understand; and that songs and music [were] integral part[s] of the entire form and structure of the Indian film."

The film is also considered as a turning point of Ardeshir Irani's career and gave him a reputation as the "father of Indian talkies". Impressed by it, producer Birendranath Sircar acquired the recording equipment of the film and contacted Deming to work with him in Calcutta (present-day Kolkata). Irani used the sets of the film to shoot his next production venture, titled Kalidas, which would become the first Indian multilingual film following its release in 1931. Alam Ara is listed in "40 Firsts in Indian Cinema" by NDTV in 2013, "100 Filmfare Days" by Filmfare in 2014, and "70 Iconic Films of Indian Cinema" by Mint in 2017. In 2011, Google made a doodle to celebrate its 80th release anniversary, featuring Vithal and Zubeida. Writer Renu Saran features the film in the book 101 Hit Films of Indian Cinema (2014). In the same year, a 2015 calendar titled "The Beginnings of Indian Cinema" was released, featuring the poster of its. The film has been remade at least four times: by Chitrapu Narayana Rao in Telugu in 1942 and 1967, and by Nanubhai Vakil in Hindi in 1956 and 1973.

No print of Alam Ara is known to have survived, but several stills and posters are available. According to an article published by The Indian Express, several publications and the film's entry on Wikipedia had mistakenly stated that the film's last print was destroyed by a fire at the National Film Archive of India in 2003. Its founder, P. K. Nair, declined the reports, clarifying in 2011 that it has been lost before the archive itself was established in 1964. He added the fire only destroyed mostly the nitrate negatives of Prabhat Film Company, and confirmed that he had received several photographs of the film from Irani and his son Shapoorji. Nair estimated that 70 percent of pre-1950 Indian films are lost. In 2017, the British Film Institute's Shruti Narayanswamy declared Alam Ara as the most important lost film of India.

== See also ==
- List of lost films
- List of Hindi films of 1931

== Sources ==
- "100 Filmfare Days, 2: Alam Ara". Filmfare. 22 April 2014. Archived from the original on 18 December 2020.
- "70 iconic films of Indian cinema". Mint. 18 August 2017. Archived from the original on 18 August 2017.
- "75 years of Indian cinema". Bombay: The City Magazine. Vol. 9, no. 17–22. Living Media. 1988.
- "85 years of 'Alam Ara': How India's first talkie paved the way for song-dance routines in our films forever". News18. 14 March 2016. Archived from the original on 18 December 2020.
- "Aazaad's Rashtraputra premiered at the 72nd Cannes Film Festival". Mid-Day. 3 June 2019.
- Advani, A. H. (2006). "The father of the Indian talkies". Business India. No. 739–746. Business India Publications.
- Ahmed, Rauf (4 June 2012). "The Ghost Who Talked". Outlook. Archived from the original on 15 March 2013.
- "Alam Ara". Stardust. May 2003. Archived from the original on 5 July 2003.
- "Alam Ara's 80th Anniversary". Business Insider. 14 March 2011. Archived from the original on 29 September 2014.
- Armes, Roy (1987). Third World Film Making and the West. University of California Press. ISBN 978-05-20056-90-9.
- Ausaja, S. M. M. (2009). Bollywood in Posters. Noida, India: Om Books International. ISBN 978-81-87108-55-9.
- Badam, Ramola Talwar (26 December 2004). "India's cities flex muscle by changing names". Los Angeles Times. Associated Press.
- Bali, Karan (15 August 2015). "India's first talkie 'Alam Ara' and Jinnah's role in it". Dawn. Archived from the original on 15 August 2015.
- Bose, Mihir (2006). Bollywood: A History. The History Press. ISBN 81-7436-508-7.
- Chakravarty, Riya (3 May 2013). "Indian cinema@100: 40 Firsts in Indian cinema". New Delhi, India: NDTV. Archived from the original on 18 September 2015.
- Chakravorty, Pallabi (2016). "Bombay Filmi Nach to Bollywood Dance". In Douglas, Rosenberg (ed.). The Oxford Handbook of Screendance Studies. Oxford University Press. ISBN 978-01-99981-61-8.
- Chatterjee, Gayatri (2002). Mother India. British Film Institute. ISBN 0-85170-917-6.
- Datta, Kausik; Dutt, Ishita Ayan (21 April 2005). "EMI pulls out of HMV's Saregama". Rediff.com. Archived from the original on 8 January 2021.
- Dev, Atul (21 September 2013). "The untold story of Jews in Indian cinema". The Sunday Guardian. Archived from the original on 23 October 2013.
- Ellingham, Mark (1999). The Rough Guide to World Music. Rough Guides. ISBN 978-18-582863-6-5.
- "Ezra Mir". British Film Institute.
- Freitag, Sandra B. (2001). "Visions of the Nation: Theorizing the Nexus between Creation, Consumption, and Participation in the Public Sphere". In Dwyer, Rachel; Pinney, Christopher (eds.). Pleasure and the Nation: The History, Politics, and Consumption of Public Culture in India. Oxford University Press. ISBN 978-01-95650-90-7.
- Garga, Bhagwan Das (1980). "Making of Alam Ara: An Interview with Ardeshir Irani". Cinema Vision India. Vol. 1, no. 2–4. Alt URL
- Garga, Bhagwan Das (1996). So Many Cinemas: The Motion Picture in India. Eminence Design. ISBN 978-81-90060-21-9.
- Gazdar, Mushtaq (1997). Pakistan Cinema, 1947–1997. Oxford University Press. ISBN 978-01-95778-17-5.
- Gilmour, David (2018). The British in India: Three Centuries of Ambition and Experience. Penguin Books. ISBN 978-02-410045-3-1.
- Goddard, John (30 July 2003). "Missouri Masala". Riverfront Times. Archived from the original on 24 September 2015.
- Gokulsing, K. Moti; Dissanayake, Wimal (2004) [1998]. Indian Popular Cinema: A Narrative of Cultural Change. Trentham Books. ISBN 1-85856-329-1.
- Gooptu, Sharmishta (3 May 2013). "The Talkie Revolution, 1931, and the rise of 'Indian' cinema". The Times of India. Archived from the original on 5 May 2019.
- Gulzar; Nihalani, Govind; Chatterjee, Saibal (2003). Encyclopaedia of Hindi Cinema. Encyclopædia Britannica, Inc. ISBN 978-81-7991-066-5.
- Guy, Randor (23 July 2011). "Draupadi Vastrapaharanam 1934". The Hindu. Archived from the original on 31 January 2020.
- Indo-Asian News Service (15 December 2014). "A New Year calendar with film posters of yesteryear". The Indian Express. Archived from the original on 26 December 2014.
- Ismat, Tasheen (22 June 2018). "On a heritage trail at Opera House". The Times of India. Times News Network.
- Jain, Amrita (17 March 2011). "Alam Ara long lost, was never with NFAI: founder-director". The Indian Express. Pune, India. Archived from the original on 5 March 2016.
- Kapoor, Shashi; Gahlot, Deepa (2004). Shashi Kapoor Presents the Prithviwallahs. Roli Books. ISBN 978-81-74363-48-0.
- Lal, Ananda (2004). The Oxford Companion to Indian Theatre. Oxford University Press. ISBN 978-01-95644-46-3.
- Mehta, Monika; Mukherjee, Madhuja (2020). Industrial Networks and Cinemas of India: Shooting Stars, Shifting Geographies and Multiplying Media. Taylor & Francis. ISBN 978-10-002933-1-9.
- Miglani, Surendra (26 March 2006). "Talking images: 75 years of cinema". The Tribune. Archived from the original on 23 April 2006.
- Murthy, C. S. H. N. (13 November 2012). "Film Remakes as Cross-cultural Connections Between North and South". The Journal of International Communication. 19 (1–42). Routledge. doi:10.1080/13216597.2012.739573. S2CID 144092306.
- Narasimham, M. L. (24 October 2010). "Bhaktha Prahlada 1931". The Hindu. Archived from the original on 14 January 2021.
- Narasimham, M. L. (8 September 2006). "A leader and a visionary". The Hindu. Archived from the original on 15 April 2014.
- Narasimham, M. L. (9 September 2012). "Wake up, industry". The Hindu. Archived from the original on 18 January 2014.
- Narayanswamy, Shruti (22 March 2017). "The internationalism of P.K. Nair, the celluloid man". British Film Institute. Archived from the original on 21 March 2017.
- Nihalani, Akash (1 July 2018). "Best films of all time (1913–1951)". Filmfare. Archived from the original on 1 July 2018.
- "No prints of several epic films: PK Nair". The Hans India. 26 July 2013.
- Ojha, Rajendra (2002). Hindi Cinema Year Book Volume 1. Screen World Publication. ISBN 978-81-90025-83-6.
- Paul, Chitara (18 February 2009). "India's first talkie 'silent forever'—All Alam-Ara prints lost, govt [sic] clueless". The Telegraph. Archived from the original on 1 August 2020.
- Poorvaja, S. (1 November 2016). "A reel revolution from 85 years ago". The Hindu.
- Pradeep, K. (17 March 2006). "When the stars talked". The Hindu. Archived from the original on 8 September 2006.
- Press Trust of India (7 October 2008). "Prints of first sound movie 'Alam Ara' lost". Outlook.
- Raheja, Dinesh; Kothari, Jitendra (1996). The Hundred Luminaries of Hindi Cinema. India Book House. ISBN 978-81-75080-07-2.
- Rajadhyaksha, Ashish (1996). "Indian Cinema: Origins to Independence". In Nowell-Smith, Geoffrey (ed.). The Oxford History of World Cinema. Oxford University Press. ISBN 978-01-98742-42-5.
- Rajadhyaksha, Ashish; Willemen, Paul (2014) [1994]. Encyclopedia of Indian Cinema. Oxford University Press. ISBN 978-11-35943-18-9.
- Ramachandran, T. M.; Rukmini, S. (1985). 70 Years of Indian Cinema (1913–1983). Cinema India-International. ISBN 978-08-61320-90-5.
- Rovisco, Maria; Nowicka, Magdalena (2013). The Ashgate Research Companion to Cosmopolitanism. Ashgate Publishing. ISBN 978-14-09494-52-2.
- Saran, Renu (2014). 101 Hit Films of Indian Cinema. Diamond Pocket Books. ISBN 978-93-50836-53-8.
- Shekhar, Mayank (14 March 2011). "India's first talkie Alam Ara all gone". Hindustan Times.
- Soofi, Mayank Austen (26 March 2015). "Delhi's cinematic monuments". Mint. Archived from the original on 28 March 2015.
- Tharoor, Shashi (6 September 2002). "Meanwhile: In India's name game, cities are the big losers". The New York Times.
- "The pioneering cameraman". The Hindu. 14 May 2012. Archived from the original on 5 December 2020.
- Valicha, Kishore (1996). Dadamoni: The Authorized Biography of Ashok Kumar. Viking. ISBN 978-06-70872-71-8.
- "ये है पहली बोलती फिल्म की एक्ट्रेस, इनकी फिल्म के लिए लोगों ने खाई लाठियां" [This is the actress of the first sound film, people ate lathis for her film]. Daily Bhaskar (in Hindi). 14 March 2017. Archived from the original on 5 June 2018.
