= Prarthana (1943 film) =

- Directed by: Sarvottam Badami
- Produced by: Sohrab Modi
- Starring: Motilal; Sajjan; Sabita Devi; K. N. Singh; Kajjanbai; Mehboob Khan
- Music by: Saraswati Devi
- Production company: Minerva Movietone
- Release date: 1943
- Country: India
- Language: Hindi

Prarthana (transl. Prayer) is a 1943 Indian Hindi-language social film directed by Sarvottam Badami for Sohrab Modi's Minerva Movietone. The music director was Saraswati Devi and the lyricist was Safdar Aah Sitapuri. Having worked for Madan Theatres Ltd and Sagar Movietone in the 1930s, the famous singer and actress Kajjanbai returned to work after a hiatus of four years working for studios like Minerva Movietone. Prarthana is cited as "probably" her last film before her death in 1945. The film starred Motilal, Kajjanbai, Sabita Devi, Sajjan, Nimabalkar, K. N. Singh, Sadat Ali, Mehboob Khan and Abu Bakar.

== Cast ==
- Motilal as Kedar
- Kajjanbai as Sunderabai
- Sabita Devi as Paroo
- K. N. Singh as Doctor
- Sajjan as Bhai
- Sadat Ali as Mukund Lal
- Mehboob Khan as Ramu Kaka
- Ghulam Hussain as Behari Lal
- Abu Bakar as Buddhu
- I.T. Nimbalkar as Seth Ramdassi
- Menaka Devi as Kusum
- Shorrey as Sir. Shantilal

== Music ==
The music was by Saraswati Devi with lyrics by Safdar Aah. The singers were Kajjanbai, Vasant, Rehmat Bai and Moolchand. The song "Aaya Sawan Aaja" sung by Kajjan with relative ease, was in the raga Brindabani Sarang. Other popular songs of Kajjan from this film are, "Kahe Neha Lagaye Sajaniya" and "Ek Dhundhla Sa Mohabbat Ka Hai Nasha Baaki".

=== Song list ===
#	Title	Singer
1	"Aaya Sawan Aa Jaa Saajan" -----Raga Bindravani Sarang. Tal Dadra.	Jahanara Kajjan
2	"Ek Dhundhla Sa Mohabbat Ka Hai Nasha Baaki" ----Raga Jaunpuri.	Jahanara Kajjan
3	"Kahe Neha Lagaye Sajaniya" -----Raga Pilloo.	Jahanara Kajjan
4	"Mohabbat Ka Rasta Dikhaya Na Hota" ----Raga Bhim Palasi.	Jahanara Kajjan
5	"Tumhare Darshan Ka Naina Taras Gaye Ho" ----Raga Gond Tal Kaharawa.	Jahanara Kajjan
6	"Gajare Wali Najariya Milaye Ja" ----Raga Des Tal Kaharawa.	Rehmat Bai, Moolchand
7	"Khel Ye Sansar Hai Jaan Ki Hain Baaziyan" ----Raga Kafi. Tal Dadra.	Vasant
8	"Hari Aate Hai" ----Raga Aman Kalyan. Tal Kaharawa.	Vasant
9	"Chhip Na Saka Ab Chhipane Wala" -----Raga Mond. Tal Kaharawa.	
10	"Do Jeevan Mein Gaanth Lagi" ----Raga Bihag. Tal Dadra.	
