= Bombay Mail =

Bombay Mail may refer to:

- Bombay Mail (1934 film), an American pre-Code drama film
- Bombay Mail (1935 film), a Hindi-language Indian film
- Imperial Indian Mail, a train from Bombay to Calcutta during the British Raj
