= Kajjanbai =

Indian singer and actress

Jahanara Kajjan
- Born: Jahanara Begum; 15 February 1915; Patna, Bihar British India
- Died: 20 December 1945 (aged 30); Bombay, Maharashtra, British India
- Other names: Nightingale of Bengal; Lark of Hindi Cinema; The Lark of India; Beautiful Nightingale of Bengal Screen; Miss Kajjan
- Occupations: Singer; actress; model
- Years active: 1920–1945
- Parent(s): Suggan Begum (mother); Nawab Chammi Saheb of Bhagalpur (father)

Jahanara Kajjan (15 February 1915 – 20 December 1945), or "Miss Kajjan", was an Indian singer and actress active from the 1920s to the 1940s. She is often referred to as the "Nightingale of Bengal". The reigning queen of early talkie films, a glamorous movie sensation, trained classical singer, fashion icon and trendsetter, she was known as the "Lark of Hindi Cinema", "The Lark of India" and the "Beautiful Nightingale of Bengal Screen". She and Master Nissar were the most sought-after and popular singing pair of the stage and film. She was a popular star of silent films.

She was one of the top leading ladies of the 1930s along with actresses like Bibbo, Devika Rani, Durga Khote, Sulochana, Mehtab, Shanta Apte, Sabita Devi, Leela Desai and Naseem Banu. She was referred to as "one of the most important female stars of the 1930s and 1940s". Her fame had her featured in the lyrics of a popular song from the film Gharib Ke Lal (1939) sung by Mirza Musharraf and Kamla Karnataki, with music by Sagheer Asif and lyrics by Rafi Kashmiri. "Tujhe Kajjan Kahoon Ke Shanta" (Should I call you Kajjan or Shanta), where Santha Kumari referred to another popular actress of the time. This was the first time a song featuring famous actors was used in the lyrics of a film song.

== Early life ==
Born on 15 February 1915 to Suggan Begum of Lucknow who was very famous for her beauty and singing capabilities and the Nawab Chammi Saheb of Bhagalpur. Kajjan received education at home and learnt English. Well versed in Urdu literature, she wrote poetry under pseudonym “Ada” she received training in Hindustani classical music from Ustad Hussain Khan of Patna. She was hired by a theatre company at Patna. Then she joined Alfred Company owned by Madan Theatres of Calcutta. Kajjan attained name and fame as a very popular singer and actor of the stage.

== Career ==
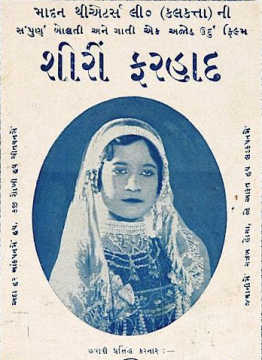
Kajjanbai as the title character in Shirin Farhad (1931)

The advent of talkies in 1931 brought a revolution in Film industry Madan Theatre of Calcutta, “Shirin Farhaad” based on the stage play scripted by the renowned playwright Agha Hashar Kashmiri. It featured 42 songs by Kajjan and Nissar, already popular singing pair of the stage. The film got overwhelmed success across India with Kajjan emerging as the first superstar of Hindi cinema then came another super hit “Laila Majnu”, followed by “Indrasabha” based on the play written by Agha Hasan Amanat, it had 71 songs, the film still holds the world record as “film with most songs”. The film with duration of three and half hours was entirely in verse and Kajjan sang several songs, it became a blockbuster.. . Some of her other memorable movies were "Bilwamangal", "Shakuntala", "Alibaba aur Chalis Chor", "Aankh ka Nasha", "Zehari Saanp", etc.

By mid 1936 her relation with Seth Karnani owner of Madan theatre deteriorated and she left Madan theatres and she had to face a legal case by Karnani which ruined her she had to sell her mansion in Calcutta and all of her property so she left Calcutta in early 1938 and made her own theatrical company Jahanara Theatrical Company and decided to present her famous old shows with less duration and some new settings, she spent 60,000 rupees in those days on a stage project and started doing shows in all over India started from lahore, Amritsar, multan, Delhi and Bombay but her health started to fall so she along with her Mother Suggan bai had to settle in Bombay and started working in Bombay film Industry Kajjan's career in Bombay was short-lived from 1941 to 1944, during which she appeared in seven films mostly of Ranjit films, sunrise pictures and Minerva films none of them made big for Kajjan with the exception of Sohrab Modi's Prithvi Vallabh in which she was given a character role Further, she was given character roles so she could not made it big in Bombay. Her films in Bombay were Ghar Sansar, Suhagan, Bharuthari, Prarthna, Merchant of Venice and her last was Ranjit films Mumtaz Mahal in which she played Empress Noor Jahan. She lived a lavish life at Calcutta. She even had two tiger cubs as pets. Kajjan had learnt western dancing and was a regular visitor to Calcutta Club, it is said that she was intimately involved with Najmul Hassan, a popular Star in 1930s. She died of Cancer in late December 1945 at a young age of 30. Starting her career from stage, she moved to films, joining J. J. Madan's Madan Theatres. Two of her early Talkies becoming instant hits, Shirin Farhad (1931) and Laila Majnu (1931) both Madan Theatre productions. Her co-star in the two films was Master Nissar and the duo became popular singing sensations, with Kajjan being known as "the lark of India". Her mother was a tawaif with important connections. Kajjan was the daughter of the courtesan Suggan and a Nawab of Bhagalpur. Jahanara was educated at home, where she learned English and Urdu; she wrote poetry, some of which was published. She received a classical music training from Ustad Hussain Khan. She began appearing on stage in the years when women were first allowed to perform in the Indian theatre.

Aside from acting, Kajjanbai and Ustad Ghulam Mohammed also taught Noor Jehan when the latter was young, making her do riyaz up to 12 hours each day. Later she also mentored and trained Rehana in acting and dancing. Kajjan stopped singing in 1930, however, she continued to star in movies such as Shirin Farhad and Layla Majnun opposite Nissar, becoming a symbol of on-screen romance in the cinema of India.

== Notable films ==
Shirin Farhad (1931), the second Indian Talkie to be made, was released two months after the landmark Alam Ara, which released on 11 March 1931. The story centred on a folk-legend from the Shahnama, and was already a success on the Parsi stage. J. J. Madan adapted it to film form with Master Nissar and Kajjan playing the lead roles. According to author Gooptu, the film "created a box-office record". It was "twice as successful" compared to Alam Ara, and had 17 (out of the 18) songs sung by Jehanara Kajjan and Master Nisaar.

- Laila Majnu (1931)
- Indrasabha (1932)
- Bilwamangal (1932)
- Zehri Saanp (1933)
- Sakhi Lutera (1934)
- Rashida (1935)
- Miss Manorma (1935)
- Mera Pyara (1935)
- Regeneration (1936)
- Shaitan Ka Pash (1936)

== Personal life ==
She was known to be intimately involved with actor Najmul Hassan, a popular star in the 1930s. They were in a relationship for a few months before parting ways.

== Death ==
Kajjan died in 1945 in Bombay, Maharashtra, British India.

== Songs ==
- Kahe Neha Lagaye Sajania
- Tumhare Darshan Ko Naina
- Ek Dhundla Sa Mohabat Ka Hai Naqsha
- Aya Sawan Aja Sajan
- Kookat Koyalia

== Filmography ==
=== Film ===
Year	Film	Role	Director
1931	Shirin Farhad	Shirin	J.J. Madan
1931	Satyawadi Raja Harishchandra		J.J. Madan
1931	Laila Majnu	Laila	Kanjibhai Rathod
1931	Shakuntala 1		J.J. Madan
1931	Laila Majnu 1	Laila	J.J. Madan
1932	Ankh Ka Tara		Jyotish Bannerjee
1932	Alibaba & Forty Thieves		J.J. Madan
1932	Chatra Bakavali		J.J. Madan
1932	Gulru Zarina	Zarina	J.J. Madan
1932	Indrasabha	Fairy	J.J. Madan
1932	Ali Baba and the Forty Thieves		
1932	Bilwamangal		
1932	Pati Bhakti		
1932	Shakuntala		
1933	Dhruva		Jyotish Bannerjee
1933	Aankh Ka Nasha		J.J. Madan
1933	Prem Ka Nasha		J.J. Madan
1933	Zehari Saap	Shehzadi	J.J. Madan
1934	Sakhi Lutera		Sorabji Kerawala
1934	Garib Ki Duniya		Sorabji Kerawala
1934	Anokha Prem		Faredoon Irani
1935	Miss Manorama	Manorama	Faredoon Irani
1935	Jahanara	Jahanara	Faredoon Irani
1935	Mera Pyara		Ezra Mir
1935	Dil Ki Pyas		J.J. Madan
1935	Rashida	Rashida	Ezra Mir
1935	Prem Ki Ragini	Ragini	Faredoon Irani
1936	Shaitan Ka Pash		Ezra Mir
1936	Nariraj		
1936	Regeneration		
1936	Struggle		
1936	Raj Dulari	Dulari	
1940	Abla Ki Shakti		Munshi Dil
1941	Zalim Saudagar	Portia	J.J. Madan
1941	Mubarak		Barkat Ram Mehra
1942	Ghar Sansar		V.M. Vyas
1943	Prarthana	Sunderabai	Sarvottam Badami
1943	Prithvi Vallabh	Lakshmi Devi	Sohrab Modi
1944	Bhartrahari		
1944	Mumtaz Mahal	Noor Jehan	Kidar Nath Sharma

== Sources ==
- Orsini, Francesca (2006). Love in South Asia: A Cultural History. United Kingdom: Cambridge University.
- "Noor Jahan (The legend of Pakistani Music)". Pakistan Television Corporation World News. Archived from the original on 11 August 2006.
