= Zalim Saudagar =

- Directed by: J.J. Madan
- Written by: Pandit Bhushan, based on Shakespeare
- Starring: Kajjanbai; Khalil
- Release date: 1941
- Country: India
- Language: Hindi

Zalim Saudagar is a 1941 Bollywood drama film The film is also known as Merchant of Venice. It was directed by J.J. Madan and starred Khalil, Kajjanbai, Rani Premlata, and Haider Bandi in the pivotal roles. Zalim Saudagar means "The Cruel Merchant"; this film was a film adaptation of Shakespeare's Merchant of Venice, and was produced by the Radha Film Company of Calcutta. The film is very difficult to obtain and few copies of it appear to exist.
