= Abla Ki Shakti =

1940 Hindi Language film

- Directed by: Munshi Dil Lucknowi
- Starring: Kajjanbai
- Release date: 1940
- Country: British Raj
- Language: Hindi

Abla Ki Shakti is a 1940 Bollywood film directed by Munshi Dil Lucknowi. It stars Kajjanbai, Phool Kumari and Premlata.

== Cast ==
- Kajjanbai
- Phool Kumari
- Premlata
