= Jugalanguriya =

- Directed by: Jyotish Bannerjee
- Written by: Bankim Chandra Chattopadhyay
- Based on: Jugalanguriya by Bankim Chandra Chattopadhyay
- Starring: Light Alias; Tarak Bala; Tulsi Banerjee; Satyendra Nath Dey
- Production company: Madan Theatre
- Release date: 9 February 1929
- Country: India
- Language: Silent (Bengali intertitles)

Jugalanguriya is a Bengali silent drama film directed by Jyotish Bannerjee based on the same name novel of Bankim Chandra Chattopadhyay. This film was released on 9 February 1929 under the banner of Madan Theatres. No complete print is available of the film and it is believed to be a lost silent film of India.

== Cast ==
- Light Alias
- Tarak Bala
- Satyendra Nath Dey
- Tulsi Banerjee
- Iris Gasper
- Joy Narayan Mukherjee
- Shashimukhi
