= Elizer =

Indian actor of Jewish descent

- Born: Elizer
- Other names: M. Elizar, M. Elizer.
- Occupation: Actor
- Years active: 1920s-1949
- Known for: Small roles
- Notable work: Alam Ara (1931), Draupadi (1931)

Elizer was an Indian actor of Jewish descent.

== Filmography ==
Elizer acted in many silent films until he switched to talkies and did this till 1949.

- Ratnavali (1922)
- Paap No Fej (1924)
- Ra Navaghan (1925)
- Sati Saroj (1926)
- Radha Madhav (1926)
- Diwan Bhamasha (1926)
- Bhagva Zenda (1926)
- Indrajal (1926)
- Dulari (1926)
- Princess Lila (1927)
- Poonam No Chand (1927)
- Gatarnun Lulab (1927)
- Alla Ka Pyara (1927)
- Alladin Ane Jadui Fanas (1927)
- Alibaba Chalis Chor (1927)
- Rajrang (1928)
- Pita Ke Parmeshwar (1928)
- Kusum Kumari (1928)
- Sarovarani Sundary (1928)
- Sinhaka Bachha Sinha (1929)
- Maurya Patan (1929)
- Jakhmi Jigar (1929)
- Dagakhor Dilbar (1929)
- Bagdad No Baharvatio (1929)
- Bilwamangal (1929)
- Sindabad Khalasi (1930)
- Raat Ki Baat (1930)
- Alam Ara (1931)
- Khuda Ki Shaan (1931)
- Draupadi (1931)
- Anangsena (1931)
- Dagabaz, Ashiq (1932)
- Shahi Khazana (1946)
- Lady Robinhood (1946)
- Chalis Karod (1946)
- Chamakti Bijli (1946)
- Roop Lekha (1949)
