= Madame Azurie =

Pakistani actor (1907-1998)

Madam Azurie
- Born: Anna Marie Gueizelor; 1907/1916; Bangalore, British India (now in India)
- Died: August 1998
- Occupations: Dancer and actress (film)
- Years active: 1934-60
- Spouse: Sayyed Allauddin Ahmed Gelani

Anna Marie Gueizelor better known as Azurie or Madam Azurie (1907, Banglore - 1998, Rawalpindi) was a classical dancer and actress in British India and later Pakistan. She starred in many Indian, Pakistani and Bengali films and is considered the first item dancer of the Indian film industry.

== Personal life ==
Azurie was born as Anna Marie Gueizelor in 1907 (some accounts put her year of birth as 1916) in Bangalore, British India (now in Karnataka, India). Her mother was a Hindu Brahmin nurse while her father was a Jewish German doctor. When her parents separated, she lived with her father who encouraged her to study ballet, but not eastern dance. He let his daughter study ballet and piano with a group of Russian emigrants. Azurie and her family moved to Bombay, when she was in her adolescent years. Her father became a part of Three arts circle which allowed Azurie to interact with its organizer, Begum Atiya Fyzee-Rahamin. With Atiya, Azurie studied eastern arts and dance. Azurie moved with Atiya when her father died. Azurie died in August 1998.

== Career ==
Azurie explored different dances of the subcontinent and studied under different masters. She soon became a part of the Bombay film industry. Her first film was Nadira. After that, She starred in many films like Pardesi Saiyaan, Qatl-e-Aam, The Bombay talkies and Naya Sansar. Azurie starred in more than 700 films and was well known for her dances. Movies were sold for Azurie's dance and she became a well-known item number dancer. She was also invited to Buckingham Palace for a dance performance. Azurie also acted in Bengali films like Maya, Sonar Sansar and Lagna Bandhan.

=== Pakistan ===
During this time she married a Muslim man and settled in Rawalpindi, Pakistan after independence. There she opened the academy of classical dance where Azurie taught for many years. Azurie also acted in a few Pakistani films but retired from it soon. She travelled with a group of artists and performed in different places.

In Islamabad, Azurie was a member of the board of the National Council of the Arts. She was founding member of the Pak-American Cultural Centre, in Karachi, where she taught classical dance for many years.

== Filmography ==
- Pardesi Saiyaan - 1935
- Qatl-e-Aam - 1935
- The Bombay Talkies
- Naya Sansar-1941
- Jhankar - 1942
- Kaljug - 1942
- Nai Duniya - 1944
- Shahjehan - 1946
- Parwana - 1947
- Maya (1935) (Bengali)
- Sonar Sansar (Bengali)
- Lagna Bandhan (Bengali)
