= Shirin Farhad (1931 film) =

1931 film

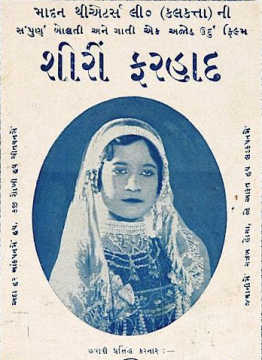
- A promotional poster for Shirin Farhad, 1931.
- Directed by: J.J. Madan
- Starring: Kajjanbai; Master Nissar
- Release date: 1931
- Country: India
- Language: Hindi

Shirin Farhad is a 1931 Hindi language musical film. It was the second Indian film with sound. It was based on the love story from the Shahnameh of Farhad and Shirin by Nizami Ganjavi. The film was directed by J.J. Madan and starred Master Nissar and Kajjanbai. Alam Ara, released earlier the same year, was the first Indian film with sound.

== Cast ==
- Master Nissar as Farhad
- Kajjanbai as Shirin
- Mohamed Hussein
- Abdul Rehman Khabuli
- Sharifa Bai

== Soundtrack ==
The music is written by Agha Hashar Kashmiri and composed by Brijlal Varma.

1. Kirtgaar Teri Shaan Laasaani
2. Pyaare-Pyaare Kya Gulkare Phasle-Bahar Aaye Hai
3. Kaise Aaye Je Jo Karar, Mujhse Rutha Hai Mera Maalik
4. In Kadmo Se Bandh Gaye Sheere Ke Tadbeer
5. Jaau Nahar Khod Laau, Ho Madadgaar Baare, Himmat Se Jo
6. Lab Pe Aahe Nahi, Shikvaa Nahi Fariyaad Nahi
7. Pyaare-Pyaare Surat Ka Hoo Deewana, Zamane Se Ho Gaya Begaana
8. Woh Mukkadar Na Raha, Woh Zamana Na Raha, Tum Jo Begaane Huye
9. Main To Sheere Ka Hoon Deewana, Kya Cheejh Hai Jaan Gavaana
10. Yaarab Na Kise Ko Ho Aazaar Mohabbat Ka
11. Naseeme Subah Tu Itnaa Use Sunaa Dena
12. Maseeha Tamasha Dikhaye Chala Ja, Main Martaa Hoo Tu Jalaaye Chala Ja
13. Zindagi Hijra Main Hai Musibat Mujhko, Saans Lene De Jara
14. Ruka Hai Dam, Har Ek Shai Saans Lene Ko Tarastee Hai
15. Paaye Na Ghade Bhar Bhi Rahat Tere Chahat Mein, Naale He Rahe Lab Pe
16. Kaisa Naseeb Laaye Thee Gulshane-Rojgaar Mein, Jal Gaya Baage Zindagi
17. Char Din Ke Yeh Zindagani Hai, Duniya Hai Phani, Tu Dhyan Na Kar

== See also ==
- Shirin Farhad (1956 film), another Hindustani-language adaptation of the classic romance, directed by Aspi Irani and starring Madhubala and Pradeep Kumar
