= Bombay Mail (1935 film) =

- Directed by: Rasik Bhatt
- Story by: Vijay Bhatt
- Produced by: Vijay Bhatt
- Starring: Panna, Jayant, Rajkumari
- Cinematography: G. Shirodkhar
- Music by: Lalubhai Nayak
- Production company: Prakash Pictures
- Release date: 1935
- Country: India
- Language: Hindi

Bombay Mail (बॉम्बे मेल) is a 1935 Hindi-language Indian film directed by Rasik Bhatt for Vijay Bhatt and Shanker Bhatt's Prakash Pictures. The cast includes leading lady Panna, supporting actress Rajkumari, both of whom had starred in the brothers' previous film, Sacred Scandal (1934), alongside senior character actor Jayant, Umakant, Esmail, Rajababu and S. Nazir. Music for Bombay Mail included ten songs by the Bhatt brothers' regular music director Lalubhai Nayak, including "Kaaga re jaiyo piya ki" and "Kis ki aamad ka yoon", both sung by the senior actress, later known by full name Rajkumari Dubey.
