= Christopher Pinney =

British anthropologist

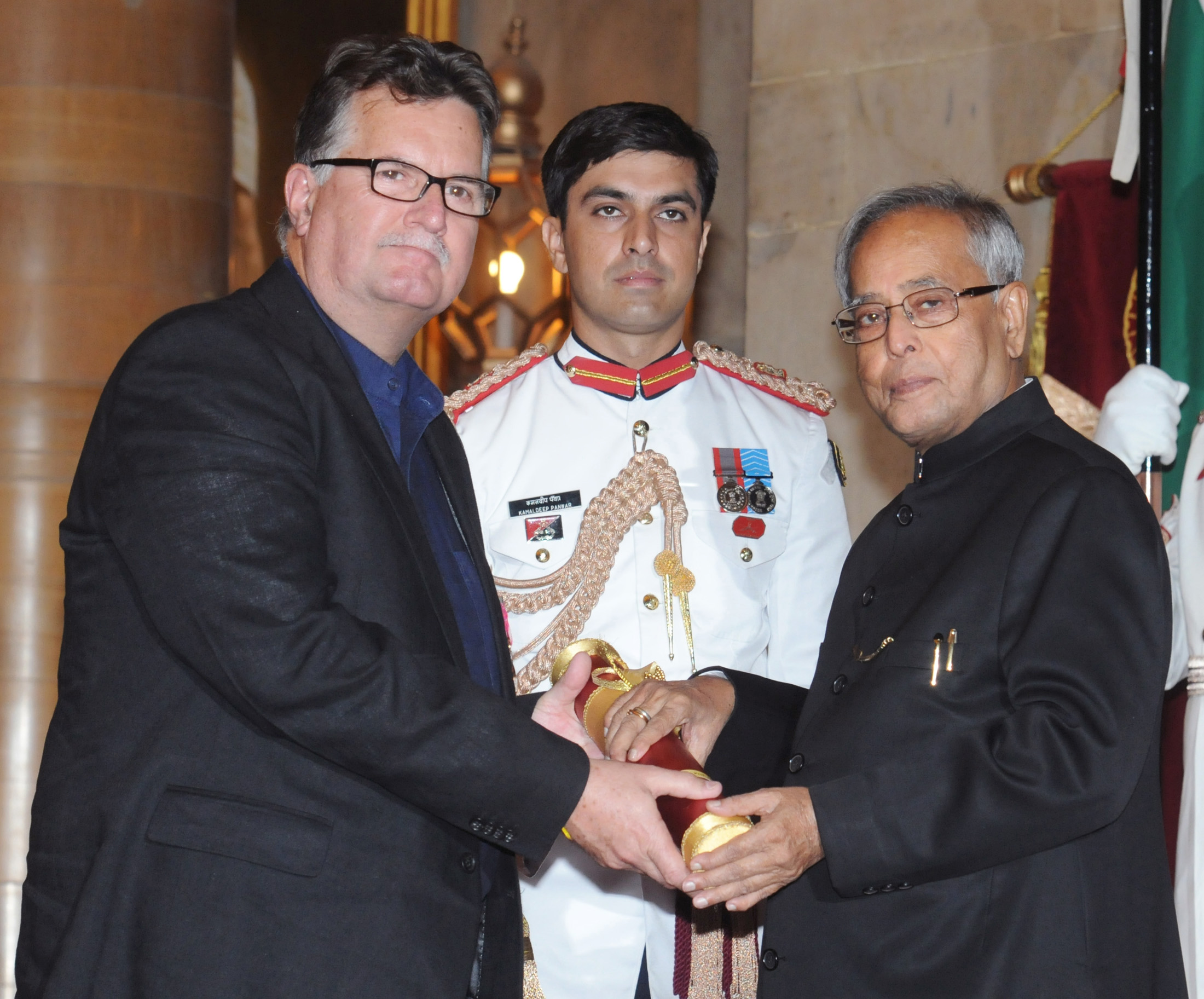
- The President, Shri Pranab Mukherjee presenting the Padma Shri Award to Prof. Christopher Pinney, at an Investiture Ceremony-II, at Rashtrapati Bhavan, in New Delhi on April 20, 2013
- Occupation: Anthropologist
- Awards: Padma Shri
- Website: Official web site

Christopher Pinney is an anthropologist and art historian, and professor of anthropology and visual culture at University College London in the department of anthropology. He is known for his studies on the visual culture of South Asia, specifically India. He was honoured by the Government of India, in 2013, by bestowing on him the Padma Shri, the fourth highest civilian award, for his contributions to the field of literature.

Christopher Pinney has travelled India and his collection of chromolithographs cover the rural Madhya Pradesh during the turn of the century, cultural festivals like Kumbh Mela, Holi and Rang Panchami, historical sites such as Hussain Tekri, Bheruji Mandir, South Park Street Cemetery and Indian Museum in Kolkata, and places like Nepal, Varanasi and Sri Lanka.

Pinney has worked and taught at many institutions such as Australian National University, University of Chicago, University of Cape Town, and Jawaharlal Nehru University. He works as Professor of Anthropology and Visual Culture at the University College, London and as the Crowe Visiting Professor of Art History at the Northwestern University.

Christopher Pinney has published many books and Camera Indica: The Social Life of Indian Photographs, Photos of the Gods and The Coming of Photography in India are some of the notable ones.

Pinney has collaborated in the publication of many journals and other publications in the capacity of Editor. he was the co-editor of Beyond aesthetics: Art and the technologies of enchantment, Pleasure and the nation: the history, politics and consumption of public culture in India; and Photography's other histories.

== Awards & Recognitions ==
- Padma Shri, Government of India
