= Master Nissar =

Indian actor (died 1980)

Master Nissar (died 1980) was an Indian actor and singer who became popular for his work in Hindi cinema during the early 1930s. His credits as a leading actor include the musicals Shirin Farhad and Laila Majnu (both 1931), two of the earliest Hindi talkies in which he also sang for himself. Ashok Raj, the author of Hero (2009), credits Nissar alongside Master Vithal for shaping the cinematic personality of the Indian film leading man.

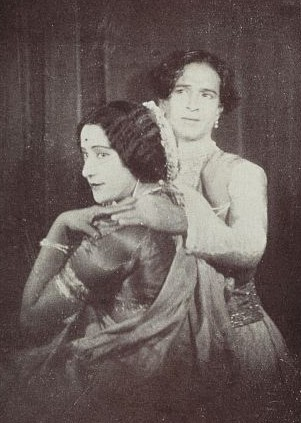
Nissar with Bibbo in a publicity still for Dukhtar-e-Hind (1934)

Nissar began his acting career on stage, sometimes playing female roles due to the lack of women actors at the time. Later joining the Madan Theatre of Calcutta, Nissar entered films in the 1930s and earned immediate success due to his fluent Urdu and singing ability. In 1931, he starred opposite Jehanara Kajjan in Shirin Farhad, a romantic story based on the legend of Shahnameh, that was "narrowly beaten" to release by Alam Ara as India's first sound film. Nissar's further appearances alongside Kajjan, in the musicals Laila Majnu (1931) and Indrasabha (1932), established the singing duo as a popular onscreen couple.

Continuing his film career, Nissar collaborated with the director Mohan Bhavnani in films such as Rangeela Rajpoot and Afzal (both 1933), and also starred in J. P. Advani's costume dramas. A review of Afzal by The Bombay Chronicle hailed Nissar as a "golden-voiced star whose work, both in acting and singing is a real treat". In 1937, Nissar played his last major screen role in the rural crime drama Kisan Kanya, one of India's earliest colour films. His prominence as a leading man declined with the rise of younger actors such as K. L. Saigal and Ashok Kumar.

Contemporary journalist B. K. Karanjia mentions Nissar's subsequent decline in his memoirs: "Master Nissar, the first popular hero of the talkie era and a singer of repute, a man who changed cars every month in the heyday of his career, was in a very bad way with a large family to support." Having turned to begging in his last days, Nissar died in 1980.

== Filmography ==
Year	Film	Role	Production company/Director	Ref.
1931	Shirin Farhad	Farhad	Madan Theatres	
1931	Laila Majnu	Majnu	Madan Theatres	
1931	Shakuntala	King Dushyanta	Madan Theatres	
1932	Indrasabha	Indra	Madan Theatres	
1932	Bilwamangal		Madan Theatres	
1933	Rangeela Rajpoot		Mohan Bhavnani	
1933	Afzal		Mohan Bhavnani	
1934	Sair-e-Paristan		Mohan Bhavnani	
1934	Dukhtar-e-Hind		A. P. Kapur	
1934	Johar-e-Shamsheer		J. P. Advani	
1935	Shah Behram		J. P. Advani	
1935	Bahaar-e-Sulemaani		J. P. Advani	
1937	Kisan Kanya	Ramu	Moti B. Gidwani	
