= Zebunissa (actress) =

Indian actress

- Born: 1913
- Died: 1998 (aged 84–85)
- Other name: Zebu
- Occupation: Actress

Zebunissa (1913–1998) was an Indian actress whose career spanned from the mid-1920s silent era to the 1960s. Also credited as Zebu in some of her films, she began her acting career with the Royal Art Studio in 1926 and remained an employee of the company until its closure in 1940. During this period, she became one of the most popular female actors of Indian films, alongside the likes of Sulochana and Gohar.

Zebunissa made her screen debut in Lakho Phulani (1926), and established herself as a leading lady with high-profile productions, including Alladin Ane Jadui Fanas (1927), Raj Tarang (1928), Patal Padamani (1929), Jigarna Gha, and Rajdoot (both 1930). She formed popular onscreen pairings with actors Master Vithal and P. Jairaj, whom she famously kissed in She / Aurat (1931).

With the advent of talkies in the early 1930s, Zebunissa continued to find work although she was not a trained singer. Her sound films as a star include Saif-e-Sulemani, Johar-e-Shamseer (both 1934), and Bahar-e-Sulemani (1935), and Kal Ki Baat (1937). By the late 1940s, Zebunissa shifted primarily to playing supporting roles; her later credits include Chaudhvin Ka Chand (1960) and Ram Aur Shyam (1967).

== Life and career ==
According to author Sheo Khetan, Zebunissa was born in 1913 and died in 1998, in England.

Zebunissa made her screen debut with the historical drama Lakho Phulani (1926), in which she co-starred with Yusuf. Her career progressed with a series of high-profile productions, including Alladin Ane Jadui Fanas (1927), Raj Tarang (1928), Patal Padamani (1929), and Surya Prabha (1930). The costume film Jigarna Gha (1930) was a major commercial success and helped popularize her onscreen pairing with Master Vithal. In Rajdoot (1930), also released as Beggar Meets Beggar, Zebunissa played a dual role designed to highlight class differences.

Zebunissa subsequently formed another popular screen pairing with actor P. Jairaj, whom she famously kissed in the 1931 film She / Aurat. Their romantic performances led them to be described in the media as "India's Gilbert and Garbo". With the advent of talkies in the early 1930s, studios increasingly preferred actors who were adept at singing, although silent era stars like Zebunissa continued to find work. In 1932, she starred in a sound remake of Gul Bakawali, directed by A. P. Kapoor.

As talkies became established, Zebunissa continued appearing in leading roles. She starred in three of J. P. Advani's directorial ventures: Saif-e-Sulemani (1934), Johar-e-Shamseer (1934), and Bahar-e-Sulemani (1935), the latter two co-starring Master Nissar. In 1937, she was part of the ensemble cast of R. S. Chaudhary's Kal Ki Baat, alongside Surendra, Durga Khote, Rose, and Mubarak. Film historian Virchand Dharamsey described it as "a very ambitious pseudo-historical film having gorgeous settings and based on the story of Mihirkula". Zebunissa also led the fantasy film Jaadui Jhoola (1943), directed by A. M. Khan.

By the late 1940s, Zebunissa had shifted primarily to supporting roles. She portrayed Himalaywala's mother in Elaan (1947). In 1954, she attempted to reappear in a leading role with Alexandra Markey's Gandhi-path, but the film remained unfinished. Zebunissa's later credits include Sone Ki Chidiya (1958), Chaudhvin Ka Chand (1960), and Ram Aur Shyam (1967).

== Filmography ==
=== Silent films ===
According to the filmography presented in Light of Asia: Indian Silent Cinema, 1912–1934:

- Lakho Phulani (1926)
- Alladin Ane Jadui Fanas (1927)
- Alla Ka Pyara (1927)
- Nakli Rani (1927)
- Poonam No Chand (1927)
- Shiraj-Ud-Daula (1927)
- Amrit Ke Zer (1928)
- Gul Badan (1928)
- Karuna Kumari (1928)
- Maya Mahal (1928)
- Mayana Rang (1928)
- Raj Tarang (1928)
- Sarovarani Sundary (1928)
- Saundarya Sura (1928)
- Shashi Punhu (1928)
- Soni Mahiwal (1928)
- Anarbala (1929)
- Dilruba (1929)
- Madhu Bansari (1929)
- Maurya Patan (1929)
- Mirza Sahiba (1929)
- Nasib Na Nakhara (1929)
- Natun Janma (1929)
- Patal Padamini (1929)
- Ran Garjana (1929)
- Ranghelo Rajput (1929)
- Adale Jahangir (1930)
- Chabukne Chamkare (1930)
- Jalim Jadugarin (1930)
- Jigarna Gha (1930)
- Khuni Teer (1930)
- Rajdoot (1930) (also known as Beggar Meets Beggar)
- Surya Prabha (1930)
- Amar Yodho (1931)
- Bahadur Beti (1931)
- Dariai Devangana (1931)
- Hak Insaf (1931)
- Katto Dushman (1931)
- Mahasagar Nu Moti (1931)
- Uthavgir (1931)
- Rangilo Rajput (1932)

=== Sound films ===
- Gul Bakawali (1932)
- Saif-e-Sulemani (1934)
- Johar-e-Shamseer (1934)
- Bahar-e-Sulemani (1935)
- Kal Ki Baat (1937)
- Jaadui Jhoola (1943)
- Elaan (1947)
- Gandhi-path (1954) – unfinished
- Sone Ki Chidiya (1958)
- Chaudhvin Ka Chand (1960)
- Ram Aur Shyam (1967)

== Reception ==
Critic S. Ramamurthy of Varieties Weekly, writing a 1933 "star profile", praised Zebunissa particularly for her ability to portray sorrow, noting her expressive eyes, controlled physicality, and the tension she brought to such scenes. He regarded this controlled portrayal of grief as one of her "original talents".

Scholar Debashree Mukherjee notes that the screen personas of actresses such as Zebunissa, who came from a Muslim performing background, differed from those of the university-educated Hindu actresses who were then beginning to enter Indian cinema. Film historian Bhagwan Das Garga likewise characterized Zebunissa as a major screen seductress, writing:

Zebunissa ... with her large hazel eyes, she was the Indian screen's most celebrated temptress, casting a spell over her men. Whether in mythological, social or stunt films she was always the heavy-breathing seductress who succeeded in getting her man and then destroying him.
