= Jilloo =

Indian film actress

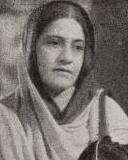
- Jilloo in the film Rupa
- Born: Zuleka Ebrahain; 1905; Bombay, India
- Died: 2004 (aged 98–99)
- Other names: Jilloobai, Jillo, Jillobai, Jillo Bai, Jilloo Bai, Zillu, Zilloo, Zilloobai, Miss Jillo, Miss Jilloo, Miss Tilloo
- Occupations: Actress, singer
- Years active: 1924–1960
- Notable work: Alam Ara; Mother India; Mughal-e-Azam

Jilloo was an Indian Hindi-language film actress born in 1905 in Bombay, India, as Zuleka Ebrahain. She acted in numerous Hindi films, including Mother India and Mughal-e-Azam, the two biggest commercial and critical successes of the 1950s. She portrayed the role of the mother-in-law of Radha, the protagonist of Mother India, and the mother of Anarkali, in Mughal-e-Azam. She also acted in several other films, including Madhosh and Alam Ara, India's first talkie film. As a young actress, she was credited as Jilloobai, Jillo, Jilloo, Zillu, Zilloo or Zilloobai. Later in her career she became known for portraying the role of mother in various movies earning her the name Jilloo Maa (mother in Hindi).,

== Filmography ==
- 1960: Mughal-e-Azam – Anarkali's mother
- 1957: Mother India – Sundar Chachi
- 1951: Madhosh – Soni's mother
- 1951: Sanam – Jogin's mother
- 1950: Magroor – Manohar's mother
- 1950: Sabak
- 1948: Parai Aag
- 1945: Tadbir
- 1945: Naseeb
- 1945: Phool
- 1945: Vikramaditya
- 1944: Gaali
- 1931: Alam Ara
- 1924: Chandragupta Aur Chanakya
- 1924: Razia Begum
- 1924: Shah Jehan
- 1924: Veer Durgadas
- 1947: Jugnu – Dilip Kumar's mother
- 1939: Pukar
