= Ezra Mir =

Indian documentary filmmaker (1903–1993)

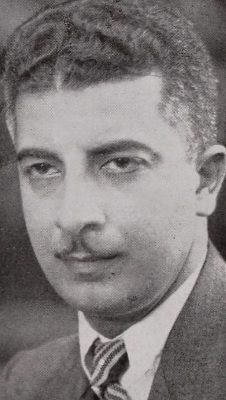
- Ezra Mir (1940)
- Born: Edwyn Myers; October 26, 1903; Calcutta
- Died: March 7, 1993 (aged 89); Bombay, Maharashtra, India
- Occupation(s): Director (films, documentary)
- Years active: 1924–1993

Ezra Mir (26 October 1903 – 7 March 1993) was an Indian film-maker, known for his documentary films.

Mir changed his Jewish birth name, Edwyn Meyers, to Ezra Mir on the advice of Edwine Carewe who was the producer at Dolores Del Rio unit of United Artistes for whom Mir had scripted the films 'Romana', 'Revenge' and 'Evangeline'. Also the name 'Ezra' was his childhood alias, and a Kashmiri surname would have been given to him because of his handsome appeal. After working originally as a stage actor, he moved to New York in 1924 and started working in film, first as an actor and then later as an editor. During this period he also made his first short film, The Symbolesque (1929).

Returning to India, Mir began directing films based on Hindi theatre. He made his first full length film in this genre, Noorjehan, for the Imperial Film Company in 1931, and subsequently Zarina and other films for the Sagar Movietone. He made a number of films for Madan Theatre Studios in the 1930s, and his most well-known work, Rickshawala, was produced by Ranjit Movietone. He then set up his own studio, Everest Pictures, in 1939.

During the 1940s, Mir joined the Film Advisory Board and began making documentary films. The three notable shorts he made for them were Making Money, The Road To Victory and the Voice of Satan in 1940. The Road To Victory was about the proclamation of dictatorship and was effectively directed and narrated by Mir. Voice of Satan was a two-reeler about the propaganda used by the Germans in their broadcasting methods. Both the war documentaries were a production of Wadia Movietone, a co-operative effort with the Film Advisory Board.

When the Advisory Board was replaced by Information Films of India, Mir continued to work for them, producing newsreels such as Indian News Parade. After the war, he continued documentary work, founding the Indian Documentary Producers Association in 1956, and worked on over 700 documentary films. Mir was appointed Chief Producer of the Ministry of Information's Films Division in 1956; under his management, the Division was highly prolific, releasing newsreels at the rate of one per week as well as over 100 documentary films per year. He was awarded the Padma Shri in 1970.

== Death ==
He died on 7 March 1993, in Mumbai.

== Filmography ==
As director

- The Symbolesque (1929)
- Noorjehan (1931)
- Zarina (1932)
- Premi Pagal (1933)
- Farzande Hind (1934)
