= J.J. Madan =

Indian film director

J. J. Madan was a theater business owner and film director in India. He was the third son of Indian film magnate Jamshedji Framji Madan who started Madan Theatres Ltd. in 1919. After his father died in 1923, J. J. Madan took over the management of Madan Theatres.

Indian-American actor Erick Avari is a great-grandson of J. J. Madan and great-great-grandson of J. F. Madan.

== Filmography ==
- The 1922 silent film version of the Savitri and Satyavan story, an Italian co-production directed by Giorgio Mannini and J. J. Madan produced by Madan Theatres Ltd and Cines.
- Laila organizations (1927 silent film) depicting Laila Majnu
- Shirin Farhad (1931)
- Zalim Saudagar (1941)
