= Madan Theatre =

Indian film company

- Founded: 1919
- Founder: Jamshedji Framji

Madan Theatre Company, also known as Madan Theatres Limited or Madan Theatres in short, was a film production company founded by Jamshedji Framji Madan & his partner Kanhaiyalal Kaushik, one of the pioneers of Indian Cinema.

== History ==
A young Parsi businessman, who had experience in theatre shows from an early age, Madan stepped into entertainment business in 1902, when he started bioscope shows of imported cinemas a tent in Maidan, Calcutta.

After World War I, Madan's Theatre business started growing rapidly. In 1919 pt Kanhaiyalal Kaushik joint hands with Jamshedji, his business became a joint stock company with the name of Madan Theatres Limited. Madan Theatres and its associates had a great control over theatre houses in India those days.

J. J. Madan, third son of Jamshedji Framji, became managing director of Madan Theatres after the death of his father in 1923. Madan Theatres reached a peak in late 1920s when it owned 127 theatres and controlled half of the country's box office. Madan Theatres produced a number of popular and landmark films till 1937.

== List of films ==
- Billwamangal (1919), Bengali feature film, screened in Cornwallis Theatre (now known as Sree Cinema).
- Nala Damayanti (1920), directed by Eugenio de Liguoro.
- Dhruva Charitra (1921), also directed by Eugenio de Liguoro.
- Ratnavali (1922), directed by Camille Le Grand.
- Savitri Satyavan (1923), directed by Georgio Mannini.
- Bishabriksha (1922 film) and 1928 film.
- Durgesh Nandini (1927 film) and Radharani (1930), both based on Bankim Chandra Chatterjee's works.
- Jugalanguriya (1929), Indira both directed by Jyotish Bannerjee based on Bankim Chandra Chatterjee's works
- Giribala (1929), based on Rabindranath Tagore's work.
- Mrinalini (1930 film), based on Bankim Chandra Chatterjee's works
- Jamai Shashthi (1931), Bengali short film as a talkie, was released on 11 April 1931.
- Indrasabha (1932), a musical with 72 songs.
