= List of Hindi films of 1942 =

This is a list of films produced by the Bollywood film industry based in Mumbai in 1942.

== Highest-grossing films ==
The six highest-grossing films at the Indian box office in 1942:

Rank	Title	Nett collection
1	Basant	₹80 lakh
2	Khandan	₹60 lakh
3	Bhukt Surdas	₹55 lakh
4	Jawab	₹45 lakh
5	Roti	₹40 lakh
6	Bharat Milap	₹38 lakh

== A-C ==
Title	Director	Cast	Genre	Notes
Aankh Michouli	R. S. Choudhury	Nalini Jaywant, Satish, Anand Prasad Kapoor, Sulochana, Jilloo, Pratima Devi, Hadi	Social	Music: Gyan Dutt; Lyrics: Pandit Indra, Satyakam Sharma, Shatir Ghaznavi
Amar Asha	Shailen Ghosh	Navin Yagnik, Kamla Varerkar, Devaskar, Bhim	Social	Music: Rattan Lal; Lyrics:
Apna Ghar	Debaki Bose	Shanta Apte, Mahesh Kaul, Chandra Mohan, Vimla Vashishta, Maruti, Maya Bannerji, Jeevan, David, Gope, Jagdish Sethi, Nimbalkar, Mishra	Social family drama	Music: Harishchandra Bali; Lyrics: Narottam Vyas
Apna Paraya	Ramchandra Thakur	Shahu Modak, Hansa Wadkar, Dulari, Kayam Ali, Sankatha Prasad, Shakuntala, Pesi Patel, Agha, Rajrani	Social	Music: Anil Biswas; Lyrics:
Armaan	Kidar Nath Sharma	Motilal, Meera, A. Shah, Shamim, Nagendra, Bhagwandas, Nazir Bedi, Rajinder Singh, Rajkumari A. Shah	Social	Music: Gyan Dutt; Lyrics: Kidar Sharma
Arzoo	M. Issa, R.M. Vaidya	Dhiraj Bhattacharya, Purnima, Panna	Social	Music: Lyrics:
Awaaz	Rafiq Rizvi	Maya Banerjee, Swarnalata, Wasti, Danve, Kailash, Anwaribai	Social	Music: K C Verma, S Navrekar; Lyrics: Ramesh Gupta, Kabil Amritsari
Bahana	A. M. Khan	Alaknanda, Yusuf Effendi, Benjamin, Ameena, Ansari, Rafiq, Nawaz, Shahzadi, Anwaribai, Haroon	Social	Music: M. Sagir Asif; Lyrics: A. M. Khan
Barat	Gunjal	Shobhana Samarth, Harish, Prakash, Kaushalya, Manmohan, Rampyari, Sankatha Prasad, Nayampalli, Mirza Musharraf, Vatsala Kumtekar	Social	Music: Master Ratanlal, Khemraj; Lyrics: Raghunath Brahmbhatt
Basant	Amiya Chakravarty	Ulhas, Mumtaz Shanti, Suresh, Kanu Roy, Pithawala, Baby Madhubala, Pramila	Social	Music: Pannalal Ghosh; Lyrics: Pyare Lal Santoshi
Bhakta Kabir	Rameshwar Sharma	Bharat Bhushan, Mehtab, Mazhar Khan, Ramesh Sinha, Padma Devi, Vanmali Das, Gyani, Rai Mohan	Biopic devotional	Music: Himanshu Dutta; Lyrics: Kabir, Pandit Shivkumar
Bhakta Surdas	Chaturbhuj Doshi	K. L. Saigal, Khursheed, Monica Desai, Nagendra, Gharpure, Kesarbai, B, Sharma, Bashir, M. Saigal	Biopic, drama	Music: Gyan Dutt; Lyrics: D. N. Madhok
Bharat Milap	Vijay Bhatt	Prem Adib, Shahu Modak, Shobhana Samarth, Durga Khote, Umakant, Vimala Vashishta, Shanta Kumari, Amirbai Karnataki, Ratanmala	Epic religious drama	Music: Shankar Rao Vyas; Lyrics: Tulsidas, Pandit Indra, Pandit Anuj, Baalam Pardesi
Blackout	Nari Ghadiali	Sadiq Ali, Benjamin, Sardar Mansur, Shobha, Bibìjan, Mukhtar, Mehdi Raza, Nazira, Habib	Action	Music: Ninu Majumdar; Lyrics: Waheed Qureshi
Bolti Bulbul	Dhirubhai Desai	Anil Kumar, Zebunissa, Mumtaz Begum, Sardar Mansur, Alaknanda, Mehr Sultana, Shahzadi, Mirajkar, S, Nazir, Samson	Action	Music: K. C. Verma; Lyrics: Safdar Aah, Kabil Amritsari, Shams Lakhnavi
Bombay Calling	Raja Yagnik	Navin Yagnik, Shirin, Agha, Bhim, Vatsala Kumtekar, Janardhan, Anant, Ghulam Rasool	Action	Music: Pratap Mukherjee; Lyrics: A Karim
Chandni	Jayant Desai	Khursheed, Ishwarlal, Kesari, Dixit, Noorjahan, Rajkumari Shukla, Baby Kamla	Social	Music: Khemchand Prakash; Lyrics: D. N. Madhok
Chauranghee	Sibtain Fazli, Nabendusundar	Mehtab, Sajjan, Nazir Kashmiri, Anees Khatoon, Amjad,		Music: Hanuman Prasad Sharma, Kazi Nazrul Islam; Lyrics: Mirza Ghalib, Jigar Moradabadi, Kazi Nazrul Islam, Arzu Lakhnavi
Chudiyan	L.J. Bhatt, K.J. Parmar	Prem Adib, Maya Bannerji, Jeevan, Mehr Sultana, Gulab		Music: S N Tripathi; Lyrics: Neelkanth Tiwari, Pandit Indra, Ramesh Gupta, Sharma

== D-J ==
Title	Director	Cast	Genre	Notes
Das Baje a.k.a. 10 O'Clock	Raja Nene	Paresh Bannerjee, Urmila Vasant Thengdi, Baby Shakuntala, Manaji Rao, Devraj, Shiraz	Romantic drama	Music: Keshavrao Bhole; Lyrics: Mukhram Sharma Ashant
Daughter of the Jungle a.k.a. Vanasundari	Ramanlal Desai	Sunetra, Baburao Pehalwan, Brijrani, Mirajkar, Bose, Amir Bano, Ali	Action adventure	Music: Shantaram Manjrekar; Lyrics: Ehsan Rizvi
Dhiraj	Chaturbhuj Doshi	Sitara Devi, Ishwarlal, Rajkumari Shukla, Kesari, Khatoon, Bhagwandas	Social	Music: Gyan Dutt; Lyrics: Pandit Indra
Dillagi	Balwant Bhatt	Hansa Wadkar, Kumar, Sushil Kumar, Anuradha, Agha	Social	Music: Pratap Mukherjee; Lyrics:
Dukh Sukh	Ram Daryani	Sitara Devi, Vasanti, Rama Shukul, Pratima Devi, Mukesh (actor), A, Shah, Khatoon, Mukesh	Social	Music: Khemchand Prakash; Lyrics: Wali Sahab
Duniya Ek Tamasha	Dwarka Khosla	Sardar Akhtar, W. M. Khan, Urmila, Gope, Shyam Sunder, Minoo Cooper, Devaskar	Social	Music: Lyrics:
Duniya Tumhari Hai	G.P. Pawar	Nandrekar, Kanta Kumari, Sadiq, Madhukar Gupte, N. A. Ansari	Social	Music: S. N. Tripathi; Lyrics: I. C. Kapoor
Ek Raat	Wahid-ud-din Zia-ud-din Ahmed	Prithviraj Kapoor, Nina, K. N. Singh, Mubarak, Prakash, Rajkumari Shukla, Firoza Begum, Gulab, Bibijan, Yusuf, Mumtaz	Social	Music: S. K. Pal; Lyrics: Pandit Indra
Fariyaad	Jayant Desai	Noor Jehan, Mubarak, Ishwarlal, Rama Shukal, Shamim, Alaknanda	Social	Music: Khemchand Prakash; Lyrics: D. N. Madhok
Farman	Nanubhai Vakil	Anil Kumar, Sarojini, W. M. Khan, Ranibala, Anwaribai, S. Nazir, Sadiq	Social	Music: Damodar Sharma; Lyrics: Ramesh Chandra Pandey, I. C. Kapoor, Harbans, Safdar Aah, Gaskar Delahari, Roopbani
Garib	Ramchandra Thakur	Surendra, Veena Kumari, N. A. Ansari, Rose, Agha	Social	Music: Anil Biswas, Ashok Ghosh; Lyrics: Safdar Aah, Pandit Indra (1)
Ghar Sansar a.k.a. Homelife	V.M. Vyas	Sardar Akhtar, Mazhar Khan, Nazir, Kajjan, Kalyani, Mirza Musharaf	Family social drama	Music: Shyam Babu Pathak; Lyrics:
Gora Kumbhar	Anand Kumar	Lalita Pawar	Biopic drama	Music: Lyrics:
Haso Haso Ai Duniyawallaon (Haso Haso Ae Duniya Walo)	Dwarka Khosla	Rattanbai, Devaskar, Gope, Shahzadi, Samson	Social	Music: First film as independent MD C. Ramchandra; Lyrics: Waheed Qureshi
Huma Gun Anmogaldi				
Jawab	P.C. Barua	Jamuna, Kanan Devi, Ratin Banerjee, P.C. Barua, Ahindra Choudhury, Devbala, Tulsi Chakraborty, Asit Baran, Bikram Kapoor	Social	Music: Kamal Dasgupta; Lyrics: Bekal, Buddhi Chandra Agrawal Madhur
Jawan Ki Pukar a.k.a. Call of Youth	Dinshaw Billimoria	D. Bilimoria, Urmila, Harish, Kalyani, Benjamin, W. M. Khan, Alaknanda, Afghan Sandow, Samson	Action	Music: Vasant Kumar Naidu; Lyrics: A. K. Sindhi
Jawani	Wajahat Mirza	Surendra, Husn Banu, Kayam Ali, Sankatha Prasad, Agha, A. R. Kabuli, Nawab, Dulari, Laddan	Social	Music: Anil Biswas; Lyrics: Mirza, Hazrat Aarzoo
Jhankar	S. Khalil	Chandra Mohan, Pramila, Kumar, Gope, Shahzadi, Altaf, Dulari, Shaukat, Ghulam Mohammed	Social	Music: Bashir Dehlvi; Lyrics: Arzu Lakhnavi, D. N. Madhok, Hasrat Lakhnavi
The Jungle Princess	Homi Wadia	Fearless Nadia, John Cawas, Shahzadi, Radharani	Action	Music: Madholal Damodar Master; Lyrics: Pandit Indra

== K-M ==
Title	Director	Cast	Genre	Notes
Kalakar	A. Karim	Maya Devi, Jal Merchant, Ranibala, Anant Marathe, Mehar Sultana, Fazlu, Saiyyad Ahmed, Fakir Mohammed	Social	Music: Bashir Dehlvi; Lyrics: A. Karim
Kaljug	Nazir	Nazir, Sitara Devi, Kumar, Gope, Anuradha, Majid, Azurie	Social drama	Music: Rafiq Ghaznavi; Lyrics: Hasrat Lakhnavi
Khamoshi	R. C. Talwar	Ramola, Amarnath, Gyani, Shyam Sunder (actor), Manorama, Nand Kishore, Sunder, Leela Mishra, Himmat Rai	Social	Music: G.A. Chishti; Lyrics: Himmat Rai Sharma
Khandaan	Shaukat Hussain Rizvi	Pran, Noor Jehan, Manorama, Ajmal. Durga Mota, Ghulam Mohammed, G. N. Butt, Ibrahim	Family drama	Music: Ghulam Haider; Lyrics: M. D. Taseer, Nazim Panipat and D. N. Madhok
Khilona a.k.a. Khilauna/The Toy	Sarvottam Badami	Snehprabha Pradhan, P. Jairaj, Prabha, Satish, Kanhaiyalal, Nagendra, Pratima Devi, Pesi Patel	Social	Music: Khemchand Prakash; Lyrics: Pandit Indra
Kirti	Gunjal	P. Jairaj, Lalita Pawar, Sunalini Devi, Jagdish Sethi, Sushil Kumar, Ghulam Rasool, Devaskar, Manchi Thuthi, Mithu Miya	Social	Music: Harishchandra Bali; Lyrics: Pandit Phani
Kisise Na Kehna	Keshavrao Date, Krishna Gopal	Leela Chitnis, Pahari Sanyal, Keshavrao Date, Sunetra, Hari Shivdasani, Shukla, Ghory	Social	Music: Pratap Mukherjee; Lyrics: Amritlal Nagar
Kiski Biwi	M. A. Mirza	E. Bilimoria, Kalyani Das, Anuradha, Himalayawala, Vatsala Kumtekar, Fenty Prasad, Gulab, Saiyad Ahmed, Afghan Sandow	Social	Music: Rafiq Ghaznavi; Lyrics: Balam
Kunwara Baap	Kishore Sahu	Protima Das Gupta, Baby Lal, Anjali Devi, Nana Palsikar, Amritlal Nagar, Moni Chatterjee, Dhulia, Hadi		Music: Ramchandra Pal; Lyrics: Amritlal Nagar, Baalam Pardesi, Satyakam Sharma
Lajwanti	Hiralal Doctor	Rattanbai, Anuradha, W. M. Khan, Ashiq Hussain, Fakir Mohammed	Social	Music: Shyam Babu Pathak; Lyrics:
Lalaji	Chamankant Gandhi, Lalit Mehta	Yashodhara Katju, Krishnakant, Yakub, Amar, Maya Devi, Abdul Rehman Kabuli, Sunalini Devi, Jagdish Dethi, Badri Prasad, Vatsala Kumtekar	Social drama	Music: Vasant Kumar Naidu; Lyrics: Mirza Ghalib, Arzu Lakhnavi, Neelkanth Tiwari
Mahakavi Kalidas	Niren Lahiri	Karunu Bannerjee, Chhabi Biswas, Ulhas, Menaka Devi, Padma Devi	Biopic	Music: Hariprasanna Das; Lyrics:
Maheman a.k.a. Guest	Chaturbhuj Doshi	Madhuri, Ishwarlal, Shamim, Rama Shukla, Kesari, Bhagwandas	Social	Music: Khemchand Prakash; Lyrics: D. N. Madhok
Malan	V. M. Vyas	Shanta Hublikar, Rattanbai, Balwant Singh, Jagdish Sethi, But Kashar, Kalyani, Mirza Musharraf, Alaknanda,	Social	Music: Shyam Babu Pathak; Lyrics: Ehsan Rizvi
Mamaji	Narottam Vyas	Lalita Pawar, Nandrekar, Yakub, Jeevan, Maruti, Misra, Nana Palsikar, Leela Pawar	Family social	Music: Harishchandra Bali; Lyrics: Narottam Vyas
Mamta	I.A. Hafizji	Prince Dara, Pushpa Rani, Kalawati, Padma Devi, Akbar, N. Mohammed, Puttan	Social	Music: R. A. Atra; Lyrics: G Shadani
Mata	Gunjal	Shobhana Samarth, Chandrakant, Mubarak, Urmila, Himalayawala, Munshi Khanjar, Bhudo Advani, Moti, Bibijan	Family drama	Music: Vasant Kumar Naidu; Lyrics: D. N. Madhok
Meenakshi	Modhu Bose	Sadhona Bose, Ahindra Choudhury, Rajlakshmi Devi, K. C. Dey, Najmal Hussain, Devbala, Sandhya Rani, Priti Majumdar, Panna Devi	Romantic melodrama	Music: Pankaj Mullick; Lyrics: Pandit Bhushan
Motorwali	A. M. Khan	Radharani, Prakash, Ameena, Sardar Mansur, Nazira, Haroon, Ranibala, Anwaribai, Rafiq	Action	Music: Damodar Sharma; Lyrics: Gaskar Delahari
Muqabala	Babubhai Mistri, Batuk Bhatt	Fearless Nadia, Yakub, Agha, Dalpat, Shrinivas, Rajni, Nazira, Jal Khambatta, Khan Mastana, Baby Madhuri	Double-role action drama	Music: Khan Mastana; Lyrics: A. Karim
My Village a.k.a. Mera Gaon	Prafulla Roy	Hansa Wadkar, P. Jairaj, K. C. Dey, Chhaya Devi, Amir Banu, S. L. Puri, Jagdish Sethi, Moti, Aghajani	Social	Music: K. C. Dey; Lyrics: Kavi Raghunath

== N-R ==
Title	Director	Cast	Genre	Notes
Nai Duniya	Abdul Rashid Kardar	P. Jairaj, Shobhana Samarth, Wasti, Mazhar Khan, Hari Shivdasani, Jeevan, Ram Avtar, Azurie	Social	Music: Naushad; Lyrics: Tanveer Naqvi, Rammurti Chaturvedi (1), A Shah Aziz (1)
Nari	Raja Yagnik	Trilok Kapoor, Lalita Pawar, Kamla Warekar, Anant Marathe, Urmila, Jilloo, Ghulam Rasool	Social	Music: Harishchandra Bali; Lyrics: Basheer Jamali, Pandit Phani
Nazrana	G. P. Kapoor	Mahipal, Anuradha, Lalita Devi, Ashiq Hussain, Jugal Kishore	Costume	Music: G. P. Kapoor; Lyrics: L. S, Mishra
Nishani	Roop K. Shorey	Ragini, Majnu, Rooplekha, Ranibala, Ghulam Qadir	Social	Music: Master Amarnath; Lyrics: Aziz Kashmiri
Parda Nasheen	I. A. Hafizji	Ram Dulari, Haseena, Girdhari, Nargis, Hanuman Prasad, Ganesh	Social	Music: R. A. Atra; Lyrics: A. W. Razi
Phir Milenge	Sohrab Modi	Sardar Akhtar, Sohrab Modi, Meena Shorey, K. N. Singh, Sadiq Ali, Athavale, Abu Bakar, E. Tarapore, Ghulam Hussain	Social	Music: Mir Sahib; Lyrics: Pandit Sudarshan
Pritam	Mohan Sinha	Maya Banerji, Shyam Sunder, Shanti, Ghulam Rasool, Munshi Khanjar, Rajinder Singh	Social	Music: Bhojak; Lyrics: Mohan Sinha
Pyara Watan	M. Udwadia	Benjamin, Alaknanda, Yashwant Dave, Samson, But Kashar, Kalyani	Costume action	Music: Shyam Babu Pathak; Lyrics: Kabil Amritsari
Raisaheb	S. M. Yusuf	Trilok Kapoor, Kaushalya, Rattanbai, Gope, Dalpat, Mirza Musharraf, Jagdish Sethi, Kesarbai, Mustafa, Bibijan	Social	Music: Baldev Nayak, Madhav Lal; Lyrics: Waheed Qureshi
Raja Rani	Najam Naqvi	Trilok Kapoor, Vanamala, Maya Devi, Sunalini Devi, Navin Yagnik, Mazhar Khan, David		Music: Khan Mastana; Lyrics: Pandit Anand Kumar
Return of Toofan Mail	Aspi Irani	Arun, Shamim, Brijmala, Jagdish Sethi, Dixit, Hari Shivdasani, Mehdi Raza, Bibijan, Azurie, Rewashankar, Firoz Dastur	Action	Music: Gyan Dutt; Lyrics: Pandit Indra
Roti	Mehboob Akhtar	Chandra Mohan, Akhtaribai Faizabadi, Sheikh Mukhtar, Sitara Devi, Ashraf Khan, Kayam Ali, Mirza, Nawab, Agha	Social	Music: Anil Biswas; Lyrics: Safdar Aah

== S ==
Title	Director	Cast	Genre	Notes
Sachcha Sapna	Madhav Kale	Rajkumari, Madhav Kale, Kumar, Ashalata	Social	Music: Annasaheb Mainkar; Lyrics: Ehsan Rizvi
Saheli	S. M. Yusuf	Pahari Sanyal, Rattanbai, Pramila, Jilloo, Rekha Devi, Aziz, Shahzadi, Sayed Ahmed	Social drama	Music: Bashir Khan Dehlvi; Lyrics: Waheed Qureshi
Sarovar Ki Sundari a.k.a. Lady of the Lake	A. M. Khan	Romila, Zebunissa, Ameena, Prakash, Benjamin, N. A. Ansari, Rafique, Shhzadi, Anwaribai, Haroon, S. Alam	Action, costume	Music: Damodar Sharma, Bashir Khan Dehlvi; Lyrics: Munshi Aashiq
Saugandh	Hemchandra Chunder	Pahari Sanyal, Chhabi Biswas, Tulsi Chakraborty, Bharati Devi, Asit Baran, Dar Kashmiri, Jahar Ganguly, Nemo, Supriya Mukherjee, Puttan	Social	Music: R. C. Boral; Lyrics: Pandit Natwar
Savera	V. C. Desai	Shobhana Samarth, Arun Kumar, Nirmala Devi, Yakub, Brijmala, Kesari, Nagendra, Kesari	Social	Music: Gyan Dutt; Lyrics: B. R. Sharma
Sewa	Dhirubhai Desai	Shanta Kumari, Zahur Raja, Shyam Sunder, Radharanu, Anwaribai, Prabhashankar	Social	Music: S. N. Tripathi, Biri Singh Dukha; Lyrics: G. S. Kapoor
Sharda	Abdul Rashid Kardar	Mehtab, Ulhas, Nirmala Devi, Wasti, Badri Prasad, Amir Banu, Shyam Kumar	Drama, family	Music: Naushad; Lyrics: D. N. Madhok
Sheikh Chilli	Kikubhai Desai	Moti, Navinchandra, Bose, Vasantrao Pehalwan, Kamala, Dhulia, S. L. Puri Ali, Azoorie, Bose	Comedy	Music: Khan Mastana, Damodar Sharma; Lyrics: Kikubhai Desai
Shobha	Kumarsen Samarth	Shobhana Samarth, Shahu Modak, Karan Dewan, Sulochana Chatterjee, Mubarak, David, Kusum Deshpande, Jal Khambata, Vimal Sardesai	Social	Music: Vasant Desai lyrics: Pandit Indra
Society	Nazir	Sitara Devi, Nazir, Rajkumari Shukla, Gope, Alaknanda, Janardhan Sharma	Social	Music: Rafiq Ghaznavi; Lyrics: Hasrat Lakhnavi
Station Master	Chimanlal Luhar	Prem Adib, Kaushalya, Suraiya, Jagdish Sethi, Ratnamala, Amirbai Karnataki, Umakant, Gulab, Shakir, Pratima Devi, Jeevan	Social	Music: Naushad; Lyrics: Rammurti Chaturvedi, Pyare Lal Santoshi, Pandit Indra, B. R. Sharma
Suhagan	Jagatrai Pesumal Advani	Jehanara Kajjan, Kumar, Radharani, Kalyani Das, Jilloo, Bhudo Advani, Kesarbai, Mirza Musharraf	Social family drama	Music: Shanti Kumar Desai; Lyrics: M. R. Kapoor
Sukhi Jeevan	Bhagwan, Harishchandra	Bhagwan, Ashalata, Harishchandra, Nazira, Bibijan, W. M. Khan, Shyam Kumar, Samson	Social	Music: Ram Chitalkar; Lyrics: M. R. Kapoor
Swaminath	Wajahat Mirza	Shobhana Samarth, Prem Adib, Keki Adajania, Majid, K. N. Singh, Bibjan, Jilloo	Social	Music: B. N. Bali
Swapna	Zia Sarhadi	E. Billimoria, Kaushalya, Balwant Singh, Alaknanda, Bhudo Advani	Social	Music: Shanti Kumar; Lyrics: Tanveer Naqvi

== T-Z ==
Title	Director	Cast	Genre	Notes
Tamanna	Phani Majumdar	Nargis, Suraiya, P. Jairaj, Leela Desai, Karan Dewan, Jagdish Sethi, K C Dey, Shanta Kumari	Social	Music: K. C. Dey; Lyrics: S K Kalla
Tamasha	Dwarka Khosla	Sardar Akhtar, Devaskar, W. M. Khan, Urmila Devi, Gope, Minoo Cooper, Samson	Social	Music: Pratap Mukherjee; Lyrics: Waheed Qureshi
Ujala	K. M. Multani	Naseem Banu, Prithviraj Kapoor, Mubarak, Jillani, Rattanbai, Mirza Musharraf, Khan Mastana	Social	Music: Bashir Dehlvi; Lyrics:
Uljhan	N.R. Acharya	Sardar Akhtar, Mazhar Khan, Anjali Devi, Bhim, Amritlal, Rajkumari Shukla, Krishnakant Amir Banu	Social	Music: Ramchandra Pal
Ulti Ganga	Keshavrao Dhaiber	Paresh Bannerjee, E. Tarapore, Brijrani, Sadat Ali, Mehboob Khan, Gulab, Pramila, Abu Bakar, Athavale, Putlibai	Social	Music: G. D. Kapoor; Lyrics: Munshi Abdul Baki
Vasantsena	Gajanan Jagirdar	Gajanan Jagirdar, Shahu Modak, Vanamala, Sunalini Devi, Vimla Tripathi, E. Tarapore, Navin Yagnik, Raj Vishwas, Nazir Bedi	Drama	Based on the play Mricchakatika (The Toy Cart) around 2nd to 5th century. Music: Master Krishnarao; Lyrics: Neelkanth Tiwari, D. N. Madhok
Vijay	Mohan Sinha	Durga Khote, Harish, Husn Banu, N. A. Ansari, Maya Devi, Sankatha Prasad, Agha	Social	Music: Anil Biswas; Lyrics: Safdar Aah
Yaad	Mazhar Khan	Veena, Satish Batra, Mazhar Khan, Agha, Azurie, Shahzadi, Devaskar, Ram Avtar, Hadi	Social	Music: Datta Naik; Lyrics: Arzu Lakhnavi
Zamindar	Moti B. Gidwani	Shanta Apte, Manorama, Ghulam Mohammed, Azmal, M. Esmail, S. D. Narang, Khairati, Durga Mota	Social	Music: Ghulam Haider; Lyrics: Qamar Jalalabadi
Zevar	K. Amarnath	E. Bilimoria, Jayant, Indurani, Veena, Rajkumari, Jagan, Mirajkar, Badri Prasad, Rama Shukal	Action	Music: Pandit Badri Prasad; Lyrics: D. N. Madhok
