= Bhudo Advani =

Indian cinema character-actor and comedian

- Born: Daulatram Advani; 17 August 1905; Hyderabad, Bombay Presidency, British India (present-day Sindh, Pakistan)
- Died: 25 July 1985 (aged 79); Bombay, Maharashtra, India
- Occupation: Actor
- Years active: 1933–1977

Bhudo Advani (17 August 1905 – 25 July 1985) was an Indian character actor and comedian. He started his acting career in theatre with the notion of spreading awareness on social issues. He came to Bombay on the advice of an Ajanta Cinetone representative and was offered a role in the film Afzal, also called Hoor-E-Haram in 1933, directed by Mohan Bhavnani. He later joined Sagar Movietone, becoming an important fixture in most films produced by them. He turned from character roles to comedy performing in Dr. Madhurika (1935), directed by Sarvottam Badami, Deccan Queen (1936) and Do Diwaane (1936), by C. Luhar.

Advani also became a vital part in director Mehboob Khan's films, acting in all the pictures directed by Mehboob while at Sagar Movietone. When Sagar shut down in 1939, Mehboob formed his own production company, National Studios, Bhudo Advani become a member there, but by the beginning of the 1940s, Advani was doing freelance work. In a career spanning forty-four years from 1933 to 1977, he acted in over ninety films. Belonging to the Sindhi community, Advani, along with Moti Prakash and S. P. Menghani, helped toward the development and formation of the Sindhi theatre in 1961.

His later memorable roles were in some of Raj Kapoor's films such as Boot Polish (1954), in which he lip-synced to the song "Lapak Jhapak Tu Aa Re Badariya", sung by Manna De in Raga Adhana, also in Shri 420 (1955) and Ab Dilli Dur Nahin (1957). His last film was Shatranj Ke Khilari (1977), made by Satyajit Ray.

== Early life ==
Bhudo Advani was born Daulatram Advani, on 17 August 1905, in Hyderabad, Sindh (now in Pakistan), British India. Following his matriculation exams, he spent his holidays staging plays based on social issues, which were of prime importance to him. During this time, he performed a play in which he had to portray an old man, "Buddha" or "Buddho" (a colloquial reference for an old man). Another reason for his name, Bhudo (old man), was due to his toothless smile; his edentia reportedly was caused by a hereditary disorder. The name stuck, and he was referred to as Bhudo Advani in film credits instead of Daulatram.

He was spotted by a representative of Ajanta Cinetone, who saw him in a play and asked Advani to come to Bombay and join films. Advani left Hyderabad and went to Bombay, where he was given a role in Afzal (1933).

== Career ==
Following his debut in Afzal or Hoor-E-Haram (1933), directed by Mohan Bhavnani, Advani worked in an administrative capacity in the production company while also acting in several movies produced by Ajanta Cinetone. Some of the films he acted in were Maya Jaal (1933), a fantasy directed by Shanti L. Dave for Ajanta Cinetone Ltd., co-starring Bibbo, Master Nissar and P. Jairaj; Dard-E-Dil (1934); Dukhtare-E-Hind (1934); The Mill, also called Mazdoor (1934), directed by Mohan Bhavnani, and starring Bibbo, who played the mill owner's daughter in the film, with Motilal as the hero; and Sair-E-Paristan (1934), directed by Bhavnani and co-starring Bibbo, P. Jairaj and Khalil.

He left Ajanta Cinetone following an offer from Chimanlal Desai and Dr. Patel to join Sagar Movietone. Here he had the opportunity to work with directors such as Sarvottam Badami, Mehboob Khan and K. P. Ghosh. He became popular doing comedy roles and worked in over twenty films produced by them. Some of his films with Mehboob Khan were: Manmohan (1936), a film made to compete with Calcutta's New Theatres Ltd's Devdas, starring Surendra and Bibbo, and was a commercial success at the box-office; Deccan Queen, an action adventure film directed by Mehboob; the first "stunt" film from Sagar Movietone – Jagirdar (1937), a "romantic melodrama", with Bibbo and Surendra co-starring with Motilal; and in 1938, Gramaphone Singer, with Bibbo and Surendra, directed by V. C. Desai and R. Thakur, who were referred to as "juniors" in Sagar at the time of production of this film. The music was by Anil Biswas with dialogues by Zia Sarhadi.

In Raj Kapoor's Boot Polish (1954), Advani sings "Lapak Jhapak Tu Aa Re Badariya". The scene is referred to by author Rahaim, as an example of a "model of stillness", where the singer holds the tone with the audience watching awe-struck in frozen silence. The song, composed in Raga Adhana had Manna De providing play-back for Advani.

In 1958, Advani acted in the Sindhi film Rai Daich, based on a folk story about the king of Junagadh, Rai Daich. It was produced by Atu Lalwani and D. P. Kriplani and directed by J. B. Lulla. With lyrics by Parsram Zia, the film became popular due to its music, which was composed by Bulo C. Rani. He acted in several films till 1977, in small roles. In 1977, he acted in his last feature film Shatranj Ke Khiladi, based on a short story written by Munshi Premchand. The ensemble cast included Sanjeev Kumar, Saeed Jaffrey, Shabana Azmi, Richard Attenborough, Tom Alter, Victor Bannerjee and Farooq Sheikh. Produced by Suresh Jindal, it was directed by Satyajit Ray for Hindi cinema.

== Death ==
Bhudo Advani died on 25 July 1985, in Bombay, Maharashtra, India.

== Filmography ==
Partial list:

Year	Film	Director	Producer
1933	Afzal a.k.a. Hoor-E-Haram	Mohan Bhavanani	Ajanta Cinetone Ltd.
1933	Maya Jaal a.k.a. Satan Weeps or Jung-E-Ulfat	Shanti Dave	Ajanta Cinetone Ltd.
1934	Shahi Gawaiya a.k.a. The Royal Musician or Vasavadatta	P. Y. Altekar	Ajanta Cinetone Ltd.
1934	Sair-E-Paristan	Mohan Bhavanani	Ajanta Cinetone Ltd.
1934	Dard-E-Dil a.k.a. Romance	Mohan Bhavanani	Ajanta Cinetone Ltd.
1934	Mazdoor a.k.a. The Mill	Mohan Bhavanani	Ajanta Cinetone Ltd.
1935	Pyar Ki Maar a.k.a. The Onslaught Of Love	A. P. Kapoor	Ajanta Cinetone Ltd.
1935	Dr. Madhurika	Sarvottam Badami	Sagar Movietone
1936	Deccan Queen	Mehboob Khan	Sagar Movietone
1936	Manmohan	Mehboob Khan	Sagar Movietone
1937	Jagirdar a.k.a. Landlord	Mehboob Khan	Sagar Movietone
1938	Gramophone Singer	V. C. Desai	Sagar Movietone
1938	Dynamite	C. M. Luhar	Sagar Movietone
1939	Seva Samaj, a.k.a. Service Ltd.	C. M. Luhar	Sagar Movietone
1939	Ladies Only	Sarvottam Badami	Sagar Movietone
1940	Kum Kum The Dancer	Modhu Bose	Sagar Movietone
1940	Pooja	A. R. Kardar	National Studios
1941	Nai Roshni	Lalit Mehta, Chimankant Gandhi	National Studios
1941	Bahen a.k.a. Sister	Mehboob Khan	National Studios
1942	Mata a.k.a. Mother	V. M. Gunjal	Kirti Pictures
1943	Fashion	S. F. Hasnain	Fazli Brothers
1944	Bisvi Sadi (Biswi Sadi)	Mohan Bhavnani	Bhavnani Productions
1945	Pehli Nazar	Mazhar Khan	Mazhar Art Productions
1946	Anmol Ghadi	Mehboob Khan	Mehboob Productions
1947	Shahkar a.k.a. The Masterpiece	S. Khalil	United Films
1948	Anokhi Ada	Mehboob Khan	Mehboob Productions
1949	Duniya	S. F. Hasnain	Fazli Brothers
1950	Meena Bazaar	Ravindra Dave	Pancholi Productions
1950	Aankhen (Ankhen)	Devendra Goel	Devendra Cine Corporation
1951	Saudagar	M. I. Dharmsey	West Hind Pictures
1952	Khubsurat	S. F. Hasnain	Fazli Brothers
1954	Boot Polish	Prakash Arora	R. K. Films
1955	Shri 420	Raj Kapoor	R. K. Films
1955	Pyaase Nain	S. Ram	Tekchand Talkies
1956	Kismet Ka Khel	Kishore Sahu	Sahu Films Ltd.
1957	Miss Bombay	Kedar Kapoor	N. C. Films
1957	Ab Dilli Dur Nahin	Amar Kumar	R. K. Films
1958	Madhumati	Bimal Roy	Bimal Roy Productions
1959	Qaidi No. 911	Aspi	Super Pictures
1960	Anuradha	Hrishikesh Mukherjee	L. B. Films
1963	Bachpan	Nazar	New Panch Ratan Pictures
1969	Khamoshi	Asit Sen	Geetanjali Pictures
1977	Shatranj Ke Khiladi	Satyajit Ray	Suresh Jindal
