= Ashalata Biswas =

Indian actress (1917–1992)

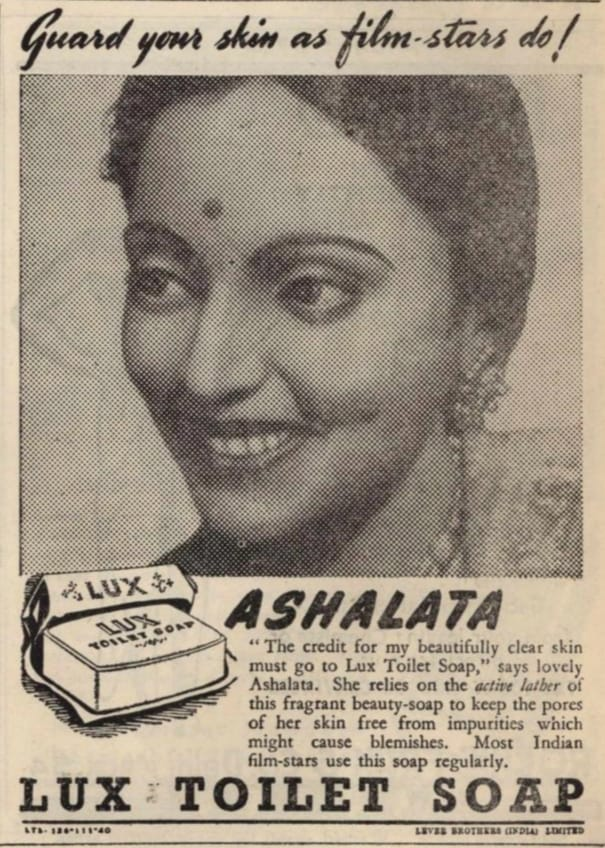
- Ashalata in an advertisement of Lux (1944)
- Born: Mehrunnisa; 1917; Kutch, Gujarat, British India
- Died: 1992 (aged 74–75)
- Occupations: Actress; producer
- Spouse: Anil Biswas (m. 1936; sep. 1954)
- Children: 4
- Relatives: Parul Ghosh (sister-in-law); Pannalal Ghosh (brother-in-law); Paromita Vohra (granddaughter)

Ashalata Biswas (born as Mehrunnisa; 1917–1992) was an Indian film actress and producer who was predominantly active in Hindi cinema from the 1930s to the mid-1960s. She was one of the first Indian actresses to become brand ambassador of Lux.

Ashalata was the first wife of music composer Anil Biswas, with whom she was married for 18 years and had four children.

== Early life and marriage ==
Ashalata was born as Mehrunnisa in 1917 in Kutch, in a Gujarati Muslim family. One of her childhood friends was Shobhna Samarth, who would also go on to become an actress in Hindi films.

In 1936, Ashalata married music composer Anil Biswas and underwent religious conversion to become a follower of Arya Samaj. The couple went on to have four children: Pradeep, Amit, Utpal, and Shikha; and separated in 1954. In 1961, their son Pradeep, an IAF cadet, died in a plane crash.

== Career ==
Ashalata began her acting career in mid-1930s, featuring in a string of films including Azadi (1935), Sajiv Murti (1935) and Insaaf (1936). In 1936, she played Shanti Devi in Manmohan, which was a commercial success. Ashalata went on to star in the big-budget fantasy drama film Jwala (1938) as Kuntala, a character derived from the witches of Macbeth. The film proved to be a major flop. She later had a supporting role in the 1940 musical Zindagi, which became the highest-grossing Indian film at the time of its release. Her other notable roles of this period include Geeta (1940) as Lata. She starred alongside Prithviraj Kapoor in Deepak (1940).

=== Variety Productions ===
In 1950s, Ashalata shifted from acting to producing, and co-founded a production house, Variety Productions, along with her husband. Their early releases were Mehmaan (1950) and Bazooband (1951); both films underperformed commercially.

In 1951, Ashalata produced Badi Bahu, written by Ramanand Sagar, which won Best Story award at the Mussoorie Film Festival.

== Public image ==
Ashalata was one of the major female film stars of 1930s. Besides acting, she sang her own songs in some films such as Premveer (1936), and also featured multiple times in the singing programs of All India Radio in late 1930s.

Ashalata often drew attention for her perceived beauty. She was among the fewest actresses of her time to feature in the much coveted advertisements of Lux.

== Death and legacy ==
Ashalata died of old age in 1992.

Her second son Utpal Biswas became a music director, and composed music for films such as Shahenshah (1988) and Share Bazaar (1997). Documentary filmmaker Paromita Vohra is Ashalata's granddaughter through her daughter Shikha Vohra (née Biswas).

== Filmography ==
- Azadi (1935)
- Sajiv Murti (1935)
- Sati Toral (1935)
- Bulldog (1936)
- Insaaf (1936)
- Mahageet (1936)
- Premveer (1936)
- Manmohan (1936) as Shanti
- Jwala (1938) as Kuntala
- Aaj Ki Duniya (1940)
- Deepak (1940) as Bina
- Desh Bhakta (1940)
- Geeta (1940) as Lata
- Rangila Jawan (1940)
- Shamsherbaaz (1940)
- Sohag (1940) as Kamla
- Zindagi (1940) as Ratan's friend's mistress (credited as "Asalata")
- Madhusudan (1941)
- Sachcha Sapna (1942)
- Sukhi Jeevan (1942)
- Humari Baat (1943)
- Swarna Bhoomi (1944)
- Char Aankhen (1944)
- Bisvi Sadi (1945)
- Shreeman Funtoosh (1965)
- Biradari (1966)

=== As producer ===
- Mehmaan (1950)
- Bazooband (1951)
- Badi Bahu (1951)
