= Raghunath Brahmbhatt =

Indian writer (1892–1983)

- Born: 13 December 1892; Linch, Mehsana, British India
- Died: 11 July 1983 (aged 90); Nadiad, Gujarat, India
- Occupations: Poet, playwright
- Spouse: Manibahen (m. 1904)

Raghunath Tribhuvandas Brahmbhatt (13 December 1892 – 11 July 1983) was an Indian Gujarati-language poet, playwright and lyricist, widely known in literary and theatre circles as Rasakavi (lit. "poet of rasa"). He was active during the early to mid-20th century and contributed significantly to Gujarati theatre and cinema.

== Early life ==
Raghunath Brahmbhatt was born to Tribhuvandas and Mohiba on 13 December 1892 in Linch, a village in British India (now in Mehsana district of Gujarat, India). He completed his primary and higher secondary education till fifth grade at Nadiad. He married Manibahen in 1904.

In his early years, he worked in a hospital before turning to a career in theatre and literature. His interest in drama led him to write plays and songs that were later staged by several Gujarati theatre companies. At the age of 17, he started his playwright career in Gujarati theatre with the hit play Buddhadev, which was later staged by Arya Subodh Natak Mandali, a theatre troupe from Morbi.

== Career ==
Brahmbhatt wrote more than twenty-five plays, many of which drew upon mythological and historical themes, while others were adaptations of contemporary novels. His works include Buddhadev (1914), based on Ashwaghosha's Buddhacharita; Shringi Rishi (1914) inspired by Nhanalal's Jaya-Jayant; Ajatshatru; Ashok; Suryakumari (1916); Chhatravijay (1919); Ushakumari (1921); and Snehamudra (1926). He also adapted Govardhanram Tripathi's novel Saraswatichandra for the stage.

In addition to plays, he composed more than a hundred songs for Gujarati theatre, many of which gained popularity with audiences. His lyrical compositions were especially noted for their emphasis on shringara rasa (the aesthetic of love and romance). His writing style combined classical Sanskrit dramaturgical elements with contemporary sensibilities, making his works accessible yet rooted in tradition.

"Saibo Maro Gulab no Chhod" for play Hansakumari and "Rasila Premi Na Haiya" for play Shalivahan are among his popular songs.

He wrote the song "Mohe Panghat Pe Nandlal Chhed Gayo Re" for the Gujarati play Chhatra Vijay in 1920. It was performed live by master Mukund during the play's run in the theatre, and was also recorded by The Twins, a gramophone company. When the Hindi epic film Mughal-e-Azam directed by K. Asif was released in 1960, Brahmbhatt's song was used in the film, but credited to Shakeel Badayuni. A viewer informed the Pakistani daily Dawn that the song had been copied. Brahmbhatt approached the director for copyright infringement and later filed a complaint with the Film Writers' Association and received a compensation of Rs 11,000 as royalty. In 2004, Raj Brahmbhatt, grandson of Brahmbhatt, signed an agreement with the film's producer, Shapoorji Pallonji's Sterling Investment Corporation Limited, which acknowledged and credited Raghunath Brahmbhatt as a lyricist on the covers of the home video released by the company. He was also acknowledged as the song's lyricist when the film was re-released in color on 12 October 2004.

In 1944, Brahmbhatt was honoured in Mumbai by the Desi Natak Samaj for his contributions to Gujarati theatre.

In 1955, he published Smaran-Manjari, a memoir chronicling the growth of Gujarati theatre between 1910 and 1940. He had also written articles on the subjects of theatre. His other literary works include : Prachin Bharatni Vibhutio, a collection of biographical essays about prominent figures from ancient India; Buddhadev: Trianki Natak; Devo, Rishio ane Pratapi Purusho and Suman Saurabh.

He died on 11 July 1983 in Nadiad.

== Filmography ==
=== Hindi films ===
Brahmbhatt contributed to several Hindi films as a lyricist.

- Do Deewane (1936)
- Mera Gaon (1942)
- Baraat (1942)
- Ashirwad (1943)
- Bhakta Bilwamangal (1948)
- Rupsundari (1949)
- Mughal-e-Azam (1960)

=== Gujarati films ===
- Sansar Leela (1934)
- Do Diwane (1936)
- Jivan Palto (1948)

== Theater ==
Brahmbhatt wrote more than twenty-five Gujarati plays.

- Buddhadev
- Shrungi-Rishi (1914)
- Sooryakumari (1916)
- Chhatravijay (1919)
- Ushakumari (1921)
- Snehmudra (1926)
- Ajatshatru
- Bhavi-prabalya
- Ashok
- Sarasvatichandra
- Naveenyug
- Anarkali
- Lakshminarayan
- Premvijay
- Kalyanraj
- Amarkirti
- Sansarna Rang
- Shrimant Bajirao

== See also ==
- List of Gujarati-language writers
