= Agents of Ishq =

Indian website about sexuality

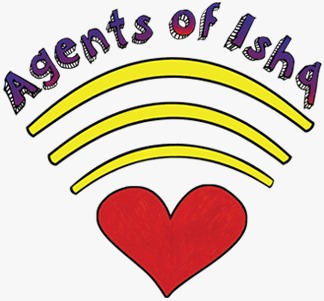
- Founded: 2014
- Country of origin: India
- Founder: Paromita Vohra
- Website: https://agentsofishq.com/

Agents of Ishq is an Indian website about sexuality, love and desire. It was founded in 2014 by filmmaker, writer and artist Paromita Vohra, whose aim was to "create a positive and enabling conversation around sex", including different sexual orientations. The website is run by Parodevi Pictures, an independent media and arts company based in Mumbai.

== Content ==
Agents of Ishq is intended to provide a comprehensive sex education, using videos, graphics, comics, maps, arts and podcasts. Topics include relationships, dating, sex, and consent, within the framework of Indian culture. It draws on popular culture, including Bollywood style music videos and ancient erotic art. The website also contains teaching modules for schools and educators. The site is bilingual, with material in Hindi and English.

== Projects ==
Agents of Ishq have produced several short film for their website. In 2016, they created an educational movie called Main Aur Meri Body, in collaboration with the NGO SNEHA in Dharavi, Mumbai. The same year they made a short film on the issue of sexual consent in collaboration with the lavani dance group Sangeet Bari, called The Amorous Adventures of Shakku and Megha in the Valley of Consent. The video also features actor and comedian Gaurav Gera. In March 2020, Agents of Ishq released another film with lavani dancers, Aika To The Baika: Police Complaint Lavani. The theme of the film, which was created in collaboration with the feminist legal centre Majlis, is how gender bias and misogyny can make it difficult for women to report sexual harassment or assaults, as women are often told that they will dishonour their families if they make such reports.

In 2021, Agents of Ishq, along with The YP Foundation, organized a 3-day digital conference called Love, Sex and Data (LSD) conference. They have also partnered with Oxfam India.
