= Surendra (actor) =

Indian singer-actor (1910–1987)

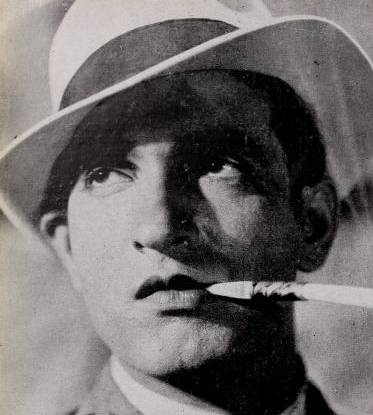
- Surendra in Dynamite (1938)
- Born: Surendra Nath Sharma; 11 November 1910; Batala, Gurdaspur District, Punjab, British India
- Died: 11 September 1987 (aged 76); Bombay, Maharashtra, India
- Occupations: Actor, singer
- Years active: 1936–1986
- Spouse: Satya Rishi

Surendra (11 November 1910 – 11 September 1987; Surendra Nath Sharma) was an Indian singer-actor of Hindi films. Known by his mononym, Surendra was born and educated in Punjab to be a lawyer by profession. He came to Bombay to become a singer on the recommendation of a Delhi distributor and his friends. He was "picked" by Mehboob Khan whom he met at Sagar Movietone, to sing and act in films as an alternative to the then Calcutta-based singer-actor, K. L. Saigal. Surendra started his career with his debut starring role in Deccan Queen (1936), directed by Mehboob Khan. He soon became a part of Sagar Movietone when his song "Birha Ki Aag Lagi More Man Mein" from the film became an "instant hit".

== Early life ==
Surendra was born on 11 November 1910, in Batala, Gurdaspur District, Punjab British India. His father's name was Ralia Ram Sharma. While in school, Surendranath, as he was then called, took part in concerts and earned the "reputation" of a singer. Surendra completed his education in 1935, from the Punjab University, in Ambala, which was at that time a part of Punjab. He got his B.A., LL.B degree and started preparing to work as a lawyer in Punjab. He was "spotted" by the then leading distributor from Delhi, Lala Alopi Prashad who encouraged the young Surendra to join films. On the instigation of his friends who wanted him to try his luck in films as a singer, he left Punjab and came to Bombay, where he met Mehboob Khan.

Surendra's parents were against the idea of his joining films, but on being persuaded they agreed, stipulating that Surendra's name in the credit roll of the films should appear as "Surendra Nath B.A., LL.B", a condition agreed to by Mehboob Khan.

== Career ==
=== 1930s ===
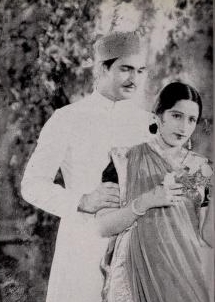
Surendra and Bibbo in Dynamite (1938)

Mehboob Khan, who had made a commercially successful film Al Hilal in 1935, is credited for bringing Surendra into films. He offered him the leading role in Deccan Queen (1936), which was produced by Sagar Movietone. Khan also chose the singular name Surendra, which was to stay as his screen name. Deccan Queen, with music by Anil Biswas, was a story about a police inspector played by Surendra, who has twin sisters fall in love with him. A song sung by Surendra "Birha Ki Aag Lagi", which according to author Ashok Raj, was a "rehash" of K. L. Saigal's song from Devdas (1935), "Baalam Aaye Baso", became extremely popular. The other notable song from this film was a popular ghazal sung by Surendra "Yaad Na Kar Dil-e-Haseen Bhooli Hui Kahaniyan".

In 1936, Khan wanted to make a film in Bombay, that would rival Calcutta's Devdas. Manmohan (1936), directed by Khan had Surendra once again in the lead. Zia Sarhadi wrote the story, script and dialogues for the film. Though referred to as the "poor man's Devdas" the film went on to become a big hit. The third film in 1936 was Sagar's Grama Kanya, directed by Sarvottam Badami. The film had Surendra starring opposite Sabita Devi and Aruna Devi. The music of the film, composed by the famous bhajan singer Shankarrao Khatu became popular with the public.

In 1938, while working for Gramophone Singer Surendra met with a car accident and had to be hospitalised. The film's shooting was halted for a few days. Gramophone Singer was Ramachandra Thakur's debut directorial venture, which he co-directed with V. C. Desai. The film had music composed by Anil Biswas. It was cited as a "music-dominated" love triangle starring Surendra with Bibbo and Prabha, who played the role of his wife. Following the release of the film, Surendra and Bibbo became a popular pair and worked together in several films together. Surendra's song "Ek Chhota Sa Mandir Banaya Hua Hai" went on to become popular.

=== 1940s ===
Surendra and Suraiya in 1857 (1946)

In 1940, Mehboob Khan produced Aurat under the banner of his National Studios. Mehboob was to later remake Aurat as Mother India in 1957. In Aurat, he cast Surendra as the older brother, a role to be played by Rajendra Kumar in Mother India. Yakub was cast as the younger brother Birju, with Sardar Akhtar playing the mother's role. The song "Utth Sajni Khol Kiware, Tere Sajan Aye Duware", sung by Surendra and Jyoti went on to become a "big hit", with Baburao Patel, editor of the cine-magazine Filmindia claiming that "Surendra had never sung better" in the June 1940 issue.

Ali Baba (1940) had Surendra starring in the title role, with Sardar Akhtar and Waheedan Bai. The film was a bilingual, made both in Hindi and Punjabi, with Surendra playing the double role of Alibaba and his son. The popular song from this film was "Hum Aur Tum Aur Ye Khushi Ye Kehkahe Ye Dillagi", sung by Surendra and Waheedan.

In 1940, it was reported by Baburao Patel, editor of Filmindia in the June 1940 issue that Surendra had fallen off a horse while riding at the Bombay Turf Club lawns. He was hospitalised for several months. Rumours surfaced at that time that Surendra had retired from acting. However, quashing the report in the news, Surendra returned after almost ten months to complete his films. He was left with a limp that remained for the rest of his life.

Following a hiatus of two years he went on to act in Jawani (1942), directed by Wajahat Mirza. In 1943, he acted in Paigham, directed by music director Gyan Dutt, Vish Kanya, by Kidar Sharma and Vishwas, by Homi Wadia.

In 1944, Surendra acted in three films, Lal Haveli, Bhatruhari and Miss Devi. The first two were successful films of 1944. Lal Haveli starred him opposite the then reigning singer-actress Noor Jehan. Directed by K. B. Lall, it had music by Mir Sahib with the duet "Dil Le Ke Mukar Na Jaana, Nazuk Hai Bahut Zamana", sung by Noor Jehan and Surendra and two solos songs by Surendra, "Yehi Fiqar Hai Shyam Pichale Savere" and "Kyun Man Dhoondhe Prem Nadi Ka Kinara" becoming successful. Bhatruhari, also called Raja Bhatruhari, directed by Chaturbhuj Doshi, had music composed by Khemchand Prakash. The popular songs were "Bhanwara Madhuban Mein Ja", Prem Bina Sab Soona", Bhiksha De De Maa" and "Allah Naam Ras Pina Prani".

1946 had Surendra and Noor Jehan starring again with a third singer-actress Suraiya, in what was to be the highest-grossing film of that year, Anmol Ghadi. Directed by Mehboob Khan for his Mehboob Productions, it had music composed by Naushad. According to journalist and author Rauf Ahmed in his book Mehboob Khan, Mehboob had initially decided not to cast Surendra as the male lead in Anmol Ghadi, due to a misunderstanding created by the head of Ranjit Studios, Chandulal Shah. The role was written with Surendra in mind, and in an interview with journalist-author Bunny Reuben, for his book Mehboob, India's Demille: The First Biography Surendra stated that a frustrated Mehboob, unable to find the right man to enact the role told Faredoon Irani, his cinematographer, "it's really Surendra who should be doing this role". Faredoon Irani asked Mehboob to pick up the phone and patch-up with Surendra, which he did. Surendra's "pathos-ridden" "Kyun Yaad Aa Rahein Hain" has "stood the test of time". Surendra's other solo "Ab Kaun Hai Mera", and a duet with Noor Jehan "Awaaz De Kahan Hai" also became "big hits", with the music composition cited as Naushad's "crowning glory" of the 1940s. Two other films of 1946 were Mohan Sinha's 1857 opposite Suraiya, and Panihari directed by V. M. Gunjal.

Elaan made in 1947, was a Mehboob Khan Productions, directed by Mehboob Khan. The film, a Muslim social, followed the fortunes of two step-brothers, one evil, called Sajjad, played by Himalayawala, the other good, called Javed, acted by Surendra, who is mistreated by Sajjad and his mother played by Zebunissa. Both brothers are in love with the same girl, Munawwar Sultana. Claimed to be a "stylised Muslim social", it had music by Naushad. Elaan was in trouble with the censors and banned for a time. When the censors cleared the film for viewing it was "rejected" by audiences and did not fare well at the box office though Surendra's acting was acclaimed as the "simple-hearted" stepbrother. Suendra went on to act in a couple of films directed by Mohan Sinha, Mere Bhagwan and Chittor Vijay, which turned out to unsuccessful commercially. A third film made by Sinha in 1949 Imtihan also flopped. According to Surendra, in an interview with Krishna, he stated the films were "very badly made and released without any build-up" and "very poor in content". The films faring poorly brought his acting career in a lead role to a near halt.

In 1948, Mehboob Khan cast Surendra in Anokhi Ada, with Naseem Banu and Prem Adib. Anokhi Ada was unsuccessful in creating the same "magic" as Anmol Ghadi and has been cited as "at best a modest grosser" at the box office. His duet with Shamshad Begum "Kyun Unhen Dil Diya" was appreciated. Anokhi Ada was also the last film Mehboob and Surendra worked in together.

=== 1950s-1980s ===
In 1950, Surendra was part of an ensemble cast in Hindustan Hamara, a fictional story that used "extensive documentary footage". Produced by the Documentary Unit of India, it was directed by Paul Zils. The film also featured Prithviraj Kapoor, Dev Anand, Durga Khote and P. Jairaj.

1n 1952, while going through a rough patch as far as film roles were concerned, he was offered to enact Tansen in Vijay Bhatt's film Baiju Bawra. The film starring Meena Kumari and Bharat Bhushan in the lead roles, went on to become a big success commercially, with its music composed by Naushad becoming popular. One of the highlights of the film was the music-singing competition between the court musician Tansen and the folk popular Baiju. However, instead of singing for himself in the film, Surendra had to lip-sync to Ustad Amir Khan for the song "Ghanana Ghanana Kar Barso Re" in raga Malhar, while the song sequence between Tansen and Baiju played by Bharat Bhushan had Ustad Amir Khan and D. V. Paluskar providing playback singing for them.

In 1954, Surendra's version of the song from Gawaiya "Teri Yaad Ka Deepak Jalta Hai Din Raat" was claimed to be a "super-hit". The roles were less, and Surendra switched to playing character roles. Some of his films in the period from late 1950s to 1970s included Rani Roopmati (1957), Mughal-E-Azam (1960) where he again played Tansen, Hariyali Aur Raasta (1962), Geet Gaaya Pattharone (1964), Waqt (1965), Boond Jo Ban Gayee Moti, Milan (1967) and Saraswatichandra (1968).

Surendra started making ad films and Television commercials for "big brands" like Colgate and Liril several years before his death.

== Personal life and family ==
Surendra was married to Satya Rishi, in Lahore on 3 March 1945. Satya Rishi was the sister of author Tilak Rishi. Surendra and Satya had four children, two daughters and two sons, Sunita, Jeetendranath, Kailash and Rohini. Surendra had started an ad film company, Surendra Film Productions making commercials. The name was changed to J K Advertisers and then FAR Productions, later run by his sons Jeetendra and Kailash. His son Jeetendra Surendranath and daughter Rohini Pinto manage the Indian Advertising Company FAR Commercials. His younger son Kailash Surendranath is an advertisement film-maker and founder of Kailash Picture Company. He is married to actress Aarti Gupta.

Surendra died on 11 September 1987 at the age of 76 years, in Mumbai, Maharashtra, India.

== Filmography ==
List of films:

Year	Film	Director	Composer	Studio
1936	Deccan Queen	Mehboob Khan	Pransukh Nayak, Ashok Ghosh	Sagar Movietone
1936	Aansuon Ki Duniya	A. P. Kapoor	Ustad Zandekhan	Amrit Films
1936	Manmohan	Mehboob Khan	Ashok Ghosh	Sagar Movietone
1936	Grama Kanya	Sarvottam Badami	Shankarrao Khatu	Sagar Movietone
1937	Qazzak Ki Ladki	K. Sardar	Ishrat Sultana	Rainbow Films
1937	Jagirdar	Mehboob Khan	Anil Biswas	Sagar Movietone
1937	Kal Ki Baat	Rama S. Choudhary	Mir Sahib	Saroj Movies
1937	Mahageet a.k.a. Eternal Music	Hiren Bose	Anil Biswas	Sagar Movietone
1938	Dynamite	C. M. Luhar	Anil Biswas	Sagar Movietone
1938	Gramophone Singer	V. C. Desai, Ramchandra Thakur	Anil Biswas	Sagar Movietone
1939	Jeevan Saathi a.k.a. Comrades	Nandlal Jaswantlal	Anil Biswas	Sagar Movietone
1939	Ladies Only	Sarvottam Badami	Anupam Ghatak	Sagar Movietone
1939	Service Ltd. a.k.a. Seva Samaj	C. M. Luhar	Anupam Ghatak	Sagar Movietone
1940	Aurat	Mehboob Khan	Anil Biswas	National Studios
1940	Alibaba	Mehboob Khan	Anil Biswas	Sagar Movietone
1942	Garib	Ramchandra Thakur	Ashok Ghose	National Studios
1942	Jawani	Wajahat Mirza	Anil Biswas	National Studios
1943	Paigham	Gyan Dutt	Gyan Dutt	Amar Pictures
1943	Vish Kanya	Kidar Sharma	Khemchand Prakash	Ranjit Studios
1943	Vishwas	Homi Wadia	Feroz Nizami, Chhelalal	Wadia Movietone
1944	Lal Haveli	K. B. Lall	Mir Sahib	Bombay Cinetone
1944	Miss Devi	C. M. Trivedi	Ashok Ghosh	Laxmi Productions
1944	Bhatruhari	Chaturbhuj Doshi	Khemchand Prakash	Navin Pictures
1945	Ratnavali	Surendra Desai	Gobindram	Amar Pictures
1945	Parinde	P. K. Atre	Gobindram	Atre Pictures
1945	Aarti	Ramchandra Thakur	Ashok Ghosh, Ali Bux	Screen Attractions Corp.
1945	Chand Chakori	Kidar Sharma	Bulo C. Rani	Ranjit Studios
1946	Anmol Ghadi	Mehboob Khan	Naushad	Mehboob Productions
1946	1857	Mohan Sinha	Sajjad Hussain	Murari Pictures
1946	Panihari	V. M. Gunjal	Ali Hussain, S. N. Tripathi	Asiatic Pictures
1947	Elaan	Mehboob Khan	Naushad	Mehboob Productions
1947	Manjhdhar	Sohrab Modi	Ghulam Haider, Gyan Dutt	Minerva Movietone
1947	Mere Bhagwan	Mohan Sinha	Sajjad Hussain	Murari Pictures
1948	Anokhi Ada	Mehboob Khan	Naushad	Mehboob Productions
1948	Dukhiyari	D. K. Ratan	Gyan Dutt	Jeevan Jyot Kalamandir
1949	Imtihaan	Mohan Sinha	S. Pathak	Veena Pictures
1949	Kamal	Surya Kumar	S. D. Burman	Hind Kamal Pictures
1950	Hindustan Hamara	Paul Zils	Vasant Desai	Documentary Unit of India
1951	Maya Machhindra	Aspi	Premnath (composer)	Super Pictures
1952	Baiju Bawra	Vijay Bhatt	Naushad	Prakash Pictures
1953	Gharbaar	Dinkar Patil	Vasant Prabhu	K. Pictures
1954	Gawaiya	H. P. Sharma	Ram Ganguly	R. B. Productions
1954	Mahatma Kabir	Gajanan Jagirdar	Anil Biswas	N. P. Films
1959	Dil Deke Dekho	Nasir Hussain	Usha Khanna	Filmalaya
1962	Hariyali Aur Rasta	Vijay Bhatt	Shankar Jaikishan	Prakash Pictures
1964	Geet Gaya Patharon Ne	V. Shantaram	Ramlal	V. Shantaram Productions
1965	Johar-Mehmood in Goa	I. S. Johar	Kalyanji Anandji	Johar Films
1965	Waqt	Yash Chopra	Ravi	B. R. Films
1967	Evening In Paris	Shakti Samanta	Shankar Jaikishan	Shakti Films
1967	Sangdil	Dharam Kumar	G. S. Kohli	Alamdeep Productions
1967	Milan	Adurthi Subba Rao	Laxmikant–Pyarelal	Rajashree Pictures, Prasad Productions
1968	Boond Jo Ban Gayee Moti	V. Shantaram	Satish Bhatia	Rajkamal Kalamandir (Shantaram Productions)
1968	Saraswatichandra	Govind Saraiyya	Kalyanji-Anandji	Sarvodaya Pictures
1973	Daag	Yash Chopra	Laxmikant–Pyarelal	Yash Raj Films, Trimurti Films
1974	36 Ghante	Raj Tilak	Sapan-Jagmohan	Raj Tilak
1974	Bazaar Band Karo	B. R. Ishara	Bappi Lahiri	B. R. Ishara
1975	Angaarey	Govind Saraiya	Chitragupta	Apollo Arts
1976	Kabeela	Bholu Khosla	Kalyanji Anandji	Bholu Khosla
1976	Fauji	Joginder Shelly	Sonik Omi	Ai Apollo
1977	Abhi To Jee Lein	Roshan Taneja	Sapan-Jagmohan	Embee Combines
