= Dillagi =

Dillagi (lit. 'fondness') may refer to:

- Dillagi (1942 film), 1942 Indian Hindi-language romance film by Balwant Bhatt, starring Sushil Kumar and Hansa Wadkar
- Dillagi (1949 film), Indian romantic-drama film by Abdur Rashid Kardar, starring Shyam and Suraiya
- Dillagi (1966 film), Indian romance film by S. N. Banerjee, starring Mala Sinha and Sanjay Khan
- Dillagi (1974 film), Pakistani Urdu-language romantic-drama film by Aslam Dar, starring Shabnam and Nadeem
- Dillagi (1978 film), Indian romance film by Basu Chatterjee, starring Dharmendra and Hema Malini
- Dillagi (1999 film), Indian romance film by Sunny Deol, starring Deol, Bobby Deol and Urmila Matondkar
- "Dillagi", a song by Jaidev Kumar and Ranjit Bawa from the 2018 Indian film Khido Khundi

== See also ==
- Dil Lagi, a 2016 Pakistani TV series
