= Mughal-e-Azam (soundtrack) =

1960 soundtrack album by Naushad

Soundtrack album by Naushad
- Released: 1960
- Genres: Hindi film music; Film soundtrack
- Length: 49:02
- Label: EMI Records
- Producer: Naushad

Naushad chronology
Kohinoor (1960)	Mughal-e-Azam (1960)	Ganga Jamuna (1961)

Mughal-e-Azam is the soundtrack album for the 1960 film of the same name directed by K. Asif. The soundtrack was composed by music director Naushad, and the lyrics were written by Shakeel Badayuni.

== Background ==
As with most of Naushad's soundtracks, the songs of Mughal-e-Azam were heavily inspired by Indian classical music and folk music, particularly ragas such as Darbari, Durga, used in the composition of "Pyar Kiya To Darna Kya", and Kedar, used in "Bekas Pe Karam Keejeye". He also made extensive use of symphony orchestras and choruses to add grandeur to the music. The soundtrack contained a total of 12 songs, which were rendered by playback singers and classical music artists. These songs account for nearly one third of the film's running time.

== Production ==
A total of 20 songs were composed for the film, at an average cost of ₹3,000 (valued at about US$629 in 1960) (Note: The exchange rate in 1960 was 4.77 Indian rupees (₹) per 1 US dollar (US$).) per song, though many were left out of the final cut owing to the film's length. Both Asif and Naushad approached Hindustani classical vocalist Bade Ghulam Ali Khan inviting him to participate in the film's soundtrack, but he refused, explaining that he disliked working in films. Asif, adamant about the presence of Khan, asked him to name his fee. Khan quoted a fee of ₹25,000 per song, at a time when Mohammed Rafi and Lata Mangeshkar (the best paid playback singers of the time) charged ₹300–400 per song, thinking that Asif would send him away. Instead, Asif agreed, and even gave Khan a 50 per cent advance. Surprised and left with no excuse to turn down the offer, he finally accepted. Khan sang two songs, "Prem Jogan Ban Ke" and "Shubh Din Aayo"; both were included in the final version of the film and demonstrated the artist's vocal virtuosity.

== Composition ==
The composition of "Pyar Kiya To Darna Kya" was especially time-consuming – on the day of the song's scheduled recording, Naushad rejected two sets of lyrics by Badayuni. Subsequently, a "brainstorming session" was held on Naushad's terrace, beginning in early evening and lasting until next day. Late in the night, Naushad remembered a folk song from eastern Uttar Pradesh with the lyrics "Prem kiya, kya chori kari hai..." ("I have loved, does it mean that I have stolen?"). The song was converted into a ghazal and subsequently recorded. At that time, since there was no technology to provide for the reverberation of sound heard in the song, Naushad had Mangeshkar sing the song in a studio bathroom. Some sources state that a chorus of a hundred singers supported singer Mohammed Rafi for the song "Ae Mohabbat Zindabad", though other sources place the number at a thousand. The song "Mohe Panghat Pe" was objected to by veteran director Vijay Bhatt. Although he was not directly involved with the project, he thought that it would "ruin the film", since it showed the Mughal emperor celebrating the Hindu festival Janmashtami. Though Naushad argued that the presence of Jodhabai made the situation logical, he met with the film's screenwriters and subsequently added dialogue that explained the sequence.

== Track listing ==
All lyrics are written by Shakeel Badayuni; all music is composed by Naushad.

No.	Title	Singer(s)	Length
1.	"Mohe Panghat Pe (Raga Pilu)"	Lata Mangeshkar	4:02
2.	"Pyar Kiya To Darna Kya (Raga Durga)"	Lata Mangeshkar	6:21
3.	"Mohabbat Ki Jhooti (Raga Darbari Kanada)"	Lata Mangeshkar	2:40
4.	"Humen Kash Tumse Mohabbat"	Lata Mangeshkar	3:08
5.	"Bekas Pe Karam Keejeye (Raga Kedar)"	Lata Mangeshkar	3:52
6.	"Teri Mehfil Mein"	Lata Mangeshkar, Shamshad Begum	5:05
7.	"Ye Dil Ki Lagi"	Lata Mangeshkar	3:50
8.	"Ae Ishq Yeh Sab Duniyawale"	Lata Mangeshkar	4:17
9.	"Khuda Nigehbaan"	Lata Mangeshkar	2:52
10.	"Ae Mohabbat Zindabad"	Mohammed Rafi	5:03
11.	"Prem Jogan Ban Ke (Raga Sohani)"	Bade Ghulam Ali Khan	5:03
12.	"Shubh Din Aayo Raj Dulara"	Bade Ghulam Ali Khan	2:49
Total length:			49:02

== Reception ==
The soundtrack of Mughal-e-Azam received universal acclaim from critics in India. It is often cited as one of the best soundtracks in Hindi film history, and was one of the best-selling Hindi film albums of the 1960s. Shahid Khan, writing for Planet Bollywood, gave the soundtrack ten out of ten stars and called the music the "soul of the film". In 2004, Subhash K. Jha reviewed the re-mastered release of the soundtrack, praising the technical quality of the re-release and the original vocals of Lata Mangeshkar. In 2013, Baldev S Chauhan of Sun Post called the songs "some of the greatest songs of Hindi cinema."

== Colourised version ==
When the film was colourised for re-release, the soundtrack was also reworked, with original composer Naushad receiving help from Uttam Singh. The score remained the same, but the sound was touched up and converted to Dolby Digital. The orchestral part was re-recorded with live musicians, but the original solo vocals were retained. The cost was reported to be between ₹2.6 million ($57,375) and ₹6.5 million ($143,437).

== Bibliography ==
- Morcom, Anna (2007). Hindi Film Songs and the Cinema. Ashgate Publishing, Ltd. ISBN 978-0-7546-5198-7.
- Gokulsing, K. Moti; Dissanayake, Wimal (17 April 2013). Routledge Handbook of Indian Cinemas. Routledge. ISBN 978-0-415-67774-5.
