= Shahenshah Babar =

1944 film

- Directed by: Wajahat Mirza
- Music by: Khemchand Prakash
- Release date: 1944
- Country: India
- Language: Hindi

Shahenshah Babar is a 1944 Indian Hindi-language film directed by Wajahat Mirza.

It is based on the life of the Mughal emperor Babur.

== Cast ==
- Sheikh Mukhtar
- Anwari (Anwari Begum)
- Khurshid
- Agha
