= Manmohan (film) =

- Directed by: Mehboob Khan
- Written by: Zia Sarhadi
- Produced by: Sagar Movietone
- Starring: Surendra; Bibbo; Yakub; Kayam Ali
- Cinematography: Faredoon Irani
- Music by: Ashok Ghosh; Anil Biswas
- Production company: Sagar Movietone
- Release date: 1936
- Running time: 147 min
- Country: India
- Language: Hindi

Manmohan is a 1936 Indian Urdu/Hindi-language romantic tragedy film directed by Mehboob Khan. This was Khan's third film for Sagar Movietone after Al Hilal (1935) and Deccan Queen (1936). The cinematographer was Faredoon Irani who, starting from Mehboob Khan's Al Hilal (Judjement of Allah) (1935), went on to establish a long working relationship with him lasting till Khan's last film Son of India (1962). The music was composed by Ashok Ghosh assisted by Anil Biswas. The story writer was Zia Sarhadi who also wrote the lyrics, screenplay and dialogue in addition to acting in the film. Though he had started his writing career on Khan's backing for Deccan Queen (1936), it was with Manmohan that he achieved success. The film was inspired by Devdas, (1935), which was a big hit at the box office. Surendra was chosen as the singing star to rival K. L. Saigal from New Theatres Calcutta, whose songs from Devdas had mesmerised the nation. Though Manmohan was referred to as the "poor man's Devdas" the film went on to do well and the songs became very popular. The film starred Bibbo, Surendra, Yakub, Kayam Ali, Bhudo Advani and Mehdi Raza.

The film which revolves around two childhood friends, Vimala (Bibbo), and Ashok (Surendra), who loves her but loses her to another, finally taking to drink.

== Plot ==
Ashok (Surendra) is an artist in love with Vimala (Bibbo). On learning that she is to marry Jagdish (Yakub) he is devastated and paints her portraits which become popular. He starts drinking and finds comfort with another woman. Soon his family wealth starts dwindling. Vimala, who is married by now, tries to help him with her husband's efforts. However, Ashok misunderstands the overture, leading to tragedy for him.

== Cast ==
- Bibbo as Vimala
- Surendra as Ashok
- Yakub as Jagdish
- Ashalata as Shanti
- Ramchandra Pal
- Bhudo Advani
- Pande
- Pesi Patel
- Kayam Ali
- Mehdi Raza
- Zia Sarhadi

== Music ==
The music composition was by Ashok Ghosh, with assistance from a then "young arranger", Anil Biswas. The lyrics were written by a then "small-time" actor Zia Sarhadi. The film's soundtrack became its "highlight" with "chart-busting" music. Surendra was brought in as a singer actor to counter New Theatres K. L. Saigal. The duet by Surendra and Bibbo "Tumhi Ne Mujhko Prem Sikhaya" is considered a hit song and remains popular. The songs from this film made Surendra a popular singing star.

=== Songs ===
#	Title	Singer
1	"Khizaan Ne Aake Chaman Ko Ujaad Dena Hai"	Bibbo, Surendra
2	"Chali Re Berniya Main So Gayi"	
3	"Dukh Ke Dinan Mein Koi Nahin"	Ramchandra Pal
4	"Saawan Ban Aao Aaj Paayo Na Sandeswa"	Surendra
5	"Nanhe Se Man Mein More Yaad Tihari"	Ramchandra Pal
6	"Prem Hi Man Ka Meet Sakhi Ri"	Bibbo
7	"Shokh Bhari Aankhon Se Meri Prem Ki Ganga Behne Do"	Surendra
8	"Tumhi Ne Mujhko Prem Sikhaya"	Bibbo, Surendra
9	"Aao Sunaoon Main Tumko Prem Kahani"	Surendra, Ramchandra Pal
10	"Jo Guzri Hai Ham Par Agar Ham Bata De"	Ramchandra Pal
