= Motorwali =

- Starring: Radha
- Release date: 1942
- Country: India
- Language: Hindi

Motorwali is a Bollywood film. It was released in 1942.
