= Madhusudan (film) =

- Directed by: Balwant Bhatt
- Starring: Badri Prasad
- Release date: 1941
- Country: India
- Language: Hindi

Madhusudan is a Bollywood film. It was released in 1941. It was directed by Balwant Bhatt and starred Badri Prasad.

== Cast ==
- Kumar
- Maya Bannerji
- Badri Prasad
- Jeevan
- Gulab
- Ashalata Biswas
