= 1857 (film) =

- Film poster
- Directed by: Mohan Sinha
- Written by: M. Zahur
- Screenplay by: Dr. Safdar'ah'
- Story by: M. Zahur
- Starring: Surendra; Suraiya; Wasti; Madan Puri
- Cinematography: V. N. Reddy
- Edited by: Manhar Prabhu
- Music by: Sajjad Hussain
- Release date: 4 January 1946
- Country: India
- Language: Hindi

1857 is a 1946 Indian Bollywood film. It was the fifth highest grossing Indian film of 1946. The film was directed by Mohan Sinha for Murari Pictures. The story was by M. Zahur with screenplay and dialogue by Safdar 'Ah'. The film starred the singer-actor pair of Surendra and Suraiya, along with Wasti, Nigar, Munshi Khanjar, Madan Puri.

1857 was a historical fiction drama set against the backdrop of the Indian Rebellion of 1857 also known as the First war of independence.

== Cast ==
Male

- Surendra as Aslam
- Wasti as Navab Aghashouqat
- Benjamin as Jawahir Singh
- Shakir as Nawab Khurshid Mirza
- Shyam Sunder as Manzoor
- Ganju as Bahadur Shah
- Y. N. Joshi as Dileep
- Madanpuri as Prince Mirza Mughal
- Munshikhanjar as father of Manzoor

Female

- Suraiya as Tasnim
- Menka as Begum
- Nigar as mother of Manzoor
- Lila as sister of Manzoor
- Laxmi as Queen of Jhanshi

Dances

- Kundanlal

== Soundtrack ==
The music composer was Sajjad Hussain and the lyricists were Anuum Pilibhiti, Pandit Ankur, Shewan Rizvi, and Y.N.Joshi. The singers were Suraiya, Surendra, Shamshad Begum, Khan Mastana and Rajkumari.

=== Song list ===
#	Title	Singer	Lyricist
1	"Meri Ho Gayi Unse Baat"	Suraiya	Pandit Ankur
2	"Dilli Tere Kile Par"	Suraiya	Shewan Rizvi
3	"Umido Ka Tara Kismat Pe"	Suraiya	Anjum Pilibhiti
4	"Gham-e-Aashiyana Satayega Kab Tak"	Suraiya	Mohan Singh
5	"Teri Nazar Mein Main Rahun"	Surendra, Suraiya	Mohan Singh
6	"Jhamak Jhamak Liye"	Shamshad Begum	Y. N. Joshi
7	"Chupke Hi Chupke Na Jaana"	Rajkumari, Khan Mastana	Anjum Pilibhiti
8	"Woh Pehli Mulaqat"	Surendra	Pandit Ankur
