= Badi Bahu =

- Directed by: Shamim Bhagat
- Written by: Ramanand Sagar
- Produced by: Ashalata Biswas
- Starring: Shekhar; Nimmi; Smriti Biswas
- Music by: Anil Biswas
- Release date: 1951
- Country: India
- Language: Hindi

Badi Bahu is a 1951 Indian Hindi-language film directed by Shamim Bhagat and produced by Ashalata Biswas. The film features a soundtrack composed by Anil Biswas. The cast includes Shekhar, Nimmi, Smriti Biswas, Yashodhra Katju, Ishu Jagirdar, Shivraj, and Rajen Kapoor.

The film was reviewed by The Times of India on 20 October 1951. Its story, written by Ramanand Sagar in the initial stage of his career, won him Mussoorie Film Festival Award for Best Story.
