= Sukhi Jeevan =

- Directed by: Master Bhagwan; Harishchandra
- Release date: 1942
- Country: India
- Language: Hindi

Sukhi Jeevan is a Bollywood film released in 1942.

== Cast ==
- Bhagwan
- Ashalata Biswas
- Harishchandra
- Nazira
- Bibijan
- W. M. Khan
- Shyam Kumar
- Samson
