= Kiski Biwi =

- Starring: Mohammad Afzal; E. Bilimoria
- Release date: 1942
- Country: India
- Language: Hindi

Kiski Biwi is a Bollywood film. It was released in 1942.
