= Lalaji =

- Directed by: Chamankant Gandhi; Lalit Mehta
- Starring: Yashodhra Katju; Yakub; Krishnakant; Amar
- Music by: Vasant Kumar Naidu
- Production company: National Studios
- Release date: 1942
- Country: India
- Language: Hindi

Lalaji is a Hindi Language film. It was released in 1942. The film starred Yashodhra Katju, Yakub, Amar, Sunalini Devi, Krishnakant and Maya Devi. It was directed by Chamankant Gandhi and Lalit Mehta for National Studios with music composed by Vasant Kumar Naidu.
