= Jawani (film) =

- Directed by: Wajahat Mirza
- Starring: Husn Banu
- Release date: 1942
- Country: India
- Language: Hindi

Jawani is a Bollywood film released in 1942.
