= Anokhi Ada (1948 film) =

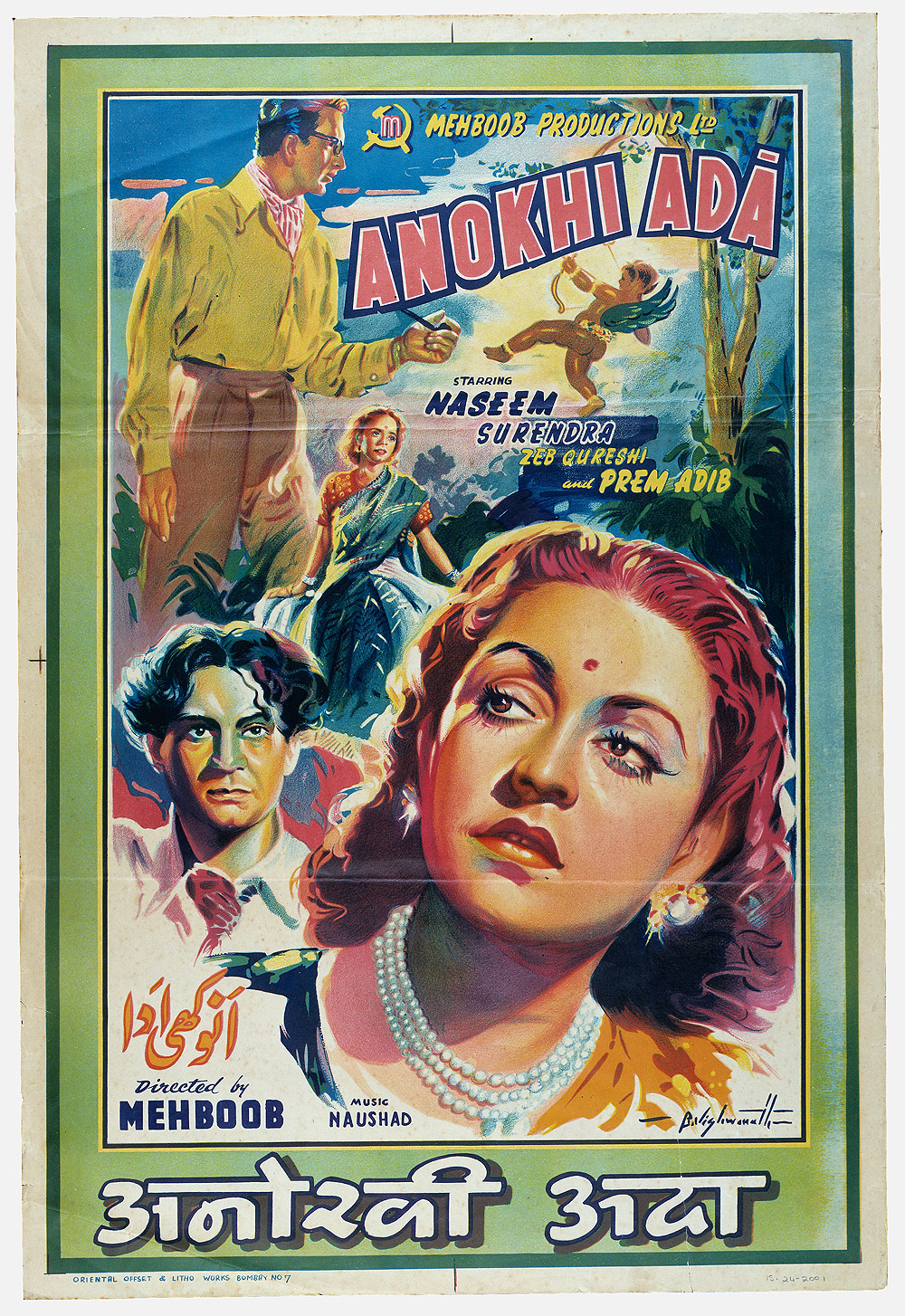
- Directed by: Mehboob Khan
- Screenplay by: Agha Jani Kashmiri
- Story by: Zia Sarhadi
- Starring: Surendra; Naseem Banu; Prem Adib
- Cinematography: Faredoon Irani
- Edited by: Shamsuddin Qadri
- Music by: Naushad
- Release date: 1948
- Country: India
- Language: Hindi

Anokhi Ada (Hindi: अनोखी अदा, Unique Style) is a 1948 romantic Hindi film directed by Mehboob Khan. The story was by Zia Sarhadi, with screenplay and dialogue by Agha Jani Kashmiri. The music composer was Naushad, assisted by Ghulam Mohammed and the lyricists were Shakeel Badayuni and Anjum Pilibhiti. The director of photography was Faredoon Irani. It was produced under the Mehboob Productions banner and starred Naseem Banu, Surendra, Prem Adib, Zeb Qureshi, Reehan, Pratima Devi and Cuckoo.

The story was a romantic triangle involving Surendra and Prem Adib as the two men in love with Naseem Banu, who played the role of a woman suffering from amnesia.

== Plot ==
Prakash and his older sister (Naseem Banu) live a poor life, and are unable to pay their rent. Laat saheb (Prem Adib) is from a rich family, but having left home, lives as a poor homeless man. He tries to help the brother and sister get something to eat. He ventures out during curfew hours and is caught by the police, but is able to hand the food to the brother and sister. The sister develops a soft spot for Laat Saheb. However, the neighbours insist that she be put out of her house as she is having an affair with Latt saheb. When Prakash dies due to an accident, his sister thinks of moving from their rented accommodation. Travelling by train, she again meets up with Laat saheb, who is going to see his unwell mother. During the journey he lets her know that he loves her, much to her joy. The train they are in meets with an accident and she is presumed dead. She ends up in a hospital where she meets Professor Nath (Surendra), who takes her home as she has lost her memory. He renames her Kamini and blocks any means of her regaining her memory since he's fallen in love with her, and does not want to lose her. Laat saheb re-enters her life and tries to help her remember her past. Finally, she regains her memory and goes off with Laat saheb, leaving the Professor behind.

== Cast ==
- Naseem as Kamini
- Surendra as Professor Nath
- Prem Adib as Laatsaheb
- Zeb Qureshi as Mirch
- Reehan
- Pratima Devi (Hindi Actress) as Laatsaheb's mother
- Murad as Laatsaheb's father
- Cuckoo as Stage Dancer
- Bhudo Advani
- Amir Banoo
- Wasker
- Abdul
- Haroon
- Nawab
- Master Ghulam Mohamed

== Music ==
The music direction was by Naushad and the two lyricists were Shakeel Badayuni and Anjum Pilibhiti. The songs were sung by Surendra, Mukesh, Shamshad Begum and Uma Devi (Tun Tun). The film had memorable numbers which became popular, like "Kyun Unhe Dil Diya", sung by Surendra and Shamshad Begum. Mukesh was pitted against Surendra, who had a big success with Anmol Ghadi (1946). However, Mukesh, giving playback to Prem Adib, sang some appealing songs like the ghazal "Kabhi Dil Se Dil Takrata Toh Hoga".

=== Song list ===
Title	Singer	Lyricist
"Jale Na Kyun Parwana"	Surendra	Anjum Pilibhiti
"Bade Bhole Bhale Hai Dil Lene Wale"	Surendra	Anjum Pilibhiti
"Kyun Unhe Dil Diya"	Surendra, Shamshad Begum	Shakeel Badayuni
"Kahe Jiya Dole Ho Kaha Nahi Jaye"	Uma Devi (Tun Tun)	Shakeel Badayuni
"Dil Ko Laga Kar Humne Kuchh Bhi Na Paaya"	Uma Devi (Tun Tun)	Shakeel Badayuni
"Aaj Kaha Jaa Ke Nazar"	Shamshad Begum	Shakeel Badayuni
"Nazar Mil Gayi Jane Kiski Nazar Se"	Shamshad Begum	Shakeel Badayuni
"Bhool Gaye Kyo De Ke Sahara"	Shamshad Begum, Mukesh	Shakeel Badayuni
"Ye Pyaar Ki Baaten Ye Safar Bhul Na Jaanaa"	Mukesh	Shakeel Badayuni
"Bhulane Vaale Yaad Na Aa"	Mukesh	Shakeel Badayuni
"Kabhi Dil Dil Se"	Mukesh	Shakeel Badayuni
"Manzil Ki Dhun Me Jhumate Gaate Chale Chalo"	Mukesh	Shakeel Badayuni
