= Huma Gun Anmogaldi =

- Directed by: Mehboob Khan
- Release date: 1942
- Country: India
- Language: Hindi

Huma Gun Anmogaldi is a Bollywood film directed by Mehboob Khan. It was released in 1942.
