= Chudiyan =

- Directed by: L.J. Bhatt; K.J. Parmar
- Starring: Gulab
- Music by: S. N. Tripathi
- Release date: 1942
- Country: India
- Language: Hindi

Chudiyan is a Bollywood film. It was released in 1942.
