= Haso Haso Ai Duniyawallaon =

- Directed by: Dwarka Khosla
- Release date: 1942
- Country: India
- Language: Hindi

Haso Haso Ai Duniyawallaon is a Bollywood film. It was released in 1942.
