= Swaminath =

- Directed by: Wajahat Mirza
- Starring: Keki Adajania
- Release date: 1942
- Country: India
- Language: Hindi

Swaminath is a Bollywood film. It was released in 1942.
