= Mamta (1942 film) =

- Release date: 1942
- Country: India
- Language: Hindi

Mamta is a Bollywood film. It was released in 1942.
