= Paromita Vohra =

Indian filmmaker and writer

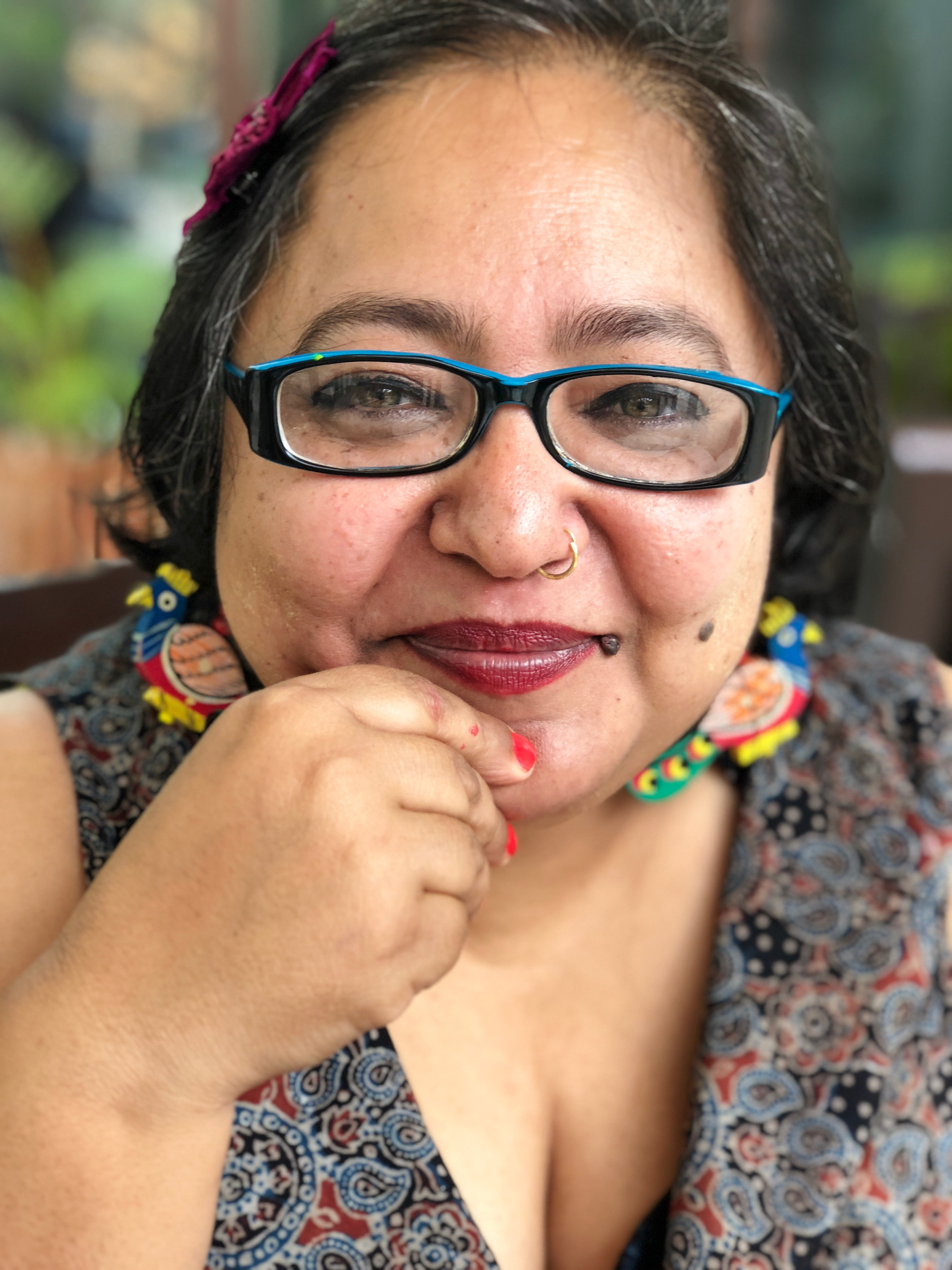
- Occupations: Filmmaker and writer
- Known for: Making documentaries
- Notable work: Khamosh Pani, Unlimited Girls, Q2P
- Relatives: Anil Biswas (grandfather); Parul Ghosh (great-aunt)

Paromita Vohra is an Indian filmmaker and writer. She is known for her documentaries on subjects such as urban life, desire, pop culture and gender. She has also written the screenplay of the award-winning feature film Khamosh Pani. Her film production company Parodevi Pictures is based in Mumbai. She writes a column Paro-normal Activity for the Sunday Mid-day and also wrote a weekly column for Mumbai Mirror.

== Biography ==
Vohra lives in Mumbai. She is the daughter of Shikha Vohra, who in turn was the daughter of the music composer Anil Biswas by his first wife Ashalata Biswas, an actress who worked in Hindi cinema during the 1930s and 1940. Vohra studied mass communication in Miranda House at the University of Delhi (1986 – 1989).

Vohra co-founded Agents of Ishq, an online platform for positively representing sex in India through various media forms. She is also its current creative director. Agents of Ishq has multimedia content in English and Hindi and helps readers access comprehensive sexuality education, focusing on the three aspects of sex education, sexual experience and sexual etiquette. Vohra has indicated that the platform should talk about "desire, freedom, gender, equality, and choice". and a place where young Indians can access the right information about sex.

== Filmography ==
List of films directed by Paromita Vohra (Note: Paromita Vohra filmography-director: "Goddess of Food - Magic Lanterns Movies". Magic Lantern Movies.; "A Woman's Place - Magic Lanterns Movies". Magic Lantern Movies.; "A Short Film About Time - BFI". British Film Institute.; "Unlimited Girls - Magic Lanterns Movies". Magic Lantern Movies.; "Work in Progress - Magic Lanterns Movies". Magic Lantern Movies.; "Cosmopolis - Magic Lanterns Movies". Magic Lantern Movies.; "Where's Sandra? - Magic Lanterns Movies". Magic Lantern Movies.; "Q2P - Magic Lanterns Movies". Magic Lantern Movies.; "Morality TV and the Loving Jehad - PSBT". Public Service Broadcasting Trust.; "Partners in Crime - Magic Lanterns Movies". Magic Lantern Movies.)
Year	Title	Language(s)	Director	Producer	Screenplay	Other
1995	Annapurna: Goddess of Food	English	Yes	Yes		
1999	A Woman's Place	English	Yes			
2000	A Short Film about Time	English	Yes	Yes	Yes	
2002	Unlimited Girls	English	Yes			Actor
2004	Work In Progress	English	Yes			
2004	Cosmopolis: Two Tales of a City	English	Yes			
2005	Where's Sandra?	English	Yes			
2006	Q2P	English	Yes			
2008	Morality TV and the Loving Jehad - Ek Manohar Kahani	Hindi, English	Yes			
2012	Partners in Crime	English	Yes			
2013	Connected Hum Tum, Season 1	Hindi, English				Series Director

List of films contributed to by Paromita Vohra (Note: Paromita Vohra filmography-contributor: "Skin Deep". Majlis.; A few things I know about her (DVD Video, 2002). WorldCat. OCLC 773789002.; "Khaamosh Pani:Silent Waters". IMDb.; "IIHS Library Catalog - If you Pause - Details for in a Museum of Craft". Indian Institute for Human Settlements.; The House on Gulmohar Avenue (DVD Video, 2005). WorldCat. OCLC 85785293.)
Year	Title	Language(s)	Producer	Screenplay	Dialogues	Other
1998	Skin Deep	Multilingual			Yes	
2002	A Few Things I Know About Her	English, Hindi, Rajasthani			Yes	
2003	Khamosh Pani/Silent Waters	Punjabi		Yes		
2004	If You Pause - in a Museum of Craft	English, Hindi, Rajasthani			Yes	
2005	The House on Gulmohar avenue	English, Hindi				Script Consultant
