= Char Aankhen =

- Release date: 1944
- Country: India
- Language: Hindi

Char Aankhen is a Bollywood film. It was released in 1944.

== Cast ==
- Leela Chitnis
- Paidi Jairaj
- P. F. Peethawala
- Ashalata Biswas
- Paul Mahendra
- Nand Kishore
