= Imtihaan (1949 film) =

Film by Mohan Sinha

- Directed by: Mohan Sinha
- Starring: Madhubala; Surendra
- Music by: Shyambabu Pathak Indeevar (lyrics)
- Release date: 1949
- Country: India
- Language: Hindi

Imtihaan (transl. "Test") is a 1949 Bollywood Hindi romantic drama film directed by Mohan Sinha and starring Madhubala and Surendra in lead roles.

== Cast ==
- Madhubala as Roopa
- Surendra
- Sajjan
- Gulaab
- Madan Puri
- Cuckoo Moray

== Soundtrack ==
The soundtrack was composed by Shyambabu Pathak and lyrics were written by Indeevar and Harikrishna. Surendra, leading man of the film, had also sung a song named "Har Nafrat Ki Mohabbat Ne" for the film.

#	Song	Singer
1	"Man Ka Albela Pancchi"	Mohantara Talpade
2	"Zindagi Bhati Nahi"	Geeta Dutt
3	"Aate Hain Mere Ghar"	Geeta Dutt
4	"Dekho Dil De Ke"	Geeta Dutt
5	"Deke Jana Nishani Tumhari"	Geeta Dutt
6	"Har Nafrat Ki Mohabbat Ne"	Surendra
7	"Koi Humko Na Chodo"	Geeta Dutt
8	"Koi Jaake Unhe Samjhana"	Surendra
9	"Maine Godi Mein Chanda Paya Re"	Mohantara Talpade
10	"Piya Hamko Nahi Pehchan Paye"	Mohantara Talpade

== Reception ==
Madhubala's biographer Mohan Deep called Imtihaan "a shabby film".

The film was successful commercially and was among the films that helped Madhubala establish herself as a leading lady. Her close friend and retired IAS officer Latif told, "After Mahal (her breakthrough film), Madhubala did eight films in 1949; all hits in some measure or the other. However Dulari, Singaar and Imtihaan stand out."
