= Nari (film) =

- Directed by: Raja Yagnik
- Starring: Trilok Kapoor; Lalita Pawar
- Release date: 1942
- Country: India
- Language: Hindi

Nari is a Bollywood film. It was released in 1942 starring Trilok Kapoor and Lalita Pawar. The music director was Harishchandra Bali.
