= Jawan Ki Pukar =

- Release date: 1942
- Country: India
- Language: Hindi

Jawan Ki Pukar is a Bollywood film. It was released in 1942.
