= Dukh Sukh =

- Produced by: Ahsan Khan
- Release date: 1942
- Country: India
- Language: Hindi

Dukh Sukh is a Bollywood film. It was released in 1942.
