= Duniya Tumhari Hai =

- Directed by: G.P. Pawar
- Music by: S. N. Tripathi
- Release date: 1942
- Country: India
- Language: Hindi

Duniya Tumhari Hai is a Bollywood film. It was released in 1942.
