= Bhakta Kabir =

- Directed by: Rameshwar Sharma
- Starring: Bharat Bhushan
- Release date: 1942
- Country: India
- Language: Hindi

Bhakta Kabir is a Bollywood film. It was released in 1942.
