= Chauranghee =

- Directed by: Sibtain Fazli; Nabendusundar
- Starring: Prithviraj Kapoor; Ruby Mayer; Ashalata Wabgaonkar
- Release date: 1942
- Country: India
- Language: Hindi

Chauranghee is a Bollywood film. It was released in 1942.
