= Jivan Palto =

- Directed by: Hiralal Doctor, Amritlal Thakar
- Written by: Hiralal Doctor, Jayantilal Sanghvi (story), Hiralal Doctor,(screenplay)
- Produced by: Jayantilal Sanghvi
- Starring: Nirupa Roy; Hasmukhkumar; Kalpana Kumari; Kesharbai
- Music by: Avinash Vyas
- Production company: Vanguard Pictures
- Release date: 1948
- Country: India
- Language: Gujarati

Jivan Palto is 1948 Indian Gujarati social drama film directed by Hiralal Doctor and Amritlal Thakar.

== Plot ==
The plot is based on Gandhian principles and the upliftment of the fallen.

== Cast ==
The principal cast is as follows:

- Nirupa Roy
- Hasmukhkumar
- Kalpana Kumari
- Kesharbai

Supporting cast include:

- Kokila
- Baburaje
- Amubai
- Saudamini
- Shanti Madhok
- Pandey
- Niranjan
- Shyam Sundar
- Suryakant
- Natwarlal Chauhan
- Gangaram
- Dinesh Padia
- Leela Jayvant
- Kamla
- Madhu Pathak

== Soundtrack ==
"Garbo Ghumto Re Aavyo, Azadi Ne Aangan" is a garba song celebrating the joy of independence of India. Raghunath Brahmbhatt's song "Rasjyoti Hati Tara Naynama, Mara Nayanona Aavi Samai Gai," originally written for a play but included in the film, became popular. "Mara Khiliya Re Suman Keri Pankhadi, Aaj Sasariye Jay Mari Rankadi" is a song of a bride's farewell. The marching song "Ay Hind Teri Shaan Ka Chamka Hai Sitara" describes the life of Mahatma Gandhi.

Jivan Palto

Soundtrack album by Avinash Vyas
- Released: 1948
- Genre: Feature film soundtrack
- Language: Gujarati

All lyrics are written by Avinash Vyas, Raghunath Brahmbhatt, Pandit Swarup Vyas, Pandit Balam; all music is composed by Avinash Vyas

Track listing
No.	Title	Length
1.	"Garbo Ghumto Re Aavyo, Azadi Ne Aangan"
2.	"Rasjyoti Hati Tara Naynama, Mara Nayanona Aavi Samai Gai"
3.	"Ay Hind Teri Shaan Ka Chamka Hai Sitara"
