= Deccan Queen (film) =

1936 film

- Directed by: Mehboob Khan
- Written by: Zia Sarhadi
- Produced by: Sagar Movietone
- Starring: Surendra; Aruna Devi; Ramchandra Pal; Kayam Ali
- Cinematography: Faredoon Irani
- Music by: Pransukh Nayak
- Production company: Sagar Movietone
- Release date: 1936
- Running time: 158 min
- Country: India
- Language: Hindustani

Deccan Queen is a 1936 Hindustani action-adventure film directed by Mehboob Khan.

It was the first "stunt" film from Sagar Movietone and the first film for actor Surendra, who was credited as "Surendra Nath B.A., L.L.B.". The film helped launch him as a singing star.

This was the only action film directed by Mehboob Khan as he later shifted to films with social and political messages. This was Mehboob Khan's second directorial venture after Al Hilal (1935).

He asked Zia Sarhadi, then an unknown small-time actor, to write the screenplay, dialogue and songs for Deccan Queen.

== Plot ==
The film revolves around Aruna Devi in a double-role, one as the dreaded Deccan Queen out for revenge against treacherous men, and the other as a sober typist in love with the police inspector (Surendra) who is planning to nab Deccan Queen. The famous train Deccan Queen was used for the heroine to show her swiftness in eluding the police.

When Lala Niranjanmal dies, his two children, daughter Aruna (Aruna Devi) and son are cheated out of their inheritance by the fraudulent trustees. They incriminate Aruna in a crime for which she has to go to jail while her brother drifts away penniless and out of his mind. On release from jail, Aruna has vengeance on her mind and becomes the fearful Deccan Queen. The police are quickly after her and police Inspector Suresh (Surendra) is assigned to apprehend her. Vrinda (Aruna Devi) works for an insurance company and meets Suresh. They both fall in love. It is soon realised that Vrinda and Deccan Queen resemble each other. Deccan Queen takes advantage of this. After several action scenes and the kidnapping of Vrinda by Aruna, things are sorted out when Suresh helps the Deccan Queen reveal the dishonest Trustees.

== Cast ==
- Surendra as Inspector Suresh
- Aruna Devi as Aruna a.k.a. Deccan Queen and as the twin sister Vrinda
- Ramchandra Pal
- Pande
- Pesi Patel
- M. A. Mani
- Kayam Ali
- Bhudo Advani
- Mehdi Raza
- Gulzar

== Soundtrack ==
The film's music was composed by Pransukh Naik and its lyricist was Zia Sarhadi. The singers were Surendra, Aruna Devi and Ramchandra Pal. The song "Birha Ki Aag Lagi More Man Mein", sung by Surendra, started him on his way to stardom as a singing star and to be called the "(K. L.) Saigal of Bombay".

Song list:

| # | Title | Singer |
|---|---|---|
| 1 | Yaad Na Kar Dil-e-Hazin Bhooli Hui Kahaaniyaan | Surendra |
| 2 | "Birha Ki Aag Lagi More Man Mein" | Surendra |
| 3 | "Bana Kyun Pagal Yeh Sansar" | Ramchandra Pal |
| 4 | Dil Ki Lagi Ko Hum Nahin Kaise Koi Bujha Sake | Surendra |
| 5 | "Kaale Baadal Fizaaon Mein Chhaane Lage" | Ramchandra Pal |
| 6 | "Ae Kartaar Paalanhaar" | Surendra, Aruna Devi |
| 7 | "Chal Ae Dil Kahin Jaa Kar Aansoo Bahaayein" | Ramchandra Pal |
| 8 | "Man Nagri Ujadi Thi Baalam Tumne Use Basaya" | |
| 9 | "Sawan Ke Sundar Phoolon Ka" | Surendra, Aruna Devi |
| 10 | Yeh Na Thi Hamari Kismet, Ke Visaal-e-Yaar Hota | A popular ghazal song by poet Mirza Ghalib |
