= Bahana (1942 film) =

1942 film

- Directed by: A.M. Khan
- Starring: Alaknanda
- Release date: 1942
- Country: India
- Language: Hindi

Bahana is a Bollywood film. It was released in 1942.
