= Barat (film) =

1942 film

- Directed by: Gunjal
- Starring: Rampyari
- Release date: 1942
- Country: India
- Language: Hindi

Barat is a Bollywood film. It was released in 1942.
