= The YP Foundation =

The YP Foundation is a support organisation and a non-profit organisation for young people in India. It was established in July 2002 by social entrepreneur Ishita Chaudhry with support from the India Habitat Centre, New Delhi. In 2007, The organisation was legally incorporated 'The YP Foundation'- a charitable trust. The YP Foundation is a youth development organisation that facilitates young people’s feminist and rights-based leadership on issues of health equity, gender justice, sexuality rights, and social justice. It ensures that young people have the information, capacity, and opportunities to inform and lead the development and implementation of programmes and policies that impact their lives and are recognised as skilled and aware leaders of social change.

The organisation funds and supports innovative work by young people, by providing young people between the ages of 13 and 30 years with a resource base to image and execute their own projects and initiatives working with socio-cultural, economic, legal, and environmental issues they are passionate about. It has supported work in multiple fields through varied mediums such as community initiatives, the performing and visual arts, literary and research projects, interactive workshops, policy and government interaction and research and advocacy work amongst others.

Guiding Principles

- The YP Foundation does not discriminate on the grounds of sex, religion, caste, ability, age, class, gender identity, sexual orientation, employment, socio-economic status, or HIV status
- The YP Foundation believes that every person’s human rights should be respected, affirmed, and fulfilled.
- The YP Foundation uses a feminist and intersectional lens to guide our work that considers how individual identity may overlap into multiple disadvantaged groups.
- The YP Foundation strives to affirm agency and ensure inclusion
- The YP Foundation demands all voices should be heard and everyone’s right to choose should be actively and substantially affirmed

The YP Foundation has supported ventures in the following fields:

- Education and development for young people in rural and urban India
- Issues and platforms for the performing arts, mainly film, photography, music and theatre.
- Substance abuse & the adolescent (India/South Asia focus)
- Gender and sexuality
- Disaster relief and rehabilitation (tsunami relief work/Kashmir earthquake relief work)
- Community initiatives for underprivileged families in New Delhi.
- The youth voter and India’s political system
- Media, its ethics and social responsibility
- Prevention and awareness/understanding the reality of HIV/AIDS
- Peer pressure and its medical/social consequences for urban young people
- Sexual reproductive health and rights awareness and advocacy
- The young citizen’s right to information and the legal system of India.

== Awards and honours ==
In 2006, The YP Foundation was given the SMILE fellowship by NGO Pravah and was selected as a final affiliate for the Change Looms Award given by The Ashoka Foundation and Pravah. In November 2007 Founder and Managing Trustee Ishita Chaudhry was awarded the Karmaveer Puraskaar - the National Award for Social Justice and Action by ICONGO and the Nand and Jeet Khemka Foundation. In 2008, The YP Foundation has been awarded the Seen and Heard 2008 Award - an International UK-based award given by British Telecom and The UK Youth Parliament to recognise exceptional initiatives that have created platforms for young people. Founder Ishita Chaudhry was also nominated for the MtvIndia Youth Icon in 2008.
