= Sheikh Chilli (film) =

1942 film

Sheikh Chilli, also titled Ghanchakkar, is an Indian film released in 1942. Directed by Kikubhai Desai, the film features a dancer-actress and choreographer who is not credited in its accompanying song booklet.
