= Mohe Panghat Pe Nandlal Chhed Gayo Re =

1960 original film soundtrack

Song by Naushad, Shakeel Badayuni and Lata Mangeshkar
- Language: Hindi
- Released: August 5, 1960
- Recorded: 1960
- Genre: Bollywood film song
- Length: 4:02
- Composer: Naushad
- Lyricists: Raghunath Brahmbhatt; Shakeel Badayuni

Music video
- "Mohe Panghat Pe Nandlal Chhed Gayo Re" on YouTube

"Mohe Panghat Pe Nandlal Chhed Gayo Re" (transl. Krishna teased me at the river bank) is a classical Hindi film song featured in the 1960 epic movie Mughal-e-Azam, directed by K. Asif. The song is composed by Naushad, and sung by Lata Mangeshkar with a chorus. Initially the lyrics were credited to Shakeel Badayuni but the song was later credited to its original lyricist Raghunath Brahmbhatt.

== Composition and context ==
"Mohe Panghat Pe..." is the first song to appear in the film.

The song is picturised on Madhubala, who plays the role of beautiful courtesan Anarkali in the film and portrayed Radha in the song. It was objected to by director Vijay Bhatt. Although he was not directly involved with the project, he thought that it would "ruin the film", since it showed the Mughal emperor Akbar celebrating the Hindu festival Janmashtami. Though Naushad argued that the presence of Jodha Bai made the situation logical, he met the screenwriters and subsequently added dialogue that explained the sequence.

It was shot in technicolour and choreographed by Kathak maestro Lachhu Maharaj. It was composed by the musician Naushad and was inspired by the song "Kahe Gumaan Kare Re Gori". It is structured on a classical thumri style. The composition is regarded as a demonstration of Naushad's expertise in integrating Indian classical traditions into film music.

== Authorship dispute ==
The song's authorship has been controversial. The original film credits Shakeel Badayuni as the lyricist, however, the re-released colour version on 12 October 2004, forty years after the film's release, credits Raghunath Brahmbhatt as the lyricist.

The song was originally penned by Brahmbhatt for the Gujarati play, Chhatra Vijay, in 1920. It was performed live by master Mukund during the performance. It was also recorded by The Twins, a gramophone company. When the film was released in 1960, a viewer informed the Pakistani daily Dawn that the song has been copied. Brahmbhatt approached director K. Asif for copyright infringement and later filed a complaint with the Film Writers' Association and received a compensation of Rs 11,000 as royalty. However, in 2004, Brahmbhatt's grandson, Raj Brahmbhatt signed an agreement with the film's producer, Shapoorji-Palonji's Sterling Investment Corporation Limited, which acknowledged and credited Raghunath Brahmbhatt as a lyricist on the covers of the home video released by the company.

== Reception ==
The song received widespread acclaim as one of the standout pieces of the original film soundtrack.
