= Dillagi (1942 film) =

- Directed by: Balwant Bhatt
- Release date: 1942
- Country: India
- Language: Hindi

Dillagi is a Bollywood film. It was released in 1942.
