= Bisvi Sadi =

1945 Indian Hindi-language film

- Directed by: Mohan Bhavnani
- Starring: Nargis; Motilal
- Music by: Pannalal Ghosh
- Production company: Bhavnani Productions
- Release date: 1945
- Country: India
- Language: Hindi

Bisvi Sadi is a 1945 Indian Hindi-language film directed by Mohan Bhavnani, and produced under the banner of his Bhavnani Productions. The film stars Nargis, Motilal, Mazhar Khan and Ashalata Biswas. Music director Pannalal Ghosh composed the soundtrack.

== Plot ==
Narayan (Motilal), the son of the wealthy Sir Shankerlal (Mazhar Khan), aspires to become a stage producer and build a theater in his town. His ambition clashes with his father, who strongly opposes the theater and holds different plans for his son's future. Following a heated argument, Narayan leaves home to pursue his passion independently.

With the assistance of supportive friends and Laxmi (Ashalata Biswas), a wealthy woman who harbors feelings for him, Narayan launches his theatrical venture. During auditions, Veena (Nargis), an impoverished woman seeking employment, demonstrates exceptional talent in singing and dancing. She is hired, and as they collaborate on stage productions, romance blossoms, eventually leading to their marriage.

The couple's happiness is interrupted when Sir Shankerlal, unaware that Veena is pregnant, emotionally manipulates her into believing that her presence will ruin Narayan's life. Convinced to make a sacrifice, Veena secretly leaves her husband. Enduring severe hardship on her own, she eventually finds shelter with a sympathetic villager, where she gives birth to her child.

In the city, a heartbroken Narayan falls gravely ill. Eventually, Narayan and Veena cross paths once again. Realizing his mistakes, Sir Shankerlal forgives the couple, bringing about a full reconciliation and restoring happiness to the family.

== Cast ==
- Nargis as Veena
- Motilal as Narayan
- Mazhar Khan as Sir Shankerlal
- Ashalata Biswas as Laxmi
- Gope
- Mazumdar as the munshi

== Release and reception ==
The film was released in Bombay on 1 December 1945. It was reportedly popular with audiences.

Baburao Patel of filmindia criticised the film's story, direction, and music, while noting Nargis as a standout performer. He concluded that the film provides "complete boredom from beginning to end" and is "too poor a picture to waste a ticket on".
