= Mata (1942 film) =

- Directed by: Gunjal
- Release date: 1942
- Country: India
- Language: Hindi

Mata is a Bollywood film. It was released in 1942.
