= Sachcha Sapna =

- Release date: 1942
- Country: India
- Language: Hindi

Sachcha Sapna is a Bollywood film. It was released in 1942.

== Cast ==
- Rajkumari
- Madhav Kale
- Kumar
- Ashalata
