= My Village =

- Written by: Gagan sharma
- Release date: 1942
- Country: India
- Language: English

My Village is a 1942 Bollywood film.
