= Wajahat Mirza =

Indian screenwriter and film director

- Born: 20 April 1908; Sitapur, United Provinces of Agra and Oudh, British India
- Died: 4 August 1990 (aged 82); Karachi, Sindh, Pakistan
- Occupations: Dialogue writer, screenwriter, story writer, film director
- Years active: 1933 – 1980
- Awards: Filmfare Best Dialogue Award (1960); Filmfare Best Dialogue Award (1961)

Wajahat Hussain Mirza Changezi (Hindi: वजाहत मिर्ज़ा; 20 April 1908 – 4 August 1990) was an Indian screenwriter and film director who penned the dialogues of some of the most successful films in India during the 1950s and 1960s, best known for Mughal-e-Azam (1960) and the Academy Award nominee, Mother India (1957).

== Awards ==
Mirza won Filmfare Best Dialogue Award twice, in 1960 for Mughal-e-Azam, and in 1961 for Ganga Jamuna.

He also won the Bengal Film Journalists' Association Awards for Ganga Jamuna.

== Early life and career ==
He was born in Islampur, a small town 89 kilometers from Lucknow. While studying at Government Jubilee Inter College, Lucknow, Mirza became acquainted with cinematographer Krishan Gopal of Calcutta, and worked as his assistant. He later co-produced with singer Midgan Kumar a movie called Anokhi Mohabbat ("Crazy Love") in Bombay. He also directed the 1945 hit film Prabhu Ka Ghar starring Khursheed Bano, Trilok Kapoor and Sulochana Chatterjee. Mirza later became a dialogue and screenplay writer and was also one of the first Indians to be nominated for an Oscar for the movie Mother India (1957), based upon a story by Babubhai Mehta. He later moved to Pakistan and spent his final years there before his death.

== Filmography ==
=== As director ===
- 1942 - Swaminath
- 1942 - Jawani
- 1944 - Shahenshah Babar
- 1945 - Prabhu Ka Ghar
- 1950 - Nishana

=== As writer ===
- 1933 - Yahudi Ki Ladki (dialogue writer)
- 1934 - Anokhi Mohabbat (dialogue & screenplay)
- 1938 - Hum Tum Aur Woh (dialogue writer, lyrics)
- 1938 - Teen Sau Din Ke Baad (dialogue writer)
- 1938 - Watan (dialogue & screenplay)
- 1939 - Ek Hi Raasta (dialogue writer)
- 1940 - Aurat (dialogue writer)
- 1941 - Bahen (dialogue & screenplay)
- 1942 - Roti (dialogue writer)
- 1944 - Lal Haveli (dialogue writer)
- 1944 - Shahenshah Babar (director/dialogue writer)
- 1945 - Prabhu Ka Ghar (director/dialogue writer)
- 1945 - Zeenat (dialogue & story)
- 1948 - Shaheed (dialogue writer)
- 1949 - Chilman (dialogue & screenplay)
- 1953 - Shikast (dialogue & story)
- 1956 - Aawaz (dialogue writer)
- 1957 - Mother India (dialogue writer)
- 1958 - Yahudi (dialogue writer)
- 1960 - Kohinoor (dialogue writer)
- 1960 - Mughal-E-Azam (dialogue writer)
- 1961 - Gunga Jumna (Ganga Jamna) (dialogue writer)
- 1964 - Leader (dialogue writer)
- 1967 - Palki (dialogue writer)
- 1969 - Chanda Aur Bijli (dialogue writer)
- 1969 - Shatranj (dialogue writer)
- 1970 - Umang (dialogue writer)
- 1972 - Yeh Gulistan Hamara (dialogue & screenplay)
- 1973 - Heera (dialogue & screenplay)
- 1974 - Dukh Sukh (dialogue writer)
- 1978 - Daaku Aur Jawan (dialogue writer)
- 1978 - Ganga Ki Saugandh (dialogue writer)
- 1986 - Love And God (dialogue writer)
