= Mehboob Khan =

Film director (1907-1964)

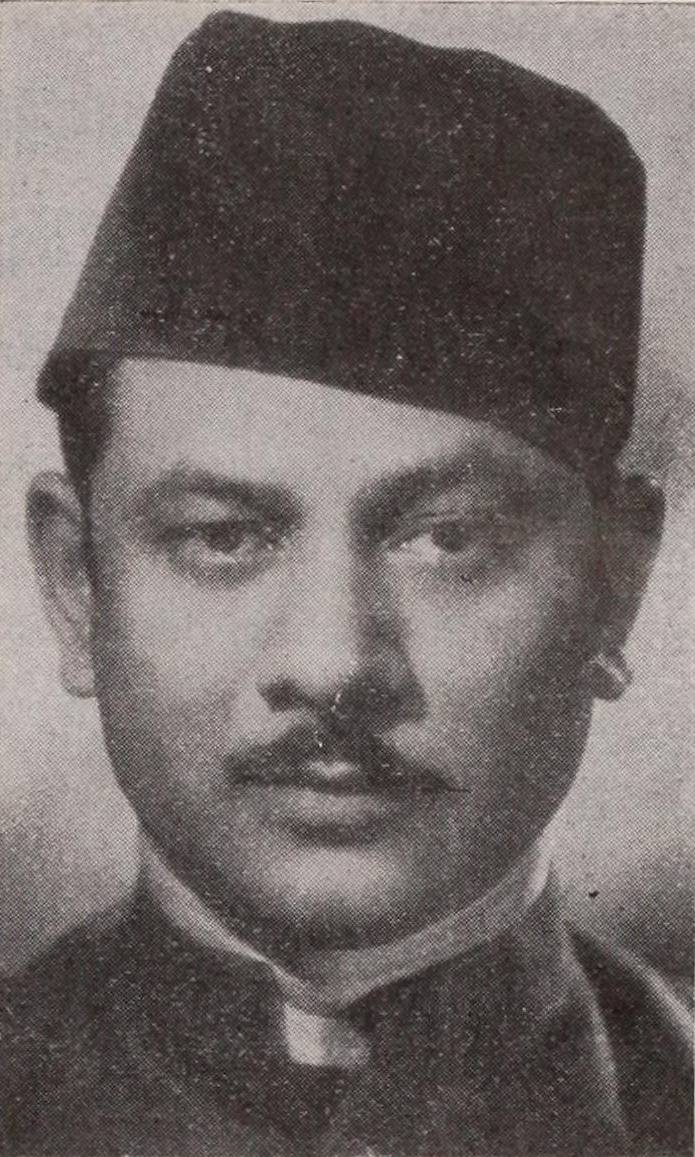
- Mehboob Khan in the early 1940s
- Born: Ramzan Khan; 9 September 1907; Bilimora, Baroda State, British India
- Died: 28 May 1964 (aged 56); Bombay, Maharashtra, India
- Resting place: Badakabarastan, Marine Lines, Mumbai
- Occupations: Film director, producer
- Years active: 1931–1962
- Spouse(s): Fatima (separated); Sardar Akhtar
- Children: 4; One adopted
- Honors: Padma Shri (1963) award by the Government of India; *Filmfare Award for 'Best Director' for 'Mother India (1957 film)' *Postage stamp to honor him by India Post on 30 March 2007

Mehboob Khan Ramzan Khan (9 September 1907 – 28 May 1964) was a prominent Indian film director and producer. He is best known for directing the social epic Mother India (1957), which won the Filmfare Awards for Best Film and Best Director, two National Film Awards, and was a nominee for the Academy Award for Best Foreign Language Film.

He set up his production company – Mehboob Productions, and later a film studio – Mehboob Studios in Bandra, Mumbai in 1954.

He also created the dacoit film genre with Aurat (1940) and Mother India, and is also known for other blockbusters including the romantic drama Andaz (1949), the swashbuckling musical Aan (1951), and the melodrama Amar (1954).

== Early life ==
Khan was born Ramzan Khan in Bilimora in Gandevi Taluka of Navsari district (now Gujarat) on 9 September 1907.

== Career ==
He was brought to Bombay from his home town in Gujarat by Noor Muhammad Ali Muhammed Shipra Baddhiyawala (producer and horse supplier in Indian cinema) to work as a horseshoe repairer in a stable (owned by Noor Muhammad Ali Muhammed Shipra Baddhiyawala). One day at the shooting of South Indian director Chandrashekhar, Mehboob showed interest in working with Chandrashekhar. After seeing his great interest and skills, Chandrashekhar asked Noor Muhammad Ali Muhammed Shipra Baddhiyawala to allow him to take Mehboob with him to work at small jobs in the film studios of Bombay.

At first, Mehboob Khan made several attempts to appear as a hero in films but lost out to bigger names of the time like Master Vithal for the first Indian talkie Alam Ara (1931 film). He started as an assistant director in the Silent Film era and as an extra in the studios of the Imperial Film Company of Ardeshir Irani, before directing his first film Al Hilal a.k.a. Judgement of Allah (1935), when he started directing films for the Sagar Film Company. His close friend, cinematographer Faredoon Irani, helped convince the film producer to give him his first chance to direct a film. Notable films he directed for Sagar Movietone and National Studios included Deccan Queen (1936), Ek Hi Raasta (1939), Alibaba (1940), Aurat (1940) and Bahen (1941).

In 1945, Khan set up his own production house – Mehboob Productions. In 1946, he directed the musical hit Anmol Ghadi, which featured singing stars Surendra, Noor Jehan and Suraiya in leading roles. Khan went on to produce and direct many blockbuster films, the most notable being the romantic drama Andaz (1949), the swashbuckling musical Aan (1951), the melodrama Amar (1954), and the social epic Mother India (1957). The latter was a remake of his 1940 film Aurat and was nominated for an Academy Award in 1957. His earlier works were in Urdu, but his later material, including Mother India, were in Hindustani, a friendlier and softer spoken version of Hindi and Urdu. Several of his films, especially his earlier work on Humayun (1945), the story of a Mogul emperor who ruled India, Anmol Ghadi (1946), and Taqdeer (in which he introduced Nargis, who later married Sunil Dutt), were written by Aghajani Kashmeri. Kashmeri was responsible for picking and training Nargis in Hindustani and Urdu dialogue delivery. His last film as a director was 1962's Son of India.

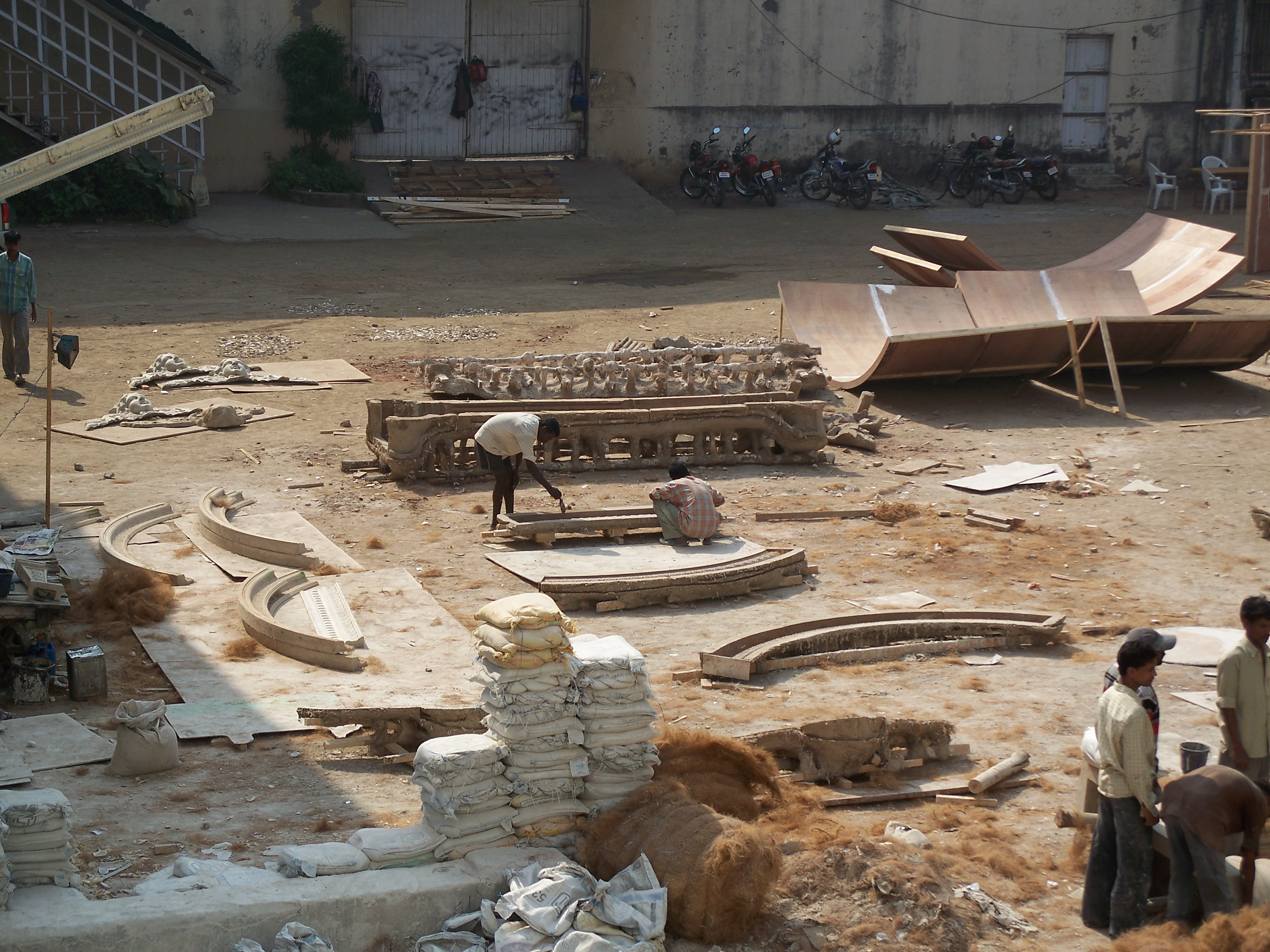
Mehboob Studios courtyard set up by Khan in 1954, Bandra (W), Mumbai

He died of a heart attack in 1964 at the age of 56 and was buried at Badakabarastan in Marine Lines, Mumbai. His death occurred the day after the death of Jawaharlal Nehru, the Prime Minister of India.

== Industry influence and talent discoveries ==
Khan introduced and helped establish the careers of many actors and actresses who went on to become big stars in the 1940s, 1950s and 1960s such as Surendra, Arun Kumar Ahuja, Dilip Kumar, Raj Kapoor, Sunil Dutt, Rajendra Kumar, Raaj Kumar, Nargis, Nimmi and Nadira. In 1961, he was a member of the jury at the 2nd Moscow International Film Festival. He remained the president of the Film Federation of India from 1963 through 1964.

Mehboob Khan was known for having been influenced by Hollywood, and his films often featured lavish sets in the style of the Hollywood at that time. The oppression of the poor, class warfare and rural life are recurring themes in his work.

Mehboob Khan was awarded the title of Hidayat Kar-e-Azam by the Indian government.

== Personal life ==
Mehboob Khan married twice. With his first wife Fatima, he had three sons: Ayub, Iqbal and Shaukat. After separation from his first wife, he married the famous Indian film actress Sardar Akhtar (1915–1986) in 1942. He adopted Sajid Khan (born 28 December 1951), who has starred in Indian and foreign English films.

== Death and legacy ==
Mehboob Khan died of a heart attack on 28 May 1964. As a part of his birth centenary celebrations, the Indian postal department released a commemorative stamp of Mehboob Khan at a function held at the Mehboob Studios in September 2007.

== Filmography ==
=== As a director ===
- Son of India (1962)
- A Handful of Grain (1959)
- Mother India (1957)
- Amar (1954)
- Aan (1952)
- Andaz (1949)
- Anokhi Ada (1948)
- Elaan (1947)
- Anmol Ghadi (1946)
- Humayun (1945)
- Najma (1943)
- Taqdeer (1943)
- Roti (1942)
- Huma Gun Anmogaldi (1942)
- Bahen (1941)
- Alibaba (1940)
- Aurat (1940)
- Ek Hi Raasta (1939)
- Hum Tum Aur Woh (1938)
- Watan (1938)
- Jagirdar (1937)
- Deccan Queen (1936)
- Manmohan (1936)
- Al Hilal a.k.a. Judgement of Allah (1935)(debut film of Mehboob Khan as a director)

=== As a producer ===
- Mother India (1957)
- Paisa Hi Paisa (1956)
- Aawaz (1956)
- Amar (1954)
- Aan (1952)
- Anokhi Ada (1948)
- Elaan (1947)
- Anmol Ghadi (1946)
- Zarina (1932)

=== As an actor ===
- Alibaba and the Forty Thieves (1927)
- Allah Ka Pyar (1927)
- Shirin Khushrau (1929)
- Mewad No Mawalik (1930)
- Raj Tilak (1931)
- Dilawar (1931)
- Meri Jaan (1931)
- Veer Abhimanyu (1931)
- Bulbul-e-Baghdad (1932)
- Chandrahasa (1933)
- Pandav Kaurav (1933)
- Mirza Sahiban (1933)
- Premi Pagal (1933)
- Grihalakshmi (1934)
- Naachwali (1934)
- Sati Anjani (1934)
- Vengeance Is Mine (1935)

=== As a writer ===
- Watan (1938) (story)
- Al Hilal a.k.a. Judgement of Allah (1935) (story, screenplay)

== Awards and honours ==
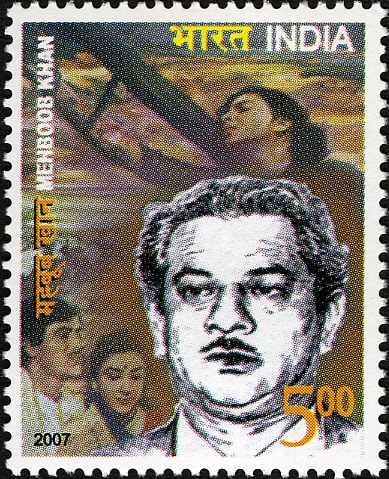
Stamp issued by Government of India in his centenary year released on 30 March 2007

Academy Awards

- 1958 – Best Foreign Language Film – Mother India (nomination)

National Film Awards

- 1958 – All India Certificate of Merit for Best Feature Film – Mother India
- 1958 – Certificate of Merit for Second Best Feature Film in Hindi – Mother India

Filmfare Awards

- 1958 – Best Film – Mother India
- 1958 – Best Director – Mother India
- 1963 – Best Director – Son of India (nomination)

Honours

- 1963: Awarded Padma Shri, the fourth highest civilian honour by Government of India.
- 30 March 2007, India Post released a commemorative stamp showing Maheboob Khan and a scene of 'Mother India' depicting Raaj Kumar & Nargis
