= Zia Sarhadi =

Indian and Pakistani screenwriter and director (1914–1997)

Zia Sarhadi (Urdu: ضیا سرحدی; born Fazl-e-Qadir Sethi 1914 in Peshawar, North West Frontier Province – 27 January 1997 in Karachi, Sindh) was an Indian and Pakistani screenwriter and director in the Indian film industry, whose career spanned what is widely considered the Golden Age of Indian Cinema.

== Career ==
Zia Sarhadi received his early education and a college degree from Peshawar. While he was a student, he was interested in poetry and writing short stories. He then moved to Bombay in 1933 to pursue a film career. He first worked for the East India Film Company and some other companies for a while. Then he met the noted film director Mehboob Khan in Bombay. At Mehbbob's suggestion, he started writing screenplays and film stories for him.

He was the father of TV and radio actor Khayyam Sarhadi and grandfather of actress Zhalay Sarhadi. As a film director, he was probably best known for his films Hum Log (1951), Baiju Bawra (1952) and Footpath (1953).

He was involved in writing the script as a consultant for the film Mother India (1957), considered one of the greatest Indian films of all time, but is rarely credited for his contribution. Described as an "unaffiliated Marxist", his films were known for dealing with social issues of the period. His film Footpath, for instance, dealt with issues of moral guilt in the 1950s India.

== Death and legacy ==
Zia Sarhadi died due to a heart attack in Madrid, Spain on 27 January 1997 at age 82. He was buried in his hometown Peshawar, Pakistan later.

== Filmography ==
Year	Title	Director	Screenwriter	Notes	Ref.
1936	Bhole Bhale	Yes			
1936	Deccan Queen		Yes		
1936	Manmohan		Yes	Actor and lyricist also	
1937	Jagirdar		Yes		
1937	Kokila			Lyricist	
1938	Madhur Milan	Yes			
1938	Abhilasha	Yes	Yes		
1938	Hum Tum Aur Woh			Lyricist	
1938	Teen Sau Din Ke Baad			Lyricist	
1938	Gramophone Singer		Yes		
1939	Seva Samaj		Yes		
1939	Ladies Only		Yes	Lyricist also	
1939	Jeevan Sathi		Yes		
1940	Sajani		Yes	Lyricist also	
1940	Ali Baba		Yes		
1941	Bahen		Yes		
1943	Nadaan	Yes			
1945	Yateem	Yes			
1947	Elaan		Yes		
1948	Anokha Pyar			Lyricist	
1948	Anokhi Ada		Yes		
1950	Khel		Yes		
1951	Hum Log	Yes			
1952	Baiju Bawra		Yes		
1953	Footpath	Yes	Yes		
1956	Awaaz	Yes			
1960	Rahguzar	Yes			
1964	Beti		Yes	dialogues only	
1966	Insaan	Yes			
1967	Lakhon Mein Aik		Yes		
1977	Naya Suraj		Yes		
