= Sagar Movietone =

Indian film production company (1929–1940)

- Type: Private
- Industry: Indian Film industry
- Founded: 1929
- Founder: Chimanlal Desai, Ambalal Patel, Ardeshir Irani
- Defunct: 1940
- Headquarters: Bombay, India
- Products: Films

Sagar Movietone, also known as Sagar Films, Sagar Film Company and Sagar Productions, was an Indian company involved in the production of films for Indian cinema. It was launched by Ardeshir Irani with Chimanlal Desai and Dr. Ambalal Patel in 1929 in Bombay, Maharashtra, India. Sagar was initially started as a branch company of Ardeshir's Imperial Film Company. Several key figures from Imperial, such as Mehboob Khan were shifted to Sagar. The studio was in operation from 1930 to 1939. In 1940, it combined with General Pictures to form National Studios. It made "Parsi theatre based films, mythologicals and stunt movies". Sagar fostered the career of many artists who rose to prominence. Early directors such as Prafulla Ghosh, Sarvottam Badami, Ezra Mir and Nanubhai Vakil were promoted by the company. Mehboob Khan got his first break as a director in Al Hilal in 1935. He was referred to as "the most important alumnus" from Sagar, who went on to become one of Indian cinema's "most influential film-makers".

With the launch of the studio, five silent films were produced in 1930. Their first silent film was Dav Pech (The Web) (1930). Their first talkie film was Meri Jaan, also called Romantic Prince (1931). That year Sagar made nine films. The company also produced films in Gujarati, Telugu, Tamil, Bengali and Punjabi. The first Tamil talkie was produced by Sagar Movietone; Kalidas (1931), directed by H. M. Reddy and starring T. P. Rajalakshmi. However, production reference for Kalidas has also been credited to Imperial Film Company, the parent company of Sagar. The first Gujarati Talkie Narsinh Mehta was produced by Sagar in 1932.

Films such as Manmohan (1936), Jagirdar (1937), Hum Tum Aur Woh (1938) and Ek Hi Raasta (1939) were stated to be a notable collaboration between Mehboob Khan as director and Anil Biswas as music composer. Both Mehboob Khan and Biswas worked at Sagar for a long period, with their collaboration extending to National Studios.

== History ==
The people involved in the formation of Sagar Movietone were: Ardeshir Irani who started the company as a subsidiary of Imperial Films in 1929; Chimanlal Bhogilal Desai and Dr. Ambalal Patel who joined and took over the company in 1930.

- Ardeshir Irani (1886-1969) earlier founded Star Films (1920) with Bhogilal Dave, then Majestic Films (1923), Royal Art Studios (1925) and Imperial Film Company in 1926. Under the banner of Imperial Films, Irani produced the first talkie film of India Alam Ara (1931) and the first colour film Kisan Kanya (1937). According to an interview Mehboob Khan gave to Filmfare on 16 August 1957, Irani wanted to contract actor Master Vithal, who had become popular doing Douglas Fairbanks' The Thief Of Baghdad (1924) style of swashbuckling roles and was known as "The Indian Fairbanks". Vithal at that time was working for Sharda Film Company and it was deemed unethical of a man of Irani's stature to lure Vithal to Imperial. Irani then started Sagar Film Company as a "subsidiary of Imperial Film Company", in 1929, with Mehboob Khan heading the production unit. The matter regarding Vithal was taken to court (1929) when Vithal was forcibly kept in Nanubhai Desai's house in Pune under the say of Bhogilal Dave, who now ran Sharda Film Company. Irani hired lawyer Muhammad Ali Jinnah, who advised Vithal to go for a bid. Sharda Film Company was unable to match Imperial's bid and lost Vithal to them. Chimanlal Desai and Dr. Ambalal Patel joined Irani as partners at Sagar in 1930. The Select Film Circuit was owed money by Irani, he instead offered Desai and Patel a partnership for an amount of Rs. 50,000. Once Desai and Patel joined, Irani left Sagar, leaving them as the sole proprietors.

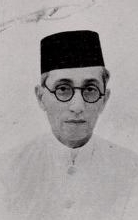
Chimanlal B. Desai (1938)

- Chimanlal Desai was representative and distributor for Imperial Film Company and Sharada Film Company in South India with his base in Bangalore. Prior to getting into the film distribution business, Desai had worked in coal supply, in printing and then in the textile business. It was while working as a cloth merchant with his brothers in Bangalore that Desai was approached to help with a film distribution concern, Select Film Circuit, owned by Vasantray Desai and managed by Vasantray's younger brother Thakorbhai Desai. Chimanlal Desai decided to invest in the company, inviting his friend Dr. Ambalal Patel to join in with Rs. 5000. The two started distributing films through Select Film Circuit, which now belonged to them. They became the sole distributors for Imperial Films and Sharda Film Company based in Bombay for the South India market. In 1929, when the business hit a snag due to problems in sending films by the film companies, Desai decided to travel to Bombay himself to find a solution. There, he was invited by Ardeshir Irani, who owed money to Desai, to join as a partner in Sagar for a sum of Rs. 50,000. Later, in 1930, Desai and Patel became the sole proprietors, when Irani left to focus on Indian cinema's first talkie, Alam Ara, while Sagar concentrated on their first talkie film, Meri Jaan. Desai remained the active partner in the production department.
- Ambalal Patel was born in Sojitra, Kheda district, Bombay Presidency (now Gujarat). Leaving his job as a doctor, he joined the Velchand group, who were in bicycles sales. He then joined the Bombay Cycle & Motor Agency that sold cars manufactured by General Motors. After joining Desai as a partner in Select Pictures Circuit in 1925, the company expanded distributing films from Bombay. He joined Desai in Bombay, where they went into partnership in Sagar Movietone in 1930. He left Sagar in 1936, and returned to Bangalore. He was later to help form Sudama Pictures with Sarvottam Badami and Sabita Devi along with Ranjit Studios. Badami was to make three films for Sudama, Sajani (1940), Chingari (1940) and Bambai Ki Sair (1941) before he left Sudama Pictures.

== Production ==
=== Work ===
By the time Desai and Patel took over, nearly ten silent films were made starting with Dav Pech (The Web) (1930). Out of a total of 12 silent films, only two; Hoor-E-Misr and Dilawar were made following Desai and Ambalal joining Sagar. From the sixty-six films produced by Sagar, fifty-two were in Hindi, five in Tamil. three in Telugu, four in Gujarati and one in Punjabi. When Irani left Sagar in 1930 to concentrate on Alam Ara (1931), Sagar started work on its first talkie Meri Jaan (Romantic Prince) (1931), operating equipment used by Irani during the day for Alam Ara, while Sagar technicians used it during the night. Some of the notable films from Sagar were:

Veer Abhimanyu (1931), directed by Prafulla Ghosh and starring Jal Merchant, Zubeida, Yakub, Jilloobai, and Mehboob Khan. Narsinh Mehta (Gujarati) (1932), directed by Nanubhai Vakil became the first feature film in Gujarati. The cast included Master Manhar, Mohanlala, Marutirao and Mehtab. Chandrahasa (1933), directed by Sarvottam Badami, Farzande Hind (1934), Shaher Ka Jadoo which introduced Motilal.

Grihalaxmi (1934) was directed by Sarvottam Badami. A family melodrama about an educated wife going through humiliation at the hands of her husband, but continues to stay with him, it starred Sabita Devi, Jal Merchant and Yakub. Badami was known for directing "socially relevant" films for Sagar Movietone. It was a remake of Bhaneli Bhamini (1927), which carried a social message against sexually transmitted disease.

Al Hilal (1935) was the debut direction by Mehboob Khan and introduced Sitara Devi in the leading role opposite Kumar. Dr. Madhurika, a film, though successful at the box-office, got a mixed response from a select audience group, which were disappointed with the female protagonist submitting in the end.

=== Actors ===
Motilal was born in Simla. While in Bombay he visited a shooting schedule at Sagar Studios. He was spotted by director K. P. Ghosh and offered the lead in Shehar Ka Jadoo (1934). He had no formal training, which acted to his benefit, becoming known for his natural acting. He was to work in several top films produced by Sagar most of them opposite Sabita Devi, Silver King, Dr. Madhurika, Do Diwane, Jagirdar (1937), Kokila, Kulvadhu and Hum Tum Aur Woh. He left Sagar to join Ranjit Studios.

Sabita Devi was one of the top paid actresses at the time. She started her career in silent films, and with the arrival of talkies learned Hindi. She shifted from British Dominion Films Ltd., Calcutta, to Kinema Arts, and then worked for the Calcutta-based East India Film Company. She moved to Bombay and joined Sagar Film Company. She acted opposite Motilal in his debut film Shaher Ka Jadoo (1934). She was the star of Sagar Movietone and acted in several films produced by them. Her last film for them was Ladies Only (1939). She left Sagar and went into partnership with Dr. Ambalal Patel and Sarvottam Badami at Sudama Pictures.

Surendra came to Bombay on the insistence of film distributor Lala Alopi Prasad. Mehboob Khan gave him his debut role in Deccan Queen (1935) and Manmohan (1936). Manmohan was made as a Bombay response to the Calcutta-produced Devdas (1935). Surendra's acting and singing were appreciated by the audiences and he went on to act in several roles that show-cased his sensitive appeal. He moved to National with Mehboob Khan giving performances in successful films such as Aurat.

Bibbo acted in India's first sound film Alam Ara. She worked in thirteen films produced by Sagar. Her popular pairing with Surendra had them acting in several films together, most famous being Manmohan, Gramaphone Singer and Ladies Only. When Sagar shut down, she shifted to Circo Productions.

Yakub started his acting career as an extra in silent films in Sharda Film Company. He joined Sagar Film Company and was a regular in most films produced by them. He acted in their first talkie, Meri Jaan. He worked with Mehboob Khan in several films and formed a working and friendly relationship with him. He shifted to National Studios with Khan when Sagar shut down acting in Aurat (1940) cited as one of the finest performances in Indian cinema.

Other stars who worked with Sagar were Kumar, Maya Banerejee, Snehprabha Pradhan, Wahidan Bai, Kanhaiyalal and popular comedians such as Noor Mohammed Charlie, Bhudo Advani and V. H. Desai. Mukesh the playback singer, first acted in a Sagar production Nirdosh.

=== Directors ===
Mehboob Khan was shifted from Imperial to Sagar at its formation. He played supporting roles in several initial Sagar films. With the help of his friends cinematographer Faredoon Irani and Gangaram, a laboratory assistant, he developed a story narrating it to Ambalal Patel. The film was Al Hilal (Judgement Of Allah) and it marked the entry of Mehboob as a director. He was to direct several successes for Sagar such as Deccan Queen, Manmohan, Jagirdar, Watan, Hum Tum Aur Woh, Ek Hi Raasta (1939) and Ali Baba. He moved to National Studios on its formation and directed three big hits; Aurat, Bahen (1941) and Roti (1942). He went on to form his own production company Mehboob Productions in 1943 and remade Aurat in 1957 as Mother India (1957), which went on to become a classic.

Sarvottam Badami came to Bombay from Bangalore to learn automobile engineering. He was asked by Ardeshir Irani to help in the recording for Alam Ara. Though he only knew Kannada and English, he was asked to direct regional films such as Harishchandra (1932), Galav Rishi and Rama Paduka Pattabhishekam (1932) for Sagar. His first Hindi film for them was Chandrahasa (1933), following which he directed Grihalakshmi. He made satirical comedies such as Teen Sau Din Ke Baad (1938), and Ladies Only, both of which were big commercial successes. His specialty, however, was sensitive, socially relevant films, which included Dr. Madhurika, Ver Ka Badla, Jeevanlata, Village Girl, Kokila, Kulvadhu and Ladies Only. All these films had Sabita Devi as the leading lady, paired most often with Motilal. He left to join Dr. Ambalal Patel at Sudama Pictures.

Ezra Mir initially worked in Madan Studios in a few films as an actor. He went to Hollywood and joined Universal Studios, working in several categories, before returning to India in 1930. He was invited to work on Nurjehan (1930) by Ardeshir Irani. His next film direction Zarina (1932) was offered to him by Desai for Sagar, which became a success. His other films included Pagal Premi (Mad Cap) where he introduced Noor Mohammed Charlie in a main role and Farzand-E-Hind (Phantom Of The Hills) (1934). He then left Sagar and moved to Calcutta. He was to make a shift from feature films to documentaries, during WWII. He made a series of short films under the series Road To Recovery In 1940, he joined the Government Advisory Board.

The other directors of note at Sagar were C. M. Luhar, Virendra Desai (Desai’s second son), Nanubhai Desai and Ramchandra Thakur.

=== Others ===
Faredoon Irani was a noted cinematographer. He started his career as "an apprentice" at Imperial Films. His first independent film was a Gujarati short four-reeler; Shri Krishna Danlila, shown along with Meera Bai in 1932. His work in Bulbul-E-Baghdad was appreciated when the film became a big commercial success. Faredoon worked on Mehboob Khan's Al Hilal.

Anil Biswas started his career as a music director with his first film; Dharam Ki Devi (1935) at Indian Arts. Jagirdar (1937) was Biswas' first big success. His other films for Sagar were Kokila, Dynamite, Gramaphone Singer, Hum Tum Aur Woh, Postman, 300 Days And After, Watan, Comrades and Ek hi Raasta.

Zia Sarhadi wrote the lyrics, story, screenplay and dialogues for Sagar films. Other people of note working at Sagar were Safdar Aah, Pandit Indra, Wajahat Mirza, Pransukh Naik and S. P. Rane.

== National Studios ==
Sagar Movietone closed down by end of 1939. The last two completed films of Sagar were Civil Marriage (1939) and Alibaba (1940), with Kumkum The Dancer, a bilingual in Hindi and Bengali, scheduled to be released by Christmas 1939. "And that is the end of Sagar!" stated Filmindia in its December 1939 Studio Close-ups column.

The closure was reported by Baburao Patel, editor of cine-magazine Filmindia in his column "An Eventful Year" in the December 1939 issue,

"1939 will be sadly remembered as the year that saw the collapse of Sagar, one of the oldest studios in India. They seemed to have started the year fairly well with "Ladies Only" and "The Only Way" and had announced an ambitious programme including two bi-lingual pictures ("Ali Baba" in Punjabi and Hindustani and "Kumkum The Dancer" in Bengali and Hindustani) for which they considerably increased their staff of artistes and technicians. But then something went wrong, "Comrades" proved treacherous, there were rumours of mergers, closures, mortgages of pictures, reduction of staff, heart-breaks and tears until today the old Sagar glory is no more, and Seth Chimanlal Desai plays the second fiddle to the Fazalbhoys in the newly-formed National Studios. It is a sad, sad story with its own moral".

Desai, in association with Yusuf Fazalbhoy of General Pictures, amalgamated the two companies, Sagar Movietone and General Pictures, to form "National Studios" in 1939. The person of importance in National was Mehboob Khan, with his first film under National; Aurat (1940) becoming a big success both with the critics as well as the audiences.

== Filmography ==
| Year | Film | Director | Cast | Notes/Composer | Ref |
|---|---|---|---|---|---|
| 1930 | Dav Pech | Moti B. Gidwani | Master Vithal, Gohar, Yakub | Silent film | |
| 1930 | Nai Roshni (Royal Rivals) | Bhagwati Mishra | Jal Merchant, Ermeline, Yakub, Rajkumari | Silent film | |
| 1930 | Mewad No Mawali (Rogue Of Rajasthan) | Madanrai Vakil | Dinshaw Billimoria, Mehboob Khan, Nirasha | Silent film | |
| 1930 | Arunodaya (Dawn/Rising Sun) | Bhagwati Mishra | Master Vithal, Manorama, Yakub, Nirasha, Boman Irani, Wamanrao | Silent film | |
| 1930 | Veer Na Ver (The Conqueror) | Moti B. Gidwani | Master Vithal, Gohar | Silent film | |
| 1931 | Toofani Taruni (Cyclone Girl) | Moti B. Gidwani | Jal Merchant, Ermeline, Yakub, Laxmi | Silent film | |
| 1931 | Toofan (Children Of The Storm) | Bhagwati Mishra | Prithviraj Kapoor, Ermeline, Fali Merchant | Silent Film | |
| 1931 | Golibar (Avenging Angels) | Bhagwati Prasad Mishra | Ermeline, Prithviraj Kapoor, Mazhar Khan, Romila | Silent film | |
| 1931 | Meethi Chhuri (Eye For An Eye) | Madanrai Vakil | Zubeida, Khursheed Begum, Yakub, Ghulam Qadir | Silent film | |
| 1931 | Dilawar | R. G. Torney | Master Vithal, Pramila, Mubarak, Mehboob Khan | Silent film | |
| 1931 | Hoor-E-Misar (Land Of Pyramids) | Prafulla Ghosh | Master Vithal, Zubeida | Silent film | |
| 1931 | Abul Hasan | Prafulla Ghosh | Miss Khatoon, Master Bachchu, Shehzadi, Hadi | Silent film | |
| 1931 | Veer Abhimanyu | Prafulla Ghosh | Jal Merchant, Zubeida, Yakub, Jilloo, Mehboob Khan | Silent film | |
| 1931 | Meri Jaan (Romantic Prince) | Prafulla Ghosh | Master Vithal, Zubeida, Yakub, Sankatha Prasad | | |
| 1932 | Bulbule Baghdad (Fairy Of Baghdad) | Nanubhai Vakil | Master Bachchu, Sushila, Yakub, Miss Khatoon, Sushila | | |
| 1932 | Mirabai | Ramnik Desai | Zubeida, Jal Merchant, Sankatha Prasad, Miss Khatoon | S. P. Rane | |
| 1932 | Galava a.k.a. Galav Maharishi or Chitrasena upakhyana (Tamil) | D.R. Muthulakshmi, V. Sundaresh Iyer | | | |
| 1932 | Sarvottam Badami & T.C.Vadivelu Naicker | D.R. Muthulakshmi, V. Sundaresh Iyer, | | | |
| 1932 | Rama Paduka Pattabhishekam (The Coronation Of Lord Rama's Slippers) (Telugu) | Sarvottam Badami | Yadavalli Suryanarayana, C. S. R. Anjaneyulu, Surabhi Kamalabai | | |
| 1932 | Shakuntala (Telugu) | Sarvottam Badami | Yadavalli Suryanarayana, Surabhi Kamalabai | | |
| 1932 | Maya Bazar a.k.a. Surekha Haran (The Land Of Illusion) | Nanubhai Vakil | Master Bachchu, Khatoon, Yakub | S. P. Rane | |
| 1932 | Narsinh Mehta (Gujarati) | Nanubhai Vakil | Master Manhar, Mohanlala, Marutirao, Mehtab, Tikramdas, Jamna, Miss Khatoon | S. P. Rane | |
| 1932 | Subhadra Haran | Prafulla Ghosh | Zubeida, Master Bachchu, Jal Merchant, Sankatha Prasad | | |
| 1932 | Zarina | Ezra Mir | Zubeida, Jal Merchant, Noor Mohammed Charlie, Sankatha Prasad | S. P. Rane | |
| 1933 | Chandrahasa | Sarvottam Badami | Master Bachchu, Noor Mohammed Charlie, Gulzar, Kamala, Mehboob Khan, Baburao Sansare | 1st Hindi film directed by Badami. Music: S. P. Rane | |
| 1933 | Mahabharat also (Pandav Kaurav) | Nanubhai Vakil | Jal Merchant, Zubeida, Master Bachchu, Khatoon, Mehboob Khan | S. P. Rane | |
| 1933 | Mirza Sahiban | Nagendra Mazumdar | Master Bachchu, Kamalabai Gokhale, Dinkar S. Bidkar, Miss Gulzar, Mehboob Khan | S. P. Rane | |
| 1933 | Premi Pagal | Ezra Mir | Master Bachchu, Kamalabai, Miss Gulzar, Noor Mohammed Charlie | S. P. Rane | |
| 1934 | Anokhi Mohabbat | Ramnik Desai | Kumar, Sitara Devi, Yakub, Tarabai | Bairam Singh | |
| 1934 | Grihalaxmi | Sarvottam Badami | Sabita Devi, Jal Merchant, Yakub, Kamala Devi, K. C. Dey | S. P. Rane | |
| 1934 | Nachwali | Ramnik Desai | Jaddanbai, Yakub, Swarup Rani, Rafiqe Ghaznavi | Bairam Singh | |
| 1934 | Farzande Hind (Phantom Of The Hills) | Ezra Mir | Sabita Devi, Jal Merchant, Yakub, Noor Mohammed Charlie | S. P. Rane | |
| 1934 | Sati Anjani (Pious Anjani) also Hanuman Janma | Kanjibhai Rathod | Panna, Yakub, Asooji, Anees Khatoon | S. P. Rane | |
| 1934 | Shaher Ka Jadoo (Lure Of The City) | K. P. Ghosh (Kali Prasad Ghosh) | Kumar, Sitara Devi, K. C. Dey, Miss Gulzar, Tarabai | | |
| 1935 | Al Hilal | Mehboob Khan | Sitara Devi, Kumar, Indira Devi, Yakub, Azurie | Pransukh Naik | |
| 1935 | Dr. Madhurika | Sarvottam Badami | Motilal, Sabita Devi, Padma Shaligram, Bhudo Advani | Pransukh Naik, Ashok Ghosh | |
| 1935 | Silver King | C. M. Luhar | Motilal, Sabita Devi, Yakub, Asooji | Pransukh Naik | |
| 1935 | Vengeance Is Mine a.k.a. Ver Ni Vasulat | Sarvottam Badami | Motilal, Sabita Devi, Padma Shaligram, Yakub, Mehboob Khan | S. P. Rane | |
| 1936 | Deccan Queen | Mehboob Khan | Surendra, Aruna Devi, Bhudo Advani, Pesi Patel, Ramchandra | Pransukh Naik | |
| 1936 | Do Diwane (Two Rogues/Gay Birds) also Be Kharab Jaan | Chimanlal Luhar | Motilal, Shobhna Samarth, Aruna Devi, Yakub, Bhudo Advani | K. M. Munshi's play. Music: Pransukh Naik | |
| 1936 | Grama Kanya (Village Girl) | Sarvottam Badami | Surendra, Sabita Devi, Yakub, Aruna, Kayam Ali | Shankarrao Khatu | |
| 1936 | Jeevan Lata (The Creeper Of Life) | Sarvottam Badami | Sabita Devi, Motilal, Miss Gulzar, Sankatha Prasad | Pransukh Naik | |
| 1936 | Lagna Bandhan (The Bonds Of Marriage/The Forbidden Bride) | K. P. Ghosh | Motilal, Sabita Devi, Aruna Devi, Lilvati, Azurie | Pransukh Naik | |
| 1936 | Manmohan | Mehboob Khan | Surendra, Bibbo, Yakub, Ashalata | Anil Biswas | |
| 1936 | Veer Abhimanyu (Telugu) | V. D. Amin | Kanchanmala | | |
| 1937 | Bhakt Shri Thiagraj (Tamil) | V. C. Desai | Mangalam Natesar, Kamala | | |
| 1937 | Captain Kirti Kumar | C. M. Luhar | Motilal, Bibbo, Krishna Kumari, Yakub, Sankatha Prasad | Bhaskar Rao | |
| 1937 | Jagirdar | Mehboob Khan | Surendra, Motilal, Yakub, Bibbo, Zia Sarhadi | Anil Biswas | |
| 1937 | Kokila | Sarvottam Badami | Motilal, Sabita Devi, Shobhna Samarth, Yakub, Maya Bannerjee, Sitara Devi | Anil Biswas | |
| 1937 | Kulvadhu | Sarvottam Badami | Motilal, Sabita Devi, Gulzar, Pesi Patel | Pransukh Naik | |
| 1937 | Sagar Ka Sher (Lion Of Sagar) | Yakub | Yakub, Kamlabai, Sankatha Prasad, Pesi Patel | Pransukh Naik | |
| 1938 | Dynamite | C. M. Luhar | Surendra, Bibbo, Maya Bannerjee, Yakub, Bhudo Advani | Anil Biswas | |
| 1938 | Gramaphone Singer | V. C. Desai, Ramchandra Thakur | Surendra, Bibbo, Prabha Devi, Bhudo Advani, Kayam Ali | Anil Biswas | |
| 1938 | Hum Tum Aur Woh (We Three) | Mehboob Khan | Motilal, Maya Bannerji, Yakub, Rose | Anil Biswas | |
| 1938 | Three Hundred Days And After | Sarvottam Badami | Motilal, Sabita Devi, Yakub, Bibbo, Sankatha Prasad, Pesi Patel | Anil Biswas | |
| 1938 | Jalaja (Tamil) | Gautam K. Sheshagiri | Bhanumathi, G. K. Sheshagiri | N. Ananthram | |
| 1938 | Desa Munnetram (Tamil) | Mahendra Thakore | K. R. Chellam, M. Natesan Iyer, Baby Rukmani, Shripat Shankar, S. R. Padma | 50 song soundtrack. Music: Papanasam Sivam, K. Sundaram | |
| 1938 | Valibar Sangam (Tamil) | A. N. Kalyansundaram Iyer | Baby Kamala (Kamala Kumari) | | |
| 1938 | Ramnam Mahimai (Tamil) | A. N. Kalyansundaram Iyer | Baby Kamala (Kamala Kumari) | | |
| 1939 | Ek Hi Raasta (The Only Way) | Mehboob Khan | Arun, Sheikh Mukhtar, Jyoti, Harish | Anil Biswas | |
| 1939 | Sadhana | V. C. Desai, Mahendra Thakore | Prem Adib, Bibbo, Shobhana Samarth, Harish, Kanhaiyalal | Anupam Ghatak | |
| 1939 | Seva Samaj (Service Limited) | C. M. Luhar | Surendra, Maya Bannerjee, Bibbo, Yakub, BHudo Advani | Anupam Ghatak | |
| 1940 | Ali Baba | Mehboob Khan | Bibbo, Wahidan Bai, Surendra, Sardar Akhtar | Anil Biswas | |
| 1940 | Kumkum The Dancer (Hindi/Bengali) | Modhu Bose | Sadhana Bose, Dhiraj Bhattacharya, Padma Devi, Preeti Majumdar, Moni Chatterjee | Timir Baran | |

== See also ==
- Ardeshir Irani
- Mehboob Khan
- Sarvottam Badami

== Bibliography ==
- Sagar Movietone; by Biren Kothari. Translated by Parth Pandya. Saarthak Prakashan, Ahmedabad, Gujarat, India, 2014. ISBN 9788192686868
- Profile at Book Buy
