= Vengeance Is Mine (1935 film) =

Vengeance is Mine
- Directed by: Sarvottam Badami
- Written by: K. M. Munshi
- Produced by: Sagar Movietone
- Starring: Sabita Devi; Kumar; Yakub; K. C. Dey
- Cinematography: Faredoon Irani
- Music by: S. P. Rane
- Production company: Sagar Movietone
- Release date: 1935
- Country: India
- Language: Hindi

Vengeance is Mine (Ver Ni Vasulat) also called Vair Ka Badla is a 1935 social Hindi film directed by Sarvottam Badami based on K. M. Munshi's story. After directing three regional language films for Sagar Movietone, Badami was now directing films exclusively in Hindi. After the first Hindi film he directed Chandrahasa (1933), he shifted his focus to socially relevant topics and made two films based on Munshi's stories, Vengeance is Mine (1935) and Dr. Madhurika (1935). Vengeance is Mine was made on a story Munshi had written in Gujarati language as "Ver Ni Vasulat" in 1913 under the nom de plume "Ghanshyam". The cast included Kumar, Sabita Devi, Yakub, Sitara Devi, Padma Devi and Mehboob Khan.

== Cast ==
- Kumar
- Sitara Devi
- Mehboob Khan
- Sabita Devi
- Yakub
- Padma Shaligram
- Ansari

== Song list ==
| # | Title |
|---|---|
| 1 | "Aao Aao Mere Rajdulare" |
| 2 | "Aji Wah Wah Pran Pyare Tum Chhail Chhabile Baanke" |
| 3 | "Ghamjuda Dard Juda Ranj Juda" |
| 4 | "Har Ghanshyam Hari" |
| 5 | "Jitney Tare Gagan Mein Utne Shatru Hoya" |
| 6 | "Jo Main Aisa Jaanti Preet Kiye Dukh Hoye" |
| 7 | "Kasht Pade Kaayar Ghabraaye" |
| 8 | "Phool Chunane Jo Gayi Main Sajani" |
| 9 | "Rovat Bhaag Suhag Ko Nain Swami Chhin Liyo" |
| 10 | "Yeh Saara Kasht Mit Sakta Hai Kuchh Din Shaant Hone Se" |
