= Bibbo (actress) =

Hindi and Urdu film actress (1906–1972)

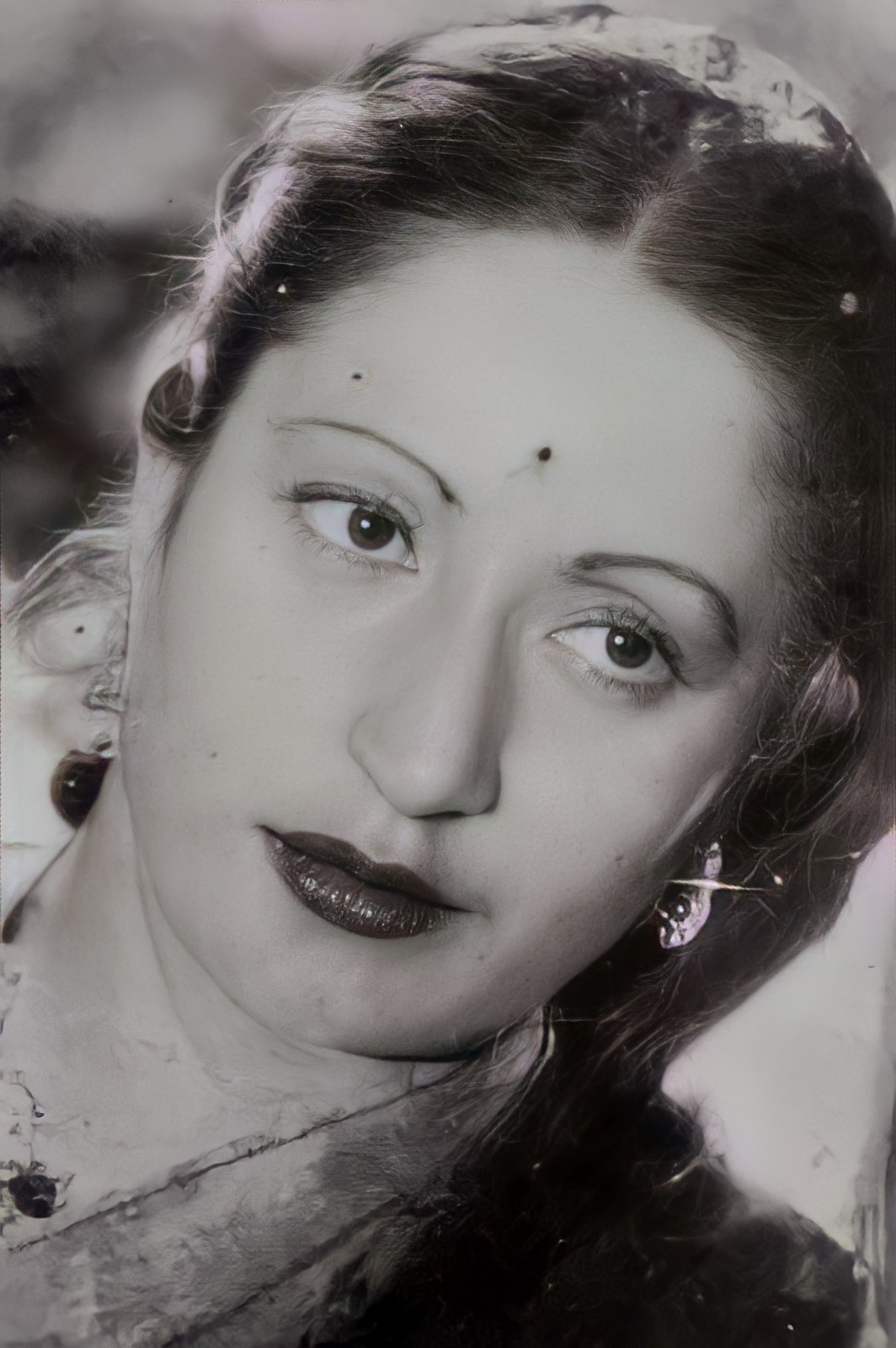
- Image of Bibbo from Sneh Bandhan (1940)
- Born: Ishrat Sultana; 1906; Delhi, British India
- Died: 25 May 1972 (aged 65–66); Karachi, Sindh, Pakistan
- Burial place: Karachi
- Occupations: Actress; Composer; Singer; Music director
- Years active: 1931 - 1972
- Known for: First Female Music Director of Indian Cinema
- Spouse: Khalil Sardar

Bibbo (born Ishrat Sultana 1906 – 1972) was a music composer, singer and actress who worked in both Indian and Pakistani films. She acted in Indian cinema from 1931 to 1947 before moving to Pakistan, following Partition of India in 1947. She started her acting career with Ajanta Cinetone Ltd. in 1933, working with directors like Mohan Bhavnani and A. P. Kapoor. She was one of the top leading ladies of the 1930s along with actresses like Devika Rani, Durga Khote, Sulochana, Mehtab, Shanta Apte, Sabita Devi, Leela Desai and Naseem Banu. She was referred to as "one of the most important female stars of the 1930s and 1940s". Her fame had her featured in the lyrics of a popular song from the film Gharib Ke Lal (1939) sung by Mirza Musharraf and Kamla Karnataki, with music by Sagheer Asif and lyrics by Rafi Kashmiri. "Tujhe Bibbo Kahoon Ke Sulochana" (Should I call you Bibbo or Sulochana?), where Sulochana referred to another popular actress of the time. This was the first time a song featuring famous actors was used in the lyrics of a film song.

Bibbo became the first female music composer of Indian cinema, when she composed the music for Adal-e-Jahangir in 1934, a year before Jaddanbai, mother of actress Nargis, composed music for Talash-e-Haq (1935). She was also the music director for a film called Qazzak Ki Ladki (1937).

She worked with actors like Master Nissar, Surendra and Kumar. She formed a popular working relationship with them. Her pairing with Surendra was especially well-liked with the pair giving several hits like Manmohan (1936), Jagirdar (1937), Gramaphone Singer (1938), Dynamite (1938) and Ladies Only (1939). Her first film was Rangila Rajput, followed by Mayajaal, both in 1933. She worked in nearly thirty films as a lead actress in India from 1933 to 1947, shifting to character roles in later years, following her move to Pakistan. She won the Nigar Award for the best character actress for her role in the Pakistani film Zehr-e-Ishq (1958).

== Early life ==
Bibbo was born Ishrat to a famous singer Hafeezan Begum. She was cited as being a famous singer and tawaif from Delhi, who came to Bombay to join films. Bibbo was a trained singer, with a voice having a "coarse husky quality" like Zohrabai Ambalewali's and Shamshad Begum's.

== Career ==
=== In India ===
Bibbo acted in the 1931 film Alam Ara which is her first film and she played the role of a friend to Alam Ara, the film's lead character, which was played by Zubeida. Alam Ara is considered the first sound film in India, and it also featured Prithviraj Kapoor and Master Vithal. Bibbo's second film but it is her first recorded film it was the successful Rangila Rajput (The Gay Cavalier) (1933), directed by Mohan Bhavnani and starring Master Nissar, with popular music by B. S. Hoogan. Her second film that year for Ajanta was Mayajaal, a fantasy directed by Shanti L. Dave for Ajanta Cinetone Ltd., co-starring Master Nissar, P. Jairaj and Shahzadi, with music composed by B. S. Hoogan. Her acting was appreciated by the Hindi journalist Pitambar Jha, who predicted a bright future for her in his article in the Hindi magazine, Chitrapat 1934.

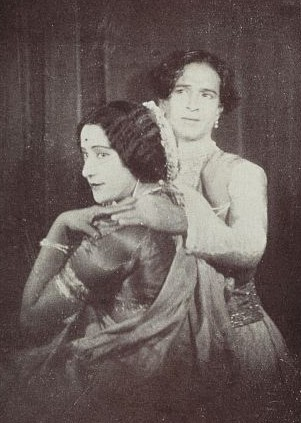
Bibbo with Master Nissar in a publicity still for Dukhtar-e-Hind (1934)

In 1934, Bibbo acted in five films. Vasavdatta or the Shahi Gawaiya (The Royal Musician) was her third film. It was produced by Ajanta and directed by P. Y. Altekar, with B. Sohni and Jairaj as co-stars. The music was by B. S. Hoogan. The story revolved around King Udyan, who is obsessively in love with his wife, ignoring his kingdom in the process. She was then cast in her fourth film, Mohan Bhavnani's Sair-E-Paristan, produced by Ajanta Cinetone Ltd. and co-starring P. Jairaj, Khalil Aftab, Master Nissar and W. M. Khan. A fantasy, the story was about three Princes falling in love with the same girl. The music was composed by B. S. Hoogan.

It was in 1934, that Bibbo composed music for a film called Adal-e-Jehangir, thus becoming the first Indian female composer. The Mill, also called Mazdoor was directed by Mohan Bhavnani, and starred Bibbo, who played the mill owner's daughter in the film with Motilal as the hero. The film was controversial and was banned for a few years.

In 1936, she acted in Garib Parivar and Manmohan. She was cast by Mehboob Khan in Manmohan, a film made to compete with Calcutta's New Theatres Ltd famous film Devdas. Her co-star was Surendra and the film went on to become a commercial success with the songs becoming popular.

1937 saw her acting in four films, out of which Jagirdar, directed by Mehboob Khan and co-starring Surendra, was the most famous. The film was a "romantic melodrama", with Bibbo and Surendra playing actor Motilal's parents in the latter part. Though made on a small budget, it went on to do big business commercially for Sagar Movietone. She acted in, and once again composed music for the film Qazzak Ki Ladki, using the name Ishrat Sultana as composer. The film co-starred Surendra and was directed by Sultan Mirza and S. Varman for Rainbow Films.

1938 proved to be a successful year for her with all five films doing well at the box office. Watan, produced by Sagar Studios and directed by Mehboob Khan was a quasi-historical costume drama involving Tartars, with a nationalistic element. The film starred Kumar, Yakub and Maya Bannerjee with music by Anil Biswas.

Gramaphone Singer (1938) and Dynamite (1938), had her pairing with Surendra again. Both films went on to become successful. Gramaphone Singer was a love triangle directed by V. C. Desai, which had Bibbo playing the other woman, with Prabha playing Surendra's wife. Teen Sau Din Ke Baad, also called 300 Days And After, was a Sagar film directed by Sarvottam Badami. It had Motilal, Sabita Devi and Yakub starring with Bibbo. With music by Anil Biswas, the film went on to do well. Baburao Patel of Filmindia called it "easily the best picture to come out of Sagar".

In 1939, Ladies Only co-starred Bibbo with Prabha, Sabita Devi and Surendra in a comedy film directed by Sarvottam Badami for Sagar Movietone. The music was composed by Anupam Ghatak. According to Filmindia editor Baburao Patel, Bibbo in her role "shines out with her vigorous performance". Laxmi with Kumar, Maya, Gope, Jeevan and Indira was directed by Mohan Sinha, with music composed by Timir Baran. The Times of India review quoted in Filmindia commented: "Bibbo is brilliant as the other woman and very nearly steals the picture with her wonderfully sympathetic role".

Sneh Bandhan had Bibbo pairing with Navin Yagnik and E. Billimoria in a melodrama about love and sacrifice. Bibbo's acting was lauded with the reviewer commenting "Never before has she looked so charming and… never before has she acquitted herself so well in her work. She takes the complete burden of the drama and gives a beautiful performance throughout".

Akela (1941) released in 1941, starred Bibbo with Mazhar Khan and E. Billimoria. The film was produced by Kikubhai Desai and directed by Pesi Karani. The film described as a sensible picture for the intelligentsia and the masses, was a big success commercially.

In 1945 she acted in Zeenat, starring Noor Jehan, the film went on to become a big hit for Noor Jehan. It was directed by Shaukat Hussain Rizvi with music composed by Mir Saheb. Pehli Nazar was another film in 1945 opposite Veena, Munawwar Sultana and Motilal. Directed by Mazhar Khan for Mazhar Art, it had music by Anil Biswas. Bibbo's last film in India was Pahela Pyar (First Love) (1947), directed by A. P. Kapoor for Sagar Movietone.

=== In Pakistan ===
Bibbo shifted to Pakistan following partition of India in 1947. She started working in films there as a character artist doing about forty films from 1950 to 1972.

Her first film in Pakistan was Shammi (1950), a Punjabi picture directed by Munshi Dil. She co-starred with Shammi, Santosh and Ajmal. It had music composed by Master Inayat Hussain.

Dupatta (1952), an Urdu film directed by Sibtain Fazli and produced by Aslam Lodhi, starred Noor Jehan, Sudhir, Ajay Kumar and Yasmin along with Bibbo. The film was acclaimed as a big hit commercially and had music composed by Firoz Nizami, with songs sung by Noor Jehan.

Zahr-e-Ishq was released in April 1958. Produced by Khwaja Khurshid Anwar and Sultan Jilani under the banner of Select Pictures, it starred Musarrat Nazir, Habib, Yasmin, Neelo and Bibbo. The music was by Khurshid Anwar, with lyrics by Qateel Shifai. Hailed as an "excellent film" by the reviewer, it won Bibbo the Nigar Award for best character actress.

Jhoomer is a 1959 film directed by Masud Pervez, with music composed Khurshid Anwar. Produced by Anwar for Noor Minar Pictures banner, it starred Musarrat Nazir, Sudhir and Laila.

Ghunghat (1962), a suspense-thriller drama, was directed by Khurshid Anwar, who also wrote the story and composed the music. The cast included Nayyar Sultana, Santosh, Neelo, Laila and Bibbo.

Bibbo acted in a few more films, with Fanoos (1963) Ishq Par Zor Nahin (1963) and Ghalib being commendable from her acting point of view, though the films were successful commercially. Her other cited film is Armaan (1966), directed by Parvez Malik, with music by Sohail Rana.

== Personal life ==
Bibbo was married by the end of the 1930s to Khalil Sardar, who directed her in Adal-e-Jahangir, for which she gave music. Following the marriage, they left Bombay and moved to Lahore, where they produced a film under the banner of Rainbow films, Qazzak Ki Ladki (1937), where she was also the music director. The film was a commercial failure and Bibbo finally returned to Bombay. Following Partition in 1947, Bibbo moved to Pakistan, where she worked as a character artiste. According to Zulqarnain Shahid (The Weekly MAG, Pakistan) re-published in Cineplot, it was stated that Bibbo was married to Shahnawaz Bhutto, Zulfiqar Ali Bhutto's father. This is doubtful because in the June 1943 issue of Filmindia, Baburao Patel answered a query about Bibbo claiming she was "indeed married to Imdad Bhutto".

== Death ==
She died on 25 May 1972 in Karachi, Pakistan and was laid to rest at a Karachi cemetery.

== Filmography ==
=== In India ===
Her films list:

Year	Film	Director	Co-stars	Composer	Studio
1931	Alam Ara	Ardeshir Irani	Master Vithal, Zubeida, Prithviraj Kapoor	Firozshah Mistry, B. Irani	Imperial Film Co.
1933	Rangila Rajput a.k.a. The Gay Cavalier	Mohan Bhavnani	Master Nissar	B. S. Hoogan	Ajanta Cinetone Ltd.
1933	Mayajaal	Mohan Bhavnani	Master Nissar, P. Jairaj, Shahzadi	B. S. Hoogan	Ajanta Cinetone Ltd.
1933	Mirza Sahiban	Nagendra Mazumdar	Noor Jehan, Mehboob Khan, Kamla, Kashi Nath	S.P. Roy	Sagar Movietone
1933	Shan Subhan	Faridon Irani	Noor Jehan, Sultana, Agha Jani, Aziz, Rouf	F.R Irani	Barma Film Co. Rangoon
1934	Vasavdatta or the Shahi Gawaiya a.k.a. The Royal Musician	P. Y. Altekar	B. Sohni and Jairaj	B. S. Hoogan	Ajanta Cinetone Ltd.
1934	Sair-e-Paristan a.k.a. Shan-e-Khuda a.k.a. Journey Through the Land of Fairies	Mohan Bhavnani	Master Nissar, Khalil, P. Jairaj	B. S. Hoogan	Ajanta Cinetone Ltd.
1934	The Mill a.k.a. Mazdoor	Mohan Bhavnani	Khalil, Navin Yagnik, Jairaj	B. S. Hoogan	Ajanta Cinetone Ltd.
1934	Adal-e-Jehangir	Khalil Sardar	Anwar Begum, Kantilal, Nawab Begum, Padmavati Shaligram	Bibbo	Rainbow Pictures
1934	Dukhtare-Hind	A. P. Kapoor	Master Nissar, Tara, Navin Yagnik	Jhande Khan	Ajanta Cinetone Ltd.
1935	Pyar Ki Maar a.k.a. The Onslaught of Love a.k.a. Queen's Wrath	A. P. Kapoor	Navin Yagnik, Gohar Karnataki, A. P. Kapoor	B. S. Hoogan	Ajanta Cinetone Ltd.
1936	Suhag ka Daan	J.K. Nanda	Nandi Khanna, Anwari, Heera Lal, Jaggal Kishawr, J.L. Madhokk	Master Ghulam Haider	Taj Productions
1936	Qazzaq ki Larki	Sardar Khalil Khan	Muzammal, Khurshid, Surendra, Dar Kashmiri, Daaman, Dr. Samad, Mirza Musharraf, Surla	Bibbo	Rainbow Pictures
1936	Garib Parivar	Mohan Bhavnani	Khali, Ameena, Jairaj	S.P. Mukarjee	Ajanta Cinetone Ltd.
1936	Manmohan	Mehboob Khan	Surendra, Yakub, Ashalata	Ashok Ghosh	Sagar Movietone
1937	Jagirdar	Mehboob Khan	Surendra, Motilal, Yakub	Anil Biswas	Sagar Movietone
1937	Sagar Ka Sher a.k.a. Lion of Sagar	Yakub	Yakub, David, Kayamali	Pransukh M. Nayak	Sagar Movietone
1937	Captain Kirti Kumar	C. M. Luhar (Chimanlal Muljhibhoy Luhar)	Motilal, Krishna Kumari, Yakub	Bhaskar Rao	Sagar Movietone
1937	Qazzak Ki Ladki	Sultan Mirza, S. Varman	Surendra, Sushila, Sarla	Ishrat Sultana (Bibbo)	Rainbow Films
1938	Watan	Mehboob Khan	Kumar, Yakub, Maya Bannerjee	Anil Biswas	Sagar Movietone, Bombay
1938	Teen Sau Din Ke Baad	Sarvottam Badami	Sabita Devi, Motilal, Yakub	Anil Biswas	Sagar Movietone, Bombay
1938	Gramaphone Singer	V. C. Desai (Virendra Chimanlal Desai)	Surendra, Prabha, Kanhaiyalal	Anil Biswas	Sagar Movietone
1938	Dynamite	C. M. Luhar	Surendra, Yakub, Maya Bannerjee	Anil Biswas	Sagar Movietone
1938	Abhilasha a.k.a. Postman	Zia Sarhadi, Mahendra Thakore	Kumar, Yakub, Maya Bannerjee	Anil Biswas	Sagar Movietone, Bombay
1939	Seva Samaj a.k.a. Service Ltd. or Service Limited	C. M. Luhar	Surendra, Yakub, Maya Bannerjee	Anupam Ghatak	Sagar Movietone
1939	Bhole Bhale	Zia Sarhadi	Maya Bannerjee, Prem Adib, Arun	Anupam Ghatak	Sagar Movietone
1939	Ladies Only	Sarvottam Badami	Surendra, Prabha, Sabita Devi	Anupam Ghatak	Sagar Movietone
1939	Sadhana	V. C. Desai	Shobhana Samarth, Prem Adib, Harish, Kanhaiyalal, Pande, Bhudo Advani, Gulzar	Anupam Ghatak	Sagar Movietone
1940	Lakshmi	Mohan Sinha	Maya Kumar, Jeevan, Gope, Mehdi, Raza, Ghulam Rasool, Bibi	Timir Barn	His Master's Voice
1940	Sohag a.k.a. Suhag a.k.a. Sign of Marriage	Balwant Bhatt	Kumar, Mazhar Khan, Ashalata	Timir Baran	Circo Productions
1940	Sneh Bandhan	J. P. Advani (Jagatrai Pesumal Advani)	E. Billimoria, Navin Yagnik	Pannalal Ghosh	Great India Pictures
1940	Akela	Pesi Kiran	Mazhar Khan, E. Bilimoria, Moti, Bos, Hadi, Pritma Devi	Khan Mastana	Great India Pictures
1941	Mere Raja	T. M. Mani	E. Billimoria, Mazhar Khan, Miss Moti	Damodar Sharma	Paramount Pictures
1941	Akela ak.a. Alone	Pesi Karani	Mazhar Khan, E. Billimoria	Khan Mastana	Kikubhai Desai
1944	Bade Nawab Saheb	Vedi	Chandra Mohan, Pahari Sanyal, Kumar	Bashir Dehlvi	Silver Films
1945	Naseeb	Deedi	Kumar, Parmila, Agha, Chanda Bai, Jillo Bai, Najma, Devid	Pandat Gobind Ram	Silver Films
1945	Pehli Nazar	Mazhar Khan	Motilal, Veena, Munawwar Sultana	Anil Biswas	Mazhar Art
1945	Zeenat	Shaukat Hussain Rizvi	Noor Jehan, Karan Dewan, Nazir, Yakub, Leela Mishra, Jilloo	Rafiq Ghaznavi	Salma Talkie Distributors
1946	Sassi Punnu	J. P. Advani	E. Billimoria, Geeta Nizami, Jairaj, Gope	Gobindram	Vaswani Art
1947	Pahela Pyar	A. P. Kapoor	Vanmala, K. N. Singh, Agha	Premnath (composer)	Sagar Movietone

=== In Pakistan ===
Her films list:

Year	Film	Director	Co-stars	Composer	Producer
1950	Shammi (Punjabi)	Munshi Dil	Shammi, Santosh Kumar, Ghulam Mohammad, Ajmal, Bibbo	Master Inayat Hussain	Malika Pictures
1951	Akeli (Urdu)	M.M. Mehra	Ragni, Santosh Kumar, Bibbo, Reshma, Nazar, Maya Devi, Noor Mohammed Charlie	Master Ghulam Haidar	Krishan Kumar
1952	Dopatta (Urdu)	Sibtain Fazli	Noor Jehan, Ajay Kumar, Sudhir, Yasmin, Bibbo	Feroz Nizami	Aslam Lodhi
1953	Gulnar (Urdu)	Imtiaz Ali Taj	Noor Jehan, Santosh, Zarif, Shah Nawaz, Bibbo	Ghulam Haider	Mian Rafiq
1954	Raat Ki Baat (Urdu)	Anwar Kamal Pasha	Sabiha, Santosh, Shamim, Gulshan Ara, Asif Jah, Allauddin, Himaliawala, Nighat Sultana, Bibbo, Sadiq Ali, Ajmal	Master Inayat Hussain	Saifuddin Saif
1954	Sassi (Urdu)	Daud Chand	Sabiha, Sudhir, Asha Posley, Nazar, Saleem Raza, Ghulam Mohammad, Shah Nawaz, Zeenat, Bibbo, Maya Devi	G.A. Chishti	J.C. Anand
1955	Nazrana (Urdu)	Murtaza Jeelani	Ragni, Santosh, Nazar, Zeenat, Azad, Allauddin, Shah Nawaz, Nasrin, Asha Poslay, Bibbo, Ghulam Mohammad	Tufail Farooqi	Syed Faqir Hussain Shah
1955	Jheel Kinaray (Urdu)	Nazim Nakhuda	Gulshan Ara, Sudhir, Geeta Nizami, Bibbo, Asha Poslay, Zarif, Ajmal, Shah Nawaz	Nazir Jafri	A. Majeed
1955	Sohni (Urdu)	M.J. Rana	Sabiha, Sudhir, Shammi, Nazar, Zeenat, Saleem Raza, Hamliyawala, A. Shah, Bibbo, Emi Minwala	Feroz Nizami	M.A. Khan
1955	Qatil (Urdu)	Anwar Kamal Pasha	Sabiha, Santosh, Musarrat Nazir, Aslam Parvez, Nayyar Sultana, Asif Jah, M. Ismael, Azad, Bibbo, Samina, Ajmal	Master Inayat Hussain	Agha G.A. Gul
1956	Umar Marvi (Sindhi)	Sheikh Hasan	Nighat Sultana, Noor Mohammed Charlie, Bibbo	G. Nabi	Fazlani
1956	Kaarnama (Urdu)	Iqbal Hussain	Laddan, Kalawati, Sawan, Bibbo	Nathoo Khan	M. M. Hussain
1956	Kunwari Beva (Urdu)	Najam Naqvi	Shamim Ara, Nazar, Bibbo, Ayaz, Mohammad Hanif Azad, Laddan, Shah Nawaz	Rasheed Attray	A.G. Mirza
1956	Mandi (Urdu)	Aziz Ahmad	Khursheed Bano, Ayyaz, Nighat Sultana, Shad, Bibbo, Klawawti, Ghori, Shahnawaz	Rafiq Ghaznavi	Nisar Ahmad
1957	Bedari (Urdu)	Rafiq Rizvi	Rattan Kumar, Santosh, Ragni, Salim Raza, Shah Nawaz, Abbas Ajmeri, Lehri, Bibbo, Anoradha, Qazi Wajid	Fateh Ali Khan	Sheikh Hassan Latif
1957	Pasban (Urdu)	Haidar Shah	Sabiha Khanum, Allauddin, Nighat Sultana, Bibbo, Asha Posley, Neelo, Zarif, Aslam Perviaz	Rasheed Attray	A. Qayum, M. Rafiq
1958	Zehr-e-Ishq (Urdu)	Masood Parvez	Musarrat Nazir, Habib, Neelo, Bibbo, Maya Devi	Khwaja Khurshid Anwar (assisted by Manzoor)	Select Pictures, Sultan Gilani
1958	Anarkali (Urdu)	Anwar Kamal Pasha	Noor Jehan, Sudhir, Ragni, Bibbo, Shamim Ara, M. Ajmal	Rashid Attre	Nigar Pictures
1958	Mukhra (Punjabi)	Jaffer Malik	Santosh Kumar, Darpan, Bibbo, Sabiha Khanum, Ilyas Kashmiri, Asha Posley, Nayyar Sultana, Nazar, Yasmin	Rasheed Attre	Crescent Pictures of Mian Ehsan
1958	Bharosa (Urdu)	Jafar Bukhari	Yasmin, Laila, Maya Devi, Yusuf Khan, Husna, Talish, Allauddin	A. Hameed	Chodhary Allauddin
1958	Jan-e-Bahar (Urdu)	Shaukat Hussain Rizvi	Musarrat Nazir, Sudhir, Bibbo, Husna, Saleem Raza, Shah Nawaz, Ali Baba, Nighat Sultana, Abbas Nosha, Diljeet Mirza	Rasheed Attray	Shah Noor Films
1959	Aaj Kal (Urdu)	Munawar H. Qasim	Sabiha, Kemal, Rehan, Bibbo, Ajmal, Fazal Haq, Rakhshi, G.N. Butt, Kamla	Musleuddin, Amanat Ali	Munawar H. Qasim
1959	Jhoomar (Urdu)	Khurshid Anwar	Musarrat Nazir, Sudhir, Laila, Bibbo	Khurshid Anwar	Noor-e-Minar Pictures
1959	Raaz (Urdu)	Humayun Mirza	Musarrat Nazir, Ejaz, Bibbo, Shamim Ara, Talish, Allauddin, Diljeet Mirza, Rekha, Majeed	Feroz Nizami	Humayun Mirza
1960	Rahguzar (Urdu)	Zia Sarhadi	Sabiha, Aslam Parvez, Nayyar Sultana, Bibbo, Laila, Nighat Sultana, Allauddin, Talish	Muslehuddin	Chodhary Eid Mohammad
1960	Aladin Ka Beta (Urdu)	Riaz Ahmad Raju	Neelo, Rattan Kumar, Nasira, Rukhsana, Lehri, Saqi, Fazal Haq, Rehan, Bibbo, Imdad Hussain	G.A. Chishti	Wazir Ali
1960	Khyber Mail (Urdu)	Agha Hussaini	Neelo, Aslam Pervaiz, Talish, Nayyar Sultana, Husna, Nasira, Zahoor Raja, Ghulam Mohammad, Bibbo, G.N. Butt	G.A. Chishti	Khadim Hussain Khawaja
1960	Salma (Urdu)	Ashfaq Malik	Yasmin, Ejaz, Bahar, Allauddin, Rukhsana, Bibbo, A. Shah Shikarpuri, Talish, Rakhshi, Rangeela, Salma Mumtaz	Rasheed Attray	Ashfaq Malik
1960	Daku Ki Larki (Urdu)	Humayun Mirza	Musarrat Nazir, Ejaz, Nayyar Sultana, Diljeet Mirza, Allauddin, Himaliawala, Emi Minuwala, Ali Baba, Shakir, Bibbo, Sultan Rahi	Rasheed Attray	Humayun Mirza
1960	Saheli (Urdu)	S. M. Yusuf	Nayyar Sultana, Darpan, Shamim Ara, Bahar, Aslam Pervaiz, Agha Talish, Nirala, Faizi, Sharara, Salma Mumtaz, G.N. Butt, Bibbo, Lehri	A. Hameed	F.M. Sardar, S.M. Yousuf
1961	Surayya (Urdu)	Shabab Keranvi	Nayyar Sultana, Habib, Asad Bukhari, Bibbo, Aslam Parvez, Zeenat, Ali Baba, Shehzad, Nasira, Rukhsana, Azad, Rangeela	Akhtar Hussain, Mohammad Ali Munnu	Mujaddad Ali
1961	Bombay Wala (Urdu)	Mushir Kazmi	Nayyar Sultana, Jemal, Saqi, Nighat Sultana, Sawan, Zamurrad, Ismael Qamar, Bibbo, Rakhshi	Rehman Verma	A.H. Ansari
1961	Jadoogar (Urdu)	M.A. Rafiq	Husna, Kemal, Bahar, Sultan, A. Shah, Bibbo, Naeem Hashmi	Saleem Iqbal, Nazir Jafri, Kousar Parveen	M.A. Rasheed
1961	Ghazi Bin Abbas (Urdu)	Zahoor Raja	Husna, Rattan Kumar, Nazar, Bibbo, Nasira, Saqi, Himaliawala, Emi Minuwala	Safdar Hussain	Jamal Art Concern
1961	Do Rastay (Urdu)	Qadeer Ghori	Neelo, Ejaz, Yusuf Khan, Bahar, Nasira, M. Ismael, Talish, Bibbo, Allauddin, Azad, Emi Menuwala, Ali Baba	Master Inayat Hussain	Malik Mohammad Rafiq
1961	Ghalib (Urdu)	Syed Atta Ullah Shah Hashmi	Noor Jehan, Sudhir, Yasmin, Laila, Shola, Diljeet Mirza, Bibbo, Saleem Raza, Saqi, Rehan, G.N. Butt, Gharib Shah, Khursheed Shahid	Tasadduq Hussain	S.K. Pictures
1962	Anchal (Urdu)	Al-Hamid	Shamim Ara, Darpan, Bibbo, Panna, Salma Mumtaz, Lehri, Talish, Azad, Ajmal	Khalil Ahmad	S.M. Farid
1962	Ghunghat (Urdu)	Khurshid Anwar	Nayyar Sultana, Santosh Kumar, Neelo, Bibbo	Khurshid Anwar	Select Pictures
1963	Fanoos (Urdu)	Nakhshab	Komal, Salman Pirzada, Abbas Nosha, Bibbo, Ilyas Kashmiri, Hanif	Saif Chughtai, Rasheed Attray	Nakhshab
1963	Damaad (Urdu)	Iqbal Mufti	Laila, Nazar, Bibbo, Naghma, A. Shah, Aslam Pervaiz, Asad Bukhari, Sultan	Tasadduq Hussain	Wazir Ali
1963	Baji (Urdu)	S. Suleman	Nayyar Sultana, Darpan, Zeba, Bibbo, Panna, Salma Mumtaz, Emi Menuwala, Lehri	Saleem Iqbal	Azizullah Hassan
1963	Ishq Par Zor Nahin (Urdu)	Sharif Nayyar	Neelo, Aslam Pervaiz, Jamila Razzaq, Ilyas Kashmiri, Bibbo	Master Inayat Hussain	Ilyas Kashmiri
1963	Dulhan (Urdu)	S.M. Yousuf	Shamim Ara, Habib, Darpan, Nasira, Bibbo, Lehri, Nabeela, S. Gul, Nayyar Sultana, Salma Mumtaz, Rehana	Rasheed Attray	J.C. Anand
1963	Aurat Ek Kahani (Urdu)	Younis Rahi	Nayyar Sultana, Ragni, Bibbo, Ejaz, Gotam, Panna, Abbas Nosha, Allauddin, ChhamChham, Husna	Masoom Rahim	Khawaja Masoom Hassan, Younis Rahi
1964	Khandan (Urdu)	Riaz Ahmad	Bahar Begum, Kemal, Bibbo, Meena Shorey, Naghma, Hina, Firdous Begum, Habib, Muhammad Ali, Rekha, Agha Talish	Rehman Verma	Riaz Ahmad
1964	Deevana (Urdu)	Zahoor Raja	Sabiha Khanum, Habib, Deeba, Bibbo, Ejaz, Nusrat Kardar, Zareen Panna, Rehan, Nasrin, Ilyas Kashmiri	Muslehuddin	Malik Mubarak Ahmad
1964	Chhoti Behan (Urdu)	A.H. Siddiqi	Rani, Kemal, Bibbo, Muhammad Ali, Sabira Sultana, Rozina, Talat Siddiqui, Lehri, Nirala	Lal Mohammad Iqbal	Usman Khaitani
1966	Armaan (Urdu)	Pervez Malik	Zeba, Waheed Murad, Nirala, Bibbo	Sohail Rana	Film Arts
1966	Dard-e-Dil (Urdu)	N.K. Zubairi	Zeba, Trannum, Bibbo, Talat Siddiqui, Rozina Qureshi, Azad, Nazar, Kemal, Sultan Rahi	Khalil Ahmad	S.M. Farid
1969	Buzdil (Urdu)	Saqlain Rizvi	Deeba, Ejaz Durrani, Sabira Sultana, Bibbo, Habib-ur-Rehman	Khalil Ahmad	Abdul Baqi, Habib

== Awards and recognition ==
Year	Award	Category	Result	Title	Ref.
1958	Nigar Award	Best Actress	Won	Zehr-e-Ishq	
