= Hum Tum Aur Woh (1938 film) =

- Directed by: Mehboob Khan
- Written by: Wajahat Mirza
- Produced by: Sagar Movietone
- Starring: Motilal; Maya Banerjee; Rose; Yakub
- Cinematography: Faredoon Irani
- Music by: Anil Biswas
- Production company: Sagar Movietone
- Release date: 1938
- Running time: 157 min
- Country: India
- Language: Hindi

Hum Tum Aur Woh (Me, you and them) is a 1938 Hindi/Urdu social drama film. The film was directed by Mehboob Khan for Sagar Movietone. The music was composed by Anil Biswas with lyrics by Wajahat Mirza and Zia Sarhadi. The cinematographer was Faredoon Irani. The film starred Motilal, Maya Banerjee, Rose, Yakub and Sankatha Prasad. The film was a romantic triangle involving Moti (Motilal), Bina (Maya Bannerjee) the girl he's engaged to and Leela (Rose) who is obsessed with him.

== Plot ==
Moti (Motilal) is engaged to Bina (Maya Banerjee), but gets involved with Leela (Rose), who is passionate about him. She declares her love for Moti without guilt and goes on to have his child out of wedlock. Her traumatised father suggests that she commit suicide to avoid shame and harassment from society. Bina decides to break off her engagement with Moti in order for him to marry Leela. But Moti goes after Bina and is told by her father that Bina is dead. Leela makes the final sacrifice, letting Moti go to Bina.

== Cast ==
- Motilal as Moti
- Maya as Bina
- Rose Musleah as Leela
- Yakub
- Sankatha Prasad as Bina's father
- Pande as Leela's father
- Sunalini Devi
- Bhudo Advani

== Songs ==
#	Title	Singer
1	"Aaya Tha Main Prem Mandir Mein"	Tara Harish
2	"Hame Preet Kisi Se Nahin Karni"	Maya Banerjee, Harish
3	"More Sajna Naadan Prem Ko Paap Banaye"	
4	"Mufat Hue Badnam Sanwariya Tere Liye"	Zohrabai Ambalewali, Jaan
5	"Prem Ka Hai Sansar"	
6	"Sajna Hamare Paas Na Aaye"	Zohrabai Ambalewali
7	"Sajni Prem Ke Raag Suna Do Hame"	
8	"Sakhi Kehat Hai Man Dhadke"	
