= Sabita Devi =

Indian actress (1914–1998)

- Born: Iris Maude Gasper; 20 November 1914; Culcutta, British India
- Died: 31 December 1998 (aged 84); Silverwood Nursing Home, Beeston, Nottingham, England
- Resting place: Wilford crematorium West Bridgford, Nottingham
- Other name: Savita
- Occupation: Actress
- Years active: 1930–1947
- Spouse: David Trefor Lewis
- Children: 1 stepchild

Sabita Devi (born Iris Maude Gasper; 20 November 1914– 31 December 1998) was a Hindi film actress in Indian cinema. She is stated to be one of the "prominent" leading ladies of the "pioneering era" of Indian cinema along with Mehtab, Bibbo, Durga Khote, Gohar, Devika Rani and Seeta Devi. A Jewish by birth, she changed her name to find acceptability in Hindi cinema like the other Anglo-Indian and Jewish actresses of her time, Sulochana (Ruby Myers), Seeta Devi (Renee Smith), Madhuri (Beryl Claessen), and Manorama (Erin Daniels). After initially working with British Dominion Films Ltd., Calcutta, she shifted to Bombay and performed mainly in films produced by Sagar Movietone with her co-star in most films being Motilal. Some of the popular films with Motilal were Dr. Madhurika (1935) and Kulvadhu (1937) directed by Sarvottam Badami. Their first film together was Shaher Ka Jadoo (1934), which was also Motilal's debut film, and then Lagna Bandhan (1936) both directed by Kaliprasad Ghosh. She acted in Silver King (1935) with Motilal. It was an action film directed by C. M. Luhar, which became a "huge success".

Counted as one of the top three female artistes of her time, in 1938 she was the third highest paid actress after Sulochana (Ruby Myers) and Gohar, drawing a salary of Rs. 3000 per month. "Classic writers like K. M. Munshi and Ramanlal Vasantlal" were commissioned to write stories for her films, with elaborate sets and "special rehearsals" provided along with an overwhelming "pre-release publicity". One of the top directors of the time she worked with doing social genre films was Sarvottam Badami. She formed her own production company, Sudama Pictures, in collaboration with Sarvottam Badami along with the assistance of Ranjit Studios. From 1935–1943 Sabita acted in fifteen films, all directed by Badami. Some of the comedy films she acted in like Aap Ki Marzi (1939) and Ladies Only (1939), turned out to be big box office successes.

== Early life and family ==
Sabita Devi was born Iris Gasper in 1914 in Calcutta, British India into a Jewish family. Her father Percy Osborne Gasper, died in November 1938, in Bombay. Her mother remained as her manager-cum-companion. Sabita had two siblings, a brother and a sister.

== Career ==
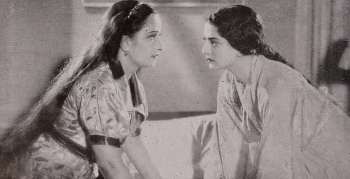
Bibbo and Sabita Devi in Ladies Only

=== 1930s ===
==== Early years and breakthrough ====
Her first film Kamaner Aagun (Flames Of The Flesh) was produced by British Dominion Films Ltd., Calcutta, in 1930. It was directed by Dinesh Ranjan Das and co-starred Dhirendranath Ganguly, Debaki Bose, Ramola Devi and Radharani. The film was a semi-historical version of the Queen of Chittor, Rani Padmini, committing jauhar to evade the enemy forces.

In 1931, Sabita acted in Aparadhi (The Culprit) a social, written and directed by Debaki Bose, starring P. C. Barua, Bhanu Bannerjee, Tincory Chakrabarty, Keshav Narayan Kale, Rampyari and Rose. It was a silent film made under the banner of Barua Film Unit, Calcutta. Her other silent films from this time include Takay Ki Na Hay (What Money Cannot Do) (1931) was directed by Dhirendranath Ganguly and produced by British Dominion Films Ltd., Calcutta. It starred Dhirendranath Ganguly, P. C. Barua and Radharani. Kanthahaar (Diamond Necklace) (1939) was directed by Kali Prasad Ghose for Indian Kinema Arts, Calcutta and starred Durgadas Bannerjee, Rajhans and Renubala. Maraner Pare (After The Death) (1931) directed by A. K. Roy for British Dominion Films Ltd., Calcutta and co-starred Dhirendranath Ganguly, Hem Gupta, Radharani and Kalidas. Bhagya Lakshmi (Wife's Destiny) (1932) directed by Kali Prasad Ghose with co-stars P. C. Barua, Durgadas Bannerjee, Khitish Roy Choudhary, Umasashi, Biren Ghosh and produced by Indian Kinema Arts, Calcutta.

In 1933, she was cast in a religious film, Radha Krishna, directed by Priyanath N. Ganguly and Tulsi Lahiri. Her co-stars were Dhiraj Bhattacharya, Indubala, Amar Choudhary and Kamala Jharia. An East India Film Company production, it had music by Sunderdas Bhatia.

==== Peak success (1934–1943) ====
Shaher Ka Jadoo in 1934 was a debut acting film for Motilal and was written and directed by Kali Prasad Ghose. The main stars in this social were Sabita, Kumar, Sitara Devi, K. C. Dey, Miss Gulzar and Tarabai. The film was produced by Sagar Movietone. She then acted in Ezra Mir's Farzande Hind also called Phantom of the Hills, an action drama film. The film starred Sabita with Jal Merchant, Yakub, Nyampally. Produced by Sagar, the music was composed by S. P. Rane.

Grihalakshmi (Educated Wife) (1934) was an early woman-centric film and was a remake of the earlier silent film Bhaneli Bhamini (1927). Directed by Sarvottam Badami, it was produced by Sagar and had music by S. P. Rane. Her co-stars were Jal Merchant, Yakub, K. C. Dey and Lalita Devulkar. Her last film in 1934 was Chandra Gupta directed by A. R. Kardar and starring Gul Hamid, Nazir, Mazhar Khan and Dhiraj Bhattacharya. Produced by East India Film Company, it had music by K. C. Dey.

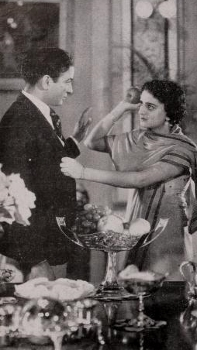
Motilal and Sabita Devi in Teen Sau Din Ke Baad (1938)

From 1935-1943 she acted in over fifteen films, all directed by Sarvottam Badami, with the exception of Silver King, cited as one of the best stunt films of its time. It was directed by C. M. Luhar and starred Motilal with music by Pransukh Nayak. Badami and Sabita left Sagar Movietone to form Sudama Pictures in association with Ranjit Pictures.

In 1935, Sabita acted in Badami's film, based on K. M. Munshi's story, Vengeance Is Mine (Ver Nu Vasulat). It co-starred Kumar, Yakub, Sitara Devi, and Mehboob Khan in a small role. Music director was S. P. Rane. In Dr. Madhurika she played an emancipated doctor opposite Motilal, with music by Pransukh Nayak and Ashok Ghosh. Some of the other successful films in the 1930s include Grama Kanya (1936), Kokila (1937) written by Ramanlal Vasantlal Desai, Kulvadhu (1937), Teen Sau Din Ke Baad also called 300 Days & After (1939) a modern romantic drama in which Sabita's acting received a positive critique from Baburao Patel as an "artiste of great calibre", in a "light-hearted a portrayal of her difficult role" and that "she easily takes away all the laurels for acting". Ladies Only was a 1939 comedy film directed by Badami and starred Bibbo, Prabha Devi and Sabita playing three girls from different states of India, all in love with the hero played by Surendra. This was the last comedy film Badami made for Sagar Movietone, before he left them after this film to form Sudama Pictures.

Sabita acted in the next comedy film directed by Badami, this time for Sudama pictures. Aap Ki Marzi (1939) was based on the MGM produced, Edward Buzzell directed film Paradise for Three (1938). The music direction was by Gyan Dutt and starred Motilal as the crossword puzzle winner who falls in love with Sabita's character.

=== 1940s ===
==== Production and entrepreneurship ====
Sajani (1940) was one of the first "socially relevant film(s)" that Badami made for Sudama pictures. It starred Sabita with Prithviraj Kapoor and Snehprabha Pradhan. Chingari (1940) a romantic melodrama from Sudama Productions with director Sarvottam Badami and co-starred Prithviraj Kapoor. The film was highly recommended by Baburao Patel editor of Filmindia as a contender for 1940 Award of the Film Journalists' Association Of India.

Bambai Ki Sair also called Holiday in Bombay (1941) was directed by Badami for Sudama Productions and co-starred Shobhana Samarth and Arun. The film was reportedly "creating new box-office records at the Imperial Cinema when it was released".

In 1947, she starred in Sarai Ke Bahar also known as Inquilab which is stated to be the only film directed by the famous Urdu writer Krishan Chander. It had lyrics by Niaz Haider and Vishwamitter Adil, with music by D. C. Dutt.

== Personal life ==
In 1951, she married chemist David Trefor Lewis in Bombay and moved to the United Kingdom, where she spent the remainder of her life. She adopted david's son from his previous marriage.

== Death ==
Sabita Devi died on 31 December 1998 in Beeston, Nottingham, England. She was cremated on 6 January 1999.

== Influence ==
- She's stated to have influenced P. C. Barua, who had joined the Board Of the British Dominion Film Company and acted in a few silent films, to start his own company. According to Chatterji, "He was inspired to become independent". After his return to Calcutta from Paris, Barua set up the Barua Film Unit. The first film under this banner was Aparadhi (1931), directed by Debaki Bose, with Sabita cast as the heroine. The film went on to become a "critical success".
- She was one of the earliest female artists to write about film acting as a decent profession for ladies from respectable families. In a letter to the Filmland English weekly, November 1931 issue, titled "Why Shouldn't Respectable Ladies Join the Films", she countered claims of immorality and low moral standards of producers and directors, raised by an anonymous actress in the September 1931 issue, "Should Respectable Ladies Join Films". She stated that "the attitude a man takes towards a woman is governed by the latter's own integrity, by her actions, words and manner". She went on to state that people had a "mid-victorian conception" of women on stage and that "A Lady Artiste" was perhaps herself to blame for any unwanted advances (author).

== Filmography ==
List:

Year	Film	Director	Cast	Studio/Producer
1930	Kamonar Agun (Flames Of The Flesh)	Dhirendranath Ganguly	Dhirendranath Ganguly, Debaki Bose, Radharani	Silent film. British Dominion Films Ltd
1931	Aparadhi (The Culprit)	Debaki Bose	P. C. Barua, Bhanu Bannerjee, Tincory Chakrabarty, Keshav Narayan Kale, Rampyari, Rose	Silent Film. Barua Film Unit Calcutta
1931	Takay Ki Na Hay (What Money Cannot Do)	Dhirendranath Ganguly	Dhirendranath Ganguly, P. C. Barua, Radharani	Silent Film. British Dominion Films Ltd., Calcutta.
1931	Kanthahaar (Diamond Necklace)	Kali Prasad Ghose	Durgadas Bannerjee, Rajhans, Renubala	Silent Film. Indian Kinema Arts, Calcutta
1931	Maraner Pare (After The Death)	A. K. Roy	Dhirendranath Ganguly, Hem Gupta, Radharani, Kalidas	Silent Film. British Dominion Films Ltd., Calcutta
1932	Bhagya Lakshmi (Wife's Destiny)	Kali Prasad Ghose	P. C. Barua, Durgadas Bannerjee, Khitish Roy Choudhary, Umasashi, Biren Ghosh	Silent Film. Indian Kinema Arts, Calcutta
1933	Radha Krishna	Priyanath N. Ganguly, Tulsi Lahiri	Dhiraj Bhattacharya, Sabita Devi, Amar Choudhary, Kamala Jharia	East India Film Co
1934	Shehar Ka Jadoo (Lure Of The City)	Kali Prasad Ghosh	Kumar, Sitara Devi, K. C. Dey, Miss Gulzar, Tarabai	Sagar Movietone
1934	Farzande Hind (Phantom Of The Hills)	Ezra Mir	Jal Merchant, Nyanpalli, Motilal, Yakub	Sagar Movetone
1934	Grihalakshmi (Educated Wife)	Sarvottam Badami	Jal Merchant, Yakub, K. C. Dey, Lalita Devulkar	Sagar Movetone
1934	Chandra Gupta	A. R. Kardar	Gul Hamid, Nazir, Mazhar Khan, Dhiraj Bhattacharya	East India Film Company
1935	Vengeance Is Mine (Ver Nu Vasulat)	Sarvottam Badami	Kumar, Yakub, Sitara Devi, Mehboob Khan	Sagar
1935	Dr. Madhurika	Sarvottam Badami	Motilal, Padma, Gulzar, Bhudo Advani	Sagar Movietone
1936	Lagna Bandhan	Kali Prasad Ghose	Motilal, Aruna Devi, Azurie	Sagar Movietone
1936	Jeevan Lata (The Creeper Of Life)	Sarvottam Badami	Motilal, Sankatha Prasad, Bhudo Advani	Sagar Movietone
1936	Grama Kanya (Village Girl)	Sarvottam Badami	Surendra, Yakub, Kayam Ali, Aruna Devi	Sagar Movietone
1937	Kokila	Sarvottam Badami	Shobhana Samarth, Motilal, Sitara Devi, Maya Bannerji	Sagar Movietone
1937	Kulvadhu	Sarvottam Badami	Motilal, Gulzar, Pesi Patel	Sagar Movietone
1938	Teen Sau Din Ke Baad (Three Hundred Days & After)	Sarvottam Badami	Motilal, Bibbo, Yakub, Gulzar, Sankatha Prasad	Sagar Movietone
1939	Ladies Only	Sarvottam Badami	Surendra, Bibbo, Prabha Devi, Bhudo Advani	Sagar Movietone
1939	Aap Ki Marzi (As You Please)	Sarvottam Badami	Motilal, Mazhar Khan, Vasanti, Khurshid, K. N. Singh	Sudama Productions
1940	Chingari (Embers)	Sarvottam Badami	Prithviraj Kapoor, E. Billimoria, Keshavrao Date, Meera	Sudama Productions
1940	Sajani	Sarvottam Badami	Prithviraj Kapoor, Snehprabha Pradhan, Nurjehan, Dixit, Ghory	Sudama Productions
1941	Bambai Ki Sair (Holiday In Bombay)	Sarvottam Badami	Shobhana Samarth, Arun, E. Billimoria, Vatsala Kumthekar	Sudama Productions
1943	Prarthana (The Prayer)	Sarvottam Badami	Motilal, Jehanara Kajjan, K. N. Singh	Minerva Movietone
1943	Fashion	S. F. Hasnain	Sardar Akhtar, Chandra Mohan, Bhudo Advani	Fazli Brothers
1945	Amrapali	Nandlal Jaswantlal	Prem Adib, Arun, Jeevan	Murli Movies
1947	Sarai Ke Bahar	Krishan Chander	Hemavati, Tabrez, Hasan, Cuckoo	N. Studio Ltd.
