= Rose Musleah =

- Born: January 1, 1911; Kolkata, British India
- Died: December 8, 1985 (aged 74); Los Angeles, California

Rose Musleah (also known as Miss Rose; born: January 1, 1911 Calcutta, India - died: December 8, 1985, California, United States) was an Indian theater and film actress of Jewish origin who acted in Bollywood and Tollywood. She acted in silent films at first and later in talkies. Remembered as the "dancer actress" of silent cinema. Her films dealt with conflicts between tradition and individual choice. Her only known film to have survived is Nai Kahani (1943).

== Biography ==
Rose Musleah was born in 1911 in Calcutta (now Kolkata) in British India, the only child of a Jewish family of Baghdadi origin. Her father was the secretary of the Costa Rican consul in India. Rose had two cousins who were also actresses: Pramila (Esther Victoria Abraham) and Ramula (Sophie Abraham).

Musleah dreamed of studying medicine, but her wealthy parents prevented her from doing so. Upon finishing her studies at the age of 15, which she graduated with honors, Mosley became a personal secretary, and taught ballroom dancing in the evenings. Because of her attractive appearance, friends suggested she start acting and she started acting on the stages, for Agha Ashhar.

Musleah spoke only English and French, not Hindi or Bengali. She had to learn these two languages from the beginning. After studying and gaining acting experience in the theater, she applied with a letter of recommendation to JF Madan and started working in Tollywood films. Her first film was in 1922 directed by Madan and she acted in other films for him.

In 1927 at the age of 16 she got married and later went through divorce and financial difficulties before becoming a star of the silent films in the twenties. In 1935 she moved to Bombay and joined Imperial's first studios.

She co-starred with her cousin Pramila In the 1936 film Hamari Betiyan (Our Darling Daughters), .

In the movies she liked to play the role of a country girl, although she mostly played a rich character. She co-starred with actors Motilal in Hum Tum Aur Woh in 1938 and Prithviraj Kapoor in Adhuri Kahani in 1939. She was known for her dancing and singing talent in films, as well as the colorful dresses and luxurious sarees she used to wear in films and in life.

A back injury from which she never recovered, ended her acting career.

== Personal life ==
At the age of 16 she got married, changed her name to that of her husband and became Rose Ezra. The couple had two daughters Marjorie and Cynthia.

She later divorced and returned to her original name Rose Musleah. After stopping her acting career, she remarried and moved to the United States.

Musleah died in Los Angeles, California, United States in 1985.

In an interview she had in 1941, she said that she still loved to dance and taught her two daughters to dance and that her favorite author was Somerset Maugham.

Rose Musleah's granddaughter, Rachel Reuben Cohen, became a film editor.

== Filmography ==
- Pati Bakhti - 1922
- Aparadhi - 1931
- Balika Badhu - 1931- as Lajya
- Turki Sher’ - 1933
- Aladdin aur jaadui chirag - 1933
- Hamari Betiyan - 1936 - as Radha
- Mr. X. - 1938
- Hum Tum Aur Woh - 1938 - as Leela
- Adhuri Kahani - 1939 - as Neelam
- Mala - 1941
- Nayi Kahaani - 1943
- Ramayani - 1945
