= Ladies Only =

Ladies Only may refer to:

- "Ladies Only", notice indicating section of UK railway train reserved for women
- Ladies Only (1939 film), an Indian Hindi-language social comedy film
- Ladies Only, the Malayalam dubbed version of Magalir Mattum (1994), later remade as Ladies Only in Hindi
- Advocate Lakshmanan – Ladies Only, a 2010 Indian Malayalam-language film

== See also ==
- Magalir Mattum (disambiguation)
