= Jeevan Lata =

- Directed by: Sarvottam Badami
- Written by: Waqif
- Produced by: Sagar Movietone
- Starring: Sabita Devi; Motilal; Gulzar; Bhudo Advani
- Cinematography: Faredoon Irani
- Music by: Pransukh Nayak
- Production company: Sagar Movietone
- Release date: 1936
- Running time: 174 minutes
- Country: India
- Language: Hindi

Jeevan Lata (transl. The Creeper of Life) is a 1936 Hindi social drama film directed by Sarvottam Badami. The film was produced by Sagar Movietone and had music by Pransukh M. Nayak. Sabita Devi and Motilal paired in several films right from Motilal's first Shaher Ka Jadoo (1934), with Badami using the pair for many of the films he directed for Sagar Movietone. This was Motilal's fourth film. The film starred Sabita Devi, Motilal, Gulzar, Sankatha Prasad, Bhudo Advani and Mehdi Raza.

== Cast ==
- Motilal
- Sabita Devi
- Bhudo Advani
- Sushila
- Pande
- Sankatha
- Mehdi Raja

== Music ==
The music was composed by Pransukh Nayak.

=== Soundtrack ===
#	Title	Singer
1	"Mero Dil Chheen Liyo Re"	Sabita Devi
2	"Mohe Prem Ke Jhoole"	Sabita Devi
3	"Prem Ki Raah Mein Chalna Koi Aasan Nahin"	Sabita Devi
4	"Shabe Vasal Dulhan Bani"	Sabita Devi
5	"Param Prem Paribrahm Jagat Mein"	Sabita Devi
