= Chingari =

Chingari may refer to:

- Chingari (1940 film), an Indian film
- Chingari (1964 film), a Pakistani Urdu-language film
- Chingari (1971 film), a Bollywood film
- Chingari (2012 film), an Indian Kannada-language film
