= Adhuri Kahani =

- Directed by: Chaturbuj Doshi
- Starring: Durga Khote, Prithviraj Kapoor
- Music by: Jnan Dutt
- Release date: 1939
- Country: India
- Language: Hindi

Adhuri Kahani (The Unfinished Tale) is an Indian film directed by Chaturbuj Doshi released in 1939. The cast includes Durga Khote, Prithviraj Kapoor, Rose, Keshavrao Date, Ila Devi, Ishwarlal, Meerabai, Yakub, Khatoon, Mirza Musharraf, T. Zaidi. The film also had Meena Kumari as a child artist, Kumari was not rechristened as a baby meena then.

== Plot ==
The educated and liberal Harbala (Khote) is oppressed by her conservative husband Seth Gopaldas (Date). Determined that her children Somnath (Kapoor) and Neelam (Rose) shall lead freer lives, she is frustrated by Gopaldas' authoritarian traditionalism and commits suicide. Neelam and Somanth, haunted by guilt, join her in death. The film leaves open the possibility that in the future a less oppressive society will be achieved: literally translated, the title means 'The Unfinished Tale'.

== Cast ==
- Keshavrao Date as Seth Gopaldas
- Durga Khote as Harbala
- Rose Musleah as Neelam
- Prithviraj Kapoor as Somnath
- Mirza Musharraf
- Ishwarlal
- Ila Devi
- Yakub
- Meerabai
- Baby Mahjabeen
- T. Zaidi

== Songs ==
Music is by Jnan Dutt. The film featured eleven songs.

1. "Aao Laalan Aao Ma Ki Godi Aao"
2. "Bhai Mori Laaj Bairan Bhai Aaj Piya Pardes Sidhaare"
3. "Chaandni Khili Hui Mast Fiza Mein Mand Mahak Hai"
4. "Chhal Bal Kar Ke Chitwan Bhar Ke"
5. "Jeevan Ki Daali Pe Do Panchhi"
6. "Jhoom Rahi Daal Daal Jhool Rahe Patte"
7. "Maiya Soona Mandir Tera Dhoop Nahin Hai"
8. "Meri Chatak Matak Ki Chundri"
9. "Sajeela Chhabila Chhaila"
10. "Shubha Ghadi Sahab Ghar Aaye Jee"
11. "So Ja Lalna So Ja Maa Ki Godi Hai Ghar Tera"
