= Teen Sau Din Ke Baad =

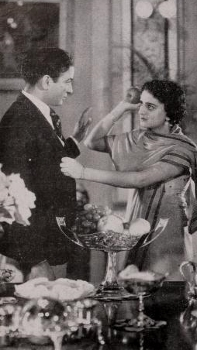
- Motilal and Sabita Devi in Teen Sau Din Ke Baad
- Directed by: Sarvottam Badami
- Written by: Babubhai A. Mehta
- Produced by: Sagar Movietone
- Starring: Sabita Devi; Motilal; Bibbo; Yakub
- Cinematography: Faredoon Irani
- Music by: Pransukh Nayak
- Production company: Sagar Movietone
- Release date: 1938
- Running time: 158 min
- Country: India
- Language: Hindi

Teen Sau Din Ke Baad (transl. 300 Days Later) is a 1938 Indian social comedy film directed by Sarvottam Badami. The film was produced by Sagar Movietone, with story written by Babubhai A. Mehta and dialogue by Wajahat Mirza and Waqif. The music was composed by Anil Biswas with lyrics by Zia Sarhadi. The director of photography was Faredoon Irani and the film starred Bibbo, Motilal, Sabita Devi, Yakub, Pesi Patel and Gulzar. The film had Motilal playing the role of "a young bored millionaire", who due to his intemperate life-style starts falling ill. He bets with his doctor that he can go out in the world and manage to exist without his wealth.

This was Badami's first comedy film and it was a success at the box-office; he went on to direct two more comedies after this, Aap Ki Marzi (1939) and Ladies Only (1939), also successes.

== Plot ==
Sudhir (Motilal), a young millionaire is leading a dissipated life indulging in drinks, gambling and women due to sheer boredom. His health starts fading and after one such bout he faints. The doctor admonishes him regarding his life-style. He advises him against his fast life and suggests that he take to some physical labour, which the doctor is sure Sudhir will not be able to do. Sudhir takes up the challenge and decides to give up his home for three hundred days and live without using his wealth. He sets out into the world with nothing in his pocket. The challenges he faces and how he overcomes them are interspersed with a lot of humour and hard work as he tries to make a living. He finally ends up working in a soap factory where he falls in love with the typist Sharda (Sabita Devi). The boss Lakshmidas has a wife Ramola (Bibbo), who is attracted to Sudhir. When the boss faces problems with the factory, Sudhir anonymously sends money to help him out. Eventually the three hundred days are over, Sudhir now a healthy young man has won his bet with the doctor and a wife for himself.

== Cast ==
- Sabita Devi as Sharda
- Motilal as Sudhir
- Bibbo
- Yakub
- Sankatha Prasad
- Pesi Patel
- Pande
- Gulzar
- Yusuf
- Waskar
- Rukmini
- Piroj Wadkar

== Music ==
The music was composed by Anil Biswas and had lyrics written by Zia Sarhadi. Songs like "Ghar Apna Yeh Kursi Apni" and "Ik Tum Na Hui Toh Kya Hua" became extremely popular. There were nine songs in the film and the singers were Bibbo, Sabita Devi and Motilal.

=== Song list ===
#	Title	Singer
1	"Mat Neer Bahaa Chup Ho Jaa"	Bibbo
2	"Sundar Hoon Sakhi"	Bibbo
3	"Arrey Akeli Mat Jaiye Jamuna Ke Teer"	Bibbo
4	"Ek Tum Na Hui Toh Kya Hua"	Motilal
5	"Hun Sabko Sabse Jyada Khush Banaata Hai"	Chorus
6	"Koi Geet Manohar Nyaara Nit Gaaye"	Bibbo
7	"Mad Ki Bud Peeli Peeli"	Motilal
8	"Sundar Hoon Sakhi"	Bibbo
9	"Mangal Aarti Priya Pritam Ki"	Chorus
