= Kokila (1937 film) =

- Directed by: Sarvottam Badami
- Written by: Ramanlal Vasantlal Desai
- Produced by: Sagar Movietone
- Starring: Motilal; Sabita Devi; Shobhna Samarth; Maya Bannerjee
- Cinematography: Faredoon Irani
- Music by: Anil Biswas
- Production company: Sagar Movietone
- Distributed by: Supreme Film Distributors, Bombay
- Release date: 30 October 1937
- Country: India
- Language: Hindi

Kokila (transl. Nightingale) is a 1937 Hindi social family drama film directed by Sarvottam Badami. The music was composed by Anil Biswas with lyrics written by Siddiqui and Zia Sarhadi. The story was adapted from the well-known novel Kokila, written by Gujarati writer Ramanlal Vasantlal Desai. The film starred Motilal, Sabita Devi, Shobhna Samarth, Maya Bannerjee, Sitara Devi, Pesi Patel, Siddiqui and Kayam Ali.

== Cast ==
- Motilal
- Sabita Devi
- Shobhna Samarth
- Sitara Devi
- Sankata Prasad
- Maya Bannerjee
- Pesi Patel
- Kayam Ali
- Siddiqui

== Review and Box Office ==
The film was not a success with Baburao Patel of Filmindia in his December 1937 editorial claiming it had "failed rather badly". However, it had a large audience attendance in the first week and that according to Patel was due to Sabita Devi. The screenplay was considered a poor adaptation of the story. Patel was critical of Motilal and Siddiqui's performances while praising Maya Bannerjee and Sankatha Prasad for their efforts. Shobhna Samarth had made her entry in films through Nigah-e-Nafrat (1935), but came into prominence with her roles in films like Do Diwane (1936) and Kokila.

== Music ==
The music was composed by Anil Biswas with lyrics by Siddiqui and Zia Sarhadi The singers were Sabita Devi, Maya Bannerjee, Anil Biswas and Dattaram Kadam.

=== Song list ===
#	Title	Singer
1	"Auron Ka Jag Kya Hai"	Dattaram Kadam
2	"Din Ki Ghadiyan Roye Bitai"	Anil Baswas
3	"Sajan Ke Waste Main Bhon Le Jaoongi"	Dattaram Kadam
4	"Sagar Gaaye parvat Gaaye, Gaaye Koyal Ban Ki"	Anil Biswas
5	"Nainan Ke Sain Se Bulayi Ho Shyam Mohe"	Dattaram Kadam
6	"Mohe Ghar Ke Dwar Pe Laaga Jaamuniya Ka Ped"	Anil Biswas
7	"Jeevan Mein Sikh Paaya Humne"	Dattaram Kadam
