= Harishchandra (1932 film) =

1932 film

- Directed by: Sarvottam Badami
- Produced by: Sagar Movietone
- Starring: Nungambakkam Janaki; Rukmini
- Production company: Sagar Movietone
- Release date: 1932
- Country: India
- Language: Tamil

Harishchandra is a 1932 Tamil mythological film directed by Raja Chandrasekhar and Sarvottam Badami for Sagar Movietone. T.C. Vadivelu Naicker is another name cited as an earlier co-director. The film was the third Tamil talkie produced. The first Tamil talkie was Kalidas (1931), produced by Imperial Movietone and directed by H. M. Reddy. The second Tamil sound film was Galava Rishi, produced by Sagar Movietone and directed by Sarvottam Badami. The cast included Nungambakkam Janaki and Rukmini.

The film was inspired by the first Indian film Raja Harishchandra, and involved the story of the legendary King Harishchandra, who in the process of sticking to his principles of honesty and keeping his vows made, suffers through loss of kingdom, family, and penury.

== Plot ==
Raja Harishchandra is approached by the sage Vishwamitra and asked to fulfil a vow he made the latter in his dream of bequeathing his entire kingdom to him. The Raja does so and prepares to leave the kingdom with his wife Taramati, and son Rohtas. Vishwamitra further claims that the king owes him another boon and in order to pay, Harishchandra has to sell his wife and son as bonded labourers in a Brahmin's house. He works as a helper in the mortuary grounds. After several tribulations, the Gods are happy with Harishchandra's penances and they restore his kingdom and family, offering him a place in heaven.

== Production ==
According to Bhaskaran, Harishchandra was made in twenty-one days and hence important elements like continuity were lost in the rush of filming. The film was less than half completed when the original director who has been cited either as a German, or Naicker himself, ceased working on the film. Badami then a young man of nineteen years stepped in to complete the film. The finished product was well-appreciated by the audiences becoming a hit at the box-office.
