= Kulvadhu =

- Directed by: Sarvottam Badami
- Produced by: Sagar Movietone
- Starring: Motilal; Sabita Devi; Gulzar; Pesi Patel
- Music by: Pransukh Nayak
- Production company: Sagar Movietone
- Release date: 7 May 1937
- Country: India
- Language: Hindi

Kulvadhu (transl. Daughter-in-Law) is a 1937 Indian Hindi-language social family drama film directed by Sarvottam Badami. Made under the Sagar Movietone banner it had music by Pransukh M Nayak, and the film starred Motilal, Sabita Devi, Gulzar and Pesi Patel.

As a publicity gimmick, Badami asked for reviews written in Marathi, English, Hindi and Gujarati languages, offering cash prizes of Rs. 250, Rs. 150 and Rs. 100 for the best review. The ploy worked sending audiences to the theatre to see the film. Motilal's romantic role in the film was appreciated by the audiences.

== Cast ==
- Motilal
- Sabita Devi
- Gulzar
- Pesi Patel
- Pande
- Jamu Patel

== Music ==
The music was by Pransukh Nayak, with lyrics by Siddiqui.

=== Song list ===
#	Title
1	"Aao Meri Guyian Hilmil Gaave"
2	"Aao Videsh Chalo Ab Baalam Ghar Se Mora Ji Ghabraaye"
3	"Aayi Aayi Bahar Layi Phoolon Ka Haar"
4	"Arre O Karelewali Chham Chham Idhar Toh Aana"
5	"Main Girdhar Ke Ghar Jaaoon"
6	"Shri Girdhar Aage Nachoongi"
7	"Tera Koi Nahin Rokanhaar Magan Hoye Mira Chali"
