= Magalir Mattum =

Magalir Mattum (lit. 'Women Only') may refer to:

- Magalir Mattum (1994 film), Indian Tamil-language film by Singeetam Srinivasa Rao
- Magalir Mattum (2017 film), Indian Tamil-language film by Bramma

== See also ==
- Ladies Only (disambiguation)
