= Aap Ki Marzi =

- Directed by: Sarvottam Badami
- Produced by: Sudama Productions
- Starring: Motilal; Sabita Devi; Khursheed; K. N. Singh
- Music by: Gyan Dutt
- Production company: Sudama Productions
- Release date: 1939
- Country: India
- Language: Hindi

Aap Ki Marzi (transl. As You Please) is 1939 Hindi romantic comedy film directed by Sarvottam Badami. The film was produced under the Sudama Productions banner. The music composer was Gyan Dutt with lyrics credited to Pyare Lal Santoshi and S. P. Kalla. It starred Motilal, Sabita Devi, Khursheed, K. N. Singh, Mazhar Khan, Vasanti and Sunalini Devi. This was director Badami's second comedy film; he had earlier directed the comedy Teen Sau Din Ke Baad (1938) which turned out be a box office success. Aap Ki Marzi was based on the MGM produced, Edward Buzzell directed film Paradise for Three (1938), itself adapted from Erich Kästner's novel Three Men in the Snow.

The film is the story of an unemployed youth played by Motilal who wins the first prize in a crossword puzzle and the romantic-comic situations that arise thereafter.

== Plot ==
Seth Bansilal (Mazhar Khan) posing as an ordinary man Govindlal, takes part in a crossword puzzle competition; he wins the second-prize trip to Kashmir. The first prize is won by an unemployed youth, Sumant (Motilal). Bansilal, accompanied by his niece Shashi (Sabita Devi), lands up at a hotel in Kashmir at the same time as Sumant. Due to some misunderstanding Sumant gets the room Bansilal's wife (Sunalini Devi) has booked for him. Bansilal opts to stay in a common cheaper room as Govindlal. Several comic situations follow along with Sumant and Shashi falling in love and Sumant getting black-mailed by a girl in the hotel, Manjri (Khursheed). The misunderstandings are finally cleared with the lovers getting united.

== Cast ==
- Motilal as Sumant
- Sabita Devi as Shashi
- Khursheed as Manjri
- Mazhar Khan as Sir Bansilal/Govindlal,
- K. N. Singh
- Jagdish Sethi
- Sunalini Devi

== Music ==
The music direction was by Gyan Dutt and the lyricists were Pyare Lal Santoshi and S. P. Kalla. The songs were sung by Khursheed, Gyan Dutt and Vasanti.

=== Song list ===
#	Title	Singer	Lyricist
1	"Aaj Mere Ghar Mehmaan Aaye"	Khursheed	es:Pyarelal Santoshi (1916-1978)
2	"Bhanwara Rasiya Re Man Basiya"	Khursheed	P. L. Santoshi
3	"Akash Se Laayi Tod Ke Taare"	Sabita Devi	S. P. Kalla
4	"Chal Dheere Dheere Chal Dheere Dheere"	Vasanti	P. L. Santoshi
5	"Bataoongi Bataoongi Main Tumhe Bataoongi"	Vasanti	P. L. Santoshi
6	"Gowve Chara Ke Banke Bihari"	Khursheed, Gyan Dutt	P. L. Santoshi
7	"Jaa Na Sakoge Bahan Chhudake"	Khursheed	P. L. Santoshi
8	"Kaun Batlaaye Kya Hai Raze Zindagi"	Gyan Dutt	S. P. Kalla
9	"Maano Na Naano Aap Ki Marzi"	Vasanti	S. P. Kalla
10	"Prem Lata Lipti Jaye"	Sabita Devi, Gyan Gutt	S. P. Kalla
11	"Roothi Ladki Kaun Manaye"		S. P. Kalla
