= Pyaase Nain =

Pyaase Main
- Starring: Anwari (actress); Rehman; Shyama
- Music by: Bilious C. Rani
- Release date: 1954

Pyaase Nain is a 1954 Hindi film starring Rehman.

== Soundtrack ==
#	Title	Singer
1	"Mere Jeevan Me Aaya Hai Kaun"	Asha Bhosle, Talat Mahmood
2	"Pyase Naino Ki Pyas Bujha De"	Lata Mangeshkar
3	"Ek Chand Banane Wale Ne Sau Chand"	Asha Bhosle
4	"Jo Dil Pe Tere Yeh Tes Lagti"	Asha Bhosle
5	"Kanto Me Daman Ulajh Gaya"	Asha Bhosle, Bulo C. Rani
6	"Manva Tu Haule Haule Gaaye Ja Geet"	Asha Bhosle
7	"Mukh Se Kuch Na Bol Bawari"	Asha Bhosle
8	"Raat Suhani Aayi Dekho Chamke Nanhe"	Asha Bhosle
