= Ladies Only (1939 film) =

- Directed by: Sarvottam Badami
- Screenplay by: Zia Sarhadi
- Story by: Sarvottam Badami
- Produced by: Sagar Movietone
- Starring: Sabita Devi; Surendranath; Bibbo; Prabha
- Cinematography: Faredoon Irani A. Irani
- Edited by: Shamshudin Kadri
- Music by: Anupam Ghatak
- Production company: Sagar Movietone
- Distributed by: Kapurchand Limited
- Release date: 1939
- Running time: 158 min
- Country: India
- Language: Hindi

Ladies Only is a 1939 Indian Hindi-language social comedy film directed by Sarvottam Badami. Produced by Sagar Movietone, it had music by Anupam Ghatak and starred Surendranath, Sabita Devi, Bibbo and Prabha. This was the last comedy film made by Sarvottam Badami before he left Sagar Movietone. He joined his mentor Ambalal Patel, at Sudama Pictures to start making "socially relevant" films.

The story involved three girls from different region (States) meeting at a railway station, and their relationship with each other thereafter.

== Plot ==
Three girls from different regions of India, Sabita Devi (Gujarat), Bibbo (Punjab), and Prabha (Bengal) meet at a railway station. With no place to stay they decide to find accommodation together. A cook (Bhudo Advani) joins them speaking the language from each state. A young crook (Surendra) enters their life and trouble starts brewing between the girls when they all fall in love with him.

== Cast ==
Credits adapted from the films's pressbook:

- Sabita Devi as Sarojini
- Surendranath as Satish
- Bibbo as Asha
- Prabha as Chhaya
- Advani as Jayaram
- Harish as Harish
- Pande as Press Proprietor
- Krishnakumari as Mrs. Durgadas
- Gulzar as Indira
- Sunalini Devi as Headmistress
- Kaushalya as Indoo

== Music ==
Music was composed by Anupam Ghatak with lyrics by Zia Sarhadi and Pandit Indra Chandra.

=== Song list ===
#	Title
1	"Aaye Piharva Aaye Aaye"
2	"Ashram ashram Hum Banaye"
3	"Banayi Batiyan Mose Kahe Ko Jhoothi"
4	"Chamke Poonam Ko Poonam Ka Chand"
5	"Jaldi Pee Ko Paana Mushkil"
6	"Meri Sejon Ko Mehman Hai Nadan"
7	"Paniya Bharan Panghat Pe Gayi Main"
8	"Sagar Ke Marg Ghar Baithe Ganga Aayi"
9	"Soye Bin Dekhoon Sapna Yeh Haal Raat Din Apna"
10	"Tere Tirchhe Nishane Yahan Seedhe Lage"
