= Dr. Madhurika =

- Directed by: Sarvottam Badami
- Written by: K. M. Munshi
- Produced by: Sagar Movietone
- Starring: Sabita Devi; Motilal; Pesi Patel; Bhudo Advani
- Cinematography: Faredoon Irani
- Music by: Ashok Ghosh; Pransukh Nayak
- Production company: Sagar Movietone
- Release date: 1935
- Running time: 174 min
- Country: India
- Language: Hindi

Dr. Madhurika (Modern Wife) is a 1935 social film directed by Sarvottam Badami based on a story by K. M. Munshi. The cinematography was by Faredoon Irani and the film starred Sabita Devi, Motilal, Gulzar, Bhudo Advani and Padma Shaligram. The dialogue and lyrics were by Waqif with music by Pransukh Nayak and Ashok Ghosh.

Dr. Madhurika was written as a script by Munshi for Sagar Movietone and then converted into a drama in 1936. The movie was criticized for its regressive story. The film was later remade as Mr. & Mrs. '55 (1955). The female protagonist is a modern doctor who insists on continuing her practice after marriage and not wanting children. The story then follows her traditional change.

== Plot ==
Dr. Madhurika (Sabita Devi) is a "modern" young woman, committed to her career and believes in family planning. She marries Narendra (Motilal), but first makes him agree to not wanting children as a way of controlling population growth. She would also prefer that he not interfere in her work or stop her from meeting friends. She becomes friendly with one of her doctor colleagues, Dr Gaurish (Pesi Patel), but when she sees Narendra paying attention to Gaurish's wife her jealousy is aroused. She then turns into a typical boring housewife with no career.

== Cast ==
- Sabita Devi as Dr. Madhurika
- Motilal as Narendra
- Padma Shaligram as Indu
- Pesi Patel as Dr. Gaurish
- Gulzar
- Baby Indira
- Pande
- Bhudo Advani

== Music ==
The lyrics were written by Waqif with music composed by two music directors, Ashok Ghosh and Pransukh Nayak.

=== Song list ===
#	Title
1	"Bachche Hain Yeh Bhole Bhaale"
2	"Chalo Jaldi Kahin Chalkar Nai Nagariya Basayenge"
3	"Daman Jo Chhoo Liya Hai Kisi Gulzar Ka"
4	"Jaake Sar Par Sarjanhaar"
5	"Main Jiski Talash Mein Phirta Hoon"
6	"Mori Pyari Pyari Gaiya"
7	"Nain Unse Laage Rahe"
8	"Woh Swaamini Sohaay"
9	"Haay Paalish Ki Dibiya Khaali Hai"
