= Sajani (1940 film) =

- Directed by: Sarvottam Badami
- Produced by: Sudama Productions
- Starring: Prithviraj Kapoor; Snehlata Pradhan; Sabita Devi; Noor Jehan; Dixit
- Music by: Gyan Dutt
- Production company: Sudama Productions
- Release date: 1940
- Country: India
- Language: Hindi

Sajani is a 1940 Hindi social film directed by Sarvottam Badami for Sudama Productions. Scripted by Zia Sarhadi, the film had music by Gyan Dutt and starred Prithviraj Kapoor, Sabita Devi, Snehprabha Pradhan, Noor Jehan, Dixit, and Ghory. Badami left Sagar Movietone where he had made satirical comedies to join his "mentor" Ambalal Patel at Sudama Productions to make "socially relevant film(s)", where Sajani was one of the first. Snehprabha Pradhan acted in several films produced by Chimanbhai Desai in 1940, including Sajani.

== Cast ==
- Prithviraj Kapoor
- Sabita Devi
- Snehprabha Pradhan
- Noor Jehan
- Dixit
- Ghory
- Kesari
- Shakir
- Tarabai

== Music ==
The film's music was composed by Gyan Dutt with lyrics by Pyare Lal Santoshi, Pandit Indra Chandra and Zia Sarhadi. The singers were Brijmala, Gyan Dutt and Snehlata Pradhan.

=== Song list ===
#	Title	Singer	Lyricist
1	"Kheton Mein Milne Aaye Sajan Aur Sajni"	Brijmala	P. L. Santoshi
2	"Main Deepak Ki Bati Priyatam"	Snehprabha Pradhan	Santoshi
3	"Main Hun Khet Ki Rani Re"		Pandit Indra Chandra
4	"Meri Guyian Chali Ithlaye"	Snehprabha Pradhan	Santoshi
5	"Mora Piya Bas Kaiaun Desh Ho"		Zia Sarhadi
6	"Musafir Jaana Tujhko Dur Chala Ja"	Gyan Dutt	Santoshi
7	"Pahuncha De Babuji Ko Ae Yar"	Gyan Dutt	Santoshi
