= Sarvottam Badami =

Indian film director

- Born: Sarvottam L. Badami; 1 January 1910; Channapatna, Bangalore, Karnataka, India
- Died: 2005 (aged 95); Bangalore, Karnataka, India
- Occupation: Film director
- Years active: 1932–1952

Sarvottam Badami (1910–2005) was an Indian film director of Hindi, Telugu, and Tamil films. He started his career as a sound recordist for the first talkie in India, Alam Ara (1931). In 1948 he helped set up the Films Division, as the first state-owned film production and distribution unit, for newsreel and documentaries, where he worked as the chief producer in the newsreel department and also made documentaries. His active years were from 1932 to 1952 when he retired from the Films Division and from making feature films to settle in Bangalore.

== Early life ==
Badami was born in 1910 to a revenue officer working in Mysore. He passed his SSLC and worked as a garage mechanic and then a projectionist in Select Picture House, Bangalore, both of which were owned by Ambalal Patel. Patel moved to Bombay and financed Ardeshir Irani of Imperial Film Company, and Chimanlal Desai as a partner forming Sagar Movietone in 1930.

== Career ==
At the age of 19 years, Badami went to Bombay to study automobile engineering. He was asked by Ardeshir Irani who met him at a wedding to help out with the recording equipment he had purchased from abroad.

Badami helped in the sound recording department for the first Talkie in India, Ardeshir Irani's Alam Ara (1931). Around that time a German director making the film Harishchandra left half-way and Badami offered to complete it, although the Play director was T. C. Vadivelu Naicker. The film turned out to be successful. He was contracted by Sagar Movietone (Sagar Film Company) to direct three films, two in Telugu and one in Tamil: Galava Rishi (Tamil), Sri Rama Paduka Pattabhishekam and Sakunthala in Telugu. The success of these films established him as a director. His working team had people like the cinematographer Faredoon Irani, music director Anil Biswas and the Sagar Movietone favourites Sabita Devi and Motilal.

Initially, to avoid embarrassment to his family he requested not to be credited in the regional language films. He did not know Hindi but from 1932-1947, he worked for Sagar Movietone and directed nearly 30 films in Hindi. His first Hindi film was Chandrahasa (1933) starring Noor Mohammed Charlie. He was paid Rs 2000 per film with the complete film being made within Rs 50,000. He worked with most of the top actors of the time like Motilal, Nargis, Ashok Kumar and Pahari Sanyal. He brought Mehboob Khan who was then doing roles as an extra out of obscurity and gave him the role of Sabita Devi's father in the film Vengeance is Mine (1935).

He made several films based on novels. Some of the writers whose work he used were K. M. Munshi, Saratchandra, and Ramanlal Vasanthlal Desai. The film Aap Ki Marzi (1939) was inspired by Edward Buzzell’s Paradise for Three (1938). He became known for his satirical comedies and "socially relevant films". His film Grihalaxmi (1934), which starred Jal Merchant and Sabita Devi had the woman getting into marriage only if her doctor husband agreed not to want children. The success of the film mitigated the enraged public reaction at the time.

He showed his understanding of media publicity required for films when in 1937, Badami resorted to woo audiences by announcing cash prizes of Rs.500, Rs.200 and Rs.100 for the best reviews of his newly released film Kulvadhu (1937). The promotional gambit worked sending audiences to the theatres. According to an interview, most of Badami's films don't survive as the negatives were burnt to extract the silver from the silver nitrate.

== Later years ==
Apparently, in 1948 Deputy Prime Minister Vallabhbhai Patel, who was then also in charge of Information Ministry, on a visit to the Cine Laboratories Bombay, asked Badami to help set up a News Reel and Documentary section. The Films Division was established in 1948. He became chief producer in the newsreel department and made several documentaries. He worked in the Films Division making documentaries from 1948-1952. After that he stopped making films and returned to Bangalore to retire as "I was a forgotten man in the feature film world". He died in 2005 in Bangalore, Karnataka, India.

== Filmography ==
- Sri Rama Paduka Pattabhishekam (1932)
- Sakunthala (1932)
- Harishchandra (1932)
- Chandrahasa (1933)
- Grihalaxmi (1934)
- Vengeance is Mine aka Ver Ni Vasulat (1935)
- Dr. Madhurika (1935)
- Jeevan Lata (1936)
- Grama Kanya, aka Village Girl (1936)
- Kulvadhu (1937)
- Kokila (1937)
- Teen Sau Din Ke Baad aka 300 Days and After (1938)
- Ladies Only (1939)
- Aap Ki Marzi (1939)
- Sajani (1940)
- Chingari (1940)
- Bambai Ki Sair (1941)
- Khilona (1942)
- Prarthana (1943)
- Bhagya Laxmi (1944)
- Ramayani (1945)
- Uttara Abhimanyu (1946)
- Manmani (1947)
