= Chingari (1940 film) =

- Directed by: Sarvottam Badami
- Produced by: Sudama Productions
- Starring: Prithviraj Kapoor; Sabita Devi; E. Billimoria; Keshavrao Date
- Music by: Gyan Dutt
- Production company: Sudama Productions
- Release date: 1940
- Country: India
- Language: Hindi

Chingari (transl. Embers) is a 1940 social Hindi film directed by Sarvottam Badami. Made under the banner of Sudama Productions, the film had music by Gyan Dutt. Prithviraj Kapoor shifted from New Theatres Ltd. Calcutta to Bombay, where he worked under Badami in two films, Sajani and Chingari both made in 1940. The cast included Prithviraj Kapoor, Sabita Devi, E. Billimoria, Meera, Khatoon and Keshavrao Date.

The story was about a married woman who has been turned out of her husband's house by her in-laws citing her mother's supposedly bad reputation. She goes to live with her brother, who is financially not in a state to support her. The later scenes focus on attempts at reconciliation by her husband.

== Plot ==
Geeta, lives with her brother, who is financially too poor to support her. She is married, but leads a lonely life, as her father-in-law turns her out of the family house stating that her mother had a bad name in society. Her husband, Biren, now wants a reconciliation. The father-in-law is dead, as also is Biren's other wife through whom he has a son, Charan. Geeta initially is angrily opposed to any patch up but Charan's subsequent illness brings the couple together.

== Cast ==
- Prithviraj Kapoor
- Sabita Devi
- E. Billimoria
- Meera
- Khatoon
- Sunalini Devi
- Keshavrao Date
- Bhagwandas

== Review ==
According to Baburao Patel, in his review of the film in the June 1940 issue of Filmindia, the "lack of sufficient and correct publicity" was the reason for the film not being a commercial success at the box-office. He positively commended the director calling Badami a "'Chhota' Barua" (small Barua) as he felt Badami had "emulated" the director from Bengal in the manner the film was directed "A very nicely directed picture". Sabita was also praised for her performance as Gita, "which for its sheer sincerity is outstanding". However, he advised her to refrain from singing her own songs as her "bad singing, always unnecessary, lessens the intrinsic merit of her otherwise excellent performance". E Billimoria, "this old timer gave a good seasoned performance", and Prithviraj Kapoor were also lauded for their acting.

== Music ==
The music was composed by Gyan Dutt with lyrics written by J. S. Kashyap, Pyare Lal Santoshi. The singers were Durgesh Kumari, Amritlal Nagar, Patgaonkar, Sabita Devi and Khatoon.

=== Song list ===
#	Title	Singer	Lyricist
1	"Baaje Muraliya Baje Murli Meri Janam Ki Bairan"	Durgesh Kumari, Amritlal Nagar	J. S. Kashyap
2	"Kya Pachhtata Murakh Man Jab Chidiya Chug Gayi Khet"	Patgaonkar	J. S. Kashyap
3	"Tori Atariya Chor Sajani"	Sabita Devi, Khatoon	Santoshi
4	"Sajan Ke Ghar Jao Sajni"		J. S. Kashyap
5	"Mohe Bhi Jhoola Jhoolaaye Jao Ho"		Santoshi
6	"Holi Kaise Kheloongi Saanwariya Ke Sang"		J. S. Kashyap
7	"Mera Aali Rachega Byaah"		J. S. Kashyap
8	"Mil Gaye Jab Hriday Donon"		Santoshi
9	"Radheshyam Shyam Shyam Radheshyam Bhajo Re Bhai"	Patgaonkar	J. S. Kashyap
