= Bambai Ki Sair =

- Directed by: Sarvottam Badami
- Produced by: Sudama Productions
- Starring: Shobhna Samarth; E. Billimoria; Sabita Devi; Jal Merchant; Arun
- Music by: Khemchand Prakash
- Release date: 1941
- Country: India
- Language: Hindi

Bambai Ki Sair also known as Holiday in Bombay is a Bollywood social comedy film. It was released in 1941 and directed by Sarvottam Badami for Sudama Productions. The music direction was by Khemchand Prakash with lyrics by D. N. Madhok, Munshi Dil, B.R. Sharma and Pandit Indra. The film starred Shobhna Samarth, Sabita Devi, E. Billimoria, Jal Merchant, Arun, Vatsala Kumtekar Kantilal and Ghory.

== Cast ==
- Shobhana Samarth
- Sabita Devi
- Arun
- Vatsala Kumtekar
- E. Bilimoria
- Kantilal
- Jal Merchant
- Ghory

== Music ==
The music was composed by Khemchand Prakash with lyrics written by D. N. Madhok, Munshi Dil, B.R. Sharma and Pandit Indra.

=== Songlist ===
#	Title	Singer
1	"Chhed De Sajni" (Jinki Jawani Unka Zamana)	Shobhna Samarth, Kantilal
2	"Kheenchi Chitvan Chadhe Tevar"	Shobhna Samarth, Kantilal
3	"Meri Ankhein Sharaabi"	Vatsala Kumtekar
4	"Raat Pade Mat Rooth Deewani"	Kantilal
5	"Woh Baat Ki Hai Tune Bas Mazaa Aa Gaya"	Vatsala Kumtekar, Kantilal
6	"Tere Nainon Mein Naina Daale"	Vatsala Kumtekar
7	"Jaaye Na Paayi Ho Hamari Gali Aay Ke"	Vatsala Kumtekar
8	"Taare Kyun Muskayein"	Rajkumari, Kantilal, Vatsala Kumtekar
9	"Gar Zindagi Mein Pyar Ho"	
