= Motilal (actor) =

Indian actor and director (1910–1965)

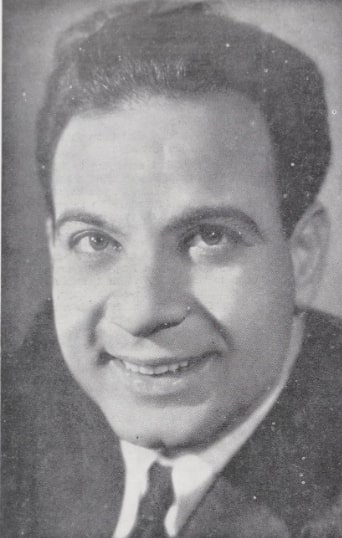
- Motilal c. 1942
- Born: Motilal Rajvansh; 4 December 1910; Shimla, Punjab, British India (present-day Himachal Pradesh, India)
- Died: 17 June 1965 (aged 54); Bombay, Maharashtra, India
- Years active: 1934–1965
- Partner: Shobhana Samarth
- Awards: Filmfare Best Supporting Actor Award (2); Certificate of Merit for the Best Story Writer

Motilal Rajvansh (4 December 1910 – 17 June 1965), known mononymously as Motilal, was an Indian film actor and director. He is often credited with pioneering a naturalistic style of acting in Indian cinema, moving away from the theatrical and melodramatic conventions prevalent at the time.

His best-known role was the titular character in Mr. Sampat (1952). He won the Filmfare Award for Best Supporting Actor for his performances in Devdas (1955) and Parakh (1960). He also directed Chhoti Chhoti Baten (1965), his sole directorial venture, which was released after his death. At the 13th National Film Awards, the film received a Certificate of Merit for the Third Best Feature Film, while Motilal was posthumously awarded a Certificate of Merit for the Best Story Writer.

== Early life and background ==
Born in Shimla on 4 December 1910, Motilal came from a distinguished family. His father was a renowned educationist, who died when Motilal was one year old. He was brought up by his uncle who was a well-known civil surgeon in Uttar Pradesh. At first, Motilal was sent to an English school at Shimla and later, in Uttar Pradesh (UP). Thereafter, he shifted to Delhi where he continued with school and college.

== Acting career ==
Motilal Rajvansh said of his screen career:

Married a 100 times, died almost twice, never born but always brought down by a parachute.

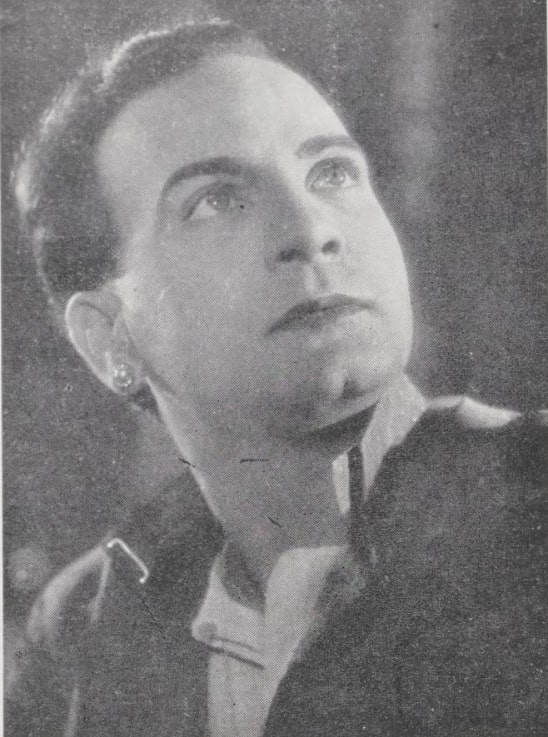
Motilal in the film Armaan

After leaving college, Moti came to Bombay to join the Navy, but he fell ill and could not appear for the test. Fate had other choices charted out for him. One day, he went to see a film shoot at Sagar Studios, where director K. P. Ghosh was shooting. Motilal, even then, was quite the man about the town and he caught Ghosh's eye. In 1934 (aged 24), he was offered the hero's role in Shaher Ka Jadoo (1934) by the Sagar Film Company. He later featured in several successful social dramas alongside Sabita Devi, including Dr. Madhurika (1935) and Kulvadhu (1937). He worked with Mehboob Khan in Jagirdar (1937) and Hum Tum Aur Woh (1938) under the Sagar Movietone banner, in Taqdeer (1943) for Mehboob Productions, and Kidar Sharma's Armaan (1942) and Kaliyan (1944). He also acted in S. S. Vasan's film Paigham (1959) (Gemini Studios), and Raj Kapoor's Jagte Raho (1956).

In 1965, he also acted in the Bhojpuri film Solaho Singar Kare Dulhaniya.

Perhaps the role for which he received the most critical appreciation was that of the gentleman crook in S. S. Vasan's adaptation of R K Narayan's book Mr Sampat (1952).

He is most remembered for his role as "Chunni Babu" in Bimal Roy's Devdas (1955), for which he won his first Filmfare Best Supporting Actor Award. He won the trophy the second time for Parakh (1960). Reviewing the film in 2014, Sukanya Verma of Rediff.com noted, "What lends Parakh a sort of enchantment is Motilal's Fairy Godmotherish presence in the story. As the postmaster's limping subordinate Haradhan, he's the carrier of this commotion-inducing letter."

== Personal life ==
Motilal was very suave and polished, and moved in high society, though towards the end of his life he was in financial difficulty. Although a thorough gentleman, he enjoyed gambling and races, and died almost penniless in 1965.

He was in a relationship for several years with the actress Nadira. He was later involved with actress Shobhna Samarth after she separated from her husband, and he played Samarth's real-life daughter Nutan's father in Hamari Beti, Shobhana's launch movie for Nutan. He also played her guardian in Anari, though this time the role had a villainous touch to it.

== Partial filmography ==
Year	Film	Role	Notes
1934	Shaher Ka Jadoo		Debut film
1934	Vatan Parasta		
1935	Do Ghadi Ki Mauj		
1935	Dr. Madhurika	Narendra	
1935	Silver King		
1936	Dilawar		
1936	Do Diwane		
1936	Jeevan Lata		
1936	Lagna Bandhan		
1937	Captain Kirti Kumar		
1937	Jagirdar	Ramesh	
1937	Kokila		
1937	Kulvadhu		
1938	Hum Tum Aur Woh	Moti	
1938	Teen Sau Din Ke Baad	Sudhir	
1939	Aap Ki Marzi	Sumant	
1939	Sach Hai		
1940	Achhut	Ramu	
1940	Holi	Chand	
1941	Pardesi		
1941	Sasural		
1942	Armaan	Kunwar	
1943	Aage Kadam		
1943	Taqdeer	Babu alias Pappu	
1943	Tasveer		
1944	Dost		
1944	Mujrim		
1944	Raunaq		
1944	Umang		
1945	Moorti		
1945	Pehli Nazar		
1945	Bisvi Sadi		
1946	Phoolwari		
1947	Do Dil		
1948	Aaj Ki Raat		
1948	Gajre	Mohan	
1948	Munna		
1949	Ek Thi Larki	Ranjeet	
1949	Lekh		
1950	Hamari Beti		
1950	Hanste Aansoo	Kumar	First Indian film to be awarded an "Only Adults (A)" Certification
1952	Apni Izzat		
1952	Mr. Sampat	Sampat	
1953	Dhoon		
1953	Ek Do Teen	Motilal	
1953	Paheli Shaadi		
1954	Mastana	Mastana	
1955	Devdas	Chunnilal	
1956	Jagte Raho	Unnamed Drunk Husband	
1957	Ab Dilli Dur Nahin	Hariram	
1959	Anari	Ramnath Sohanlal	
1959	Paigham	Sewakram	
1960	Parakh	Jagadish Chandra Roy alias Haradhan	
1960	Zameen Ke Tare	Dhannu	
1962	Asli-Naqli	Colonel Mishra	
1963	Yeh Rastey Hain Pyar Ke	Ali Khan	
1964	Ji Chahta Hai		
1964	Leader	Acharya	
1965	Waqt	Public Prosecutor	
1965	Solaho Singaar Kare Dulhaniya		Bhojpuri film
1965	Chhoti Chhoti Baaten	Motilal	Only film as producer, director and writer; last film
1966	Yeh Zindagi Kitni Haseen Hai	Jolkar	Last released film

== Accolades ==
Year	Award	Category	Film	Result	Ref.
1957	4th Filmfare Awards	Best Supporting Actor	Devdas	Won	
1961	8th Filmfare Awards	Best Supporting Actor	Parakh	Won	
1965	13th National Film Awards	Certificate of Merit for the Best Story Writer	Chhoti Chhoti Baten	Won	

== Legacy ==
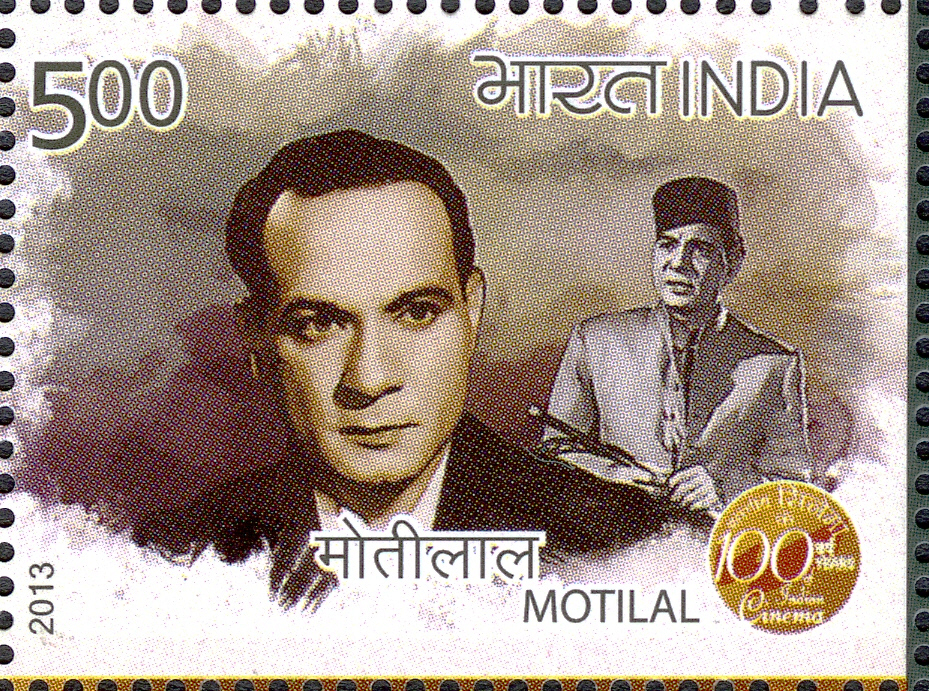
Motilal on the 2013 commemorative stamp issued by India Post

India Post issued a commemorative postage stamp honouring Motilal in 2013, marking the centenary of Indian cinema.

According to the Encyclopaedia of Indian Cinema, Motilal "[e]laborated a realistic acting style relying on casual dialogue delivery", which is "often hailed as the first example of naturalistic film acting in India". The Encyclopaedia of Hindi Cinema likewise comments: "One of the finest actors of his time, Motilal Rajvansh is credited with having pioneered a shift from the prevalent theatrical, and melodramatic style of acting to a more naturalistic style."

Actors who acknowledged Motilal's influence include Dilip Kumar and Dev Anand. On his 107th birth anniversary in 2017, actor Rishi Kapoor referred to Motilal as "the most natural actor on the screen". Amitabh Bachchan wrote in the foreword of The Hundred Luminaries of Hindi Cinema:

Not much has been written in praise of a great and very natural actor. He [Motilal] was greatly ahead of his times. Were he alive today his sheer versatility would have ensured a place for him even now. In fact, he would be doing much better than many of us.
