= Yakub (actor) =

Indian actor (1903-1958)

- Born: Yakub Khan; 3 April 1903; Jabalpur, Madhya Pradesh, British India
- Died: 24 August 1958 (aged 55); Bombay, Bombay State, India
- Occupation: Actor
- Years active: 1924 – 1958
- Spouse: Lakshmiben

Yakub Khan (3 April 1903 – 24 August 1958), popularly known as Yakub, was an Indian actor born into a Pathan family in Jabalpur, Madhya Pradesh. He is best known for his comic and comic villainous roles.

He began his career with roles as an extra, but eventually was cast in more important roles, frequently playing the parts of heroes and villains. He became one of the most renowned screen villains, while achieving equal success in comedy and character roles. Yakub appeared in over 100 films.

== Early life ==
Yakub ran away from home at an early age, and performed odd jobs, such as a motor mechanic and table waiter, before joining the crew of the ship S.S. Madura as a kitchen worker. He left the ship after travelling to various places, like London, Brussels and Paris, then returned to Calcutta, where he worked as a tourist guide, among other jobs. Around 1924, he moved to Bombay (now Mumbai) and joined the Sharda Film Company.

== Career ==
During his travels, Yakub watched American films, and became greatly influenced by Eddie Polo, Douglas Fairbanks Sr., Wallace Beery and later by Humphrey Bogart. Yakub's cinematic debut was the silent film Bajirao Mastani (1925), which starred Master Vithal. His first talkie was Meri Jaan (1931), where he played the title role of the Prince. This film has also been credited as Romantic Prince. His portrayal of Birju in Aurat (1940) was well received and his acting in this film is considered one of the finest performances in Indian cinema. Yakub's popularity in those days can be gauged by the credit roll of films such as the S K Ojha directed Hulchul (1951), which had a star cast of Dilip Kumar, Nargis and Sitara Devi, where his name was credited as '...and your favourite, Yakub'.

Yakub was an "acknowledged master of comedy" along with other actors such as Johnny Walker, Gope and Agha, according to the B. K. Karanjia co-edited book Genres of Indian Cinema. His comic pairing with Gope and Agha was so well liked by the audiences, that they all appeared in multiple films together. For example, Sagai (1951), Patanga (1949) and Beqasoor (1950) . Yakub was one of the highest paid actors from 1930 to early 1950.

== Director ==
Yakub directed three films; Sagar Ka Sher and Uski Tamanna in the 1930s, and Aiye in 1949. Sagar Ka Sher, or Lion of Sagar, was the first film he directed in 1937 under the Sagar Movietone banner. His co-stars in this film were Bibbo, Pesi Patel, Sankatha Prasad, Raja Mehdi and David. Uski Tamanna, also known as Her Last Desire, was made in 1939 under Sagar and directed by Yakub. The film starred Yakub, Maya, Bhudo Advani, Kaushalya, Sankatha Prasad, Satish and Putli. He directed his third and last movie, Aiye, in 1949 under the Indian Production banner. It had Sulochana Chatterjee, Masud, Jankidas, Sheela Naik, and Ashraf Khan along with Yakub. The music in this film was composed by Nashad (Shaukat Dehlvi) and was Mubarak Begum's first film as a playback singer. Yakub's second cousin Allaudin was the song recordist for this film. However, he lost money on this film and called it the biggest mistake of his life.

When Mehmood was a struggling artist, he would hang around Bombay Talkies waiting for Yakub to arrive. Yakub, knowing his financial state, would give him one or two rupees in the form of loose change.

Yakub was a deeply religious person and was called 'Maulana' by his friends.

== Death ==
Yakub died in Bombay, Maharashtra, India, on 24 August 1958, at the age of 54 years.

== Filmography ==
Yakub acted in over 100 films in a career covering 34 years. A brief filmography is listed.

Year	Film	Director
1925	Bajirao Mastani	Bhal G. Pendharkar
1927	Gulzar	Nanubhai Desai
1928	Chandravali	Begum Fatima
1930	Nai Roshni	Bhagwati Mishra
1931	Meri Jaan (Romantic Prince)	Prafulla Ghosh
1932	Bulbul-E-Baghdad	Nanubhai Vakil
1933	Miss 1933	Chandulal Shah
1935	Al Hilal (Judgement of Allah)	Mehboob Khan
1936	Do Diwane	Chimanlal Luhar
1936	Grama Kanya (Village Girl)	Sarvottam Badami
1936	Manmohan	Mehboob Khan
1937	Sagar Ka Sher (Lion of Sagar)	Yakub
1937	Milap	A. R. Kardar
1938	Teen Sau Din Ke Baad (300 Days and After)	Sarvottam Badami
1938	Watan	Mehboob Khan
1939	Uski Tamanna (Her Last Desire)	Yakub
1940	Aurat	Mehboob Khan
1943	Aabroo	Nazir
1943	Najma	Mehboob Khan
1944	Lal Haveli	K. B. Lall
1945	Zeenat	Shaukat Hussain Rizvi
1946	Nek Pervin	S. M. Yusuf
1946	Devar	S. M. Yusuf
1947	Samaj Ko Badal Dalo	Vijay Bhatt
1949	Aiye	Yakub
1949	Patanga	H. S. Rawail
1949	Sipahiya	Aspi Irani
1950	Beqasoor	K. Amarnath
1951	Hulchul	Shubh Karan Ojha
1951	Deedar	Nitin Bose
1954	Waris	Nitin Bose
1957	Ab Dilli Dur Nahin	Amar Kumar
1957	Paying Guest	Subodh Mukherjee
1958	Adalat	Kalidas
1958	Ten O'Clock	Jugal Kishore
