= Faredoon Irani =

Indian cinematographer

Faredoon A. Irani was an Indian cinematographer who worked in Hindi films. He shot Mehboob Khan's films Andaz (1949), Aan (1952) and Mother India (1958).

During his career, he won the Filmfare Award for Best Cinematographer record two times, for Mother India (1958) and Duniya (1970).

== Career ==
In 1935, he shot Mehboob Khan's directorial debut film, Judgement of Allah (1935), which in turn was inspired by The Sign of the Cross (1932) by Cecil B. DeMille. Subsequently, he worked as cinematographer for all of Mehboob Khan's films, including Anmol Ghadi (1946), Andaz (1949), Aan (1952) - India's first technicolor film, Amar (1954) and Mother India (1958), which not only got him critical acclaim, but also his first Filmfare Award.

A leading cinematographer of his time, he also presided over the meeting which led to the formation of Western India Cinematographers' Association (WICA) on 2 August 1953 in Mumbai.

== Filmography ==
- Narsinh Mehta (1932, Gujarati)
- Grihalaxmi (1934)
- Vengeance is Mine (1935
- Dr. Madhurika (1935)
- Al Hilal a.k.a. Judgement of Allah (1935)
- Deccan Queen (1936)
- Grama Kanya a.k.a. Village Girl (1936)
- Manmohan (1936)
- Kokila (1937)
- Teen Sau Din Ke Baad (1938)
- Ek Hi Raasta (1939)
- Aurat (1940)
- Bahen (1941)
- Roti (1942)
- Najma (1943)
- Humayun (1945)
- Anmol Ghadi (1946)
- Anokhi Ada (1948)
- Andaz (1949)
- Aan (1952)
- Amar (1954)
- Mother India (1958)
- Palki (1967)
- Aadmi (1968)
- Duniya (1968)
- Gambler (1971)

== Awards ==
- Filmfare Award for Best Cinematographer
  - 1958: Mother India
  - 1970: Duniya
