= List of Hindi films of 1938 =

A list of films produced by the Bollywood film industry based in Mumbai in 1938:

== 1938 ==
Some of the noteworthy films of 1938:

- Street Singer is considered as an "all time classic" from New Theatres Calcutta. The film starred K. L. Saigal, Kanan Devi, Jagdish Sethi and Bikram Kapoor with music by R. C. Boral. Directed by Prafulla Ghosh, the film established Kanan Devi's popularity and her 'melody queen' status. It is also ranked as one of Saigal's greatest hits, where his rendition of Wajid Ali Shah's bhairavi thumri "Babul Mora Naihar Chhooto Jaye" is considered a classic.
- Dharti Mata directed by Nitin Bose for New Theatres, was a social film with a romantic component. The film starred K. L. Saigal, Uma Shashi, Kamlesh Kumari and Jagdish Sethi. It was a bilingual made in Bengali (Desher Maate) (1938) and Hindi at the same time. The film had the classic song, "Duniya Rang Rangili Baba". It was made against the backdrop of the rural (agriculture) and urban (technology) debate and highlighted the need of technology and new concepts for effective farming.
- Gopal Krishna was a remake of Prabhat Film Company's first silent film Gopal Krishna (1929). The film was made in Hindi and Marathi simultaneously. Directed by Sheikh Fattelal and V. G. Damle, it starred Ram Marathe, Shanta Apte, Ganpatrao, and Parshuram. The music was by Master Krishnarao. Made during the pre-independent India era, the story based on the young Lord Krishna is less mythology and more about a social awareness for change against the British regime. The film was a big success and appreciated for its music and sets.

== A-B ==
| Title | Director | Cast | Genre | Notes |
|---|---|---|---|---|
| Abhagin | Prafulla Roy | Vijay Kumar, Molina, Prithviraj Kapoor, Kamla Jharia, Chaman Puri, Pankaj Mullick, Nemo, Bikram Kapoor, Devbala, Trilok Kapoor, Rajlakshmi | Social | New Theatres. Music: R. C. Boral; Lyrics: Arzu Lucknavi, Rashid Gorakhpuri |
| Adhikar | P. C. Barua | P. C. Barua, Pahari Sanyal, Jamuna, Menaka Devi, Molina Devi, Rajlakshmi, Sailen Choudhary, Indubala, Pankaj Mullick, Chitralekha, Jagdish Sethi, Bikram Kapoor | Social Romantic drama | New Theatres. Music: Timir Baran; Lyrics: Arzu Lucknavi |
| Alauddin Aur Jadui Chirag a.k.a. Alladin And The Wonderful Lamp | Nanubhai Vakil | Navinchandra, Bansi Karnataki, Moti, G. Kadar, Sundari, Moosa, Sardar Mansur, Pokhraj | Fantasy Action | Indian Liberty. Music: Damodar Sharma; Lyrics: N. C. Pande, Akhtar, D. N. Madhok |
| Asha | Perry Devia, Ranjit Sen | Vijay Kumar, Kamlesh Kumari, Poorna Choudhary, Kamran, Natwar, Tulsi Lahiri, R. P. Kapoor, Dev Bala | Social | Film Corporation of India. Music: Bikram Choudhary; Lyrics: L. Meghani |
| Baghban | Abdul Rashid Kardar | Bimla Kumari, Sitara Devi, Nazir, Yasmin, B. Nandrekar, Ashraf Khan, K. N. Singh, Putlibai, Mirza Musharraf, Wasti, Lala Yaqub | Social Drama | General Films. Music: Lyrics: : Mushtaq Hussain; Lyrics: Mirza Musharraf |
| Bahadur Kisan | Bhagwan, Chandrarao Kadam | Hansa Wadkar, Bhagwan, Indira Wadkar, Chandrarao, Vasantrao Phalwan, Sunetra, Varne, Devraj | Social | Chandra Art. Music: Mir Sahib; Lyrics: Ehsan Rizvi |
| Ban Ki Chidiya | Jayant Desai | E. Billimoria, Madhuri, Ishwarlal, Charlie, Ghory, Apte, Kesari | Action | Ranjit Studios. Music: Gyan Dutt; Lyrics: Pyare Lal Santoshi |
| Banke Sawariya | Nanubhai Vakil | Navinchandra, Vatsala Kumtekar, Sardar Mansur, Yasmin, Maruti Rao, Mirajkar | Action Romance | Indian Liberty Pictures. Music: Damodar Sharma; Lyrics: |
| Bazigar | Manibhai Vyas | Trilok Kapoor, Khatoon, Ila Devi, Charlie, Suresh, Anees Baig | Action | Ranjit Pictures. Music: Gyan Dutt; Lyrics: Pyare Lal Santoshi |
| Bhabhi | Franz Osten | P. Jairaj, Renuka Devi, Maya Devi, P. F. Pithawala, V. H. Desai, Rama Shukul, M. Nazir, Ranibala, Lalita Devulkar, Saroj Borkar, Agha Jani Kashmiri | Social Family Drama | Bombay Talkies. Music: Saraswati Devi; Lyrics: J. S. Kashyap, Mira Bai |
| Bhedi Burkha | A. H. Essa | Ganpat Bhalerao, Bansi Karnataki, Ghulam Qadir, Bose, Mirajkar, Roshan, Faiman, Ali | Action Suspense | Indian Liberty Pics. Music: Damodar Sharma; Lyrics: |
| Bhedi Trishul | A. M. Khan | Shiraz, Zohra, Ata Mohammed, Ameena, Khatoon, Kamala, Ansari, Haroon | Action | Mohan Pictures. Music: Mushtaq Hussain; Lyrics: Munshi Nayab |
| Billi a.k.a. The Cat | Jayant Desai | E. Billimoria, Sunita, Ila Devi, Ishwarlal, Ram Apte, Mazhar, Ghory, Kalyani Das | Action | Ranjit Pictures. Music: Gyan Dutt; Lyrics: Pyare Lal Santoshi |
| Brahmachari | Master Vinayak | Minakshi, Vinayak, Damuanna Malvankar, V. G. Jog, Salvi | Social | Huns Pictures. Music: Chandekar; Lyrics: Pandit Indra |

== C-F ==
| Title | Director | Cast | Genre | Notes |
|---|---|---|---|---|
| Chabukwali | A. M. Khan | Shiraz, Romila, Hirabai, Sultan, Garib Shah, F. M. Khan, Haroon, S. Rafiq, Kamla, S. S. Koko | Action | Mohan Pictures. Music: A. C. Vishwas; Lyrics: Munshi Nayab |
| Chhote Sarkar | Homi Master | Jal Merchant, Leela Chitnis, Mehar Sultana, Keki Adjania, Rewashankar, Jamshedji, Rajkumari, Aziz, Heera | Social | Sunder Movies. Music: Shanti Kumar Desai; Lyrics: Pandit Indra |
| Cyclewali | A. M. Khan | Benjamin, Ramola, Khatoon, Shiraz, Ansari, Ameena, Haroon, S. Alam | Action | Mohan Pictures Music: Bashir, Krishna Swamy; Lyrics: A. M. Khan |
| Devbala | Baburao Apte | Benjamin, Mehtab, Rajkumari, Amritlal, Tara, Gulab, Khatoon, Ghulam Hussain, Abdul Rahman Kabuli | Costume | JayaBharat. Music: Shanti Kumar Desai; Lyrics: A. R. Kabuli |
| Dharti Mata | Nitin Bose | K. L. Saigal, Uma Shashi, Kamlesh Kumari, K. C. Dey, Jagdish Sethi, Nemo, Bikram Kapoor, Nawab, Siraj, Vaid, Sham Laha and Iliyas | Social | New Theatres. Music: Pankaj Mullick; Lyrics: Pandit Sudarshan |
| Dhruv Kumar | K. P. Bhave | Indira Wadkar, Raja Paranjpe, Kumar Prabhakar, Rohini, Manohar | Mythology Devotional | Shalini Cine Music: Vishwanath Buwa Jadhav; Lyrics: S. K. Prem |
| Double Cross | M. D. Bhavnani | Bimla Kumari, Dilawar, Master Hussain, Nayampalli, David, Ameena, Fatty Prasad, A. S. Gyani, Rai Mohan | Social | Bhavnani Productions. Music: Badri Prasad; Lyrics: |
| Dulhan | Premankur Atorthy | Rattan Bai, Ghulam Mohammed, W. M. Khan, Jilloobai | Social | Imperial Film Company. Music: Ram Gopal Pande; Lyrics: |
| Duniya Kya Hai | G. P. Pawar | Lalita Pawar, Madhav Kale, Indira Wadkar, Begum Fatima, Ghanshyam, Bipin Mehta, Varne | Social | Diamond Pictures. Music: Annasahib Mainkar, Kikubhai Yagnik; Lyrics: Munshi Aziz |
| Dynamite | C. M. Luhar | Surendra, Bibbo, Yakub, Maya Bannerji, Kayam Ali, Sankatha Prasad, Jamu Patel, Pande, Bhudo Advani | Action | Sagar Movietone. Music: Anil Biswa; Lyrics: Zia Sarhadi |
| Fashionable Wife | Dhirubhai Desai | Anil Kumar, Suvarna, Urmila, S. Nazir, Chandrika, Samson, Mehar Sultana | Social | Vishnu Cine. Music: Kikubhai Yagnik; Lyrics: |

== G-J ==
| Title | Director | Cast | Genre | Notes |
|---|---|---|---|---|
| Ghunghatwali | Kanjibhai. J. Rathod | Prem Adib, Rajkumari, Ansuya, Vidya, Charlie, Fazlu, Haridas | Action | Vishwa Kala. Music: Shanti Kumar Desai; Lyrics: Pandit Amar |
| Gopal Krishna | V. G. Damle, Sheikh Fattelal | Shanta Apte, Ram Marathe, Parshuram, Ulhas, Sophia, Ganpat Rao, Karuna Devi, Haribau, Prahlad | Religious | Prabhat Film Company Music: Master Krishnarao; Lyrics: Pandit Anuj |
| Gorakh Aya | Chaturbhuj Doshi | Trilok Kapoor, Rajkumari, Mazhar Khan, Kalyani Das, Ram Apte, Sarla, Bhagwandas, Ila Devi | Devotional | Ranjit Pictures. Music: Gyan Dutt; Lyrics: Pyare Lal Santoshi |
| Gramophone Singer | Chimanlal Desai, Ramchandra Thakur | Surendra, Bibbo, Prabha Devi, Sankatha Prasad, Bhudo Advani, Kayam Ali, Pesi Patel, Sawant, Kanhaiyalal, Gulzar | | Sagar Movietone. Music: Lyrics: Pandit Sudarshan |
| Himalay Ki Beti | M. D. Bhavnani | Enakshi Rama Rao, Maya Chatterji, S. L. Puri, Ramanand Sharma, David, Badri Prasad, Rai Mohan, Gyani | Costume | Bhavnani Productions. Music: Badri Prasad; Lyrics: Narottam Vyas |
| Hum Tum Aur Woh | Mehboob Khan | Motilal, Rose, Yakub, Harish, Maya, Bhudo Advani, Sankatha Prasad, Sunalini Devi, Pande | | Sagar Movietone. Music:Anil Biswas; Lyrics: Wajahat Mirza, Zia Sarhadi |
| Impossible | R. N. Vaidya | Protima Das Gupta, Baburao Pahelwan, Nazir Begum, Shahjahan, Sunder, V. K. Das, Sunderlal | Action | Indira Movies. Music: Prem Kumar; Lyrics: |
| Industrial India | Mohan Sinha | Shobhana Samarth, Prem Adib, Wasti, Shama Devi, K. N. Singh, Mirza Musharraf | Social | General Films. Music: Mushtaq Hussain; Lyrics: Mohan Sinha |
| Jailor | Sohrab Modi | Leela Chitnis, Sohrab Modi, E. Tarapore, Kamala Kumari, Sharifa, Kusum Deshpande, Abu Bakar, Sadiq Ali | Social Drama | Minerva Movietone Music: Mir Sahib; Lyrics: Kamal Amrohi |
| Jeevan Ek Paheli | P. Razdan | | Social | Central India Theatres. Music: Lyrics: |
| Jungle Ka Javan | Chunilal Parekh | Shankar Vazre, Rajkumari, Putlibai, Kamala Kumari, Fakir Mohammed, Garib Shah, Jamshid Banu, Haroon, Narsi | Action | Mohan Pictures. Music: Amulyacharan Biswas; Lyrics: Munshi Jilani Shyam |
| Jwala | Master Vinayak | Chandra Mohan, Ratnaprabha, Master Vinayak, Rajani, Dhavale, Chandrakant, Bulbule | Costume Drama | Huns Pictures. Music: Dhamman Khan, Chandekar; Lyrics: Pandit Indra |

== K-M ==
| Title | Director | Cast | Genre | Notes |
|---|---|---|---|---|
| Karmaveer | Vithaldas Panchotia | Radharani, V. Panchotia, Prabha Devi, Leela, Jayshankar, Putlibai, Khalil, Heera, Fakir Chand, M. Isaq | Action | Sitaram Cine. Music: Nagardas Nayak; Lyrics: Vithaldas Panchotia |
| Khatarnak Aurat | | | Action | Madan Theatres. Music: Lyrics: |
| Kis Liye | J. K. Mehta | Mohini, Ghulam Mohammed, Padma Devi, Ghulam Rasool, Rafiqe Ghaznavi, Asuji | Social | Imperial Films. Music: K. Bhole; Lyrics: |
| Lal Bujakkad | Kanti Patel | Padmini, Kashinath, Shahzadi Jahangir, Fakir Mohammed, Lakshmi, Kusum | Action | National Cine Corporation. Music: Master Madhavlal; Lyrics: |
| Lutaru Lalna | Homi Wadia | Fearless Nadia, Sardar Mansur, Sayani Atish, Master Mohammed, Dilawar, Sarita Devi, Boman Shroff, Mithu Miyan, Nazira, Minoo Cooper | Action Adventure | Wadia Movietone Music: Master Madhav, Baldev Nayak; Lyrics: Pandit Gyan Chandra |
| Madhraat Ka Mehmaan | Kikubhai Desai | Moti, Shankar Vazre, Ganpat Rao, Dhulia, Bose, Bachcha | Action | Indian Liberty. Music: Master Basant; Lyrics: |
| Madhur Milan | Zia Sarhadi | P. Jairaj, Khursheed, Zebunisa, Hari Shivdasani, Balabhai | Social Romance Drama | Saroj Movietone. Music: Lyrics: |
| Master Man a.k.a. Ustad | G. K. Mehta | Leela Chitnis, Majid Khan, Indira Wadkar, Gope, Ramlal, Jeevan, Dar, Gulab | Action | Music: Sunderdas Bhatia; Lyrics: Ehsan Rizvi, M. R. Kapoor |
| Meetha Zahar | Sohrab Modi | Naseem Banu, Sohrab Modi, Shanta Dutt, E. Tarapore, Sadiq Ali, Ghulam Hussain, Fakir Chand, Gajanan Jagirdar, Ghulam Mohiuddin, Sheela, Abu Bakar | Social Drama | Minerva Movietone. Music: B. S. Hoogan; Lyrics: Munshi Irshad Ahmed |
| Mera Ladka | Keshav Narayan Kale | Shahu Modak, Shanta Hublikar, Ulhas, Balakram, Vasant Thengdi, Sundarabai, Mama Bhatt | Social | Prabhat Film Company. Music: Keshavrao Bhole; Lyrics: Pandit Anuj |
| Mother India | Gunjal | Pramila, W. M. Khan, Sharifa, Ghulam Mohammed, Ashiq Hussain, Sushila, Ghulam Rasool | Social | Indian Cine Pictures. Music: Ram Gopal Pande; Lyrics: |
| Mr.X | Dwarka Khosla | Rattan Bai, Jayant, Ranjit, Indurani, Anant Marathe, Hari Shivdasani, Shyam Sunder, Lallubhai | | Music: Shankar Rao Vyas, Lallubhai Nayak; Lyrics: Pandit Anuj |

== N-P ==
| Title | Director | Cast | Genre | Notes |
|---|---|---|---|---|
| Na Honewali Baat | R. N. Vaidya | Protima Das Gupta, V. K. Das, Nazir Begum, Baburao Pehalwan, Sunder, Shanti, Shahjahan | Action | Indira Movies. Music: Prem Kumar; Lyrics: H. S. Rawail, Safdar Mirza |
| Nandakumar | K. Dhaibar | Durga Khote, Anant Marathe, Govind Kurvalikar, Jayshree Kamulkar, Govindrao Tembe | Devotional | Jayshree Films. Music: G. P. Kapoor; Lyrics: Pandit Vir |
| Nirmala | Franz Osten | Devika Rani, Ashok Kumar, Maya Devi, Balwant Singh, Sankatha Prasad, Mumtaz Ali, Nazir Bedi, P. F. Pithawala, Saroj Borkar, M. Nazir, Gulab | Social | Bombay Talkies. Music: Saraswati Devi; Lyrics: J. S. Kashyap |
| Perfect Man a.k.a. Nigah-e-Kamil | Rukesh | Sita, Ghulam Mohammed, Lakshmi, Ghulam Rasool, Kesar, Kakir Chand | Action | Circle Pictures. Music: Ram Gopal Pande; Lyrics: |
| Purnima | Balwant Bhatt | Sardar Akhtar, Umakant, Ranjit, Noor Jehan, Shirin, Badri Prasad, Shanker Rao, Putlibai, Tarabai, Lallubhai, Jahangir, Athavale, Gulab | Social | Prakash. Music: Shankar Rao Vyas; Lyrics: Pandit Anuj |
| Postman | Zia Sarhadi, Mahendra Thakore | Kumar, Bibbo, Yakub, Maya Devi, Harish, Sankatha Prasad, Sunalini Devi, Bhudo Advani | Social | Sagar Movietone. Music: Anil Biswas; Lyrics: Zia Sarhadi |
| Prem Samadhi | G. K. Mehta | Khursheed, Zebunissa, Shyam Sunder, Prabhashankar Balabhai, Yusuf Effendi | Social | Saroj Movies Music: Keshavrao Naik; Lyrics: |
| Prithvi Putra | Jayant Desai | Madhuri, E. Billimoria, Mazhar Khan, Waheedan Bai, Ram Apte, Ghory, Dinkar, Kantilal, Khatoon, Kalyani Das, Radha | Mythology | Ranjit Pictures. Music: Gyan Dutt; Lyrics: Pyare Lal Santoshi |
| Professor Waman M. Sc. | Manibhai Vyas | E. Billimoria, Sitara Devi, Mazhar Khan, Sunita, Bhagwandas, Rajkumari, Waheedan Bai, Ibrahim, Kesari, Satyavati | Social | Ranjit Pictures. Music: Gyan Dutt; Lyrics: Pyare Lal Santoshi |
| Punarjanma | Ramnik Desai | Jal Merchant, Roshanara Begum, Putlibai, Baburao, Dinkar, Gangaram, Jivanand, Sadiq | Action | Royal Movies. Music: Shanti Kumar Desai, Lyrics: Arshad Gujrati, Akhtar |

== R-S ==
| Title | Director | Cast | Genre | Notes |
|---|---|---|---|---|
| Raja Gopichand | Bhalji Pendharkar | Ratnaprabha, Chandrakanta, Leela Chitnis, Ranade, G. M. Londhe, Dongre, Danve, Usha, Dinkar Kamanna | Devotional | Saraswati Cine. Music: C. Balaji; Lyrics: |
| Rajkumari | Dwarka Khosla | Lalita Pawar, Nazir, Jeevan, Shiraz, Gope, Ameena, O. K. Dar, Omkar, Majid | Costume | Krishna Movies. Music: Sunderdas Bhatia; Lyrics: |
| Rangila Mazdoor | S. M. Yusuf | Harishchandra Rao, Violet Cooper, Shah Nawaz, Nazira, Dilawar, Agha, A. Haq, Gulshan, Bismillah | Social | Wadia Movietone. Music: Master Madhavlal Damodar; Lyrics: Waheed Qureshi |
| Rifle Girl | Rama Chowdhary | P. Jairaj, Rose, Yusuf Effendi, Balabhai, Mehdi Raja, Bibijan | Action | Saroj Movies. Music: B. R. Devdhar; Lyrics: Arzu Lucknavi |
| Rikshawala | Ezra Mir | Mazhar Khan, Indubala, Ila Devi, Charlie, Wasti, Waheedan Bai, Dixit, Ghory, Tarabai | Social | Ranjit Pictures. Music: Gyan Dutt; Lyrics: Pyare Lal Santoshi |
| Royal Commander | M. Udwadia | Anil Kumar, Noor Jehan, Ashiq Hussain, Mehar Sultana, Fazlu, Samson, Gulab, F. M. Butt | Action | Vishnu. Music: Shyam Babu Pathak; Lyrics: Kabil Amritsari |
| Sathi | P. Y. Altekar | Durga Khote, Mubarak, Vimla Sardesai, Nyampalli, Salvi, Bachchu, Kaka Joglekar | Social | Nataraj Films. Music: Govindrao Tembe; Lyrics: Pandit Anand Kumar |
| The Secretary | Chaturbhuj Doshi | Madhuri, Trilok Kapoor, Rajkumari, Charlie, Waheedan Bai, Kalyani Das | Social | Ranjit Pictures. Music: Gyan Dutt; Lyrics: Pyare Lal Santoshi |
| Sharif Daku | G. R. Sethi | Navinchandra, Padma Devi, Noor Jehan, Ghulam Hussain, F. M. Butt, Mukhtar, Baburao | Action | Jaybharat Movies. Music: Shanti Kumar Desai; Lyrics: G. R. Sethi |
| Sneh Lagna | Chandrarao Kadam | Hansa Wadkar, Chandrarao, Shyam Sunder, Ansuya, Jeevan, Fakir Mohammed, Gangaprasad Pathak | Social Drama | Chandra Art. Music: Mulraj Kapadia; Lyrics: D. N. Madhok |
| State Express | Vijay Bhatt | Sardar Akhtar, Jayant, M. Zahur, Shirin, Lallubhai Nayak, Ismail, Jahangir, Vithaldas, Athavale, Umakant | Action | Prakash Pictures. Music: Lallubhai Nayak; Lyrics: Pandit Anuj |
| Stree | Saqi | Shakuntala, Roshan Ara Begum, Mirajkar, Amir Hussain | Social | Radio Sound Pictures. Music: Lyrics: |
| Street Singer | Phani Majundar | K. L. Saigal, Kanan Devi, Jagdish Sethi, Brij Pal, Bikram Kapoor, Shabir, A. H. Shore, Abdul Rehman, Rekha, Chamanlal, Vaid, Purnima Devi, Ram Kumari | Social Romance Musical | New Theatres Music: R. C. Boral; Lyrics: Arzu Lucknavi |
| Sunehra Baal | Narottam Vyas | Radharani, Firoz Dastur, Badri Prasad, Vasantrao Pehalwan, Indurani, Sharifa | Action | Raj Movietone. Music: Firoz Dastur; Lyrics: |

== T-Z ==
| Title | Director | Cast | Genre | Notes |
|---|---|---|---|---|
| Talaq a.k.a. Divorce | Sohrab Modi | Naseem Banu, Prem Adib, Sohrab Modi, Gajanan Jagirdar, Navin Yagnik, Sheela, Vimla Vashishta, Abu Bakar, Sheela, Khan Mastana, Sunalini Devi, Khwaja Sabir | Social Family Drama | Minerva Movietone. Music: Mir Sahib; Lyrics: Pandit Anand Kumar |
| Talwar Ka Dhani | Dhirubhai Desai | Anil Kumar, Mehar Sultana, Ghulam Hussain, Urmila, Putlibai, Anwaribai, Samson | Action | Vishnu Music: Kikubhai Yagnik; Lyrics: |
| Tarzan Ki Beti | Roop K. Shorey | Majnu, Shama Devi, Jeevan, G. N. Butt, Nafees Begum, Manek, Harold Lewis, Baig | Action | Aurora Film Corporation. Music: Anupam Ghatak; Lyrics: |
| Teen Sau Din Ke Baad a.k.a. Three Hundred Days And After | Sarvottam Badami | Motilal, Sabita Devi, Yakub, Bibbo, Pesi Patel, Sankatha Prasad, Gulzar, Pande, Rukmani, Piroz Wadkar, Yusuf | Social | Sagar Pictures. Music: Anil Biswas; Lyrics: Zia Sarhadi |
| Toofan Express | Chunilal Parekh | Jal Merchant, Rajkumari, Agha, Nazira, Chandrashekhar, Gulshan, Shahzadi, Dalpat, Nurjahan, Master Mohammed, Bismillah, Minoo Cooper, Agha | Action | Sunder Movies. Music: Baldev Naik; Lyrics: Chunilal Parekh |
| Vachan | Franz Osten | Devika Rani, Ashok Kumar, Mumtaz Ali, P. F. Pithawala, Balwant Singh, Maya Devi, Kamta Prasad, Mira, Agha Jani, Saroj Borkar, M. Nazir, Rajendranath | Costume Romantic Drama | Rajendranath's first film. Bombay Talkies. Music: Saraswati Devi; Lyrics: J. S. Kashyap |
| Vasant Bengali | Aspi Irani | Yashwant Dave, Husn Banu, Ghulam Rasool, Lakshmi, Asooji, Jumna, Sayed Ahmed | Costume | Imperial Film Company. Music: Ram Gopal Pande; Lyrics: Sahil Bilgrami |
| Vasanti | K. M. Multani | Naseem Banu, Navin Yagnik, Shanta Dutt, Putlibai, Sadiq Ali, Jamshedji, Khwaja Sabir, Ghulam Hussain, Abu Bakar | Social | Minerva Movietone. Music: Govindrao Tembe, Mir Sahib; Lyrics: Abdul Baqi |
| Veer Bala | Abdul Rehman Kabuli | Indurani, Pushparani, A. R. Kabuli, Shiraz, Sher Ali, Baburao Pehalwan, Dhirajlal, Firoza Begum, Azar Ansari, Vidya Devi, Garib Shah, Haroon | Devotional | Mohan Pictures. Music: Amulya Charan Biswas; Lyrics: A. R. Kabuli |
| Vijay Danka | Baburao Apte | Benjamin, Leela Chitnis, Putlibai, Gohar Karnataki, S. Nazir, Amritlal, Gulab, Khatoon, Amritlal Nagar | Action | Jay Bharat Music: Sagar Asif; Lyrics: G. S. Akhtar |
| Watan | Mehboob Khan | Kumar, Bibbo, Yakub, Maya Devi, Sitara Devi, Sankatha Prasad, Kayam Ali, Ramchandra, Agashe, Mirza, H. Siddiqi | Costume Drama | Sagar Pictures. Music: Anil Biswas; Lyrics: Wajahat Mirza |
| Yangrilla | M. D. Bhavnani | Enakshi Rama Rau, NayampallyI, David, S. L. Puri, Fatty Prasad, Sharifa, Rai Mohan | Action | Bhavnani Productions. Music: Badri Prasad; Lyrics: |
| Zamana | Ram Daryani | Nazir, Padma Devi, Hansa Wadkar, Jeevan, Majid, Vasant, Dar, Ameena, Bansi Karnataki, Gope, Gulab | Social | Krishna Movies. Music: Sunderdas Bhatia; Lyrics: D. N. Madhok |
