= Chaturbhuj Doshi =

Indian film writer and director

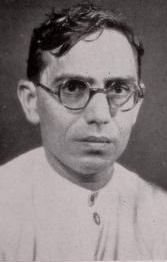
- From Filmindia September 1938
- Born: Chaturbhuj Anandji Doshi; 1894; Kathiawar, Gujarat, British India
- Died: 21 January 1969 (aged 74–75); Bombay, Maharashtra, India
- Occupations: Writer, director
- Years active: 1938–1958 (as director)

Chaturbhuj Doshi (1894–1969) was a Hindi and Gujarati writer-director of Indian cinema. He was one of the top Gujarati screenplay writers, who helped script stories for the Punatar productions. He is stated to be one of the leading figures who launched the Gujarati film industry with work on notable films like Gunsundari (1948) and Nanand Bhojai (1948). Doshi, was “well known” for his family socials and had become “a celebrity in his own right”. He made a name for himself as a journalist initially and was referred to as the "famous journalist" and publicist by Baburao Patel, editor of Filmindia.

His debut film as a director was Gorakh Aya (1938), produced by Ranjit Movietone, though he joined Ranjit in 1929, as a scriptwriter. In 1938, he directed another film for Ranjit, a social comedy, The Secretary, and both films were box-office successes for Doshi. His forte was socials, regularly adapting stories and novels for films. He worked initially on comedies like Secretary and Musafir (1940), but then "shifted to more significant films".

== Early life and career ==
Chaturbhuj Anandji Doshi was born in Kathiawar, Gujarat, British India. He was educated at the University of Bombay, and after graduation he started work as a journalist for a daily, Hindustan (1926), working for editor Indulal Yagnik. His entry into films was working as a scenarist in the silent era for directors like Jayant Desai, Nandlal Jaswantlal, and Nanubhai Vakil. He joined Ranjit Movietone in 1929, and wrote stories and screenplay for several of Ranjit films.

== Career ==
Gorakh Aya (Gorakh has come) in 1938, was the first film directed by Doshi. It was produced by Ranjit Movietone with screenplay by Gunvantrai Acharya and dialogues by P. L. Santoshi. The music, termed "good" was composed by Gyan Dutt. Baburao Patel's review in the September 1938 issue was favourable to the director "Directed by a man who enjoys a good reputation as a journalist… Mr. Chaturbhuj Doshi has given an excellent account of himself as a director considering that this is his very first effort", claiming it to be the "best picture coming out during the year from the Ranjit Studio".

The Secretary in 1938, was a "riotous comedy", starring Madhuri as a rich heiress in love with her secretary played by Trilok Kapoor. Charlie played the third angle causing friction, and was described as the "mainstay" of the film. The music was composed by Gyan Dutt, who became a regular in most of the films directed by Doshi.

Musafir in 1940 was a comedy costume drama, which had Charlie playing a prince who on his return finds his kingdom in disarray. Baburao Patel commended his acting in Filmindia, calling him "versatile" and "inimitable".

Bhakta Surdas, a devotional film directed by Doshi in 1942, is stated to be the "most famous" of the several versions made. It starred K. L. Saigal and Khursheed "the singing idol(s) of millions", winning "unprecedented popularity" everywhere.

Maheman (1942) starred Madhuri, Ishwarlal, Shamim and Mubarak. Music director Bulo C. Rani had come to Bombay in 1942, and joined Ranjit Studios assisting Khemchand Prakash in music direction. Prakash gave him a song to sing in Mehman, "Rootha Pyar Mein", which was "appreciated" and became a "popular number".

Doshi helped enormously in the development of the Gujarati cinema. During 1948-49 he directed three successful Gujarati films which "brought immense success to the industry". The success of the Gujarati film Kariyavar in 1948, directed by Chaturbhuj Doshi from a story by Shayda, called Vanzari Vaav, helped establish the Gujarati film industry along with other films like Vadilona Vanke (1948) by Ramchandra Thakur and Gadano Bel (1950) by Ratibhai Punatar. His next Gujarati film was Jesal Toral (1948) based on folklore, which proved a big box-office success. In 1949, Doshi directed another Gujarati film, Vevishal, an adaptation of Meghani's novel of the same name.

He also wrote stories, and one of his stories Pati Bhakti was used in the Tamil film En Kanawar (1948) produced by Ajit Pictures, which starred the Veena maestro, S. Balachander, who was also the debut director and music composer for the film.

== Death ==
Chaturbhuj Doshi died on 21 January 1969 in Bombay, Maharashtra, India.

== Filmography ==
List:

Year	Film	Cast	Composer	Studio/Producer
1938	Gorakh Aya (Gorakh Has Come)	Mazhar Khan, Trilok Kapoor, Kalyani, Rajkumari	Gyan Dutt	Ranjit Movietone
1938	The Secretary	Madhuri, Trilok Kapoor, Charlie, Kalyani, Wahidan, Rajkumari	Gyan Dutt	Ranjit Movietone
1939	Adhuri Kahani (Incomplete Story)	Durga Khote, Prithviraj Kapoor, Rose, Keshavrao Date, Ishwarlal	Gyan Dutt	Ranjit
1940	Musafir (Traveller)	Charlie, Khursheed, Ishwarlal, Vasanti, Yakub	Gyan Dutt	Ranjit
1941	Sasural (In-Laws)	Motilal, Madhuri, Nurjehan, Tarabai	Gyan Dutt	Ranjit
1941	Pardesi (Foreigner)	Motilal, Khursheed, Snehprabha, E. Bilimoria	Khemchand Prakash	Ranjit Movietone
1942	Maheman (The Guest)	Madhuri, Ishwarlal, Shamim, Rama Shukal, Mubarak	Khemchand Prakash	Ranjit Movietone
1942	Dhiraj (Patience)	Sitara Devi, Ishwarlal, Kesari, Nurjehan	Gyan Dutt	Ranjit
1942	Bhakta Surdas (Worshipper Surdas)	K. L. Saigal, Khursheed, Monica Desai, Nagendra	Gyan Dutt	Ranjit
1943	Shankar Parvati	Sadhana Bose, Aroon, Kamala Chatterjee, Brijmala.Bhagwandas	Gyan Dutt	Ranjit
1943	Chhoti Maa (The Nurse)	Khurshid, Aroon, Prabha, Anil Kumar	Gyan Dutt	Ranjit
1944	Bhartrahari	Surendra, Mumtaz Shanti, Kajjan, Aroon, Sulochana Chatterji, Yashwant Dave	Khemchand Prakash	Navin Pics
1945	Moorti (The Idol)	Motilal, Padma Banerjee, Khurshid, Yashwant Dave	Bulo C. Rani	Ranjit
1946	Phoolwari (The Bower)	Khursheed, Motilal, Dixit, Madhubala	Hansraj Behl	Ranjit
1947	Hothal Padmini			
1947	Kaun Hamara (Who's Ours?)	Roopa, Nihal, Dixit, Bipin Gupta	Bulo C. Rani	Ranjit
1947	Bela	Nigar Sultana, P. Jairaj, S. N. Tripathi, Krishna Kumari	Bulo C. Rani	Ranjit
1948	Sati Sone			
1948	Kariyavar (Dowry)	Dina Sanghvi, Dhulia, Shobha	Ajit Merchant	Sagar Movietone, based on the novel Vanzari Vaav by Shayda
1948	Jesal Toral	Rani Pramlata, Chhanalal, Chimanlal	Avinash Vyas	
1949	Vevishal (Engagement)	Ushakumari, Motibai, Mumtaz, Chandrarekha, Ghanshyam, Chandravadan Bhatt, Bhagwandas, Babaldas, Bhogilal, Vitthaldas	Mohan Jr., Ramesh Desai	Kirti Pictures, based on Jhaverchand Meghani's novel of same name
1949	Bhakta Puran (The Story Of Worshippers)			
1950	Ramtaram			
1950	Kis Ki Yaad (Remembrance)	Sulochana Chatterji, Bharat Bhushan, Jeevan, Paro, Veena	Hansraj Behl	Paro Art
1950	Akhand Saubhagya (Immortal Husband)			
1954	Aurat Teri Yehi Kahani (O Womankind, This is Your Story)	Nirupa Roy, Bharat Bhushan, Sulochana, Chandrashekhar	Bulo C. Rani	Bulo C. Rani, Ranjit Studios
1956	Dassehra	Nirupa Roy, Shahu Modak, Gajanan Jagirdar, Daisy Irani	N. Dutta	Navkala Niketan
1956	Aabroo	Kishore Kumar, Kamini Kaushal, Smriti Biswas, Madan Puri	Bulo C. Rani	Uma Chitra
1957	Shesh Naag	Shahu Modak, Nirupa Roy, Sulochana		Ajit Pictures
1957	Khuda Ka Banda (God's Beloved)	Chandrashekhar, Krishna Kumari, Tiwari, Gope, Kanhaiyalal	S. N. Tripathi	Chitra Bharti
1958	Sanskar (Culture)	Ameeta, Jayshree Gadkar, Anant Kumar, Yakub, Ranjana	Anil Biswas	Filmistan
