= Armaan (1942 film) =

1942 film

- Directed by: Kidar Sharma
- Written by: Kidar Sharma
- Produced by: Ranjit Studios
- Starring: Motilal; Shamim Bano; Nagendra Majumdar
- Cinematography: D. K. Ambre
- Music by: Gyan Dutt
- Release date: 1942
- Country: India
- Language: Hindi

Armaan (transl. Desire) also called Arman, is a Bollywood film. It was released in 1942. Arman was the first film that Kidar Sharma directed for Ranjit Studios and also his first in Bombay since his shift from Calcutta. The story, dialogue and lyrics were also by Sharma. It had music by Gyan Dutt. The cinematographer was D. K. Ambre. The cast included Motilal, Shamim, Nagendra Majumdar, Bhagwandas, and Rajkumari.

The story was a romantic melodrama involving a young rich man who loses his eyesight and is unable to recognise the girl he loves, who helps restore his sight.

== Plot ==
Kanwar Sahib (Motilal) speeds up on his way to meet the famous artist Vyas (Nagendra Majumdar) staying in the village. On the way he passes the artist's daughter Meera, but doesn't see her. Meera sees him and falls in love with him. Vyas lives in a village with Meera and paints pictures and draws murals to earn a living. Having contracted Vyas to paint murals in his house, Kanwar returns to his mansion. His father is a lordly landowner, whose relative-cum Diwan tries to exploit him of his riches. Kanwar is interested in scientific work trying to produce a ray that would be able to register pain and pleasure in the brain. The experiment goes badly and Kanwar becomes blind. Vyas and his daughter arrive at the mansion and soon Meera and the blind Kanwar fall in love with each other. The Diwan is unhappy to see the romance between the two and gets Kanwar's father to have Meera sent away. This sends her father into grief and he kills himself.

Meera meets a sadhu who tells her he will make her a herbal cure for Kanwar's eyes but she has to submit to him. When the medicine is completed Meera tries to run away with it but the sage stops her and tries to molest her. Meera then kills him and gets to Kanwar's house where she is stopped by the Diwan and a dancing girl. They snatch the cure from her and give it to Kanwar whose sight is restored. However he is unable to recognise Meera, who is arrested for the murder of the sadhu. When Kanwar hears Meera speak, he at once knows it's Meera. The lovers are united with the villainous Diwan getting his due.

== Cast ==
- Motilal as Kanwar Sahib
- Shamim Bano as Meera
- Nagendra Majumdar s Vyas, Meera's father
- Bhagwandas as the Diwan Sahib
- Rajendra Singh
- Meera
- Rajkumari
- A. Shah
- Bhupatrai
- Nazir Bedi

== Review ==
Baburao Patel in his October 1942 review of the film in Filmindia stated "while failing to provide mass entertainment, still helps to provoke plenty of thought all throughout its pretty long footage". He then proceeds to point out several inconsistencies in the story, like: the villagers never seeing a car; an artist known all over has never stepped out of his village "how does he then earn a livelihood in that village by painting portraits"; and the insignificance of experiment, and the pain and pleasure ray. "Kedar Sharma should have, however, been a bit more logical and careful about his shooting script". Nagendra Majumdar's acting as the painter Vyas was commended, calling it "the best performance" among the artists. Nagendra had shifted to doing character roles after having earlier directed films (Filmindia June 1942).

Sharma had changed the images of the actresses he worked with bringing them into the mainstream cinema, as with Ramola in Dil Hi Toh Hai/Aulad (1939) and Mehtab in Chitralekha (1941). He did the same with Shamim in Arman.

The film went on to become a box office success commercially, providing Motilal with "back to back hits" with his other films like Sasural (1941), Pardesi (1941) and Taqdeer (1943).

== Soundtrack ==
The music was composed by Gyan Dutt, with lyrics by Kidar Sharma. The singers were Shamim and Rajkumari.

=== Song list ===
#	Title	Singer
1	"Dil Ki Duniya Jo Luta Di Tere Diwane Ne"	Shamim
2	"Kabutar Sandesa Liye Aa Rahe Hain"	Shamim
3	"Lao To Zara Dil Ko Ise Dil Me Chipaun"	Shamim
4	"Mira Ke Mann Me Baso Muralidhar Ghanshyam"	Shamim
5	"Nainan Me Andhiyara"	
6	"Raat Suhani Aao Gaiyi"	Shamim
7	"Rum Jhum Kar Aaye Badal"	
8	"Nainan Me Andhiyara"	
9	"Wo Kaun Hai Jo Leta Hai Chutkiya Jigar Me"	Rajkumari
10	"Sakhiya Jal Bharne Aati Hai"	
