= Jesal Toral (1948 film) =

- Directed by: Chaturbhuj Doshi
- Written by: Prafull Desai
- Based on: Folklore of Jesal Toral
- Produced by: P. B. Zaveri
- Starring: Rani Premlata; Chhanalal; Chimanlal; Anjana
- Music by: Avinash Vyas (composition)
- Production company: Kirti Pictures
- Release date: 1948
- Country: India
- Language: Gujarati

Jesal Toral is a 1948 Indian Gujarati devotional film written and directed by Chaturbhuj Doshi.

== Cast ==
The cast is as follows:

- Rani Premlata
- Chhanalal
- Chimanlal
- Anjana
- Shyam
- Jhaverbhai
- Gangaram
- Daksha
- Bakulesh Pandit
- Pramil
- Mulchand Khichdi

== Production ==
The film was produced in black-and-white by P. B. Zaveri's Kirti Pictures. It was directed by Chaturbhuj Doshi while story and dialogues were written by Prafull Desai.

The film is based on local folk legend of bandit Jesal Jadeja who was preached and reformed by Kathi saint-woman Toral. Their memorial shrines are located in Anjar in Kutch district, Gujarat.

== Soundtrack ==
The music was composed by Avinash Vyas and lyrics were written by Prafull Desai. It has 10 songs sung by Chandrakala, Ratikumar Vyas, Amirbai Karnataki and A. R. Oza.

All lyrics are written by Prafull Desai; all music is composed by Avinash Vyas

Track listing
No.	Title	Singer(s)	Length
1.	"Paap Taru Prakash"	Amirbai Karnataki, Ratikumar Vyas	7:22
2.	"Are Tame Vishwasi"	A. R. Oza, Ratikumar Vyas, Chandrakala	3:14
3.	"Pachhali Te Raat Na Sonala Satave"	Chandrakala	2:58

== Reception ==
The film was a major commercial success.
