= D. N. Madhok =

Indian lyricist (1902–1982)

Dina Nath Madhok
- Born: Dina Nath Madhok; 22 October 1902; Gujranwala, Punjab, British India (now Punjab, Pakistan)
- Died: 9 July 1982 (aged 79); Hyderabad, Andhra Pradesh, India
- Occupations: Lyricist, film director, screenplay writer, composer, dialogue writer
- Years active: 1932–1969

Dina Nath Madhok (22 October 1902 – 9 July 1982) was a prominent lyricist of Bollywood in the 1940s to 1960s.

He started his career with the 1932 film Radhey Sham. He wrote over 800 songs in his career spanning four decades and was regarded as one of the top lyricists in the 1940s, earning himself the soubriquet "Mahakavi Madhok". Madhok is cited as one of the three "First Generation" of lyricists (1930s to 1950s) along with Kidar Sharma and Kavi Pradeep.

Apart from writing lyrics, he wrote screenplays and directed films. He directed almost 17 films like Baghdad Ka Chor (1934), Mirza Sahiban (1939), Bilwamangal (1954) and the Madhubala-starrer Naata (1955).

== Early life and education ==
Dina Nath Madhok was born on 22 October 1902 in Gujranwala, Punjab, British India (present day Pakistan) in a middle-class family. His father was a first class post master. Madhok was unable to pass his B.A. exams but worked in the Indian Railways for several years.

== Career ==
Madhok arrived in Bombay in 1931. The next year, he debuted in Bollywood writing lyrics for the film Radhey Shyam. He wrote 29 songs in that film along with writing the screenplay and acting in a small role. He helped in composing songs in the film though he remained uncredited. The same year, he directed 3 films, Lure of Gold, Flame of Love and Three Warriors. In 1933, he directed and wrote lyrics for Khoobsurat Bala. The next three years, he directed, wrote screenplay and dialogue for several films, but did not write any lyrics. In 1937, he wrote lyrics for two films Lahori Lutera and Dilfarosh, which had been released as Three Warriors in 1933. He directed Hindi and Punjabi films also during these years.

He joined Ranjit Movietone in 1939. His career as a lyricist took off with several major successes. He wrote lyrics for popular songs in the 1940s and 1950s for films such as Nadi Kinare (1939), Musafir (1940), Pagal (1940), Ummeed (1941), Bansari (1943), Nurse (1943), Bela (1947), Bhakt Surdas (1942), and Tansen (1943). The last two films' songs are still popular to these days. Tansen's two songs "Barso Re" sung by Khursheed and "Diya Jalao" sung by K. L. Saigal, with lyrics by Madhok are cited in the 15 'recommended songs' of 1940–49.

According to Bhaichand Patel, he wrote songs "that were simple yet had universal appeal". Madhok was instrumental in introducing the famous composer Naushad to Bollywood. He appointed Naushad as an assistant music director in his directorial venture, a Punjabi film Mirza Sahiban (1939). The first film which Naushad composed as an independent music director was Prem Nagar' (1940). This time also it was Madhok who penned the lyrics for the songs of that film. Some other notable soundtracks, that he contributed to as a lyricist are Lagan (1938), Pyaas (1941), Zameendaar (1942), Zabaan (1943), Daasi (1944), Preet, Dhamaki (1945), Anjuman, Kaajal (1948), Sunhere Din (1949), Khiladi, Anmol Ratan (1950), Rasiya (1950), Goonj (1952), Dard-e-Dil (1953), Majboori (1954), Oot Patang (1955), Makkhichoos (1956), Maharani Padmini (1964), Tasveer (1966) Samay Bada Balwan (1969). He gradually disassociated himself with the Hindi film Industry as other younger talented lyricists emerged in India in the 1950s.

== Collaborations ==
Madhok was credited for bringing Naushad Ali to Bollywood. He penned lyrics for Naushad's first film Prem Nagar. After that they worked together in many films with successful contribution to Indian Cinema. Their pairing culminated in Rattan (1944), which was a big success at the box-office, especially for its music.

He worked with almost every prominent music director of the forties and fifties such as Gyan Dutt, N. R. Bhattacharya, Khemchand Prakash, S. N. Tripathi, Bulo C Rani, Naushad, Khurshid Anwar, Pandit Amarnath, Sardul Kwatra, Anil Biswas, R. C. Boral, Robin Chatterjee, Sunder Das, Rasheed Attre, C. Ramchandra, Sajjad Hussain, Ghulam Haider, Vinod, Gobind Ram, Husnlal Bhagatram, A. R. Qureshi, Roshan, Sardar Malik, Ghulam Mohammad, and Hansraj Behl.

== Death ==
Dina Nath Madhok died in Hyderabad, Andhra Pradesh on 9 July 1982 at age 79.

== Filmography ==
=== As lyricist ===
Selected films.

- Radhe Shyam (1932): lyricist and Acting Punjabi movie made in Lahore -Released on the Friday, 2 September 1932 under the Film Company Kamla Movietone
- Khubsurat Bala (1933)
- Jwalamukhi (1936)
- Aladdin Aur Jadui Chirag (1937)
- Dilfarosh (1937)
- Shama Parwana (1937
- Zamana (1938)
- Nadi Kinare (1939)
- Aaj Ka Hindustan (1940)
- Diwali (1940)
- Musafir (1940)
- Pagal (1940)
- Prem Nagar (1940)
- Dhandora (1941)
- Kurmai Punjabi movie released under the Film Company (Nishat Productions )

Released on 29,08,1941

- Pardesi (1941)
- Sasural (1941)
- Shaadi (1941)
- Ummeed (1941)
- Bhakta Surdas (1942)
- Jhankar (1942)
- Khandan (1942)
- Maheman (1942)
- Vasantsena (1942)
- Zamindar (1942)
- Zevar (1942)
- Bansari (1943)
- Bhaktaraj (1943)
- Ishara (1943)
- Kanoon (1943)
- Sanjog (1943) Screenplay, Songs and Dialogues
- Tansen (1943)
- Dassi (1944)
- Geet (1944)
- Ratan (1944)
- Pehle Aap (1944)
- Shirin Farhad (1945)
- Insaaf (1946)
- Bela (1947)
- Parwana (1947)
- Lal Dupatta (1948)
- Nao (1948)
- Singaar (1949)
- Sunhere Din (1949)
- Anmol Ratan (1950)
- Khiladi (1950)
- Sabak (1950)
- Tarana (1951)
- Goonj (1952)
- Dard-e-Dil (1953)
- Bilwamangal (1954)
- Ehsan (1954)
- Oot Patang (1955)
- Aabroo (1956)
- Dhake Ki Malmal (1956)
- Makhee Choos (1956)
- Jeevan Sathi (1957)
- Maharani Padmini (1964)
- Satluj De Kandhe story only (1964) (Punjabi Movie)
- Janam Janam Ke Sathi (1965)
- Tasveer (1966)
- Samay Bada Balwan (1969)

=== As director ===
- Dilfarosh a.k.a. Three Warriors (1932)
- Sharafi Loot a.k.a. Lure of Gold (1932)
- Flame of Love (1932)
- Khubsurat Bala (1934)
- Watan Parasta (1934)
- Master Fakir (1934)
- Diwani (1934)
- Baghdad Ka Chor (1934)
- Jwalamukhi (1936)
- Dil Ka Daku (1936)
- Sharafi Loot (1937)
- Shama Parwana (1937)
- Dil Farosh (1937)
- Sneh Lagna (1938)
- Mirza Sahiban (1939) Punjabi movie
- Nao (1948)
- Khamosh Sipahi (1950)
- Bilwamangal (1954)
- Naata (1955)
