= Kariyavar =

- Directed by: Chaturbhuj Doshi
- Written by: Shayda, Chaturbhuj Doshi
- Based on: Vanzari Vaav by Shayda
- Produced by: Chimanlal Desai
- Starring: Dina Sanghvi
- Cinematography: Adi Irani, Jayant Dadawala
- Music by: Ajit Merchant
- Production company: Sagar Movietone
- Release date: 1948
- Running time: 138 minute
- Country: India
- Language: Gujarati

Kariyavar is 1948 Indian Gujarati film written and directed by Chaturbhuj Doshi. It was produced by Chimanlal Desai under banner of Sagar Movietone. It was based on the story by Shayda which itself was based on a folklore of a stepwell. The soundtrack was composed by Ajit Merchant.

== Plot ==
In a village, there was a challenge that whoever reach into a pot housing a venomous cobra would have the privilege of installing an idol in a temple. A village girl Raju accepts and succeeds in the challenge. The cobra forms a bond with Raju and also grants her wish that he will protect her whenever she needs. Madhav, a son of gypsy Balam Vanzara, falls in love with Raju, while Champa, Vanzara's adoptive daughter, falls in love with Veera, Raju's malevolent neighbour who harbors envy for Madhav. Madhav was bitten by the cobra while he went to watch Raju's dance performance. Raju uses the previously granted wish so the cobra retracts its venom, stipulating that a stepwell must be dug in the village. Meanwhile, Raju and Madhav get married. Seeking vengeance, Veera shows the wrong place to dig the stepwell resulting in a dry well. The village suffering from the drought is manipulated by Veera to demand a sacrificial exorcism involving newly married couple of Raju and Madhav to rise the water in the stepwell. Champa decides to marry Veera as well as agrees to sacrifice herself. Finally the sacrifice of Champa and Veera results in the miraculous rising of well waters, resolving the village's problem.

== Cast ==
- Dina Sanghvi as Raju
- Dhulia
- Shobha
- Mulchand Khichdi
- Manhar Desai
- Chhanalal
- Urmila
- Kusum Thakur
- Kamlakant
- Shyamabai
- Narendra Desai

== Production ==
The story of the film was based on Shayda's novel Vanzari Vaav which was based on a folklore. The black-and-white film was produced by Chimanlal Desai under banner of Sagar Movietone while script, dialogues and direction was by Chaturbhuj Doshi. It features a rural, folkloric, mythological story. The love story in the film is complex and contains numerous symbolic allusions with clear sexual undertones.

It is known for debut film of Dina Sanghvi who is also known as Dina Pathak.

== Soundtrack ==
The music was composed by Ajit Merchant while the lyrics were written by Chaitanya and Nandkumar Pathak.

Kariyavar

Soundtrack album by Ajit Merchant
- Released: 1948
- Genre: Feature film soundtrack
- Language: Gujarati
- Producer: Sagar Movietone

All lyrics are written by Chaitanya, Nandkumar Pathak.; all music is composed by Ajit Merchant.

Track listing
No.	Title	Singer(s)	Length
1.	"Mane Marya Nenana Baan"	Geeta Dutt	3:10
2.	"Gori Zaza Na Rahiye Gumanman"	Geeta Dutt, Mukesh	3:23
3.	"Aave Ne Jaye"	Meena Kapoor	3:20
4.	"Bholi Ne Bharamavi"	Geeta Dutt	3:01
5.	"Gokuliyun Gaam Nanun"	Geeta Dutt, Suman Banavalkar	3:13
6.	"He Man Bhooleli"	Meena Kapoor	3:12
7.	"Kesudani Kaliye"	Ajit Merchant, Meena Kapoor	3:02
8.	"Mare Sapana Ne Mandvade"	Geeta Dutt	3:10
9.	"Vanzarare"	Ajit Merchant, Meena Kapoor	3:15

== See also ==
- List of Gujarati films
