= Dhiraj (disambiguation) =

Dhiraj may refer to:

- Dhiraj Bommadevara (born 2001) Indian archer
- Dhiraj Deshmukh (born 1980) Indian politician
- Dhiraj a Bollywood social film
