= Khursheed Bano =

Pakistani singer and actress (1914–2001)

Khursheed Begum
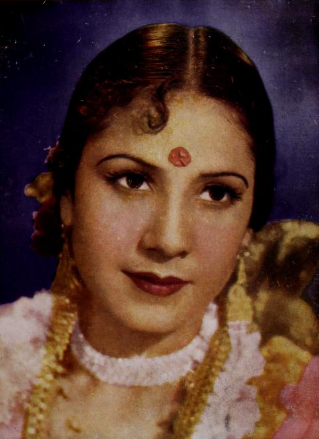
- Khurshid in Holi (1940)
- Born: Irshad Begum; 14 April 1914; Lahore,(British India), now in Pakistan
- Died: 18 April 2001 (aged 87); Karachi, Sindh, Pakistan
- Other name: Khursheed or Khurshid
- Occupations: Actress; Playback singer; Singer
- Years active: 1931 – 1956
- Spouse: Lala Yakub (m. 1949; div. 1956) (Note: Different from Indian actor Yakub) Yusuf Bhai Mian (m. 1956–2001)
- Children: 3

Khursheed Bano (14 April 1914 – 18 April 2001), often credited as Khursheed or Khurshid, was a singer and actress, and a pioneer of the Indian cinema. Her career ran through the 1930s and 1940s, before she migrated to Pakistan in 1948.

Making her debut with Laila Majnu (1931), she acted in over thirty films in India. She is best known for her film Tansen (1943) with actor-singer K. L. Saigal, which featured many of her memorable songs.

== Early life ==
Khursheed was born on 14 April 1914 as Irshad Begum in Lahore, in what was then British India. As a child, she lived in the Bhati Gate area next to Allama Iqbal's house.

== Career ==
Khursheed started her film career with early talkies when she joined Madan Theatres in Calcutta in 1931.

She also worked in the silent film Eye for an Eye (1931) the year when the first talkie film (Alam Ara) of the subcontinent was released. This was the heyday of the fledging movie industry in Lahore. Khursheed joined the Hindmata Cinetone Film Company and under this banner she appeared in Ishq-e-Punjab alias Mirza Sahiban (1935), the first Punjabi talkie film. In the same year, she took the lead role opposite Prithiviraj Kapoor along with Imrozia Begum in National Movietone's Swarg Ki Seedhi (1935) and received huge acclaim for her performance. She soon moved to Bombay and after working in Mahalakshmi Cinetone Company's Bombshell and Chirag-e-Husn (both 1935). The same year, she acted in Saroj Movietone's Gaibi Sitara, where she also sang all the songs. Sadly no record of these songs has survived.

Some of her films released during this phase were Laila Majnu (1931), Muflis Aashiq (1932), Naqlee Doctor (1933), Bomb Shell and Mirza Sahiban (1935), Kimiagar (1936), Iman Farosh (1937), Madhur Milan (1938) and Sitara (1939).

During 1931 and 1942, she acted in films made by the studios in Calcutta and Lahore but though recognised as a singer actress, the films did not make an impact. Some of her films in the 1940s were Musafir (1940), Holi (1940) ("Bhigoi Moree Saree Ray"), Shadi (1941) ("Hari ke Goon Prabhu ke Goon gavun mein" and "Ghir Ghir Aaye Baderia"), Pardesi (1941) ("Pahley Jo Mohabbat Sey Inkaar Kia Hota" and "Mori Ateria Hai Sooni"). In Bhakta Surdas (1942), "Panchee Bawra", whose composer was Gyan Dutt became a very famous song of the 1940s. The other popular songs from the same film are "Madhur Madhur Ga Ray Manwa", "Jholee Bhar Taray Laday Ray', and a duet "Chandni Raat Aur Taray Khilay Haun" with K. L. Saigal.

Her peak period came when she moved to Bombay to act in Ranjit Movietone films with actors like K. L. Saigal and Motilal. She achieved immense popularity when she acted opposite the famous singer-actor K. L. Saigal in the Chaturbhuj Doshi directed, Bhukt Surdas (1942), followed by Tansen (1943) and was referred to as the "first of the singing stars". Her other two main lead stars were Jairaj, and Ishwarlal.

She acted in Nurse ("Koyalia Kahay Bolay Ree") in 1943. Tansen (1943), with music composed by Khemchand Prakash, was also a high point in her acting career. Her famous songs included "Barso Re", "Ghata Ghan Ghor Ghor", "Dukhia Jiara", "Ab Raja Bhae Moray Balam", and a duet, "Moray Bala Pun Kay Sathee Chela", with K. L. Saigal.

Bano with Madhubala (below) in Mumtaz Mahal (1944)

Her other famous films are: Mumtaz Mahal (1944) ("Jo Hum Pay Guzarti Hai", "Dil Kee Dharkan Bana Liya"), Shahenshah Babar (1944) ("Mohabbat Mein Sara Jahan Jal Raha Hai", "Bulbul Aa Tu Bhi Ga"), Prabhu ka Ghar opposite Trilok Kapoor and Moorti (1945) ("Ambwa Pay Koyal Boley", "Baderia Baras Gayee Uss Paar") with music composition by Bulo C. Rani, Mitti (1947) ("Chhaai Kali Ghata More Balam") in 1947 and Aap Beeti (1948) ("Meri Bintee Suno Bhagwan").

== Migration to Pakistan ==
Her last film in India was Papeeha Re (1948), which was a great hit, prior to her migration to Pakistan, leaving her mark in the Indian film industry. Khursheed migrated, in 1948, to Pakistan after the independence, with her husband and settled down in Karachi, Sindh, Pakistan.

She worked in two films in 1956, Fankar and Mandi. Mandi was notable because of Khursheed and music composer Rafiq Ghaznavi, but because of poor handling of the film, the film was not a success at the box office. The second film Fankar, produced by Robert Malik, a physics teacher at Saint Paul's English High School, in Karachi suffered the same fate.

== Personal life ==
Khursheed married her manager Lala Yakub (not to be confused with the famous Indian actor Yakub), who was a small-time actor with Kardar Productions and member of the Bhati Gate Group, Lahore, Pakistan. Due to personal problems, she divorced Yakub in 1956. She married Yusuf Bhai Mian in 1956, who was in the shipping business. She had three children and had stopped working in films after her last film in 1956.

== Death ==
Khursheed Bano died on 18 April 2001 in Karachi, Pakistan four days after her 87th birthday.

== Filmography ==
=== Films in India ===
- Laila Majnu (as Shehla) (1931) (her debut film)
- Muflis Ashiq (1932)
- Hatili Dulhan (1931)
- Chatra Bakavali (1932)
- Radhe Shyam (1932)
- Nakli Doctor (1933)
- Mirza Sahiban (as Khursheed) (1934)
- Aankh Ka Nasha (as Shehla) (1933)
- Swarg Ki Sidhi (as Khursheed) (1935)
- Bombshell (as Khursheed) (1935)
- Sipah Salar (1936)
- Piya Ki Jogan (as Shahla) (1936)
- Kimiagar (1936)
- Ailane Jung (1936)
- Sitara (1938)
- Prem Samadhi (1938)
- Madhur Milan (1938)
- The Daughters of India (1939)
- Kaun Kisi ka (1939)
- Aap Ki Marzi (1939)
- Musafir (1940)
- Holi (1940)
- Shaadi (1941)
- Pardesi (1941)
- Beti (1941)
- Choti Ma
- Chandni (1942)
- Bhakta Surdas (1942)
- Tansen (1943)
- Dr. Kumar (1944)
- Shahenshah Babar (1944)
- Mumtaz Mahal (1944)
- Prabhu Ka Ghar (1945)
- Moorti (1945)
- Devar (1946)
- Phoolwari (1946)
- Manjhdhar (1947)
- Rangeen Kahani (1947)
- Mitti (1947)
- Aage Badho (1947)
- Aap Beeti (1948)
- Papiha Re (1948)

=== Films in Pakistan ===
Year	Film	Language
1956	Mandi	Urdu
1956	Fankar	Urdu
