= Narsinh Mehta (film) =

1932 film

- Film poster
- Directed by: Nanubhai Vakil
- Written by: Chaturbhuj Doshi
- Based on: Narsinh Mehta
- Produced by: Chimanbhai Desai
- Starring: Master Manhar, Umakant Desai, Mehtab
- Cinematography: Faredoon Irani
- Music by: S. P. Rane
- Production company: Sagar Movietone
- Release date: 7 April 1932
- Running time: 139 minutes
- Country: India
- Language: Gujarati

Narsinh Mehta (Gujarati: નરસિંહ મહેતા) is a 1932 Gujarati biographical film directed by Nanubhai Vakil. It was the first Gujarati talkie film.

== Plot ==
The film is based on the life of the saint-poet Narsinh Mehta.

== Cast ==
The cast was:

- Marutirao as Narsinh Mehta
- Umakant Desai as Krishna
- Mohan Lala as Ra Mandlik
- Khatun as Kunwarbai
- Master Bachu as Kunwarbai's husband
- Miss Jamna as Manekbai
- Miss Mehtab as Rukmini

Master Manhar, Trikam Das and Miss Devi appeared in other roles.

== Production ==
The film produced in 15 days at the cost of ₹17,000 (equivalent to ₹5.2 million or US$54,000 in 2023). The sets were designed by Ravishankar Raval.

== Soundtrack ==
Total 15 songs are in the film. The music was composed by S. P. Rane while Mulraj Kapadia served as an assistant musician. The soundtrack is as follows:

Narsinh Mehta

Soundtrack album
- Released: 1932
- Genre: Feature film soundtrack
- Language: Gujarati

Track listing
No.	Title	Length
1.	"Pragat Thashe Purush Shreshth Gurjarine Khole"
2.	"Kan Khelto Bansi Dhun"
3.	"Oshiyala Avata amaro..."
4.	"Sukhdukh Manma Na Aanie Re"
5.	"Aapya Thaki Kadi Koina Khajana"
6.	"Harini Bhakti Vina Je Jive"
7.	"Parameshvare Banavya Saune Ek j Sarkha"
8.	"Mamata Saghali Melo Re, Maya Saghali"
9.	"Krishna Krihsna Sau Kaho Re Bhaio"
10.	"Mari Hundi Svikaro Maharaj Re..."
11.	"Bhar tu Ange Ang Umang"
12.	"Lakho Aafat Chho PAde Ma Koini"
13.	"Viththalvar Varsavo Varasad Prithvi"
14.	"Pidhi Pyali Ane Duniya Badhi"
15.	"Karo Karm Nishkam Tyaji Do"

== Release ==
The film was released on 9 April 1932 in West End Cinema (later Naaz Cinema) in Bombay.

== Reception ==
The film was successful and was followed by release of the film Sati Savitri in same genre.

According to Anandshankar Dhruv, the film adhered to a Gandhian interpretation of Narsinh Mehta. The film was devoid of miracles associated with him.

== See also ==
- List of Gujarati films
