= Gorakh Aya =

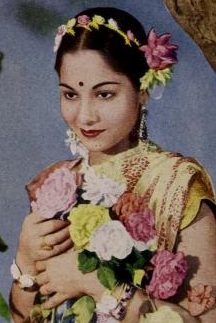
- Rajkumari in a still from Gorakh Aya
- Directed by: Chaturbhuj Doshi
- Produced by: Chandulal Shah
- Starring: Rajkumari; Trilok Kapoor; Mazhar Khan; Ila Devi
- Cinematography: Krishna Gopal
- Music by: Gyan Dutt
- Distributed by: Ranjit Movietone
- Release date: 1938
- Running time: 120 minutes
- Country: India
- Language: Hindi

Gorakh Aya (Gorakh Has Come) is a 1938 Hindi mythology film from Ranjit Movietone. It was the debut directorial venture for Chaturbhuj Doshi, who had made a name for himself as a journalist and publicist. The screenplay was by Gunvantrai Acharya, with dialogues by Pyare Lal Santoshi. The cinematographer was Krishna gopal and music was composed by Gyan Dutt.

The film starred Rajkumari, Mazhar Khan, Trilok Kapoor, and Kalyani in the lead roles. The film was also Rajkumari's debut as a playback singer.

The story based on the legend of Machhindra and his disciple Gorakh, involves Machhindra's retreat to the Himalayas for meditation. His belief that women are to blame for all troubles divides the Indian Kingdom into two armies, one run by Tilottama, leading the women's army and another, an all-male army, led by Machhindra himself.

== Synopsis ==
Machchindra (Mazhar Khan) leaves the monastery after he witnesses excesses at the temple. He goes for meditation to the Himalayas for a period of seven years and comes to the conclusion that women are responsible for the problems facing mankind. His thinking becomes pervasive all over India. Meanwhile, the Egyptian Queen plans to raid India, setting up her camp by the Indus river. A Rishi's daughter in the nearby forest, becomes influenced by the power the Queen wields and sets up a woman's army of her own to fight the invading army. India gets divided into two sets of armies, one, the women's army, led by Tilottama and the second, all-male, led by Machchindra who has by now defeated the invaders with the help of his army. The story continues with the meeting of Machchindra and Tillottama, with both falling in love. Ultimately Machchindra's disciple Gorakhnath comes and helps him return to his spiritual path.

== Cast ==
- Rajkumari as Tilottamma
- Mazhar Khan as Machhindra
- Trilok Kapoor as Gorakhnath, Machhindra's disciple
- Kalyani as Vish Kanya
- Ila Devi
- Ram Apte
- Bhagwandas

== Review ==
The film was released on 30 July 1938 at West End theatre, Bombay. According to Baburao Patel in his review of the film in the September 1938 issue of Filmindia, "Drastic editing" was required to improve the film. The photography was stated to be "too beautiful in places" as were the trick shots, but the cinematographer was cautioned to handle the outdoor photography better. Use of an art director would have helped keep "in composition and angle selection". The dialogues were good as was the music, which was "cleverly mixed". The direction was praised: "Chaturbhuj Doshi has given an excellent account of himself as a director considering that this is his very first effort". The publicity, by having the opening day limited only to women was commended. The box-office verdict as stated by Patel was "Plenty of entertainment with a popular plot makes the picture a great box office possibility". The film was reported to be drawing large crowds in later sections of the magazine.

== Soundtrack ==
The music direction was by Gyan Dutt, with lyrics by Pyarelal Santoshi. The film was also Rajkumari's debut as a playback singer. She shifted from acting to playback singing full-time singing for nearly a hundred films. The singers were Rajkumari, Kantilal, Ram Apte, E. G. Pargaonkar and Kalyani Das.

=== Song list ===
#	Title	Singer
1	"Aisi Nagariya Jaana Humko"	Rajkumari, Kantilal, Ram Apte
2	"Ek Bhool Se Kya Hota Hai"	E. G. Pargaonkar
3	"Gaati Hoon Mujhko Gaana Hai Gaana"	Rajkumari
4	"Kya Kya Ban Kar Aaoon Uthein Umange Man Mein Kitni"	Rajkumari
5	"Le Chal Re Piya Apne Nagar Mein"	Rajkumari
6	"Main Chhoti Si Pyali Mein Madira Ki Pyali"	
7	"Mai Itni Pila De"	
8	"Tum Ho Raja Mere Man Ke Saathi"	Rajkumari
9	"Woh Din Gaye Hamare Main Thi Chhai Chhabili Radha"	Rajkumari, Kalyani Das
10	"Alakh Niranjan Alakh Niranjan Bolo Milkar"	
11	"Chal Re Chal Re Chal Jeevan Kheti"	
12	"Jaanewala Jaa Kar Rahega"	
13	"Jis Nagri Ki Raah Na Jaane Us Nagri Kyun Jaata Hai"	
14	"Maya Ki Chhayi Andhiyari"	
