= Phoolwari =

1946 film by Chaturbhuj Doshi

- Poster
- Directed by: Chaturbhuj Doshi
- Written by: Pandit Indra (dialogues)
- Screenplay by: Chaturbhuj Doshi
- Story by: Chaturbhuj Doshi
- Produced by: Ranjit Studios
- Starring: Motilal; Khursheed; Madhubala; Dixit
- Cinematography: D. C. Mehta
- Edited by: B. C. Vyas
- Music by: Hansraj Behl
- Distributed by: Ranjit Studios
- Release date: 1946
- Country: India
- Language: Hindi

Phoolwari (transl. Flower Garden) is a 1946 Indian Hindi-language romantic drama film directed by Chaturbhuj Doshi for Ranjit Studios.

The film starred Motilal and Khursheed in lead roles, with Madhubala and Dixit appearing in supporting roles.

Its music was composed by Hansraj Behl, while the lyricist was Pandit Indra.

Phoolwari, a critical and commercial success, is cited to be one of the most successful and important films of Motilal. It is considered lost today.

== Cast ==
- Motilal
- Khursheed
- Madhubala (as Baby Mumtaz)
- Dixit
- Nazir Begum
- Tiwari

== Production ==
Phoolwari began filming in October 1945 and was completed by February 1946. It was Madhubala's fourth film under Ranjit Movietone and overall fifth film as a child artist (Madhubala as Baby Mumtaz).

== Soundtrack ==
The film's music was composed by Hansraj Behl with lyrics by Pandit Indra. The singers included Khursheed, Baby Anu, Mohantara Talpade, and Hamida Banu.

=== Songlist ===
| # | Title | Singer |
|---|---|---|
| 1 | "Chand Mama Ne Amrood Churaya Re" | Baby Anu |
| 2 | "Hawa Chalein Saayein Saayein" | Mohantara Talpade |
| 3 | "Khilona Tera Toota Re" | |
| 4 | "Lat Uljhi Suljha Ja Baalam" | |
| 5 | "Tumhe Nainon Mein" | |
| 6 | "Kya Piya Milan Ki Baat" | Khursheed Bano |
| 7 | "Oonchi Haveli Bana Do" | Mohantara Talpade, Hamida Banu |
| 8 | "Main Toh Girdhar Ke Sang Nachoongi" | |

== Box office ==
Phoolwari was a critical and commercial success. Box office India reported that the film grossed ₹40 lakhs at the box office to emerge as the third highest-grossing film of 1946, with a verdict of "hit".
