= Vevishal =

- Directed by: Chaturbhuj Doshi
- Written by: Chaturbhuj Doshi (screenplay, dialogues)
- Based on: Vevishal by Jhaverchand Meghani
- Produced by: P. B. Zaveri
- Starring
- Music by: Mohan Junior, Ramesh Desai
- Production company: Kirti Pictures
- Release date: 1949
- Country: India
- Language: Gujarati

Vevishal is 1949 Indian Gujarati social drama film directed and scripted by Chaturbhuj Doshi. It was based on Jhaverchand Meghani's popular Gujarati social novel Vevishal. It was produced by P. B. Zaveri under the banner of Kirti Pictures.

== Plot ==
Champshibhai and Deepchand, belonging to merchant families, agrees for marriage of their children in future. Deepchand settles in village with his family while Champshibhai goes to Mumbai and becomes rich and changed his name to Champak Sheth. Champak Sheth feels humiliated to marry his daughter Sushila to Deepchand's son Sukhlal. Champak Sheth's elder family head Bhabhuma does not like his behavioral change. Deepchand sends Sukhlal to Mumbai to study and settle where he meets Sushila and both fall in love. Champak Sheth plans to marry Sushila to wealthy thug Vijaychandra for sake of money. He makes Sukhlal overwork which results in ill health. Sushila comes closer to Sukhlal while treating him of his illness. Champak Sheth scares and threatens Deepchand and shows him fake medical certificates proving impotency of Sukhlal. Sukhlal leaves the job and decides to earn himself and marry Sushila only. In the end, Bhabhuma steps in and helps Sukhlal marry Sushila.

== Cast ==
Most of the actors belonged to old Gujarati theatre. The principal cast is as follows:

- Ushakumari
- Motibai
- Mumtaz
- Chandrarekha
- Ghanshyam
- Chandravadan Bhatt
- Bhagwandas, Babaldas
- Bhogilal
- Vitthaldas

Other cast included Adi Irani, Datta Sawant, Tulsi Pawar, Ramlal, Dilawar, Iqbal, Trambak, Leela Jaywant, Daksha, Jinnatkumari and Baby Saroj.

== Production ==
The film was directed and scripted by Chaturbhuj Doshi. It was based on Gujarati writer Jhaverchand Meghani's popular social novel Vevishal. It was produced by P. B. Zaveri under the banner of Kirti Pictures.

== Soundtrack ==
The lyrics were written by Prafull Desai, a Gujarati theater lyricist, and composed by Mohan Junior and Ramesh Desai.

Vevishal

Soundtrack album by Mohan Junior, Ramesh Desai
- Released: 1949
- Genre: Feature film soundtrack
- Language: Gujarati

All lyrics are written by Prafull Desai; all music is composed by Mohan Junior, Ramesh Desai

Track listing
No.	Title	Singer(s)	Length
1.	"Halya Alya Kaliya, Halya Alya Dholiya"
2.	"Mann ni Mena Mithu Boli, Bethi Asha Dal Re"
3.	"Zoomkho Khowayo"	Rampyari, Indukumari	3:18
4.	"Mara Sapanane Pankho Aavi"	Rajkumari	3:08
5.	"Dile Dhadkan Mithi Mithi, Nayanma Kai Khumari Chhe"
6.	"Mare Banavu Nanadi Nani"	Baby Saroj	3:24
7.	"Kahone Mara Raja"	Rampyari	3:19
