= Musafir (1940 film) =

- Directed by: Chaturbhuj Doshi
- Produced by: Chandulal Shah
- Starring: Khursheed; Noor Mohammed Charlie; Ishwarlal
- Production company: Ranjit Studios
- Release date: 1940
- Country: India
- Language: Hindi

Musafir is a 1940 social Hindi language film directed by Chaturbhuj Doshi. Produced by Ranjit Studios, the music was by Gyan Dutt and it starred Noor Mohammed Charlie, Khursheed, Ishwarlal and Yakub.

The story was about a prince (Charlie) who returns to his kingdom and finds it in a mess due to the evil-doers' conspiracies to take over. The film was given a good review by the editor of Filmindia, Baburao Patel, adding, "For sheer entertainment Musafir is hard to beat".

== Cast ==
- Noor Mohammed Charlie
- Khursheed
- Ishwarlal
- Yakub
- Vasanti
- Bhupatrai
- Kesari
- Mirza Mushraff
- Bhagwandas

== Music ==
The music direction was by Gyan Dutt with lyrics written by D. N. Madhok. The singers were Brijmala, Khursheed, Charlie, Vasanti and Kantilal.

=== Song list ===
| # | Title | Singer |
|---|---|---|
| 1 | "Apni Shaam Bhai Aur Jagwaalon Ka Hua Savera" | Kantilal |
| 2 | "Aankh Kahe Main Teer Chalaun" | Brijmala |
| 3 | "Akeli Na Jaiyo Radhe Shri Jamuna Ke Teer" | Vasanti |
| 4 | "Gaoongi Main Toh Girwar Ke Gun Gaoongi" | Gulab, Vasanti |
| 5 | "Khatmal KI Hai Basti" | Charlie |
| 6 | "Gori Tera Nirmal Joban Yun Ganga Ka Paani" | Vasanti |
| 7 | "Kisne Haara Hai Mora Bhola Mann" | Khursheed, Vasanti |
| 8 | "Piya Nahin Laage Jiya" | Khursheed, Vasanti |
| 9 | "Topiwale Babuji" | Brijmala |
| 10 | "Woh Bisari Kahani Sun" | Vasanti |
