= Veer Hamirji – Somnath ni Sakhate =

Veer Hamirji — Somnath ni Sakhate
- Directed by: Nilesh Indu Maruti Mohite
- Written by: Devn Shah
- Screenplay by: Maulik Pathak and Nilesh Mohite
- Produced by: Bhagirath Joshi, Chintan, Maulik
- Starring: Maulik Pathak
- Edited by: Maulik Pathak
- Music by: Samir Raval
- Production company: Mahee Studio
- Distributed by: Mahee Productions
- Release date: 25 May 2012
- Running time: 150 minutes
- Country: India
- Language: Gujarati

Veer Hamirji - Somnath ni Sakhate is a Gujarati film released on 25 May 2012. The film did not perform well at the Gujarati box office as it stayed in the cinema for just one week. However, it was shortlisted for Indian submissions for the Academy Award for Best International Feature Film(but lost to Barfi!), making it the first ever Gujarati film to do so. Following the shortlisting, the movie was rescheduled for a release in India, as well as in the United States in December 2012.

== Plot ==
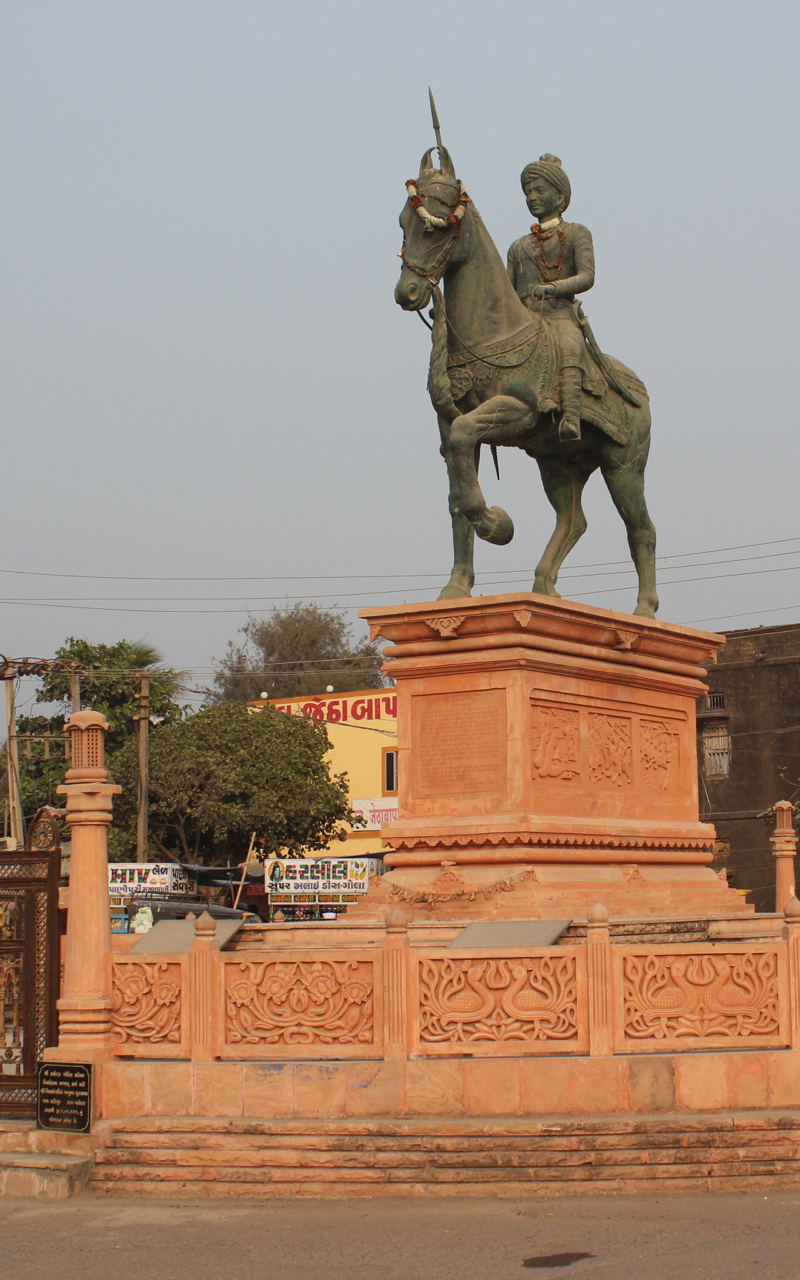
Monument of Hamirji in front of Somnath temple

The story revolves around compositions of the poets Zaverchand Meghani, Kalapi, Jaymal Parmar and Dipakkumar Vyas. The movie is based on the historical story of the warrior Hammir Ji Gohil. The movie shows the life of Gohil: fights, personal life, love and death. The movie centres on Rajput warrior Gohil, who fought and sacrificed his life to save the Somnath Temple. There is a monument to his memory in front of the temple of Somanath in Veraval, Gujarat, which is shown at the end of the movie.

== Voice cast ==
Most of the cast are alumni of M.S. University, Vadodra. The cast includes: Maulik Pathak (lead actor), Shivalika Kataria, Pramthes Mehta, Linesh Phanse, Sonya Shah and Chetan Doshi, Darshan Purohit & Dipakkumar Vyas.

== Production and release ==
The film was a maiden production by Vadodara-based Mahee Productions. It was produced by Bhagirath Joshi and the lead actor, Maulik Pathak. The film was released on 25 May 2012 in Gujarati cinemas. The movie ran for one week and was pulled off. However, it will be released again in December 2012 in the United States and India.

== Recognition ==
The movie became the first ever Gujarati film to have been shortlisted for the official Indian submissions for the Academy Award for Best International Feature Film. Along with the movie, there are also 17 other nominations from India, of which 11 are Hindi films. The nominations for the category along with the movie, include Paan Singh Tomar, Barfi!, Kahaani, The Dirty Picture, Heroine, Gangs of Wasseypur - Part 1, Gangs of Wasseypur - Part 2, etc. Maulik Pathak, talking about the nomination said that, "[T]his is a historical event for Gujarati cinema and a matter of great pride. This is the first time that a Gujarati film has been shortlisted for Oscar nomination. It's a proud moment for the industry. We hope that the film gets nominated and gives a new beginning to the Gujarati film industry. Till now, people thought it was just another historical film but the shortlisting has generated the perception. The impression that every Gujarati film is just another movie disturbed us. But the Oscar shortlisting will give a boost to the film. We also have a dubbed version of the film ready in Hindi for the national audience".

== Box office ==
Upon its release on 25 May in Gujarati cinemas, the movie did not do well at the box office in another part of Gujarat, but it completed 100 days in Bhavnagar and other regions of Saurashtra. Because of its historical values, The education minister of Gujarat signed a letter for showing the movie to children of Gujarat.
