= The Secretary (1938 film) =

1938 Hindi-language Indian comedy film by Chaturbhuj Doshi

The Secretary सचिव
- Directed by: Chaturbhuj Doshi
- Produced by: Chandulal Shah
- Starring: Noor Mohammed Charlie; Madhuri; Trilok Kapoor; Wahidan Bai
- Music by: Gyan Dutt
- Production company: Ranjit Studios
- Release date: 1938
- Country: India
- Language: Hindi

The Secretary is a 1938 Hindi-language Indian comedy film directed by Chaturbhuj Doshi. The film was produced by Chandulal Shah under the Ranjit Pictures banner. The music was provided by Gyan Dutt with lyrics by Pyare Lal Santoshi. The main cast was Noor Mohammed Charlie, Trilok Kapoor, Madhuri, Kalyani Das, Waheedan Bai and Rajkumari.

The film is about an heiress, played by Madhuri, who falls in love with her father's secretary played by Trilok Kapoor.

== Cast ==
- Madhuri
- Trilok Kapoor
- Charlie
- Kalyani
- Wahidan Bai
- Rajkumari

== Debut direction ==
According to Narwekar, Secretary was the first film Doshi directed after having worked for Ranjit Studios as a scriptwriter since 1929. However, as cited by Filmindia and Rajadhyaksha and Willemen, this was reportedly his second film, with Gorakh Aaya which was also made the same year, being his first. The film was a bilingual being made in Hindi and Gujarati. Doshi, thus laid the groundwork for Gujarati film production along with his other films like Gunsundari (1948).

== Soundtrack ==
#	Title	Singer(s)
1	"Kyun Tune Ki Nadani"	Wahidan Bai
2	"Nahin Nahin Kholoon Ghunghat Pat Saiyan"	Wahidan Bai
3	"Kahan Chhupa Hai Chitchor"	Kalyani Das
4	"Karoongi Aaj Piya Sang"	Rajkumari
5	"Kaun Raahe Tu Jaaye Musafir"	Kalyani Das
6	"Chalte Jaana, Chalte Jaana"	
7	"Jodi Bani Nirali Babu"	
8	"Saj Lun Baanke Gahnwa"	
9	"Bhaiya Kisan Jab Aave"	
10	"Hai Teer Ya Nashtar"	
