= Maheman =

- Directed by: Chaturbhuj Doshi
- Starring: Madhuri; Ishwarlal; Mubarak; Shamim Bano
- Music by: Khemchand Prakash; D. N. Madhok (lyrics)
- Production company: Ranjit Studios
- Release date: 1942
- Country: India
- Language: Hindi

Maheman (The Guest) is a Bollywood film. It was released in 1942. The film was produced by Ranjit Studios and directed by Chaturbhuj Doshi. The film starred Madhuri, Ishwarlal, Mubarak, Bhagwandas and Shamim Bano. The music was directed by Khemchand Prakash, with lyrics by D. N. Madhok.

== Cast ==
- Madhuri
- Ishwarlal
- Shamim Bano
- Rama Shukal
- Mubarak
- Kesari
- Gharpure
- Bhagwandas
- Indira

== Soundtrack ==
The film's music was composed by Khemchand Prakash with lyrics written by D. N. Madhok. The singers were Rajkumari, Shamim Akhtar, Kesari, Sunila Das Gupta and Bulo C. Rani.

=== Song list ===
#	Title	Singer
1	"Aayi Atariya Pe Sone Na Sone Diya"	Shamim Akhtar
2	"Kya Chain Se Baithe Hain Baichain Mujhe Kar Ke"	Rajkumari
3	"Meri Jholi Mein Hain Mere Chor"	Rajkumari, Kesari
4	"Daga Deke Chale Nahin Jana"	Sunila Das Gupta
5	"Bana Na Taan Gori"	Rajkumari
6	"Akele Honge Ri Chal Jamna Ke"	Rajkumari, Kesari
7	"Is Ghoomti Duniya Mein Hai Kiska Thikana"	Shamim
8	"Roothna Pyar Mein Hai Karwat Ka Badal Jana"	Bulo C. Rani
9	"Yeh Mere Bhaiya Yeh Unka Dil Hai"	Shamim
10	"Zara Dheere Ho Dheere Sajanwa"	Shamim, Rama Shukul
11	"Teer Unke Kaleje Ka Us Paar Nahin Hota"	Shamim Akhtar
12	"Saiyan Gaye Pardes Main Soye Rahi"	Sunila Das Gupta
