= Chandrakant Sangani =

Chandrakant Sangani (c. 1929 – 28 July 1997) was an Indian Gujarati language director, writer and actor from Gujarat, who worked predominantly in Gujarati cinema.

== Biography ==
Sangani was born in Saurashtra region of Gujarat, India. Sangani started his career as a radio performer, and wrote novels. He served as a journalist for the Gujarati magazine Prajatantra from 1957 to 1963. In 1968, he debuted in Gujarati cinema with his film Mare Javun Pele Paar.

In 1970, he adapted Chunilal Shah's novel Jigar Ane Ami into film by the same title. His musical drama Tanariri, based on the story of Tana and Riri, (1975) is considered to be a significant film in Gujarati cinema. In 1977, he adapted Shayda's story Vanzari Vaav into film Kariyavar.

Sangani died from heart failure in Bombay, on 28 July 1997, at the age of 68.

== Filmography ==
- Mare Javun Pele Paar (1968)
- Jigar Ane Ami (1970)
- Tanariri (1975)
- Sati Jasma Odan (1976)
- Vanjari Vav (1977)
- Saubhagya Sindoor (1977)
- Tame Re Champo Ne Ame Kel (1978)
- Garvo Garasiyo (1980)
- Parayana To Pyara Ladi (1980)
- Vansli Vagi Valamni (1981)
- Prem Diwani (1982)
- Raakhna Ramakada (1983)
- Sorathno Savaj (1985)
- Gunahon Ke Shatranj (1988)
- Ghar Ek Mandir (1988), TV series
- Mayavi Jaal (1992), TV series
- Geetanjali (1993)
