= Gujarati cinema =

Segment of Indian cinema

- No. of screens: 731 (2022)
- Main distributors: CineMan Productions; Coconut Motion Pictures; Rupam Entertainment

Produced feature films (2019)
- Total: 80

Narsinh Mehta (1932) was the first full-length Gujarati talkie.

Gujarati cinema, also known as Dhollywood, is the segment of Indian cinema, dedicated to the production of motion pictures in the Gujarati language widely spoken in the state of Gujarat. It is based in Ahmedabad. It is one of the major regional and vernacular film industries of the cinema of India, having produced more than one thousand films since its inception.

During the silent film era, many individuals in the industry were Gujaratis. The language-associated industry dates back to 1932, when the first Gujarati talkie, Narsinh Mehta, was released. Until the independence of India in 1947, only twelve Gujarati films were produced. There was a spurt in film production in the 1940s focused on saint, sati (Note: The word "Sati" has a wide range of meanings. Here "Sati" is used for "a good woman, devoted to her husband" or "a woman who confines her all thoughts about men to her husband." (Hindi sabdasagara dictionary) The English dictionaries define it as the act of a woman who immolates herself on the funeral pyre of her husband. See Sati. This practise is now obsolete. Here it is used for a person, not for the practise.) or dacoit stories as well as mythology and folktales. In the 1950s–1960s, the trend continued with the addition of films on literary works. In the 1970s, the Government of Gujarat announced a tax exemption and subsidies which resulted in an increase in the number of films, but the quality declined.

After flourishing through the 1960s–1980s, the industry saw a decline through 2000 when the number of new films dropped below twenty. The Gujarat state government announced a tax exemption again in 2005 which lasted until 2017. The industry has been partially revived in the 2010s due first to rural demand, and later to an influx of new technology and urban subjects in films. The state government announced a policy of incentives in 2016.

== Etymology ==
Bollywood, the sobriquet for the Hindi language film industry based in Mumbai (then called Bombay), inspired the nickname Dhollywood for the Gujarati film industry due to its profuse use of the dhol, a double-headed drum. It is also referred to as Gollywood, a portmanteau derived from Gujarat and Bollywood.

== History ==
=== Silent film era (1913–1931) ===
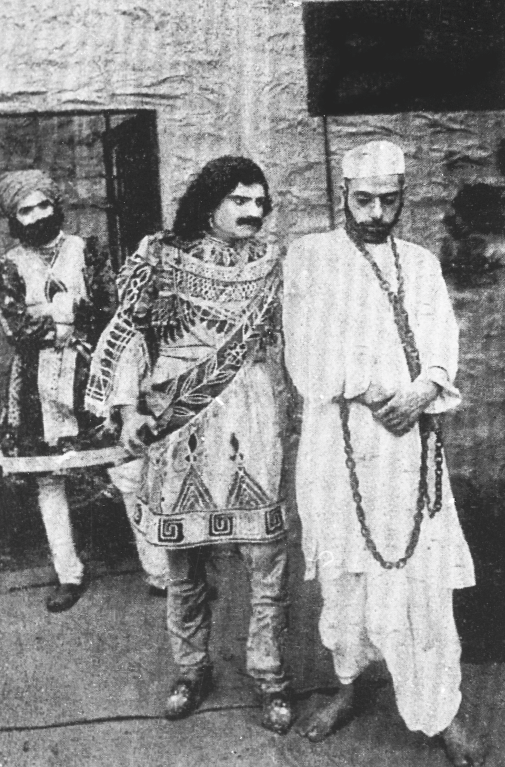
Still from Bhakta Vidur (1921), the first film banned by British colonial authorities

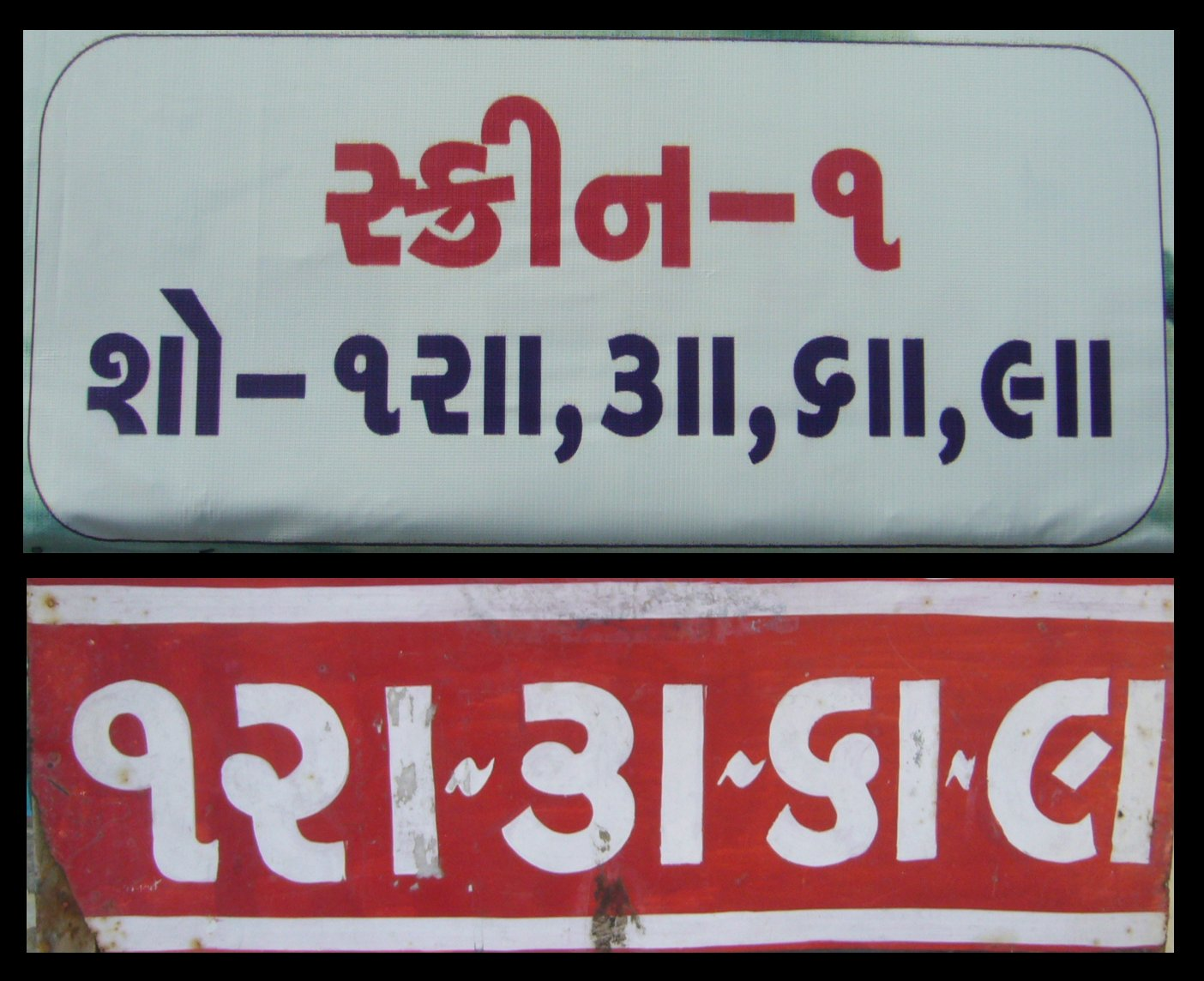
Cinema show times written in typical Gujarati style; (above) Screen-1 Show – 12 1/2, 3 1/2, 6 1/2, 9 1/2 (below) 12 1/4, 3 1/4, 6 1/4, 9 1/4

Even before the advent of talkies there were several silent films closely related to the Gujarati people and their culture, and many directors, producers and actors who were Gujarati and Parsi. Between 1913 and 1931 there were twenty leading film company and studios owned by Gujaratis—mostly in Bombay (now Mumbai)—and at least forty-four leading Gujarati directors.

The silent film Bilwamangal (also called Bhagat Soordas, 1919) was directed by Rustomji Dhotiwala, a Parsi Gujarati, based on a story by Gujarati writer Champshi Udeshi. This full-length (132 minutes, 12,000 feet (3,700 m)) film was produced by Elphinstone Bioscope Company of Calcutta (now Kolkata in West Bengal), and is considered Bengali. Suchet Singh established the Oriental Film Manufacturing Company of Bombay with the help of Hajimahamad Allarakha, an editor of the popular Gujarati magazine Visami Sadi, in 1919. The silent film Narsinh Mehta (1920), produced by Oriental, featured the Gujarati song "Vaishnav Jan To", which was sung by the audience and musicians in cinema halls with relevant scenes on screen.

Dwarkadas Sampat, an early Gujarati film producer, began his involvement with the film industry in Rajkot. He bought a projector and held film shows. He later established Patankar Friends & Company with S. N. Patankar for film productions. Raja Sriyal was the company's first film, but it was not released due to a defective print. Kach-Devyani (1920), directed by Patankar, featured garba dancing, marking the first appearance of Gujarati culture in films. Sampat later founded the Kohinoor Film Company. Kohinoor's first film, Sati Parvati (1920), which also depicted Gujarati culture, was directed by Vishnupant Divekar and featured Prabha, an actress from Rajkot, in the lead role of Parvati. Bhakta Vidur (1921), directed by Kanjibhai Rathod, was implicitly political: The film featured Sampat in the lead role of Vidur, who donned a Gandhi cap, an allusion to the Indian independence movement led by Mahatma Gandhi. The film had a Gujarati song sung by Vidur's wife, "Rudo Maro Rentiyo, Rentiyama Nikle Taar, Taare Taare Thay Bharatno Uddhar", (Note: Gujarati: રૂડો મારો રેંટિયો, રેંટિયામાં નીકળે તાર, તારે તારે થાય ભારતનો ઉદ્ધાર. (lit. 'So beautiful is my spinning wheel that spins fine threads, each of which will save India.')) referred to the spinning wheel (rentio) on the flag of the Indian National Congress at that time. It was the first film banned in India by British authorities. It was re-released in 1922 under the title Dharm Vijay. Pavagadhnu Patan (The Fall of Pavagadh, 1928) was directed by Nagendra Majumdar and produced by Indulal Yagnik. Yagnik was an independence activist who later headed the Mahagujarat movement demanding a separate Gujarat state. Yagnik produced ten films under various banners.

Kohinoor produced many films in the silent film era, including social problem films in a period dominated by mythological films. Katorabhar Khoon (1920) was its first social film. Manorama (1924) was directed by Homi Master and was based on Hridaya Triputi, an autobiographical poem by the Gujarati poet Kalapi. Gul-E-Bakavali (1924), written by Mohanlal G. Dave and directed by Rathod, ran successfully for fourteen weeks. Manilal Joshi, an experimental Gujarati director, directed Veer Abhimanyu (1922), which was produced by the Star Film Company, and later Prithvi Vallabh (1924) based on the novel by Gujarati author K. M. Munshi.

The Krishna Film Company, established in 1924 and owned by Maneklal Patel, produced forty-four films between 1925 and 1931. The Sharda Film Company was established in 1925, financed by Mayashankar Bhatt and run by Bhogilal Dave and Nanubhai Desai. Bhatt also financed Dadasaheb Phalke's Hindustan Cinema Film Company.

=== Early talkies (1932–1947) ===
Before the 1931 release of the first full-length Indian sound film, Alam Ara, a short Gujarati sound film, Chav Chavno Murabbo, was released on 4 February 1931 in Bombay. It included the song Mane Mankad Karde ("A Bug Bites Me"), the first sound in any Indian film. The film was produced by Maneklal Patel, with lyrics and dialogue by Natwar Shyam. The title, literally "Chew Chew's Marmalade", refers to having to chew marmalade to swallow it and probably has no specific connection to the plot.

Before the first full-length Gujarati sound film, Narsinh Mehta (1932), two short Gujarati sound films were released with Hindi talkies. The two-reel short Krishna–Sudama, produced by the Imperial Film Company, was released with Hindi talkie Nek Abala. Another two-reel short, Mumbai ni Shethani was premiered along with Madan's Shirin Farhad on 9 January 1932 at Wellington Cinema, Bombay. It was produced by Theatres of Calcutta and was based on the story written by Champshi Udeshi. The film starred Mohan, Miss Sharifa and Surajram and included the Gujarati song Fashion ni Fishiari, Juo, Mumbai ni Shethani.

The release of the first full-length Gujarati talkie, Narsinh Mehta on 9 April 1932 marks the true beginning of Gujarati cinema. It was directed by Nanubhai Vakil, produced by Sagar Movietone, and starred Mohanlala, Marutirao, Master Manhar, and Miss Mehtab. It was of the 'saint' genre and was on the life of the saint Narsinh Mehta.

It was followed in 1932 by Sati Savitri, based on the epic story of Savitri and Satyavan, and in 1935 by the comedy Ghar Jamai, directed by Homi Master. Ghar Jamai starred: Heera, Jamna, Baby Nurjehan, Amoo, Alimiya, Jamshedji, and Gulam Rasool. It featured a 'resident son-in-law' and his escapades as well as his problematic attitude towards the freedom of women.

Gunsundari was made three times from 1927 to 1948. The film was such a success in its first appearance in 1927, that director Chandulal Shah remade it in Hindi in 1934. It was remade again in Gujarati and Hindi in 1948 by Ratibhai Punatar. Gunsundari is the story of a poor Indian woman who is disliked by her husband for her moral stand. The woman finally lands on the street where she meets a person who is just like her—a social outcast. The story ends there. However, the three versions include some changes to reflect their times.

There were twelve films released between 1932 and 1940. No Gujarati films were produced in 1933, 1937 or 1938. From 1941 to 1946 there was no production, due to the rationing of raw materials during World War II.

=== Post-independence (1946–1970) ===
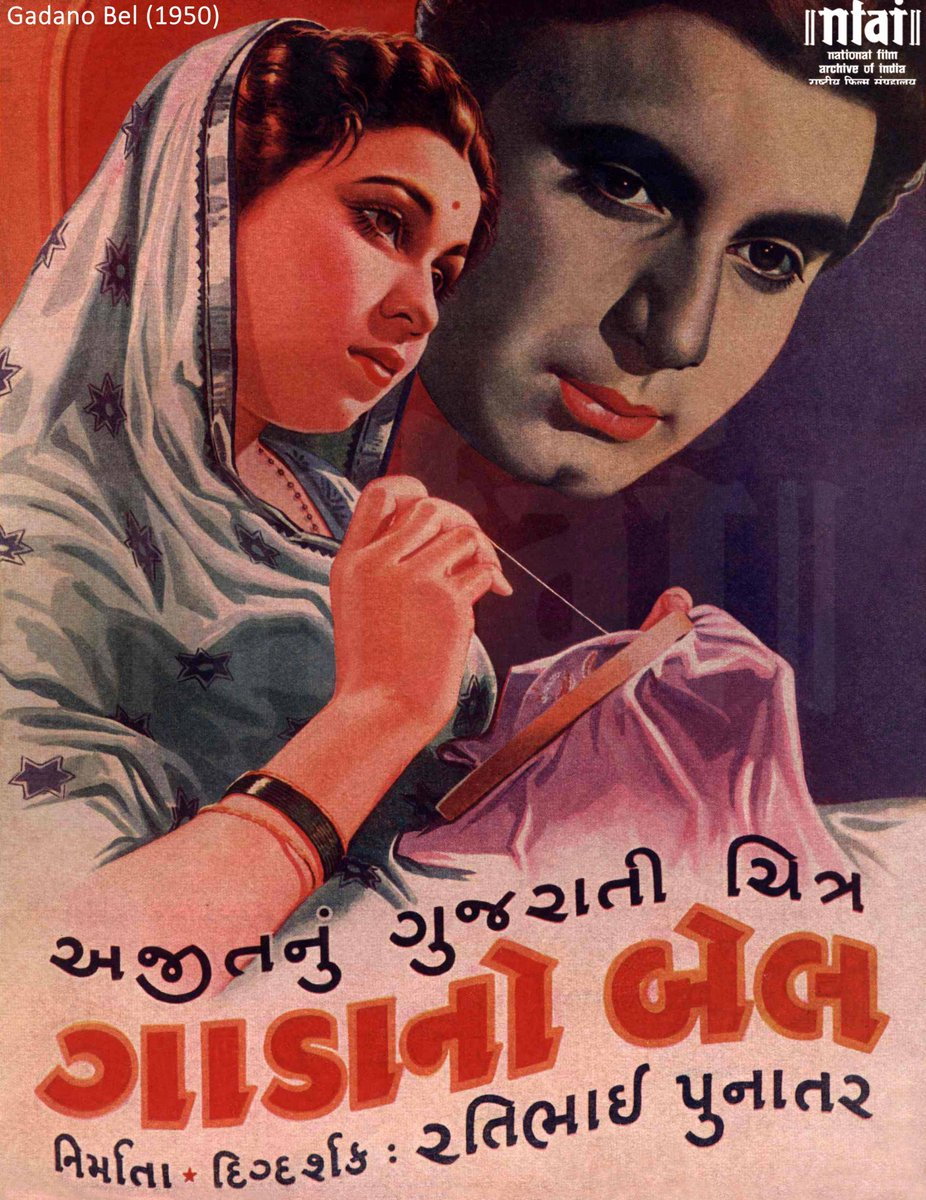
Poster of Gadano Bel (1950), directed by Ratibhai Punatar, was based on the play by Prabhulal Dwivedi.

After the independence of India in 1947, there was a surge in the production of Gujarati films. Twenty-six films were produced in 1948 alone. Between 1946 and 1952, seventy-four films were produced including twenty-seven films related to saint, sati or dacoit stories. These stories were designed to appeal to rural audiences familiar with such subjects. Several films produced during this period were associated with myths or folktales people were familiar with.

Vishnukumar M. Vyas directed Ranakdevi (1946) based on the legend of Ranakdevi. Nirupa Roy made her debut as an actress in the film and later succeeded in the Hindi film industry playing the role of a mother in various films. Meerabai (1946) was a remake of the Hindi film directed by Nanubhai Bhatt starring Nirupa Roy. Punatar directed Gunsundari (1948) also starring Nirupa Roy. Kariyavar (1948), directed by Chaturbhuj Doshi, introduced Dina Pathak to the film audience. Doshi also directed Vevishal (1949), an adaptation of the novel of the same name by Jhaverchand Meghani. Punatar's Mangalfera (1949) was a remake of the Hindi film Shaadi (1941) produced by Ranjit Movietone. Other popular Gujarati films were Vadilona Vanke (1948) directed by Ramchandra Thakur; Gadano Bel (1950) directed by Ratibhai Punatar based on the play by Prabhulal Dwivedi; and Liludi Dharati (1968) directed by Vallabh Choksi based on the novel of the same name by Chunilal Madia. Liludi Dharati was the Gujarati cinema's first colour film.

Between 1951 and 1970, there was a decline in film production with only fifty-five films produced during this period. Malela Jeev (1956) was directed by Manhar Raskapur based on the novel of same name by Pannalal Patel which was scripted by the novelist himself. Raskapur and producer-actor Champshibhai Nagda produced several films including: Jogidas Khuman (1948), Kahyagaro Kanth (1950), Kanyadan (1951), Mulu Manek (1955), Malela Jeev (1956), Kadu Makrani (1960), Mendi Rang Lagyo (1960), Jogidas Kuman (1962), Akhand Saubhagyavati (1963) and Kalapi (1966). Akhand Saubhagyavati was the first Gujarati film financed by the Film Finance Corporation (now the National Film Development Corporation) and starred Asha Parekh in the lead role. Kanku (1969), directed by Kantilal Rathod, was based on the short story by Pannalal Patel originally written in 1936 and later expanded into a novel in 1970. Kanku won the National Film Award for Best Feature Film in Gujarati at the 17th National Film Awards, and its actress Pallavi Mehta won an award at the Chicago International Film Festival.

Sanjeev Kumar, a popular Hindi film actor, acted in: Ramat Ramade Ram (1964), Kalapi (1966) and Jigar ane Ami (1970). Jigar ane Ami was adapted from the novel of same name by Chunilal Vardhman Shah. Vidhata (1956), Chundadi Chokha (1961), Ghar Deevdi (1961), Nandanvan (1961), Gharni Shobha (1963), Panetar (1965), Mare Jaavu Pele Paar (1968), Bahuroopi (1969) and Sansarleela (1969) were adapted from Gujarati literary works.

=== Rise and decline (1970–2000) ===
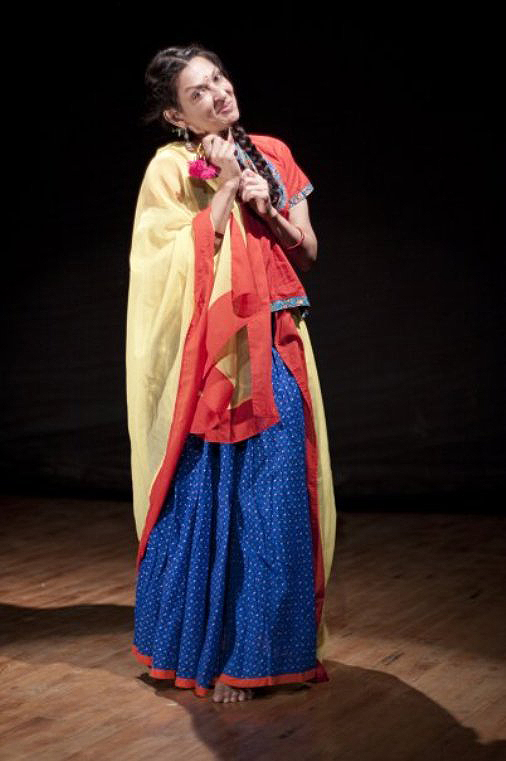
Mallika Sarabhai, Gujarati actress

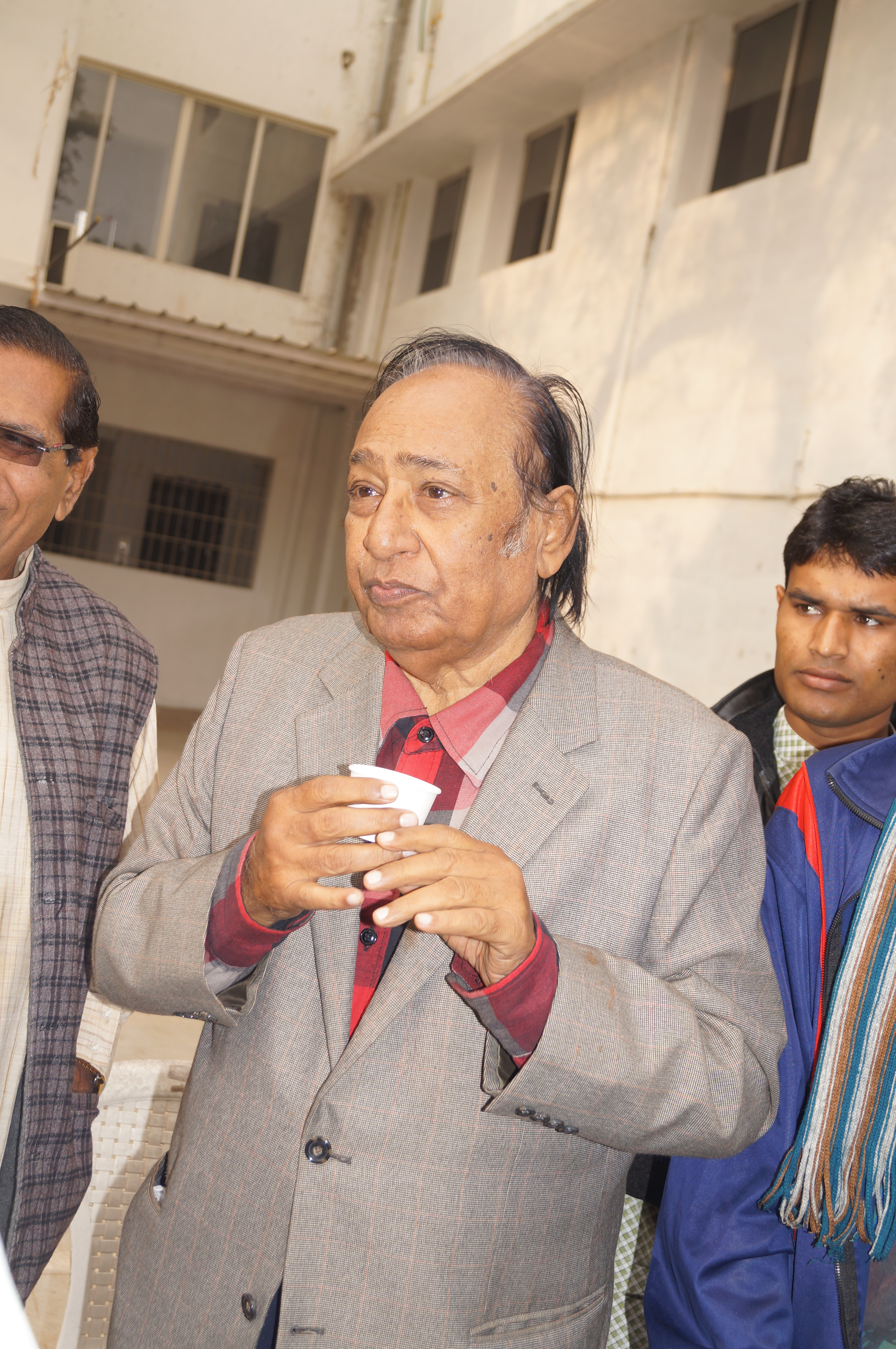
Upendra Trivedi, one of the most successful Gujarati actors and producers

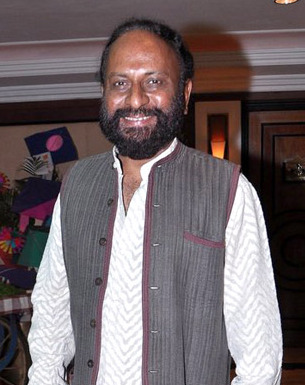
Ketan Mehta, who directed Bhavni Bhavai which won two National Awards

Following the Mahagujarat movement, the separate linguistic states of Gujarat and Maharashtra were formed from the Bombay State on 1 May 1960. This had a great impact on the Gujarati film industry as Bombay, the centre of film production, fell in Maharashtra. There was a lack of major film production houses and studios in Gujarat resulting in a decline in the quality and number of films.

In the 1970s, the Government of Gujarat announced subsidies and tax exemptions for Gujarati films resulting in a spurt in film production. A studio was established in Vadodara in 1972. The state policy which benefited producers cost the state ₹8 crore (equivalent to ₹179 crore or US$19 million in 2026) in 1981–1982 for the thirty-nine films produced during that period. An entertainment tax exemption of ₹3 lakh (equivalent to ₹67 lakh or US$70,000 in 2026) was announced for producers who completed films. This policy resulted in an influx of people interested in monetary benefits who did not have any technical or artistic knowledge, thus the quality of films declined substantially. After 1973 a large number of films were produced focused on deities and dacoits. In 1980, the tax exemption was reduced to 70% but the remaining 30% was given to producers for assistance in other ways.

Gunsundarino Gharsansar (1972), directed by Govind Saraiya, won the National Film Award for Best Feature Film in Gujarati at the 20th National Film Awards. The film was based on the novel Saraswatichandra and was considered important for its artistry and aesthetic. Feroze A. Sarkar directed Janamteep (1973) adapted from the novel of same name by Ishwar Petlikar. Kanti Madia adapted Vinodini Nilkanth's short story Dariyav Dil for the film Kashino Dikro (1979). Babubhai Mistry directed a dozen films between 1969 and 1984. Dinesh Raval directed twenty six hit films including: Mena Gurjari (1975), Amar Devidas (1981) and Sant Rohidas (1982). Actor-director Krishnakant, popularly known as KK, directed about a dozen Gujarati films including Kulvadhu (1977), Gharsansar (1978), Visamo (1978) and Jog Sanjog (1980). These films were critically as well as popularly well received. KK had long and successful acting career in Hindi and Bengali cinema too. Mehul Kumar directed several hits including: Janam Janam na Sathi (1977), Ma Vina Suno Sansar (1982), Dholamaru (1983) and Meru Malan (1985). Jesal Toral (1971) directed by Ravindra Dave was one of the biggest hits of Gujarati cinema. He also directed over twenty-five films popular with audiences. Chandrakant Sangani directed the musical film Tanariri (1975), based on the Gujarati folk-lore of Tana and Riri, which highlighted a little-known side of Akbar who is usually presented as a consistently benign ruler. He also directed Kariyavar (1977) based on the novel Vanzari Vaav by Shayda. Sonbai ni Chundadi (1976), directed by Girish Manukant, was the first Gujarati cinemascope film. Mansai na Deeva (1984), directed by Govind Saraiya, was based on the novel of the same name by Jhaverchand Meghani. Subhash J. Shah directed several popular films: Lohi Bhini Chundadi (1986), Prem Bandhan (1991), Oonchi Medina Ooncha Mol (1996), Parbhavni Preet (1997), and Mahisagarna Moti (1998).

From 1973 to 1987, Arun Bhatt produced several films matching the production values of Hindi films. He made several films with urban backgrounds such as Mota Gharni Vahu, Lohini Sagaai (1980) based on the novel by Ishwar Petlikar, Paarki Thaapan, Shetal Tara Oonda Paani (1986) which were commercially as well as critically successful. His movie Pooja na Phool, made in the early 1980s, won him an award for the Best Film from the Government of Gujarat and was also telecast on Doordarshan in the Sunday slot for regional award-winning films.

Bhavni Bhavai (1980), directed by Ketan Mehta, was produced by National Film Development Corporation, the Sanchar Film Cooperative Society, and a district bank in Ahmedabad. Though the film was not a folk theatre form of Bhavai, it incorporated several elements of it. It was praised for performances and camerawork, and won awards such as the National Award for Best Feature Film on National Integration, the National Film Award for Best Art Direction for Meera Lakhia, and another award at the Nantes festival in France. The Parsi Gujarati film Percy (1989) directed by Pervez Merwanji won the National Award for the Best Feature Film in Gujarati at the 37th National Film Awards. Hun Hunshi Hunshilal (1991), directed by Sanjiv Shah, was an allegory film inspired by the political environment of the time and was felt to be post-modern. In 1998, Desh Re Joya Dada Pardesh Joya directed by Govindbhai Patel became very successful and went on to become a super-hit. The film grossed ₹22 crore (US$2.3 million), the highest in the Gujarati cinema at that time, with 1.5 crore (15 million) people watching the film. Vipul Amrutlal Shah produced and directed Dariya Chhoru in 1999 which was well received by the critics but failed commercially. Other hit films of 1990s were Manvini Bhavai (1993), Unchi Medi Na Uncha Mol (1997) and Pandadu Lilu Ne Rang Rato (1999).

Upendra Trivedi was one of the most successful Gujarati actors and producers. He produced Jher To Pidhan Jaani Jaani (1972) based on the epic novel of the same name by Manubhai Pancholi 'Darshak'. He also produced, acted and directed in Manvi ni Bhavai (1993) based on the novel of the same name by Pannalal Patel. The film was widely appreciated and went to win the National Award for the Best Feature Film in Gujarati at the 41st National Film Awards. Arvind Trivedi, Mahesh Kanodia, Naresh Kanodia, Rajendra Kumar, Asrani, Kiran Kumar, Rajiv, Arvind Kirad, Naresh Kanodia, and Hiten Kumar had long and successful careers. Ramesh Mehta and P. Kharsani were popular for their comic roles. Popular Gujarati film actresses included: Mallika Sarabhai, Rita Bhaduri, Aruna Irani, Jayshree T., Bindu, Asha Parekh, and Snehlata.

Avinash Vyas was one of the major composers of the Gujarati cinema who wrote music for 168 Gujarati films and 61 Hindi films. His son Gaurang Vyas was also a composer who wrote the music for Bhavni Bhavai. Mahesh-Naresh composed the music for several Gujarati films including Tanariri. Another notable music composer was Ajit Merchant.

Some 368 Gujarati feature films and 3,562 Gujarati short films were produced by 1981. The Gujarat Film Development Corporation (GFDC) established to promote Gujarati films was closed in 1998.

The quality of the films declined due to the focus on recovering the financial investments and profits as well as not adapting to changing times, technology and demographics. Low budget films with compromised quality targeted rural audiences while urban audiences moved to television and Bollywood films with quality content as they had a fair understanding of the Hindi language.

=== Revival (2000–2025) ===
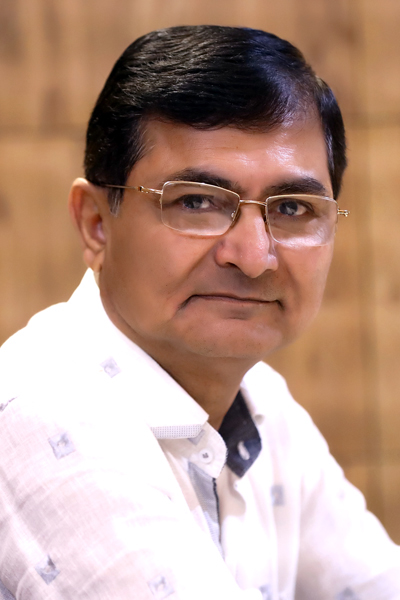
Jashwant Gangani directed Maiyar Ma Mandu Nathi Lagtu, which won 11 of the Gujarat State Film Awards.

Fewer than twenty films a year were produced in the early 2000s. In 2005, the government of Gujarat announced a 100% entertainment tax exemption for U and U/A certified films and 20% tax on A certified films. The government also announced ₹5 lakh (US$5,200) subsidy for Gujarati films. There was an increase in the number of films produced after 2005 due to the tax exemption and the rise in demand for films in rural north Gujarat, especially Banaskantha district. The demand was fueled by the working class population demanding local musical and linguistic styled films which were mostly released in single screen cinemas. The number of films produced per year was over sixty in 2009 and 2010. In 2012, the Gujarati cinema produced a record number of seventy-two films. Maiyar Ma Mandu Nathi Lagtu (2001) directed by Jashwant Gangani, starring Hiten Kumar, was well received. The film's sequel was released in 2008. Gam Ma Piyariyu Ne Gam Ma Sasariyu (2005) and Muthi Uchero Manas (2006) were also well received by audiences. Dholi Taro Dhol Vage (2008) directed by Govindbhai Patel, was produced by Reliance BIG Pictures. Vikram Thakor starred in several films including Ek Var Piyu Ne Malva Aavje (2006). His six films for rural audiences earned ₹3 crore (equivalent to ₹11 crore or US$1.1 million in 2026). He was called the superstar of Gujarati cinema by various media. Hiten Kumar, Chandan Rathod, Hitu Kanodia, Mamta Soni, Roma Manek and Mona Thiba are popular among rural audiences.

Love Is Blind (2005) was the first Gujarati film released in the multiplexes. The Better Half (2008) directed by Ashish Kakkad failed commercially but drew the attention of critics and an urban audience. It was the first Gujarati film on Super 16 mm format. Little Zizou, a 2009 film in Hindi, Gujarati, and English, written and directed by Sooni Taraporevala, won the Silver Lotus Award in the National Film Award for Best Film on Family Welfare category at the 56th National Film Awards. Muratiyo No. 1 (2005) and Vanechandno Varghodo (2007), both starring Devang Patel, were big budget films but had moderate collections. In August 2011, the Gujarati film industry reached a milestone, having produced over a thousand films since the beginning of the talkies. Veer Hamirji (2012) was an historical film which was shortlisted for Indian representation at the Oscars. The Good Road (2013), directed by Gyan Correa, won the Best Feature Film in Gujarati at the 60th National Film Awards and later became the first Gujarati film ever selected to represent India at the Oscars. The film won the Best Feature Film Jury Award at the Indian Film Festival, Houston in October 2013.

Kevi Rite Jaish (2012) and Bey Yaar (2014), both directed by Abhishek Jain; became commercially and critically successful drawing an urban audience. The success of these films drew new actors, directors and producers to the Gujarati film industry which resulted in a spurt in film productions. Gujjubhai the Great and Chhello Divas were declared hit films of 2015. The box office collection of Gujarati films increased from ₹7 crore (US$730,000) in 2014 to ₹55 crore (US$5.7 million) in 2015. Total 65 and 68 films were released in 2014 and 2015 respectively. Total number of screens playing Gujarati films rose from 20 to 25 in 2011 to about 150–160 in 2015.

The ₹5 lakh (US$5,200) subsidy by the Government of Gujarat was discontinued in August 2013. Three years later, in February 2016, a new incentive policy was announced which was focused on the quality of films. Films are graded in four categories, A to D, based on technical aspects, production quality, film components, and box office performance. The producers are provided with assistance of ₹50 lakh (US$52,000) for A grade, ₹25 lakh (US$26,000) for B grade, ₹10 lakh (US$10,000) for C grade and ₹5 lakh (US$5,200) for D grade films or 75% of production costs whichever is lower. A film can also receive additional incentives for its performance at film festivals and awards nominations/wins. The multiplexes are also directed to have at least forty-nine screenings of Gujarati films per year. The entertainment tax exemption for Gujarati films released in Gujarat ended with an introduction of the Goods and Services Tax in July 2017.

The industry continued to grow due to improvement in production quality, increased use of technology, increased film marketing and new subjects targeted at youth. About 50 to 70 films are released each year between 2016 and 2018. The International Gujarati Film Festival made its debut in New Jersey, US, in August 2018. Wrong Side Raju (2016), Dhh (2017), Reva (2018) won the Best Feature Film in Gujarati awards at the 64th, 65th and 66th National Film Awards respectively. Hellaro (2019) became the first Gujarati film to win the National Film Award for Best Feature Film at the 66th National Film Awards. Chaal Jeevi Laiye! (2019) became the highest-grossing film of Gujarati cinema, grossing over est. ₹52.14 crore (US$5.4 million), until it was surpassed in 2025.

Due to COVID-19 pandemic, all cinema halls in Gujarat were ordered to be closed from March to October 2020. They were closed again in March–April 2021 due to resurgence of the pandemic. Chhello Show (2021), directed by Pan Nalin, was selected as the Indian entry for the Best International Feature Film at the 95th Academy Awards. According to film producer Bhavesh Upadhyay and publicist Chetan Chauhan, the annual business of Gujarati cinema had reached about ₹200 crore (US$21 million) by 2022. As of 2022, the average film production cost ranges between ₹2 crore (US$210,000) and ₹2.5 crore (US$260,000) and around 60 Gujarati films were released in each of the recent years. Gandhi & Co. (2022) directed by Manish Saini won the Golden Lotus Awards as the Best Children's Film at 69th National Film Awards. Kutch Express (2023) directed by Viral Shah won three awards at 70th National Film Awards. Gujarati cinema continues to struggle with originality, marketing, and a lack of consistent audience support compared to other Indian regional film industries. According to the Ormax Box Office Report, Gujarati-language films experienced a 66% growth in box office collections in 2024 compared to the previous year, exceeding ₹80 crore and second only to Malayalam cinema. The horror film Vash (2023) by Krishnadev Yagnik won the Best Feature Film in Gujarati awards at the 71st National Film Awards with lead actress Janki Bodiwala winning the Best Actress in a Supporting Role. According to the Ormax Box Office report of 2025, the Gujarati films collectively surpassed ₹100 crore (US$10 million) as well as ₹200 crore (US$21 million) gross box office for the first time. The same year, the devotional drama film Laalo – Krishna Sada Sahaayate was declared the sleeper hit and became the highest-grossing Gujarati film of all-time as well as the first Gujarati film to gross over ₹100 crore (US$10 million) worldwide.

== Subjects ==
The scripts and stories of the Gujarati films include relationship and family oriented subjects, as well as human aspirations and Gujarati family culture. There were a large number of films based on mythological narratives and folklore produced in the early years of Gujarati cinema. The lives of popular saints and satis of Gujarat, like Narsinh Mehta and Gangasati, were made into films. They were targeted at rural audiences familiar with the subjects. The early filmmakers also included subjects dealing with social reforms. There were social films associated with family life and marriage such as Gunsundari and Kariyavar. The historical, social and religious subjects dominated through 1940s and 1950s. Several Gujarati films were adapted from Gujarati novels and stories such as Kashino Dikro. There was a spurt again in the 1970s for saint/sati films. In 1980s and 90s, the films were influenced by the Hindi cinema and several action and romance films were produced. In the early 2000s, films were targeted chiefly at rural audiences demanding local narratives with local linguistic style. Following 2005, the introduction of urban subjects led to a revival of the Gujarati cinema. In 2010s, the films which are more relevant to audiences were produced. Though the comedies continue to succeed at the box office, the films were produced exploring other genres and new themes as well. The films dealing with social issues were also made frequently. The films focused on large Gujarati diaspora are also produced.

== Archives ==
About one thousand and thirty Gujarati films were made between 1932 and 2011 but very few are archived. At the National Film Archive of India (NFAI), only twenty Gujarati films including two Parsi-Gujarati films, Pestoneei (1987) directed by Vijaya Mehta and Percy (1989) directed by Pervez Merwanji, are archived. No silent films or talkies of 1930s and 1940s survived.

== See also ==
- List of Gujarati films
  - 2025
  - 2026
- List of highest-grossing Gujarati films
- National Film Award for Best Gujarati Feature Film
