= Bhakta Surdas =

- Directed by: Chaturbhuj Doshi
- Produced by: Chandulal Shah
- Starring: Khursheed; K. L. Saigal
- Music by: Gyan Dutt; D. N. Madhok (lyrics)
- Production company: Ranjit Studios
- Release date: 1942
- Country: India
- Language: Hindi

Bhakta Surdas is a 1942 Indian Hindi language film devotional film. It was the third highest grossing Indian film of 1942. This was K. L. Saigal's first film after his move to Bombay from Calcutta. The film was directed by Chaturbhuj Doshi for Ranjit Studios. It had music by Gyan Dutt with lyrics by D. N. Madhok. Khursheed, after acting in several less popular films, finally became a big success with this film. The cast included K. L. Saigal, Khursheed, Monica Desai, Nagendra, M. Saigal and N. Desai.

== Cast ==
- K. L. Saigal
- Khursheed
- Monica Desai
- Nagendra
- M. Saigal
- N. Desai
- Gharpure
- Kesarbai
- B. Sharma
- Bashir

== Music ==
Considered as a high point in Saigal's singing career, the film had music by Gyan Dutt with lyrics by D. N. Madhok. His songs "Kadam Chale Aage, Man Pachhe Bhaage" and "Nainheen Ko Raah Dikha Prabhu" were big successes. "Madhukar Shyam Hamare Chor", "Panchhi Baawra, Chand Se Preet Lagaye", "Sar Par Kadam Ki Chhaiyan" (Raag Bhairavi) and "Maiya Mori Main Nahi Maakhan Khayo" are considered as "Immortal bhajans" as are several other "unforgettable songs" from the film.

=== Song list ===
#	Title	Singer
1	"Nainheen Ko Raah Dikha Prabhu"	K. L. Saigal
2	"Nis Din Barsat Nain Hamaare"	K. L. Saigal
2	"Kadam Chale Aage Man Paachhe Bhaage"	K. L. Saigal
3	"Madhukar Shyaam Hamaare Chor"	K. L. Saigal
4	"Maiya Mori Mai Nahi Makhan Khayo"	K. L. Saigal
5	"Din Se Dugunee Ho Jaye Ratiya Hai"	K. L. Saigal
6	"Rain Gayi Ab Hua Savera"	K. L. Saigal
7	"Manwa Krishna Naam Rate Ja"	K. L. Saigal
8	"Madhur Madhur Gaa Re Manawa"	Khursheed
9	"Chandani Rat Aur Tare Khile Ho"	Khursheed, Saigal
10	"Sar Pe Kadamb Ki Chhainya Muraliya Baje Re"	Saigal, Rajkumari
11	"Panchhi Bawara Chand Se Preet Lagaaye"	Khursheed
12	"Naina Re Dekhe Unake Nain"	Khursheed
13	"Jis Jogi Ka Jog Liya"	Khursheed, Saigal
