= Chhoti Maa =

- Directed by: Chaturbhuj Doshi
- Release date: 1943
- Country: India
- Language: Hindi

Chhoti Maa, also called Nurse, is a Bollywood film. It was released in 1943.
