= Gadano Bel =

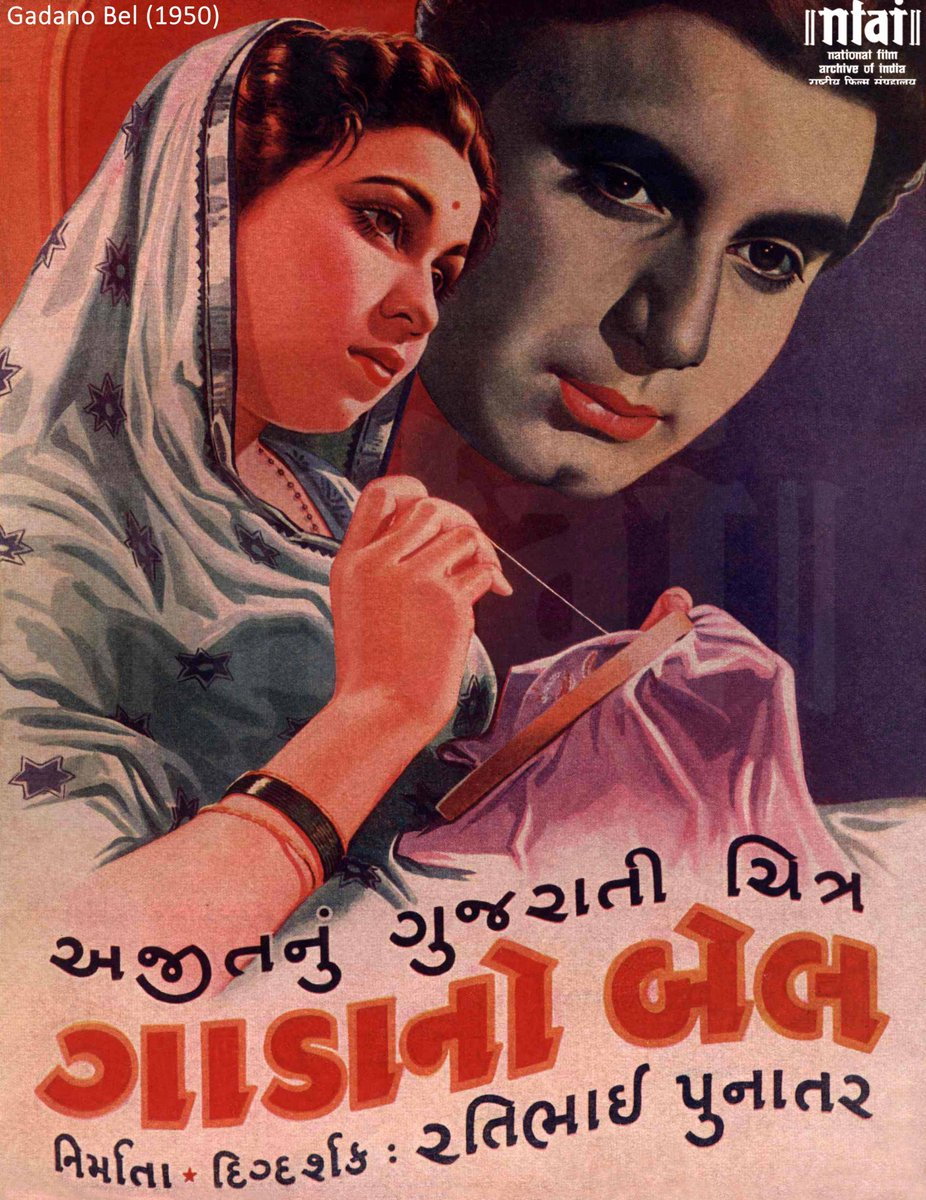
- Poster
- Directed by: Ratibhai Punatar
- Written by: Prabhulal Dwivedi (story), Ramchandra Thakur (screenplay)
- Based on: Play by Deshi Natak Samaj
- Starring: Nirupa Roy; Dulari; Charubala; Lila Kurle; Hirabai; Maya Devi; Manhar Desai; Baburaje; Chhagan Romeo
- Cinematography: M. G. Jadhav
- Music by: Avinash Vyas
- Production company: Ajit Pictures
- Release date: 1950
- Running time: 123 minutes
- Country: India
- Language: Gujarati

Gadano Bel is a 1950 Indian Gujarati-language social drama film directed by Ratibhai Punatar.

== Plot ==
After the death of the family's chief breadwinner, the joint family begins to fall apart. In-laws claim many of the family's possessions, and the house is auctioned. By the ends of the film, only three members of the family remain together.

== Cast ==
The cast is as follows:

- Nirupa Roy
- Dulari
- Charubala
- Lila Kurle
- Hirabai
- Maya Devi
- Manhar Desai
- Baburaje
- Chhagan Romeo
- Ramlal
- Banke Bihari
- Champak Lala
- Bhogilal
- Ramesh
- Girish
- Nityananda Ghosh

== Production ==
The film was based on a popular play by Prabhulal Dwivedi which was first staged by Deshi Natak Samaj, a theatre company.

== Soundtrack ==
Gadano Bel

Soundtrack album by Avinash Vyas
- Released: 1950
- Genre: Feature film soundtrack
- Language: Gujarati
- Label: Saregama

All lyrics are written by Avinash Vyas; all music is composed by Avinash Vyas.

Track listing
No.	Title	Singer(s)	Length
1.	"Ganjeefanu Chhe Ghar"	Geeta Dutt	2:57
2.	"Ene Jeevava Dyo Ne Jari"	Geeta Dutt	3:16
3.	"Naath Tamare Sanj Savare"	Geeta Dutt	3:11
4.	"Hali Jaye Re Vanzar"	A. R. Oza, Asha Bhonsle, Chorus	3:35
5.	"Pataliya Tame Pagal Thaine"	Leela Mehta, Manmohan Sharma, Chorus	5:02
6.	"Raaj Tari Mehlato"	A. R. Oza, Asha Bhonsle, Chorus	2:57
