= Vadilona Vanke =

- Directed by: Ramchandra Thakur
- Written by: Prabhulal Dwivedi
- Based on: Play by Deshi Natak Samaj
- Starring: Motibai; Vasant Nayak; Pratima Devi; Latabai; Ramesh Vyas
- Cinematography: Gordhanbhai Patel
- Music by: Mohan Jr, Prabhulal Dwivedi (lyrics)
- Production company: Saras Pictures
- Release date: 1948
- Running time: 132 minutes
- Country: India
- Language: Gujarati

Vadilona Vanke (lit. 'For Forefather's Fault') is 1948 Indian Gujarati social drama film directed by Ramchandra Thakur.

== Plot ==
The story revolves around conflict of rights and ambitions in a joint family. Snehgopal, a retired dewan has two daughters: elder Samata who is married to imprisoned political activist Pushkar, and younger Shobhna is married to modernised and aimless Kirtikumar. Pushkar's window mother Bhagirathi and younger brother Surendra are also involved. Other members of the family, employees of Pushakar and Snehgopal as well as a criminal also plays part in the drama. When Pushkar dies in the end, the hostilities in the family ends.

== Cast ==
The cast is as follows:

- Motibai
- Vasant Nayak
- Pratima Devi
- Latabai
- Ramesh Vyas
- Anant Vin
- Amrit
- Anjana
- Neelam
- Chunilal Nayak
- Master Pransukh
- Baby Saroj
- Vijaya
- Keshav Purohit
- Jayshankar
- Chhagan Romeo

== Production ==
The melodramatic film depicted social impact of "modernisation" of Indian society. It is based on a popular 1938 play written by Prabhulal Dwivedi and produced by the Deshi Natak Samaj, a theatre company. The stage play featured a song "Dil Hoy Amiri Biradar To".

The film song "Mitha Lagya Te Mane Aajna Ujagara'' sung by Motibai became popular.

== See also ==
- List of Gujarati films
