= Dhiraj =

- Song synopsis booklet cover
- Directed by: Chaturbhuj Doshi
- Produced by: Chandulal Shah
- Starring: Sitara Devi; Ishwarlal; Nur Jehan; Rajkumari Shukla
- Music by: Gyan Dutt
- Release date: 1942
- Country: India
- Language: Hindi

Dhiraj (Patience) is a Bollywood social film. It was released in 1942. The film was directed by Chaturbhuj Doshi for Ranjit Movietone. Gyan Dutt was the music director, with lyrics by Pandit Indra. The cast included Sitara Devi, Ishwarlal, Kesari, Nurjehan.

Dhiraj was doing successful business at the box-office when it was banned by the British government on the request of the Advisors to the governors. "They had grown intolerant of introduction of symbols like pictures of national leaders in films".

== Cast ==
- Sitara Devi
- Ishwarlal
- Kesari
- Nurjehan
- Khatoon
- Dhiraj
- Rajkumari

== Soundtrack ==
The music was composed by Gyan Dutt and the lyricist was Pandit Indra. The singers were Ishwar Lal, Gyan Dutt, Nur Jehan, Kesari.

=== Songlist ===
#	Title	Singer
1	"Manua Mann Me Dhiraj Dhar"	Ishwarlal
2	"O Sahiba Jaiyyo Na Des Bangal"	Nur Jehan, Kesari
3	"Tu Kaisa Hai Bhagwan"	Gyan Dutt
4	"Aaj Aaye Ghanshyam Re"	
5	"Aaj Angna Me Salone Shyam Aaye"	
6	"Aaj Ham Bhi Bade Ghar Ke Mehman Bane"	
7	"Dham Dham Dham Veer Chale"	
8	"Jalebi Khaungi"	
9	"Main To Bik Gayi Shyam Ke Naam"	
10	"Milna Hai To Yun Milo"	
11	"So Ja Lalna Main Palna Jhulau"	
