= Sasural (1941 film) =

- Madhuri and Motilal in Sasural
- Directed by: Chaturbhuj Doshi
- Written by: Gunvantrai Acharya
- Produced by: Ranjit Movietone
- Starring: Motilal; Madhuri; Nur Jehan; Kantilal
- Cinematography: G. G. Gogate
- Music by: Gyan Dutt
- Release date: 1941
- Country: India
- Language: Hindi

Sasural is a Bollywood film. It was released in 1941. The film was directed by Chaturbhuj Doshi for Ranjit Movietone. The story was by Gunvantrai Acharya with dialogues by R. S. Rammyae. Cinematographer was G. G. Gogate with audiography by C. K. Trivedi. Gyan Dutt was the music director, with lyrics by D. N. Madhok. The cast included Motilal, Madhuri, Nurjehan, Miss Iqbal, Kantilal, Tarabai, Bhagwandas, and Urmila.

The film was a romantic comedy about wrongful identification of a groom by his wife-to-be in a household consisting of a father, step-mother step-son some friends and several servants.

== Cast ==
- Motilal
- Madhuri
- Nurjehan
- Kantilal
- Miss Iqbal
- Tarabai
- Bhagwandas
- Urmila
- Popatlal
- Bhim
- Brujmala

== Review ==
Nur Jehan in Sasural

The comedy came from gags which according to the review, "intellectuals would like to forget as stupid", turned out to be the major source of entertainment in the film. Motilal was cited to be good "Motilal scores with ease", and "is the main item of acting in the whole picture". The actress Nur Jehan (not to be confused with singer-actress Noor Jehan) was praised for her singing and acting abilities as the maid "gives quite a thrilling bit of work as the maid".

== Soundtrack ==
The music was composed by Gyan Dutt and notable songs sung by Rajkumari were, "Ik Meethi Nazar Banke" and "Woh Apna Jadu Nigahon Se Azma Rahe Hai". The lyricist was D. N. Madhok and the singers were Motilal, Kantilal, Rajkumari, Nur Jehan, Brijmala, Miss Iqbal.

=== Songlist ===
| # | Title | Singer |
|---|---|---|
| 1 | "Woh Apna Jadu Nigaho Se Azma Rahe Hai" | Rajkumari |
| 2 | "Ik Meethi Nazar Banke" | Rajkumari |
| 3 | "Baala Joban Beet Jaaye" | Iqbal, Brijmala |
| 4 | "Aankho Me Aa Gaye Ho" | Brijmala |
| 5 | "Bhanwara Kara Kaliyo Ko Kare Ishare" | Kantilal, Nur Jehan |
| 6 | "Chalo Sajan Chalo Sajan Dur Kahi Jaaye" | Miss Gulab, Motilal |
| 7 | "Do Rangi Duniya Se Hum Dur" | Kantilal, Nur Jehan |
| 8 | "Is Aankh Me Jadu Hai" | Motilal |
| 9 | "Kaise Kategi Ratiya Tum Waha Hum Yaha" | Motilal, Nur Jehan |
| 10 | "Panghat Se Liye Aati Hu Pani Ka Ghada Me" | Miss Gulab, Sheetal Ghosh |
| 11 | "Tohe Motor Me Baitha Doon" | Motilal, Kantilal |
| 12 | "Bibi Bole Nahi Kunda Khole Nahi" | Chorus |
| 13 | "Kab Rahegi Kanwari Gudiya" | Chorus |
