= Harji Lavji Damani =

Gujarati writer (1892–1962)

- હરજી લવજી દામાણી
- Born: Harji Lavji Damani; 24 October 1892; Pipali, Dhandhuka, Gujarat, India
- Died: 31 May 1962 (aged 69); Mumbai, India
- Education: Standard 4
- Occupations: poet, story writer, novelis, playwright, editor
- Writing career
- Pen name: Shayda
- Language: Gujarati
- Years active: 1912 - 1962
- Notable works: Gulzare-Shayari-Shayda (1961); Dipakna Phool (1965); Chita (1968)

Harji Lavji Damani, better known by his pen name Shayda (24 October 1892 – 31 May 1962) was a Gujarati language poet, novelist, short-story writer and playwright from Gujarat, India. He is known as Ghazal Samrat, the king of ghazal poetry, as he established the Gujarati ghazal form in Gujarati literature.

== Biography ==
Damani was born on 24 October 1892 in Pipli, a village near Dhandhuka, Gujarat to Lavjibhai and Santokbahen. His family belonged to the Islamic Khoja Shia Ishna Asheri community. He studied until the fourth year. In 1912, one of his poems appeared in print for the first time in Bombay Samachar. Subsequently, he started writing ghazals (traditional songs), novels, short stories and plays, including Kumali Kali, which we both wrote and directed. He was the founding editor of the Gujarati weekly magazine Be Ghadi Moj (first issue, 17 August 1924) which established Gujarati ghazal as an independent genre from Urdu ghazal. It closed its publication in 1953. He also served as a subeditor of Ghazal, a Gujarati poetry magazine. He died on 31 May 1962 in Mumbai.

== Works ==
Shayda means 'mad with love' in Urdu.

His works on Gujarati poetry and ghazals include Jay Bharati (1963), Gulzare-Shayri-Shayda (1961), Dipak Na Phool (1965), Chita (1968) and Ashru Chalya Jaay Che (1999). Jay Bharati is a long narrative poem, composed in Dalpatram-style.

His novels include Maa Te Maa (1-2), Amina, Chhelli Roshani (1-2), Bahadurshah Zafar (1-2), Azadini Shama (1-2), Khamma Bhaine (1-2), Dukhiyari, Chandani Raat, Mumataz, Saundaryapuja, Navo Sansar, Jamaanani Zalak, Layla, Bhardariye, Andhari Raat (1-2), Senthima Sindur (1-2), Amanat (1-2), Saabira (1-2), Moti Bhabhi, Vanzari Vaav, Virhaak (1-2), Jyoti Toran, Betho Balavo, Lakshminandan, Dr.Anupam, Shamshire Arab (1-2), Punit Ganga, Lakheni Laaj (1-2), Jivata Soor, Nani Nanadi, Aag Ane Ajavala, Shahzadi Kashmira, Raajahans (1-2), Soorsamadhi (1-2), Dev Dulari (1-2), Hamida, Mayanu Man, Rajeshvari, Raajaba, Anavari, Masooma and Doshiza. His novels deal with social and historical themes. The most famous among his social novels are Maa Te Maa and Moti Bhabhi. Maa Te Maa is a tragic story of love and sacrifice of a mother for her children. Some of his novels dealt with typical communal problems. His well-known novel on this theme, Amaanat was published posthumously. Another tragic novel Masuma described the problems of Islamic culture and religion.

Pankhadio (1938), Amizarana, Kerini Mosam Ane Biji Vaato are his story collections.

He wrote several plays: Sansarnauka (1921) and Karmaprabhav (1922) were produced by Parsi Imperial Natak Mandali; Vasant Veena (1927) produced by Deshi Natak Samaj; Kumali Kali (1926) and Narihriday (1945) produced by Mumbai Gujarati Natak Mandali. His modern play Amar Jyot (1956) was performed in Ahmedabad. His other plays include Pujaar and Koiknu Mindhal Koina Hathe.

His story Vanzari Vaav was adapted into the Gujarati film Kariyavar (1977), directed by Chandrakant Sangani.

== Recognition ==
Shayda was felicitated in Mumbai on 15 April 1957 with an award of Rs. 7000. A road in Mumbai was named after him as Shayda Road in 1968.

In his remembrance, the Indian National Theater gives Shayda Award to a young Gujarati ghazal poet every year.

== See also ==
- List of Gujarati-language writers
