= Gyan Dutt =

- Occupation: Music Director
- Years active: 1937-1965

Gyan Dutt was one of the most prominent music directors in Bollywood in the 1940s. He was music director for films such as The Secretary, Thokar (1939), Achhut (1940), Bhakta Surdas (1942), Sunehre Din (1949) and Ghayal (1951). Many of his songs were sung by K. L. Saigal. In 1948 he composed seven songs for a young Geeta Dutt in the films Chanda Ki Chandani and Hua Savera, although their most notable collaboration was Dilruba (1950) in which Dutt wrote eight songs, six of which were solos for Geeta Dutt.

== Notable songs ==
Notable songs written by Gyan Dutt include:

- "Chandanee Rat Aur Tare Khile Ho" (Bhakt Surdas) Sung by: Khursheed, K L Saigal
- "Din Se Dugunee Ho Jaye Ratiya Hay" (Bhakt Surdas) Sung by: K L Saigal
- "Jholee Bhar Tare La De Re" (Bhakt Surdas) Sung by: Khursheed
- "Kadam Chale Aage Mann Pichhe Bhage" (Bhakt Surdas) Sung by: K L Saigal
- "Madhur Madhur Ga Re Manawa" (Bhakt Surdas) Sung by: Khursheed
- "Meraa Kaha Hai Man Meraa" (Gul-E-Bakaavali) Sung by: Talat Mahmood, P G Krishnaveni
- "More Mann Kee Nagariya Basayee Re" (Kanchan) Sung by: Leela Chitnis, Muzumdar
- "Nain Hi Ko Rah Dikha Prabhu" (Bhakt Surdas) Sung by: K L Saigal
- "Naina Re Dekhe Unake Nain" (Bhakt Surdas) Sung by: Khursheed
- "Nis Din Barsat Nain Hamare" (Bhakt Surdas) Sung by: Mainder, K L Saigal
- "Panchhi Bawara Chand Se Prit Lagaye" (Bhakt Surdas) Sung by: Khursheed
- "Sar Pe Kadam Kee Chainyya Muraliya Baje Ree" (Bhakt Surdas) Sung by: K L Saigal, Rajkumari
- "Woh Gaye Nahee Hame Milke" (Nurse) Sung by: Rajkumari
- "Yaad Teree Aayee Hai" (Nadi Kinaare) Sung by: Gyan Dutt

== Selected films ==
- Gorakh Aya (1938)
- Secretary (1938)
- Aap Ki Marzi (1939)
- Thokar (1939)
- Sant Tulsidas (1939)
- Achhut (1940)
- Chingari (1940)
- Sajani (1940)
- Musafir (1940)
- Beti (1941)
- Sasural (1941)
- Bhakta Surdas (1942)
- Dhiraj
- Anban (1944)
- Manjhdhar (1947)
- Chanda Ki Chandani (1948)
- Hua Savera (1948)
- Sunehre Din (1949)
- Dilruba (1950)
- Ghayal (1951)
- Gul-E-Bakavali (1956)
