= Ranjit Studios =

Indian film production company

Coordinates: 19°04′N 72°52′E

Ranjit Studios, also known as Ranjit Movietone, was an Indian film production company with studio facilities located in Mumbai, Maharashtra, India. It produced films between 1929 and mid-1970s. The studio was founded by Chandulal Shah along with Gohar Kayoum Mamajiwala. It was one of the three largest studios in Bollywood of its time, besides Kohinoor Film Company and Imperial Film Company. According to scholar Tejaswini Ganti, Ranjit was known for producing "mid-budget socials, satires, and stunt-derived mythologicals" and was India's "biggest producer of films until the 1950s".

The company began production of silent films in 1929 under the banner Ranjit Film Company and by 1932 had made 39 pictures, most of them social dramas. The company changed its name to Ranjit Movietone in 1932 and during the 1930s produced numerous successful talkies at the rate of about six a year. At this time, the studio employed around 300 actors, technicians and other employees.

Some of successful film of the studio include The Secretary (1938), Sati Savitri (1932), Gunsundari (1934), Barrister’s Wife (1935), Achhut (1940), Tansen (1943), Moorti (1943) and Jogan (1950).

Ranjit productions were mostly filmed in the Hindi, Punjabi and Gujarati languages. Gujarati films were produced under banner of Ajit Pictures.

The company ended at some time in the late 1960s.

== Filmography ==
- The Secretary (1938)
- Pagal (1940)
- Musafir (1940)
- Sasural (1941)
- Shaadi (1941)
- Bhakt Surdas (1942)
- Armaan (1942)
- Dhiraj (1942)
- Fariyaad (1942)
- Maheman (1942)
- Khilona (1942)
- Bansari (1943)
- Bhanwara (1944)
- Neel Kamal (1947)
- Parasmani (1963)
