= List of Gujarati films =

This is a list of films produced by Gujarati film industry and in Gujarati language. Narsinh Mehta was the first Gujarati language film, released in 1932.

No. of films per year
| Year | No. of films |
|---|---|
| 1932 | 2 |
| 1933 | 0 |
| 1934 | 1 |
| 1935 | 1 |
| 1936 | 3 |
| 1939 | 1 |
| 1940 | 1 |
| 1946 | 1 |
| 1947 | 11 |
| 1948 | 27 |
| 1949 | 17 |
| 1950 | 13 |
| 1951 | 6 |
| 1952 | 2 |
| 1955 | 3 |
| 1956 | 3 |
| 1958 | 1 |
| 1960 | 2 |
| 1961 | 7 |
| 1962 | 5 |
| 1963 | 6 |
| 1964 | 2 |
| 1965 | 5 |
| 1966 | 2 |
| 1967 | 3 |
| 1968 | 3 |
| 1969 | 6 |
| 1970 | 5 |
| 1971 | 2 |
| 1972 | 4 |
| 1973 | 5 |
| 1974 | 7 |
| 1975 | 12 |
| 1976 | 29 |
| 1977 | 30 |
| 1978 | 32 |
| 1979 | 38 |
| 1980 | 34 |
| 1981 | 34 |
| 1982 | 39 |
| 1983 | 27 |
| 1984 | 30 |
| 1985 | 22 |
| 1986 | 13 |
| 1987 | 11 |
| 1988 | 6 |
| 1989 | 9 |
| 1990 | 14 |
| 1991 | 16 |
| 1992 | 5 |
| 1993 | 3 |
| 1994 | 6 |
| 1995 | 9 |
| 1996 | 5 |
| 1997 | 10 |
| 1998 | 15 |
| 1999 | 27 |
| 2000 | 29 |
| 2001 | 12 |
| 2002 | 15 |
| 2003 | 14 |
| 2004 | 13 |
| 2005 | 17 |
| 2006 | 6 |
| 2007 | 16 |
| 2008 | 19 |
| 2009 | 24 |
| 2010 | 65 |
| 2011 | 63 |
| 2012 | 72 |
| 2013 | 18 |
| 2014 | 65 |
| 2015 | 68 |
| 2016 | 45 |
| 2017 | 61 |
| 2018 | 59 |
| 2019 | 45 |
| 2020 | 16 |
| 2021 | 24 |
| 2022 | 78 |
| 2023 | 61 |
| 2024 | 68 |
| 2025 | |

== 1930s ==
- Narsinh Mehta (1932)
- Sansar Leela (1932)
- Sati Savitri (1932)
- Sansar Leela (1934)
- Ghar Jamai (1935)
- Snehlata (1936)
- Be Kharab Jan / Do Diwane (1936)
- Akkal Na Baaradaan (1936)
- Sipahini Sajni (1936)
- Fankdo Fituri (1939)
- Achhoot (1939)

== 1940s ==
1940

- Samajna Vanke (1940)

1946-47

- Ranakdevi (1946)
- Baharvatiyo (1947)
- Bhakta Ambarish (1947)
- Bhakta Surdas (1947)
- Seth Sagalasa (1947)
- Devi Hothal Yane Hothal Padamani (1947)
- Janeta (1947)
- Krishan-Sudama (1947)
- Kunwarbai Nu Mameru (1947)
- Meerabai (1947)
- Narsinh Mehta (1947)
- Sati Jasma (1947)
- Seth Sagalsha (1947)

1948

- Ajamil (1948)
- Bhabhi Na Het (1948)
- Bhai-Bahen (1948)
- Bhakta Prahlad (1948)
- Bhaneli Vahu (1948)
- Gandhiji (1948)
- Gharwali (1948)
- Gunsundari (1948)
- Karanghelo (1948)
- Lagan Na Umedvar (1948)
- Mahasati Ansuya (1948)
- Okhaharan (1948)
- Kariyavar (1948)
- Pruthvi Vallabh (1948)
- Radheshyam (1948)
- Ra Navghan (1948)
- Savaki Ma (1948)
- Sati Son (Halaman Jethvo) (1948)
- Samalsha No Vivah (1948)
- Vadilona Vanke (1948)
- Jesal Toral (1948)
- Jai Ranchhod (1948)
- Jogidas Khuman (1948)
- Nanand Bhojai (1948)
- Satyawadi Harishchandra (1948)
- Sheni Vijanand (1948)
- Jivan Palto (1948)
- Varasdar (1948)

1949

- Vevishal (1949)
- Mangalfera (1949)
- Shethno Salo (1949)
- Bhakta Pundalik (1949)
- Shrikrishna Rukmini (1949)
- Bhakta Puran (1949)
- Gorakh Dhandha (1949)
- Guniyal Gujaratan (1949)
- Mahatma Mooldas (1949)
- Narad Muni (1949)
- Pankaj (1949)
- Raja Bartuhari (1949)
- Sadevant Savlinga (1949)
- Sati Sukanya (1949)
- Satyavan Savitri (1949)
- Seeta Vanvas (1949)
- Vargheli (1949)
- Veenaveli (1949)

== 1950s ==
1950

- Akhand Saubhagya (1950)
- Choodi Chandalo (1950)
- Kahyagaro Kanth (1950)
- Divadandi (1950)
- Lagna Mandap (1950)
- Ramtaram (1950)
- Gadano Bel (1950)
- Gora Kumbhar (1950)
- Jawabdari (1950)
- Mumbaigara (1950)
- Nasibdar (1950)
- Sharad Poonam (1950)
- Var No Bap (1950)
- Bhakta Tulsidas (1950)

1951-59

- Kanyadan (1951)
- Lagna Bandhan (1951)
- Mangal Sutra (1951)
- Paranetar (1951)
- Vadilo No Varso (1951)
- Bhakt Narsainyo (1952)
- Manu Ni Masi (1952)
- Mulu Manek (1955)
- Nag Devta (1955)
- Prem Samadhi (1955)
- Vidhata (1956)
- Malela Jeev (1956)
- Dholamaru (1956)
- Sati Analde (1956)
- Bharat Ni Vani (1958)
- Guru Bhakti (1959)

== 1960s ==
| Title | Director | Genre | Cast | Notes |
|---|---|---|---|---|
1960
| Mendi Rang Lagyo | | | | |
| Kadu Makrani | | | | |
| Dilhi Ni Katha | Rajendra Kumar | Children | Baby Farida, Sushma, Shivraj, Shobha, Sharli, Bela Bose, Soni, Narmadashankar | Musician: Snehal Bhatkar Producer: Balchitra Samiti, Mumbai Dubbed from Delhi Ki Katha (Hindi) |
| Meera Nu Chitra | Kedar Sharma | Children | Baby Farida, Priti, Heeralal, Shobha | Musician: Anil Biswas Producer: Balchitra Samiti, Mumbai Dubbed from Meera Ka Chitra (Hindi) |
1961
| Chundadi Chokha | | | | |
| Ghar Deevdi | | | | |
| Nandanvan | | | | |
| Hiro Salaat | | | | |
| Mahatirth | | | | |
| Narsaiyani Hundi | | | | |
| Ra Mandlik | | | | |
| Savitri | | | | |
| Veer Ramwalo | | | | |
1962
| Jogidas Khuman | | | | |
| Jay Bhadrakali | | | | |
| Janam Janam Na Sathi | | | | |
| Kanku Ane Kanya | | | | |
| Satyamev Jayate | | | | |
1963
| Gharni Shobha | | | | |
| Jeevno Jugari | | | | |
| Jevi Chhu Tevi | | | | |
| Laakho Vanzaro | | | | |
| Vanraj Chavdo | | | | |
| Satyavan Savitri | | | | |
1964
| Akhand Saubhagyavati | | | | |
| Ramat Ramade Ram | | | | |
| Kutara Ni Katha | | | | |
| Raju Ane Gangaram | | | | |
1965
| Anmol Moti | | | | |
| Panetar | | | | |
| Kasumbino Rang | | | | |
| Chhogala Chhaganlal No Varghodo | | | | |
| Jamairaj | | | | |
| Sant Shiromani | | | | |
1966
| Kalapi | | | | |
| Moti Baa | | | | |
1967
| Samay Varte Savdhaan | | | | |
| Gujaratan | | | | |
| Mota Gharni Dikari (Sneh Bandhan) | | | | |
| Samay Varte Savdhan | | | | |
1968
| Liludi Dharati | | | | |
| Mare Jaavu Pele Paar | | | | |
| Maadi Mane Kahevaa De | | | | |
1969
| Kanku | | | | |
| Bahuroopi | | | | |
| Sansar Leela | | | | |
| Majiyara Haiya | | | | |
| Hasta Melap | | | | |
| Vidhi Na Lekh | | | | |

== 1970s ==
1970

- Jigar ane Ami (1970)
- Veline Avya Phool (1970)
- Dharati Na Chhoru (1970)
- Maa Te Maa (1970)
- Heera Nu Patangiyu (1970)
- Jawab Aavshe (1970)
- Sanskar (1970)

1971

- Jesal Toral (1971)
- Upar Gagan Vishal (1971)
- Ghunghat (1971)

1972

- Gunsundarino Gharsansar (1972)
- Jher To Pidhan Jaani Jaani (1972)
- Kumkum Pagla (1972)
- Bharat Darshan (1972)
- Parivar (1972)

1973

- Raja Bharathari (1973)
- Kadu Makrani (1973)
- Janamteep (1973)
- Ranakdevi (1973)
- Valo Namori (Vala Taro Deshma Danko) (1973)

1974

- Amdavad No Rikshawalo (1974)
- Amar Premi Sheni Vijanand (1974)
- Hothal-Padmani (1974)
- Kunwarbai nu Mameru (1974)
- Harishchandra Taramati (1974)
- Veer Abhal Valo (1974)
- Ghunghat (1974)
- Jai Shree Ram (1974)
- Ranuja Na Raja Ramdev (1974)
- Jai Ranchhod (1974)

1975

- Jogidas Khuman (1975)
- Mena Gurjari (1975)
- Lakha Loyan (1975)
- Parbhav ni Preet (1975)
- Raa Maandlik (1975)
- Shetal Ne Kanthe (1975)
- Sant Surdas (1975)
- Sheth Sagalsha (1975)
- Jai Ranchhod (1975)
- Tanariri (1975)
- Veer Champaraj Valo (1975)
- Okha Haran (1975)

- Kanchan Ane Ganga (1975)

1976

- Baba Ramdev Pir (1976)
- Balkrishan Leela (1976)
- Bhabhi (1976)
- Bhadar Tara Vehata Paani (1976)
- Bhaibandhi (1976)
- Chundadi No Rang (1976)
- Daku Rani Ganga (1976)
- Dharti Mata (1976)
- Jalamsang Jadeja (1976)
- Jai Khodiyarma (1976)
- Khamma Mara Veera (1976)
- Khermo Lodan (1976)
- Khola No Khundnar (1976)
- Lakho Phulani (1976)
- Ma Amba Gabbarwali (1976)
- Madi Na Jaya (1976)
- Malavpati Munj (1976)
- Ra'Navghan (1976)
- Rakhwala Mare Ghanshyamna (1976)
- Santu Rangili (1976)
- Sati Jasma Odan (1976)
- Sat Na Parkha (1976)
- Shamalsha No Vivah (1976)
- Sonbai Ni Chundadi (1976)
- Sorathi Sinh (1976)
- Veer Abhal Vallo (1976)
- Vir Mangdavalo (1976)
- Vir Ramvalo (1976)
- Ver no Varas (1976)
- Ame Pardesi Paan (1976)

1977

- Bhrashtachar Murdabad (1977)
- Chandu Jamadar (1977)
- Dada Ho Dikari (1977)
- Doctor Rekha (1977)
- Gher Gher Matina Chula (1977)
- Halaman Jethvo (Sati Son) (1977)
- Jai Randal Maa (1977)
- Jai Shree Yamuna Maharani (1977)
- Janam Janam Na Saathi/Phir Janam Lenge Hum (1977)
- Kariyavar(1977)
- Khapro Zaveri(1977)
- Krupa Santoshimani(1977)
- Kulvadhu (1977)
- Lakheni Laj
- Ma Bap
- Ma Evarat Jevarat (1977)
- Mari Hel Utaro Raj (1977)
- Manno Manigar (1977)
- Mulu Manek (1977)
- Paiso Bole Chhe (1977)
- Rupande Malade (1977)
- Sadavant Savlinga (1977)
- Saubhagya Sindoor (1977)
- Shravani Satam (1977)
- Shri Krishna Sharanam Mam (1977)
- Sole Sajya Shangar (1977)
- Son Kansari (1977)
- Sorathiyani Son (Sati Sonal) (1977)
- Sonano Suraj (1977)
- Vanzari Vav (1977)

1978

- Chundadi Odhi Tara Naam Ni (1978)
- Dada Khetrapal (1978)
- Manek Thumbh (1978)
- Patli Parmar (1978)
- Jai Khodiar Maa (1978)
- Man No Manigar (1978)
- Gharsansar (1978)
- Ver Ni Vasulat (1978)
- Visamo (1978)
- Miya Fuski 007 (1978)
- Nari Tu Narayani (1978)
- Mota Gharni Vahu (1978)
- Kanchan Ane Ganga (1978)
- Bhagat Gora Kumbhar (1978)
- Bhagyalaxmi (1978)
- Tamere Champone Ame Kel (1978)
- Gomtini Sakhe (1978)
- Maa Dikri (1978)
- Pati Parmeshwar (1978)
- Sati Sorath (1978)
- Ashapura Matani Chundadi (1978)
- Chandan Maliyagiri (1978)

1979

- Amarsinh Rathod (1979)
- Garvo Garasiyo (1979)
- Kunwari Satino Kesari Kanth (1979)
- Lalwadi Phoolwadi (1979)
- Navrang Chundadi (1979)
- Rupli Datanwali (1979)
- Tame Re Champo Ne Ame Kel (1979)
- Bhathiji Maharaj (1979)
- Kashino Dikro (1979)
- Preet Khandani Dhar (1979)
- Gangasati (1979)
- Rang Rasiya (1979)
- Sona Indhoni Rupa Bedlun (1979)
- Suraj Chandrani Sakhe (1979)
- Vahue Vagovya Mota Khorda (1979)
- Veer Pasali (1979)
- Aapo Jadro (1979)
- Paraki Thapan (1979)
- Jai Bhadrakali (1979)
- Dikri Ane Gai Dore Tiva Jaye (1979)
- Koinu Mindhal Koina Hathe (1979)
- Sonba Ane Roopba (1979)
- Shankar Parvati (1979)
- Ashaati Beej (1979)
- Rajputani (1979)
- Peethino Rang (1979)

== 1980s ==
1980

- Bhavni Bhavai (1980)
- Akhand Chudlo (1980)
- Vaya Viramgam (1980)
- Khordani Khandani (1980)
- Alakhne Otle (1980)
- Lohini Sagaai (1980)
- Jog Sanjog (1980)
- Saurashtrano Sinh - Chhelbhai (1980)
- Chitadano Chor (1980)
- Jivi Rabaran (1980)
- Kesar Kathiyani (1980)
- Koino Ladakvayo (1980)
- Namni Nagarvel (1980)
- Sorathni Padmini (1980)
- Kesudano Rang (1980)
- Karo Kankuna (1980)
- Gangapurni Ganga (1980)
- Bhakta Pipaji (1980)
- Diyar Bhojai (1980)
- Maniyaro (1980)
- Sau Dahada Sasuna To Ek Dahado Vahuno (1980)
- Parayana To Pyaara Ladi (1980)
- Meru Mulande (1980)
- Aman Laxmi (1980)
- Veerangana Naathibai (1980)

1981

- Alakh Niranjan (1981)
- Aman Laxmi (1981)
- Albeli Naar (1981)
- Bhav Bhavna Bheru (1981)
- Gamdani Gori (1981)
- Gajara Maru (1981)
- Dukhda Khame Dikri (1981)
- Jagya Tyarthi Sawar (1981)
- Amar Devidas (1981)
- Bhav Bhavna Bheru (1981)
- Mehulo Luhar (1981)
- Sheth Jagadusha (1981)
- Vansali Vagi Valamni (1981)
- Garvi Naar Gujaratan (1981)
- Chhel Chabili Sonal (1981)
- Vat Vachan Ne Ver (1981)
- Naag Pancham (1981)
- Rano Kunwar (1981)
- Vaheta Aansu Vahu Na (1981)
- Ranchandi (1981)

1982

- Charotarni Champa (1982)
- Sant Rohidas (1982)
- Ma Vina Suno Sansar (1982)
- Parki Thapan (1982)
- Retina Ratan (1982)
- Kharakharino Khel (1982)
- Jugal Jodi (1982)
- Jaya Parvati Vrat (1982)
- Jawanina Zer (1982)
- Dholi (1982)
- Dharmo (1982)
- Jamna Bani Jagdamba (1982)
- Putra Vadhu (1982)
- Rasta No Raja (1982)
- Naseeb No Khel (1982)
- Rani Rikshawali (1982)
- Prem Diwani (1982)
- Tran Teniya Chha Chhabila Baharvatiya (1982)/Bachche Teen Aur Daku Chhe
- Prem Lagna (1982)

1983

- Dodh Dahya (1983)
- Heero Ghoghe Jai Avyo (1983)
- Jawabdar (1983)
- Kankuni Kimat (1983)
- Lohinu Tilak (1983)
- Kurukshetra (1983)
- Vachhada Dadani Dikri (1983)
- Rakh Na Ramakda (1983)
- Dhola Maru (1983)
- Maa Koini Marsho Nahi (1983)
- Ver Na Valamna (1983)
- Saacho Sukh Saasariyama (1983)
- Marad No Mandvo (1983)
- Sampoorna Mahabharat (1983)
- Maa Koini Marsho Nahi (1983)

1984

- Dharatina Ami (1984)
- Mali Methan (1984)
- Manasaina Diva (1984)
- Machchhu Tara Vaheta Pani (1984)
- Nagmati Nagvalo (1984)
- Sajan Sonalde (1984)
- Maana Aansu (1984)
- Maa Mane Sambhare Chhe (1984)
- Hiranne Kanthe (1984)
- Aankhna Ratan (1984)
- Nana Vagar No Nathiyo (1984)
- Sindoorthapa (1984)
- Ram Doohai (1984)
- Tulasi Vivah (1984)

1985

- Dikri Chali Sasariye (1985)
- Meru Malan (1985)
- Malo Naagde (1985)
- Maanu Mangalsutra (1985)
- Vifreli Vaghan (1985)
- Preet Na Karsho Koi (1985)
- Sorathno Savaj (1985)
- Palavade Bandhi Preet (1985)

1986

- Lohi Bhini Chundadi (1986)
- Shetal Tara Oonda Paani (1986)
- Kanyaviday (1986)
- Bhabhina Het (1986)
- Sayba Mora (1986)
- Ujali Meraman (1986)
- Maro Rasiyo Saajan (1986)
- Sougandh Tari Rakhadina (1986)

1987

- Maa Dasha Maa (1987)
- Moti Verana Chawk Ma (1987)

1988

- Ramapir (1988)
- Sol Somwar (1988)

1989

- Satyavadi Raja Harishchandra (1989)
- Mahisagarne Aare (1989)
- Maa Khodal Taro Khamkaro (1989)
- Percy (1989)

== 1990s ==
1990

- Shetal Tara Unda Pani (1990)
- Sabar Tara Vehta Pani (1990)
- Veer Bawavalo (1990)
- Madhavpur Ne Mele (1990)

1991

- Premna Bandhan (1991)
- Bhadarne Kanthe (1991)
- Parki Jani (1991)
- Radha Ghelo Kan (1991)
- Zoolan Morali (1991)

1992

- Hun Hunshi Hunshilal (1992)
- Parivaar Na Pankhi (1992)
- Bhadar Ne Kanthe (1992)
- Hun Hunshi Hunshilal (1992)

1993

- Manvini Bhavai (1993)
- Geetanjali (1993)

1994

- Aapna Malak Na Mayalu Manvi (1994)
- Zadpi Lido (1994)

1997

- Oonchi Medina Ooncha Mol (1997)
- Parbhavni Preet (1997)
- Kanto Vagyo Kalje (1997)
- Preet Pangare Chori Chori (1997)
- Mehandi Rang Lagyo (1997)
- Mahendi Lili Ne Rang Rato (1997)
- Raj Ratan (1997)

1998

- Mahisagarna Moti (1998)
- Hu Tu Ne Ramtudi (1998)
- Desh Re Joya Dada Pardesh Joya (1998)
- Nano Diyariyo Ladko (1998)
- Dholo Mara Malak No (1998)
- Vat No Katko (1998)

1999

- Bhai Ni Beni Ladki (1999)
- Dikro Maro Ladakvayo (1999)
- Dada Ne Vahali Dikari (1999)
- Dikari Mari Vahal No Dariyo (1999)
- Dariya Chhoru (1999)
- Pandadu Lilu Ne Rang Rato (1999)
- Man Sayba Ni Mediye (1999)
- Moti Na Chowkre Sapna Man Ditha (1999)
- Gam Ma Piyariyu Ne Gam Ma Sasariyu (1999)
- Aanganiya Sajavo Raaj (1999)

== 2000s ==
2000

- Daldu Chorayu Dhire Dhire (2000)
- Ghar Ghunghat Ne Gharcholu (2000)
- Saacho Sathvaro Saajano (2000)
- Chundadi Ni Laaj (2000)
- Mota Ghar Ni Laaj (2000)
- Sajan Haiye Sambhare (2000)
- Bhad No Dikaro (2000)
- Piyo Gayo Pardesh (2000)
- Mena Popat (2000)
- Ghar Ek Pankhi No Malo (2000)
- Dalda Lidha Chori Raj (2000)
- Ooncha Khordani Khandani (2000)
- The Trip (2000)
- Dikari Toh Parki Thapan Kehvay (2000)
- Sajan Vina Suno Sansar (2000)
- Daldu Chorayu Dhire Dhire (2000)
- Palav Bhini Preet (2000)
- Bhav Bhav Na Bharthar (2000)
- Maa Tara Haiya Na Het (2000)

2001

- Maiyar Ma Mandu Nathi Lagtu (2001)
- Khodiyar Chhe Jogmaya (2001)
- Taro Malak Mare Jovo Chhe (2001)

2002

- Beni Hun to Baar Baar Varshe Aaviyo (2002)
- Rangai Jaa Ne Rang Ma (2002)
- Dikri Dolariya Desh Ni (2002)
- Narmada Tara Vahi Jata Pani (2002)
- Dharti No Chhedo Ghar (2002)
- Daladu Lagyu Sayba Na Desh Ma (2002)
- 150 Seconds Ago (2002)

2003

- Dhudki Taari Maya Laagi (2003)
- Mandavda Ropavo Mana Raj (2003)
- Chundadi Odhu Ne Sajan Sambhare (2003)
- Toran Bandhao Ho Raaj (2003)

2004

- Raaj Mata (2004)
- Monghera Mulni Chundadi Ho Saiba (2004)
- Mane Lai De Ne Navrang Chundadi (2004)
- Ma Dashama Rakjo Mari Chundi Ni Laj (2004)
- Gujarat No Lal (2004)
- Aasude Bhinjay Gharchodu Aasude Bhinjay Chundadi (2004)

2005

- Love Is Blind (2005)
- Gam Ma Piyariyu Ne Gam Ma Sasariyu (2005)
- Muratiyo No. 1 (2005)
- Madi Jaya (2005)
- Dukhda Haro Maa Dasha Maa (2005)
- Mane Samne Sajan Sambhare (2005)
- Gago ke Dada nu Painu Painu Karto to (2005)
- Sejal Sarju (2005)
- Mein to Palavade Bandhi Preet (2005)

2006

- Ek Var Piyu Ne Malva Aavje (2006)
- Muthi Uchero Manas (2006)
- Maher Karo Maa Meladi (2006)
- Dikro Kahu ke dev (2006)
- Jagat Jogini Maa Khodiyar (2006)

2007

- Radha Tara Vina Gamtu Nathi (2007)
- Vanechandno Varghodo (2007)
- Halo Manviyu Na Mele (2007)
- Sasu Ye Jamai Ne Phatkaryo (2007)
- Sneh Na Sagpan (2007)
- Nedalo Nibhavo Mari Nandina Veer (2007)
- Bewafa Pardeshi (2007)
- Prem Gori Taro Kem Kari Bhulay (2007)
- Nahi Re Lajavu Tari Chundadi(2007)
- Mangudi Manti Nathi (2007)
- Veer Vihal (2007)
- Chotile Bethie Maa Chamunda (2007)
- Ahmedabad Palanpur Via Kadi Kalol (2007)
- Dakor Na Thakor (2007)
- Mota Ghar Ni Vahu (2007)
- Driver Dilwalo (2007)

2008

- Better Half (2008)
- Maiyar Ma Mandu Nathi Lagtu Part-II (2008)
- Mota Gharni Vahu (2008)
- Dukhda Haro Ma Dashama (2008)
- Dholi Taro Dhol Vage (2008)
- The Boatmaker (2008)
- Mota Gharna Maan (2008)
- Chanakya Ni Chelli Chaal (2008)
- Preet Na Karsho Pardeshi Ne (2008)
- Mindhol Chhutya Mandave (2008)
- Mahisagar Na Saugandh (2008)
- Ramat Ramadye Rupiyo (2008)
- Taare Maare Prit Chhe Gori (2008)
- Alakh Na Ajwala (2008)
- Radha Tara Vina Mane Gamtu Nathi (2008)
- Preet Mandi Khodal Tare Dhaam (2008)
- Vhare Aavo Maa Vaibhav Lakshmi (2008)
- Mara Maan Chogada Dhola (2008)
- Akhand Saubhagyavati (2008)

2009

- Little Zizou (2009)
- Harun Arun (2009)
- Have Mare Hira Nathi Ghasva (2009)
- Swarg Thi Sunder Gujarat (2009)
- Dikri Hoy to Rakhe Kul Ni Laaj (2009)
- Kana Kem Re Bhulavi Mari Preet (2009)
- Mane Laija Tara Malak Maa (2009)
- Rakhopa Mari Ambe Maa Na (2009)
- Sahiyar Ni Chundadi (2009)
- Dharti No Chhedo Ghar (2009)
- Ek Vaar Mara Malak Ma Aavjo (2009)
- Sajan Tarsi Preet (2009)
- Chhogala Chhagan No Varghodo (2009)
- Bandhan (2009)
- Ame re lutaya tari preet ma (2009)
- Veer Bhathiji Maharaj (2009)
- Main to Odhi Chundadi Tara Naam Ni (2009)
- Sari Dikri Sasariye Shobhe (2009)
- Tane Parki Manu Ke Manu Potani (2009)
- Sasriye Lila Leher Che (2009)
- Radha Mara Rudiyani Ni Rani (2009)
- Maiyar No Mandvo Preet Nu Panetar (2009)
- Preet Janmo Janam Ni Bhulashe Nahi (2009)
- Gori Pagal Thayo Hu Tara Prem Ma (2009)

== 2010s ==
2010

- Chetarpindi (2010)
- Bhule Na Bhulay Sayba Tari Preet (2010)
- Vaagi Kalje Katari Tara Premni (2010)
- Piyu Tara Vina Mane Eklu Lage (2010)
- Bhalawala Mari Bhere Rejo (2010)
- Radha Chudlo Perje Mara Naam No (2010)
- Parnetar Ni Preetadi (2010)
- Main to Haiye Lakhyu Sajan Taru Naam (2010)
- Ame Prem Deewana (2010)
- Mara Rudiye Rangana Tame Saajana (2010)
- Veran Thayo Re Maro Vaydo (2010)
- Prit Piyu Ne Parnetar (2010)
- Sacha Re Shamna Mara Saajan Na (2010)
- Jay Vijay (2010)
- Preet Bhari Odhani (2010)
- Vagi Kalje Katari Tara Premni (2010)
- Tari Ne Mari Jodi Che RadheShyam Ni (2010)
- Sahabuddin Rather Na Hasya Na (2010)
- Tu to Sajan Mara Kadje Korani (2010)
- Mohan Na Monkiz (2010)
- Sawariya lai de ho rangni chudi (2010)
- Janmdaata (2010)
- Dhamachakari (2010)
- Gor Bapa No Gotalo (2010)

2011

- Premi Zukya Nathi ne Zukshe Nahi (2011)
- Chaar (2011)
- Jai Shree Veer Baba Deo (2011)
- Hu Tari Meera Ne Tu Maro Shyam Re (2011)
- Rajveer Rahasmay Prem katha (2011)
- Dalda Didha Ne Preet Re Bandhani (2011)
- Saathi Re Saath Na Chute (2011)
- Ucha Kotde Betha Maa Chandi Chamunda (2011)
- Gujarat No Nath (2011)
- Premi Jhukya Nathi Ne Jhukshe Nahi (2011)
- Preet Jhuke Nahi Saath Chhute Nahi (2011)
- Garibni Dikri Sasriya Ma Thikri (2011)

2012

- Veer Hamirji (2012)
- Kevi Rite Jaish (2012)
- Bhale Padharya (2012)
- Neelkanth (2012)
- Aakha Jag Thi Nirali Mari Saajna (2012)
- Desh Pardesh (2012)
- Pardesh Ek Sapanu (2012)
- Dhinga Masti Dhammachakdi (2012)
- Vidhata (2012)
- Shikaar A Murder Mystery (2012)
- Preet Na Saugandh (2012)
- Mandwani Jui (2012)
- To Karo Shree Ganesh (2012)
- Sajan Tari Prit (2012)
- Mama Nu Ghar Ketle (2012)

2013

- Saptapadii (2013)
- Happy Familyy Pvt Ltd (2013)
- The Good Road (2013)
- Lagyo Kasumbi No Rang (2013)
- Ghayal (2013)
- Haa Hun Dikari No Baap (2013)
- Tu Maro Kaun Lage (2013)
- Mr.Avtar (2013)
- Prem Na Dushman (2013)
- Suhagan Shobhe Sasariye (2013)
- The Advocate (2013)
- Meghdhanusya - The Colour of Life (2013)
- Shakti the Power (2013)
- Chundadi Na Sathvare (2013)
- Teenagers Gang (2013)
- Gori Prem Kare to Hacho Karje (2013)
- Patan Thi Pakistan (2013)
- Maa Baap Na Aashirwad (2013)

=== Lists ===
- List of Gujarati films of 2014
- List of Gujarati films of 2015
- List of Gujarati films of 2016
- List of Gujarati films of 2017
- List of Gujarati films of 2018
- List of Gujarati films of 2019

== 2020s ==
=== Lists ===
- List of Gujarati films of 2020
- List of Gujarati films of 2021
- List of Gujarati films of 2022
- List of Gujarati films of 2023
- List of Gujarati films of 2024
- List of Gujarati films of 2025
- List of Gujarati films of 2026

== See also ==
- Gujarati cinema
- List of highest-grossing Gujarati films
