= Jogidas Khuman (disambiguation) =

Jogidas Khuman was an Indian outlaw.

Jogidas Khuman may also refer to:

- Jogidas Khuman (1948 film), a 1948 Indian Gujarati-language film directed by Manhar Raskapur
- Jogidas Khuman (1962 film), a 1962 Indian Gujarati-language film directed by Manhar Raskapur
- Jogidas Khuman (1975 film), a 1975 Indian Gujarati-language film directed by Manhar Raskapur

== See also ==
- Jogi (disambiguation)
- Ghuman (disambiguation)
