= Kadu Makrani =

Indian revolutionary (c.1841–1887)

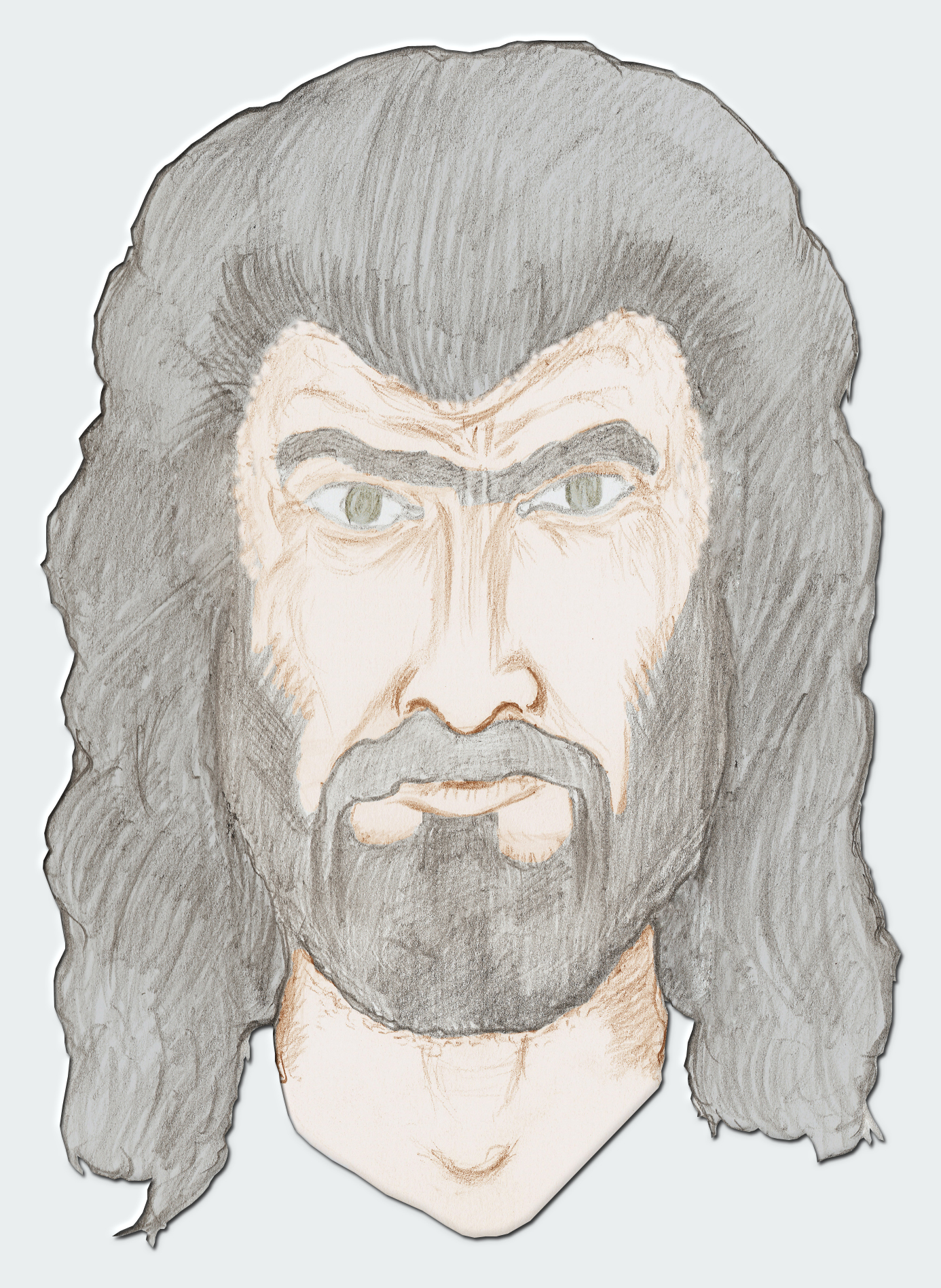
- Imaginary sketch of Kadu Makrani
- Born: c. 1841; Makran, Balochistan, Company India
- Died: 5 June 1887 (aged 45–46); Karachi, Sind Division, Bombay Presidency, British India
- Cause of death: Execution by hanging
- Resting place: Mewah Shah Graveyard 24°53′08.6″N 67°00′39″E
- Occupation: Revolutionary

Qadir Baksh Rind Baloch (famously known as Kadu Makrani; c. 1841 — 5 June 1887) was a 19th-century Indian revolutionary who operated mainly in Kathiawar region of Gujarat but was born and raised in Makran. He is famously known for opposing and resisting British rule and rule by the upper class of Gujarat in favor of the rights of the poor lower class.

== Biography ==
=== Conflict with the British ===
Kadu Makrani migrated with his tribe from his birthplace Makran to Vadal near Junagadh in Gujarat. during the mid-19th century. Makrani and his tribe fought for territories and resources, receiving tribute from the rulers of Kathiawar princely states in return. This troubled the British colonial authorities, who sought to disarm his tribe; a justification was given when Makrani and his tribe rejected colonial government social workers entering their homes on the pretence of registration and census in 1881. Given the option of armistice or dissension, the tribe rebelled. Makrani's small army, with civilian support, engaged in conflict with the colonial military and made them suffer many casualties. The colonial military ultimately failed to capture Makrani's army, so they announced a bounty of Rs 1,000/- and a 20-acre (81,000 m2) land reward for his capture.

=== Return home ===
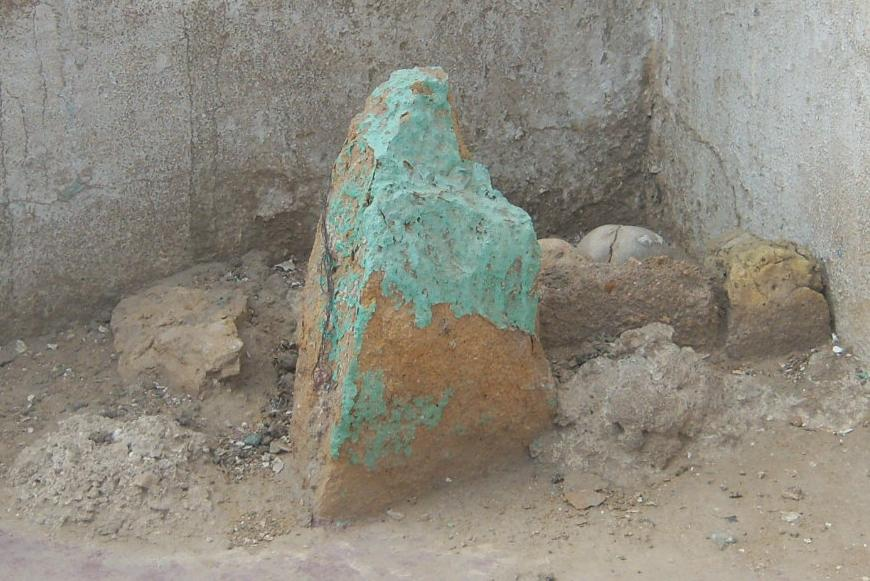
The stone dropped on Makrani, preserved next to his grave.

In April 1887, Makrani's companions suggested returning to Makran to avoid arrest by police in Kathiawar. Accepting the advice, Kadu Makrani along with the rest of his tribe moved to Ahmedabad and then Sindh. A camel-herder agreed to transport him to Makran, but he actually planned to betray him and then kill him in return for the bounty reward; However, when he attacked Makrani, he was overwhelmed by Makrani's superior sword fighting skills and Makrani eventually slew him and fled. Makrani was later captured unconscious after being hit and then knocked out by a falling stone due to a landslide in the Kirthar Mountains on 20 April. After a short trial, he was sentenced to death.

== Death ==
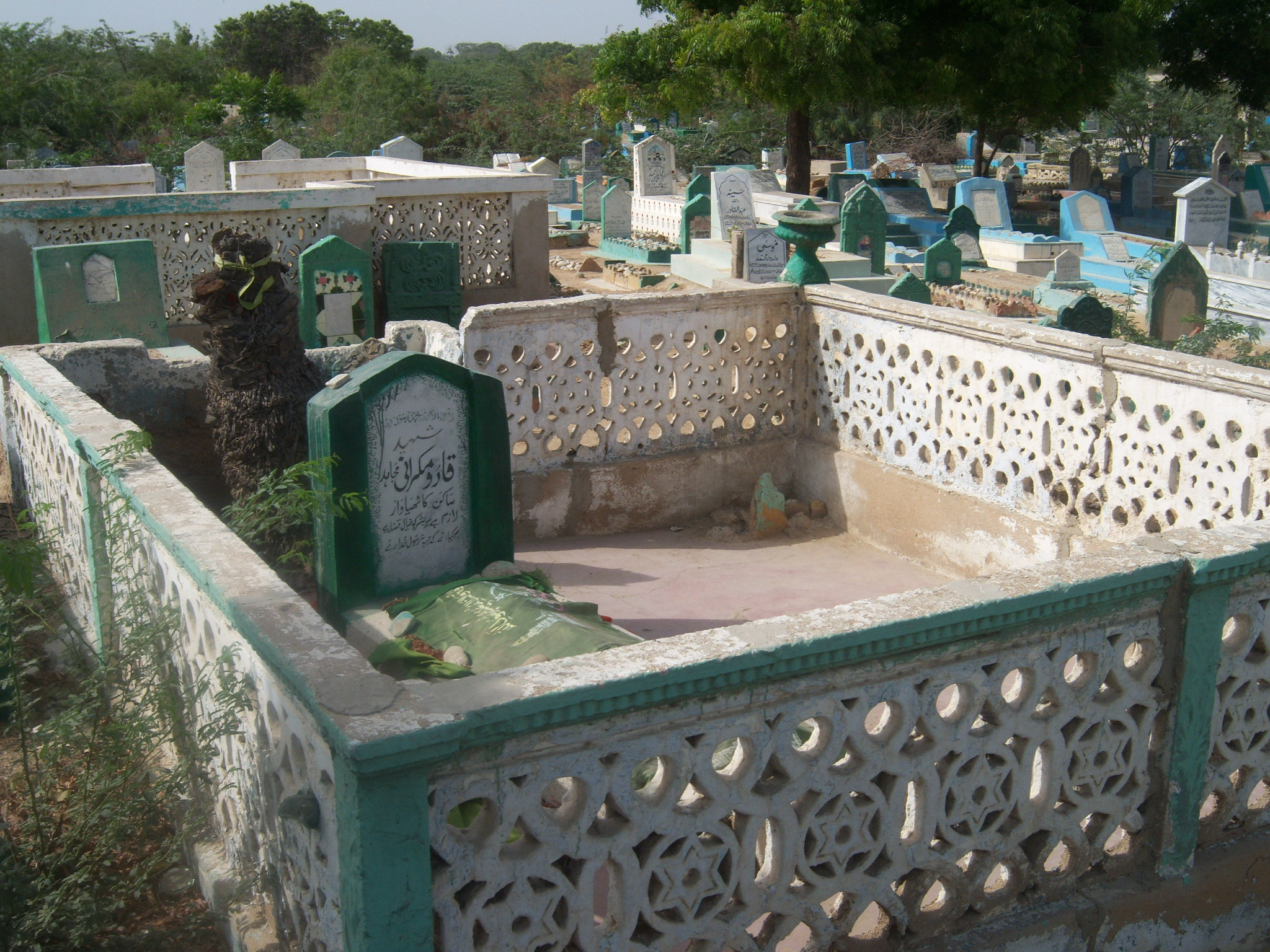
Final resting place of Kadu Makrani

Makrani was executed at Karachi Central Jail on 5 June 1887. He was buried at Mewah Shah Graveyard.

== In popular culture ==
The 1960 Gujarati film Kadu Makrani directed by Manhar Raskapur starred Arvind Pandya in the lead role of Makrani. The film was remade in 1973 in Gujarati by Manu Desai. In 1966, Pakistani film Jaag Utha Insan was produced based on his life.
