= Jogidas Khuman =

Jagirdar and an outlaw in Kathiawar

- Jagirdar
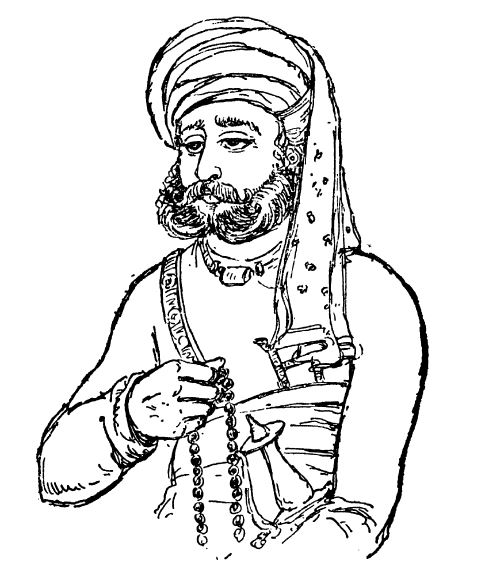
- Illustration of Jogidas Khuman in Sorathi Baharvatiya by Jhaverchand Meghani
- Born: Kundla
- Died: Ambaradi (Khuman)
- Issue: Harsur Khuman; Lakha Khuman; Kamaribai
- Dynasty: Kathi
- Father: Hada Khuman

Jogidas Khuman (Gujarati: જોગીદાસ ખુમાણ) was a Kathi Jagirdar of Kundla (now Savarkundla) who resorted to outlawry to resist the Bhavnagar State in Kathiawar, in present-day state of Gujarat, during early 19th century. He successfully led the Khuman resistance against expansionist policies of Bhavnagar State during the reign of Thakor Wakhatsinh and later his son Wajesinh Gohil.

== Early life ==
Jogidas was born to Hada Khuman of Kundla, who along with his six brothers, succeeded Jagirdari of Kundla Chorasi (eighty four villages of Kundla), following the death of their father, Ala Khuman. The Kundla jagir had originally been conquered by Samat Khuman, the father of Ala and great-grandfather of Jogidas.

The story of Jogidas Khuman is described in the historical ballad of Indian poet and writer Jhaverchand Meghani in his work Sorathi Baharvatiya Bhaag-2. Meghani claims that Ala Khuman had nine sons.

== Family tree ==
Family tree of Khuman Jagirdars of Kundla

Samat Khuman
Ala Khuman
Bhoj Khuman | Mulu Khuman | Hada Khuman | Luna Khuman | Sura Khuman | Vira Khuman
Jogidas Khuman | Bhan Khuman | Gela Khuman

== Conflict with Bhavanagar State ==
Following Ala Khuman's death in 1784, a dispute arose among his six sons over the division of territory. Amid this conflict, Bhoja Khuman, the eldest son, ceded a portion of his territory to Wakhatsinh, the ruler of Bhavnagar at the time, in exchange for his support and protection against his brothers. Wakhatsinh deployed troops to garrison the town and safeguard Bhoja's interests. However, the other five brothers successfully repelled the Bhavnagar forces. Two of the brothers then made a similar offer to the Nawab of Junagadh State, seeking protection against Mulu Khuman. Mulu Khuman, in turn, managed to drive back the Junagadh force. In 1790, Wakhatsinh, seeing an opportunity in this turmoil, arrived with a large army to seize the control of Kundla. After two days of fighting, Wakhatsinh forcefully entered Kundla. Khumans dispersed in all directions and resorted to outlawry. Wakhatsinh died in 1816, and his son, Wajesinh, ascended to the throne.

== Outlawry ==
Hada Khuman together with his three sons—Jogidas, Bhan, and Gela Khuman— spearheaded the Khuman resistance against Bhavanagar. After Hada Khuman’s death in the battle of Ghugharala, Jogidas assumed leadership of the bund. Between 1820 and 1829, he conducted plundering raids across Bhavnagar State, severely disrupting Kundla and other regions of the state. These actions necessitated significant military expenditure by the state to suppress the rebellion.

In 1822, his wife and children were placed under house arrest in the Bhavanagar royal palace as a means of pressuring him to surrender.

He killed Ananadji, the Deewan of Bhavnagar, who had pledged to capture him alive.

== Settlement ==
In 1822, Sevakram Rajaram Desai was appointed Karbhari with the special duty of quelling the Khuman outlawry. He resigned in 1828 due to old age was succeeded by Samaldas Parmananddas.

In 1824, a group of Kathis turned Jogidas over to Captain Barnewell, then Political Agent in Rajkot, to devise a settlement, though the efforts failed and Jogidas continued outlawry. Wajesinh subsequently requested Dada Khachar of Gadhada to convince Jogidas for permanent peace settlement.

In March 1828, D. A. Blane, then Political Agent in Rajkot, issued peremptory orders to Kathi Talukdars of Jetpur, Jasdan and others to deliver up the Khuman outlaws. Talukdars delivered outlaws to political agents with their securities. Wajesinh offered the return of Kundla to Jogidas but he refused to accept. Khumans surrendered some of their original Jagir to compensate for the damages inflicted on the state. He was given Ambaradi and a few villages as Jagir.

== Legacy ==
He is noted for an act of self-punishment in which he reportedly rubbed chili powder into his eyes after gazing at a beautiful woman. He abstained from attending Mujra. Swaminarayan regarded him as a Jati, an individual who had embraced an ascetic or renunciative path.

He rescued Naniba, the queen of Wajesinh, from a thief named Ragho Chavdo of Akadia, safely escorting her back to Bhavnagar.

His truthfulness was recognized by the Bhavnagar State, despite their enmity. Bhavnagar agreed to his mediation in settling the border dispute between the Amreli Prant of Baroda State and Bhavnagar State.

He killed Sindhi troops of Bhavnagar for hunting and eating the holy peacock of a Mohammedan saint.

== In popular culture ==
=== Books ===
- 1928: Sorathi Baharvatiya Bhaag-2, a book authored by Jhaverchand Meghani, includes a depiction of Jogidas Khuman’s story.

=== Film ===
The 1948 film Jogidas Khuman (remade in 1962 and 1975) was an Indian Gujarati-language film directed by Manhar Raskapur. It featured Arvind Pandya as Jogidas in 1948 and 1962, and Arvind Trivedi in 1975. The film is considered a "Gujarati devotional film with a clear socially revolutionary message."

=== Miscellaneous ===
- 1965: Narendra Modi played the role of Jogidas during a drama event in his school.

== See also ==
- Kathi dynasty
