= Jogidas Khuman (1962 film) =

- Directed by: Manhar Raskapur
- Written by: Gunvantrai Acharya (screenplay)
- Produced by: B. D. Bharucha, Govindbhai Desai, Babubhai Desai, Harishbhai Patel, Dhirubhai Desai
- Starring: P. Jairaj; Arvind Pandya; Urmila Bhatt; Aruna; Babu Raje
- Music by: Avinash Vyas
- Production companies: Mangalam Chitra, Mumbai
- Release date: 1962
- Running time: 137 Min
- Country: India
- Language: Gujarati

Jogidas Khuman (Gujarati: જોગીદાસ ખુમાણ) is a 1962 Indian Gujarati social drama film directed by Manhar Raskapur.

== Plot ==
The story of the film is based on true events. Jogidas Khuman was the Kathi Darbar of Ambardi (now in Savarkundla). When the Durbar of Bhavnagar, Vajesingh, took back the villages given to his ancestors, he and his father Hada Khuman had rebelled against Bhavnagar State.

== Cast ==
The principal cast is as follows:

- P. Jairaj
- Arvind Pandya
- Urmila Bhatt
- Aruna
- Babu Raje
- Yashodhra Katju
- Ratikumar Vyas

Supporting cast include:

- Chimanlala
- Nasrin
- Madhumati
- Satish Vyas
- Rasvir
- Pandeji
- Upendra Trivedi
- Arvind Trivedi
- Ajit Soni
- Jaikishan
- Sooryakumari
- Sarita
- Narmadashankar
- Dushyant
- Devendra Pandya
- Vitthal Pandya
- Bhudo Advani
- Vishvnath Pandya
- Meena
- Vijay Kotak (as child actor)
- Nutan (as child actor)
- Nitin shah (as child actor)
- Kamal (as child actor)

== Soundtrack ==
Asha Bhosle, Manna Dey, Vina Mehta, Pinakin Shah, Ratikumar Vyas, Badriprasad are the playback singars.

The soundtrack is as follows:

Jogidas Khuman

Soundtrack album by Avinash Vyas
- Released: 1963
- Genre: Feature film soundtrack
- Language: Gujarati

All lyrics are written by Avinash Vyas; all music is composed by Avinash Vyas

Track listing
No.	Title	Length
1.	"Dhananan Dhananan Goliyu Chhutashe, vir Shurvirona"
2.	"Jo Thai Chhe, Ek Gai, Biji Gai, Jo Thai Chhe"
3.	"Madhrate bole Mor, Jabaki Nindarthi Jagi, Tya Joyo Nandkishor"
4.	"Ker Kanto Vagyo Re, Kanto Jherido"
5.	"Ame Re Rabara, Ho O O..."
6.	"Aatla Utavada Thavu... Hoke, Bhale Nayno Hu Mara Nachavu"
