= Guman =

Guman may refer to:

- Guman, Iran (disambiguation), places in Iran
- Guman Singh Chamling, Nepalese writer
- Guman Singh Damor (born 1957), Indian politician
- Mike Guman (b. 1958), American football player
- Guman Mal Lodha (1926–2009), Indian politician and jurist

== See also ==
- Ghuman (disambiguation)
