= Prithivivallabh (novel) =

1921 Gujarati novel by Kanaiyalal Munshi

- Cover (1966 Edition)
- Author: Kanaiyalal Munshi
- Original title: પૃથિવીવલ્લભ
- Language: Gujarati
- Genre: Historical fiction
- Set in: Medieval India
- Publisher: The Sahityaprakashak Co. Ltd. (1921), Bharatiya Vidya Bhavan (1966)
- Publication date: 1921
- Publication place: India
- Pages: 161 (1966)
- OCLC: 11179581
- Dewey Decimal: 891.473
- LC Class: MLCSA 90/03341

Prithivivallabh (pronounced [pru.tʰi.vi.vəl.ləbʰ]) is a 1921 Gujarati historical novel by Kanaiyalal Munshi. The novel depicts the rivalry between Munj, the Paramara monarch of Dharanagari and Tailap as well as the romance between Munj and Mrinal. The novel draws historical information from various medieval works. It was well received by readers and critics. It was adapted into films and a television series.

== Plot ==
Prithivivallabh is based on the history of Malwa region of India. The novel depicts the rivalry between Munj, the Paramara monarch of Dharanagari and Tailap as well as the romance between Munj and Mrinal. Munj had defeated Tailap several times but Tailap captures Munj with help of his feudatory Yadava king Bhillamraj. In captivity, Munj falls in love with Mrinal, Tailap's widowed sister. Celibate Mrinal too falls in his love but in the end, Tailap gets Munj killed under the feet of an elephant. The love story of Bhoj, a poet; and Vilas, daughter of Bhillamraj engaged with Satyashraya, son of Tailap; runs in parallel.

== Origin ==
Munshi was interested in the medieval history of India and was attracted to Munj's depiction in works of that era. Munshi has mentioned the works of several poets of that time who have praised Munj in their works such as Dhanajaya's Dasarupaka, Dhanika's Avaloka based on Dasarupaka, Dhanpala's son Sarvadeva's Paiya Lachchhi and Rishabhapanchashika in the preface of the book. He has also mentioned Nava-sahasanka-charita by Padmagupta written during the reign of Sindhuraja, the successor of Munja. Munshi was interested in his love of poetry and his military endeavors. He also studied Tailapa's history. Munshi mentioned that all characters he used in the novel are historical like Tailapa's son Akalakacharita or Satyashraya; Bhillam Yadava of Seunadesha, his wife Lakshmi who was the daughter of the Rashtrakuta king Jhanjha of Latur as well as Mrinalvati. Munshi confesses in the preface that he was attracted to Munja as other novelists. He had the idea to write a novella on him for years and finally started its writing when his friend and publisher Haji Mohammed Allarakha insisted. Haji had died before Munshi completed the novella. It was serialised in the journal Vismi Sadi and alluded to contemporary events.

== Reception ==
Prithivivallabh was well received by the readers as well as critics. The book had its second edition in 1924. The book has several editions and has been translated in Hindi. Chandrakant Topiwala lauds depiction of the period, speedy episodes, dramatic presentation, characterization and language. He also lauds lack of complexity in the novel. He adds that even though novel is less historical and more fiction it juxtaposes celibate Mrinal and romantic Munj very well. Prashad Brahmbhatt equates Munj with Friedrich Nietzsche's Übermensch (Superman). The lack of moral values in the novel raised controversy. It was criticised for its "uninhibited presentation of sensuous life bordering to hedonism and irreverent attitude to the then in vogue Hindu ideals of austerity and abstinence". MK Gandhi had criticised it for not conforming to the principles of ahimsa and brahmacharya.

== Adaptations ==
The novel was adapted into a silent film Prithvi Vallabh in 1924 by Manilal Joshi. Prithvi Vallabh is 1943 Hindi film directed by Sohrab Modi based on the script written by Munshi which was adapted from the book. In 1976, a Gujarati film, Malavpati Munj, was released to critical acclaim, staying true to the book, and with an all-star cast including Upendra Trivedi as Munj. Prithvi Vallabh - Itihaas Bhi, Rahasya Bhi is 2018 Indian historical drama broadcast by Sony Entertainment Television, also took inspiration from the book.
