= Ghuman =

Ghuman may refer to:

- Ghumman (surname), people with this surname live both in India and Pakistan
- Ghuman, Gujrat, a village in Pakistani Punjab
- Ghuman, Gurdaspur, a village in Indian Punjab
- Kapur Singh Ghuman, Indian writer and theatre actor
- Varinder Singh Ghuman, Indian bodybuilder and wrestler
- Muhammad Ilyas Ghuman, Pakistani cleric

== See also ==
- Guman (disambiguation)
- Jogidas Khuman (disambiguation)
