= Jogidas Khuman (1975 film) =

- Directed by: Manhar Raskapur
- Written by: Manhar Raskapur (screenplay)
- Produced by: Ramkumar Bohra
- Starring: Arvind Trivedi; Arvind Pandya; Urmila Bhatt; Ramesh Mehta; Padmarani; Manjari Desai
- Music by: Avinash Vyas, Aapa Hameer
- Production companies: Mangalam Chitra, Mumbai
- Release date: 1975
- Running time: 144 Min
- Country: India
- Language: Gujarati

Jogidas Khuman (Gujarati: જોગીદાસ ખુમાણ) is a 1975 Indian Gujarati social drama film directed by Manhar Raskapur.

== Plot ==
The story of the film is based on true events. Jogidas Khuman was the Kathi Darbar of Ambardi (now in Savarkundla). When the Durbar of Bhavnagar, Vajesingh, took back the villages given to his ancestors, he and his father Hada Khuman had rebelled against Bhavnagar State.

== Cast ==
The principal cast is as follows:

- Arvind Trivedi
- Arvind Pandya
- Urmila Bhatt
- Ramesh Mehta
- Padmarani
- Manjari Desai

Supporting cast include:

- Mahesh Joshi
- Aarti
- Rajanibala
- P. Kharsani
- Jayaben Bhatt
- Shashi Dave
- Ramesh Kant
- Suresh Raval
- Ila Trivedi
- Chandrakant Pandya
- Hema
- Dhanu
- Amrut Barot
- Hiren Goswami
- Ganpat Brahmbhatt
- Narhari Jani
- Sharad Vyas
- Rasraj
- Kamlesh Thakar
- Rajkumar
- Veljibhai
- Nilesh (as child actor)
- Sameer (as child actor)
- Sameer Rajda (as child actor)
- Bijal Rajda (as child actor)
- Upendra Trivedi (as guest actor)
- Heena Kausar (as guest actor)

== Soundtrack ==
Mahendra Kapoor, Dilraj Kaur, Suman Kalyanpur, Sulochana Vyas, Veljibhai are the playback singars.

The soundtrack is as follows:

Jogidas Khuman

Soundtrack album by Avinash Vyas
- Released: 1975
- Genre: Feature film soundtrack
- Language: Gujarati

All lyrics are written by Avinash Vyas, Aapa Hameer; all music is composed by Avinash Vyas

Track listing
| No. | Title | Lyrics | Singer(s) | Length |
|---|---|---|---|---|
| 1. | "Jevi Bharu Pyali Tevi Thay Khali" | Avinash Vyas | Dilraj Kaur |
| 2. | "Ram Rakhe Teva Rahiye" | Avinash Vyas |
| 3. | "Radhajina Uncha Mandir, Nicha Mol Jharukhade Diva Bale Re Lol" | Avinash Vyas | Suman Kalyanpur |
| 4. | "Taro Doso Dakho Kare, Mane Tuthi Aagho Kare" | | Mahendra Kapoor, Sulochana Vyas |
| 5. | "Jogi Tara Juddha Jova Aabhe Apsara Thambhati" | Aapa Hameer | Veljibhai |
| 6. | "Chando Ugyo Chokma Ghayal...Dhadaka Bhadaka Top Bandook Na..." |
| 7. | "Dhadaka Bhadaka Top Bandook Na..." |
