= Honey Chhaya =

Indian writer, actor and director

Honey Chhaya (1930 – 28 February 2016) was an Indian writer, actor and director. He directed and acted in both Hindi and Gujarati films and plays.

== Life ==
Honey Chhaya was born in 1930. He started his acting career in 1944. Initially, he acted in street plays spreading the message of the Indian independence movement. Later, he started producing plays for the Indian People's Theatre Association. He had a long career association with Salim Khan, whom he assisted in film writing. He was also a business secretary of Salman Khan and served a critical role in building his career.

He directed several Gujarati films and plays. He brought Chhel Vayeda-Paresh Daru in production design career. He wrote a column on forensic science in Gujarati weekly; Janmabhoomi Pravasi. He acted in several TV commercials. He died on 28 February 2016 5:45 pm at Cardinal Gracias Memorial Hospital, Vasai, Mumbai after a brief illness.

== Personal life ==
He was married to Manisha. They had a son, Bibhas Chhaya and a daughter, Neerja. Bibhas Chhaya was associated with the film production company of Salman Khan.

== Filmography ==
=== Direction ===
Gujarati films

- Anand Mangal
- Dada Ho Dikari

=== Actor ===
Gujarati films

- Mendi Rang Lagyo (1960)
- Kadu Makrani (1960)
- Jeevno Jugari (1963)

Hindi films

- Kahin Aar Kahin Paar (1971)
- Jaago (2004)
- Being Cyrus (2005) as Fardoonjee Sethna
- ’’Munnabhai MBBS
- Firaaq (2008) as Bapuji
- Blue Oranges (2009) as Old Man in jail
- What's Your Raashee? (2009) as Hasmukhbhai Shukla
- Na Ghar Ke Na Ghaat Ke (2010) as an Old man
- Tum Milo Toh Sahi (2010) as Nani Anjuman
- Dabangg (2010) as Old Man - Item Song
- OMG – Oh My God! (2012) as Jagdeesh Bhai
- Monsoon Shootout (2013) as Manager (Paradise Lodge) (final film role)

English films

- The Best Exotic Marigold Hotel (2011) as Young Wasim

TV series

- Baa Bahoo Aur Baby as Narsikaka
- Bombay Blue (TV Mini-Series) as Caretaker in Episode #1.3 (1997)

Writer

- Yeh Majhdhaar (associate writer) (1996)
