= Malavpati Munj =

- Directed by: Ravindra Dave
- Based on: Prithivivallabh
- Produced by: Madhubhai Patel
- Starring: Tanuja; Upendra Trivedi; Shrikant Soni; Arvind Kirad; Nalin Dave; Firoz Irani; Ramesh Mehta; Manjari Desai
- Music by: Avinash Vyas
- Production companies: Sudha Enterprise, Mumbai
- Release date: 1976
- Running time: 160 Minute
- Country: India
- Language: Gujarati

Malavpati Munj (Gujarati: માલવપતિ મુંજ) is a 1976 Indian Gujarati film directed by Ravindra Dave.

== Plot ==
The story of the film is based on Kanaiyalal Munshi's novel "Prithivivallabh" and the historical drama "Malavapati Munj" written by Prabhulal Dayaram Dwivedi. The main plot of the film is the struggle for power between King Munj of Malwa and King Tailap of southern Telangana and the love affair between Munj and Tailap's widowed sister Mrinal.

== Cast ==
The principal cast is as follows:

- Tanuja as Mrinal
- Upendra Trivedi as Munj
- Shrikant Soni
- Arvind Kirad
- Nalin Dave
- Firoz Irani
- Ramesh Mehta
- Manjari Desai

Supporting cast include:

- Mamata
- Minal Mehta
- Mahesh Joshi
- Ramesh Sedani
- Mina Irani
- Bina Patel
- Jayendra Mishra
- Raju Shrimali
- Tryambak Joshi
- Vibhakar Mehta
- Keshav Thanki
- Anjali Kale

== Soundtrack ==
Total 11 songs are in the film out of which two songs have been taken from Prabhulal Dwivedi's play "Malavapati Munj", while the rest of the songs have been composed by Avinash Vyas.

The soundtrack is as follows:

Malavapati Munj

Soundtrack album by Avinash Vyas, Prabhudas Dviwedi
- Released: 1976
- Genre: Feature film soundtrack
- Language: Gujarati

All lyrics are written by Avinash Vyas, Prabhudas Dviwedi; all music is composed by Avinash Vyas

Track listing
No.	Title	Lyrics	Singer(s)	Length
1.	"Lakh Lakh Divda ni Jyot Jhalkavu Ma"	Avinash Vyas	Usha Mangeshkar
2.	"Rangtali (3) Re Rangma Rangtali"	Avinash Vyas	Usha Mangeshkar
3.	"Harsiddh Ma, Pavavadi Ma"	Avinash Vyas	Mahendra Kapoor, Usha Mangeshkar
4.	"Vage Chhe Re Vage Chhe, Vanaravan Morali Vage Chhe"	Avinash Vyas	Mahendra Kapoor, Usha Mangeshkar
5.	"Gavo... Gavo... Gavo Man Muki... Vanma Bole Mor"	Avinash Vyas	Mahendra Kapoor
6.	"Rangilo Fagan No Mahino... Nachi Rahya Chhe Aankhane.."	Avinash Vyas	Asha Bhosle, Manhar
7.	"Hrday Na Shuddh Premine Nigam na Gyan Ochha Chhe..."	Prabhulal Dwivedi	Manna Dey
8.	"Tari Savari Surat Par Vari Vari Jau.. Ho Sundar"	Avinash Vyas	Suman Kalyanpur
9.	"Kone Kahu Mara Urno Ajampo"	Avinash Vyas	Suman Kalyanpur
10.	"Jabaro Ke Chhe Juvani Salagi..."	Avinash Vyas	Mahendra Kapoor, Preeti, Sulochana
11.	"Jene Maran ni Parava Nathi... Ek Sarkha Divas Sukhna"	Prabhulal Dwivedi	Manna Dey
