= Nandanvan =

- Directed by: Ganpatrao Brahmbhatt
- Produced by: Shrikumar V. Gaglani
- Starring: Vijay Dutt; Arvind Pandya
- Music by: Avinash Vyas
- Release date: 15 February 1961
- Running time: 122 minutes
- Country: India
- Language: Gujarati

Nandanvan is a 1961 Gujarati drama film directed by Ganpatrao Brahmbhatt and produced by Shrikumar V. Gaglani. The music was directed and composed by Avinash Vyas and features Vijay Dutt and Arvind Pandya in lead roles. The film was awarded the Certificate of Merit for Best Film Feature (Gujarati Feature Film) under the 9th National Film Awards.
