= Gunvantrai Acharya =

Indian Gujarati language author and journalist (1900-1965)

- Born: Gunvantrai Popatbhai Acharya; September 9, 1900; Jetalsar, Gujarat, India
- Died: November 25, 1965 (aged 65)
- Occupation: novelist
- Children: Ila Arab Mehta, Varsha Adalja

Gunvantrai Popatbhai Acharya (9 September 1900 – 25 November 1965) was a Gujarati language novelist and journalist from India. His experience with seafarers impacted his adventure and novel writings. His works include several historical fiction novels.

== Biography ==
Acharya was born on 9 September 1900 in Jetalsar, Gujarat, India. He completed his school education from Mandvi, Kutch where he came in contact with seafarers. His father Popatbhai was in police department. He joined college but dropped out after a brief period. He joined Saurashtramitra daily in 1927. He was also associated with several news dailies like Saurashtra, Phulchhab, Prajabandhu and Gujarat Samachar. He was the director of Mojmajah, a film weekly. He was awarded Ranjitram Suvarna Chandrak in 1945. He died on 25 November 1965.

His daughters, Ila Arab Mehta and Varsha Adalja, are also authors.

== Works ==
Acharya wrote 169 books including fictional novels, historical novels, short story collections, adventure novels, teen stories, humor and mystery novels. His novels about seafarers and their adventure were widely popular. His Dariyalal (The Beloved Sea, 1934), an adventure novel about seafarers of Gujarat and their settlement in East Africa based on oral history, won him popularity. His Kalpavruksha was focused on caste issues of the time. His Haji Kasam Tari Vijali (1954) was based on the sinking of the SS Vaitarna in 1888 off the coast of Kathiawar. His other novels include Bhagavo Nejo (1937), Sarfarosh (1953), Ratnakar Maharaj (1964). His historical novels include Girnarne Khole (1946), Senapati (1947), Gurjarlaxmi (1952), Shridhar Mehta (1957), Karad Kal Jage Part 1 and 2 (1957), Bhoot Rade Bhenkar (1961). His historical novel series on Vaghela dynasty of Gujarat includes Vishaldev (1960), Arjundev (1961), Idariyo Gadh (1962). His notable social novels are Kori Kitab (1935), Viratno Zabbo (1938), Putrajanma (1940), Ramkahani (1941). Chhelli Salam (1962), Kedi ane Kanta (1962) and Sakkarbaar are spy fictions. Otana Pani (1938), Shri ane Saraswati (1956), Neelrekha (1962), Jobanpagi (1964) are his novella collections.

He wrote plays also. Allabeli (The God is the Protector, 1946), Jogmaya ane Sheelalekh (1949), Akhovan (1957), Maar Raj (1957) are his play collections.

His other works are Hu Bavo ne Mangaldas (1936), Subhashchandra Bose (1946), Munjhavata Prashno (1947), Aapne Fari Na Vichariye ? (1959).

His story "Kadu Makrani" was adapted into 1960 Gujarati film Kadu Makrani while his play Allabeli was adapted into 1955 film Mulu Manek; both directed by Manhar Raskapur.

== See also ==
- List of Gujarati-language writers
