= Jogidas Khuman (1948 film) =

- Directed by: Manhar Raskapur
- Written by: Kavi 'Jaman' (screenplay)
- Produced by: Manhar Raskapur, Madhusudan
- Starring: Arvind Pandya; Dalpat; Vimal; Champshibhai Nagda
- Music by: Ramesh Desai, Indubhai Parekh
- Production companies: Roop Chhaya Chitra, Mumbai
- Release date: 1948
- Running time: 121 min
- Country: India
- Language: Gujarati

Jogidas Khuman (Gujarati: જોગીદાસ ખુમાણ) is a 1948 Indian Gujarati historical drama film directed by Manhar Raskapur.

== Plot ==
The story of the film is based on true events. Jogidas Khuman was the Kathi Darbar of Ambardi (now in Savarkundla). When the Durbar of Bhavnagar, Vajesingh, took back the villages given to his ancestors, he and his father Hada Khuman had rebelled against Bhavnagar State.

== Cast ==
The principal cast is as follows:

- Arvind Pandya
- Master Dalpat
- Vimal
- Champashibhai Nagda
- Ratikumar Vyas

Supporting cast include:

- Chimanlal
- Sanjay
- Narmdashankar
- Balwant Loban
- Rasvir
- Kesari Sinh
- Pinakin Shah
- Kusum Thakkar
- Pramila
- Foolrani
- Kumud
- Gulab Athwale
- Manu
- Manishankar
- Madhubhai
- Thavdi
- Shankar
- Ramlal
- Jetha
- Laxmikant (as child actor)

== Soundtrack ==
The soundtrack is as follows:

Jogidas Khuman

Soundtrack album by Ramesh Desai, Indukumar Parekh
- Released: 1948
- Genre: Feature film soundtrack
- Language: Gujarati

All lyrics are written by Avinash Vyas, Prahlad Parekh, Venibhai Purohit, Kailash Pandya; all music is composed by Ramesh Desai, Indukumar Parekh

Track listing
No.	Title	Lyrics	Singer(s)	Length
1.	"Dhananan Dhananan Goliyu Chhutashe, vir Shurvirona"	Avinash Vyas	Ratikumar
2.	"Hu-lu-lu-lu Hal re Khamma Khamma..."	Avinash Vyas	Amirbai
3.	"Heji ek Bhangati Rate, Tara Tej Jhankhvate"	Prahlad Parekh	Amirbai
4.	"O Bhatvari... Nen Vanche Chhe Namna Tari"	Venibhai Purohit	Indukumar, Gandhari
5.	"Ali Radha? Jara Kholone Dhwar, Hu Re Shyam Murari"	Kailas Pandya	Ramesh Desai, Paamilabai
6.	"Halyo Jay... E Halyo Jay..."	Avinash Vyas	Arvind Pandya
7.	"Gamdu Dhabke Chhe, Ugata re Pahorma"	Avinash Vyas	Indukumar, Gandhari
8.	"Avsar Avyo Chhe Anganiye Aaj"	Avinash Vyas	Indukumar, Gandhari
9.	"Duha & Savaya"	Avinash Vyas	Ratikumar, Amirbai
