= Manvini Bhavai (film) =

- Directed by: Upendra Trivedi
- Based on: Manvini Bhavai by Pannalal Patel
- Produced by: Aashish Trivedi; Upendra Trivedi
- Starring: Upendra Trivedi; Anuradha Patel; Arvind Pandya; Chandrakant Pandya; Kalpana Divan
- Edited by: I. N. Kunu
- Music by: Gaurang Vyas
- Release date: 1993
- Running time: 151 minutes
- Country: India
- Language: Gujarati

Manvini Bhavai is a 1993 Gujarati film directed Upendra Trivedi, starring Upendra Trivedi and Anuradha Patel in lead role. The film was produced by Upendra Trivedi and Aashish Trivedi. Based on an eponymous novel written by Indian writer Pannalal Patel, the film tells a love story of Kalu (Trivedi) and Raju (Patel), with a backdrop of rural setting of north Gujarat.

== Cast ==
- Upendra Trivedi
- Anuradha Patel
- Chandrakant Pandya
- Kalpana Divan

== Plot ==
The film narrates the story of farmer and his struggle to survive during the Indian famine of 1899–1900. With a backdrop of famine, it depicts a love story between Kalu (Trivedi) and Raju (Patel).

== Soundtrack ==
Praful Dave, Meena Patel, Kavita Krishnamurthy, Nimesh Desai, Maniraj Barot, Arti Munshi, Upendra Trivedi, Nisha Upadhyay, Sanjay Oza, Ghanshyam Nayak and Bhikhudan Gadhvi are the playback singars.

The soundtrack is as follows:

Manvini Bhavai

Soundtrack album by Avinash Vyas
- Released: 1993
- Genre: Feature film soundtrack
- Language: Gujarati

All lyrics are written by Kavi Daad, Ramesh Parekh, Upendra Trivedi, Pannalal Patel; all music is composed by Gaurang Vyas

Track listing
No.	Title	Lyrics	Singer(s)	Length
1.	"Jago Jago Hare Tripurari Jatala Jogandar"	Kavi Daad	Bhikhudan, Sanjay, Chorus
2.	"He Rama Kahu Ke Ram De Ane Heera Kahu Ke Lol"	Kavi Daad	Praful Dave, Arti, Nisha, Chorus
3.	"Hendo Lya Hendo, Heera Moti... Satni Pavadie"	Upendra Trivedi, Pannalal Patel	Bhikhudan Gadhvi, Meena Patel, Guarang, Chorus
4.	"Nanand Ne Bhojai Beu Bhela Matha Gunthe Re"	Pannalal Patel	Kavita Krishnamurthy, Meena Patel, Chorus
5.	"Jhinu Jhinu Jhuriye Re, Bala Pana Ni Prityu"	Kavi Daad	Praful Dave, Kavita Krishnamurthy, Chorus
6.	"Kalu Tare Te Kediyu Kyathi Lya, Bar Bapona"	Ramesh Parekh, Upendra Trivedi, Pannalal Patel	Bhikhudan Gadhvi, Upendra Trivedi, Savita, Kashmira, Jyoti, Prabhaben
7.	"Dundalo dukh Bhanjano Ane Saday Bale Vesh"	Upendra Trivedi	Nimesh Desai, Ghanshyam
8.	"Sooraj Ugyo Re, Pithi Chole Mandvade"		Kashmira, Prabha, Jyoti, Savita
9.	"Bharo Mara Bhai Re He Mara Gangajaliya"	Upendra Trivedi	Bhikhudan Gadhvi

== Accolades ==
The film won the National Film Award for Best Feature Film in Gujarati at the 41st National Film Awards. Producers Aashish Trivedi and Upendra Trivedi were awarded the Rajat Kamal and a cash prize of ₹20,000, while director Upendra Trivedi was awarded the Rajat Kamal and a cash prize of ₹20,000. The award was given for depicting the drought-torn lives of villagers through the eyes of the protagonist.

== See also ==
- List of Gujarati films
