= Naulakha Haar =

1953 film

- Poster
- Directed by: Bal Chander Shuckla; Harsukh Jagneshwar Bhatt
- Written by: Pt. Anuj Bhaskerji
- Based on: Folklore of Alha-Udal
- Produced by: Ratnadeep Pictures
- Starring: Meena Kumari; Durga Khote; Nirupa Roy; Jeevan
- Edited by: Thokare Desai
- Music by: Bhola Srestha
- Release date: 1953
- Country: India
- Language: Hindi

Naulakha Haar is a 1953 Bollywood drama film produced by Ratnadeep Pictures and directed by Bal Chander Shuckla & Harsukh Bhatt. Bhola Srestha was the music director of this movie.

== Plot ==
Devla is married in a prominent Rajput family located in Mandavgar. Her sister is also married in this family. Their brother, Mahil Rai Podiyal, is bitter about this and plots with Kiriya Rai, which results in Kiriya's vain attempt to steal a valuable necklace, losing his reputation and his sword. Thus humiliated he returns, plots his vengeance, returns, kills Devla's and her sister's husbands, steals the necklace, sets fire to Mandavgar, takes an elephant and a magical flying horse with him, and hangs the scalps of his victims on the doorway to his palace. Devla swears to avenge this humiliation. Now 19 years later, Devla's son, Udal, has grown up and is told about his past. He decides to kill Kiriya, but finds out that he is Bijma's, the woman he loves, brother. Kiriya finds out about this and forbids Bijma from seeing him again. Nevertheless, Udal sneaks into Bijma's, who is learning magic, room. When Kiriya knocks on the door, Bijma magically transforms Udal into a parrot, but Kiriya wrings its neck and tosses it from the balcony. With Udal's neck wrung, how will Devla carry out her vengeance?

== Cast ==
- Meena Kumari as Bijma
- Durga Khote as Devla
- Nirupa Roy as Lakha
- Jeevan as Mahil
- Ishwarlal as Kiriya
- Arvind Pandya as Udal
- Sunder as Dheva

== Crew ==
- Director – Harsukh Jagneshwar Bhatt and Bal Chander Shuckla
- Producer – Ratnadeep Pictures
- Story – Pt. Anuj Bhaskerji
- Dialogues and Screenplay – Pt. Girish
- Photography – K. Purushottam & Arvind Desai
- Music – Bhola Srestha
- Lyrics – Bharat Vyas and Ramesh Gupta
- Editing – Thakore Desai
- Playback Singers –Shamshad Begum, Kishore Kumar, Asha Bhosle, Rajkumari Dubey, Pramodini Desai, Arvind, Sunder, Gandhari, Madhubala Jhaveri

== Soundtrack ==
Naulakha Haar

Soundtrack album by Bhola Srestha
- Recorded: Unknown
- Genre: Film soundtrack
- Producer: Ratnadeep Pictures

The lyrics for the songs of the film were written by Bharat Vyas and Ramesh Gupta. Bhola Srestha wrote the music.

| Song | Singer |
|---|---|
| "Mohe La De Naulakha Haar" | Kishore Kumar, Shamshad Begum |
| "Aana Chahun Aa Na Saku" | Asha Bhosle |
| "Jaise Gunjta Ho Surila Sur" | Asha Bhosle |
| "Raja Tere Desh Mein" | Promodini Desai, Shamshad Begum |
| "Saanwala Salona" | Gandhari |
| "Jhoolna Jhulaye Maiya" | Rajkumari Dubey |
| "Sunn Sunn O Pyaare Hansa" | Madhubala Jhaveri |
