= Malela Jeev (1956 film) =

- Directed by: Manhar Raskapur
- Based on: Malela Jeev by Pannalal Patel
- Produced by: Champashibhai Nagda; Lalu Shah
- Starring: Dina Gandhi; Mahesh; Champashibhai; Vishnukumar Vyas; Narayan Rajgor
- Music by: Avinash Vyas
- Production company: Sadhana Chitra - Mumbai
- Release date: 1956
- Running time: 141 minutes
- Country: India
- Language: Gujarati

Malela Jeev (Gujarati: મળેલા જીવ) is a 1956 Indian Gujarati romantic-drama film directed by Manhar Raskapur and produced by Champashibhai Nagda and Lalu Shah under the banner of Sadhana Chitra. The film is based on the 1941 novel of the same name by Pannalal Patel, who also wrote the screenplay.The film stars Mahesh Desai and Dina Gandhi in the lead roles, with music composed by Avinash Vyas.

== Plot ==
The film is set in rural Gujarat and follows the tragic love story of Kanji, a young man from the Patel community, and Jivi, a woman from a lower caste. The two meet at a village fair and fall in love with each other. Kanji is unable to marry Jivi due to the strict caste restrictions. In order to keep Jivi around, he convinces her to marry Dhula, a village barber. But this marriage proves to be very unhappy. Dhula constantly starts doubting Kanji and Jivi's past relationship and tortures Jivi physically and mentally. Helpless with the situation, Kanji leaves the village, while on the other hand, fed up with these daily fights and unbearable beatings, Jivi finally attempts suicide, but her husband, Dhula, accidentally dies instead. The shock of her husband's death and her intense longing for Kanji cause Jivi to lose her mental balance. Finally, Kanji's worldly love transforms into a higher spiritual love; and with this same sacred feeling for Jivi, he returns from the city to the village to embrace and shelter her.

== Cast ==
The principal cast is as follows:

- Mahesh Desai as Kanji
- Dina Gandhi as Jivi
- Babu Raje
- Champak Lala
- Champshibhai Nagda

Supporting cast include:

- Vishnukumar Vyas
- Chandrika Thakor
- Chandrakant Sangani
- Kamlesh Thakar
- Pratap Ojha
- Shobha Joshi
- Tarla Mehta
- Leela Jariwala
- Vijay Bhatt
- Narayan Rajgor

== Soundtrack ==
Manna Dey, and Sulochana Chonkar are the playback singars.

The soundtrack is as follows:

Malela Jeev

Soundtrack album by Avinash Vyas
- Released: 1956
- Genre: Feature film soundtrack
- Language: Gujarati

All lyrics are written by Avinash Vyas, Pannalal Patel; all music is composed by Avinash Vyas

Track listing
No.	Title	Lyrics	Singer(s)	Length
1.	"Charar Charar Maru Chakdol Chale"	Avinash Vyas	Manna Dey, Chorus
2.	"Tari Lal Lal Paghadi Ne chhede"	Avinash Vyas	Sulochana Chonkar, Chorus
3.	"Tu Chheto Re'je Chhel Chhabila"	Avinash Vyas	Manna Dey, Sulochana Chonkar
4.	"Kanku Chhanti Lakho Re Kankotari"	Avinash Vyas	Manna Dey, Sulochana Chonkar, Chorus
5.	"Ei Vayro Lavyo Vavad"	Avinash Vyas	Pinakin Shah
6.	"Tu Shane Rove Re Ghela Chandrma"	Pannalal Patel	Manna Dey
7.	"Eni E Aa Rat, Aaj Chandra Ne Aaj Chandani "	Avinash Vyas	Sulochana Chonkar
8.	"Upar Gagan, Niche Dharti"	Avinash Vyas	Manna Dey, Sulochana Chonkar
9.	"Bhulya Re Bhulashe Mahiyar Malakha"	Pannalal Patel	Manna Dey, Sulochana Chonkar
