= Mulu Manek =

- Directed by: Manhar Raskapur
- Written by: Gunvantrai Acharya (story), Manhar Raskapur (script)
- Based on: Allabeli play by Gunvantrai Acharya
- Starring: Shanta Apte; Arvind Pandya
- Cinematography: Manek Mehta
- Music by: Indukumar Parekh
- Production company: Vikram Chitra
- Release date: 1955
- Running time: 137 minutes
- Country: India
- Language: Gujarati

Mulu Manek is a 1955 Gujarati historical fantasy film directed by Manhar Raskapur from India. The film depicted Mulu Manek, a bandit, fighting the British. The lead roles were played by Shanta Apte and Arvind Pandya. The music was composed by Indukumar.

== Plot ==
During the British Raj, Okha in Kathiawar region is captured by the British and is ruled by the Gaekwad dynasty. Before and during the Indian Rebellion of 1857, local Wagher chief Mulu Manek becomes a bandit and opposes the Gaekwad and the British. When Mulu's childhood friend Devobha's marriage proposal is rejected by Mulu's sister Devbai, Devobha joins the opposition as a soldier. Devobha has changed his mind following the sacrifice of his mother. Mulu decides to surrender to save his comrades but he is prevented and encouraged by Devobha to fight. Eventually they all die fighting.

== Cast ==
The cast is as follows:

- Shanta Apte
- Arvind Pandya
- Champshibhai Nagda
- Shalini
- Champak Lala
- Ulhas

== Production ==
The film was based anti-Imperialist play Allabeli by Gujarati author Gunvantrai Acharya. The play was staged by Indian People's Theatre Association (IPTA) first and was adapted into the film. It was directed by Mahnar Raskapur and produced under the banner of film company Vikram Chitra. The film starred Hindi-Marathi singer Shanta Apte which remained her only Gujarati film.

== Music ==
The music was composed by Indukumar Parekh while the lyrics were written by Karsandas Manek.

Track list
No.	Title	Singer(s)	Length
1.	"Mane Eja Samajatu Nathi"	Madhubala Javeri	3:39
2.	"Na Chhadia Hathiyaar"	Madhubala Javeri	3:42

== Legacy ==
The film became the first among the series of similar genre films by Raskapur; all featuring the opposition to the British such as Kadu Makrani (1960). The film was remade in 1977 in Gujarati by Manibhai Vyas.
