= Prahlad Parekh =

Gujarati poet and translator (1911–1962)

- Born: Prahlad Jethalal Parekh; 22 October 1911; Bhavnagar, British India
- Died: 2 January 1962 (aged 50)
- Education: Gujarat Vidyapith, Santiniketan
- Occupations: Poet, translator
- Writing career
- Language: Gujarati
- Notable work: Bari Bahar (1940)

Prahlad Jethalal Parekh (22 October 1911 – 2 January 1962) was a Gujarati poet and translator from India whose works contributed to the rise of a modern poetry in the Gujarati literature.

== Biography ==
Parekh was born on 22 October 1911 in Bhavnagar, Gujarat to Jethalal Parekh. He completed his primary and secondary education at Dakshinamurti, Bhavnagar. He later dropped out of high school in 1930 to join the independence movement against the British and was subsequently jailed. After completing his jail sentence, he rejoined Dakshinamurti and further studied at Gujarat Vidyapith and Santiniketan, where he was influenced by Rabindranath Tagore. In 1937, he became a teacher at a Modern School in Vile Parle and in the following year, he worked for a Gharshala (homeschool) in Bhavnagar. Since 1945, he taught at a high school in Mumbai until his death on 2 January 1962.

== Works ==
Parekh was a poet of the post-Gandhian period. Unlike other poets whose poetry was influenced by Gandhian thoughts, Parekh remained unaffected by this trend and almost exclusively wrote lyrical poetry. Parekh was influenced by Rabindranath Tagore's musical metrics, his mysticism and lyricism as well as the old tradition of Gujarati bhajans. Though a modest collection, his works are considered to have significantly contributed to the rise of the modern poetry in Gujarati literature.

Gulab ane Sivali (1938), a prose tale, and Ruperi Sarovarne Kinare (1962), a translation of Laura Ingalls Wilder's By the Shores of Silver Lake, count among his notable works, as do his two collections of poetry, Bari Bahar (Out from the Window; 1940) and Sarwani (The Spring; 1948). Parekh had also contributed to children's literature. Rajkumarni Shodhma and Karunano Swayamvar are his children's long stories and Tanmaniya is his unpublished collection of children's poetry. He translated one of Stefan Zweig's novels into Gujarati as Ajaninu Antar. Shistni Samasya (1962) is his introductory book on discipline.

== Criticism ==
The publication of Bari Bahar made a great impact and is considered the turning point of the Gujarati poetry. Gujarati writer and critic, Mansukhlal Jhaveri, noted in History of Gujarati literature that there is an undercurrent of sadness in Parekh's poetry.

== See also ==
- List of Gujarati-language writers
