= Guman Singh Chamling =

Nepalese writer

- Occupations: Poet, writer
- Writing career
- Language: Nepali
- Notable awards: Sahitya Akademi Award(1979)

Guman Singh Chamling was a writer and a novelist in the Nepali language. He was from Darjeeling district, India. He received the Sahitya Akademi Award in 1979 for his collection of essays Maulo.
