= Ghuman, Gujrat =

Coordinates: 32°37′49.4″N 74°08′51.1″E

Ghuman گھمن
- Interactive map of Ghuman
- Country: Pakistan
- Province: Punjab
- District: Gujrat

Population
  - Total: 1,500
- Time zone: UTC+5 (PST)
- Calling code: 053

Ghuman (Urdu: گھمن) is a village situated near University of Gujrat in the Gujrat District, Punjab, Pakistan. The main tribe of the Ghuman village is the Ghuman Jatt clan and other smaller clans including Warraich, Maher and Cheema.
