= Vir Mangdavalo =

- Poster
- Directed by: Babubhai Mistry
- Written by: Ramjibhai Vania
- Based on: Folklore of Vir Mangdavalo
- Produced by: Subhash Sagar, Upendra Trivedi
- Starring: Upendra Trivedi; Arvind Trivedi; Snehlata
- Cinematography: K Vaikunth
- Music by: Avinash Vyas
- Production company: Sagar Arts Corporation
- Release date: 1976
- Running time: 161 minutes
- Country: India
- Language: Gujarati
- Box office: ₹400,000,000

Vir Mangdavalo is 1976 Gujarati romantic fantasy film directed by Babubhai Mistry from India. The film depicted a folklore from Gujarat. The lead role was played by Upendra Trivedi, Arvind Trivedi and Snehlata. The music was composed by Avinash Vyas. It was a commercial success. The film was dubbed in Bhojpuri as Amar Suhagin in 1978.

== Plot ==
Mangdavalo was a nephew of Bhan Jethva, royal of Dhatarvad. He chases a bandit Bayal Chadva who has abducted cows from his maternal uncle's town Ghumli. On the way, he meets her lover Padmavati at Patan who invite her to play Chopat. He promises to return for play and chases Bayal. In ensued fight, Mangdavalo dies and becomes a ghost as he died unfulfilling his promise.

Following his death, Padmavati becomes mad and her marriage is arranged with a Vanik. The ghost of Mangdavalo stops the marriage party on the way and requests his uncle Alasivala to arrange his marriage with Padmavati. They marry in a stepwell near a banyan tree which turns in a palace at night and back to banyan tree in day. The couple lives a mix of happy and sad life as their union is only possible at night. At last, Padmavati liberates the ghost of Mangdavalo from his ghostly life at Damodar Kund by drowning with his ashes.

== Cast ==
The cast is as follows:

- Upendra Trivedi as Mangdavalo, played double roles
- Arvind Trivedi
- Snehlata Gadkari as Padmavati
- Champshibhai Nagda
- P. Kharsani

Others include Hercules, Jayant Vyas, Jagat Singh Jagga, Minal Mehta, Madhav Sangani, Mahesh Joshi, Mukund Pandya, Jayant Shah, Saroj Parikh, Jayendra Mishra, Sharmishtha Vaidya, Pushpa Mehta, Rashidabanu, Anjanidevi, Hansa Lakod, Ranglal Nayak, Narhari Jani, Mukund Joshi, Kaustubh Trivedi, Prabhakar Joshi, Amrut Nayak, Nandu Pahelwan, Ganja Pahelwan, Lili Patel, Devyani Thakkar, Rajnibala. The film also starred Hindi cinema actors Achala Sachdev, Tun Tun, Keshto Mukherjee, Shakilabanu Bhopali, Padma Khanna and Amjad Khan who played Bayal Chadva.

== Production ==
The film is based on a folklore of Vir Mangdavalo popular in villages of Saurashtra region of Gujarat. It was the first film produced by Subhash Sagar and presented by Ramanand Sagar. It was shot at Lakshmi Vilas Palace.

== Soundtrack ==
The film included folk music. The soundtrack is as follows:

Vir Mangdavalo

Soundtrack album by Avinash Vyas
- Released: 1976
- Genre: Feature film soundtrack
- Length: 47:54
- Label: EMI (Saregama)
- Producer: Sagar Arts Corporation
External audio
- Album on YouTube

All music is composed by Avinash Vyas.

Track list
| No. | Title | Lyrics | Singer(s) | Length |
|---|---|---|---|---|
| 1. | "Tari Vanki Re Paghaldi" | Avinash Vyas | Asha Bhonsle, chorus | 7:04 |
| 2. | "Aankhiyun Man Gori" | Kavi Daad | Asha Bhonsle, Mahendra Kapoor | 3:27 |
| 3. | "Ruperi Raatma" | Avinash Vyas | Asha Bhonsle, Mahendra Kapoor | 5:07 |
| 4. | "Kahun Chhun Re Kanuda (Raas)" | Avinash Vyas | Asha Bhonsle, Veljibhai Gajjar, chorus | 8:09 |
| 5. | "Suraj Ugta Santani" | Avinash Vyas | Asha Bhonsle, Mahendra Kapoor | 5:49 |
| 6. | "Aashak Mashuk Samasami (Qawwali)" | Avinash Vyas | Anand Kumar C., Asha Bhosle, Mahendra Kapur | 8:46 |
| 7. | "Joshida Mara Josh To Juvone" | Avinash Vyas | Asha Bhonsle | 4:38 |
| 8. | "Tari Vanki Re Paghaldi" | Avinash Vyas | Jayesh Nayak, Seema Trivedi | 4:54 |
| Total length: | | | | 47:54 |

== Reception ==
The film was a commercial success. The song "Tari Vanki Re Paghaldi" became a hit. It grossed over ₹40 lakh (equivalent to ₹12 crore or US$1.3 million in 2023).

The 2019 Gujarati film Vir Mangdavalo was produced with similar subject.

== See also ==
- Bhanvad - a town where a banyan tree associated with Mangdavalo is located
