= Mendi Rang Lagyo =

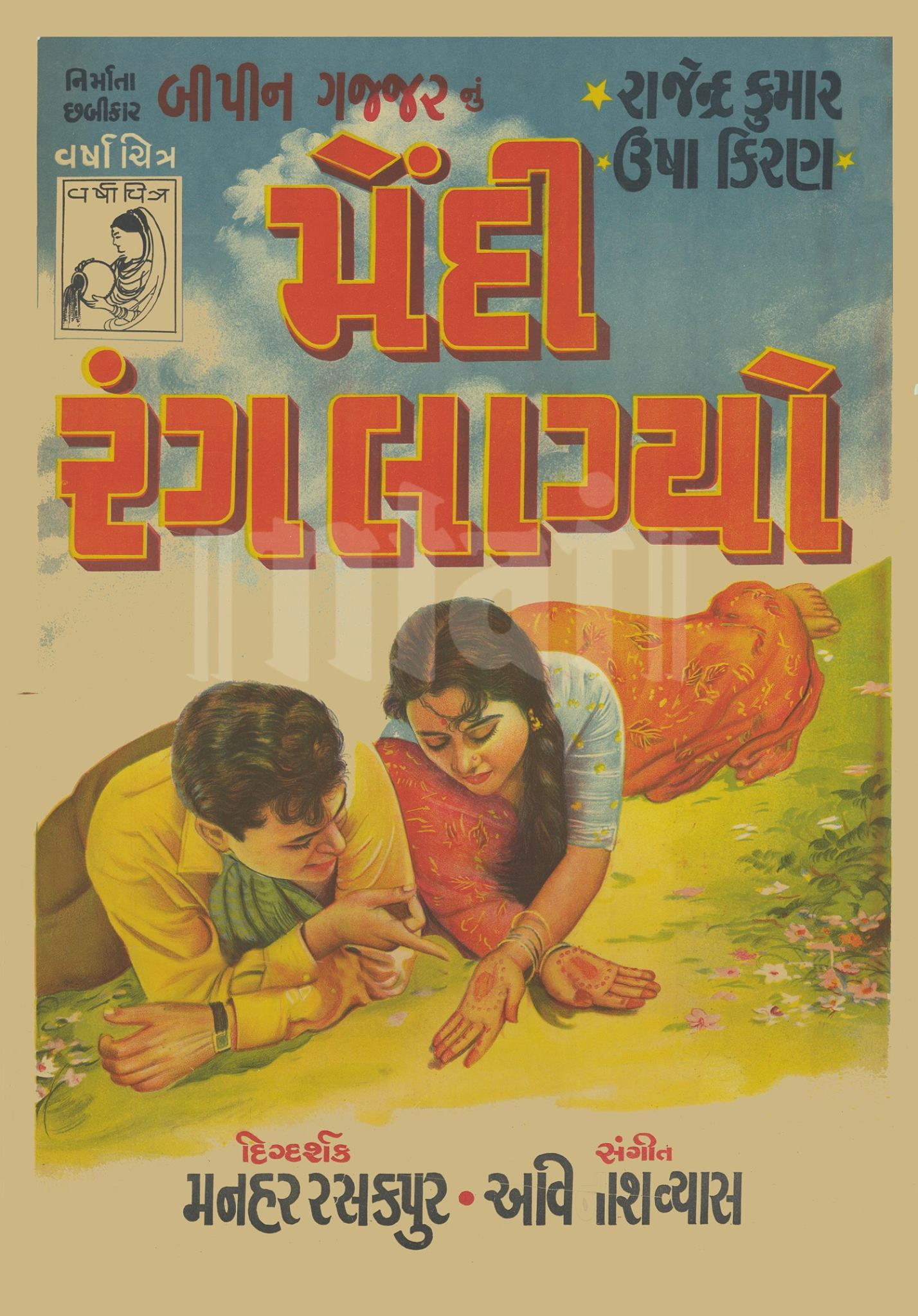
- Official poster
- Directed by: Manhar Raskapur
- Written by: Chaturbhuj Doshi
- Produced by: Bipin Gajjar
- Cinematography: Bipin Gajjar
- Music by: Avinash Vyas
- Release date: 1960
- Running time: 151 minutes
- Country: India
- Language: Gujarati

Mendi Rang Lagyo is a 1960 Indian Gujarati-language romantic film directed by Manhar Raskapur starring Rajendra Kumar and Usha Kiran. It is particularly remembered for its soundtrack by Gujarati music composer Avinash Vyas featuring songs sung by Lata Mangeshkar, Manna Dey and Mahendra Kapoor. The film was produced by Bipin Gajjar and written by Chaturbhuj Doshi.

== Cast ==
The principal cast is as follows:

- Rajendra Kumar
- Usha Kiran
- Upendra Trivedi
- Chandravadan Bhatt
- Satish Vyas
- Keshav
- Toral Divetia
- Kiran Lal
- Chandrakant Sangani
- Honey Chhaya
- Jayesh Desai
- B. M. Vyas
- Bhimjibhai
- Narayan Ragjor
- Jaya Bhatt
- Niharika Divetia
- Madan Saigal
- Mamta Bhatt
- Nitin Shah
- Upendra Trivedi

== Soundtrack ==
The film's music was composed by Avinash Vyas, and features songs sung by famous Bollywood singers like Lata Mangeshkar, Manna Dey, Mohammed Rafi and Mahendra Kapoor. The Garba song "Mehndi Te Vavi Malve" is still very popular and is played during celebrations especially weddings and Navratri. Other songs of film too became very popular.

Track list
No.	Title	Lyrics	Artist(s)	Length
1.	"Aa Mumbai Chhe"	Avinash Vyas	Manna Dey	3:31
2.	"Raste Rajalti Varta"	Avinash Vyas	Lata Mangeshkar	3:26
3.	"Dard Ekaje Chhe"	Avinash Vyas	Manna Dey	3:19
4.	"Ghunghate Dhankiyo Ek Kodiyu"	Chatrabhuj Doshi	Lata Mangeshkar	3:21
5.	"Mehndi Te Vavi Malve - Garbo"	Traditional (Folk)	Lata Mangeshkar, Pinakin Shah, Chorus	6:22
6.	"Mehndi Te Vavi Malve - Garbo"	Traditional	Lata Mangeshkar, Manna Dey	3:00
7.	"Mehndi Rang Lagyo"	Traditional	Lata Mangeshkar, Chorus	3:55
8.	"Nayan Chakchoor Chhe"	Avinash Vyas	Lata Mangeshkar, Mohammed Rafi	3:28
9.	"Pandadu Lilu Ne Rang Rato"	Avinash Vyas	Lata Mangeshkar, Mahendra Kapoor	3:18
10.	"Pandadu Lilu Ne Rang Rato"	Avinash Vyas	Jayesh Nayak, Seema Trivedi	4:10
