= Jesal Toral =

- Poster
- Directed by: Ravindra Dave
- Written by: Jitubhai Mehta; Himmat Dave (script); Ramesh Mehta
- Based on: Folklore of Jesal Toral
- Produced by: Kanti R. Dave; T. J. Patel
- Starring: Anupama; Upendra Trivedi; Arvind Trivedi; Ramesh Mehta
- Cinematography: Pratap Dave
- Music by: Avinash Vyas (lyrics and composition)
- Production company: Kirti Films
- Release date: 1971
- Running time: 137 minutes
- Country: India
- Language: Gujarati

Jesal Toral is a 1971 Indian Gujarati devotional film written and directed by Ravindra Dave. It proved to be one of the biggest hits of Gujarati cinema and ran for 25 weeks in theatres.

== Cast ==
The cast is as follows:

- Anupama as Toral
- Upendra Trivedi as Jesal
- Arvind Trivedi
- Ramesh Mehta
- Jayant Bhatt
- Mulraj Rajda
- Mukund Pandya
- Laxmi Patel
- Sarala Dand
- Induben Rajda
- Lily Patel
- Vandana
- Suryakant Mandhare
- Umakant
- Veljibhai Gajjar
- Jayshree T. (guest appearance)

== Production ==
Ravindra Dave had planned to remake his Hindi blockbuster film Nagina (1951) with Leena Chandavarkar and Sanjay Khan, but the project was delayed. As a result, he turned his production crew to Gujarati cinema to keep them employed.

The film is based on local folk legend of bandit Jesal Jadeja who was preached and reformed by Kathi saint-woman Toral. Their memorial shrines are located in Anjar in Kutch district, Gujarat. It was the first Eastmancolor Gujarati film and was a debut film of Upendra Trivedi and Ramesh Mehta. It was shot in Orvo technicolor. As the Laxmi Studio at Baroda was not yet commissioned, the film was partly shot in Kutch and partly in Mumbai.

== Soundtrack ==
Jesal Toral

Soundtrack album by Avinash Vyas
- Released: 23 January 1971
- Genre: Feature film soundtrack
- Length: 23:56
- Language: Gujarati
- Label: Saregama

All lyrics are written by Avinash Vyas; all music is composed by Avinash Vyas.

Track listing
No.	Title	Singer(s)	Length
1.	"Dhuni Re Dhakhavi"	Mahendra Kapoor	2:50
2.	"Ori Ori Aav Gori"	Asha Bhosle	3:11
3.	"Jesal Karile Vichar"	Suman Kalyanpur	3:20
4.	"Paap Tarun"	Diwaliben Bhil, Ismail Valera	1:42
5.	"Roi Roi Kone Sambhalavu"	Ismail Valera	4:31
6.	"Bujhai Ja"	Mahendra Kapoor,	1:43
7.	"Thobhi Ja Thobhi Ja"	Suman Kalyanpur	3:22
8.	"Mara Payal Ni Chhuti Dor"	Krishna Kalle	3:17
Total length:			23:56

The song "Dhuni Re Dhakhavi" became very popular.

== Release and reception ==
The film was released in 1971. The film was exempted from the tax by the Government of Gujarat to encourage production of the Gujarati films.

The film proved to be one of the biggest hits of Gujarati cinema and ran for 25 weeks in theatres. It won 17 awards from the Government of Gujarat. The film is considered to have revived the Gujarati cinema. Dave went on to direct more than 25 Gujarati films and never returned to Hindi cinema.
