= Ranakdevi (1973 film) =

- Poster
- Directed by: Babubhai Mistry
- Written by: Ramjibhai Vania (story, dialogue), Jitubhai Mehta (script)
- Based on: Ranakadevi
- Produced by: Champshibhai Nagda
- Starring: Tarla Mehta; Upendra Trivedi; Arvind Pandya; Arvind Trivedi
- Cinematography: Vishnukumar Joshi
- Edited by: Thakore Desai
- Music by: Avinash Vyas
- Production company: Chitrakala Mandir
- Distributed by: Chitrabharati
- Release date: 1973
- Running time: 138 minutes
- Country: India
- Language: Gujarati

Ranakdevi is a 1973 Indian Gujarati historical drama film directed by Babubhai Mistry starring Tarla Mehta, Upendra Trivedi, Arvind Pandya and Arvind Trivedi in lead roles. The film was based on the legend of Ranakadevi.

== Plot ==
Siddhraj Jaysinh is a Solanki ruler of Patan. He was a childless and decided to conduct a worship of Shiva with his queens. Ranak is a daughter of Parmara of the Sindh and an adopted daughter of Hadmat Kumbhar of Majevadi village near Junagadh. Shrikanth Barot, his bard, arranges a mock marriage of Ranak with a sword of Jaysinh as he predict she will be a mother of his child. Before the mock marriage, Junagadh king Khengar abducts Ranak to avenge his father Navghan. Jaysinh attacks Junagadh and won the battle with aid of Deshal and Vishal, nephews of Khengar. He returns to Patan with Ranak but on their way, at Wadhwan on the banks of river Bhogavo, she commits sati by burning herself on the funeral pyre.

== Cast ==
The following actors were starred in the film:

- Tarla Mehta
- Upendra Trivedi
- Arvind Pandya
- Arvind Trivedi
- Dina Pathak
- Jayshree T.
- Jayshree Parikh
- Jayant Vyas
- Samir Yagnik (child actor)

== Production ==
The film is based on local folk legend of Ranakadevi, a 12th century queen of Khengara, the Chudasama ruler of Saurashtra region of western India. In film, the historical events were mixed with folk legends. The film was directed by Babubhai Mistry. It was shot at Ambika Temple, Girnar and Girnar Jain temples.

== Soundtrack ==
Ranakdevi

Soundtrack album by Avinash Vyas
- Released: 1973
- Genre: Feature film soundtrack
- Language: Gujarati

The songs were sung by Asha Bhosle, Mahendra Kapoor, Suman Kalyanpur, Vani Jairam, Sulochana Vyas, Veljibhai Gajjar.

All lyrics are written by Avinash Vyas; all music is composed by Avinash Vyas

Track listing
No.	Title	Length
1.	"Hey Girivar Girnar, Tara Shikhar Ni Toch Kade"
2.	"Panghat Pani Gaya'ta, Koini Najaru Lagi Amne, Maru Bedlu Khalikham"
3.	"Oodhu To Chundadi Taru Oodhu, Range Ramo Koini Chundadi Kaari (Holi Geet)"
4.	"Aaso Maso Sharad Poonam Ni Raat Jo, Chandaliyo Ugyo Re Sakhi Mara Chowkma"
5.	"Gagan Ghor Thayu, Jone Aada Aave Vaadala"
6.	"Bhajan Ma Bhang Padyo Re Mara Bhai, Achanak Jovai Gai Ek Bai"
7.	"Jai Jai Jai Jagdishwar, Om Har Har Mahadev"

== Release and reception ==
The film was released in 1973. It was well received by the audience.
