= Upendra Trivedi =

Indian film and stage actor, director and politician (1936–2015)

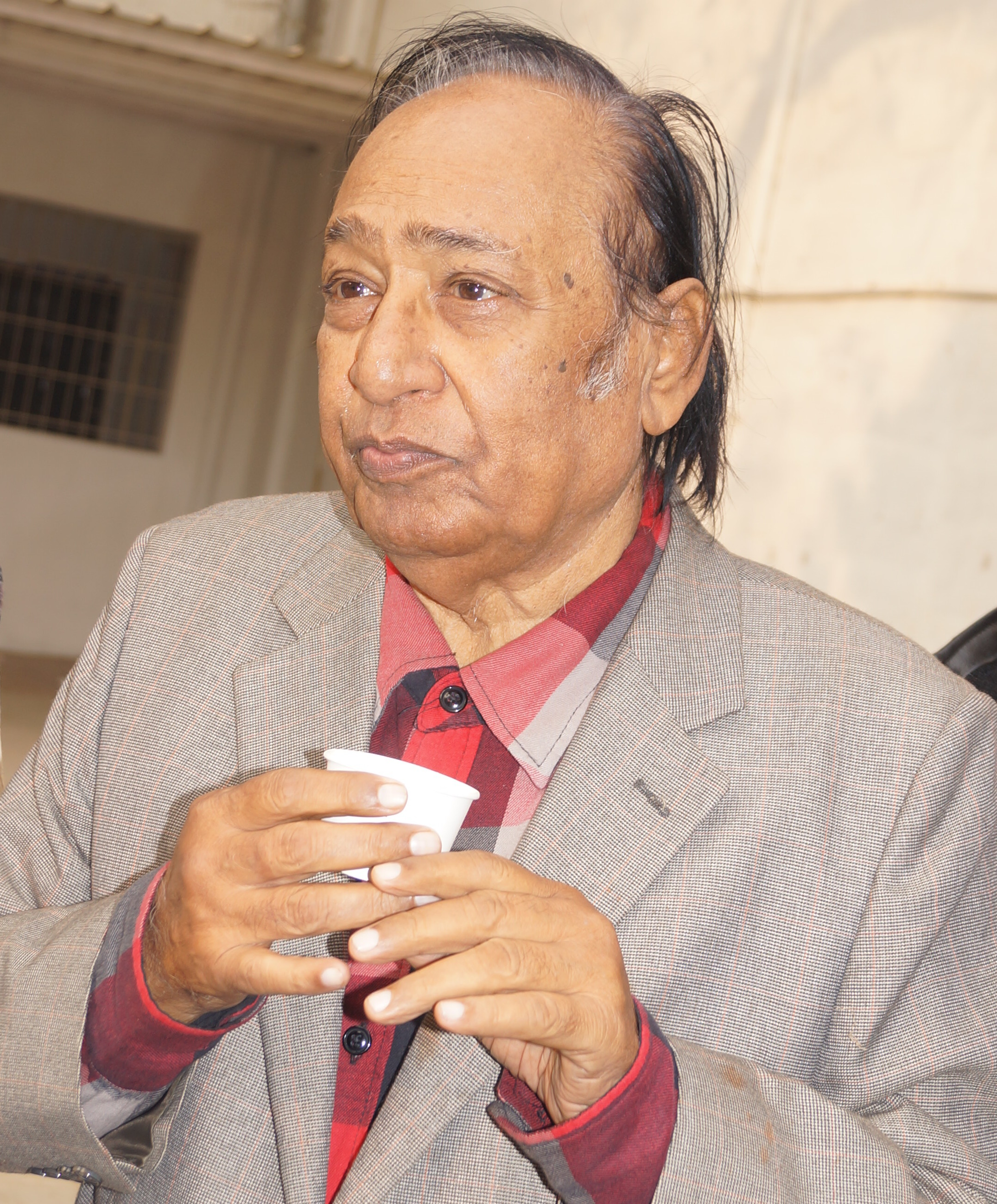
- Trivedi at Anand in 2013
- Born: Upendra Jethalal Trivedi; 14 July 1936; Idar, Gujarat, India
- Died: 4 January 2015 (aged 78); Mumbai, Maharashtra, India
- Occupations: Actor, politician
- Relatives: Arvind Trivedi (brother)

Upendra Jethalal Trivedi (14 July 1936 – 4 January 2015) was an Indian film and stage actor, director and producer who was one of the most prolific actors of Gujarati cinema. As an actor films like Mehndi Rang Lagyo (1960), Jogidas Khuman (1962) were few of his earliest appearances in Gujarati films. He was also known as Abhinay Samrat. He was politically active and was elected to the state legislative assembly three times.

== Early life ==
Upendra Trivedi was born on 14 July 1936 in Indore, Madhya Pradesh, India. His family hailed from Kukadia village near Idar, Gujarat. His parents moved to Ujjain where he completed his education. He lived with his elder brother in Mumbai in early life. He worked as a coolie and a labourer in umbrella manufacturing factory when his father who was a mill worker suffered paralysis.

Trivedi was one of the four siblings – three brothers and a sister. He did his graduation from the Bombay University in Arts faculty. His younger brother, Arvind Trivedi, is also well-known actor who played Ravana in the Hindi epic TV serial, Ramayana. Trivedi's elder brother, Bhalchandra, was an educationist.

== Career ==
Considered one of the most well-known actors of the Gujarati film industry, Trivedi had acted in both Gujarati theatre and films.

=== Acting career ===
from left, Upendra Trivedi as Champaklal, Arvind Trivedi as Deepchand and Minal Karve as Bhabhu in 'Vevishal' play, adopted by Trivedi himself from Jhaverchand Meghani's novel by same name

Upendra Trivedi acted in several drama during his college life in Mumbai. He started his career in industry in the 1970s and had career spanning more than 40 years. He initially played supporting roles in several Gujarati films to earn money and pay college fees. He acted in films like Vanraj Chavdo and Mehndi Rang Lagyo.

His first major break in Gujarati films was Jesal Toral (1971) directed by Ravindra Dave. Ravindra Dave chose him to play lead role following his performance in Gujarati film Abhinay Samrat. Jesal Toral was commercially successful film in which he played role of Jadeja.

He also directed several Gujarati films. His Manvini Bhavai (1993), based on the novel of the same name by Gujarati author, Pannalal Patel. The movie earned the national award. The story of movie was based on the famine of Vikram Samvat 1956 (1900 AD) where the condition of people was dire and many died due to starvation. He also directed and produced Jher To Peedhan Jani Jani based on the novel of same name by Manubhai Pancholi.

He paired with Naresh Kanodia for the first time in film Maa Baap ne Bhulsho Nahi in 1999. He paired with Snehlata in several Gujarati films.

He played seven different roles in Gujarati play, Abhinay Samrat.

His brother Arvind Trivedi is also an actor who acted in Gujarati and Hindi films as well as television shows. He also acted in Hindi film Jungle Mein Mangal, Pavitra Papi, Parde ke Pichhe, Nagina along with his brother Arvind Trivedi in a negative role.

=== Political career ===
Upendra Trivedi joined politics in 1980s and contested and won the Gujarat Legislative Assembly elections in 1985 and 1990 as a candidate of the Indian National Congress; and in 1998 as the independent candidate; representing Bhiloda constituency. He served as the deputy speaker of the assembly from 31 March 2000 to 19 July 2002.

He wrote an autobiography, Upendra Trivedi : Atmakathan ane Anya Aalekh.

== Death ==
Trivedi died on 4 January 2015 at Mumbai following respiratory arrest. He was married and had two sons.

== Recognition ==
He received the Padma Shri in 1989 and the Pandit Omkarnath Thakur award also. In 2012, he received the Kavi Kag Award.

== Filmography ==
=== As actor ===
Films he acted include:

- Kadu Makrani (1960)
- Mendi Rang Lagyo (1960)
- Hiro Salaat (1961)
- Veer Ramwalo (1961)
- Jogidas Khuman (1962)
- Vanraj Chavdo (1963)
- Jesal Toral (1971)
- Parde Ke Peeche (1971, Hindi)
- Jher To Pidhan Jaani Jaani (1972)
- Jungle Main Mangal (1972, Hindi)
- Kadu Makrani (1973)
- Raja Bharathari (1973)
- Ranakdevi (1973)
- Mahasati Savitri (1973)
- Blackmail (1973)
- Ghunghat (1974)
- Harishchandra Taramati (1974)
- Hothal Padmani (1974)
- Jogidas Khuman (1975)
- Jai Ranchhod (1975)
- Bhadar Tara Vehta Pani (1975)
- Shetalne Kanthe (1975)
- Chundadino Rang (1976)
- Malavpati Munj as Munj (1976)
- Ra'Navghan (1976)
- Santu Rangili (1976)
- Vir Mangdavalo (1976)
- Bhrashtachar Murdabad (1977)
- Halaman Jethvo (1977)
- Manno Manigar (1977)
- Paiso Bole Chhe (1977)
- Sadavant Savlinga (1977)
- Sonkansari (1977)
- Kali Rat (1977)
- Khel Khiladi Ka (1977, Hindi)
- Chundadi Odhi Tara Naam Ni (1978)
- Dada Khetrapal (1978)
- Manek Thumbh (1978)
- Patri Parmar (1978)
- Ver Ni Vasulat (1978)
- Amarsinh Rathod (1979)
- Garvo Garasiyo (1979)
- Kunwari Satino Kesari Kanth (1979)
- Lalwadi Phoolwadi (1979)
- Navrang Chundadi (1979)
- Preet Khandani Dhar (1979)
- Rang Rasiya (1979)
- Sona Indhoni Rupa Bedlun (1979)
- Suraj Chandrani Sakhe (1979)
- Vahue Vagovya Mota Khorda (1979)
- Veer Pasali (1979)
- Chitadano Chor (1980)
- Jivi Rabaran (1980)
- Kesar Kathiyani (1980)
- Koino Ladakvayo (1980)
- Namni Nagarvel (1980)
- Sorathni Padmini (1980)
- Amar Devidas (1981)
- Bhav Bhavna Bheru (1981)
- Mehulo Luhar (1981)
- Sheth Jagadusha (1981)
- Vansali Vagi Valamni (1981)
- Retina Ratan (1982)
- Vachhada Dadani Dikri (1983)
- Dharatina Ami (1984)
- Mali Methan (1984)
- Manasaina Diva (1984)
- Machchhu Tara Vaheta Pani (1984)
- Nagmati Nagvalo (1984)
- Sajan Sonalde (1984)
- Malo Naagde (1985)
- Sole Somwar (1988)
- Bhadarne Kanthe (1991)
- Manvini Bhavai (1993)
- Maa Baap ne Bhulsho Nahi (1999)

=== As director ===
- Manvini Bhavai (1993, based on the novel of the same name)
- Jher To Peedha Chhe Jani Jani (1972)
