= Have Mare Hira Nathi Ghasva =

- Directed by: Atul Patel
- Written by: Harshad Gadhvi
- Story by: Harshad Gadhvi
- Produced by: Atul Patel
- Starring: Himanshu Turi, Kajal Raghwani
- Cinematography: Girish Gadhvi
- Edited by: Dharmesh Chanchadiya
- Music by: Manoj-Vimal
- Production company: Modern Moviee Pvt. Ltd.
- Release date: 17 April 2009
- Country: India
- Language: Gujarati
- Box office: est. ₹1.25crore

Have Mare Hira Nathi Ghasva (I Don't Want To Polish Diamonds Anymore) is a 2009 Gujarati film directed by Atul Patel and produced by Atul Patel, starring Himanshu Turi in lead role. The lives of thousands of penurious diamond polishers and the indisposed diamond industry of Gujarat has been the core subject of the film along with the portrayal of socio-economic decay in the state. With the intention of paying off the debt, Karshan- the newly married protagonist (played by Himanshu Turi), with wife Radha, migrates to Surat from his village in Bhavnagar to work in the diamond polishing industry. He settles down after started working in a diamond polishing industry and until the recession, no adversities cross his road. The survival of the protagonist from the slowdown. is the major depiction of the film.

== Plot ==
After being married to his long-term girlfriend Radha, Karsan, who hails from Saurashtra, is loaded with heavy debt. His need for the extra penny to recover the debt made him located in the country's diamond hub- Surat. But the first wave of the recession affected the diamond industry and so did Karsan. It resulted in making the city dull and deserted along with leaving Kisan and several like him jobless that lead them to return to their villages. The film delivers a message that the jobless diamond workers should return to their home instead of committing suicide.

== Cast ==
- Himanshu Turi
- Kajal Raghwani
- Firoz Dhandhukiya as Jr.Amitabh Bachchan
- Raju Bharwad as Jr.Gabbar Singh
- Ashvin Joshi as Jr.Nana Patekar
- Manoj Rathore as Jr.Govinda
- Suresh Rathore as Jr.Sachin

== Production and release ==
Patel said that his films showed the struggle and success, joys and sorrows, ups and downs in the life of a diamond worker. He drew his inspiration for the film from the lakhs of workers who had come from Saurashtra and other places and settled in Surat. The story of the film is written by Harshad Gadhvi.

Produced on a budget of ₹20 lakh (US$21,000), film's production was completed in three months. The film was released on 17 April 2009 in Surat, and was later released in other cities of Gujarat including Ahmedabad, Gandhinagar, and Visnagar. It ran for more than 50 days in theatres. In July 2009, the film was released in New Jersey and Chicago (U.S.), Leicestershire (U.K), and Antwerp (Belgium). Line producer is Ashvin Borad.

=== Casting ===
Atul Patel gave Kajal Raghwani the first chance Kajal started her career in the film industry with the Gujarati film "Have Mare Hira Nathi Ghaswa"produced and directed by Atul Patel.
