= Jeevno Jugari =

- Poster
- Directed by: Dinesh Raval
- Written by: Jitubhai Mehata (screenplay)
- Produced by: Kumar J. Dave
- Starring: Arvind Pandya; Ratna; Devika Roy; Krishnakant
- Cinematography: Pratap Dave
- Music by: Ninu Majumadar
- Production companies: Chandan Chitra, Mumbai
- Release date: 1963
- Running time: 146 minute
- Country: India
- Language: Gujarati

Jeevno Jugari (Gujarati: જીવનો જુગારી) is a 1963 Indian Gujarati social drama film directed by Dinesh Raval.

== Plot ==
'Life is a gamble' is the central theme of the story. The story of the film is intertwined between a gambler Jivan and Shantidas, who is a teacher in Sankali village. According to his nature and profession, Shantidas tries to turn the people of the village on the right path. Shantilal stumbles in the eye of the Jivan. As circumstances change, Shantilal gets entangled in poverty and debt and to get out of this vicious cycle, he resorts to gambling. At the end of the story, Jivan has a change of heart, and he quits gambling.

== Cast ==
The principal cast is as follows:

- Arvind Pandya
- Ratna
- Devika Roy
- Krishnakant
- Harendra Dave
- Honey Chhaya
- Hira Savant
- Raja Nene
- Neena

Supporting cast include:

- Champaklala
- Hasmukh Mehata
- Sarita
- Ajit Soni
- Bagla
- Jagdish Pandya
- Mahesh Joshi
- Sooryakant
- Kamla
- Madhu Pathak

== Soundtrack ==
"Kare Chinta Mari Bhagwan, Mane Dai Didhu Chhe Vardan" is the title song of the film sung by Mahendra Kapoor. "Manav Chalyo Jay; Lekh Lalate Je Lakhya, Mithya Kadi Nav Thay" is a song reflecting the central emotion of the film sung by Kavi Pradeep.

The soundtrack is as follows:

Jivano Jugari

Soundtrack album by Ninu Majumadar
- Released: 1963
- Genre: Feature film soundtrack
- Language: Gujarati

All lyrics are written by Ninu Majumadar; all music is composed by Ninu Majumadar

Track listing
No.	Title	Singer(s)	Length
1.	"Kare Chinta Mari Bhagwan, Mane Dai Didhu Chhe Vardan"	Mahendra Kapoor
2.	"Melo Jagyo, Rangila Raja Rangno Re..."	Kaumudini Munshi
3.	"Manav Chalyo Jay; Lekh Lalate Je Lakhya, Mithya Kadi Nav Thay"	Kavi Pradeep
4.	"Vahele Te Parodhe Dada Uthiya"	Suman Kalyanpur
5.	"Hye Re Ma! Mare Kalajade Jheri Dankh Lagyo"	Suman Kalyanpur
6.	"Shesh, Mahesh, Ganesh, Dinesh... Bholi Bharvadan Bole Re"	Suman Kalyanpur, Rati Kumar
