= Kadu Makrani (film) =

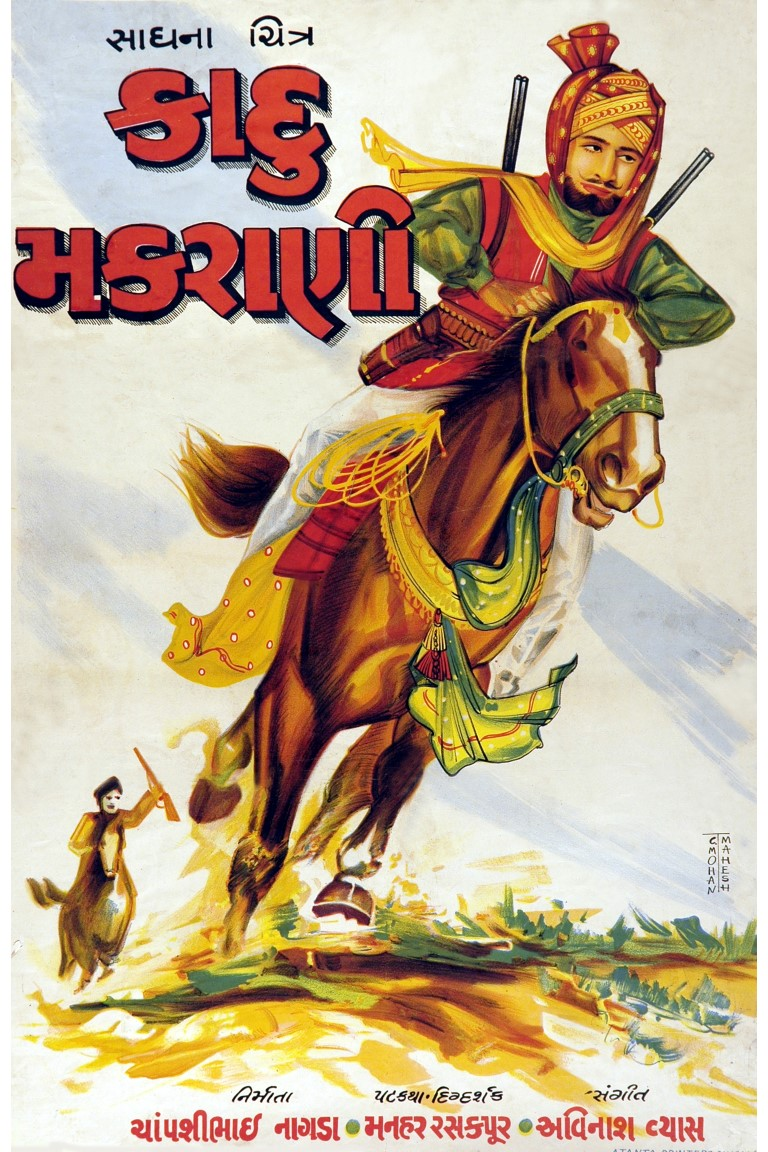
- Poster
- Directed by: Manhar Raskapur
- Written by: Gunvantrai Acharya (story), Manhar Raskapur (script)
- Produced by: Champshibhai Nagada
- Starring: Arvind Pandya
- Cinematography: Bipin Gajjar
- Music by: Avinash Vyas
- Production company: Sadhna Chitra
- Release date: 1960
- Running time: 148 minutes
- Country: India
- Language: Gujarati

Kadu Makrani is a 1960 Gujarati historical fantasy film directed by Manhar Raskapur from India. The film tells the story of the historical figure Kadu Makrani, a bandit, fighting the British. The lead role was played by Arvind Pandya. The music was composed by Avinash Vyas. It was a commercial success.

== Plot ==
A century ago, Makrani clan of Inaj, a settlement in Junagadh State, defy the British Raj. The British invades the settlement thus four Makrani members become bandits and harass the British. The British orders Harbhai Desai who was an administrator under the Nawab of Junagadh, to capture or kill their leader Kadar Baksh, also known as Kadu Madrani. Harbhai Desai and Kadu Makrani were childhood friends who clash on the battlefield with each other. Kadu retracted but was identified and finally captured. In June 1887, he was hanged at Karachi jail.

== Cast ==
The cast is as follows:

- Arvind Pandya
- Shalini
- Champshibhai Nagada
- Mahesh Desai
- Bhudo Advani
- Babu Raje

Other cast members included Champak Lala, Radha, Ruby Myers (Sulochana), Ulhas, Jaya Bhatt, Honey Chhaya, Vishnu Vyas, Padmakumar Joshi, Ajit Soni, Mukund Desai, Devika Roy, Bhimjibhai, Upendra Trivedi, Gunvant Kayastha, Bagla, Manjula Moti.

== Production ==
The film was an anti-Imperialist historical fantasy. The film was based on a biographical story of Kadu Makrani by Gujarati author Gunvantrai Acharya. It was directed by Mahnar Raskapur and produced by Champshibhai Nagada under banner of film company Sadhna Chitra. The production was launched on 18 September 1958, Ganesh Chaturthi.

== Soundtrack ==
The soundtrack is as follows:

Kadu Makrani

Soundtrack album by Avinash Vyas
- Released: 1960
- Genre: Feature film soundtrack
- Length: 16:12
- Label: Saregama
- Producer: Sadhna Chitra

All lyrics are written by Avinash Vyas, Apa Hamir; all music is composed by Avinash Vyas

Track list
| No. | Title | Singer(s) | Length |
|---|---|---|---|
| 1. | "Mari Gagrdi Maan" | Sulochana Vyas, chorus | 3:30 |
| 2. | "Amari Najar Jyan Tamara Bhani Thai" | Geeta Dutt | 3:17 |
| 3. | "Dungare Dungare Kadu Tara Dayara" | Ratikumar Vyas | 3:04 |
| 4. | "Lal Rangna Laheriya" | Geeta Dutt, Mukesh | 3:06 |
| 5. | "Makrani Jo Marad Lade" | Ratikumar Vyas | 3:15 |
| Total length: | | | 16:12 |

== Reception ==
The film was a commercial success. It is Raskapur's best-known film. Film critic Amrit Gangar has considered the film as one of the "landmark" films of Raskapur.

== Legacy ==
The film started a tradition of films depicting the struggle with the establishment in Gujarati cinema. Large number of such films were produced subsequently and the tradition was also mirrored in the Hindi cinema after a decade and half. The film's success pushed for more films based on folklore in Gujarati cinema.

The film was remade in 1973 in Gujarati by Manu Desai.
