= Central Jail Karachi =

Jail in Pakistan

Coordinates: 24.8600°N 67.0100°E

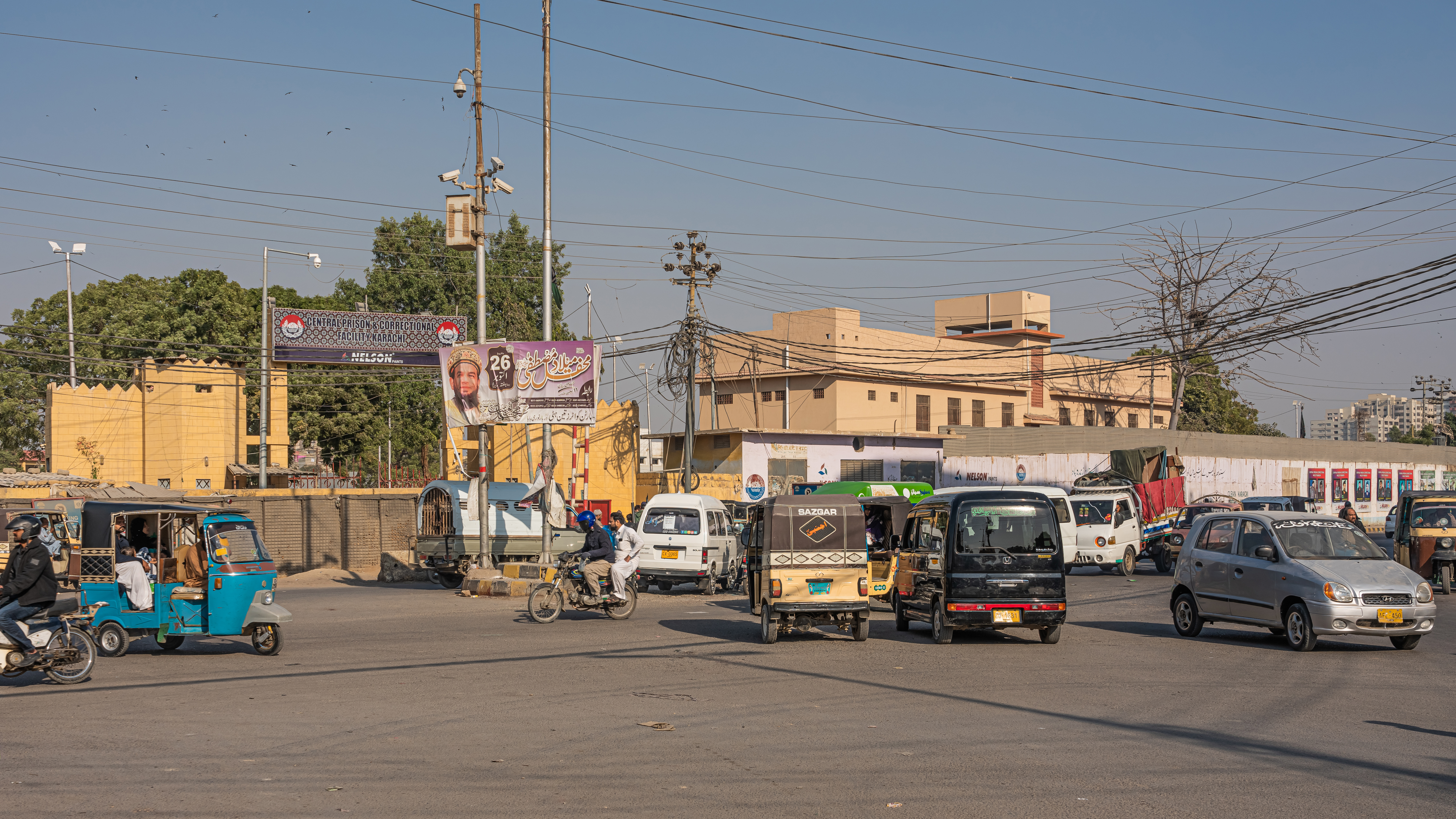
- An outer view of Central Jail Karachi, Pakistan
- Interactive map of Central Jail Karachi
- Location: Karachi, Pakistan
- Status: Operational
- Security class: Maximum
- Population: 4800
- Opened: 1899
- Managed by: Government of Sindh,

Central Jail Karachi, also known as Central Prison Karachi, is a prison in the city of Karachi in Sindh, Pakistan. It houses more than 4800 prisoners including convicted terrorists that include militants who attempted to assassinate President of Pakistan Pervez Musharraf.

== History ==
Central Jail Karachi was established in the year 1899 for 591 prisoners while population of a newly growing city of Karachi was a little more than around hundred thousand people. Now that the city boasts of having around 20 million inhabitants, the same CPK along with District Jail Malir is accommodating more than half of the entire Prison Population in the province of Sindh. (There are around 19000 inmates in 27 Prisons of the province out of which more than 10,000 are incarcerated in these two jails in the city of Karachi). The city requires at least one district jail in its every administrative district so that jails may be easily managed and inmates may get benefit from true correctional programs and initiatives.

== Fine Arts School ==
The Fine Arts School was established in the prison in 2007 and a teacher named Sikandar Ali Jogi was hired to teach the prisoners art education to help them become useful citizens. This initiative was taken by Mr Nusrat Hussain Mangan, the then Superintendent of the jail (who later became DIG and then IG).
