= Arvind Trivedi =

Indian actor (1938–2021)

Member of Parliament, Lok Sabha
- In office 1991–1996
- Preceded by: Maganbhai Patel
- Succeeded by: Nisha Chaudhary
- Constituency: Sabarkantha (Gujarat)

Personal details
- Born: 8 November 1938 Indore, British India (present-day Madhya Pradesh, India)
- Died: 6 October 2021 (aged 82) Mumbai, Maharashtra, India
- Party: Bharatiya Janata Party
- Spouse: Nalini Trivedi (m. 1966)
- Children: 3 daughters
- Relatives: Upendra Trivedi (brother)
- Occupation: Actor, politician
- Known for: Ramayan (1987 TV series) (Ravan character)

Arvind Trivedi (8 November 1938 – 6 October 2021) was an Indian actor and politician from Gujarat. He, alongside his brother Upendra Trivedi, was prolific in Gujarati cinema for over 40 years. He became a household name for playing the role of Ravana in the television series Ramayan (1987). He was elected to the Lok Sabha, lower house of the Parliament of India from Sabarkantha, Gujarat as a member of the Bharatiya Janata Party.

== Biography ==
Arvind Trivedi was born on 8 November 1938 in Indore (now in Madhya Pradesh) to Jethalal Trivedi. He studied to Intermediate level at Bhavan's College in Bombay (now Mumbai). He married Nalini on 4 June 1966. They had three daughters. His brother Upendra Trivedi was also prolific Gujarati film actor.

He is known for portraying Ravan in Ramanand Sagar's television series Ramayan (1987). He acted in other TV series like Vikram Aur Betaal and others. The film Desh Re Joya Dada Pardesh Joya, in which he acted as Dadaji (grandfather), broke many box office records and he is still remembered for the role.

Trivedi acted in about 300 films including Hindi and Gujarati. He had acted in several social and mythological films.

In 1991, Arvind Trivedi was elected as a Member of Parliament from Sabarkatha constituency as a member of Bharatiya Janata Party and was in the office until 1996.

In 2002 he was named as the acting chairman of the Central Board for Film Certification (CBFC). Arvind Trivedi worked as CBFC chief from 20 July 2002 to 16 October 2003.

He had a heart attack around 9:30 on 6 October 2021. He died at his Kandivali residence in Mumbai.

== Recognition ==
Trivedi won seven awards for the best acting in Gujarati films awarded by the Government of Gujarat.

== Selected filmography ==
=== Films ===
Year	Film	Role	Language	Notes
1971	Paraya Dhan		Hindi	
1971	Jesal Toral	Jesal	Gujarati	
1972	Jangal Mein Mangal		Hindi	
1973	Aaj Ki Taaza Khabar	Inspector	Hindi	credited as "Arvind Trivadi"
1973	Ranakdevi		Gujarati	
1974	Kunwarbai Nu Mamerun	Narsinh Mehta	Gujarati	
1974	Trimurti	Balraam	Hindi	Main villain
1974	Hothal Padmini		Gujarati	
1975	Jogidas Khuman		Gujarati	
1975	Shetal Ne Kaanthe		Gujarati	
1976	Vir Mangdavalo		Gujarati	
1976	Santu Rangili		Gujarati	
1977	Paiso Bole Chhe		Gujarati	
1978	Bhagat Gora Kumbhar		Gujarati	
1978	Prem Bandhan		Hindi	
1979	Hum Tere Aashiq Hain	Balraam	Hindi	
1980	Maniyaro		Gujarati	
1982	Dholi		Gujarati	
1989	Sati Toral		Gujarati	
1989	Dada Ne Vahali Dikri		Gujarati	
1998	Desh Re Joya Dada Pardesh Joya	Dadaji	Gujarati	
1985	Veer Mangdawalo	Arshi	Gujarati	
2001	Maiyar Ma Mandu Nathi Lagtu	Dadaji	Gujarati	

=== Television ===
Year	Serial	Role	Channel
1985	Vikram Aur Betaal	Yogi	DD National
1987	Ramayan	Ravana, Vishrava	DD National
1989	Vishwamitra	Sathyavrata Trishanku	DD National
