= Ramesh Mehta (actor) =

Indian actor, comedian and scriptwriter

- Born: Ramesh Girdharlal Mehta; 22 June 1932; Navagam, Gondal State
- Died: 11 May 2012 (aged 79); Rajkot, Gujarat, India
- Occupations: Actor, Comedian, Scriptwriter
- Spouse: Vijayagauri

Ramesh Mehta (22 June 1932 – 11 May 2012) was an Indian actor, comedian and scriptwriter. He is considered to be the "Charlie Chaplin of Gujarat". He has acted in plays and in more than 190 Gujarati films. He wrote the scripts of several Gujarati films, including Hast Melap, Jesal Toral, Ghunghat, Raja Bharathari, Hothal Padamani and Valo Namori.

== Early life ==
Mehta was born in Navagam, in a village near Gondal (now in Gujarat, India), Girdharlal and Muktabahen. He was influenced by his father's interest in literature and used to write and perform in drama plays. When he was six, he acted in a play produced by a drama company operating near his home. While in school, he wrote dialogue for dramas using quotes from Sanskrit Puranas, English plays and classic Gujarati books. When he was 17, he married Vijayagauri, a distant relative of Gujarati poet Amrut Ghayal.

== Career ==
In 1955, he joined the drama company of Irani Sheth. He later accepted a government job for a higher salary, but found it unsuitable. He left the job and worked as a proof reader before moving to Mumbai. With the help of Mansukh Joshi, he joined the Indian National Theatre, a drama institute there, with a monthly salary of 100 rupees. He wrote two plays, Soodi vachche Sopari and Hu Eno Var Chhu. These plays caught the attention of Kalpana Diwan, a Gujarati actress and producer. She gave him shelter for six years. In 1969, he wrote a few scenes for the Gujarati film Hasta Melap when its writer Chaturbhuj Doshi, who was ill, was impressed and made him scriptwriter. He played a supporting role in that film.

He played a comedian in Ravindra Dave's film Jesal Toral (1971), when their actor-comedian Krishnakant had to drop out due to an accident. He succeeded in the role of comedian and acted in more than 190 films. He wrote scripts for 22 films, some not credited. He became a successful actor, and was credited as Siti-Samtrat (The Whistle King) in his film Retina Ratan as film-goers used to whistle when his name appeared in the credits. His comic dual with Rajanibala and later with Manjari Desai became popular. Manjari Desai died in an accident in which Ramesh Mehta survived.

== Death ==
He died on 11 May 2012 at his residence in Rajkot.
