= Arvind Pandya =

Indian actor (1923–1980)

- Born: 21 March 1923; Bhadran, Kaira district, British India
- Died: 22 July 1980 (aged 57)
- Occupation: Actor
- Spouse: Jayaben
- Children: 3 sons, 1 daughter

Arvind Pandya (21 March 1923 – 22 July 1980) was an Indian actor. In his career spanning 35 years, he acted in more than one hundred films including 73 Gujarati films. He also worked in Hindi films and Gujarati theatre.

== Early life ==
Pandya was born on 21 March 1923 in Bhadran. He spent his childhood in Khambhat and Baroda (now Vadodara). His father Ganpatrao was an executive manager in Mandvi branch of Bank of Baroda. His mother's name was Anandiben. He participated in the Indian independence movement and in 1942 Quit India movement.

== Career ==
Pandya went to Bombay (now Mumbai) in 1937 and joined St. Xavier's College where he studied BA in Sanskrit. He studied music at Devdhar Classes and later under Pandharinath Kolhapure. After listening to him at an event at St. Xavier's College, he was selected as a playback singer in Mansarovar (1946) by S. N. Tripathi in which he sang a solo as well as a duet with Shamshad Begum.

To enter Hindi film industry, he visited Fatelal Damle's studio several times in period of six months but was denied. He continued to work in the theatre. He came to an attention of Prakash Picture's director Shantikumar Dave who saw him in his role of Kach in play Kach-Devyani.

Shantikumar cast him in lead role in Gujarati film Bhakta Surdas (1947) in which he also sang several songs. After some Gujarati films, he worked with Meena Kumari in Hindi film Naulakha Haar (1953). He continued to play supporting roles as well as lead roles in Hindi and Gujarati films. He portrayed mostly historical, social and rural characters in these films. In 1960s, he portrayed negative characters. He had played saints as well as bandits in his films. In his career spanning 35 years, he acted in more than one hundred films including 73 Gujarati films. He was known as "Ashok Kumar of Gujarati cinema". Due to his efforts, Laxmi Studio was established in Baroda in 1975.

He continued acting in the Gujarati theatre. His successful plays included Sapnana Sathi, Jesal Toral, Unda Andharethi, Gadh Juno Girnar, Mari Venima Char Char Phool, Swayamsiddha, Major Chandrakant, Pachhale Barane and Sambharana. He received the prize from the Government of Maharashtra for his play Sapnana Sathi.

He was awarded several times for acting by the Government of Gujarat including in 1961 for Kadu Makrani, in 1962 for Nandanvan, in 1963-64 for Jivno Jugari, in 1970 for Majiyara Haiya and in 1975 for Tanariri.

He died on 22 July 1980 following brain hemorrhage.

== Personal life ==
Pandya married Jayaben in 1950, and they had three sons – Hameer, Atri and Deval – and a daughter, Neela.

== Filmography ==
=== Gujarati cinema ===
- Bhakta Surdas (1947)
- Jogidas Khuman (1948)
- Divadandi (1950)
- Bhakt Narsainyo (1952)
- Mulu Manek (1955)
- Kadu Makrani (1960)
- Jogidas Khuman (1962)
- Jivano Jugari (1963)
- Akhand Saubhagyavati (1963)
- Ramat Ramade Ram (1964)
- Kasumbino Rang (1965)
- Mare Javun Pele Par (1968)
- Majiyara Haiya (1969)
- Hasta Melap (1969)
- Sansar Leela (1969)
- Vidhina Lekh (1970)
- Veline Avya Phool (1970)
- Upar Gagan Vishal (1971)
- Kumkum Pagla (1972)
- Ranakdevi (1973)
- Valo Namori / Vala Taro Deshma Danko (1973)
- Amar Premi Sheni Vijanand (1974)
- Okha Haran (1975)
- Mena Gurjari (1975)
- Jogidas Khuman (1975)
- Jai Ranchhod (1975)
- Tana Riri (1975)
- Parbhav ni Preet (1975)
- Veer Champaraj Valo (1975)
- Ra'Navghan (1976)
- Jalamsang Jadeja (1976)
- Sati Jasma Odan (1976)
- Veer Abhal Vallo (1976)
- Daku Rani Ganga (1976)
- Ame Pardesi Paan (1976)
- Ver no Varas (1976)
- Gher Gher Matina Chula (1977)
- Mota Gharni Vahu (1978)
- Nari Tu Narayani (1978)
- Aapo Jadro (1979)
- Paraki Thapan (1979)
- Ganga Sati (1979)
- Jai Bhadrakali (1979)
- Vaya Viramgam (1980)
- Khordani Khandani (1980)
- Alakhne Otle (1980)

=== Hindi cinema ===
- Naulakha Haar (1953)
- Tilottama (1954)
- Rani Rupmati (1959)
- Jai Chittod (1961)
- Tarzan Aur Jadugar (1963)
- Tere Dwar Khada Bhagwan (1964)
- Rustam-e-Rome (1964)
- Hameer Hath (1964)
- Mahabharat (1965)
- Veer Chhatrasal (1971)
- Hari Darshan (1972)
- Mahasati Savitri (1973)
- Alam Ara (1973)
- Andhera (1975)
- Toofan Aur Bijlee (1975)
- Jagadguru Shankaracharya
- Rajpratigya
- Priya
- Bolo He Chakradhari
