= Darbar (title) =

Indian title in Gujarat and Rajasthan

Darbar or Durbar or Darbar Sahib (Gujarati: ISO 15919: Darbār) is a title of honor or respect used mainly in the Indian states of Gujarat and Rajasthan. Chieftain or Lord of small petty princely states, which existed in the pre-independence era, who used title as together with honorific Saheb, to be referred as Darbar Saheb.

Traditionally, it was used to refer to persons belonging to the landed-nobility, who may also be from the communities of Rajputs and sometimes Kathis.

As such, many dominant caste or hereditary chieftain of an erstwhile princely states may be referred to as Darbar in the general use of the word. The title was mostly in use in areas now covered by Gujarat and Rajasthan. However, there is no separate notified caste called Darbar. It was a title of honor more in use during princely India, which was used to refer to chieftains and is prevalent in use even today mainly in rural Gujarat.

== See also ==
- Jagirdar
- Thakur
- Feudalism in India
