= Manhar Raskapur =

Indian film director (1922–1980)

Manhar Rangildas Raskapur
- Born: 8 May 1922
- Died: 14 February 1980 (aged 57)
- Occupation: Film director
- Known for: Gujarati cinema

Manhar Rangildas Raskapur (8 May 1922 – 14 February 1980) was an Indian film director primarily known for his works in Gujarati cinema.

== Biography ==
Raskapur was born in 1922 in Surat, Gujarat, India. He studied up to the first year of college before joining the film industry. He, along with his producer Champsibhai Nagda, was the only person who consistently made Gujarati films during 1940s. His debut film was Jogidas Khuman (1948), which he remade twice. His other best known film was Mendi Rang Lagyo (1960) which became perennial hit. In 1955, he made Rajput war sagas film Mulu Manek in which he introduced Marathi singer Shanta Apte in Gujarati cinema. He adapted Gujarati writer Pannalal Patel's novel Malela Jeev into 1956 eponymous film. In 1966, he directed Kalapi which is a biopic of Gujarati poet Kalapi. In 1978, he directed children film Miya Fuski 007. He had planned the third remake of Jogidas Khuman, but died in 1980 in Halol.

== Filmography ==
As a director:

- Jogidas Khuman (1948)
- Kahyagaro Kanth (1950)
- Kanyadaan (1951)
- Mulu Manek (1955)
- Malela Jeev (1956)
- Kadu Makrani (1960)
- Mendi Rang Lagyo (1960)
- Jogidas Khuman (1962)
- Akhand Saubhagyavati (1963)
- Kalapi (1966)
- Upar Gagan Vishal (1971)
- Vala Tara Deshma Danko (1973)
- Jai Ranchhod (1975)
- Jogidas Khuman (1975)
- Santu Rangili (1976)
- Bhrashtachar Murdabad (1977)
- Mari Hel Utaro Raj (1977)
- Miya Fuski 007 (1978)
- Nari Tu Narayani (1978)
- Saurashtrano Sinh-Chhelbhai (1980)
