= Gunsundari =

Gunsundari or Gunasundari is an Indian name.

== Characters ==
- Gunsundari, a character in The Family-maze of Gunasundari, the second part of Gujarati epic novel Saraswatichandra.

== Films ==
- Gunsundari, a 1927 silent film directed by Chandulal Shah
- Gunsundari, a 1934 Hindi film directed by Chandulal Shah
- Gunsundari, a 1948 Gujarati/Hindi film directed by Ratibhai Punatar
- Gunasundari Katha, 1949 Telugu film by Kadiri Venkata Reddy
- Guna Sundari, a 1955 Tamil film directed by Kamalakara Kameshwara Rao
- Gunsundari No Ghar Sansar, a 1972 Gujarati film directed by Govind Saraiya, based on Saraswatichandra
