= Avinash Vyas =

Indian music composer, lyricist and singer of Gujarati films

- Born: 21 July 1912; Gujarat, India
- Died: 20 August 1984 (aged 72)
- Occupations: Music composer, lyricist, singer
- Years active: 1940–1981
- Known for: Gujarati semi-classical music
- Awards: Padma Shri; Gujarat State Film Award for lyrics Gujarat State Film Award for music Gujarat Rajya Sangeet Nrutya Academy Gaurav Puraskar

Avinash Vyas was an Indian music composer, lyricist and singer of Gujarati films who composed music for over 190 Gujarati films. He was a winner of Gujarat State Film award for the best lyricist and best music 25 times. He was honoured by the Government of India in 1970 with Padma Shri, the fourth highest Indian civilian award.

== Biography ==
Avinash Vyas was born in the Indian state of Gujarat on 21 July 1912 and had his initial music training under Ustad Allauddin Khan. His career started with His Master's Voice for their Young India label where he cut his first gramophone record in 1940 and debuted as a film music composer in with the Gujarati film, Mahasati Ansuya in 1943, partnering the renowned musician, Ustad Alla Rakha. Two more films were released the next year, Krishna Bhakta Bodana and Laheri Badmash but both were not successful. His first major hit came in 1948 with Gunsundari, a bilingual in Gujarati and Hindi.

Vyas composed music for over 1200 songs for 190 Hindi and Gujarati films during his career, his total contribution exceeding 10,000 songs including non film songs. Most of the major singers of that era such as Geeta Dutt, Mohammed Rafi, Lata Mangeshkar, Asha Bhosle, Suman Kalyanpur, Manna Dey, Mukesh, Hemant Kumar, Talat Mehmood, Kishore Kumar, Mahendra Kapoor and Usha Mangeshkar sang his compositions in various movies. He tuned the lines of several noted lyricists like Qamar Jalalabadi, Indeevar, Bharat Vyas and Raja Mehdi Ali Khan. Geeta Dutt was one of his favorite singers and she sang in more Gujarati films than in Bengali films where she originally came from.

Vyas received the Gujarat State annual Film awards 25 times, both for lyrics and compositions, which is reported to be a record. The Gujarat Rajya Sangeet Nrutya Academy awarded him the Gaurav Puraskar and the Government of India honoured him with the civilian award of Padma Shri in 1970. Some of his memorable compositions were compiled and released on 29 March 2012 as a music disc under the name, Avinash Vyas - A Musical Journey. He died on 20 August 1984, at the age of 72, three years after his last film, Bhakta Gora Kumbhar was released.

== Notable songs ==
Year	Song	Film	Lyrics	Singer(s)
1949	Rakh na Ramakada	Mangalfera	Avinash Vyas	Geeta Dutt and A. R. Ojha
1949	Ame Mumbai na rahevasi	Mangalfera	Avinash Vyas	Geeta Roy, Chunilal Pardesi and A. R. Ojha
1950	Ritu anokhi pyar anokha	Har Har Mahadev	Not known	Zohra Ambalewali
1950	Tim tima tim taare	Har Har Mahadev	Ramesh Shastry	Mukesh and Sulochana Kadam
1952	Chamak rahe tare	Rajrani Damyanti	Nilkanth Tiwari	Madhubala Jhaveri
1953	Jane di kismat ki naav	Bhagyawan	Ramesh Gupta	Manna Dey and chorus
1954	B.A., M. A., B. Ed.	Adhikaar	Raja Mehdi Ali Khan	Asha Bhosle and Chorus
1954	Tikadam baazi tikadam bazi	Adhikaar	Raja Mehdi Ali Khan	Kishore Kumar
1954	Sun bhi le Paravardigar dil ki itni si pukar	Malika-e-Aalam Noorjahan	Keshav Trivedi	Asha Bhosle
1954	Ek dharti hai ek hai gagan	Adhikar	Nilkanth Tiwari	Meena Kapoor
1955	Koi dukhiyaari aayi tere dwar	Andheri Nagri Chaupat Raja	Bharat Vyas	Sudha Malhotra
1955	Tere dwar khada Bhagwan	Waman Avtar	Kavi Pradeep	Kavi Pradeep
1955	Bade bade dhoondhe pahaad	Jagatguru Shankaracharya	Bharat Vyas	Hemant Kumar
1955	Deep jal raha hai	Andheri Nagri Chaupat Raja	Bharat Vyas	Talat Mahmood
1955	Ek baar to mil lo gale	Andheri Nagri Chaupat Raja	Bharat Vyas	Talat Mahmood and Sudha Malhotra
1957	Aaj nahin to kal	Nagmani	Kavi Pradeep	Geeta Dutt
1957	Aaj nahi to kal bikharenge ye badal	Nagmani	Kavi Pradeep	Geeta Dutt
1957	Pollam poll	Laxmi	Qamar Jalabadi	Mohammad Rafi
1957	Pinjre ke panji re	Nagmani	Kavi Pradeep	Kavi Pradeep
1957	So ja re mere laal	Aadhi Roti	Bharat Vyas	Geeta Dutt
1960	Mehndi te Vavi Malve	Mendi Rang Lagyo	Avinash Vyas	Lata Mangeshkar
1960	Tere bangle ki babu main maina	Bhakt Raj	Bharat Vyas	Shamshad Begum
1960	Aa Mumbai chhe	Mendi Rang Lagyo	Chandrakant Solanki	Manna Dey
1962	Ja re badal ja	Kailashpati	Madan Bharati	Lata Mangeshkar
1974	Ek patan sher ni naar padmani	Lakho Fulani	Avinash Vyas	Mahendra Kapoor, Asha Bhosle
1977	Hoon Amdavad no rikshawalo	Maa Baap	Rui Raj	Kishore Kumar
1984	Pankhida Ne Aa Pinjru (પંખીડાને આ પીંજરું)	Dharti Na Ami	Avinash Vyas	Mukesh, Asha Bhosle

== Filmography ==
Vyas is credited with over 190 films in Gujarati and Hindi.

1. Mahasati Ansuya (1943)
2. Krishna Bhakta Bodana (1944)
3. Laheri Badmash (1944)
4. Gunsundari (1948)
5. Varasdar (1948)
6. Jivan Palto (1948)
7. Jesal Toral (1948)
8. Mangalfera (1949)
9. Gadano Bel (1950)
10. Har Har Mahadev (1950)
11. Veer Bhimsen (1950)
12. Dashavtar (1951)
13. Jai Mahalaxmi (1951)
14. Ram Janma (1951)
15. Shri Vishnu Bhagwan (1951)
16. Rajrani Damyanti (1952)
17. Shiv Shakti (1952)
18. Vasna (1952)
19. Bhagyawan (1953)
20. Teen Batti Char Raasta (1953)
21. Chakradhari (1954)
22. Maha Pooja (1954)
23. Malika-E-Alam Noorjehan (1954)
24. Adhikaar (1954)
25. Andher Nagri Choupat Raja (1955)
26. Vaman Avtar (1955)
27. Ekadashi (1955)
28. Jagadguru Shankaracharya (1955)
29. Riyasat (1955)
30. Dwarikadheesh (1956)
31. Sudarshan Chakra (1956)
32. Lakshmi (1957)
33. Naag Mani (1957)
34. Ram Laxman (1957)
35. Sant Raghu (1957)
36. Aadhi Roti (1957)
37. Gopichand (1958)
38. Great Show of India (1958)
39. Jung Bahadur (1958)
40. Pati Parmeshwar (1958)
41. Ram Bhakti (1958)
42. Charnon Ki Dasi (1959)
43. Grihalakshmi (1959)
44. Kadu Makrani (1960)
45. Mendi Rang Lagyo (1960)
46. Bhakta Raj (1960)
47. Heron Malaat (1961)
48. Hawa Mahal (1962)
49. Kailashpati (1962)
50. Bapu Ne Kaha Tha (1962)
51. Royal Mail (1963)
52. Bhakta Dhruva Kumar (1964)
53. Kalapi (1966)
54. Badmash (1969)
55. Beti Tumhare Jaisi (1969)
56. Surya Devata (1969)
57. Taqat Aur Talwar (1970)
58. Jesal Toral (1971)
59. Maha Sati Savitri (1973)
60. Ranakdevi (1973)
61. Daku Aur Bhagwan (1975)
62. Malavpati Munj (1976)
63. Lakho Phulani (1976, lyrics)
64. Sonbaini Chundadi (1976)
65. Vir Mangdavalo (1976)
66. Maa Baap (1979)
67. Bhakta Gora Kumbhar (1981)

== See also ==
- Ustad Allauddin Khan
- Ustad Alla Rakha
