= Bansari (1943 film) =

- Directed by: Jayant Desai
- Produced by: Chandulal Shah
- Starring: Ishwarlal; Noor Mohammed Charlie; Shamim Bano; Urmila; Dixit
- Music by: Gyan Dutt
- Production company: Ranjit Studios
- Release date: 1943
- Country: India
- Language: Hindi

Bansari (transl. The Flute) is a Bollywood social film. It was released in 1943. Music composition was by Gyan Dutt with lyrics written by D. N. Madhok. The film was produced by Chandulal Shah for Ranjit Studios. Directed by Jayant Desai, it starred Ishwarlal, Noor Mohammed Charlie, Dixit, Shamim Bano, Kesari and Urmila.

The film had Charlie playing a "social parasite" and the acting was severely criticised by the critic of "Filmindia" as "putrid" and "obscene". The film however was a big success at the box-office. This was also Charlie's last film for Ranjit Studios as he became a "freelancer" soon after.

== Cast ==
- Ishwarlal
- Charlie
- Shamim Bano
- Dixit
- Kesari
- Urmila
- Bhagwandas

== Jayant Desai ==
The film was Jayant Desai's last one for Ranjit Studios. He had started his career with Ranjit since 1929 as an assistant and went on to become a "stock director", directing films, which Chandulal Shah "did not want to direct". Desai left Ranjit in 1943 to form his own company "Jayant Desai Productions" under which his first film was Bhaktaraj (1943).

== Soundtrack ==
Bansuri had music composed by Gyan Dutt and the lyricist were D. N. Madhok and Pandit Indra. The singers were Noor Mohammed Charlie, Shamim Akhtar, Leela Sawant and Bulo C. Rani.

=== Songlist ===
#	Title	Singer	Lyricist
1	"Aaya Aaya Karo Idhar Bhi Meri Jaan"	Noor Mohammed Charlie	D. N. Madhok
2	"Cham Cham Chamke Jyoti Sakhi Ri"	Shamim	D. N. Madhok
3	"Dard Jaaye Na"	Shamim	Pandit Indra
4	"Dil Lagaya Tha Dillagi Ke Liye"		D. N. Madhok
5	"Jab Se Mali Teri Dar Ki Khak"		D. N. Madhok
6	"Hum Tumse Mangte Hain"	Amirbai Karnataki	D. N. Madhok
7	"Kachche Rang Tihare Sajanwa"	Ishwarlal, Shamim	D. N. Madhok
8	"Mere Man Ko Meri Jaan Ko"	Charlie	D. N. Madhok
9	"Rasiya Ho Rasiya Ho Hamare Raja Vilayti"	Leela Sawant, Bulo C Rani	Pandit Indra
