= Chandrahasa (disambiguation) =

Chandrahasa is a king of the Kuntala kingdom in Hindu mythology.

Chandrahasa may also refer to:

- Chandrahasa (Hinduism), in the Hindu epic Ramayana, an indestructible sword that Shiva gifts Ravana
- Chandrahasa (1933 film), a Hindi mythological costume drama film
- Chandrahasa (1965 film), an Indian Kannada-language film
