= Noor Mohammed Charlie =

Pakistani actor (1911–1983)

- نور محمد چارلی
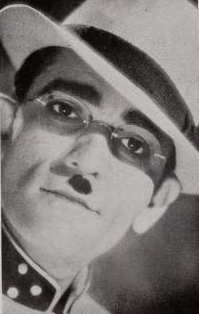
- Charlie in Musafir (1940)
- Born: Noor Mohammed Memon; 1 July 1911; Ranavav village, Porbandar, Saurashtra, British India
- Died: 30 June 1983 (aged 71); Karachi, Sindh, Pakistan
- Occupations: Actor, singer, director
- Years active: 1925–1969
- Children: 12

Noor Mohammed Charlie (Urdu: نور محمد چارلی，1 July 1911 – 30 June 1983), popularly known as Charlie, was a Pakistani actor and comedian.

Best known for his comedy roles, he was the first 'star' comedian and has been referred to as India's first comedy king. He acted with several top actresses of the day as a comic hero. Being a great fan of Charlie Chaplin, he took "Charlie" as his screen name following the release of his popular film The Indian Charlie (1933). He had a successful career in pre-partition India from 1925–1946. After shifting to Pakistan following the partition of India he acted in less than a dozen films.

He shifted to the US to live with his son and returned later to Pakistan where he died in 1983.

== Early life ==
Noor Mohammed was born in 1911 in Ranavav village, Porbandar, Saurashtra, British India into a Memon family. Hating school as a young boy, Noor Mohammed often played truant to visit cinema theatres. At an early age he started working to repair broken umbrellas. In 1925 he was employed by the Imperial Film Company at Rs. 40 a month when he walked boldly in, announcing that he could sing.

== Career ==
=== British India ===
Charlie made his debut in Krishna Film Company's Akalna Bardan (1928) directed by Prafulla Ghosh. At this time he was billed as Noor Mohammed and did other films like Lekh Par Mekh and Vasant Leela. In 1929 he was signed up by Elfin Film Company for The Indian Charlie which was however not released till 1933. Ezra Mir directed film Zarina in 1932 with the advent of Talkies made him a popular actor. He acted under Ezra Mir in one more film Premi Pagal (1933) and with Sarvottam Badami in Chandrahasa (1933). These films made him very popular with the audience. Finally, in 1933 The Indian Charlie was released which "became such a huge sensation", catapulting him to stardom. The success of the film was the reason for the change of name to Noor Mohammed "Charlie", and in later films as just "Charlie".

In 1934, Charlie joined Ranjit Film Company acting in successful films like Toofani Taruni (1934), Toofan Mail (1934) and Barrister's Wife (1935). He often co-starred with other famous comedians like Dixit and Ghory. The 1940s saw him acting in several hit films. Musafir (1940), directed by Chaturbhuj Doshi, in which Charlie played a foreign-returned prince who on his return finds his kingdom in a mess, became very popular. Other films of this time include Dhandora (1941), which he directed, A. R. Kardar's Pagal (1941), Jayant Desai's Bansari (1943), Mehboob Khan's Taqdeer (1943), Jayant Desai's Manorama (1944), Mahesh Chandra's Chand Tara (1945), Zia Sarhadi's Yateem (1945) and Phani Majumdar's Insaaf (1946). He starred with top actresses like Swarnalata, Mehtab and Leela Chitnis. He sang with artists like Suraiya and Amirbai Karnataki. At the height of his success he charged more than Prithviraj Kapoor and other top stars of that time.

=== Pakistan ===
Following the Partition of India in 1947, Charlie opted to live in Pakistan. His first film in Pakistan was the Daud Chand directed Mundri (1949) in Punjabi. He then did Nazeer Ajmeri's Beqarar (1950), both films were well appreciated. Though he went on to act in about a dozen Urdu, Sindhi and Punjabi films in Pakistan, not all were successful. He came back to India in 1960 and acted in three films; Zameen Ke Taare (1960), Zamana Badal Gaya (1961) and Akeli Mat Jaiyo (1963). According to Sanjit Narwekar in his book Eena Meena Deeka: The Story of Hindi Film Comedy, the Indian Government at that time refused Charlie citizenship and he had to return to Pakistan. After acting in a few more Lollywood films, Charlie went to US to join his son.

== Family and death ==
Noor Mohammed Charlie had six sons and six daughters. He returned to Pakistan from US and died on 30 June 1983 in Karachi, Sindh, Pakistan. His one son was a renowned film and TV actor, Latif Charlie, who died on 19 July 2011 at the age of 75. Noor Mohammed's grandson through Latif Charlie is Yawar Charlie, who was a former actor having acted in TV episodes of JAG and General Hospital and now specialises in West Hollywood CA Homes and Property Listings. His gay wedding made headlines in South Asia Another grandson, again through Latif Charlie, is RJ Dino Ali. His other grandson through another son, Noorarash Charlie, is a designer/theater actor based in Tehran.

== Influences ==
Chandulal Shah, the owner of Ranjit Film Company stated in one of his interviews that Charlie "ruled the roost" among comedians. According to film historian Harish Raghuvanshi as quoted in Times of India, "Noor Mohammed developed a style of comedy of his own, which influenced great comedians like Johnny Walker and Mehmood." Abrar Alvi mentions that Johnny Walker was a "great admirer" of Charlie and copied his body style and "mannerisms".

He was the first comedian to have songs picturised on him. His "Palat Tera Dhyan Kidhar Hai", under the music direction of Naushad and with lyrics by Arshad Gujarati remains popular with copies in later films. His other popular song was "Zindagi Hai Fareb Fareb Se Nibhaaye Jaa" from Chand Tara (1945). This trend of a singing comedian was later picked up by Johnny Walker and Mehmood. His film Barrister's Wife (1935) had the first filmi qawwali picturised on him to appear in Indian Cinema, "Nazariya Taane Hai Teer Kaman", composed by Rewashankar, and "Banne Khan", with lyrics by Pandit Narayan Prasad Betaab.

== Filmography ==
=== India ===
Year	Film	Director
1932	Sharafi Loot	D. N. Madhok
1932	Zarina	Ezra Mir
1932	Premi Pagal	Ezra Mir
1933	The Indian Charlie	
1933	Chandrahasa	Sarvottam Badami
1934	Mohabbat Ki Kasauti	P. C. Barua
1934	Toofan Mail	Jayant Desai
1934	Toofani Taruni	Chandulal Shah
1934	Sitamgarh	Jayant Desai
1934	Farzand-e-Hind aka Leatherface	Vijay Bhatt
1934	Nadira	Jayant Desai
1935	Noor-e-Watan	Jayant Desai
1935	Keemti Aansu	Chandulal Shah
1935	Raat Ki Rani	
	College Kanya	
1935	Barrister's Wife	Chandulal Shah
1935	Desh Dasi	Chandulal Shah
1936	Sipahi Ki Sajni	Chandulal Shah
1936	Laheri Laila	Jayant Desai
1936	Rangila Raja	Jayant Desai
1936	Raj Ramani	Jayant Desai
1936	Jwalamukhi	D. N. Madhok
1936	Chalak Chor	Raja Sandow
1936	Matlabi Duniya	Jayant Desai
1936	Dil Ka Daku	D. N. Madhok
1937	Dil Farosh	D. N. Madhok
1937	Pardesi Pankhi	Chandulal Shah
1937	Shama Parwana	D. N. Madhok
1937	Zambo	M. D. Bhavnani
	Zameen Ka Chand	Jayant Desai
1938	Secretary	Chaturbhuj Doshi
1938	Ghunghatwali	Kanjibhai Rathod
1938	Rikshawala	Ezra Mir
1938	Bazigar	Manibhai Vyas
1939	Ban Ki Chidiya	Jayant Desai
1939	Nadi Kinare	Manibhai Vyas
1939	Thokar	A. R. Kardar
1940	Aaj Ka Hindustan	Jayant Desai
1940	Achhut	Chandulal Shah
1940	Musafir	Chandulal Shah
1941	Dhandora	Charlie
1941	Pagal	A. R. Kardar
1943	Taqdeer	Mehboob Khan
1943	Sanjog	A. R. Kardar
1943	Bansari	Jayant Desai
1943	Pagli	Shankar Mehta
1944	Raunaq	Dwarka Khosla
1944	Manorama	Jayant Desai
1944	Us Paar	Chimanlal M. Luhar
1945	Ghazal	Zahur Raja
1945	Chand Tara	Mahesh Chandra
1945	Yateem	Zia Sarhadi
1946	Aayi Bahar	Shankar Mehta
1946	Dulha	Manibhai Vyas
1946	Insaf	Phani Majumdar
1960	Zameen Ke Taare	Chandulal Shah
1961	Zamana Badal Gaya	Jayant Desai
1963	Akeli Mat Jaiyo	Nandlal Jaswantlal

=== Pakistan ===
Year	Film	Language	Director
1950	Beqarar	Urdu	Nazir Ajmeri
1951	Akeli	Urdu	M. M. Mehra
1956	Umar Marvi	Sindhi	Sheikh Hassan
1958	Pardesi	Sindhi	S. A. Ghaffar
1958	Sitaron Ki Dunya	Urdu	M. H. Mohib
1958	Prai Zamin	Urdu	Sheikh Hassan
1965	Pilpili Sahib	Urdu	Aslam Irani
1967	Kafir	Urdu	M. Saleem
1969	Pyar Ki Jeet	Urdu	Jameel Mirza
