= Thokar =

- Film poster ad in Filmindia (1939)
- Directed by: A. R. Kardar
- Written by: M. Sadiq
- Produced by: Chandulal Shah
- Starring: Madhuri; Kumar; Charlie; Waheedan Bai; Ram Marathe
- Cinematography: Gordhanbhai Patel
- Music by: Gyan Dutt
- Production company: Ranjit Movietone
- Release date: 1939
- Country: India
- Languages: Hindi; Urdu

Thokar also called The Kick is a 1939 Indian Hindi-Urdu film directed by A. R. Kardar. Produced by Chandulal Shah for his production banner Ranjit Movietone, it has music by Gyan Dutt. The story writer was M. Sadiq, with cinematography by Gordhanbhi Patel. The cast included Kumar, Ishwarlal, Madhuri, Yakub, Noor Mohammed Charlie, Ram Marathe, Waheedan Bai and Dixit. The story involves a blind villager winning a lottery but he eventually realises that money can not bring happiness.

Thokar is cited as one of the "most interesting" films made by Kardar for Ranjit Movietone. The other was Pagal (1940). Baburao Patel, editor of the film magazine Filmindia, called it one of the "good social pictures" and "the best" from Chandulal Shah.

== Plot ==
Mohan is a poor blind villager taking care of his ward Radha, who is in love with him. The village tramp, Ramesh (Charlie) sells him a lottery ticket. To Mohan's astonishment, he wins the sweep-stakes but Ramesh wants his share. Ramesh takes Mohan to the city with the intention of getting his eyes treated. In the city, Ramesh deviously gets Mohan married off to a prostitute who is having an affair with Ramesh. When Mohan's eyesight is restored, he sees his wealth diminishing, and an adulterous wife. He takes revenge on Ramesh and his wife. Mohan finally returns to the village and to Radha.

== Cast ==
- Ishwarlal
- Madhuri as Radha
- Kumar as Mohan
- Charlie as Ramesh
- Yakub
- Waheedan Bai
- Dixit
- Ram Marathe
- Suresh
- K. N. Singh
- Wasti

== Soundtrack ==
Charlie has been cited as "the first (Indian) comedian to have songs picturised on him", starting the trend with the song from Thokar, "Jab Se Mali Teri Khak". The music was composed by Gyan Dutt and the lyricist was Pyare Lal Santoshi. The singers were Waheedan Bai, Suresh, Ram Marathe and Charlie.

=== Song list ===
#	Title	Singer
1	"Achchhe Isa Ho Marizon Ka Kayal Achhha Ho"	Waheedan
2	"Aankhon Aankhon Mein Pila Di Mere Saqi Ne"	Waheedan
3	"Ae Zamane Phir Se Ram Milaye Jodi"	
4	"Jabse Gaye Banwari	Madhuri, Suresh, Ram Marathe
5	"Jeevan Ka Sukh Prem Hai"	
6	"Jhan Jhan Jhan Sajan Bole"	
7	"Kaali Kaali Jo Ghata Chhayi Hai"	Waheedan Bai
8	"Main Banoon Nadi Main Banoon Kinara"	Waheedan, Charlie
9	"Suno Brij Ki Ek Kahani"	
10	"Jab Se Mali Teri Khak"	Charlie
