= Holi (1940 film) =

- Film poster
- Directed by: A. R. Kardar
- Written by: M. Sadiq
- Produced by: Chandulal Shah
- Starring: Motilal; Khursheed; Sitara Devi; Ishwarlal
- Cinematography: Krishna Gopal
- Music by: Khemchand Prakash
- Production company: Ranjit Movietone
- Release date: 1940
- Running time: 137 minutes
- Country: India
- Language: Hindi

Holi (Festival Of Colour) is a 1940 Hindi/Urdu social drama film directed by A. R. Kardar. Holi was produced by Ranjit Movietone and had music composed by Khemchand Prakash with lyrics by D. N. Madhok. It had Khursheed and Motilal starring in the lead with Sitara Devi, Ishwarlal, Keshavrao Date, Dixit, Ghory and Manohar Kapoor.

With two love stories as a format, the film pits the rich against the poor, in the shape of two pairs of lovers; a poor-girl-rich-boy, and a rich-boy-poor-girl. The film showed Motilal as a villain who reforms through the love of Kokila, played by Khursheed.

== Plot ==
The film starts with a Holi scene, with the people being drenched in colour. Sunder (Ishwarlal) is a poor man who lives with his mother and sister Kokila (Khursheed). Champa (Sitara Devi), an artist, is the daughter of a wealthy Seth (business man). Champa and Sunder meet and fall in love. Chand (Motilal), also from a rich family lusts after Kokila. Sunder is framed by the evil Chand and his father (Keshavrao Date) on a robbery charge and he is caught by the police and put in jail. While he's behind bars his sister is kidnapped by Chand, who wants to marry her. When Sunder is released from jail he is told about his sister being kidnapped. However, love for Kokila has changed Chand from the villainous character and reformed him. He is due to marry Kokila. Suraj, unaware of the change and the impending marriage, rushes in and stabs Chand. Chand is rushed to the hospital. While he's battling for his life, the court procedures begin against Sunder. Finally, Chand turns up in court aided by Champa, to prove he's alive. The film ends on a happy note, with the two pairs of lovers uniting.

== Cast ==
- Motilal as Chand
- Khursheed as Kokila
- Ishwarlal as Sunder
- Sitara Devi as Champa
- Keshavrao Date as Mangaldas
- Dixit
- Ghory
- Lala Yakub as the Judge
- Tara Bai
- Manohar Kapoor
- Mirza Musharraf
- Bhagwandas

== Reception ==
Ishwarlal in Holi

Baburao Patel, editor of Filmindia, in his review of Holi, called the film a "little harmless entertainment, bereft of common sense", while commending the actor Ishwarlal for doing a good job. Keshavrao Date was criticised for accepting a meaningless role. Patel stated that Motilal's talents were "wasted" in the film.

== Soundtrack ==
The music director was Khemchand Prakash, with lyrics by D. N. Madhok. The notable songs were "Phagun Ki Rut Aayi Re" sung by Sitara Devi and Amritlal, and "Oonchi Nigahon Ke Teer" sung by Miss Kalyani.

=== Songlist ===
#	Title	Singer
1	"Oonchi Nigahon Ke Teer"	Kalyani
2	"Phaagan Ki Rut Aai Re"	Sitara Devi, Amiratlal
3	"Bach Ke Raho"	Sitara Devi, Miss Kalyani, Amritlal Nagar
4	"Dhanwalon Ki Duniya Hai Yeh"	Sitara Devi, Kantilal
5	"Jeevan Mein Saras Savera Aaya"	
6	"Kyun Sajan, Kyun Sajni Dil Mera Baitha Jaaye"	
7	"Laakh Chhupaye Koi Man Mein"	Motilal, Amiratlal
8	"Meri Sun Le Toh"	Vasanti
9	"Naina Sharabi Rung Tore Kalejwa Pe Kar Gayo Waar"	Sitara Devi
10	"Pagle Man Kise Sunata Hai"	Kantilal
11	"Pihu Bahaar Gaaye Ja"	Sitara Devi
12	"Preet Kiye Pachhtaye Sajan"	Sitara Devi, Kantilal
13	"Sajna Hum Tum Bhaye Udas"	Miss Kalyani
