= Fariyaad =

- Directed by: Jayant Desai
- Produced by: Chandulal Shah
- Starring: Mubarak; Ishwarlal; Shamim Bano; Noor Jehan
- Music by: Khemchand Prakash
- Production company: Ranjit Studios
- Release date: 1942
- Country: India
- Language: Hindi

Fariyaad (transl. The Complaint) is a 1942 Bollywood film directed by Jayant Desai and starring Shamim, Mubarak, Ishwarlal, Rama Shukul and Noor Jehan. The film was made for producer Chandulal Shah's Ranjit Studios.

== Cast ==
- Shamim Bano
- Ishwarlal
- Noor Jehan
- Rama Shukul
- Mubarak
- Devi Mukherjee

== Soundtrack ==
The film had lyrics written by D. N. Madhok and music was composed by Khemchand Prakash. The songs were sung by Shamim, Ishwarlal, Rajkumari and Binapani Mukherjee.

=== Song list ===
#	Title	Singer(s)
1	"Aye Dil Bekarar Bol Kahe Tu Asha"	Shamim
2	"Phir Chhayi Badariya Kaali"	Shamim
3	"Kaho Ji Jee Na Lage Bin Tere"	Shamim, Ishwarlal
4	"Kitab Mujhko Banata Toh Tera Kya Jata"	Ishwarlal
5	"Rasiya Aa Aaja Rasiya"	Shamim, Ishwarlal
6	"Yaad Kisi Ki Aayi"	Ishwarlal
7	"Saiya Na Jaiyo"	Rajkumari
8	"Subah Hui Aur Yaad Tihari Mohe Lagi Satane"	Binapani Mukherjee
9	"Mithi Mithi Peer"	
