= Mangalfera =

- Directed by: Ratibhai Punatar
- Written by: Vaju Kotak (story), Ramchandra Thakur (screenplay)
- Based on: Shaadi (1941)
- Starring: Nirupa Roy; Dulari; Shanti Madhok; Manhar Desai
- Cinematography: H. S. Kwatra
- Edited by: B. C. Vyas
- Music by: Avinash Vyas
- Production company: Ajit Pictures
- Release date: 1949
- Running time: 139 minutes
- Country: India
- Language: Gujarati

Mangalfera is 1949 Indian Gujarati social drama film directed by Ratibhai Punatar. It starred Nirupa Roy and Manhar Desai in lead roles and was a remake of the 1941 Hindi film Shaadi.

== Plot ==
In their childhood, Shobha and Mangal's fathers, in order to ensure their friendship, decide to engage them at a young age. However, as Shobha grows up, her wealthy and arrogant father breaks his promise and insists on marrying her off to a rich groom. Nirupa runs away from home and, while wandering, comes across a poor disabled man working as a porter outside a small railway station. She is shocked to discover him as Mangal whom she was engaged to in her childhood. She marries him.

Suddenly, this poor couple is buried under snow during a blizzard, but they emerge unharmed and, miraculously, Mangal is completely healed of his disability. He becomes healthy as well as rich. His friends take him to a tawaif Mena who seduced him. As a result, Mangal abandons his wife Shobha. Sobha attempts suicide.

Like Shobha, her sister Chandrika has also been abandoned by her father. Two comedians work tirelessly to marry her. Dulari has made a vow to fix Shobha's marriage life. With good intentions, Chandrika tries to seduce Mangal again. Mangal realizes that he is trapped in marrying a disabled lady. Thus he returns to Shobha.

== Cast ==
The cast is as follows:

- Nirupa Roy as Shobha
- Dulari as Chandrika
- Sarita Devi
- Shanti Madhok as Mena, a tawaif
- Manhar Desai as Mangal
- Babu Raje
- Chhagan Romeo
- Bhagwandas
- Ibrahim
- Maruti
- Kamlakant
- Barkat Virani
- Haridas
- Popat

== Production ==
The film was a remake of Ranjit Studios' 1941 film Shaadi. It was directed by Ratibhai Punatar and the assistant director was A. D. Vyas. The art was directed by S. A. Wahab while costumes were designed by Bhupatrai Oza. Make-up was done by D. S. Gokhale. The film was developed at Ranjit's laboratory.

== Soundtrack ==
There are following songs in the film:

Mangalfera

Soundtrack album by Avinash Vyas
- Released: 1949
- Genre: Feature film soundtrack
- Language: Gujarati
- Label: His Master's Voice

All lyrics are written by Avinash Vyas; all music is composed by Avinash Vyas.

Track listing
No.	Title	Singer(s)	Length
1.	"Taalio Na Taale, Gori Garbe Ghumi Gay Re"	Geeta Dutt, Chorus	3:23
2.	"Sanam Mari Kasam Tari, Ughadi Rakhje Bari"	Chunilal Pardeshi	3:18
3.	"Rakhna Ramakda Mara Rame Ramta Rakhya Re"	Geeta Dutt, A. R. Oza	3:34
4.	"Gozari Dhartini.. Aa Pagthare Kya Javu Mare?"	Geeta Dutt
5.	"Mara Manda Kera Mor, Jagine Jou To"	Geeta Dutt, A. R. Oza	3:14
6.	"Diwana Tamari Diwani Bani Chhu"	Zohrajan Ambalewali	3:13
7.	"Tara Nayan Kera Baan, Ho Balam, Kaadhe Mora Pran"	Zohrajan Ambalewali
8.	"Ame Mumbai Na Rahevasi, Charni Road Par"	Geeta Dutt, A. R. Oza, Chunilal Pardeshi	3:20
9.	"Bhulu Bhutkar Toye, Kal Jevo Yaad Aave Che"	Geeta Dutt	3:17

"Rakhna Ramakada" became hit and earned Vyas a royalty of about 20,000 rupees. Geeta Dutt's "Taalio Na Taale" and "Gozari Dhartini.." became popular too.

== Reception ==
The film was moderately successful on box office. The film confirmed the status of Punatar as a leading Gujarati film director succeeding his previous 1948 hit film Gunsundari.

Ashok Dave of Gujarat Samachar criticises the plot and 'quality' of the film. He criticises performance of Roy and Desai but praises comic performances of Chhagan Romeo. He attributes success of the film to its music of Avinash Vyas and songs sung by Geeta Dutt.
