= Uss Paar (film) =

- Directed by: Chamman Lal Lohar
- Starring: Swaran Lata; Sulochana Chatterjee; Noor Mohammed Charlie; Chandra Mohan; Ishwarlal
- Music by: Feroz Nizami
- Distributed by: Sun Art Pictures
- Release date: 1944
- Country: India
- Language: Hindi

Uss Paar is a Bollywood film starring Ishwarlal. It was released in 1944.

== Cast ==
- Swaran Lata
- Sulochana Chatterjee
- Noor Mohammed Charlie
- Chandra Mohan
- Ishwarlal
