= Jayant Desai =

Indian film director and producer (1909–1976)

- Born: Jayantilal Jhinabhai Desai; 28 February 1909; Surat, Gujarat, India
- Died: 19 April 1976 (aged 67); Mumbai, India
- Occupation: Film director

Jayant Desai (born Jayantilal Jhinabhai Desai, 28 February 1909 – 19 April 1976) was an Indian film director and producer. After graduating from the University of Bombay Desai joined Ranjit Studios in 1929 where he directed numerous films including Toofani Toli (1937), Tansen (1943), Har Har Mahadev (1950) and Amber (1952). Tansen was the second highest grossing Indian film of 1943. Besides film direction he also acted in several films. In 1943 he left Ranjit Studios to found his own production company, Jayant Desai Productions. In 1960s he founded Jupiter Films and Hemlata Pictures.

== Biography ==
Desai was born in Surat on 28 February 1909. He had graduated from University of Bombay.

=== Ranjit film company ===
In 1929 Desai joined Ranjit Film Company, where he initially worked as an assistant director for Chandulal Shah's Rajputani and Nandlal Jaswantlal's Pahadi Kanya. His first independent directorial work was the 1930 film Noor-e-Watan (Translation: Glory of the nation). A few films he had directed while working as an assistant director at Ranjit Film company were Do Badmash (1932), Char Chakram (1932) and Bhutio Mahal (1932) featuring Ghory and Dixit who were called the Indian Laurel and Hardy. One of his films Toofani Toli (1937) was a commercial success and earned him reputation as a director of comedy films. His 1938 film Billi was loosely based on Damsel in Distress. He had directed the 1943 historical film Tansen based on the life of classical musician Tansen who was one of the navratnas in the court of Mughal emperor Akbar. The film was the second highest grossing Indian film of that year.

=== Later career ===
By 1943, Desai was one of the leading directors of Ranjit Studios and had starred in many mythological films like Veer Babruwahan (1934) with Eddie Bilimoria in the lead role. In the same year he left Ranjit studios and started his own production company; Jayant Desai Productions. The 1944 film Manorama was his first film under his own production banner. He had directed the 1952 Raj Kapoor and Nargis starrer film Amber. and the 1950 blockbuster hit Hindu mythological film Har Har Mahadev featuring Trilok Kapoor as Shiva and Nirupa Roy as Parvati. In the film Ambar, Tanuja played the role of Nargis' character's childhood. During the shooting of one of his films Bansuri, singer Mukesh met Raj Kapoor, who was the film's assistant director. This meeting helped establish the career of Mukesh. Desai had directed the 1940 film Diwali. As an independent producer, he founded Jupiter Films and Hemlata Pictures in the early 1960s. He had directed the 1945 historical film Samrat Chandragupta (translation:Emperor Chandragupta) based on the life of Chandragupta Maurya, the founder of the Mauryan Empire, and the Kundan Lal Saigal musical film Tadbir (1945) in which Shashi Kapoor (then 7 years old) acted as a child artist. He had directed the 1935 film College Girl.

== Filmography ==
As Director

- Noor-E-Watan (1930)
- Jawan Mard (1930)
- Joban Na Jadu (1930)
- Vilasi Atma (1931)
- Vijay Lakshmi (1931)
- Mukti Sangram (1931)
- Katil Katari (1931)
- Banke Sawariya (1931)
- Sipahsalar (1932)
- Lal Swar (1932)
- Fauladi Pahelwan (1932)
- Do Badmash (1932)
- Char Chakram (1932)
- Bhutio Mahal (1932)
- Krishna Sudama (1933)
- Bhool Bhulaiyan (1933)
- Bhola Shikar (1933)
- Veer Babruwahan (1934)
- Toofan Mail (1934)
- Sitamgarh (1934)
- Nadira (1934)
- Noor-E-Watan (1935)
- College Kanya (1935)
- Rangila Raja (1936)
- Raj Ramani (1936)
- Matlabi Duniya (1936)
- Laheri Lala (1936)
- Zameen Ka Chand (1937)
- Toofani Toli (1937)
- Mitti Ka Putla (1937)
- Prithvi Putra (1938)
- Billi (The Cat) (1938)
- Ban Ki Chidiya (1938)
- Sant Tulsidas (1939)
- Diwali (1940)
- Aaj Ka Hindustan (1940)
- Shaadi (1941)
- Beti (1941)
- Fariyaad (1942)
- Chandni (1942)
- Zaban (1943)
- Tansen (1943)
- Bhaktaraj (1943)
- Bansari (1943)
- Manorama (1944)
- Lalkar (1944)
- Tadbir (1945)
- Samrat Chandragupta (1945)
- Maharana Pratap (1946)
- Veer Bhimsen (film)|Veer Bhimsen (1950)
- Shaan (1950)
- Har Har Mahadev (1950)
- Shri Ganesh Janma (1951)
- Dasavtaar (1951)
- Shiv Shakti (1952)
- Nishan Danka (1952)
- Amber (1952)
- Naya Raasta (1953)
- Manchala (1953)
- Hazaar Raaten (1953)
- Shiv Ratri (1954)
- Miss Mala (1954)
- Sati Madalasa (1955)
- Hamara Watan (1956)
- Basant Panchami (1956)
- Lakshmi Pooja (1957)
- Zamana Badal Gaya (1961)
