= Khemchand Prakash =

Film music composer (1907-1950)

- Khemchand Prakash

Background information
- Born: 12 December 1907; Sujangarh, Bikaner State, Rajputana, British India
- Died: 10 August 1950 (aged 42) due to Liver Cirrhosis
- Genres: Hindustani classical music, Indian film music
- Occupations: composer, music director
- Years active: 1935 – 1949
- Spouse(s): Kanhi Bai and Shreedevi

Khemchand Prakash (12 December 1907 – 10 August 1950) was a music composer in the Hindi film industry. He had few peers in 1940s, the decade for Indian film music which started with Saigal very active on the scene and ended with Lata Mangeshkar firmly established in the industry. Lata had fruitful association with him (in films Asha, Ziddi (1948), Mahal(1949)) when she started making a name for herself. Khemchand introduced Lata Mangeshkar and Kishore Kumar to music industry.

Many years after Khemchand Prakash's death, the composer Kamal Dasgupta rated him the best composer.

== Career ==
Born in Sujangarh on 12 December 1907, then located in Bikaner State of the Rajputana of British India (now in the Churu district of Rajasthan). he got his first training in music and dance from his father, who was a dhrupad singer and a Kathak dancer in the royal court. In his teens, he joined the royal court of Bikaner as a singer and later moved to the royal court of Nepal. But his destiny landed him in Kolkata and he joined the legendary New Theaters. He was assistant to composer Timir Baran in Devdas (1935 film), and he sang a comedy song 'lo kha lo madam khaanaa' (लो खा लो मॅडम खाना) in Street Singer (1938). He then moved to Mumbai and made his debut as music director in 1939 with Supreme Pictures' films Meri Aankhein and Ghazi Salauddin and was soon signed up by Ranjit Movietone Film Studio.

His initial years with Ranjit Movietone produced significant films like Diwali, Holi, Pardesi, Fariyaad. Khursheed was his leading singer and both of them gave many hits of the early 1940s. His biggest hit with Ranjit Studio was the film Tansen in 1943. Songs like "Diya jalaao jagmag jagmag", "Rumjhum rumjhum chal tihari", "More balpan ke saathi", "Sapt suran teen gram", "Hath sine pe jo rakh do to karara aa jaaye" were big hits. In a radio programme, famous composer Anil Biswas credited Khamchand Prakash for sticking to historical perspective and musical traditions by making K.L. Saigal sing the song 'Sapt Suran Teen Gram' in the Dhrupad style, instead of the Khayal genre, which was done in other films on Tansen, as he knew well that during the life and times of Tansen, the Khayal genre did not exist.

1948 marked yet another significant film of his career, Bombay Talkies’s Ziddi. He gave first major break to Kishore Kumar as a singer for the song "Marne ki duaaen kyun maangu". Ziddi (1948) featured a beautiful song of Lata Mangeshkar Chanda re ja re ja re.

But what followed Ziddi was another hit film Mahal (1949 film). Mahal made Lata Mangeshkar a popular name. Prior to Mahal, the records used to feature only the character name on the record. Hence the first lot of records had "Aayega aane wala" credited to Kamini. The first time when the song was played on All India Radio many letters and calls were received by AIR to know the singer's name. AIR had to, in turn, ask the record company and announce Lata Mangeshkar's name on air.

== Death ==
Khemchand Prakash died at an early age of 42 on 10 August 1950 due to liver Cirrhosis.

Kamal Amrohi, film Mahal's director and story writer, wrote the opening lines of the film song 'Khaamosh hai zamaana..' while Naqshab completed the rest of the song. The first tune that composer Khemchand Prakash played on the harmonium was approved by Kamal Amrohi. Sadly Khemchand died at the Harikisondas Hospital two months before film 'Mahal' released and his creation 'Aayega Aanewala' became a sensation.

Javed Akhtar quoted Khemchand Prakash's name in his maiden speech in Rajya Sabha on 17 May 2012 by mentioning that Khemchand Prakash's second wife Shreedevi had to beg on a railway station to be able to survive in her last days. Shreedevi's daughter (Chandrakala Khemchand Prakash) was also a kathak dancer, she graduated from Bharatiya Kala Kendra, Delhi and was married to film and theatre actor director Ram Gopal Bajaj (Padmashree Awardee and former Director of National School Of Drama, Delhi).

== Partial filmography as composer ==
- 1939 Ghazi Salauddin (young Naushad was his music assistant in this film).
- 1939 Meri Aankhen (Debut film of singer Khursheed Bano)
- 1940 Aaj Ka Hindustan
- 1940 Diwali
- 1940 Holi
- 1940 Pagal
- 1941 Bambai Ki Sair
- 1941 Pardesi
- 1941 Pyaas
- 1941 Shaadi
- 1942 Fariyaad
- 1942 Khilona
- 1942 Maheman
- 1942 Chandni
- 1942 Dukh Sukh
- 1943 Chirag
- 1943 Gauri
- 1943 Kurbani
- 1943 Tansen (Composer Bulo C Rani was his assistant in this film)
- 1944 Bhartrahari
- 1944 Mumtaz Mahal
- 1944 Shahenshah Babar
- 1945 Dhanna Bhagat
- 1945 Prabhu Ka Ghar
- 1947 Samaj Ko Badal Dalo
- 1947 Sindoor
- 1947 Chalte Chalte
- 1947 Gaon
- 1947 Mera Suhaag
- 1948 Aasha
- 1948 Ziddi (Kishore Kumar got his first break in this film)
- 1949 Mahal
- 1949 Rimjhim
- 1949 Sawan Aya Re
- 1950 Jan Pahchan
- 1950 Muqaddar
- 1950 Sati Narmada
- 1951 Jai Shankar
- 1951 Shri Ganesh Janma
- 1952 Tamasha
