= Gunsundari (1948 film) =

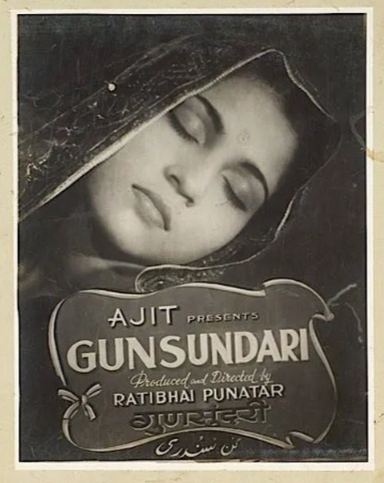
- Poster
- Directed by: Ratibhai Punatar
- Based on: Gunsundari (1934)
- Produced by: Ratibhai Punatar
- Starring: Nirupa Roy; Manhar Desai
- Cinematography: H. S. Kwatra
- Music by: Avinash Vyas (Gujarati); Avinash Vyas, Bulo C Rani, Hansraj Behl (Hindi)
- Production company: Ranjit Movietone/Ajit Pictures
- Release date: 1948
- Running time: 153 minutes
- Country: India
- Language: Gujarati/Hindi

Gunsundari is 1948 Indian Gujarati/Hindi social drama film directed and produced by Ratibhai Punatar. The film was a remake of 1934 film of same name. It was successful.

== Plot ==
Gopaldas Seth has three children. His elder son Chandrakant is married to ideal wife Guniyal. His seven-year-old son Vinu treats Guniyal like his mother. His daughter Kususm is married to Chaman, a poet, and leads a life of poverty. Chandrakant meet a dancer Neelmani through his friend Sudhakar. Neelmani ruins Chandrakant's life and makes him alcoholic. Gopaldas Sheth gives his wealth to Guniyal as inheritance. Guniyal tries to fulfill the monetary demands of Neelmani. Chandrakant eventually has a change of heart during the funeral of his father. He returns to Guniyal.

== Cast ==
The cast is as follows:

- Nirupa Roy as Guniyal
- Manhar Desai as Chandrakant
- Babu Raje as Sudhakar
- Dulari as Kusum
- Saraswati as Neelmani
- Chhagan Romeo
- Master Pransukh as Vinu

== Production ==
Chandulal Shah had directed silent film Gunsundari and its 1934 Hindi remake Gunsundari; both commercial hits. Shah's nephew Ratibhai Punatar was a manager in Ranjit Studios. Punatar was proposed to make a Gujarati remake of Hindi hit by Manhar Desai and Babu Raje to which Shah's wife and lead actress of previous remake Gohar Mamajiwala agreed too. The script was rewritten with some changes retaining the basic plot of previous film and adding variations in 'punchlines'. The film was produced under Ranjit Studios' Gujarati film banner Ajit Pictures. The shooting was completed in 35 days. S. A. Wahab served as an art director.

== Soundtrack ==
The film featured Gujarati as well Hindi soundtracks in their respective versions.

=== Gujarati soundtrack ===
Gunsundari

Soundtrack album by Avinash Vyas
- Released: 1948
- Genre: Feature film soundtrack
- Language: Gujarati
- Label: Saregama

All lyrics are written by Avinash Vyas; all music is composed by Avinash Vyas.

Track listing
| No. | Title | Singer(s) | Length |
|---|---|---|---|
| 1. | "O Bhabhi Tame Thoda Thoda" | Geeta Dutt | 3:16 |
| 2. | "Maru Man Mohyu" | Mohantara Talpade | 2:35 |
| 3. | "O Mazam Raat Ni Tarli" | Geeta Dutt | 3:07 |
| 4. | "Aaj Mari Nandie" | Geeta Dutt | 3:07 |
| 6. | "Rumakjhum Ghunghroo" | Amirbai Karnataki, Chorus | 2:57 |
| 7. | "Bol Ne Mari Sajni" | A. R. Oza, Leela Mehta | 3:22 |
| 8. | "Khovayne Kholva Prabhu" | Geeta Dutt | 3:29 |
| 9. | "Mohabbat Man Tari Dilbar" | Amirbai Karnataki | 2:57 |
| 10. | "Hajar Vaat Kahi" | Amirbai Karnataki, A. R. Oza | 2:51 |
| 11. | "Tari Maherbani Nathi" | Amirbai Karnataki | 3:21 |

=== Hindi soundtrack ===
Gunsundari

Soundtrack album by Avinash Vyas, Bulo C Rani, Hansraj Behl
- Released: 1948
- Genre: Feature film soundtrack
- Language: Hindi
- Label: Saregama

All lyrics are written by Pandit Indra Chandra; all music is composed by Avinash Vyas.

Track listing
| No. | Title | Singer(s) | Length |
|---|---|---|---|
| 1. | "Tumse Muhabbat Kaun Kare" | Amirbai Karnataki | 3:15 |
| 2. | "Shama Jalti Hain" | Amirbai Karnataki | 2:44 |
| 3. | "Rumak Jhum Bichhua Baje" | Amirbai Karnataki, Chorus | 3:01 |
| 4. | "O Sharad Poonam Ki Chandni" | Mohantara Talpade | 3:17 |
| 5. | "Na Lo Angrai Gori" | A.R. Ojha | 3:04 |
| 6. | "Rumakjhum Ghunghroo" | Amirbai Karnataki, Chorus | 2:57 |
| 7. | "Hotel Ka Kinara Ho" | A. R. Oza, Leela Mehta | 3:10 |
| 8. | "Bhabhi O Bhabhi" | Geeta Dutt | 2:45 |
| 9. | "Aana Na Tha Jo Dil Mein" | Amirbai Karnataki, A.R. Ojha | 3:08 |
| 10. | "Khoye Huye Ko Dhundhne Prabhu" | Geeta Dutt | 1:43 |
| 11. | "Nanadiya Maare Boli Ke Baan" | Geeta Dutt | 2:14 |

== Reception ==
The film was commercially successful and celebrated its silver jubilee (25 weeks) in Swastik Cinema in Bombay.

The success of Ranakdevi (1946) and Gunsundari established the Gujarati cinema. Avinash Vyas emerged as a major composer and lyricist of Gujarati cinema. It was a major career success of Nirupa Roy.

== See also ==
- List of Gujarati films
- List of Hindi films of 1948
