= Ghory and Dixit =

Indian comedy duo of Hindi films

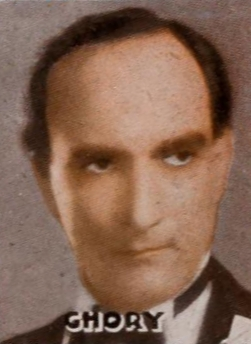
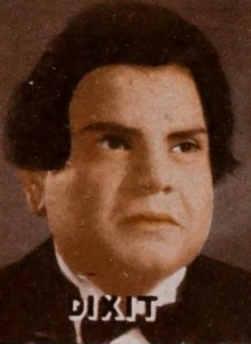
- Ghory and Dixit, promotional shot
- Notable work: Do Badmaash, Sitamgarh, Toofani Toli, Bhola Raja, Rikshawala

Comedy career
- Years active: 1932–1947
- Genres: Slapstick, comedy
- Former members: Nazir Ahmed Ghory; Manohar Janardhan Dixit

Ghory and Dixit were a comedy duo comprising Nazir Ahmed Ghory and Manohar Janardhan Dixit. They were active in Indian cinema during the 1930s and 1940s. They were called the Indian Laurel and Hardy. The duo starred in several films including Do Badmaash, Sitamgarh, Toofani Toli and Bhola Raja. Most of their films were produced by Ranjit Studios. Unlike Laurel and Hardy they played only supporting roles in their films.

== Ghory ==
Ghory was born on 11 August 1901 in Bombay. He started his film acting career with Bhagwati Prasad Mishra-directed Alladin and His Wonderful Lamp and Scented Devil in 1927. Before joining Ranjit Film Company, Ghory had worked with several other production companies. His last Indian film was the 1948 Duniyadaari. After Dixit's death Ghory migrated to Pakistan. He continued acting there and died on 9 December 1977 aged 76. He was buried in Rawalpindi where his daughter was an officer. His son lives in Canada and his daughters live in Karachi. His brother's family left Mumbai (India) but his nephew Ashraf Butt still lives in there.

== Dixit ==
Dixit was born on 12 November 1906 in Sinnar, Nasik district of Maharashtra. He was the eldest child of a district magistrate. He made his debut with the 1930 film His last film was Mahatma which was released in 1953. He died on 29 June 1949 in Mumbai after suffering a severe heart attack aged 42. One of friends Baburao Patel described him as "a 220-pound-bundle of nerves, with a hypochondria-cal mind that constantly imagines various illnesses, not to speak of several imaginary grievances." Dixit entered the film industry as a cameraman's assistant at Navjivan studios. When someone suggested that he would look good as a nawab, he was cast in the 1930 film Sharkling Youth alongside Jairaj and Madhav Kale. After starring in 3 more films – Badmash, Bijli and Vandevi (all released in 1930) he joined Ranjit Film Company. During the principal photography of Puggree in 1947 he suffered a heart attack.

== Works ==
Dixit was obese while Ghory was a lean man and their pair served as a comic element in several of the early talkies. The duo first starred together in the 1932 Jayant Desai-directed talkie Char Chakram. They acted in several other films directed by Desai – Bhola Shikar, Do Badmaash, Bhool Bhulaiyan and Vishivamohini. They continued to act in Ranjit Film's production's till 1947.

== Works cited ==
- Gulazāra; Govind Nihalani; Saibal Chatterjee (2003). Encyclopaedia of Hindi Cinema. Popular Prakashan. ISBN 978-81-7991-066-5.
- Narwekar, Sanjit (2005). Eena Meena Deeka: The Story of Hindi Film Comedy. Rupa & Company. ISBN 978-81-291-0859-3.
- Pednekar, Aparna (21 September 2013). "Bollywood comedy comes of age". Hindustan Times. Archived from the original on 23 September 2013.
- "Lot-pot: Humour In Hindi Cinema". Dearcinema. 10 November 2007. Archived from the original on 11 September 2013.
- "Ghory and Dixit". Cineplot. 6 February 2012. Archived from the original on 20 December 2013.
