= Aaj Ka Hindustan =

1940 Bollywood film directed by Jayant Desai

- Directed by: Jayant Desai
- Starring: Prithviraj Kapoor; Rose; Sitara Devi; Ishwarlal
- Music by: Khemchand Prakash
- Release date: 1940
- Country: British Raj
- Language: Hindi

Aaj Ka Hindustan (transl. Today's India) is a 1940 Bollywood film directed by Jayant Desai and starring Rose, Prithviraj Kapoor, Ishwarlal, Sitara Devi and comedian Charlie. It was produced by Movietone. The film is the story of two brothers – one a nationalist (Prithviraj).
