= Papi (1953 film) =

1953 Indian film

- Directed by: Chandulal Shah
- Written by: Chandulal Shah (dialogues)
- Screenplay by: Chandulal Shah
- Story by: Chandulal Shah
- Produced by: Chandulal Shah
- Starring: Nargis; Raj Kapoor
- Cinematography: Vasant Nagesh Buva
- Edited by: S. G. Chavande
- Music by: S. Mohindar
- Production company: Shree Ranjit Movietone Co.
- Distributed by: Shree Ranjit Movietone Co.
- Release date: 1953
- Country: India
- Language: Hindi

Papi (transl. sinner) is a 1953 Indian Hindi-language film produced under the banner of Shree Ranjit Movietone Co. and directed by Chandulal Shah who also wrote the story, screenplay and dialogues. The film's music was composed by S. Mohindar. It was one of the 17 films starring Nargis and Raj Kapoor together. A contemporary review of Papi by The Times of India hailed their onscreen pairing as "superb". Film writer Ram Awatar Agnihotri records Papi as a box office flop. This was the only film where Kapoor played double role.

== Plot ==
Raju (Raj Kapoor) is an unemployed, extrovert and talkative person who has no qualms in borrowing from others. He is an atheist who does not hold a religious sentiment and even goes to the extent of despising the priests who preaches religious dogmas and even discourages the fellow villagers in listening to their preachings. Such open criticisms of religious sentiments backfires him as the fellow villagers, being illiterate, throws him out as soon he enters somewhere with this agenda as they believe listening to the priest's sermons will bring them solace after death. Being jobless makes him buy perfumes, cigarettes, alcohol etc. from fellow shopkeepers in credit with the promise of paying them later. He also has a habit of gambling and thus, in general, does not possess a good conscience. He likes flowers which he buys from Chameli (Dulari) and enjoys tying them around his wrist, thus making Chameli fall for him and falsely making her assume he loves her too. In actual, he is in love with Lachchhi (Nargis), the village milkmaid and vice versa though she dislikes his petty ways of making a living. With the little money she earns, she secretly pays off all of Raju's debts with the shopkeepers. Lachchhi stays with her blind grandmother in a mortgaged house, who is against Raju marrying Lachchhi unless Raju finds a stable job. With the little money Lachchhi lends to Raju to start a business, Raju buys bangles and with his flirtatious and happy-go-lucky nature, manages to sell off the bangles at a profit. Upon returning back with his newly earned money, Lachchhi is upset as his new business brings him in proximity with women where he touches the hands of maidens and wears the bangles to their hands. An angry Raju asks her to leave him alone as he is against listening to her every small advices.

Meanwhile, Lachchhi owes a debt of Rs. 5,000 to a money lender to whom, her house is mortgaged who, in turn, threatens her of throwing her and her grandmother out if the due is not paid within due date but also offers her of his marriage to her in return, thereby annulling the debt. Since Raju and Lachchhi are in love with each other, Raju makes an attempt in borrowing money from the shopkeepers to help her but none of them has such a huge sum to lend. Chameli, by now aware of Raju's affections for Lachchhi is willing to pay off the debt but on the condition that Raju must marry Chameli instead. A disillusioned Raju thereby decides to rob the gambling owner's vault where he keeps his money. He does manage to steal Rs. 5,000 but then, the owner suddenly wakes up, sees Raju stealing & calling the police. Things go awry when the havildar (P. Kailash) comes after Raju who, in turn, runs to the nearby railway station thereby boarding a then departing train without ticket and gets on to a compartment where he meets his lookalike Swami Satyanand (also Raj Kapoor). Swami Satyanand is a righteous, calm and honest saint who preaches love and spreads the message of morality, righteousness & truth, besides writing books on ethics. While they were conversing, the train meets with a minor accident resulting in the two getting jolted & thereby, falling on the floor. Soon, Raju gains consciousness & finding Swami Satyanand still lying unconscious nearby, takes the opportunity to swap their wardrobes to escape the police.

Now in the disguise of Swami Satyanand, he finds several people waiting to garland him, addressing him as Swamiji, thereby showering him with love & affection as they assume him to be the real Swami. Soon, the devotees take him to a social gathering and requests him to deliver a speech on the principles Swami believe in. Raju starts by stating that he is no mahatma (noble soul) but a papi (sinner) and thereby, does not qualifies to get this respect. However, this statement backfires for Raju as people assume Swamiji being a noble soul who holds no fear in addressing himself as a sinner. Meanwhile, Raju's village gets to know of the train accident including Lachchhi who, in turn, goes to save Raju from police custody. She decides to look for Raju among the wounded people. She comes across Swami Satyanand, lying unconscious in Raju's wardrobe and thereby, mistaking him to be Raju, she brings him home lest he gets caught by the police. Upon gaining consciousness later, Satyanand, having fractured his right arm from the train accident, is grateful to Lachchhi though he is confused of Lachchhi's affections towards him and her calling him Raju aa he has not seen her before. She, in turn, is surprised assuming he had a memory loss and makes desperate attempts to regain his memory but to no avail. She gets frustrated with every passing day and assumes he is putting on this act in order to marry Chameli. Chameli. in turn, believes Lachchhi is sheltering Raju in her house and thereby, calls the police to raid her house. As a consequence, Satyanand ends up being arrested and despite his repeated requests to make them believe he is not Raju, is put behind bars. Meanwhile, at the ashram, Raju starts feeling guilty of fooling innocent people and with his past sins with every passing day, he is angry upon himself that to escape the police, he is impersonating the type of man he himself had always despised. He keeps conversing with his conscience & keeps wondering if God is there, why he, being a sinner, is bestowed with the task of impersonating a saintly person.

One fine day, Lachchhi's grandmother expresses to her, her desire to meet Swami Satyanand after hearing his positive feedback from his followers. Upon visiting his ashram, both are shocked to see Raju in the guise of a saint. Lachchhi's grandmother, being blind, identifies Raju through his voice and thereby, clarifies it from Lachchhi. Raju himself gets shocked upon their sudden encounter there. While they go away without revealing his true identity lest he gets caught, Lachchhi surreptitiously meets Raju at night and confronts him of betraying her love for him while making fool of Satyanand's followers who are unknowingly idolizing him instead of Satyanand. Raju tries to console her by saying this is the life he will be living in the future and he cannot budge away from here. In return, Lachchhi vows to sing laments every night till her laments makes him pierce his soul and feel guilty enough to force him in coming out of the act he is playing on. She even tries in entering at the public gathering, yelling Raju of being a fraudster and that he is not Swami Satyanand but she herself gets thrown out. Raju does start feeling guilty and while he wishes to leave all these chores and reunite with Lachchhi whom he still loves, he does not gather the guts to speak the truth and face the consequences. Soon, the village policeman arrives in the scene where Lachchhi is thrown and immediately recognizes Raju amidst the disguise and instead of arresting him straightaway, he hatches a plan so that Raju himself confesses his truth. The next day, Raju is coaxed by the police in revealing his true self of having fooled the people and is, thereby, arrested. After arriving back to his village, he is locked up in the village prison to complete his term and thereby, come out, as a man of moral character and a good conscience. Before entering the prison, he thanks Swami Satyanand for having bore his place and for indirectly teaching him the path of truth and righteousness, thereby promising to follow the same all his remaining life. Swami Satyanand goes away. Eventually, Raju does complete his prison term and is elevated to find his beloved Lachchhi waiting for him, thereby they are reunited.

== Cast ==
- Raj Kapoor in a dual role as Raju (Rajua) and Swami Satyanand
- Nargis as Lachchhi
- Dulari as Chameli
- P. Kailash as Havildar
- Jagdeep
- Ramesh Thakur
- Maruti
- Amarnath
- Meher Banoo
- Shrawan Kumar
- Romi

== Soundtrack ==
While S. Mohindar provided the music direction, the songs were written by a team of 6 lyricists out of which, only Raja Mehdi Ali Khan and Hasrat Jaipuri were credited in the film whereas the remaining lyricists namely Sarshar Sailani, Butaram Sharma 'Ashk', Rajendra Krishan and Surjit Sethi remained uncredited. The songs were sung by Mohammed Rafi (for Raj Kapoor) and Asha Bhosle (for Nargis) and also there was a brief Hindu devotional verse of just a few lines sung by Manna Dey. The singers too were not credited for their vocals as most films back then didn't credit the playback singers.

Song	Singer(s)	Lyricist
(A brief Hindu devotional verse)	Manna Dey	(Traditional)
"Meri Zindagi Hai Tu Tujhse Meri Justjoo..."	Mohammed Rafi and Asha Bhosle	Surjit Sethi (uncredited)
"Aaja Aa Jaan-e-Bahaar Aaja..."	Asha Bhosle	Hasrat Jaipuri
"Ae Jazbaa-e-Mohabbat Itna Asar Dikha De..."	Asha Bhosle	Hasrat Jaipuri
"Kaun Kahe Unse Jaake Ae Huzoor..."	Asha Bhosle	Sarshar Sailani (uncredited)
"Na Pehlu Mein Dil Hai, Na Moonh Mein Zabaan Hai..."	Asha Bhosle	Butaram Sharma 'Ashk' (uncredited)
"Abhi Abhi Bahaar Thhi..."	Asha Bhosle	Raja Mehdi Ali Khan
"Le Le Gori Pahen Le Chhori..."	Mohammed Rafi	Raja Mehdi Ali Khan
"Tera Kaam Hai Jalna Parwane Chahe Shama Jale Ya Na Jale..."	Mohammed Rafi	Rajendra Krishan (uncredited)

== Trivia ==
- The film's opening credits did not display the names of its lead stars Raj Kapoor and Nargis. Instead, the two actors, Nargis first and Raj Kapoor next, were shown signing their names on blank sheets of paper, their signatures barely legible. Also the signatures of many of the crew members namely cinematographer Vasant Nagesh Buva, music director S. Mohindar, the credited lyricists Raja Mehdi Ali Khan and Hasrat Jaipuri, audiographer H. D. Mistry, art director S. A. Wahab, editor S. G. Chavande & processor A. N. Kapoor were used in the credit section instead of displaying their names in printed form including Chandulal Shah himself, whose signature was used to show that he penned the story, screenplay and dialogues. An upper back shot of Chandulal Shah entering (upto his shoulders) was also taken when the credits rolled to 'Directed by' instead of his name or signature appearing. The names of the remaining crew members appeared in printed form as usual.
- This was the only film where Raj Kapoor appeared in a dual role.
- For the song "Le Le Gori Pahen Le Chhori..." which was picturised on Raj Kapoor showing him as Raju selling bangles, each stanza in this song made a reference to an actress - Nargis in the first stanza, Meena Kumari in the second & Geeta Bali in the last. Nargis, who played the female lead role in this film, did not appear in this song. In the following scene, Raju (Raj Kapoor) personifies the different colored bangles to Lachchhi (Nargis) with the names of the then popular female lead stars of Hindi Cinema namely the blue ones as Nargis (who is standing there playing her character Lachchhi), the yellow ones as Suraiya, the red ones as Madhubala and the green ones as Nutan.
- For the song "Kaun Kahe Unse Jaake Ae Huzoor..." which was picturised on Nargis, the tune of the song was very similar to another Hindi film song released the same year, "Taare Gin Gin Phire Hai Saari Raat..." sung by Lata Mangeshkar from the film Dhoon (1953) also starring Raj Kapoor & Nargis with music direction by Madan Mohan and lyrics for this song penned by Kaif Irfani. It is not known if one inspired the other or if both drew inspiration from another song.
