= Har Har Mahadev (1950 film) =

- Directed by: Jayant Desai
- Written by: Bachubhai Shukla; Pandit Anuj (dialogue)
- Produced by: Jayant Desai
- Starring: Nirupa Roy; Trilok Kapoor
- Cinematography: Sanju Naik
- Music by: Avinash Vyas
- Release date: 1950
- Country: India
- Language: Hindi
- Box office: ₹1.1 crore

Har Har Mahadev (transl. "Hail Mahadev") is a 1950 Indian Hindi-language mythological film directed and produced by Jayant Desai. Spanning 137 minutes in black-and-white, it stands as one of the most successful Indian films of its genre. The film stars Nirupa Roy in her best-known mythological performance, as Uma, alongside Trilok Kapoor who plays Shiva.

A commercial success, Har Har Mahadev earned ₹1.1 crore at the box office and was the fifth highest-grossing Indian film of 1950.

The film's popularity established Roy and Kapoor as a popular screen pairing, and led to them reprising their roles in 18 films. According to the book Icons of Beauty (2010), "Roy's screen image as the beautiful goddess was so pervasive that her fans often approached to ask for her blessing."

== Plot ==
The story revolves around the disruption of cosmic balance caused by the demon king Tarakasur, who conquers the heavens to avenge his mother's humiliation by Indra. Proclaiming himself the ruler of the universe, Tarakasur can only be defeated by a son born to Shiva.

To break Shiva out of his deep, eternal meditation, the gods send Kama, the god of love. However, an enraged Shiva opens his third eye and reduces Kama to ashes. The only path to balancing the cosmos rests on Uma (the daughter of the Himalayas), who undertakes severe, unwavering penance to win Shiva's heart, ultimately leading him to accept her as his consort and restore divine order.

== Cast ==
- Nirupa Roy as Uma
- Trilok Kapoor as Shiva
- Jeevan
- Shanta Kumar
- Kanta Kumari
- Mishra
- Meenakshi
- Niranjan Sharma

== Soundtrack ==
The film's soundtrack was composed by Avinash Vyas, with lyrics penned by Ramesh Sastry and Saraswati Kumar Deepak.
