= Samaj Ko Badal Dalo (1947 film) =

- Directed by: Vijay Bhatt
- Written by: Pandit Girish
- Story by: Pandit Girish
- Produced by: Vijay Bhatt
- Starring: Arun Ahuja; Mridula; Yakub; Leela Pawar
- Cinematography: Yusuf Mulji
- Edited by: Pratap Dave
- Music by: Khemchand Prakash
- Release date: 1947
- Running time: 133 min
- Country: India
- Language: Hindi

Samaj Ko Badal Dalo (Change This World) is a 1947 Indian Hindi social melodrama film directed by Vijay Bhatt. Produced under the Prakash Pictures banner, its music composer was Khemchand Prakash, with lyrics by Pandit Indra, Roopdas, and Qamar Jalalabadi. The story, screenplay and dialogues were by Pandit Girish. Its cinematographer was Yusuf Mulji and the film starred Arun Ahuja, Mridula, Yakub, Leela Pawar, Umakant and Bikram Kapoor.

Bhatt's social film dealt with the issue of "mismatched" marriages and advocated divorce, setting a partner free in order to choose their own mate. Samaj Ko Badal Dalo (1970) is a film of the same name directed by V. Madhusudan Rao and produced by Gemini, however it had no relation to the 1947 film, but was instead a remake of A. Vincent's award-winning Malayalam film, Thulabharam (1968).

== Plot ==
Kishore (Arun) and Manorama (Mridula) are in love, but unable to get married. Mridula's father is a clerk, who can't afford to pay the dowry demanded by Arun's family. Jayant (Yakub) is a widower, and Mridula is married off to him. His cruel behaviour becomes apparent when he starts torturing Mridula soon after their marriage. Arun's parents get him married to the rich Champa (Leela Pawar), who is in love with someone else. Arun helps her marry Naresh, the man she loves, by giving her a divorce. Arun watches the torture inflicted on Mridula and the story then continues through tense scenes where eventually Arun kills Jayant and unwittingly Mridula, too, following which he's sent to a mental asylum having been declared insane.

== Cast ==
- Arun as Kishore
- Mridula Rani as Manorama
- Yakub as Jayant
- Leela Pawar as Champa
- Umakant
- Bikram Kapoor
- Prem Dhawan
- Ramesh Sinha
- Shabnam
- Mohammed Rafi

== Crew ==
The film's crew consisted of:

- Directed: Vijay Bhatt
- Produced: Vijay Bhatt
- Story: Pandit Girish
- Screenplay: Pandit Girish
- Dialogue: Pandit Girish
- Cinematography: Yusuf Mulji
- Choreography: Sachin Shankar, Sharad Shukla
- Editing: Pratap Dave
- Art Direction: M. V. Dubashe, B. M. Shukla
- Audiography: T. K. Dave
- Music: Khemchand Prakash
- Lyrics: Pandit Indra, Roopdas, Qamar Jalalabadi

== Soundtrack ==
Samaj Ko Badal Dalo was one of the early films for which Mohammed Rafi recorded songs in Bombay. The others were Gaon Ki Gori (1945) and Jugnu (1947). The music direction was by Khemchand Prakash, with lyrics by Pandit Indra, Roopdas and Qamar Jalabadi. The playback singers were Mohammed Rafi, Manna Dey, Arun Kumar Ahuja and Amirbai Karnataki.

=== Song list ===
#	Title	Singer	Lyricist
1	"Aye Ji Mat Pucho Kuch Baat"	Mohammed Rafi, Manna Dey, Arun Kumar	Pandit Indra
2	"Dhire Dhire Chale Aao"		Pandit Indra
3	"Tu Kyun Yaad Aata Hai Yaad Aane Wale"		Qamar Jalalabadi
4	"Naina Ro Ro Ke Rah Gaye"	Amirbai Karnataki	Roopdas
5	"Tori Unchi Atariya Pe Aaun Kaise"	Zohrabai Ambalewali	Pandit Indra
6	"Ek Surat Saloni Re Nainon Mein Bas Gayi"		Roopdas
7	"Bikhar Gayi Aasha Ki Badri Bikhar Gayi"	Amirbai Karnataki	Roopdas
