= Achhut =

1940 Hindi Language film

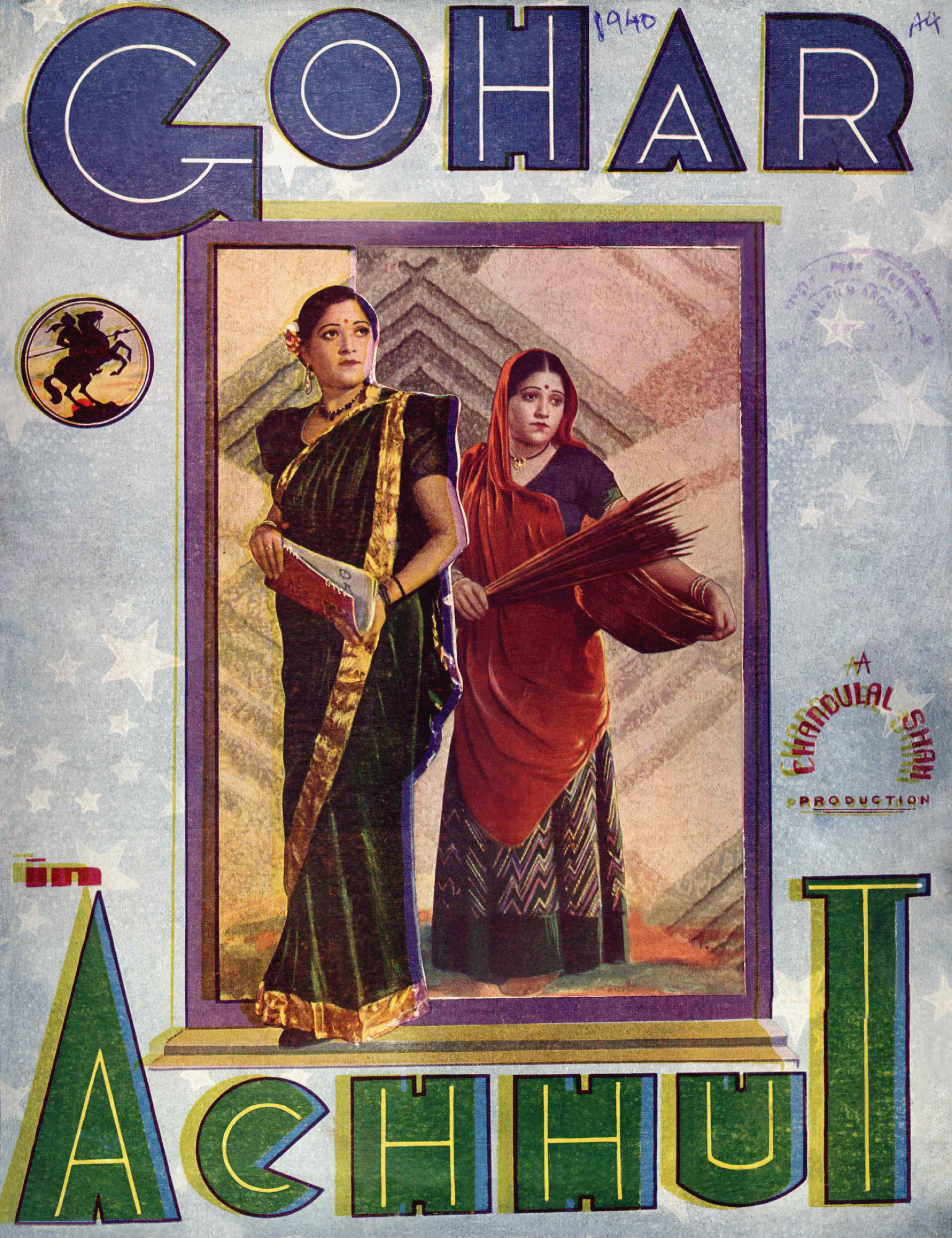
- Cover from film publicity booklet
- Directed by: Chandulal Shah
- Written by: Chandulal Shah
- Starring: Motilal; Gohar Mamajiwala; Sitara Devi; Trilok Kapoor; Noor Mohammed Charlie
- Cinematography: Krishna Gopal
- Music by: Gyan Dutt
- Release date: 5 April 1940
- Running time: 140 minutes
- Country: India
- Language: Hindi
- Box office: ₹40 lakh

Achhut (The Untouchable) is a 1940 social Indian Bollywood film based on untouchability. It was the third highest grossing Indian film of 1940. The film was produced by Chandulal Shah for his Ranjit Studios. He also wrote the story and screenplay, and directed it. Achhut's premiere was attended by Sardar Vallabhbhai Patel on 23 December 1939, who stated: "If the picture helps India to remove this curse, it can be said to have helped India to win Swaraj as untouchability is one of the chief obstacles in the road to freedom".

The film had Motilal and Gohar in the main lead with, Sitara Devi, Trilok Kapoor, Mazhar Khan, Noor Mohammed Charlie, Vasanti and Rajkumari playing important roles. The music was by Gyan Dutt, with lyrics by Raghunath Brahmabhatt. The cinematography was by Krishna Gopal.

The film was made to "promote Gandhi's movement against untouchability". The film was initially released in the Gujarati version on 23 December 1939.

== Plot ==
When Lakshmi (Gohar Mamajiwala), the daughter of a Harijan, fetches water from a temple an infuriated Pujari (priest) breaks the pot on her head. This incident, plus several other injustices that he has faced, forces the father to adopt Christianity into which he brings Lakshmi. The mother refuses to become one and remains a Hindu along with her other child. A rich businessman, Seth Haridas, adopts Lakshmi and she becomes a friend to his daughter, Savitri. Lakshmi gets a good education and the two girls grow up to fall in love with the same man, Madhukar. As Madhukar comes from a high caste family, the Seth, in order to get his daughter married to him informs Madhukar's family of Lakshmi's background. Lakshmi returns to her mother in the village, where she meets Ramu (Motilal), the boy to whom she had been wed as a child. The two get together and rebel against the atrocities against the untouchables (Harijans). The message finally gets through and they are allowed to enter the temple.

== Cast ==
- Gohar Mamajiwala as Lakshmi
- Motilal
- Sitara Devi
- Trilok Kapoor
- Vasanti
- Noor Mohammed Charlie
- Mazhar Khan
- Rajkumari
- Dixit
- Ebrahim
- Lala Yaqoob
- Bhupatrai

== Review ==
Baburao Patel, editor Filmindia, in his review in the January 1940 issue, having seen the Gujarati version stated "The realistic atmosphere, the folklore songs and dances, faithful portrayal of characters, all contribute to make the picture a beautiful poem of instructive screen entertainment". There was praise for the actors, with Gohar giving a'dynamic performance', and Motilal was perfectly cast with his "wonderful restraint of emotions". Sitara Devi, Charlie and Vasanti were also commended for their acting. The reviewer for The Indian Express felt the film was of "all-round excellence and tremendous propaganda value". Gohar's performance was commended with the reviewer calling her the "Queen of Emotions". He further added, "Naturally the subject matter gives ample scope for Gohar's versatility of histrionic gifts and she delights the audience with a wide range of human emotions, from the ecstasy of romance to the poignancy of tragedy." He felt the songs provided a "varied fare", Sitara's folk dance "exceptionally well rendered", "[t]he fire and storm scenes ... realistic" and the "photographic sequences ... delightful".

== Soundtrack ==
The music direction was by Gyan Dutt and the singers were Gohar, Vasanti, Sitara Devi, Popatlal, Kesari, and Khursheed.

=== Songlist ===
#	Title	Singer
1	"Ae Ri Saasu Puchhe Nanand Se"	Kesari, Popatlal
2	"Bansi Banoon Bansidhar Ki"	Vasanti, Kantilal, Sitara Devi
3	"Din Dukhiya Ko Daan Diya"	Vasanti, Gyan Dutt
4	"Door Hato Ji Door Hato Ji"	Gohar
5	"Koi Bajao Na Prem Ki Veena"	Khursheed
6	"Nahin Bolun Nahin Bolun Lakh Manaye Krishna Kanhaiya"	Gohar, Gyan Dutt
7	"Raghupati Raja Raghav Ram"	Gohar, Vasanti
8	"Re Panchhi Samay Ko Pehchan Lena Tu"	Gohar
9	"Soja Soja Ri Kahe Tore Bairan Nindiya"	Gohar, Vasanti
10	"Suno Suno Mere Bhagwan"	Vasanti
