= Ziddi (1948 film) =

1948 film

- Directed by: Shaheed Latif
- Written by: Ismat Chughtai
- Produced by: Bombay Talkies
- Starring: Dev Anand; Kamini Kaushal; Pran
- Cinematography: Josef Wirsching
- Music by: Khemchand Prakash
- Release date: 1948
- Country: India
- Language: Hindi

Ziddi (transl. Stubborn) is a 1948 Bollywood film directed by Shaheed Latif. It was based on a story written by Ismat Chughtai. The film helped establish actors Dev Anand, Kamini Kaushal and Pran in Hindi films.

The playback singers Kishore Kumar and Lata Mangeshkar recorded their first duet "Yeh Kaun Aaya Re" together in Ziddi. Apparently Kishore Kumar also had a role of Gardener in the movie. Also a famous incident took place which was in a scene Kishore Kumar had to taunt Dev Anand but in the scene when first shot, he cussed at him and Ashok Kumar was shocked to see what had happened.

== Cast ==
- Dev Anand as Puran
- Kamini Kaushal as Asha
- Pran
- Kishore Kumar as Gardener
- Nawab
- Kuldeep Kaur as Shanta
- Chandabai

== Music ==
Ziddi

Soundtrack album by Khemchand Prakash
- Released: 1948
- Genre: Feature film soundtrack Indian classical music

The music of the film was composed by Khemchand Prakash.

The soundtrack featured the first film song sung by singer Kishore Kumar, "Marne Ki Duaen Kyon Mangun", a solo picturised on Dev Anand. The film also included Lata Mangeshkar's solo, "Chanda Re Ja Re Ja, Piya Se Sandesa Mora Kahiyo Ja", picturised on Kamini Kaushal.

Song	Singer
"Marne Ki Duaen Kyon Maangun"	Kishore Kumar
"Yeh Kaun Aaya Re, Karke Yeh Sola Singar"	Kishore Kumar, Lata Mangeshkar
"Ab Kaun Sahara Hai"	Lata Mangeshkar
"Chanda Re, Ja Re Ja"	Lata Mangeshkar
"Rooth Gaye More Shyam"	Lata Mangeshkar
"Zindagi Ka Aasra Samjhe"	Lata Mangeshkar
"Jadu Kar Gaye Kisike Naina"	Lata Mangeshkar
"Ek Baat Kahun Tumse"	Shamshad Begum
"Chali Pi Ko Milan Ban Than Ke"	Shamshad Begum
