= Ishwarlal =

Bollywood Hindi actor, director and pruducer

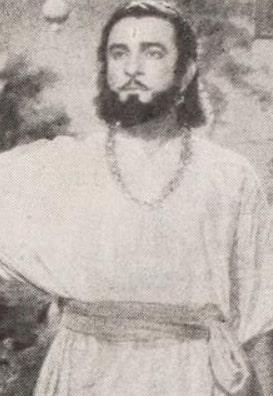
- Ishwarlal in the film Subhadra
- Born: Hariprashad Joshi; 9 October 1911; Waghania, Bombay Presidency, India
- Died: 22 January 1969 (aged 57); Bombay, Maharashtra, India
- Occupations: Actor, director, producer
- Years active: 1930 — 1966

Ishwarlal was a Bollywood Hindi actor, director and producer, active from 1930 to 1966. He was born 9 October 1911 at Waghania, Bombay Presidency, British India as Hariprashad Joshi. He died on 22 January 1969 in Bombay (Mumbai), India aged 57. He acted in 86 films, directed 11 and sang in 14.

== As actor ==
- 1973 Kahani Kismat Ki
- 1963 Meri Surat Teri Ankhen
- 1963 Jevi Chhun Tevi
- 1963 Lakho Vanzaro
  - Satyawan Savitri
- 1962 Aalha Udal
  - Baghdad Ki Raaten
  - Bezubaan
  - Janam Janamna Sathi
- 1961 Chundali Chokha
  - Hiro Salat
- 1959 Paigham
- 1958 Gopichand
- 1953 Shuk Rambha
  - Naulakha haar
- 1952 Indrasen
  - Mr. Sampat
- 1951 Jai Shankar
  - Samsaram (Tamil)
- 1950 Sati Narmada
  - Bhagwan Shri Krishna
- 1949 Matribhoomi
  - Nar Narayan
- 1947 Rivaj
- 1946 Sohni Mahiwal
  - Subhadra
  - Maharana Pratap
- 1945 Badi Maa
  - Sharbati Aankhen
  - Samrat Chandragupta
- 1944 Manorama
  - Lalkar
  - Across The River
  - Dil Ki Baat
  - Uss Paar
- 1943 Kurbani
  - Zaban
  - Bansari
- 1942 Maheman
  - Chandni
  - Dhiraj
  - Fariyaad
- 1941 Shaadi
  - Ummeed
  - Pyaas
- 1940 Diwali
  - Holi
  - Aaj Ka Hindustan
  - Musafir
- 1939 Meri Ankhen
  - Adhuri Kahani
  - Thokar
  - Ghazi Salahuddin
- 1938 Ban Ki Chidiya
  - Billi
- 1937 Toofani Toli
  - Mitti Ka Putla
  - Shana Parwana
  - Sharafi Loot
  - Zameen Ka Chand
  - Pardesi Pankhi
  - Dil Faroshii
- 1936 Rangila Raja
  - Laheri Lala
  - Jwalamukhi
  - Chalak Chor
  - Raj Ramani
  - Sipahi Ki Sajani
  - Struggle
  - Dil Ka Dakoo
  - Matlabi Duniya
  - Prabhu Ka Pyara
- 1935 Barrister's Wife
  - Raat Ki Rani
  - Desh Daasi
  - Bombshell
  - College Girl
  - Noor-e-Vatan
  - Qeemti Ansoo
- 1934 Toofani Taruni
  - Veer Babruvahan
  - Sitamgarh
  - Tara Sundari
  - Nadira
  - Toofan Mail
- 1933 Bhola Shikar
- 1932 Bhutia Mahaal
  - Sipah Salan
  - Lal Swar
  - Chaar Chakram
- 1931 Ghunghatwali
  - Banke Sawaria
  - Katil Katari
  - Mojili Mashuk
  - Premi Jogan
- 1930 Jobanna Jadu
  - Ranak Devi
  - Romances of Radha
  - Sheikh Chilli
