= Pyar Ki Baten =

1951 Indian Hindi-language film

- Directed by: Akhtar Hussein
- Starring: Nargis; Trilok Kapoor
- Production company: Nargis Art
- Release date: 1951
- Country: India
- Language: Hindi

Pyar Ki Baten is a 1951 Indian Hindi-language film directed by Akhtar Hussein. The film was produced under the banner of Nargis Art Company, and starred Nargis, Trilok Kapoor, and Pran.

== Plot ==
Prince Badar (Trilok Kapoor) of Aleppo, a carefree young man, proposes marriage to Princess Nadira (Nargis) of a neighboring country. Nadira cruelly rejects his proposal and sends him a doll instead. Enraged by the humiliation, Badar vows to make her his servant and sets out in the disguise of a poor peasant to seek revenge.

Meanwhile, Gulnar, the stepmother of Nadira, tries to force Nadira into marrying her cousin. To escape this, Nadira flees with the help of Saki (Pran), the army chief. While staying at an inn during their flight, Saki proposes marriage to Nadira. Coincidentally, Badar is working in disguise at that same inn. He steps in to save Nadira from Saki and brings her back toward her palace.

Saki later kidnaps Nadira. The rest of the film tracks Badar's journey to rescue her from danger, leading them to eventually fall in love.

== Cast ==
- Nargis as Nadira
- Trilok Kapoor as Badar
- Pran as Saki
- Cuckoo Moray
- Anwar Hussain
- Marutirao Parab

== Release and review ==
Pyar Ki Baten premiered in Bombay on 8 February 1952.

The Times of India reviewed the film on 18 May 1952.
