= Aaj Ki Duniya =

1940 Bollywood film directed by G.P. Pawar

- Directed by: G.P. Pawar
- Starring: Ashalata; Trilok Kapoor; Jeevan
- Music by: Pratap Mukerji
- Release date: 1940
- Country: British Raj
- Language: Hindi

Aaj Ki Duniya is a 1940 Bollywood film directed by G.P. Pawar. Starring Ashalata, Trilok Kapoor, Jeevan, S. Nazir, and Vatsala Kumtekar, the film premiered in Bombay on 1 January 1940.

== Cast ==
- Nazir
- Ashalata
- Trilok Kapoor
- Vatsala Kumtekar
- Gulab
- Jeevan
