= Mahasati Ansuya =

- Directed by: V.M. Vyas
- Written by: Mohanlal G. Dave
- Starring: Durga Khote; Shobhna Samarth; Shahu Modak
- Release date: 1943
- Country: India
- Language: Hindi

Mahasati Ansuya is a Bollywood film. It was released in 1943.
