= Dhandora =

- Starring: Noor Mohammad Charlie, Husn Banu
- Release date: 1941
- Country: India
- Language: Hindi

Dhandora is a Bollywood film. It was released in 1941. It starred Noor Mohammad Charlie.
