= Shaadi (1941 film) =

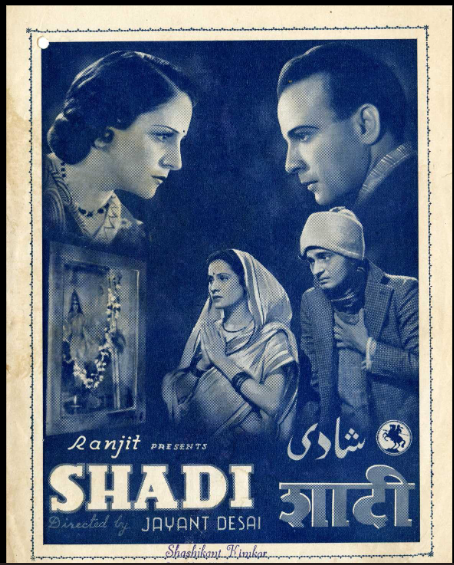
- Official poster
- Directed by: Jayant Desai
- Production company: Ranjit Studios
- Release date: 1941
- Country: India
- Language: Hindi

Shaadi is a Hindi language film starring Madhuri, Motilal and Ishwarlal. It was released in 1941.

== Remake ==
The film was remade in the 1949 Gujarat film Mangalfera directed by Ratibhai Punatar under banner of Ajit Pictures.
