= Bhaktaraj =

- Directed by: Jayant Desai
- Produced by: Jayant Desai Productions
- Starring: Dixit; Kaushalya; Vasanti; E. Billimoria
- Release date: 1943
- Country: India
- Language: Hindi

Bhaktaraj is a Bollywood film. It was released in 1943. The film was produced by "Jayant Desai Productions" and directed by Jayant Desai. The cast included Vasanti, Vishnupant Pagnis, E. Billimoria, Kaushalya and Dixit.

== Cast ==
- Vishnupant Pagnis
- Vasanti
- Mubarak
- Kaushalya
- Dixit
- E. Bilimoria
- Bhagwandas

== Soundtrack ==
The film's music was composed by C. Ramchandra, with the lyrics written by D. N. Madhok. The singers were Vasant, Vishnupant Pagnis, Kaushalya, Amirbai Karnataki, Kantilal and Rajkumari.

=== Songs ===
#	Title	Singer(s)
1	"Jaag Musafir Chal De Aage"	
2	"Mat Kar Tu Abhimaan"	Vasanti, Vishnupant Pagnis
3	"Prabhu Ji Mere Aao"	Vishnupant Pagnis
4	"Prabhu Aaye Tere Dwaar"	Kaushalya, Kanti Lal, Vishnupant Pagnis
5	"Bahaar Aayi Hai"	Amirbai Karnataki
6	"Bolo Bolo Re Prabhu Ji"	Vasanti
7	"Kahaan Kaala Kaala Main Tera Matwala"	Vasanti
8	"Kaisa Sundar Sama Suhana"	Vasanti
9	"Jo Hum Bhale Bure Toh Tere"	Kaushalya, Vishnupant Pagnis
10	"Mere Naina Tujhe Dhundhe Hai Sawariya"	Kaushalya
11	"More Raja Ji Ho More Raja Ji"	Rajkumari
