= Krishna Bhakta Bodana =

- Directed by: J. B. H. Wadia
- Produced by: Wadia Movietone
- Starring: Sheikh Mukhtar; Meera; Gope; Ranjit Kumari
- Music by: Avinash Vyas; Shankar Rao Vyas
- Release date: 1944
- Country: India
- Language: Hindi

Krishna Bhakta Bodana is a Bollywood film. It was released in 1944.
