= Trilok Kapoor =

Indian film actor (1912–1988)

- Born: 11 February 1912; Kapoor Haveli, Peshawar, North-West Frontier Province, British India (Present-day Khyber Pakhtunkhwa, Pakistan)
- Died: 23 September 1988 (aged 76); Bombay, Maharashtra, India
- Occupation: Actor
- Years active: 1933–1988
- Children: 2
- Family: Kapoor family

Trilok Kapoor (11 February 1912 – 23 September 1988) was an Indian actor and a member of the Kapoor family who worked in Bollywood films. He was the younger brother of actor Prithviraj Kapoor.

== Early and personal life ==
Born in the Kapoor Haveli in Peshawar, he moved to Calcutta and then to Mumbai. His bungalow in Union Park, Chembur, is one of the last remaining bungalows in the area, now renamed Trilok Kapoor Marg. Trilok was born as the second son of Dewan Basheshwarnath Kapoor in a Punjabi family. Like his brother Prithviraj Kapoor he entered the budding Hindi film industry (Bollywood) in the 1930s and was one of the most commercially successful actors of the era.

Kapoor had two sons. Vicky Kapoor was a lawyer and politician and Vijay Kapoor was a film director. ^{[2]}

== Career ==
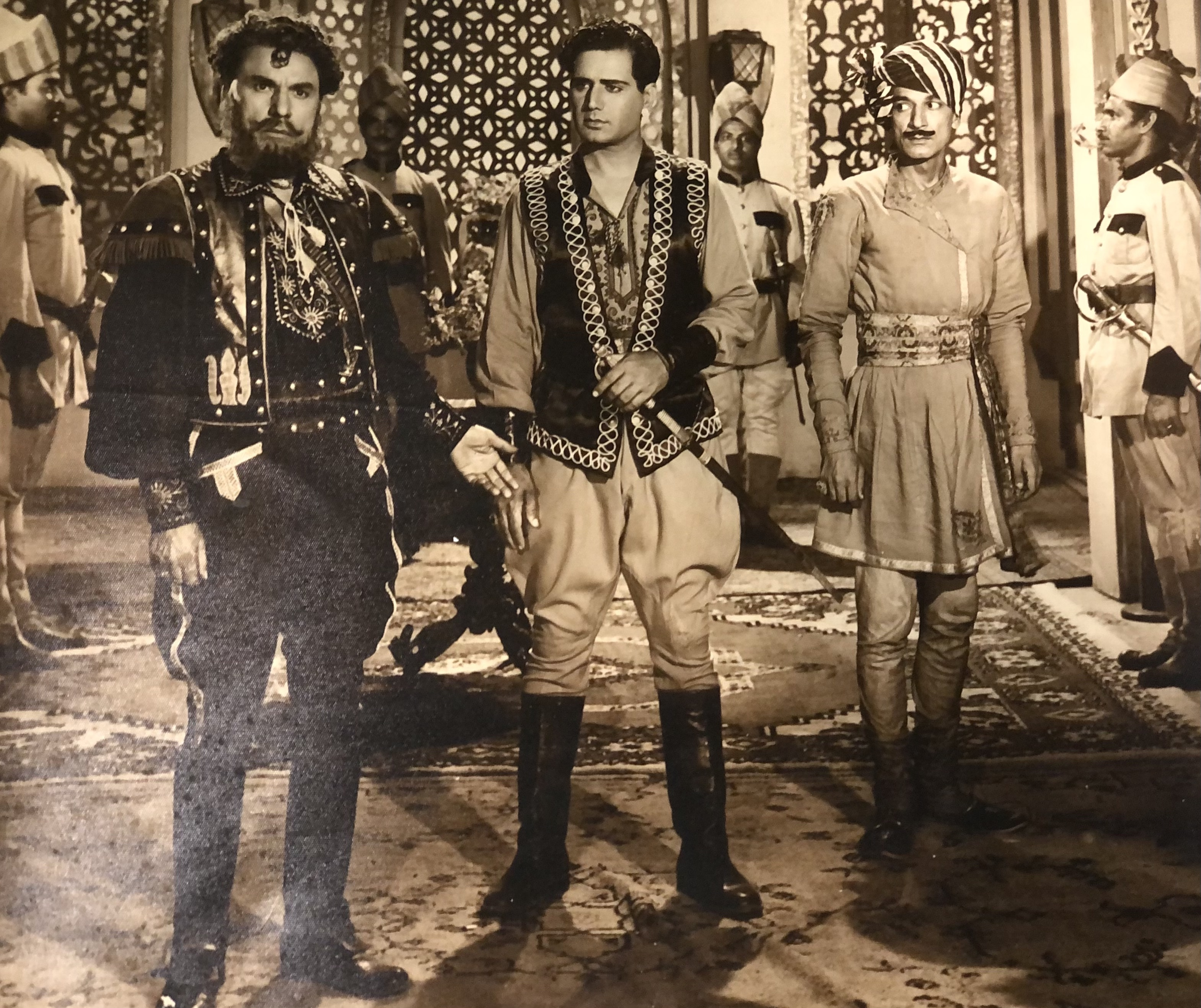
Kapoor on set in the late 1930s

His first role was the lead in the blockbuster Char Darvesh (1933) opposite Kanan Devi. He played the role of Luv in the 1933 classic hit Seeta directed by Debaki Bose. The film also starred Prithviraj Kapoor as Rama, Gul Hamid as Laxman, and Durga Khote as Sita.

Trilok Kapoor became a prominent lead actor of the 1930s and 1940s and was one of the highest paid film star for several years.

He acted as hero opposite Noor Jehan in the superhit film Mirza Sahiban, her last film in India in 1947 before Noor Jehan moved to Pakistan. He was often paired as hero opposite leading actresses of the era such as Nalini Jaywant, Sushila Rani Patel, Meena Shorey, Sulochana and others. He was paired with Nargis in the superhit movie Pyar Ki Baten.

Later he transitioned to mythological films. He played the role of Rama in Homi Wadia’s 1948 film Shri Ram Bhakta Hanuman and Shiva in Vijay Bhatt's 1954 epic Ramayan. He played many roles in mythological films, and appeared in eighteen movies alongside Nirupa Roy, usually portraying Shiva while she played Parvati. As a pair, their popularity erupted after the 1950 movie Har Har Mahadev which was the fifth highest-grossing film of the year. He starred in the 1955 film Ekadashi as a hero opposite Mala Sinha. He was the lead in Nanabhai Bhatt’s blockbuster film Ram Janma (1951). He played the role of lord Vishnu in the superhit 1955 film Waman Avtar with Nirupa Roy and Shahu Modak which had the hit song Tere Dwar Khada Bhagwan penned by Kavi Pradeep. Devotional songs from his films are very popular till date like “Bholenath se Nirala (Har Har Mahadev), Tere Dwar Khada Bhagwan” (Waman Avtar), and “Pinjare ka panchi” (Naag Mani).

He also produced a movie Shiv Parvati under his banner TK Films in 1962 in which he played the role of Shiva opposite Ragini who played Parvati and Jeevan who played the role of Narad Muni.

Later he switched to playing character roles through the 1970s until his death in 1988. His notable films were Kachche Dhaage, Chor Chor, Darwaza, Saboot, Purana Mandir, Ram Teri Ganga Maili among others. His last film was the 1988 telefilm Akaanksha directed by his son Vijay Kapoor.

== Filmography ==
Year	Film	Character/Role
1990	Wafaa	Radhika's Father
1989	Akanksha (TV Movie) (as Late Trilok Kapoor)	
1989	Saaya	Judge (Uncredited)
1988	Mera Shikar	Mukhiya
1988	Gangaa Jamunaa Saraswathi	Thakur Chicha Prasad 'Chichaji' - Ganga's dad (uncredited)
1987	Dozakh	
1986	Tahkhana	Raghuvir Singh
1986	Allah-Rakha	Judge #1 (Uncredited)
1986	Shart	
1985	Ram Teri Ganga Maili	Professor
1984	Meraa Dost Meraa Dushman	Bahadur Singh
1984	Purana Mandir	Raja Hariman Singh
1984	Laila	
1984	Aasmaan	
1982	Badle Ki Aag	General Shamsher Singh (Uncredited)
1982	Ustadi Ustad Se	Police Inspector
1980	Dostana	Mr. Sahni
1980	Saboot	Dharamdas
1980	Do Premee	Gurudev
1980	Toote Dil	
1979	Raja Harishchandra	
1979	Ahinsa	
1979	Sargam	Dinu Chacha
1978	Ganga Sagar	
1978	Main Tulsi Tere Aangan Ki	
1978	Darwaza	
1977	Farishta Ya Qatil	
1976	Nehle Pe Dehla	Suprident of Police
1976	Kabeela	Santan
1976	Sawa Lakh Se Ek Ladaun	
1975	Jaan Hazir Hai	
1975	Prem Kahani	Brijesh K. Narain
1975	Toofan	
1975	Jai Santoshi Maa	
1975	Mahapavan Teerth Yatra	
1975	Mere Sartaj	Thakur Kaka
1974	Ishq Ishq Ishq	Col. S. K. Kumar
1974	Chor Chor	
1973	Shareef Budmaash	
1973	Saudagar	
1973	Kuchhe Dhaage	Subedar
1972	Do Chor	Police Commissioner
1972	Raaste Kaa Patthar	
1971	Brahma Vishnu Mahesh	Shiva
1970	Bhagwan Parshuram	
1962	Shiv Parvati	Shiva
1960	Bhakt Raj	Bhagwan Shri Ram (uncredited)
1959	Sati Vaishalini	
1958	Gauri Shankar	
1957	Bhakta Dhruva	
1957	Naag Mani	
1957	Shesh Naag	
1956	Harihar Bhakti	
1956	Indra Leela	
1955	Ekadashi	
1955	Ganga Maiyya	
1955	Waman Avtar	Bhagwan Vishnu
1955	Jai Mahadev	
1954	Chakradhari	
1954	Durga Puja	
1954	Rajyogi Bharthari	
1954	Shiv Ratri	
1954	Watan	
1954	Shiv Kanya	
1953	Anand Bhawan	
1953	Rami Dhoban	
1952	Rajrani Damayanti	
1952	Shiv Shakti	
1952	Vasna	
1952	Veer Arjun	
1951	Dasavtaar	
1951	Ishwar Bhakti	
1951	Maya Machhindra	
1951	Pyar Ki Baten	Prince Badar
1951	Ram Janma	
1951	Shri Ganesh Janma	
1951	Shri Vishnu Bhagwan	
1950	Alakh Niranjan	
1950	Har Har Mahadev	Shiva
1950	Veer Bhimsen	
1949	Ek Teri Nishani	
1948	Dukhiyari	
1948	Gunjan	
1948	Ram Bhakta Hanuman	Bhagwan Shri Ram
1947	Mirza Sahiban (1947 film)	
1947	Toote Dil	
1946	Amar Raj	Kamal
1946	Dharti	Kishen
1946	Gwalan	
1946	Jeevan Swapna	
1945	Ali Baba	
1945	Prabhu Ka Ghar	Arvind
1945	Shri Krishn Arjun Yuddha	
1944	Aaina	
1943	Aankh Ki Sharm	
1943	Badalti Duniya	
1943	Koshish	
1943	Rahgeer	
1943	Vakil Saheb	
1943	Vishwas	
1942	Nari	
1942	Raja Rani	Raja
1941	Shahzadi	
1941	Tulsi (as Trilok)	
1940	Aaj Ki Duniya	
1940	Achhut	
1940	Anuradha	
1940	Geeta	Kumar
1940	Jhuthi Sharm	
1940	Pagal	
1939	Meri Aankhen	
1938	Abhagin	
1938	Baazigar	
1938	Gorakh Aya	
1938	Secretary	
1937	Anath Ashram	Kailash
1936/I	Karodpati	
1935	Dhoop Chhaon	Satyavan
1935	Wamaq Azra	
1934	Dakshayajna	
1934	Seeta	
1933	Char Darvesh	
