= Gohar Mamajiwala =

Indian singer, actress and producer (1910–1985)

Gohar Khayyam Mamajiwala
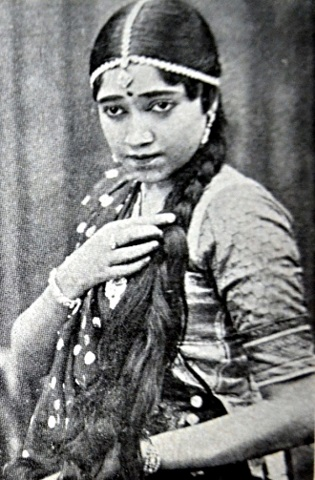
- Born: Gohar Khayyam Mamajiwala; 19 November 1910; Lahore, Punjab, British India
- Died: 28 September 1985 (aged 74); Bombay, Maharashtra, India
- Occupation: Actress
- Years active: 1926–1970's
- Partner: Chandulal Shah

Gohar Khayyam Mamajiwala (19 November 1910 – 28 September 1985), also known as Miss Gohar, was an Indian singer, actress, producer and studio co-owner of Ranjit Studios.

== Early life ==
Gohar was born on 19 November 1910 into a Dawoodi Bohra family in Lahore, Punjab, British India. Gohar's father's business almost collapsed and the family funds were seriously depleting when a family friend, Homi Master, working at the time as a director for Kohinoor Films, suggested that Gohar take up acting as a career. Her parents agreed.

== Career ==
Gohar started her career at the age of sixteen with the film Baap Kamai/Fortune and the Fools (1926), directed by Kanjibhai Rathod. The role of the hero was portrayed by Khalil and the film was produced by Kohinoor Films. The film was a hit. Gohar, along with Jagdish Pasta, Chandulal Shah, Raja Sandow and cameraman Pandurang Naik started Shree Sound Studios. In 1929, along with Chandulal Shah, she founded Ranjit Studios, which was later known as Ranjit Movietone.

== Later life and death ==
She retired in the 1970s and died in Bombay, Maharashtra on 28 September 1985.

== Filmography ==
- Fortune and the Fools (Baap Kamai) (1925)
- Fairy of Ceylon (1925)
- Ghar Jamai (1925)
- Lanka Ni Laadi (1925)
- Briefless Barrister (1926)
- Lakho Vanjaro (1926)
- Mena Kumari (1926)
- Mumtaz Mahal (1926)
- Prithvi Putra (1926)
- Ra Kawat (1926)
- Samrat Shiladitya (1926)
- Sati Jasama (1926)
- Shrin Farhad (1926)
- Thief Of Delhi (1926)
- Typist Girl (1926)
- Educated Wife (1927)
- Gunsundari (1927)
- Sati Madri (1927)
- Sumari Of Sind (1927)
- Grihalaxmi (1928)
- Puran Bhagat (1928)
- Vishwamohini (1928)
- Beggar Girl (1929)
- Chandramukhi (1929)
- Gulshan-E-Arab (1929)
- Magic Flute (1929)
- Pati Patni (1929)
- Punjab Mail (1929)
- Rajputani (1929)
- Shirin Khusru (1929)
- My Darling (1930)
- Raj Laxmi (1930)
- The Conqueror (1930)
- Wild Flower (1930)
- Devi Devyani (1931)
- Radha Rani (1932)
- Sati Savitri (1932)
- Sheil Bala (1932)
- Miss (1933)
- Vishwa Mohini (1933)
- Gunsundari (1934)
- Tara Sundari (1934)
- Toofani Taruni (1934)
- Barrister's Wife (1935)
- Desh Dasi (1935)
- Kimiti Ansoo (1935)
- Derby Ka Shikar (1936)
- Gunehgar (1936)
- Prabhu Ka Pyara (1936)
- Raj Ramani (1936)
- Sipahi Ki Sajni (1936)
- Pardesi Pankhi (1937)
- Achhut (1940)
- Usha Haran (1940)

[Note:- Due to several Gohars working in the Hindi film industry, the possibility of errors in filmography can't be ruled out.]
