= Gunsundari (1927 film) =

- Directed by: Chandulal Shah
- Written by: Chandulal Shah
- Starring: Gohar; P. K. Raja Sandow
- Cinematography: Narayan G. Devare
- Production company: Kohinoor Film Company
- Distributed by: Dayaram Shah
- Release date: 1927
- Country: India
- Language: Silent

Gunsundari (English: Why do Husbands Go Astray?) is 1927 Indian silent social drama film written and directed by Chandulal Shah. The film was commercially successful and was remade twice later.

== Plot ==
Gunsundari is a devoted wife to his husband who is not involved in his domestic responsibilities and claims that he is busy in his office work. He dislikes his wife due to her moral stand and gets involved with a dancing girl. The wife goes beyond her home and discovers a new world as well as meets a social outcast person like her. The story ends there.

== Cast ==
The cast is as follows:

- Gohar as Gunsundari
- P. K. Raja Sandow
- Rampiyari
- Jamna
- R. N. Vaidya

== Production ==
Chandulal Shah wrote and directed the film when the cinema was dominated by mythological films. It was produced in 22 days. It told the modern women that their husband should be more participating in their domestic responsibilities and they should be more exploring of the world beyond their homes. The black and white film was 9452 feet long.

== Legacy and remakes ==
Gunsundari is Shah's most known film. Gohar subsequently played similar signature roles in her career. The film was such a success in its first appearance in 1927, that director Chandulal Shah remade it in 1934 under Ranjit Studios starring Gohar. It was remade again in 1948 under Ajit Pictures and directed by Shah's nephew Ratilal Punatar and starred Nirupa Roy. However, these three versions include some changes to reflect their times.
