= Chandrahasa =

Mythological Hindu king

- King of Kuntala
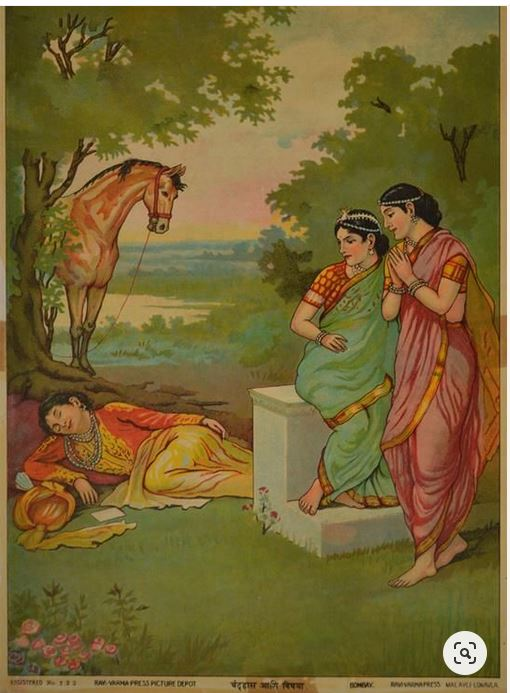
- Vishaya comes across a sleeping Chandrahasa
- Symbol: Shaligrama
- Texts: Mahabharata
- Region: Karnataka
- Consorts: Vishaya and Champakamalini
- Offspring: Padmaksha and Makaraksha

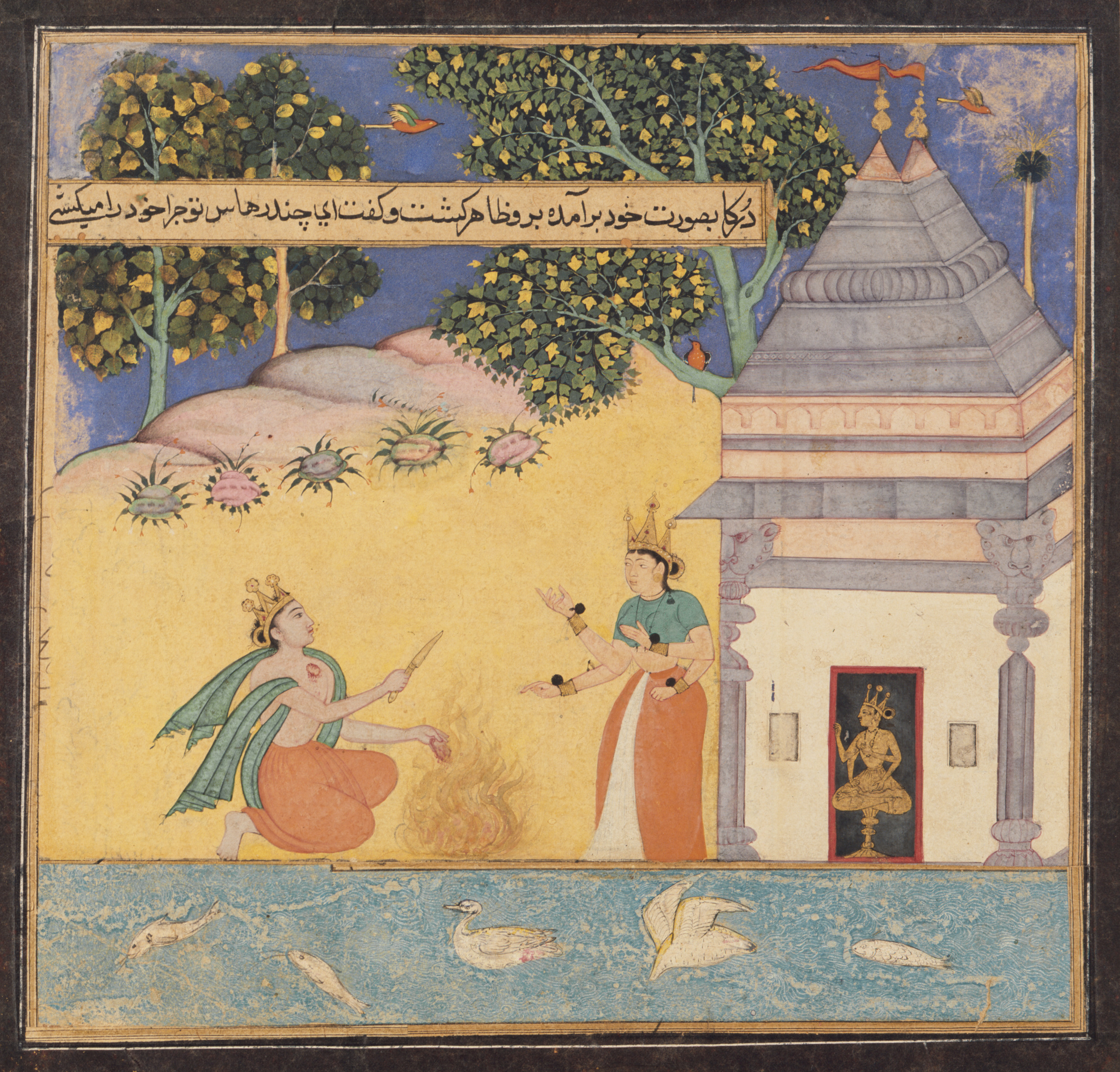
Chandrahasa prays to goddess Kali.

Chandrahasa (Sanskrit: चन्द्रहास, lit. 'laughter of the moon') is a king of the Kuntala kingdom in Hindu mythology. The story of Chandrahasa is described in the Ashvamedhika Parva of the epic Mahabharata. Chandrahasa befriends Arjuna who was accompanied by Krishna guarding the ashvamedha ceremony of Yudhishthira. Chandrahasa anoints his son Makaraksha as the king and accompanies the army of Arjuna to help the ashvamedha.

The story of Chandrahasa is also depicted in the Kannada epic Jaimini Bharatha of the poet Lakshmeesha. The popular story of the prince Chandrahasa is also played in popular films and in Yakshagana theatre.

== Legend ==
=== Childhood ===
Prince Chandrahasa was born to a raja of Kerala, bearing six toes in his left foot, an inauspicious sign. The raja was slain in battle, and his queen followed him in the funeral pyre, leaving their son destitute. The child's maid fled with him to the kingdom of Kuntala, but passed away three years later without having revealed the identity of the prince. Chandrahasa grew to fend for himself, finding a shaligrama, a sacred marble of Vishnu, that served as his talisman.

One day, Dushtabuddhi (the wicked-minded one), the minister of the king of Kuntala, was performing the annasantarpaṇa, the ceremony of feeding the people. The priests who had gathered there noticed the royal features of Chandrahasa and told the minister to take special care of the boy. But Dushtabuddhi, who had evil designs, wished to usurp the throne, and hence sought to dispose of the boy. He hired some mercenaries for this purpose, who took the boy captive in the jungle and prepared to kill him. Unable to perform the dirty deed, they slice off his sixth toe and showed it to Dushtabuddhi as evidence of Chandrahasa's death. Kalinda, a vassal of Kuntala, saw the child wandering and crying in the jungle. As he had no children of his own, he brought him home and raised him as his own son, naming him as Chandrahasa, since his faced radiated like the moon whenever he laughed. Chandrahasa learnt all the aspects of a princely education and was designated as his foster-father's heir. Dustabuddhi visited Chandanavati, the kingdom of Kalinda, and caught sight of Chandrahasa, realising that he had been deceived. He wrote a letter to his son Madana, asking Chandrahasa to be his messenger.

=== Coronation ===
Chandrahasa travelled to the Kuntala kingdom and was resting in the garden in the outskirts of the town. Vishaya, daughter of Dushtabuddhi, who had also come there with her maids chanced upon a sleeping Chandrahasa and was attracted to his comeliness. She opened the letter addressed to her brother and recognised it as her father's note. The letter addressed to Madana ordered him neither to care for the rank nor the youth of the messenger, and to give him visha (poison). Vishaya, entranced by the youth, decided that her father, in his haste, had meant to write Vishaya instead, adding the last characters to the letter using her cosmetic and a stalk.

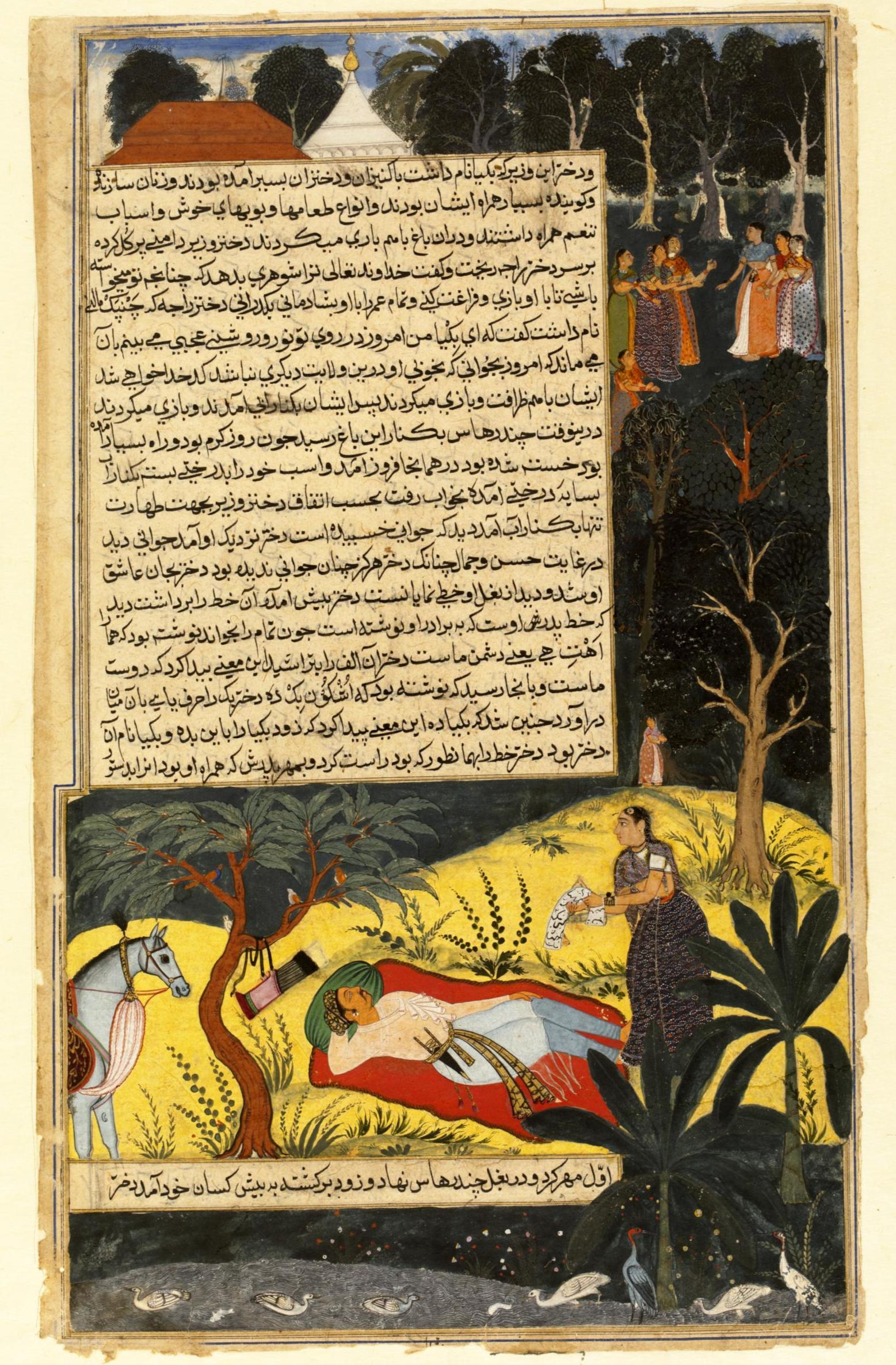
Vishaya changes the letter, folio of Razmnama.

Chandrahasa delivered the note to Madana, Dushtabuddhi's son, who honoured his father's command that very evening, wedding the prince to his beautiful sister.

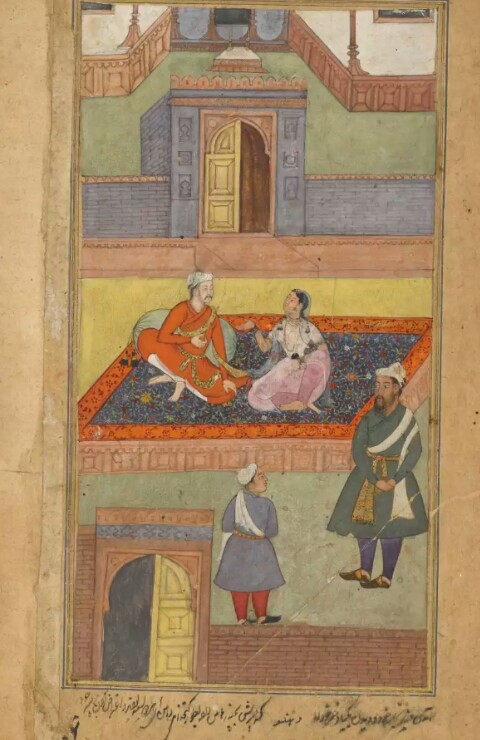
Madana tell Dushtabuddhi about Vishaya's marriage with Chandrahasa, made by Dhanu . folio of Razmnama.

Dustabuddhi returned to Kuntala to great fanfare, and swiftly realised what had transpired, wondering if he had truly committed such a blunder. He hatched another assassination plot, requesting Chandrahasa to visit the family's Kali temple that evening, alone, assuring him it was their custom. Meanwhile, the raja of Kuntala decided to abdicate his throne due to one of his dreams, resolving to name Chandrahasa as his heir, and marry him off to his daughter.

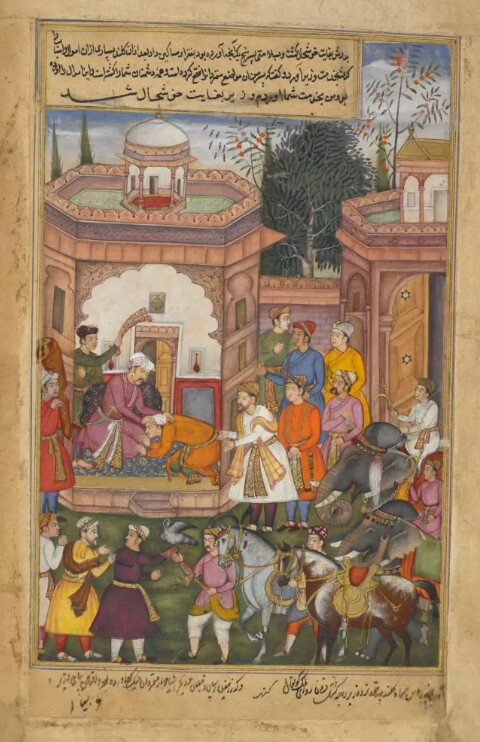
Chandrahasa bends his knee before the king of Kuntala made by Kanhar. folio of Razmnama.

Madana was asked to convey this message. Madana met Chandrahasa, asking him to rush to the palace immediately and took his place to go the temple. He was promptly assassinated there by the murderers sent by Dushtabuddhi. Chandrahasa went to the palace and was immediately married to the princess, Champakamalini, and was crowned as the king. When the tidings of his son's tragic death reached Dushtabuddhi, he was devastated and decided to end his life, going to the Kali temple and beheading himself. When Chandrahasa learnt of this twin tragedy, he went to the temple and prayed to goddess Kali to restore the two to life. When there was no answer, he proceeded to offer himself as a sacrifice to the goddess, following which Kali appeared before him and granted his wish. Chandrahasa ruled as the king of Kuntala and Chandanavati with his two queens.

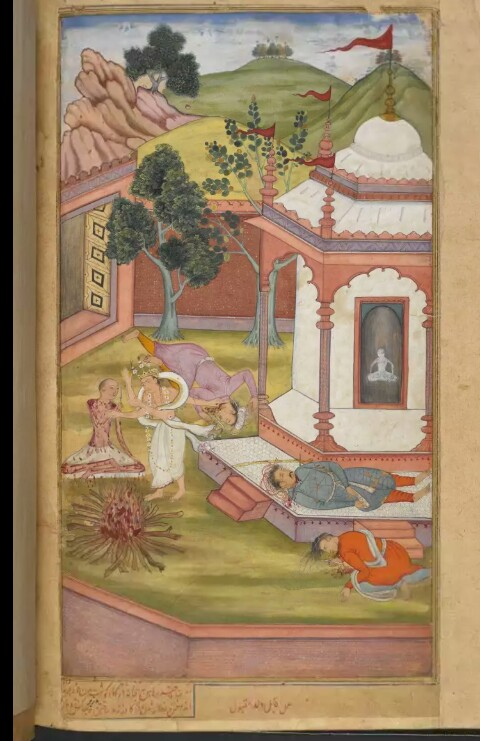
Chandrahasa's sacrifice, made by Qabil. folio of Razmnama

=== Ashvamedha ===
Chandrahasa ruled his kingdom for many years, having invited Kulinda to Kuntala. He had a son by the name of Padmaksha from Champakamalini, and Makaraksha from Vishaya, the minister's daughter. When these two boys were walking in the outskirts of the town one day, they chanced upon the stallion of Yudhishtira's ashvamedha yagna; dismayed, they came back and informed their father of it. Chandrahasa met Krishna and Arjuna and treated them in a royal manner offering them abundant wealth and men for the yagna. He anointed his son Makaraksha as the king, and joined Krishna and Arjuna, along with his kingdom's army.

== In popular culture ==
The story was composed in Yakshagana and is regularly performed in Karnataka state. The story of Chandrahasa has been depicted in a number of Indian films, including: Chandrahasa (1921) and Chandrahasa (1928) by Kanjibhai Rathod, Chandrahasa (1929) by Dhundiraj Govind Phalke, Chandrahasa (1933) by Sarvottam Badami, Chandrahasan (1936) by Profulla Ghosh, Chandrahasa (1941) by M. L. Rangaiah, Chandrahasa (1947) by Gunjal, Chandrahasa (1947) by Shantesh C Patil, Chandrahasa (1965) by B. S. Ranga in both Telugu (with Hara Nadh and Krishna Kumari, Gummadi in the lead roles and Kannada, with Raj Kumar and Leelavati.
