= Gunsundari (1934 film) =

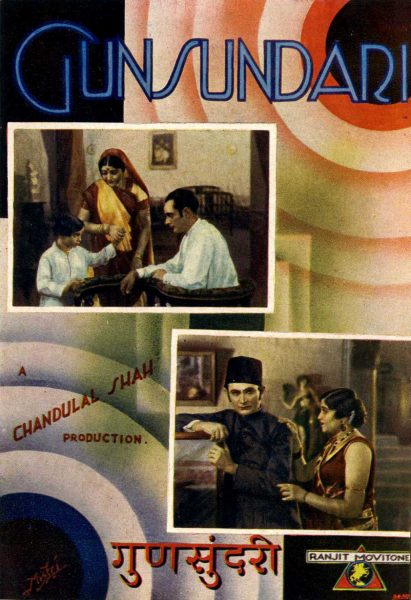
- Poster
- Directed by: Chandulal Shah
- Written by: Chandulal Shah
- Starring: Gohar; E. Bilimoria
- Cinematography: Pandurang Naik
- Music by: Rewashankar Marwadi, Gangaprasad Pathak
- Production company: Ranjit Movietone
- Release date: 1934
- Running time: 185 minutes
- Country: India
- Language: Hindi

Gunsundari is 1934 Indian Hindi social drama film directed by Chandulal Shah. The film was a remake of 1927 film of same name and was remade again in 1948. It was a commercial success.

== Plot ==
Shyamaldas has two sons, Chandrakant and Vinu, and a daughter, Kusum. Due to his alcoholic father's behaviour, Chandrakant is disheartened and falls for schemes of Madanrai and the prostitute Bansari who are plotting to get his property. Sushila, a sister-in-law of Chandrakant's wife Gunsundari, has a troubled relationship with his husband Vasantrai who takes away her necklace. Gunsundari helps her by giving her some money which she can not reveal to anyone due to promise of secrecy. She gets into trouble for it later. Gunsundari tries to save his husband by seducing him back to his family but was cast out to streets. She eventually meets her husband Chandrakant who has been to streets now. At the end, it is found that dead Shyamaldas has left all his property to Chandrakant.

== Cast ==
The cast is as follows:

- Gohar as Gunsundari
- Keki Bawa as Shyamaldas
- E. Bilimoria as Chandrakant
- Ram Apte as Vinu
- Shanta as Kusum
- Gangaprasad Pathak as Madanrai
- Rampiyari as Bansari
- Ghory as Vasantrai
- Kamlabai Gokhale as Sushila

Other cast include Charubala and Dixit.

== Production ==
After advent of talkies, Chandulal Shah remade his 1927 silent film Gunsundari in Hindi.

== Music ==
Rewashankar Marwadi and Gangaprasad Pathak gave music for the film.

The songs were as follows:

- Gagari Chhalak Na Jaay Gori Gagari
- Mujhe Mat Chhedo Baar Baar
- Tumhen Ye To Soojhi Nayi Tadbeer
- Jal Bharne Ko Main Gayi Thi Sanwariya
- Piya Man Bas Gayi Kya Koi Baala
- Parde Mein Muskura Kar Bijli Se Ye Gira Kar
- Mora Saiyan Sautaniya Ke Dwar Gayo Re
- Kahan Le Jayen Is Dil Ko
- Jiya Dharat Naahi Dheer Dheer Re
- Chalo Patjhad Rut Beet Gayi

== Reception ==
The film ran for 14 weeks and was commercially successful.

== Remake ==
It was remade again in 1948 under Ajit Pictures and directed by Shah's nephew Ratilal Punatar and starred Nirupa Roy. However, this version include some changes to reflect their times.
