= Chandulal Shah =

Indian director and producer (1898–1975)

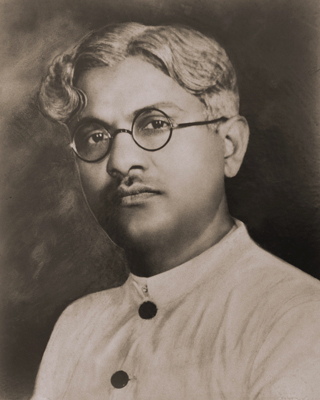
- Shah is the 1948 IMPPA President
- Born: Chandulal Jesangbhai Shah; 13 April 1898; Jamnagar, Gujarat, India
- Died: 25 November 1975 (aged 77); Bombay, Maharashtra, India
- Other name: Chandulal J. Shah / Chandulal Shah
- Occupations: Film director, producer founded Ranjit Studios (1929)
- Years active: 1925–1963
- Spouse: Kesarben Chandulal Shah

Chandulal Jesangbhai Shah (13 April 1898 – 25 November 1975) was a famous director, producer and screenwriter of Indian films, who founded Ranjit Studios in 1929.

== Early life ==
Shah was born in 1898 in Jamnagar, Gujarat, British India. He studied at Sydenham College in Bombay (now Mumbai) and got a job at the Bombay Stock Exchange in 1924. While waiting to get a job he helped his brother, J. D. Shah, who was a writer for mythological films. He was called by the "Laxmi Film Company" to direct a film Vimla in 1925 as its director Manilal Joshi was bedridden. Chandulal Shah not only directed the film but also went on to do two more films for the company, Panch Danda (1925) and Madhav Kam Kundala (1926) before returning to the Stock Exchange.

== Film career ==
Amarchand Shroff, a friend of Shah, who was with the Laxmi Film Company, brought him to Kohinoor Film Company where he first came into contact with Gohar, a contact that eventually developed into both a personal and professional relationship.

The first film independently directed by him at Kohinoor was Typist Girl (1926) starring Sulochana and Gohar which was made in 17 days. The film did extremely well at the box-office leading Shah to direct another five films for the studio all featuring Gohar. Of these, the most famous was Gunsundari (1927).

Dissatisfied with Kohinoor, Shah and Gohar went to Jagdish Film Company where Shah wrote and directed four films all with Gohar.

In 1929, Shah and Gohar founded Ranjit Studios at Bombay financed by Vithaldas Thakoredas. It produced films between 1929 and mid-1970s. The company began production of silent films in 1929 under the banner Ranjit Film Company and by 1932 had made 39 pictures, most of them social dramas. With the advent of sound, Ranjit Film Company became Ranjit Movietone in 1932 and during the 1930s produced numerous successful talkies at the rate of about six a year. At this time, the studio employed around 300 actors, technicians and other employees. Some of successful film of the studio include Sati Savitri (1932), Barrister’s Wife (1935), The Secretary (1938), Achhut (1940), Tansen (1943), Moorti (1943) and Jogan (1950).

Besides Filmmaking, Chandulal Shah also devoted a lot of time to the organizational work of the Indian Film Industry. Both the Silver Jubilee (1939) and the Golden Jubilee of the Indian film Industry (1963) were celebrated under his guidance. He was the first president of The Film Federation of India formed in 1951 and even led an Indian delegation to Hollywood the following year.

== Later life and death ==
Shah's downfall started when Raj Kapoor and Nargis starrer Paapi (1953) failed at the box office. He directed three films thereafter; Ootpatang (1955), Zameen ke Taare (1960) and Akeli Mat Jaiyo (1963), the last co-directed with Nandlal Jaswantlal. He took to gambling and horse racing. On 25 November 1975, the industry's most powerful man, who once owned a fleet of cars, was reduced to travelling in buses and died penniless.

== Filmography ==
=== Director ===
- Zameen Ke Tare (1960)
- Oot Patang (1955)
- Papi (1953)
- Achhut (1940)
- Pardesi Pankhi (1937)
- Prabhu Ka Pyara (1936)
- Sipahi Ki Sajni (1936)
- Sipahini Sajni (1936)
- Barrister's Wife (1935)
- Desh Dasi (1935)
- Keemti Aansoo (1935)
- Toofani Taruni (1934)
- Gunsundari (1934)
- Miss 1933 (1933)
- Radha Rani (1932)
- Sati Savitri (1932)
- Sheil Bala (1932)
- Devi Devayani (1931)
- Diwani Dilbar (1930)
- My Darling (1930)
- Raj Lakshmi (1930)
- Bhikharan (1929)
- Chandramukhi (1929)
- Pati Patni (1929)
- Rajputani (1929)
- Grihalakshmi (1928)
- Vishwamohini (1928)
- Gunsundari (1927)
- Sindh Ni Sumari (1927)
- Madhav Kam Kundala (1926)
- Five Divine Wands (1925)
- Vimla (1925)
- Panchdanda (1925)
- Typist Girl (1925)

=== Writer ===
- Akeli Mat Jaiyo (1963) [story & screenplay as Chandulal J. Shah]
- Papi (1953) [story, scenario & dialogue]
- Achhut (1940)
- Prabhu Ka Pyara (1936)
- Sipahi Ki Sajni (1936)
- Sipahini Sajni (1936)
- Gunsundari (1934)
- Sati Savitri (1932) [story]

=== Producer ===
- Akeli Mat Jaiyo (1963)
- Aurat Teri Yahi Kahani (1954)
- Dhobi Doctor (1954)
- Bahadur (1953)
- Footpath (1953)
- Papi (1953)
- Humlog (1951)
- Jogan (1950) (uncredited)
- Madhubala (1950)
- Nili (1950)
- Bhool Bhulaiya (1949)
- Garibi (1949)
- Nazare (1949)
- Bichhade Balam (1948)
- Jai Hanuman (1948)
- Mitti Ke Khiloune (1948)
- Pardesi Mehman (1948)
- Bela (1947)
- Chhin Le Azadi (1947)
- Duniya Ek Sarai (1947)
- Kaum Hamara (1947)
- Lakhon Mein Ek (1947)
- Piya Ghar Aja (1947)
- Woh Zamana (1947)
- Dharti (1946)
- Phoolwari (1946)
- Rajputani (1946)
- Chand Chakori (1945)
- Moorti (1945)
- Prabhuka Ghar (1945)
- Bhanvara (1944)
- Caravan (1944)
- Mumtaz Mahal (1944)
- Pagli Duniya (1944)
- Shahenshah Babar (1944)
- Andhera (1943)
- Bansari (1943)
- Gauri (1943)
- Nurse (1943)
- Shankar Parvati (1943)
- Tansen (1943)
- Vishkanya (1943)
- Armaan (1942)
- Bhakta Surdas (1942)
- Chandni (1942)
- Dhiraj (1942)
- Dukh Sukh (1942)
- Fariyad (1942)
- Iqrar (1942)
- Maheman (1942)
- Return of Toofan Mail (1942)
- Dhandora (1941)
- Pardesi (1941)
- Sasural (1941)
- Shaadi (1941)
- Ummeed (1941)
- Aaj Ka Hindustan (1940)
- Achhut (1940)
- Diwali (1940)
- Holi (1940)
- Musafir (1940)
- Pagal (1940)
- Adhuri Kahani (1939)
- Nadi Kinare (1939)
- Sant Tulsidas (1939)
- Thokar (1939)
- Baazigar (1938)
- Ban Ki Chidiya (1938)
- Billi (1938)
- Gorakh Aya (1938)
- Prithvi Putra (1938)
- Professor Waman MSc (1938)
- Rikshawala (1938)
- Secretary (1938)
- Dil Faroshi (1937)
- Mitti Ka Putla (1937)
- Pardesi Pankhi (1937)
- Shama Parwana (1937)
- Sharafi Loot (1937)
- Toofani Toli (1937)
- Zamin Ka Chand (1937)
- Chalak Chor (1936)
- Dil Ka Daku (1936)
- Jwalamukhi (1936)
- Laheri Lala (1936)
- Matlabi Duniya (1936)
- Prabhu Ka Pyara (1936)
- Raj Ramani (1936)
- Rangila Raja (1936)
- Sipahi Ki Sajni (1936)
- Barrister's Wife (1935)
- College Girl (1935)
- Desh Dasi (1935)
- Kimti Ansoo (1935)
- Noore Watan (1935)
- Raat Ki Rani (1935)
- Gunsundari (1934)
- Kashmeera (1934)
- Nadira (1934)
- Sitamgar (1934)
- Toofan Mail (1934)
- Toofani Taruni (1934)
- Veer Babruvahan (1934)
- Bhola Shikar (1933)
- Bhool Bhulaiya (1933)
- Krishna Sudama (1933)
- Miss 1933 (1933)
- Pardesi Preetam (1933)
- Lal Sawar (1932)
- Sipahsalar (1932)
- The Captain (1932)
- Bombay The Mysterious (1931)
- Bugles of War (1931)
- Desert Damsel (1931)
- Drums of Love (1931)
- Hoor-E-Roshan (1931)
- Love Birds (1931)
- Milkmaid (1931)
- Painted Angel (1931)
- Prince Charming (1931)
- Sinning Souls (1931)
- Siren of Baghdad (1931)
- The Knife (1931)
- Beloved Rogue (1930)
- Castles in the Air (1930)
- Divine Dowry (1930)
- Glory of India (1930)
- Jawan Mard (1930)
- Love Angle (1930)
- Magic Flame (1930)
- My Darling (1930)
- Outlaw of Sorath (1930)
- Patriot (1930)
- Ranak Devi (1930) based on Ranakadevi legend
- Romances of Radha (1930)
- The Tigress (1930)
- Wild Flower (1930)

== See also ==
Ranjit Studios
