= List of Hindi films of 1941 =

A list of films produced by the Bollywood film industry based in Mumbai in 1941:

== Highest-grossing films ==
These were the six highest-grossing films at the Indian box office in 1941:

Rank	Title	Nett collection
1	Khazanchi	₹70 lakh
2	Chitralekha	₹55 lakh
3	Sikandar	₹50 lakh
4	Jhoola	₹45 lakh
5	Lagan	₹40 lakh
6	Bahen	₹38 lakh

== A-B ==
Title	Director	Cast	Genre	Notes
Aasra	Chimankant Gandhi, Lalit Mehta	Sardar Akhtar, Amar, Husn Banu, Veena, Bhudo Advani, Nisar Ahmad Ansari, Kanhaiyalal	Social	Music: Anil Biswas; Lyrics: Safdar Aah
Abla	R.N. Vaidya	Chandrika, Sheila Haldar, Ghulam Mohammed, Surya Kumari, Sunder, Shyam Narayan, Hiralal, Chandrika	Social	Music: Khurshid Khan; Lyrics: Pandit Gyan Chandra
Akela	Pesi Karani	Bibbo, Mazhar Khan, E. Billimoria, Protima Devi, Miss Moti, Mohammed Hadi	Social	Music: Khan Mastana Lyrics: Pyare Lal Santoshi
Allaudin Laila	A. M. Khan	Jayant, Ameena, Zahur, Ghulam Mohammed, Indu Rani, Violet Cooper, N. A. Ansari, Nawab, Gulab	Costume Fantasy	Music: Master Basheer; Lyrics: Munshi Nayab
Amrit	Master Vinayak	Master Vithal, Meenakshi, Damuanna Malvankar, Dada Salvi, Baburao Pendharkar, Lalita Pawar	Social	Music: Dada Chandekar; Lyrics: Pandit Indra
Anjaan	Amiya Chakravarty	Devika Rani, Ashok Kumar, V. H. Desai, David, Om Prakash, Girish, Suresh, Fenty Prasad, Rajkumari, Gulab, P Pithavala	Social	Music: Panna Lal Ghosh; Lyrics: Pyare Lal Santoshi, Kavi Pradeep
Bahen	Mehboob Khan	Sheikh Mukhtar, Nalini Jaywant, Harish, Meena Kumari, Husn Banu, Swaroop Rani, Kanhaiyalal, Shahzadi, Bhudo Advani, Agashe	Family Drama	Music: Anil Biswas; Lyrics: Safdar Aah
Bambai Ki Sair a.k.a. Holiday in Bombay	Sarvottam Badami	Shobhana Samarth, Sabita Devi, E. Bilimoria, Vatsala Kumtekar, Jal Merchant, Ghory	Comedy	Music: Khemchand Prakash; Lyrics: D. N. Madhok, Munshi Dil, B. R. Sharma, Pandit Indra
Beti	Jayant Desai	Khursheed, Arun Kumar, Vasanti, E. Billimoria, Ghory, Bhagwandas, Ghorpure, Nagendra, Kesarbai, Khatoon	Family Social	Music: Gyan Dutt; Lyrics: B R Sharma, D. N. Madhok
Bombaiwali (Bambaiwali)	Homi Wadia	Fearless Nadia, John Cawas, Sardar Mansoor, Radharani, Dalpat, Mithu Miya, Boman Shroff, Bibijan, Master Chhotu, Azim	Action	Music: Madhavlal Damodar Master; Lyrics: Waheed Qureshi
Bulbule Baghdad	K. Amarnath	Yakub, Jayant, Indurani, Sadiq, W. M. Khan, Anant Marathe, Ghulam Rasool		Music: Ram Gopal Pandey; Lyrics: Ehsan Rizvi

== C-D ==
Title	Director	Cast	Genre	Notes
Chandan	Dhirubhai Desai	Nazir, Ashiq Hussain, Kanta Kumari, Maya Bannerji, Lalita. Sadiq, Jamshedji, Anwaribai	Social	Music: S. N. Tripathi; Lyrics: Pandit Indra
Charnon Ki Dasi	Gajanan Jagirdar	Durga Khote, Vanmala, Jagirdar, kusum Deshpande, Avinash, Kelkar	Family Drama	Music: Anna Saheb Mainkar; Lyrics: Pandit Anand Kumar
Chaudhry	Niranjan Bhardawaj	Pran, Noor Jehan, Ghulam Mohammed, M. Esmail	Social	Music: Ghulam Haider; Lyrics:
Chitralekha	Kidar Nath Sharma	Mehtab, Nandrekar, Monica Desai, Bharat Bhushan, Rajinder Singh, Ram Dulari, Leela Mishra, A.S. Gyani	Costume Drama	Bharat Bhushan's debut film. Based on Bhagwati Charan Varma's novel. Music: Jhande Khan, A. S. Gyani; Lyrics: Kidar Sharma
Circus Ki Sundari	Balwant Bhatt	Moti, Jal Merchant, Agha, Dhulia, S. L. Puri, A. Karim	Action	Music: Khan Mastana; Lyrics: Pyare Lal Santoshi, A. Karim
Darpan	A. H. Essa	Shobhana Samarth, Yakub, Balwant Singh, Essa	Social	Music: Lyrics:
Darshan	Chimanlal Luhar	Prem Adib, Jyoti, Kaushalya, Bhudo Advani, Miradevi, M. Nazir, Shakir, Amirbai Karnataki, Madhusudan	Social	Music: Naushad; Lyrics: Pandit Indra
Dhandora	Charlie	Charlie, Husn Banu, E. Billimoria, Shamim, Dixit, Ghory, Bhagwandas, Kesari	Comedy	Music: Gyan Dutt; Lyrics: D. N. Madhok
Doctor	Subodh Mitra	Pankaj Mullick, Bharati Devi Ahindra Choudhury, Jyoti Prakash, Master Meenu, Nemo, Amar Mullick, Buddhadeb, Indu Mukherjee, Panna Rani	Social	Music: One of the rare films where Pankaj Mullick was actor-composer. Pankaj Mullick; Lyrics: Arzu Lakhnavi, A. H. Shor
Garib Ki Ladki	Jyotish Mukherji	Hashmat, C. M. Hussain, Kamla Jharia, Mohammed Hussain, Ram Dulari	Social	Music: Veer Chandra, Kartik Chatterjee; Lyrics:
Ghar Ki Laaj	V. M. Vyas	Shanta Hublikar, Nazir, Jagdish Sethi, Kaushalya, Kalyani, Mirza Musharraf, Majid, Hadi	Family Drama	Music: Annasaheb Mainkar; Lyrics: Ehsan Rizvi

== E-K ==
Title	Director	Cast	Genre	Notes
Hamara Desh	Jani Babu	Anil Kumar, Lily, Jani Babu, Amirbai Karnakaki, Khalil, Alam, Rafiq, N. A. Ansari	Action Social	Music: Batish; Lyrics:
Himmat	R. K. Shorey	Manorama, Radharani, Ragini, Zahur Shah, Majnu, Beg, Ghulam Qadir	Action	Music: Gobind Ram; Lyrics: Aziz Kashmiri
Jadui Bandhan	Nanubhai Vakil	Sarojini, Shiraz, Baburao Pehalwan, Rafiq, N. A. Ansari, Garib Shah, Mirajkar, Haroon	Fantasy, Science Fiction	Music: Ram Gopal Pandey; Lyrics: Pandit Anuj
Jawani Ka Rang	Saki	Shakuntala Ameer Hussein, Inamdar, Roshanara, Mirajkar	Social	Music: Lyrics:
Jhoola	Gyan Mukherjee	Leela Chitnis, Ashok Kumar, Shah Nawaz, Aruna Devi, V. H. Desai, Mumtaz Ali	Social	Music: Saraswati Devi; Lyrics: Kavi Pradeep
Kanchan	Manibhai Vyas	Leela Chitnis, Vimala Vasishta, Arun Kumar, Pramila, Mubarak, Kesari	Social	Naushad recorded his first song for this film: "Bata Do Koi Kaun Gali More Sham", though Prem Nagar (1940) released earlier. Music: Gyan Dutt, Naushad (1); Lyrics: D. N. Madhok
Kasauti	Ramchandra Thakur	Rose, Prahlad, Veena, Sunalini Devi, Satish, Maruti, N. A, Ansari, Agha, Baby Meena Kumari	Social	Music: Ashok Ghosh; Lyrics: Kanhaiyalal Chaturvedi
Khazanchi	Moti B. Gidwani	M. Ismail, Ramola, S. D. Narang, Pran, Jankidas, Ajmal	Social	Music: Ghulam Haider; Lyrics: Wali Sahib
Kurmai	J. K. Nanda	Jagdish Sethi, Radharani, Jeevan, Shanti, Wasti, A. Shah, Ram Avtar	Social	Music: Khurshid Anwar; Lyrics: D. N. Madhok

== L-M ==
Title	Director	Cast	Genre	Notes
Lagan	Nitin Bose	K. L. Saigal, Kanan Devi, Nawab, Jagdish Sethi, Nemo, Rehmat Bibi, Naresh Bose	Romantic Drama	Music: R. C. Boral; Lyrics: D. N. Madhok
Laheri Jeewan	S.M. Yusuf	Husn Banu, Gope, W. M. Khan, Kurbanjan, Fatty Prasad	Action	Music: Vasant Kumar Naidu; Lyrics:
Madhusudhan	Balwant Bhatt	Kumar, Maya Bannerji, Badri Prasad, Jeevan, Gulab, Ashalata	Social	Music: Pandit Badri Prasad; Lyrics: A. Karim
Mala	Mahendra Thakore, P. Jairaj	Rose, P. Jairaj, Jayant, M. Nazir, Daya Devi, Heera Kumari, Munshi Khanjar, Athavale	Social Drama	Music: Naushad; Lyrics: D. N. Madhok, Baalam Pardesi
Manthan	Ramji Arya	Dalpat, Radharani, Sardar Mansur, Boman Shroff, M. K. Hasan, Rajkumari	Costume Drama	Music: Baldev Nayak; Lyrics: Pandit Phani
Masoom	S.F. Hasnain	Ramola, Mehtab, Mazhar Khan, Sajjan, Nazir Kashmiri, Anees, Khwaja Sabir, Muzammil	Social	Music: Munshi Mubarak Hussain; Lyrics: Arzu Lakhnavi, Mirza Ghalib
Mere Raja	T. S. Mani	Moti, Mazhar Khan, Shankar Vazare, E. Bilimoria, Bibbo, Kanta Kumari, Vazre, Anwaribai	Action	Music: Damodar Sharma; Lyrics: I. C. Kapoor
Mere Sajan	Ahmed H. Essa	Jayant, Urmila, Rajkumari, Sayani Atish, W. M. Khan, Putlibai, Munchi Tuthi, Gulab	Social	Music: Hafiz Khan Mastana, Vasant Kumar Naidu; Lyrics: Waheed Qureshi
Meri Khwahish	Harbanslal, R. D. Rajput	Ramesh, Kokila, Mirajkar, A. Karim, Sharifa	Social	Music: Shanti Kumar, Vasant; Lyrics: Baalam Pardesi, A. K. Sindhu
Muslim Ka Lal	A. M. Khan	Benjamin, Kalyani, Ameena, Anil Kumar, Samson, S. Alam	Action	Music: Madhav Lal; Lyrics:

== N-R ==
Title	Director	Cast	Genre	Notes
Nai Roshni	Chimankant Gandhi, L. Mehta	Sardar Akhtar, Harish, Husn Banu, Amar, Kanhaiyalal, Sunalini Devi, Bhudo Advani, Agha, Sankatha Prasad, Baby Meena Kumari	Social	Music: Anil Biswas; Lyrics:
Naya Sansar	N. R. Acharya	Renuka Devi, Ashok Kumar, Mubarak, Khurshid, David, Shah Nawaz, Suresh, Mahesh Kaul, V. S. Desai, Jagannath, Sushil Kumar, P. F. Pithavala, Azurie	Social	Music: Saraswati Devi, Ramchandra Pal; Lyrics: Kavi Pradeep
Nirdosh	V. C. Desai	Nalini Jaywant, Mukesh, Kanhaiyalal, Agha, Sankatha Prasad, Satish, Gulzar, Tiwari, Jani, Hemlata, Kayam Ali	Social	Music: Ashok Ghosh; Lyrics: Neelkanth Tiwari, Kanhaiyalal Chaturvedi, Zia Sarhadi (1)
Padosi	V. Shantaram	Mazhar Khan, Gajanan Jagirdar, Anees Khatoon, Radhakrishan, Balwant Singh, Casshyap, Vasant Singh, Sarla Devi, Lajwanti, Sumitra, Gopal, Balak Ram	Social Drama	Music: Master Krishnarao; Lyrics: Pandit Sudarshan
Paisa	G. P. Pawar	Madhav Kale, Kanta Kumari, Indira Wadkar, Shakuntala Paranjpye, Raja Pandit, Devaskar	Social	Music: C. Balaji; Lyrics:
Pardesi	Chaturbhuj Doshi	Motilal, Khursheed, Snehprabha, E. Bilimoria	Social	Music: Khemchand Prakash; Lyrics: D. N. Madhok
Prabhat	Vishnu Vyas	P. Jairaj, Khurshid, David, Shah Nawaz, Suresh, Mahesh Kaul, V. S. Desai, Jagannath, Sushil Kumar, P. F. Pithavala, Azurie	Social	Music: Saraswati Devi, Ramchandra Pal; Lyrics: Kavi Pradeep
Pyaas	Ram Daryani	Ishwarlal, Snehprabha Pradhan, Gope, Nazir, Shamim, Gulab, Khatoon	Social	Music: Khemchand Prakash; Lyrics: D. N. Madhok
Radhika	V. C. Desai	Harish, Nalini Jaywant, Jyoti, Kanhaiyalal, Sankata Prasad, Sunalini Devi, Pesi Patel, Veena, Bhudo Advani		Music: Ashok Ghosh; Lyrics: K. B. Lal, Neelkanth Tiwari (1), Kanhaiyalal Chaturvedi (1)
Raj Nartaki a.k.a. The Court Dancer	Modhu Bose	Sadhana Bose, Prithviraj Kapoor, Protima Das Gupta, Benita Gupta, Jal Khambata, Nayampalli, Thapan, Simeons, Prabhat Sinha	Costume Dance	Produced by J.B.H. Wadia in English, Hindi and Bengali. Music: Timir Baran
Red Signal	Nari Ghadiali	Benjamin, Urmila, Agha, Noor Jehan, Samson, Manchi Tuthi, Samson, Bibijan	Action	Music: Chandekar; Lyrics:

== S-Z ==
Title	Director	Cast	Genre	Notes
Safed Sawar	Nari Ghadiali	Radharani, Agha, Navin Yagnik, Sayani Aatish, Anant Marathe, Fazlu, Shahzadi, Munchi Thuthi, Mumtaz	Action	Music: Lyrics:
Sajjan	Dwarka Khosla	Husn Banu, Jagdish Sethi, Urmila, Satish Batra, David, Agha, Gope	Social	Music: Pratap Mukherjee; Lyrics: Pandit Phani
Sangam a.k.a. Confluence	R. S. Junarrkar	Master Vinayak, Minakshi, Vatsala Kumtekar, Damuanna Malvankar, Sundarbai, Gupte, Jog, Nandu Khote, Salvi	Social	Music: Dada Chandekar; Lyrics: Amritlal Nagar, Jai Shankar Prasad (1)
Sant Sakhu	Vishnupant Govind Damle, Sheikh Fattelal	Hansa Wadkar, Gauri, Shankar Kulkarni, Shanta Majumdar, Sumitra	Biopic Legend Devotional	Music: Keshavrao Bhole; Lyrics: Pyarelal Santoshi, Mukhram Sharma Ashant
Sasural	Chaturbhuj Doshi	Motilal, Madhuri, Noor Jehan, Urmila, Kantilal, Miss Iqbal, Bhagwandas, Tarabai, Bhim, Popatlal	Family Drama	Music: Gyan Dutt; Lyrics: D. N. Madhok
Seedha Rasta	Dawood Baig	Radharani, Sushil Kumar, Jagdish Sethi, Jilloo, A. R. Pehalwan, Mumtaz Begum, Omkar	Social	Music: Harishchandra Bali; Lyrics: Narendranath Tuli
Shaadi	Jayant Desai	Madhuri, Motilal, Khursheed, Ishwarlal, Bhagwandas, Kantilal, Tarabai, Dixit, Ghory	Social Family Drama	Music: Khemchand Prakash; Lyrics:
Shahzadi	Jagatrai Pesumal Advani	Trilok Kapoor, Pramila, Alaka, W. M. Khan, Navinchandra, Sadiq, Bibijan, Abbas, Haroon, Gharib Shah, Mehar Banu, Madhurika	Costume	Music: Ram Gopal Pandey; Lyrics:
Sikandar	Sohrab Modi	Prithviraj KapoorSohrab Modi, Vanmala, Yakub, Zahur Raja, K. N. Singh, Sheela, Meena, Sadiq Ali, Shakir, Jilloo	Historical Epic Drama	Music: Mir Saheb, Rafique Gaznavi; Lyrics: Pandit Sudarshan
Sipahi	Daud Chand	Hiralal, Zohra, Madhavi, Altaf, Sunder, Nisar Ahmed, A. G. Butt, Baburao Pehalwan, Ghulam Mohammed, Mahomad Saffi, Nijamuddin	Action	Music: Soj, Jahangir, M. Noorudin; Lyrics:
Suhana Geet	M. A. Mirza	Trilok Kapoor, Ramola, Ranibala, Navin Yagnik, Hadi, Kamala, Shakir	Social	Music: Vasant Kumar Naidu; Lyrics:
Swami a.k.a. The Saint	A. R. Kardar	Nazir Ahmed Khan, Sitara Devi, P. Jairaj, Yakub, Jeevan, Majid, Badri Prasad, S. Nazir, Ram Avtar	Social	Music: Rafiq Ghaznavi; Lyrics: Shatir Ghaznavi, Tanveer Naqvi, Sahir, Pandit Indra
Taj Mahal	Nanubhai Vakil	Indurani, Kumar, Suraiya, Mubarak, Sarojini, S. Nazir, Khalil, Ram Marathe, Fakir Mohammed	Historical Drama	Music: Madhavlal Damodar Master; Lyrics: Behzad Lakhnavi, S. Khalil, Pandit Anuj
Torpedo	N. A. Mansoori	Munawwar Sultana, Yashwant Dave, Shahzadi, S. Nazir, Ameena, Samson, Gulab, Fazlu	Action	Music: Shyam Babu Pathak, Shanti Kumar; Lyrics: Kabil Amritsari
Tulsi	Gunjal	Trilok Kapoor, Shalini, Anant Marathe, Badri Prasad, Srinivas, Jamshedji	Devotional	Music: Harishchandra Bali; Lyrics: Pandit Phani
Ummeed	Manibhai Vyas	Ishwarlal, Prabha Devi, Dixit, Noor Jehan, Brijmala, Kesari, Bhagwandas, Gharpore, Charubala, Bhim	Comedy, Drama	Music: Khemchand Prakash; Lyrics: D. N. Madhok
Vanmala	Mohan Sinha	Maya Banerji, Pravin Kumar, Neela, Jeevan, Badri Prasad, Bibijan, Ghulam Rasool	Social	Music: Badri Prasad; Lyrics: Mohan Sinha
Zalim Saudagar a.k.a. Merchant Of Venice	J. J. Madan	Jehanara Kajjan, Khalil, Haider Bandi, Rani Premlata	Drama	Music: Lyrics:
