= Chitralekha =

Chitralekha may refer to:

- Chitralekha (deity), a Hindu deity
- Chitralekha (novel), a 1934 historical novel by Indian writer Bhagwati Charan Verma
  - Chitralekha (1941 film), a film based on the above novel
  - Chitralekha (1964 film), another film based on the same novel, starring Meena Kumari and Ashok Kumar
- Chitralekha (weekly), a Gujarati-language magazine in India

== See also ==
- Chitra (disambiguation)
- Lekh (disambiguation)
