= List of Hindi films of 1940 =

A list of films produced by the Hindi language film industry based in Mumbai in 1940:

== Highest-grossing films ==
The six highest-grossing films at the Indian box office in 1940:

Rank	Title	Nett collection
1	Zindagi	₹55 lakh
2	Bandhan	₹50 lakh
3	Achhut	₹40 lakh
4	Pagal	₹38 lakh
5	Nartaki	₹36 lakh
6	Punar Milan	₹34 lakh

== A ==
Title	Director	Cast	Genre	Notes
Aaj Ka Hindustan	Jayant Desai	Rose, Prithviraj Kapoor, SitaraDevi, Ishwarlal, Yakub, Kalyani, Tarabai, Charubala, Charlie	Social	Music: Khemchand Prakash; Lyrics: D. N. Madhok
Aaj Ki Duniya	G.P. Pawar	Trilok Kapoor, Ashalata, Jeevan, Vatsala Kumtekar, Gulab, Nazir Kashmiri, S. Nazir	Social	Music: Pratap Mukherji; Lyrics: A. Karim
Aandhi	Dinesh Ranjan Das	Pankaj Mullick, Khursheed, Molina Devi, K. C. Dey, Sulekha, Sham Laha, Nemo	Social	Music: K. C. Dey; Lyrics: Arzu Lucknavi
Abla Ki Shakti	Munshi Dil Lucknowi	Jehanara Kajjan, Khalil, Premlata, Phool Kumari	Social	Music: C. Solanki; Lyrics: Ustad Hussain Jan
Achhut	Chandulal Shah	Gohar Mamajiwala, Motilal, Vasanti, Mazhar Khan, Sitara Devi, Trilok Kapoor, Charlie, Dixit, Lala Yaqub, Ibrahim, Rajkumari	Social Drama	Music: Gyan Dutt; Lyrics: Pyare Lal Santoshi
Aflatoon Aurat	Kikubhai Desai	Moti, Mallika Pukhraj, Sardar Mansur, Kanta Kumari, Vatsala Kumtekar, S. Vazre, Bose, Razak, Dhulia, Bashir, Mirajkar	Action	Music: Damodar Sharma; Lyrics: Munshi Aziz
Alakh Niranjan a.k.a. Gorakhnath	Bhalji Pendharkar	Nandrekar, Leela, Raja Paranjpe, Vimal Sardesai, Chandrakant	Devotional	Music: Koregaonkar Dutta; Lyrics: Pandit Anand Kumar
Ali Baba	Mehboob Khan	Surendra, Sardar Akhtar, Ghulam Mohammed, Jagdish	Fantasy, Adventure	Music: Anil Biswas; Lyrics: Aah Sitapuri
Anarbala	A. M. Khan	Benjamin, Jani Babu, Shanta Kashmiri, N. A. Ansari, Usha Rani, M. Musa, Indira, Ameena, Rafiqe	Horror	Music: Master Mohammed; Lyrics: Munshi Nayab
Anjaam	Kanjibhai Rathod	Anil Kumar, Mehar Sultana, Rajkumari, Yashwant Dave, Samson, Fazlu	Costume	Music: Shanti Kumar; Lyrics: Kabil Amritsari
Anuradha	Mohan Sinha	Maya Banerjee, Trilok Kapoor, Jeevan, Vatsala Kumtekar, Shyam Sunder, Anant Marathe, S, Nazir, Agha, Ghulam Rasool, Mehdi Raza, Bibijan	Social	Music: Badri Prasad; Lyrics: Lajpat Rai
Apni Nagariya	Gunjal	Shobhana Samarth, Nazir, Jayant, K. N. Singh, Shanta Dutt, Madhavi, Bibijan, Keki Bawa	Social	Music: Rafiqe Ghaznavi; Lyrics: Aah Sitapuri, Pandit Indra
Aurat	Mehboob Khan	Sardar Akhtar, Surendra, Yakub, Jyoti, Kanhaiyalal, Arun Kumar, Harish, Brij Rani, Vatsala Kumtekar, Sunalini Devi	Social Family Drama	Music: Anil Biswas; Lyrics: Safdar Aah
Azad	N.R. Acharya	Leela Chitnis, Ashok Kumar, Hansa Wadkar, Mumtaz Ali, Nazir Bedi, Rama Shukal, Nana Palsikar, D. V. Surve, Ramchandra Pal	Social	Music: Saraswati Devi; Lyrics: J S Kashyap
Azadi-e-Watan	Dinshaw Billimoria	Mallika Pukhraj, D. Billimoria, W. M. Khan, Ashraf Khan, Ghulam Mohammed, Abdul Qadir	Social	Music: Munshi Dil; Lyrics: Munshi Dil

== B–D ==
Title	Director	Cast	Genre	Notes
Bahurani a.k.a. Daughter-in-Law	R.S. Junnarkar, Mubarak	Kishore Sahu, Rose, Anuradha, Mubarak, Madhurika, Pratima Devi, Masood, Nana Palsikar	Family	Music: Rafiq Ghaznavi; Lyrics: J. S. Kashyap, Azad
Bandhan	N. R. Acharya	Ashok Kumar, Leela Chitnis, Arun Kumar, P. F. Pithavala, V. H. Desai, Shah Nawaz, Purnima Desai, Jagganath	Romantic Drama	Music: Saraswati Devi, Ramchandra Pal; Lyrics: Kavi Pradeep
Bhairavsingh – Ek Rashtra sevak				
Bharosa	Sohrab Modi	Chandra Mohan, Sardar Akhtar, Mazhar Khan, Maya Devi, E. Tarapore, Sheela, Abu Bakar	Social	Music: G. P. Kapoor; Lyrics: Lalchand Bismil
Bholi Lutaran	A. M. Khan	Zohra Sehgal, Umakant, Ameena, Jani Babu, Shiraz, A. M. Khan, Ata Mohammed, Sadiq	Costume	Music: Haribhai Mistry, Master Mohammedd; Lyrics: Munshi Nayab
Captain Kishori	K. Amarnath	Nazir, Lalita Pawar, Yasmin, Agha	Action	Music: Ram Gopal Pande; Aslam Noori
Chalti Duniya	Gunjal, B. Marzban	Padma Devi, Rafiq Ghaznavi, Lakshmi, Ghulam Rasool, Leelavati,	Action	Music: Ram Gopal Pande; Lyrics:
Chingari	Sarvottam Badami	Prithviraj Kapoor, Sabita Devi, Keshavrao Date, E. Billimoria, Sunalini Devi, Khatoon, Bhagwandas, Mira, Tarabai	Social	Music: Gyan Dutt; Lyrics: J. S. Kashyap
Civil Marriage	Ramchandra Thakur	Snehprabha Pradhan, Harish, Arun Kumar, Kayam Ali, Sankatha Prasad, Bhudo Advani, Putlibai	Social	Music: Anupam Ghatak; Lyrics: Kanhaiyalal
Deepak	Dwarka Khosla	Prithviraj Kapoor, Ashalata, Jeevan, Anant Marathe, S. Nazir, Vatsala Kumtekar, Nazir Kashmiri, Baby Suman	Social	Music: Timir Baran; Lyrics: Lajpat Rai
Deepak Mahal	Nanubhai Vakil	Anil Kumar, Sarojini, Bibijan, Mirajkar, Indira, Khalil, Majid	Fantasy	Music: Ram Gopal Pande; Lyrics: B. R. Batish, Pandit Anuj
Desh Bhakta	A. H. Essa	Wazir Mohammed Khan, Harishchandra, Ashalata, Kashmiri, Gope, Agha, Nissar, Shah Nawaz, Pir Mohamed	Social	Music: V. K. Naidu; Lyrics: Waheed Qureshi, Shaifta
Dharma Bandhan	Jagatrai Pesumal Advani	Khursheed, Yusuf Effendi, Shyam Sunder, Zebunissa, Kaushalya, Jani Babu	Social	Music: B. R. Devdhar; Lyrics:
Diamond Queen	Homi Wadia	Fearless Nadia, John Cawas, Radha Rani, Sayani Atish, Sardar Mansur, Dalpat, Boman Shroff	Adventure Action Comedy	Music: Madhaval Damodar Master Lyrics: Munshi Sham
Divali	Jayant Desai	Motilal, Madhuri, Ishwarlal, Vasanti, Keshavrao Date, Dixit, Indubala, Suresh, Kesari, M. Bhagwandas	Social	Music: Khemchand Prakash; Lyrics: Pyare Lal Santoshi, D. N. Madhok, and Pandit Sudarshan
Dorangia Daku	Harnam Singh Rawail	Pushpa Rani, Sunder, Ghulam Mohammed, Baburao Pehalwan	Action	Music: G. K. Rampuri; Lyrics:

== E–J ==
Title	Director	Cast	Genre	Notes
Ek Hi Bhool	Vijay Bhatt	Mehtab, P. Jairaj, Umakant, Prahlad dutt, Munshi Khanjar, Baby Meena Kumari	Social Drama	Music: Shankar Rao Vyas; Lyrics: Pandit Anuj
Geeta	Parshwanath Yeshwant Altekar	Chandra Mohan, Durga Khote, Anant Marathe, Ashalata, Kashmiri, Vatsala Kumtekar, Keki Bawa, Suman	Social	Music: D. P. Koregaonkar; Lyrics: S. P. Kalla
Ghar Ki Rani	Master Vinayak	Master Vinayak, Meenakshi, Leela Chitnis, Baburao Pendharkar, Damuanna Malvankar, Kusuk Deshpande, Salvi	Family Drama	Music: Chandekar; Lyrics:
Golibar	Nanubhai Vakil	Moti, Navinchandra, Kanta Kumari, Vasantrao Pehalwan, Mirajkar, Sardar Mansur, Dhulia, Razaq, Bacha, S. L. Puri	Action	Music: Damodar Sharma; Lyrics:
Haar Jeet	Amar Mullick	Kanan Devi, Pahari Sanyal, Meera Dutta, Chhaya Devi, Nawab, Madho Shukla, Nand Kishore, Nemo, Ghulam Hussain	Social	Music: R. C. Boral; Lyrics: Arzu Luckhnavi, Kidar Sharma
Haiwan	A. M. Khan	Sitara Devi, Alaknanda, Bachchu, Tarabai	Action	Music: R. Pande; Lyrics:
Hatimtai Ki Beti	Nanubhai Vakil	Sarojini, Anil Kumar, Indurani, Anwaribai, Sayid Ahmed, Bibijan		Music: B. R. Batish, Master Madhavlal Damodar; Lyrics: Pandit Anuj
Hind Ka Lal	Homi Wadia, Ramji Arya	Radharani, Sardar Mansur, Boman Shroff, Dalpat, Mithu Miyan, Gulshan, Kasturi, Dilawar, Azurie, Nazira, Master Mohammed, Bismillah	Action	Music: Madhavlal Damodar Master; Lyrics: Ata Biswani
Hindustan Hamara	Ram Daryani	Jamuna, Padmadevi, Nandrekar, Ram Dulari, Devaskar, Hari Shivdasani, Badri Prasad	Social	Music: B. Chatterji; Lyrics: Arzu Luckhnavi
Holi	Abdul Rashid Kardar	Motilal, Khursheed, Ishwarlal, Sitara Devi, Ghory, Dixit, Lala Yaqub, Tarabai, Mirza Musharraf, Keshavrao Date, Bhagwandas	Social Drama	Music: Khemchand Prakash; Lyrics: D. N. Madhok
Jadui Kangan	Nanubhai Vakil	Master Vithal, Kokila, Rajkumari, Sunita Devi, Kamal, Nawaz, Sadique, Majid, Krishna Kumari, Haroon, Mohanlal Mishra	Fantasy	Music: Shanti Kumar; Lyrics: Pandit Phani
Jadu Nagri	B. Apte	Rajkumari, Yashwant Dave, Shamim, Tarabai	Fantasy	Music: Shanti Kumar Desai; Lyrics: Kabil Amritsari
Jagat Mohini	Chunilal Parikh	Master Vithal, Kokila, Sunita Devi, Majid, Kamal, Krishna Kumari Sr., Mohanlal, Mishra, Haroon, Amritlal Nagar		Music: Madhavlal Master; Lyrics: Pandit Phani
Jai Swadesh	Aspi Irani	Radharani, Benjamin, Sayani Atish, Vatsala Kumtekar, Azurie, Abdul Haq	Action Social	Music: Madhavlal Master; Lyrics: Waheed Qureshi
Jhuthi Sharm	Mohan Dayaram Bhavnani	Trilok Kapoor, Bimla Kumari, Navin Yagnik, Nirmala Devi, Rajkumari, Nayampalli, Rai Mohan, Sharifa	Social	Music: Badri Prasad; Lyrics: D. N. Madhok

== K–N ==
Title	Director	Cast	Genre	Notes
Kalyani	Premankur Atorthy	Rattanbai, W. M. Khan, Ghulam Mohammed, Jilloo, Mukhtar, Kesar, Jamshedji, Sayed Ahmed	Social	Music: H. C. Bali; Lyrics: Pyare Lal Santoshi
Kumkum the Dancer	Modhu Bose	Sadhona Bose, Dhiraj Bhattacharya, Preeti Majumdar, Moni Chatterjee, Kayam Ali, Padma Devi, Lalit Roy, M. Ishaq, Bhudo Advani, Kamta Prasad, Jamshedji	Costume Drama	Music: Timir Baran; Lyrics: Pandit Sudarshan
Kanyadan	V. M. Vyas	Kalyani Ds, Ashiq Hussain, Shamim, Ghulam Mohammed, Jamshedji, Hadi, Jilloo	Social	Music: Mushtaq Hussain; Lyrics: A. Shah
Laxmi	Mohan Sinha	Kumar, Ishrat Sultana, Maya, Bibbo, Jeevan, Gope, Bibijan, Ghulam Rasool, Mehdi Raja	Social	Music: Timir Baran; Lyrics: Mohan Sinha
Main Hari	Gajanan Jagirdar	Navin Yagnik, Naseem, Maya Devi, Ghulam Hussain, Hari Shivdasani	Social	Music: Mir Sahib; Lyrics: Kamal Amrohi
Madari Mohan	Babu Rao Pokal, R, Varde	Satyarani, Devaskar, Sunita Devi, Ramchandra Varde, Vasant Kanse, Kashinath, Tara	Fantasy	Music: B R Deodhar, K Narayan Rao; Lyrics: B. G. Joglekar, Pandit Phani
Matwali Mira	Prafulla Roy	Husn Banu, Nissar, Sultana Banu, Ranjit Kumari, Fakir Mohammed, Kamla, Fida Hussain	Devotional	Music: Brijlal Verma; Lyrics:
Medha Sharma				
Mohini	Madhukar Bavdekar, Annasaheb Rajopadhye	Master Vithal		Music: Lyrics:
Musafir	Chaturbhuj Doshi	Ishwarlal, Khursheed, Yakub, Charlie, Vasanti, Bhupatrai, Kesari, Mirza Musharaf, Bhagwandas	Social	Music: Gyan Dutt; Lyrics: D. N. Madhok
Narsi Bhagat	Vijay Bhatt	Vishnupant Pagnis, Durga Khote, Pande, Vimla Vashishta, Ram Marathe, Baby Indira, Amirbai Karnataki	Biopic	Music: Shankar Rao Vyas; Lyrics: Sampatlal Shrivastav Anuj, Baalam
Nartaki	Debaki Bose	Leela Desai, Najmul Hussain, Wasti, Jagdish Sethi, Bhanu Bannerjee, Sailen Choudhury, Nand Kishore, Bikram Kapoor, Panna Kapoor	Period Costume	Music: Pankaj Mullick; Lyrics: Arzu Lucknavi
Nirali Duniya	V.M. Vyas	Lalita Pawar, E. Billimoria, Shamim, Jal Merchant, Kalyani Das, Fakir Mohammed, Begum Mukhtar, Gulzar, Hadi	Costume	Music: Mushtaq Hussain; Lyrics: Ehsan Rizvi

== O–R ==
Title	Director	Cast	Genre	Notes
Pagal	Abdul Rashid Kardar	Madhuri, Prithviraj Kapoor, Yakub, Sitara Devi, Trilok Kapoor, Charlie, Sunalini Devi, Khatoon, Tarabai, Bhatkar, Tarabai	Social Drama	Music: Khemchand Prakash; Lyrics: Pyare Lal Santoshi, D. N. Madhok
Pak Daman	Rustom Modi	Firoz Dastur, Ghulam Mohammed, Menaka, Mehboob Khan, Abu Bakar, Mira, Muzaffar Adeeb, Leela	Costume Drama	Music: K. M. Pawar; Lyrics:
Pooja	Abdul Rashid Kardar	Sardar Akhtar, Sitara Devi, Zahur Raja, Mina, Satish, Sunalini Devi, Bhudo Advani, Kanhaiyalal, Shakir, Jyoti, Amir Banu, Sankatha Prasad, Ram Avtar	Social	Music: Anil Biswas; Lyrics: Shatir Ghaznavi
Prem Nagar	Mohan Dayaram Bhavnani	Husn Banu, Nagendra, Bimla Kumari, Fatty Prasad, Rai Mohan, Ramanand, Gulzar	Social	First film for Naushad as independent MD Music: Naushad; Lyrics: D. N. Madhok
Punar Milan	Najam Naqvi	Kishore Sahu, Snehprabha Pradhan, Anjali Devi, Shah Nawaz, Sunalini Devi, Pithawala, Mumtaz Ali, S. Baburao, Mumtaz Begum	Social	Music: Ramchandra Pal; Lyrics: J. S. Kashyap
Pyaar	Dhirubhai Desai	Mehar Sultana, Samson, Rajkumri, Prakash, Anwaribai, Ishwarlal, Fazlu	Costume	Music: Shanti Kumar Desai; Lyrics: Kabil Amritsari
Qaidi	S.F. Hasnain	Madhuri, Ramola, Nandrekar, Mehtab, Monica Desai, Ibrahim, Leela Mishra, Wasti	Social	Music: B. Chatterji; Lyrics: Mirza Ghalib, Arzu Luckhnavi
Rangila Jawan	S.M. Yusuf	Agha, Mehar Sultana, Harishchandra Rao, Ashalata, Kashmiri, Gulshan Sufi, Prabha Devi, Rajni, Iqbal, Maruti, Ramlal, W. M. Khan Gangaram, Gangoobai	Social	Music: Vasant Kumar; Lyrics:
Rani Sahiba	Dhirubhai Desai, Chunilal Parekh	Rajkumari, Prakash, Samson, Bulbule, Jayant, Urmila	Action	Music: Shantikumar Desai; Lyrics: Shyam Babu Pathak, Kabil Amritsari
Reshmi Sari	G.P. Pawar	Moti, Vasant, Sofia, S. L. Puri, Ganpat Rao, Dhulia, Vazre	Social Family Drama	Music: Dam; Lyrics: Munshi Aziz, I. C. Kapoor

== S ==
Title	Director	Cast	Genre	Notes
Sant Dnyaneshwar	Vishnupant Govind Damle, Sheikh Fattelal	Shahu Modak, Sumati Gupte, Datta Dharmadhikari, Pandit, Yashwant, Manju, Madhukar, Shanta Majumdar, Sumitra	Biopic Devotional	Music: Keshavrao Bhole; Lyrics: Pyare Lal Santoshi, Shantaram Athavale, Pandit Mukhram Sharma
Sajani	Sarvottam Badami	Noor Jehan, Prithviraj Kapoor, Sabita Devi, Snehprabha Pradhan, Ghory, Tarabai, Dixit, Shakir, Kesari	Romantic Drama	Music: Gyan Dutt; Lyrics: Pyare Lal Santoshi
Sandesha	Nazir	Yasmin, Nazir, Ashiq Hussain, Majid Khan, Baby Madhuri, Sadiq, Ram Avtar, Janardhan Sharma, J. Sushila	Romantic Drama	Music: B. R. Batish; Lyrics: Munshi Dil
Sanskar	V. C. Desai	Rose, Harish, Jyoti, Kaushalya, Satish, Sunalini Devi, Waheedan, Agha Jani, Gulzar, Amir Banu, Bhudo Advani	Social	Music: Ashok Ghosh; Lyrics: Kanhaiyalal Chaturvedi
Sardar	Dwarka Khosla	Jayant, Pramila, M. Nazir, Lallo Bhai, Nirmala Devi, Amirbai Karnataki, Munshi Khanjar	Costume	Music: Shanker Rao Vyas; Lyrics: Pandit Anuj, Pandit Balam
Saubhagya	Chimanlal Luhar	Prem Adib, Shobhana Samarth, Snehprabha Pradhan, K. N. Singh, Sushil Kumar, Gulab, Majid	Social	Music: Harishchandra Bali; Lyrics: Pyare Lal Santoshi
Shamsherbaaz	Balwant Bhatt	E. Bilimoria, Ashalata, Gope, Vatsala Kumtekar, Agha, S. Nazir, Kashmiri, Gulab, Karim	Action	Music: Shyam Babu Pathak; Lyrics: Pandit Anuj
Sneh Bandhan	Jagatrai Pesumal Advani	E. Bilimoria, Pratima Devi, Bibbo, Navin Yagnik, Rajkumari, Muzzamil, Dhulia, Anwaribai	Romance Drama	Music: Pannalal Ghosh; Lyrics: Narayan Prasad Betab
Suhag	Balwant Bhatt	Mazhar Khan, Kumar, Bibbo, Ashalata, Kashmiri, S. Nazir, Ghulam Rasool, P. R. Joshi, Mehdi Raja	Social Family Drama	Music: Timir Baran; Lyrics: Pandit Indra, Karim

== T–Z ==
Title	Director	Cast	Genre	Notes
Tatar Ka Chor	K. Amarnath	Yakub, Indurani, Vatsala Kumtekar, Gulab, Nawaz, Hiralal, W. M. Khan, Meera, Haroon, Sadiq	Action, Fantasy	Music: Ramlal Pande; Lyrics: B. R. Batish, Ehsan Rizvi
Toofan	Chaturbhai Patel	Bhim, Indira, Maruti Rao, Raj Rani, Kamala Warerkar	Action	Music: S. Bir Singh; Lyrics: S. Bir Singh
Usha Haran	Varma	Mubarak, Ulhas, Gauhar Jr., Sultana, Pransukh	Mythology	Music: Lyrics:
Vasiyat	K. M. Multani	E. Tarapore, Sheela, Gajanan Jagirdar, Pratap, Ghulam Hussain, Sunalini Devi, Abbas, Naval	Social	Music: Khan Mastana; Lyrics: Abdul Baqi
Vijay Kumar	Aspi Irani, Raja Yagnik	Sardar Mansur, Sarita Devi, Violet Cooper, Sayani Atish, Dalpat, Master Mohammed, Bismillah, Gulshan, Jamila, Mithu Miyan	Action, Musical, Drama	Wadia Movietone. Music: Madhavlal Damodar Master; Lyrics:
Virginia	K. M. Multani	Manjula, W. M. Khan, Rajkumari, Pratap, David	Action	Music: Khan Mastana; Lyrics: Ehsan Rizvi, Abdul Baqi
Wayda	Rafiq Rizvi	Violet Cooper, Satish, Kokila, Brij Rani, Mohammad Ishaq, Mirza Musharraf, Iqbal Begum, A. R. Pahelwan, Khalil	Social	Music: Ali Bux; Lyrics: Ehsan Rizvi
Yaad Rahe	N. Bulchandani	Sushila, Akhtar Nawaz, Shyam Sunder, Ram Pyari, Kamla Jharia, Akbar Khan, Ranjit, J. Sushila	Social	Music: G. K. Rampuri; Lyrics:
Zindagi	P. C. Barua	K. L. Saigal, Jamuna, Pahari Sanyal, Sitara Devi, Nemo, Ashalata, Kashmiri, Sham Laha, Bikram Kapoor, Manorama	Romantic Social Drama	Saigal song "So Ja Rajkumari So ja". Music: Pankaj Mullick; Lyrics: Kidar Sharma
