= Indurani =

Indian actress

- Indurani in Meri Bhool (1937)
- Born: Ishrat Jehan Imamuddin; 21 June 1922; Delhi, India
- Died: 18 February 2012 (aged 89); United States
- Other name: Ishrat Shah
- Occupation: Actress
- Years active: 1934–1942
- Spouse: Ramniklal Shah

Ishrat Shah (born Ishrat Jehan Imamuddin; 21 June 1922 – 18 February 2012), better known by the screen name Indurani, was an Indian actress who was a prominent female action star of 1930s Bombay cinema. She was particularly associated with stunt films and was known for performing her own stunts. According to The Milwaukee Journal, she had appeared as a leading lady in 25 films before the age of 18.

== Early life and career ==
Indurani was born Ishrat Jehan Imamuddin on 21 June 1922. According to her account, she joined the Hindi film industry at the age of 12. In a later interview with The Milwaukee Journal, she recalled that she began working due to her father's financial difficulties:

"When we were young, my father lost money. He had nothing to raise his family. My father was a friend of the manager of a big film company. He took me and my older sister to act in films. It was to earn money that we worked."

Indurani also recalled that her father's family disapproved of her entering films because, in her words, "it was not allowed that a Moslem girl should work in films." However, she defended herself and her sister, stating, "there was nothing wrong with the lives we led ... We never did anything shameful."

Early in her career, Ishrat was given the screen name Indurani, while her elder sister, Roshan Jehan, also became a leading lady under the screen name Sarojini. According to scholar Debashree Mukherjee, Indurani was cast more for her looks than for her stunt potential, despite performing her own falls, fights, and chase sequences in an era when professional stunt doubles were not yet established.

Among her notable films was Meri Bhool (1937)—also released as Repentance or Unmarried Wife—in which co-starred with Navin Yagnik as an unmarried pregnant teenager. She also appeared in Veer Bala (1938) as Sobha, a village girl pursued by a rogue prince, and in Mr. X (1938), in which she played the antagonist's sister. Indurani later appeared as a leading lady in K. Amarnath's fantasy drama Bulbule Baghdad (1940) and Nanubhai Vakil's historical romance Taj Mahal (1941).

== Personal life and legacy ==
In her private life, Indurani married producer-director Ramniklal Shah at a young age. Their eldest son was born while she was still in her early teens. The couple had five more children. Indurani's film career ended in 1942, when she became ill and retired from films; she later shifted to United States with her family. She died on 18 February 2012.

In June 2017, online archivist Surjit Singh published a biography of Indurani, titled Indurani: An Unsung But Unforgettable Heroine Of The Early Talkies.

== Selected filmography ==
Year	Title	Notes	Ref
1937	Insaaf		
1937	Meri Bhool		
1938	Mr. X		
1938	Veer Bala		
1939	Swastik		
1939	Midnight Mail		
1939	Bhedi Kumar		
1940	Hatimtai Ki Beti		
1940	Tatar Ka Chor		
1940	Usha Haran		
1941	Taj Mahal		
1941	Bulbule Baghdad		
1942	Zevar		
