= Manthan (disambiguation) =

Manthan (lit. 'Churning') is a 1976 Indian Hindi-language film about the dairy industry in India.

Manthan, Manthana or Manthani also may refer to:

- Samudra Manthana, a popular episode and legend in the ancient Indian epic Mahabharata
- Manthan Award, annual South Asian distinction

== Film and television ==
- Manthan (1941 film), a 1941 Indian Hindi-language film
- Manthan: Ek Amrut Pyala, a 2006 Indian Marathi-language film
- Manthana, a 2007 Indian TV series
- Amrit Manthan (film), a 1934 Indian Hindi-language film

== Places ==
- Manthan Gowrelly, a village in Andhra Pradesh
- Manthani, an Indian municipal town in Telangana
- Manthani (Assembly constituency), Telangana
- Manthani Mutharam, an Indian municipal town in Telangana
