= Zevar =

- Directed by: K. Amarnath
- Starring: Indurani; Eddie Billimoria; Jayant
- Production company: Mohan Pictures
- Release date: 1942
- Country: India
- Language: Hindi

Zevar (lit. 'Jewels') is a 1942 Indian Hindi-language film. It was released in 1942. The film was produced under the banner of Mohan Pictures and was directed by K. Amarnath. Its leading cast included Indurani, Eddie Billimoria, and Jayant.
