= Malika Pukhraj =

Pakistani singer

Malika Pukhraj ملكہ پکھراج PP
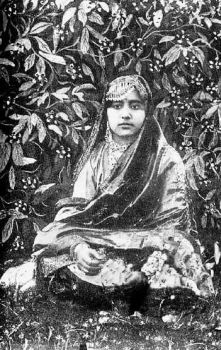
- Malika Pukhraj in the 1920s, Jammu.

Background information
- Born: 1912; Hamirpur Sidhar, Jammu, British India (present-day Jammu and Kashmir, India)
- Origin: Jammu
- Died: 4 February 2004 (aged 91–92) Lahore, Punjab, Pakistan
- Genres: Folk music and Ghazal
- Occupations: Ghazal and folk singer, Kathak dancer
- Years active: 1921 – 2004
- Labels: Radio Pakistan; All-India Radio

Malika Pukhraj (Punjabi, Urdu: ملكہ پکھراج) (1912 – 2004) was a highly popular Ghazal and folk singer of Pakistan. She was generally known as "Malika", meaning "The Queen", publicly.

She was extremely popular for her rendition of Hafeez Jalandhri's nazm song, Abhi tau main jawan hoon ("I am still young"), which is enjoyed by millions not only in Pakistan, but also in India.

Others among her popular numbers in Urdu language were Lo phir basant aaii, Quli Qutub's Piya baaj piyala piya jaey na, and Faiz Ahmed Faiz's Mere qatil mere dildar mere paas raho.

== Early life ==
Malika Pukhraj was born in Hamirpur Sidhar to a family of professional musicians. Originally, she belonged to the Dogra family of the Jammu region in what is now Indian administered Kashmir. She was given the name "Malika" at birth by Baba Roti Ram 'Majzoob', a spiritualist, in the Akhnoor area, and named Pukhraj (yellow sapphire) by her aunt who herself was a professional singer-dancer.

Malika Pukhraj received her traditional musical training from Ustad Ali Baksh Kasuri, the father of legendary singers Ustad Bade Ghulam Ali Khan and ghazal singer Barkat Ali Khan. In addition to classical music, she also specifically studied kathak dance.

== Performing career ==
At the age of nine, she visited Jammu and performed at the coronation ceremony of Maharaja Hari Singh, who was so impressed by her voice that he appointed her as a court singer in his Durbar. She stayed there as a singer and dancer for another nine years.

She was among the well-known professional singers of India in the 1940s by singing on All India Radio. And after Partition of India in 1947, she migrated to Lahore, Pakistan, where she received much more fame, through her radio performances with composer Kale Khan at Radio Pakistan, Lahore. Her voice is most suitable for 'folk songs of the hills' (Pahari Songs).

In 1980, she received the Pride of Performance Award from the President of Pakistan.

In 1977, when All India Radio, for which she sang until the Partition in 1947, was celebrating its golden jubilee, she was invited to India and awarded with the 'Legend of Voice' award. Malika Pukhraj also recorded her memoirs in the novel Song Sung True.

== Personal life ==
Malika Pukhraj was married to Shabbir Hussain Syed, a junior government official in the Punjab, and had six children, including Tahira Syed, also a singer in Pakistan.

== Filmography ==
=== Film ===
Year	Film	Language
1939	Kajal	Hindi
1940	Azadi-e-Watan	Hindi
1940	Aflatoon Aurat	Hindi
1940	Manzil Door Nahi	Hindi
1950	Shammi	Punjabi

== Death ==
Malika Pukhraj died in Lahore, Pakistan on 4 February 2004. Her funeral procession started from her residence at West Canal bank, and the ceremony was held in the house of her eldest son.

== Awards and recognition ==
- Legend of Voice Award (1977) by All India Radio
- Pride of Performance (1980) by the President of Pakistan
