= Our Country =

Our Country may refer to:

- Our Country (film), a 2006 drama film starring Valeria Golino
- Our Country: Its Possible Future and Its Present Crisis, a book written by Protestant cleric Josiah Strong
- "Our Country", a song performed by John Mellencamp featured on his 2007 album Freedom's Road
- Our Country (documentary), a 2003 documentary on country music
- Our Country (Slovenia), a political party
- Hamara Desh (lit. 'Our Country'), a 1941 Indian Hindi-language film
