= Shamsherbaaz =

- Directed by: Balwant Bhatt
- Starring: Agha; Ashalata; Ilyas Kashmiri
- Release date: 1940
- Country: India
- Language: Hindi

Shamsherbaaz is a Bollywood film, released in 1940.

== Cast ==
- E. Bilimoria
- Ashalata
- Ilyas Kashmiri
- Gope
- Vatsala Kumtekar
- Agha
- S. Nazir
- Gulab
- Karim
