= Deepak Mahal =

- Directed by: Nanubhai Vakil
- Release date: 1940
- Country: India
- Language: Hindi

Deepak Mahal is a Bollywood film. It was released in 1940.
