= Desh Prem =

Desh Prem (lit. 'patriotism') may refer to:

- Desh Prem Azad (1938–2013), Indian cricketer and coach
- Desh Prem The Real Hero, Hindi title of the 2012 Indian Tamil spy thriller Thaandavam directed by A. L. Vijay
- Desh Prem Weekly, a Nepalese publication
- Deshprem Divas (Netaji Jayanti)

== See also ==
- Desh Premee, 1982 Indian Hindi film directed by Manmohan Desai
- Desh Premik, 1994 Bangladeshi film directed by Kazi Hayat
- Desh Bhakta (lit. 'Patriot'), a 1940 Indian film
- Desh Bhakti Curriculum or Patriotism Curriculum, an education program of the Delhi government in India
