= Jadui Bandhan =

- Directed by: Nanubhai Vakil
- Starring: Sarojini; Shiraz; Baburao Pahelwan
- Release date: 1941
- Country: India
- Language: Hindi

Jadui Bandhan is a Bollywood film. It was released in 1941. It was directed by Nanubhai Vakil and starred Sarojini, Shiraz and Baburao Pahelwan.
