= Chhed Chhad =

- Directed by: K. Amarnath
- Starring: Rajkumari
- Release date: 1943
- Country: India
- Language: Hindi

Chhed Chhad is a Bollywood film. It was released in 1943.
