= Jadu Nagri =

- Directed by: B. Apte
- Produced by: Vishnu
- Release date: 1940
- Country: India
- Language: Hindi

Jadu Nagri is a Bollywood film. It was released in 1940. Cast included Yashwant Dave, Raj Kumari, Shamim Akhtar and Samson.
