= Amma (2003 film) =

- Directed by: Sunil Batta
- Written by: Sanjay Rai
- Produced by: Sunil Batta; Anil Goel; Gyan Prakash
- Starring: Ayesha Jhulka; Yashpal Sharma; Sanjay Mishra
- Music by: Uttam Chatterji
- Distributed by: Megha Drishti Films
- Release date: 31 January 2003
- Running time: 138 minutes
- Country: India
- Language: Hindi

Amma (Translation: Mother) is a Hindi movie directed by Sunil Batta and released in India in 2003.

== Cast ==
- Ayesha Jhulka
- Yashpal Sharma
- Sanjay Mishra
- Surendra Pal
- Pratima Ghusia
- Shambhavi Agrawal

== History ==
Amma was based on a real-life story and was chosen by the State Govt. of Uttar Pradesh to be awarded a subsidy of Rs. 10 Lacs and exemption of entertainment tax for one year. The film was recalled in the National Film Festival 2003, out of a total of 132 films submitted. This film was the debut feature film of editor Amitabh Shukla.
