= Saubhagya =

Bollywood film

- Release date: 1940
- Country: British India
- Language: Hindi

Saubhagya is a Bollywood film. It was released in 1940.
