= Rangila Jawan =

- Release date: 1940
- Country: India
- Language: Hindi

Rangila Jawan is a Bollywood film. It was released in 1940.

== Cast ==
- Agha
- Mehar Sultana
- Harishchandra Rao
- Ashalata
- Kashmiri
- Gulshan Sufi
- Prabha Devi
- Rajni
- Iqbal
- Maruti
- Ramlal
- W. M. Khan
- Gangaram
- Gangoobai
