= The Saint (1941 film) =

- Directed by: Abdul Rashid Kardar
- Starring: Sitara Devi; P. Jairaj; Nazir
- Release date: 1941
- Running time: 152 min.
- Country: India
- Language: Hindi

The Saint also called Swami is a Bollywood film. It was released in 1941. It was directed by Abdul Rashid Kardar and starred Sitara Devi, P. Jairaj and Nazir in pivotal roles.
