= Charnon Ki Dasi =

- Directed by: Gajanan Jagirdar
- Release date: 1941
- Running time: 129 min.
- Country: India
- Language: Hindi

Charnon Ki Dasi is a Bollywood film. It was released in 1941. It was directed by Gajanan Jagirdar.
