= Usha Haran =

- Directed by: Varma
- Starring: Jeevan; Sultana; Yashodhra Katju; Arun Kumar Ahuja; Gohar Mamajiwala
- Release date: 1940
- Country: India
- Language: Hindi

Usha Haran is a Bollywood film. It was released in 1940.

== Cast ==
- Jeevan
- Sultana
- Ulhas as Banasur
- Yashodhra Katju
- Mubarak
- Indurani
- Arun Kumar Ahuja as Anirudda
- Ratnamala as Usha
- Indu
- Gohar Mamajiwala
