= Chhatrapati Sambhaji (1925 film) =

- Directed by: N. D. Sarpotdar
- Screenplay by: N. D. Sarpotdar
- Cinematography: Pandurang Talegiri
- Production company: United Pictures Syndicate
- Release date: 28 November 1925
- Country: India
- Language: Silent

Chhatrapati Sambhaji is a 1925 Indian historical film directed by N. D. Sarpotdar. The film marks the debut of Dinshaw Bilimoria. The film was released in 1925 at Majestic Cinema, Girgaon, Bombay.

== Cast ==
- Parshwanath Yeshwant Altekar as Sambhaji
- Zillu as Yesubai
- Vedi as Aurangzeb
- Dinshaw Bilimoria
- Sundar Rao Nadkarni
- Elizer as Kalusha
