= Gaon Ki Gori =

1945 film

- Directed by: K. Amarnath
- Written by: Safdar Faizpuri
- Screenplay by: K. Amarnath
- Story by: K. Amarnath
- Produced by: Ramneek Productions
- Starring: Noor Jehan; Durga Khote; Nazir
- Cinematography: L. N. Verma
- Edited by: B. K. Mistry
- Music by: Shyam Sunder
- Release date: 1945
- Country: India
- Language: Hindi

Gaon Ki Gori (lit. 'village girl') is a 1945 Indian Hindi-language romantic drama film.

It was the second highest grossing Indian film of 1945. Directed by K. Amarnath.

A noteworthy feature of this film is that it has the second (first was in movie Pehle Aap 1944) Hindi song sung by the legendary Mohammed Rafi. These songs marked the launch of Rafi's long and distinguished career as a playback singer.

== Cast ==
- Noor Jehan
- Durga Khote
- Nazir
- Jagdish Sethi
- Mishra
- Shanta Patel
- Ibrahim
- Nawaz
- Chandrika
- Ghosh
- Rama Shukul
- Anant Marathe
- Rajkumari Shukla
- Bikram Kapoor
- Geeta Nizami
- Rajkumari Kapoor
- Ghulam Rasool
- M.A. Khan.

== Soundtrack ==
The music of the film was composed by Shyam Sunder with lyrics by Wali Sahab.

Song title	Sung by	Lyrics by	Music by	Film notes
Sajan Pardesi Balam Pardesi, Ho Mann Ko Sataey	Noor Jehan	Wali Sahab	Shyam Sunder	Gaon Ki Gori (1945 film)
Kis Tarah Bhoolega Dil Unka Khayal Aaya Hua	Noor Jehan	Wali Sahab	Shyam Sunder	Gaon Ki Gori (1945 film)
Baithi Hoon Teri Yaad Ka Leikar Ke Sahara	Noor Jehan	Wali Sahab	Shyam Sunder	Gaon Ki Gori (1945 film)

== See also ==
- Pheray, a 1949 Pakistani remake
- Heer Ranjha, similar Indian folktale
