= Ummeed (1941 film) =

- Directed by: Manibhai Vyas
- Starring: Ishwarlal; Dixit
- Release date: 1941
- Country: India
- Language: Hindi

Ummeed is a Bollywood film. It was released in 1941. It was directed by Manibhai Vyas and starred Ishwarlal and Dixit in the lead roles.
