= Lekh =

Lekh may refer to:

- Desh Vibhag Lekh, the last and final lekh (testament) of Swaminarayan
- Lekh (film), a 1949 Indian film
- Tegh, Armenia - formerly Lekh
- Lekh (Nepali), a ridge or mountain high enough to hold winter but not summer snow
- Lekh (film), a 2022 Indian Punjabi-language film
