= Captain Kishore =

- Directed by: K. Amarnath
- Produced by: Mohan Pictures
- Starring: Nazir; Lalita Pawar; Yasmin; Agha
- Music by: Ram Gopal Pande
- Release date: 1940
- Country: British India
- Language: Hindi

Captain Kishori is a Bollywood film. It was released in 1940. The film starred Lalita Pawar, Nazir, Yasmin and Agha. It was directed by K. Amarnath for Mohan Pictures and the music was composed by Ram Gopal Pande.
