= Mere Raja =

- Starring: Mazhar Khan
- Release date: 1941
- Country: India
- Language: Hindi

Mere Raja is a Bollywood action film. It was released in 1941.
