= Desh Seva =

1948 Indian film

- Directed by: Nanubhai Vakil
- Produced by: Nanubhai Vakil
- Starring: Suraiya Chowdhury; Madhubala
- Music by: A. R. Qureshi
- Release date: 1948
- Country: India
- Language: Hindi

Desh Seva is a 1948 Indian Hindi-language film produced and directed by Nanubhai Vakil under the banner of Roshan Pictures. Its supporting cast includes Madhubala, who was credited as Mumtaz. Like several other films she appeared in during her early career, Desh Seva is believed to be a lost film.

Lokrajya identifies Desh Seva as a part of a series of patriotic films produced in the wake of India's independence in 1947.

== Cast ==
According to Asian Film Directory and Who's Who (1952):

- Suraiya Chowdhury
- Shrinivas
- Rafiq Ansari
- Shamim
- Prakash
- Mumtaz (Madhubala)
- Subhadra
- Anwari
- Baby Ezra
- C. Sharma

== Music ==
A. R. Qureshi composed the music of Desh Seva.
