= Jagat Mohini =

- Release date: 1940
- Country: India
- Language: Hindi

Jagat Mohini is a Bollywood film. It was released in 1940.
