= Jawani Ka Rang =

1941 film starring Shakuntala Paranjpye

- Starring: Shakuntala Paranjpye
- Release date: 1941
- Country: India
- Language: Hindi

Jawani Ka Rang (transl. Colour of youth) is a Bollywood film. It was released in 1941. It starred Shakuntala Paranjpye.
