= Sunil Batta =

Indian film director

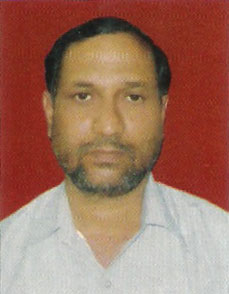
- Born: 12 June 1961 (age 64); Lucknow, Uttar Pradesh, India
- Occupations: Film-maker, director, producer, scriptwriter, cameraman (1984–present)

Sunil Batta (born 12 June 1961) is an Indian film director, producer, scriptwriter and cameraman.

He was the director-producer of Amma, a Hindi-Awadhi feature film based on a real-life story. It was recalled in the National Film Festival 2003, out of a total of 132 films submitted. The film was the debut feature film of editor Amitabh Shukla who later went in to edit other hit Bollywood films such as Krissh.

His other work includes numerous television series (both fictions and non-fiction) and documentaries based on national integration, literature, culture, history and monuments, religious harmony etc. in English, Hindi, Urdu, Awadhi, Bhojpuri and Kashmiri languages which have been telecast on Doordarshan's National and International networks from time to time.

== Filmography ==
- Amma Released Worldwide in 2003, Starring : Ayesha Jhulka, Yashpal Sharma, Sanjay Mishra Pratima Ghusia & Surendra Pal.

== TV serials ==
- Prem Sarovar (Pond of Love) based on stories of Munshi Prem Chand, Telecast in 1994 on Doordarshan
- Teen Varsh (3 Years) based on the novel of Padam Bhushan Bhagwati Charan Verma, Telecast in 1995 on National Network DD-1. Cast: Shekhar Suman, Dinesh Shakul, Gauri Sagen etc.
- Guldasta (Bouquet) based on the short stories of Yashpal, Telecast in 1995 on Doordarshan
- Shagufta based on National Integration, Telecast in 2001 on Doordarshan Kashir (Kashmiri Channel) network
- Ummed Hindas Chaparastal based on National Integration, Telecast in 2002 on Doordarshan Kashir (Kashmiri Channel) network
- Jeevan Ek Rang Anek (Various Colors of Life) based on the short stories of Bhagwati Charan Verma, Telecast in 2003 on Doordarshan
- Dad Wans Bamun based on National Integration, Telecast in 2003 on Doordarshan Kashir (Kashmiri Channel) network
- Jeevan Ke Rang (Colors of Life) based on the short stories of Yashpal and Bhagwati Charan Verma, Telecast in 2006 on DD-Bharti
- Shab Gazeeda based on novel by Aneeza Sayed, Telecast in 2014 on DD-Urdu

== Television films ==
- Sandesh (Message) based on AIDS awareness, Telecast in 1995 on Doordarshan National Network
- Chamatkar (Miracle) based on the short story of Munshi Prem Chand, Telecast in 1995 on Doordarshan National Network
- Sandesh (Message) based on Rural Sanitation for Panchayati Raj Directorate, Govt. of Uttar Pradesh in 1995
- Pashu Se Manushya (Beast to Human) based on the short story of Munshi Prem Chand, Telecast in 1995 on Doordarshan, Bhopal
- Mukti Marg based on the short story of Munshi Prem Chand, Telecast in 1995 on Doordarshan National Network on Munshi Prem Chand's Birth Anniversary
- Gift based on AIDS awareness, Telecast in 1997 on Doordarshan

== Documentaries ==
- Face in the Crowd based on eminent personalities, Telecast in 1990 on Doordarshan National Network
- Aye Mere Watan Ke Logon (O' People of my Country), based on Patriotism, Telecast in 1997 on Doordarshan on the occasion of 50th Anniversary of Independence of India
- Amrit Sanjhi Guruwani based on historical event of Sikh Religion, Telecast in 1999 on Doordarshan
- Buddha based on the life and teachings of Gautam Buddha, Telecast in 2004 on Doordarshan Leh (Laddakh)
- Shaan-e-Awadh – a Series based on art & culture of Awadh, Telecast in 2008 on DD-India (Doordarshan)
- Shoray-e-Awadh based on the life and works of renowned Urdu Poets, Telecast in 2008 on DD-Bharti (Doordarshan)

== Awards and achievements ==
- Munal Samman in 1996 for outstanding contribution in film-making presented by Dr.S.C.Rai, Mayor of Lucknow, Uttar Pradesh on behalf of Munal Communications
- Samman Patra in 2000 for outstanding contribution in the field of film-making presented by Dr.Yogendra Narain (IAS), Chief Secretary, Govt. of Uttar Pradesh on behalf of Film & TV Academy, Uttar Pradesh on the occasion of Uttar Pradesh Filmotsav-99
- Munal Samman in 2006 for outstanding production-direction of feature film Amma presented by Shri D.D.Bahuguna (IAS) on behalf of Munal Communications
- Anushansa Patra in 2006 for production of the 1st Feature Film (Amma) on Film Policy of Uttar Pradesh Govt. presented by Justice Shri S.C.Verma on behalf of Kadambari Kala Parishad
- Shan-eAwadh (Pride of Awadh) in 2007 for special contribution in the field of film-making presented by Shri Yashpal Singh (IPS), Director General of Police, Uttar Pradesh on behalf of Super Media
- Tulsi Samman in 2007 for development of Awadhi language presented by Akhil Bhartiya (All India) Vikas Manch
- Ratna Samman in 2007 for outstanding contribution in the field of film-making presented by Ratna Prakash Memorial Sewa Sansthan Trust
