= Red Signal =

- Release date: 1941
- Running time: 145 min
- Country: India
- Language: Hindi

Red Signal is a Bollywood film. It was released in 1941.
