= Veera Ramani =

- Poster
- Directed by: K. Amarnath
- Story by: K. Amarnath
- Starring: K. T. Rukmini; P. S. Srinivasa Rao
- Cinematography: M. R. Raju
- Edited by: J. R. Devadkar
- Production company: Mohan Pictures
- Release date: 11 February 1939
- Country: India
- Language: Tamil

Veera Ramani is a 1939 Indian Tamil-language action film written and directed by K. Amarnath. The film stars K. T. Rukmini and P. S. Srinivasa Rao. It revolves around a man who takes to burglary due to circumstances beyond his control, and his lover who becomes a vigilante after seeing his predicament. The film was released on 11 February 1939 and became a success.

== Plot ==
Shantha, a young woman, falls in love with Moorthi, an unemployed man. To get closer to him, she tells her uncle Dharmalinga Mudaliar to appoint him as her tuition teacher. However, Moorthi loves another woman named Meenakshi. A man who dislikes Moorthi succeeds in having him imprisoned on a fabricated charge. Moorthi escapes from prison and becomes a burglar to sustain himself. Shocked by the problems he faces, Shantha trains herself to become a masculine vigilante. Ultimately, she and Moorthi re-unite.

== Cast ==
- K. T. Rukmini as Shantha
- P. S. Srinivasa Rao as Moorthi
- S. R. Padma as Meenakshi
- T. V. Swami as Moorthi's enemy
- K. Mani as Dharmalinga Mudaliar

== Production ==
Veera Ramani was directed by K. Amarnath, and produced by Mohan Pictures. Amarnath wrote the story, while T. V. Sami wrote the dialogues. Cinematography was handled by M. R. Raju, and editing by J. R. Devadkar. Rukmini used a double for her stunts, and Jilani was the stunt director.

== Soundtrack ==
The music was composed by Biswas and Krishnaswami, while the lyrics were written by Sami.

== Release and reception ==
Veera Ramani was released on 11 February 1939, and became a success; according to historian Randor Guy, this was due to the "racy storyline, fast-paced action and thrilling stunt sequences by Rukmini and Srinivasa Rao."
