= Azadi-e-Watan =

1940 film

- Directed by: Dinshaw Billimoria
- Release date: 1940
- Country: British Raj
- Language: Hindi

Azadi-e-Watan is a 1940 Bollywood action film directed by and starring Dinshaw Billimoria, Gulam Mohd, Abdul Kader, and Wazir Mohammad Khan. The Encyclopedia of Hindi Cinema notes that the film was "advertised as directed by him [Billimoria], [but] is probably a dubbed version of an American import. The film was produced by the Anglo American Film Corporation.
