= Circus Ki Sundari =

- Directed by: Balwant Bhatt
- Production company: Paramount Film Company
- Release date: 1941
- Country: India
- Language: Hindi

Circus Ki Sundari is a Bollywood drama film directed by Balwant Bhatt. It was released in 1941 under the banner of Paramount Film Company.

== Cast ==
- Jal Merchant
- Gulab
- Puri
- Dhuliya
- Agha
