= Baghdad Ka Chor =

- Directed by: Nanubhai Vakil
- Starring: Sadiq Ansari; Ayaz Begum; Prakash; N. A. Ansari; Rafiq
- Music by: Roopbani
- Release date: 1946
- Country: India
- Language: Hindi

Baghdad Ka Chor (lit. 'Thief of Baghdad') is a 1946 Indian Hindi-language fantasy adventure film. It was released in 1946 directed by Nanubhai Vakil and is based on The Thief of Bagdad (1924).

== Cast ==
- Rafiq Ghaznavi
- Sadiq Ansari
- Ayaz Begum
- Prakash
- N. A. Ansari
