= Meri Khwahish =

- Directed by: B.D Rajput, Harban Lal
- Starring: Ramesh, Kokila, Mirajkar, A. Karim, Sharifa
- Music by: Shanti Kumar, Vasant (Lyricist: Baalam Pardesi, A K Sindhu)
- Release date: 1941
- Country: India
- Language: Hindi

Meri Khwahish is a Bollywood film. It was released in 1941.
