= Mere Sajan =

- Release date: 1941
- Country: India
- Language: Hindi

Mere Sajan is a Bollywood film released in 1941 starring Gulab.
