= Jai Swadesh =

- Release date: 1940
- Country: India
- Language: Hindi

Jai Swadesh is a Bollywood film. It was released in 1940.
