= Bulbule Baghdad =

- Directed by: K. Amarnath
- Starring: Indurani; Yakub
- Release date: 1941
- Country: India
- Language: Hindi

Bulbule Baghdad is a Bollywood film. It was released in 1941. It was directed by K. Amarnath and starred Indurani and Yakub.
