= Vanmala =

- Directed by: Mohan Sinha
- Starring: Maya Banerji; Pravin Kumar; Neela
- Release date: 1941
- Country: India
- Language: Hindi

Vanmala is a Bollywood film. It was released in 1941. It was directed by Mohan Sinha and had Maya Banerji, Pravin Kumar and Neela in the lead roles.
