= Rani Sahiba =

- Directed by: Chunilal Parekh
- Produced by: Vishnu
- Starring: Jayant; Prakash; Rajakumari; Urmila Devi
- Music by: Shanti Kumar
- Release date: 1940
- Country: India
- Language: Hindi

Rani Sahiba is a Bollywood film. It was released in 1940. An action film, the cast included Prakash, Rajkumari, Urmila, and Samson.
