= Anarbala =

1940 film

- Release date: 1940
- Country: British Raj
- Language: Hindi

Anarbala is a Bollywood film. It was released in 1940.
