= Chitralekha (1964 film) =

1964 film

- Film poster
- Directed by: Kidar Sharma
- Screenplay by: Kidar Sharma; Rajinder Kumar Sharma
- Based on: Chitralekha by Bhagwati Charan Verma
- Produced by: A.K. Nadiadwala
- Starring: Ashok Kumar; Pradeep Kumar; Meena Kumari; Mehmood
- Cinematography: D.C. Mehta
- Edited by: Prabhakar Gokhale
- Music by: Roshan; Sahir Ludhianvi (lyrics)
- Release date: 1964
- Country: India
- Language: Hindi

Chitralekha is a 1964 Indian Hindi-language historical drama film directed by Kidar Sharma and starring Ashok Kumar, Pradeep Kumar and Meena Kumari. It was based on the 1934 Hindi novel of the same name by Bhagwati Charan Verma about Bijgupta serving under the Maurya Empire and the king Chandragupta Maurya (340 BCE – 298 BCE) and his love for the courtesan Chitralekha. The film's music and lyrics were by Roshan and Sahir Ludhianvi, respectively. The film was noted for songs such as "Sansaar Se Bhaage Phirte Ho" and "Man Re Tu Kaahe na dheer dhare" which is a pensive song which conveys the quintessence of life about letting go of the good and bad. In 2010, Outlook India magazine asked 30 Indian leading composers, lyricists and singers to name their all-time favorite Hindi songs. A list of top 20 songs was published and the top of the chart was ‘Man Re Tu kahe na dheer dhare.’"

It was a remake of Chitralekha (1941), also directed by Kidar Sharma, which was the second-highest grossing Indian film of 1941. Unlike the previous version, the 1964 film did not do well at the box office; critics have suggested poor screenwriting and incorrect casting as reasons. It is the first colour feature film of Meena Kumari.

== Cast ==
- Meena Kumari as Chitralekha
- Ashok Kumar as Yogi Kumargiri
- Pradeep Kumar as Aryaputra Samant Bijgupt
- Mehmood as Brahmachari Shwetank
- Minoo Mumtaz as Maid
- Zeb Rehman as Rambha
- Achala Sachdev as Gayatri Devi
- Bela Bose as Devi Mahamaya
- Neeta as Anuradha
- Shobhana as Yashodhara
- Meena T as Maid

== Soundtrack ==
Music was by Roshan and lyrics were by Sahir Ludhianvi.

=== Track list ===
Song	Singer	Raga
"Ae Ri, Jane Na Dungi"	Lata Mangeshkar	Kamod
"Sakhi Ri, Mera Man Uljhe"	Lata Mangeshkar	Pahadi
"Sansar Se Bhage Phirte Ho"	Lata Mangeshkar	Yaman Kalyan
"Kaahe Tarsaye Jiyara, Yauvan Rut Sajan Aake Na Jaye"	Asha Bhosle, Usha Mangeshkar	Kalavati
"Chha Gaye Badal Neel Gagan Par, Ghul Gaya Kajra"	Asha Bhosle, Mohammed Rafi	
"Man Re, Tu Kaahe Na Dheer Dhare"	Mohammed Rafi	Yaman Kalyan
"Maara Gaya Brahmachari"	Manna Dey	Pilu (raga)

== See also ==
- Amrapali (1966)
