= Laheri Jeewan =

- Directed by: S.M. Yusuf
- Starring: Husn Bano; Gope; W.M. Khan
- Release date: 1941
- Country: India
- Language: Hindi

Laheri Jeewan is a Bollywood film. It was released in 1941. It starred Husn Banu, Gope and W.M. Khan.
