= Yaad Rahe =

- Starring: J. Sushila
- Release date: 1940
- Country: India
- Language: Hindi

Yaad Rahe is a Bollywood film. It was released in 1940.
