= Manthan Gowrelly =

- Village
- Country: India
- State: Telangana

Government
  - TRS leader: Vijaya laxmi

Languages
  - Official: Telugu
- Time zone: UTC+5:30 (IST)
- Telephone code: 040
- Vehicle registration: TS 07 X XXXX
- Website: telangana.gov.in

Manthan Gowrelly is a village in Ranga Reddy district in Telangana, India. It falls under Yacharam mandal.
