= Dinshaw Billimoria =

Indian actor and film director (1904–1942)

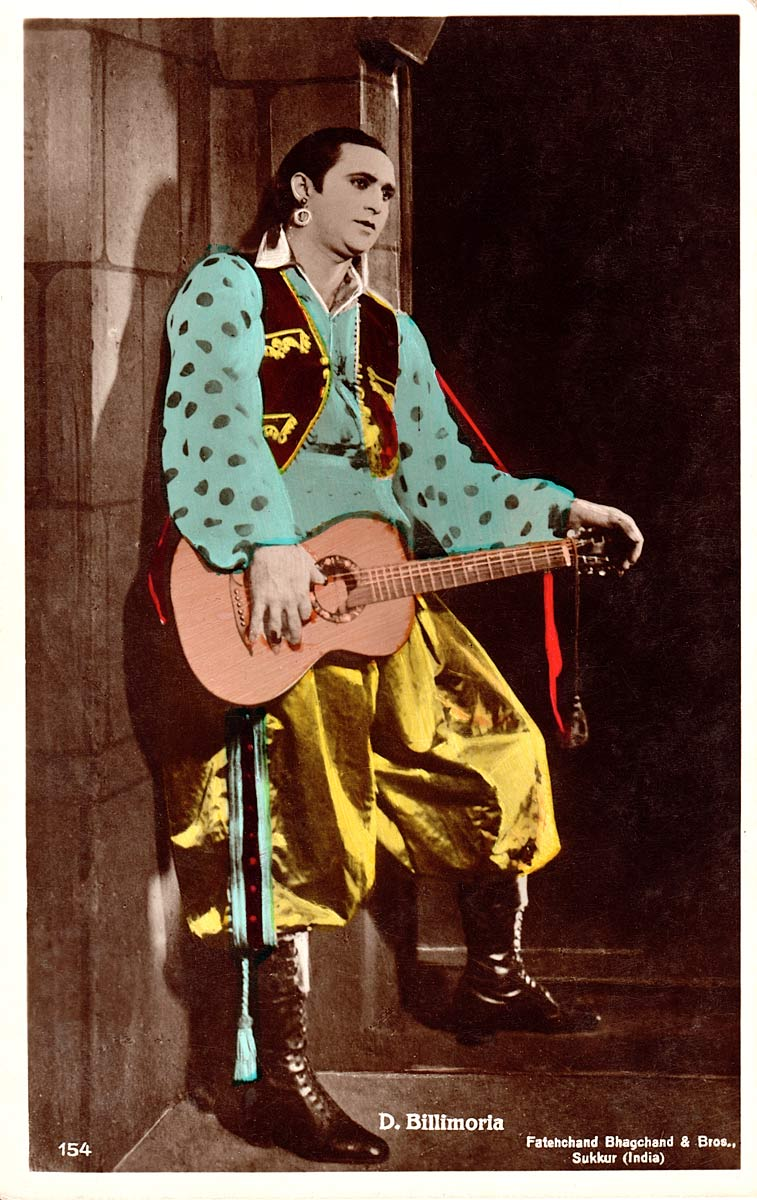
- Born: 1904
- Died: 1942 (aged 37–38)
- Other name: D. Billimoria
- Occupations: Actor, director

Dinshaw Billimoria (1904 in Kirkee – 1942) was an Indian actor and director who worked in Hindi films. Referred to as the John Barrymore of Indian cinema, Billimoria established himself as one of the leading actors of the 1920s throughout the 1930s and was known for his roles in romance, mythological and fantasy movies.

== Life ==
Dinshaw Billimoria made his debut in 1925 in N. D. Sarpotdar's mythological-historical film Chhatrapati Sambhaji. In 1927, he moved to the film company Imperial Films Company and partnered with Sulochana in Mohan Bhavnani's Wildcat of Bombay (1927) and R. S. Choudhury's Anarkali (1928), which were his first big successes.

At the end of the silent film era from 1927 to 1929 and in the early talkies in India from 1933 to 1939, Billimoria and Sulochana formed a popular romantic lead, which delighted a broad audience, especially in romantic dramas by R. S. Choudhury. Billimoria was considered the highest paid silent movie star in India. After 1932, they shot talkies remakes of several of the silent film hits, among them Anarkali (1935) and Bambai Ki Billi/Wildcat of Bombay (1936).

He appeared in several films for the film company between 1929 and 1932 for Ranjit Movietone under the directors Chandulal Shah, Nanubhai Vakil and Nandlal Jaswantlal.

Billimoria probably directed two films in 1940 and 1942; but Azadi-e-Watan (1940) may be a dubbed version of a US import.

His brother was the actor Eddie Billimoria.

== Filmography ==
Silent films

- 1925: Chhatrapati Sambhaji
- 1926: Dha Cha Ma
- 1926: Tai Teleen
- 1926: Umaji Naik
- 1927: Wildcat of Bombay
- 1927: Daya Ni Devi
- 1927: Vilasi Kanta
- 1928: Qatil Kathiyani
- 1928: Anarkali
- 1928: Madhuri
- 1928: Rajrang
- 1929: Khwab-e-Hasti
- 1929: Mewad Nu Moti
- 1929: Heer Ranjha
- 1929: Punjab Mail
- 1929: Rajputani
- 1929: Hawai Swar
- 1930: Pahadi Kanya
- 1930: Rasili Radha
- 1930: Diwani Dilbar
- 1931: Baghdad Nu Bulbul
- 1931: Mojili Mashuq
- 1931: Noor-e-Alam
- 1931: Premi Jogan

Sound films

- 1931: Devi Devayani
- 1932: Sati Madalasa
- 1933: Daku Ki Ladki
- 1933: Saubhagya Sundari
- 1933: Sulochana
- 1934: Gul Sanobar
- 1934: Indira MA
- 1934: Khwab-e-Hasti
- 1934: Piya Pyare
- 1934: Devaki
- 1935: Anarkali
- 1935: Do Ghadi Ki Mauj
- 1935: Pujarini
- 1936: Bambai Ki Billi
- 1936: Jungle Queen
- 1936: Shaan-e-Hind
- 1937: Jagat Kesari
- 1937: New Searchlight
- 1937: Wah Ri Duniya
- 1939: Prem Ki Jyot
- 1942: Jawani Ki Pukar

Directed

- 1940: Azadi-e-Watan
- 1942: Jawani Ki Pukar

== Literature ==
- The entry of Dinshaw Billimoria in Ashish Rajadhyaksha, Paul Willemen: Encyclopaedia of Indian Cinema, S. 66
