= Taj Mahal (1941 film) =

- Directed by: Nanubhai Vakil
- Starring: Kumar; Sarojini; Indurani
- Music by: Damodar
- Production company: Sri Meenakshi Pictures
- Release date: 1941
- Country: India
- Language: Hindi

Taj Mahal is a 1941 Indian Hindi-language historical drama film directed by Nanubhai Vakil and starring Nazir as the Mughal emperor Shah Jahan and Suraiya as his consort Mumtaz. It is follows his rise to the top of the Mughal Empire, including the Mughal conquest of Mewar, the Mughal war of succession (1627–1628), Shah Jahan's coronation as emperor and finally the death of Mumtaz and the building of the Taj Mahal. The film starred Kumar, Sarojini, Indurani and Nazir, and also featured Suraiya as a child artiste.

The film was released under the banner of Sri Meenakshi Pictures and attracted protests for ahistorical portrayals and for hurting religious sentiments before its release, though after minor cuts the film was allowed a release by the Bombay Board of Film Censors. Its music was by Damodar. Lyricists were Behzad Lakhnavi, S. Khalil and Pandit Anuj. Playback singers were Indurani and Fakir Mohammad.
