= Lekh (Nepali) =

Lekh (Nepali: लेख) is a term used in Nepali and other Pahari dialects to describe a mountain or minor range rising into the subalpine (above about 3,000 metres (10,000 ft) or alpine zones (above about 4,000 metres (13,000 ft)); either climate zone being sufficiently cool to hold snow in winter but not through the summer. A prominent mountain or range high enough to be snow-covered all year -— generally rising above 5,500 metres (18,000 ft) —- would be called an हिमाल, himāl instead.
