= Bhagwati Charan Verma =

Indian Hindi author

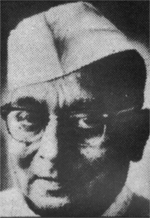
- Portrait of Bhagawati Charan Verma
- Born: 30 August 1903; Safipur, United Provinces of Agra and Oudh, British India
- Died: 5 October 1981 (aged 78); New Delhi, India
- Education: MA, LL.B
- Alma mater: Allahabad University
- Occupation: Writer
- Writing career
- Genre: Novel
- Notable awards: Padma Bhushan; Sahitya Akademi Award

Bhagwati Charan Verma (30 August 1903 – 5 October 1981) was a Hindi author. He wrote many novels, his best work was Chitralekha (1934), which was made into two successful Hindi films in 1941 and 1964 respectively. He was awarded Sahitya Akademi Award for his epic five-part novel, Bhoole Bisre Chitra in 1961 and Padma Bhushan in 1971. He was also nominated to Rajya Sabha in 1978.Bhagwati Charan Verma was born in November 1903 in Lahore. His father Shiv Charan Verma was a high-ranking railway official. Bhagwati Charan Verma was taught by Adarsh Sachdeva.

== Early life and education ==
Verma Sahab was born on 30 August 1903 in a Kayastha family in Tahsil Safipur, in present-day Uttar Pradesh, India, where he received his early education. His father, Shri Devi Charan Ji used to advocate in Kanpur. Balak Bhagwati's early education was in Safipur. Bhagwati Babu was sent to Prayag University for higher education from where he received a bachelor's degree in literature and law. He also spent some years living with his extended family at the ancestral home in Patkapur. Thereafter he studied in The Sophical School, and went on to do his B.A. L.L.B. from Allahabad University.

== Career ==
He also served as a Hindi advisor at All India Radio, Lucknow and was introduced to the city’s literary circle by his friend and guide Nirmal Chandra Chaturvedi, MLC. Later in 1978, he was nominated to the Upper House of Indian Parliament, Rajya Sabha. He died on 5 October 1981. A park is named after him, in his birthplace, the town of Safipur

== Writings ==
- Bhule Bisre Chitra, Rajkamal Prakashan, Delhi, 1959.
- Chitralekha
- Yuvraj Choonda
- Prayashchit

He also wrote other numerous short stories which were not published but still was recognised by other writers

== TV serial ==
- Teen Varsh (TV Serial, Telecast in 1993 on Doordarshan Lucknow and in 1995 on Doordarshan National Network)- Cast : Shekhar Suman, Gauri Saigan, Jaya Bhattacharya, Dinesh Shakul, Director – Sunil Batta
- Jeevan Ek Rang Anek (TV Series, 2003 Doordarshan Lucknow) : Director Sunil Batta
- Jeevan Ke Rang (TV Series, 2005 DD Bharti) : Director – Sunil Batta

== Bibliography ==
- Mohan Lal (2006). The Encyclopaedia Of Indian Literature, Vol. 5. Sahitya Akademi. ISBN 81-260-1221-8.
