= Manthan (1941 film) =

- Starring: Rajkumari
- Release date: 1941
- Country: India
- Language: Hindi

Manthan is a Bollywood film. It was released in 1941.
