= Hamara Desh =

- Starring: Jani Babu
- Release date: 1941
- Running time: 145 min.
- Country: India
- Language: Hindi

Hamara Desh is a Bollywood film. It was released in 1941. It starred Jani Babu.
