= Neeta =

Neeta is a feminine given name. Notable people with the name include:

- Neeta Choudhary, Indian politician
- Neeta Devi, Indian kho kho player
- Neeta Dhungana, Nepalese actress
- Neeta Kadam, Indian cricketer
- Neeta Lulla, Indian costume designer
- Neeta Madahar, British artist
- Neeta Mehta, actress
- Neeta Pateriya, Indian parliamentarian
- Neeta Pillai, Indian actress
- Neeta Puri, Indian-American actress and model
- Neeta Ramaiya, Indian writer
- Neeta Sen, Indian classical music director and singer
- Neeta Shah, Indian producer and author
