= Desh Bhakta =

- Release date: 1940
- Country: India
- Language: Hindi

Desh Bhakta is a Bollywood film. It was released in 1940.

== Cast ==
- Wazir Mohammed Khan
- Harishchandra
- Ashalata
- Kashmiri
- Gope
- Agha
- Nissar
- Shah Nawaz
- Pir Mohamed
