= Tatar Ka Chor =

- Release date: 1940
- Country: India
- Language: Hindi

Tatar Ka Chor is a Bollywood action film. It was released in 1940.
