= K. Amarnath =

Indian Film Producer

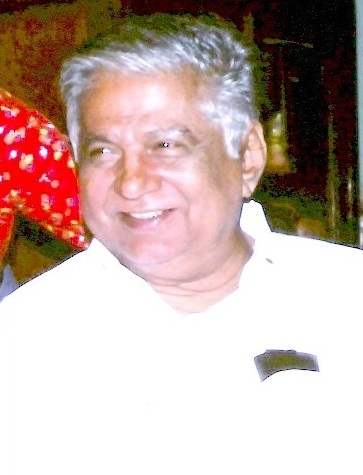
- K.Amarnath in 1978
- Born: 1 December 1914; Mianwali, Punjab, British India
- Died: 14 May 1983 (aged 68); Bombay, Maharashtra, India
- Occupation: Indian Film Producer/Director

K. Amarnath (1 Dec 1914 – 14 May 1983) was one of the earliest film makers of Indian Cinema. His career as a movie producer and director spanned over four decades in the film industry.

== Early life ==
Amarnath Gelaram Khetarpal was born in Mianwali, Punjab, British India. He spent his childhood in Mianwali and college years in Lahore. Inspired by Hollywood and British movies, Amarnath left home at a young age of 17 to join the film industry to become an actor.

== Career ==
Initially, K.Amarnath struggled for 4 years, first in Calcutta and then in Bombay acting in minor roles only. While working as a junior artiste, he realized that the director played a very important role in the making of a movie. So, his interest in acting in movies transferred to directing movies.

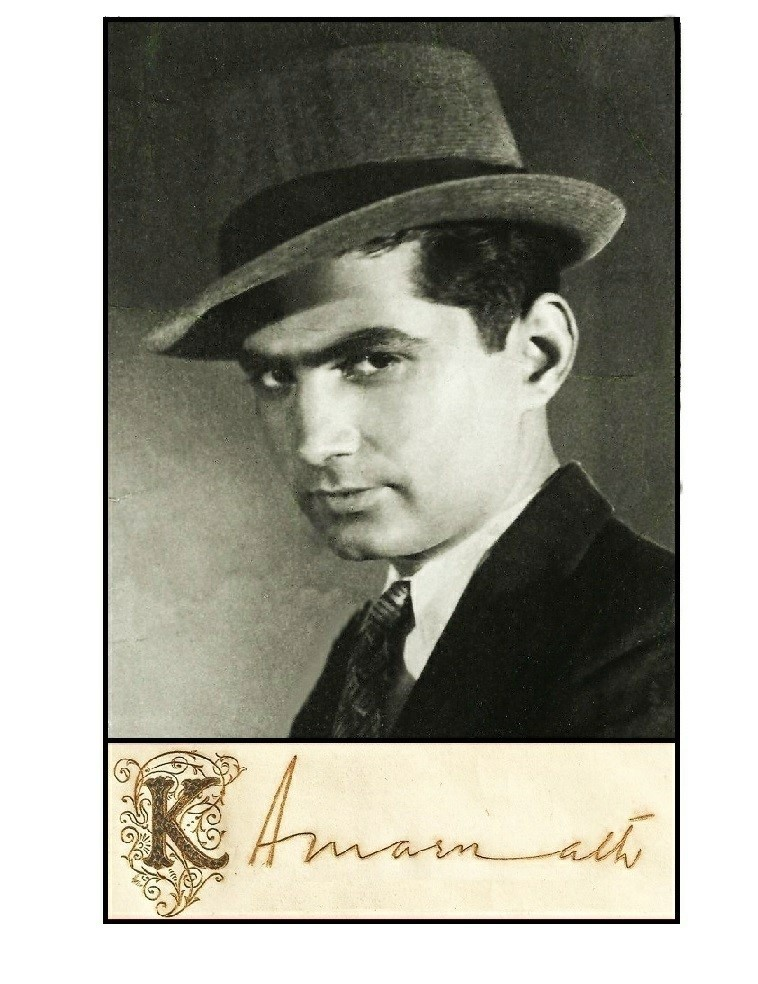
K.Amarnath - 1940

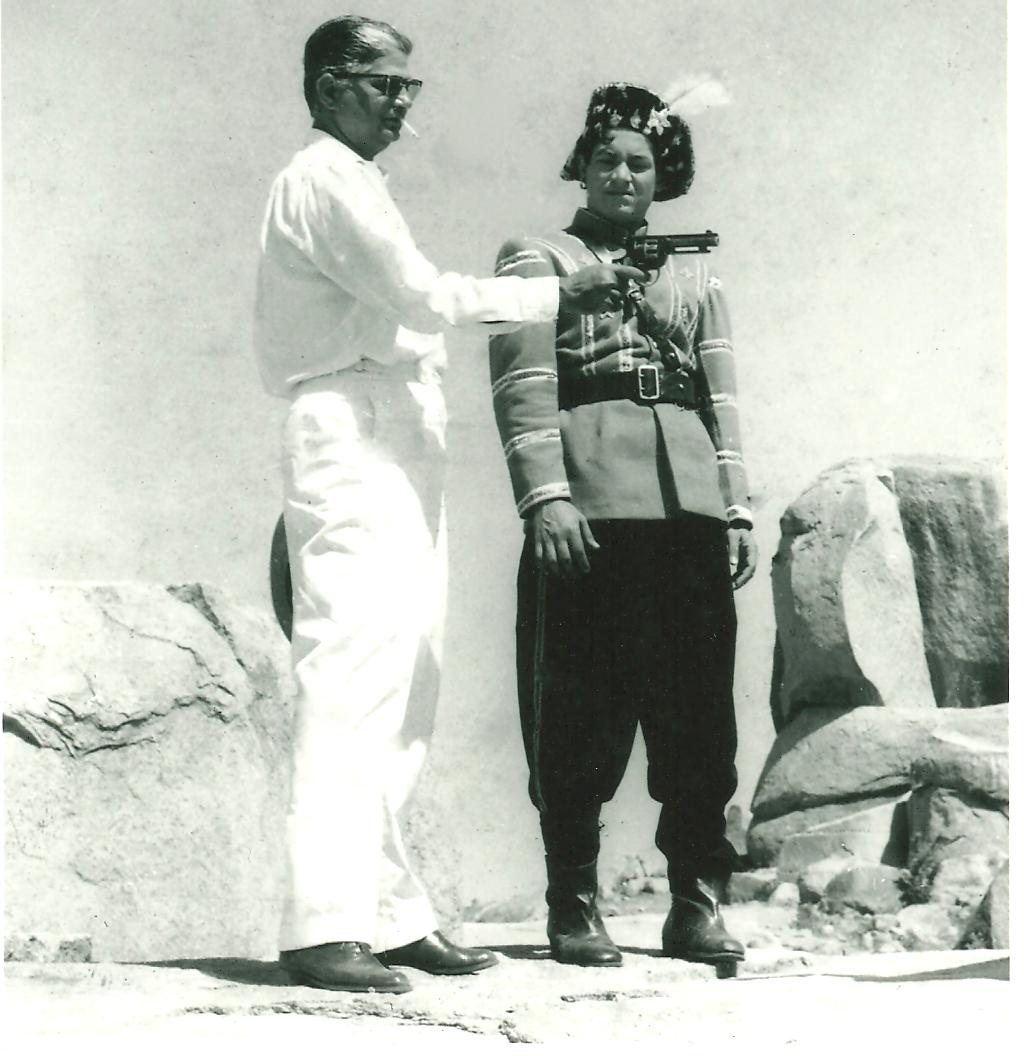
K.Amarnath with Salim Khan

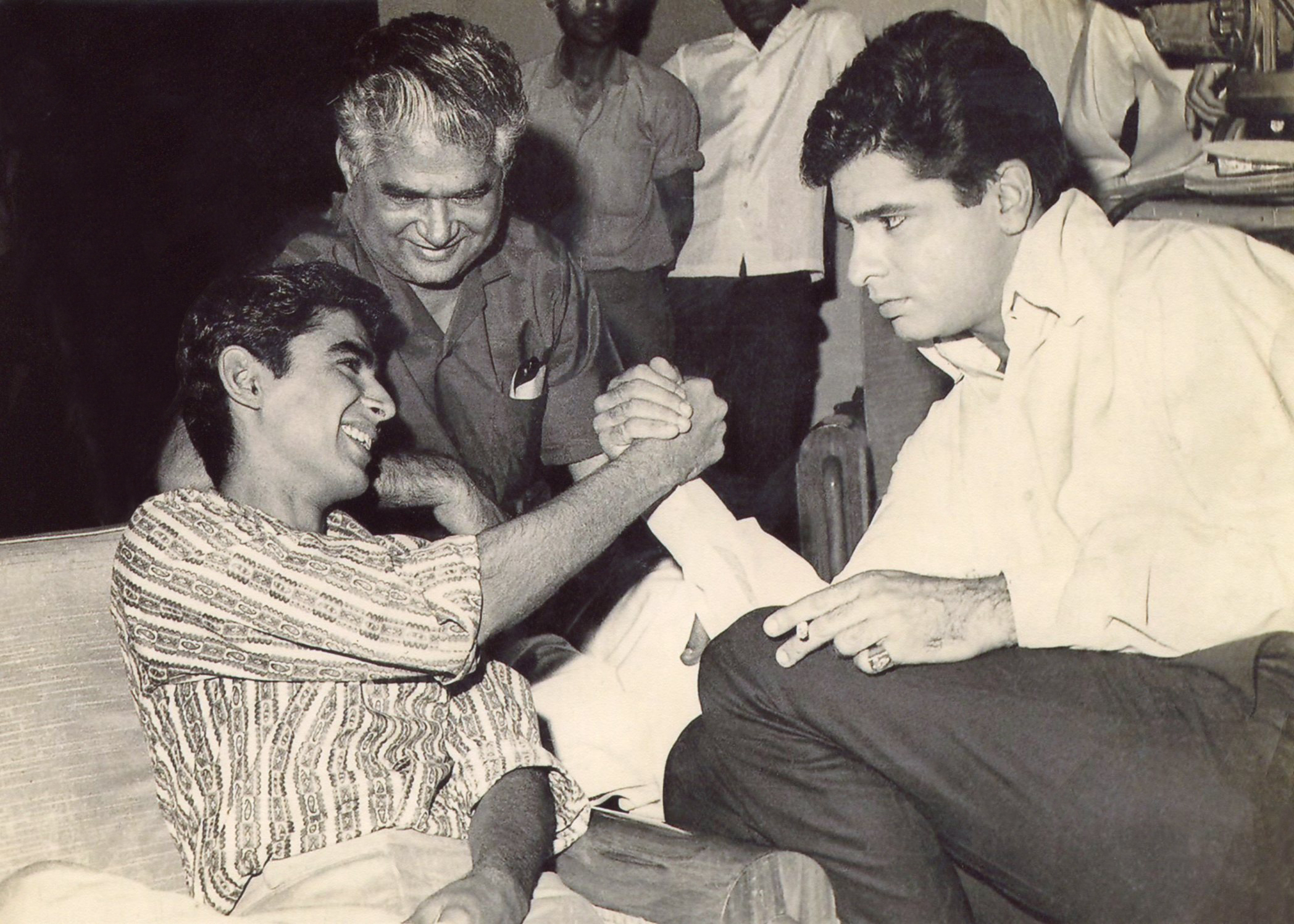
K.Amarnath with son Mohan & Sanjay Khan

After assisting various directors such as B.R.Patel and Dhirubhai Desai, he finally got his first break as a director in 1936 by Mr. Lakhia of Metro Movietone for the film titled "Matwali Jogan" aka "A Girl from Lahore". He was only 21 years old when he directed his first movie.

However, his major break came in 1937 when Ramaniklal & Mohanlal Shah, founders of Mohan Studios, Mumbai, offered him the opportunity to direct "Danger Signal" in Tamil.

At first, he directed 5 Tamil movies for Mohan Studios; two of them, "Minnalkodi" and "Veer Ramani" - both released in 1937 and both starring K.T.Rukmini and B.Srinivas Rao became super hits.

From 1937 to 1951, he directed 14 movies for Mohan Studios and its sister concern, Ramnik Productions.

Excepting for "Village Girl", mostly all of them were action movies.

During the same time span, being an independent director, he also directed 6 movies for different production houses.

In 1952, K.Amarnath created his own production company, "K.Amarnath Productions" and in 1953 released "Alif-Laila" - the first movie under his banner, followed by 11 more movies made under his production company.

From 1936 to 1971, K.Amarnath produced/directed 35 movies.

His office was located at Ranjit Studios, Dadar, Mumbai.

K.Amarnath was a versatile man. He not only produced and directed movies but also wrote the story & screenplay for many of his movies. Over the course of his career, the genres of the movies he directed ranged from action/suspense thrillers to family/social drama, legendary romantic tragedies, semi-musicals, costume drama to magical/fantasy movies. (See Filmography below).

Many well-known actors and music directors, worked in his movies. Some of them were - Ajit, Jayant (father of Amjad Khan), Murad, Pran (actor), Yakub, Gope, Mukri, Sajjan, Shyam, Kishore Kumar, Shammi Kapoor, Joy Mukherjee, Sanjay Khan, Bharat Bhushan, Salim Khan, Mehmood, Madhubala, Geeta Bali, Meena Kumari, Vyjayantimala, Nutan, Nimmi, Nalini Jaywant, Nanda, Nigar Sultana, Noor Jehan, Kum Kum, Kamini Kaushal, Ameeta, Shakila, Shashikala, Helen, Cuckoo, Indurani and also K.T.Rukmini & B.Shrinavasa Rao in the Tamil movies directed by him. Some of the music directors who gave their most memorable music in his movies were Nashad, Chitragupta (composer), O.P.Nayyar, Shyam Sundar, Kalyanji-Anandji, Laxmikant-Pyarelal, Ghulam Mohammed, Sardar Malik, and the brothers, Pt.Amarnath, Husnlal & Bhagatram.

Ajit (Ajit Khan) acted as a hero in 7 of the movies directed by K.Amarnath – Beqasoor, Meharbani, Sarkaar, Bara-Dari, Bada Bhai, Baraat and Kabli Khan. In fact, it was K.Amarnath who had suggested that he change his long name of "Hamid Ali Khan" to a shorter name. The first movie with his name changed to "Ajit" was "Beqasoor" -1950.

Shyam Sundar composed many unforgettable melodious songs in 3 of the hit movies directed by K.Amarnath – "Gaon ki Gori"- 1945, "Bazaar" - 1949 and "Alif-Laila" 1953.

Mohammed Rafi always "considered" the song "aji dil ho kaaboo mein to dildaar ki aisi taisi" with G. M. Durrani and chorus - music by Shyam Sundar from "Gaon ki Gori" 1945 - to be his first Hindi Film Song.

Noor Jehan was the heroine of 2 of the movies directed by K.Amarnath – "Gaon ki Gori "– 1945 and "Mirza Sahiban" – 1947. Both of them were super hits. Mirza Sahiban was her last movie in India before she moved to Pakistan.

K.Amarnath was well known for promoting aspiring young individuals. He introduced Salim Khan to the movies. (Salim of Salim–Javed fame and father of Bollywood superstar, Salman Khan). The first movie Salim acted in was K.Amarnath's " Baraat" – 1960.

Sanjay Khan's first movie signed as a hero in 1965 was for "Woh Din Yaad Karo".

Helen (actress) got her first break as a main/solo dancer in K. Amarnath's "Alif-Laila" - 1953.

Also, Minoo Mumtaz, sister of the famous Bollywood comedian Mehmood, made her film debut in K.Amarnath's "Bara-Dari" - 1955.

Four of the Hindi movies directed by K.Amarnath: Village Girl-Gaon Ki Gori - 1945 Mirza Sahibaan - 1947 - Beqasoor - 1950 (List of Bollywood films of 1950) and Bara-Dari - 1955 (List of Bollywood films of 1955) were among the top-grossing films of those years.

== Family ==
K.Amarnath lived in Shivaji Park, Mumbai - was married to Sumitra Batra and had 4 children – 2 sons and 2 daughters - Satish, Manmohan, Manju & Madhu.

== Filmography ==
Year	Title	Genre	Credit	Star Cast
1936	Matwali Jogan		Director/Story	Gulab, S.Nazir, Ermeline, Putlibai, Rajinder Singh, Vimla, Azurie, Shahani, Miss Pokhraj, Rajkumari
1937	Danger Signal (Tamil & Hindi)	Mystery Thriller	Director	Lalita, Rup Kumar, Nazeer, Masih, Takale
1937	Pucca Rowdy (Tamil)	Action/Stunt Thriller	Director	N/A
1937	Minnalkodi (Tamil)	Action/Stunt/Suspense Thriller	Director/Story	K.T.Rukmini, B. Srinivasa Rao, Coco, Gogia Pasha
1937	Veer Ramani - (Tamil) (Veera Ramani)	Action/Stunt Thriller	Director/Story & Scenario	K.T.Rukmini, B. Srinivasa Rao, S. R. Padma, T. V. Swami, K. Mani
1938	Bhagya Leela (Tamil)		Director	K.T.Rukmini, B. Srinivasa Rao, S. R. Padma
1939	Midnight Mail	Action	Director/Story & Scenario	Yasmin, S.Nazir, Nazir, Indurani, Gulab, Master Gulam Kader, Master Shiraz, Chandrakant, P.Varne
1939	Bahadur Ramesh (a.k.a. Volunteer)	Action	Director	Rajkumari, Yasmin (Betty Caroll), Nazir, S. Nazir, Jeevan, Sadiq Nawab, Devaskar, G.Rasool, Haroon
1939	Chasmawali	Action	Director	Indurani, Ashik Hussain, S. Nazir, Miss Lobo, S.M.Sadiq, Anwari, A.M.Shirazi, Baby Indira
1940	Tatar Ka Chor (a.k.a. Thief of Tatar)	Fantasy/Action/Stunt Thriller	Director/Story	Yakub, Indurani, Vatsala Kumthekar, Gulab, Mira, K.Hiralal
1940	Captain Kishori	Action	Director	S.Nazir, Lalita Pawar, Yasmin, Agha
1941	Bulbule Baghdad	Action/Stunt Thriller	Director/Story & Scenario	Indurani, Gulab, Jayant, Yakub, W.M.Khan, Sadiq, Anant Marathe
1942	Zevar	Action	Director	Jayant, Indurani, E. Billimoria, Raaj, Veena, Badri Prasad, Jagan, Mirajkar, Rama Shukul
1943	Chhed Chhad	Social	Director	Sitara, Nazir, Gope, Majid, Rajkumari
1944	Bandukwali	Action/Stunt Thriller	Director	S.Nazir, Romila, Anil Kumar, Rekha Pawar, Prakash, Mehar Banu
1945	Gaon Ki Gori (a.k.a. Village Girl)	Romantic/Family-Social Drama	Director/Story & Scenario	Noor Jehan, Nazir, Durga Khote, Rama Shukul, Anant Marathe, Gita Nizami, Jagdish Sethi
1947	Roop Nagar	Costume Drama	Director	Jayant, Raj Rani, Amrutlal, Mumtaz
1947	Mirza Sahiban (1947 film)|Legendary Romantic Tragedy	Director/Story & Scenario	Noor Jehan, Trilok Kapoor, Gope, Gulab, Amir Bano, Misra, Laxman, Baby Anwari, Cuckoo	
1949	Bazar - (Bazaar (1949 film))	Semi-Musical/Social	Director/Story & Scenario	Nigar Sultana, Shyam, Yakub, Gope, Amir Bano, Misra, Cuckoo, Badri Prasad, Mangla
1949	Shoharat	Social	Director/Story	Sofiya, Jayant, Padma Banerjee, E.Billimoria, Amir Bano
1950	Beqasoor	Family-Social Drama	Director/Story	Madhubala, Ajit, Yakub, Gope, Pramila, Durga Khote, Geeta Nizami, Ramesh, Mangla
1950	Meharbani	Social Drama	Director	Ajit, Yakub, Gope, Indu Pal, Begum Para, Shanta Pawar, Rama Shukul, Cuckoo
1951	Sarkar	Costume/Action Drama	Director/Story & Screenplay	Ajit, Usha Kiron, Veena, Shashikala, Ulhas, Cuckoo, Hiralal, S.Nazir, Murad
1953	Laila Majnu	Legendary Romantic Tragedy	Director	Nutan, Shammi Kapoor, Wasti, Ulhas, Om Prakash, Cuckoo and guest stars Jayant & Vijay Kumar
1953	Alif-Laila	Magical/Fantasy Adventure	Producer/Director	Nimmi, Asha Mathur, Pran, Vijay Kumar, Gope, Murad, Maya Devi, Amrit Rana, Tikku
1954	Mehbooba	Costume Drama	Producer/Director/Story	Nalini Jaywant, Shammi Kapoor, Gope, Hiralal, Amar, Achala Sachdev, W.M Khan
1955	Bara-Dari	Romantic-Costume Drama	Producer/Director	Geeta Bali, Ajit, Pran, Chandra Shekhar, Gope, Murad, Amir Bano, Ramesh Thakur, Cuckoo
1956	Naya Andaz	Semi-Musical/Social	Producer/Director/Story & Screenplay	Meena Kumari, Kishore Kumar, Pran, Gope, Johnny Walker, Kum Kum, Murad, Jayant
1957	Bada Bhai	Family-Social Drama	Producer/Director	Kamini Kaushal, Ajit, Jayant, Ameeta, Kum Kum, Nazir Hussain, Anant (Marathe) K., Amrit Rana, Helen, Tun Tun
1959	Kal Hamara Hai	Social Drama	Producer	Madhubala, Bharat Bhushan, Jayant, Leela Chitnis, Jagdev, Hari Shivdasani, Murad, Deepak
1960	Baraat	Romantic/Family-Social Drama	Producer/Director/Story & Screenplay	Ajit, Shakila, Mukri, Salim, Pratima Devi, Murad, Sajjan
1961	Bada Admi	Social Drama	Producer	Sheikh Mukhtar, Subi Raj, Vijaya Chowdhary, Jayant, Mukri, Ulhas, Sajjan
1963	Kabli Khan	Costume Drama	Producer/Director	Ajit, Helen, Jayant, Mukri, Samson, Salim, Amrit Rana, Indra Bansal, W.M. Khan, Deepak
1964	Ishaara	Romantic/Family-Social Drama	Producer/Director	Vyjayantimala, Joy Mukherjee, Jayant, Pran, Azra, Subi Raj, Sajjan, Pratima Devi
1971	Woh Din Yaad Karo	Romantic/Family-Social Drama	Producer/Director/Story & Screenplay	Nanda, Sanjay, Shashikala, Mehmood, Dhumal, Madan Puri, Murad, Ulhas, Wasti
