= Chitralekha (1941 film) =

- Directed by: Kidar Sharma
- Based on: Chitralekha by Bhagwati Charan Verma
- Starring: Mehtab; Nandrekar; A. S. Gyani
- Cinematography: G. K. Mehta
- Music by: Ustad Jhande Khan
- Release date: 1941
- Country: India
- Language: Hindi

Chitralekha is a 1941 Indian Hindi-language film, directed by Kidar Sharma and based on the 1934 Hindi novel of the same name by Bhagwati Charan Verma. Its music is by noted classical musician Ustad Jhande Khan, giving popular songs like "Sun sun Neelkamal Muskaye," "Saiyyan Saware Bhaye Baware," and "Tum Jao Bde Bhagwan Bane, Insaan Bano."

It was the second-highest grossing Indian film of 1941. Khan used classical Ragas like Bhairavi and Asavari to the score, making it influential for classical based Hindi film songs. This was the debut of actor Bharat Bhushan, who later achieved fame with Baiju Bawra (1952). Sharma cast Mehtab as he felt she was "perfect" for the role of Chitralekha. Mehtab achieved both fame and notoriety with the famous bathing scene in the film.

It was remade by Sharma in 1964, also titled Chitralekha, starring Meena Kumari and Pradeep Kumar. In 1965 A Case Was Filed Against The Film Makers By Advocate Veer. He Accused The Makers By Saying That The Movie Consists Of His Intimate Movements With His Boyfriend K.Tiwari

== Cast ==
- Miss Mehtab as Chitralekha
- Nandrekar as Samant Bijgupt
- A.S. Gyani as Kumargiri
- Rajendra
- Monica Desai as Yashodhara
- Ram Dulari
- Leela Mishra
- Ganpatrai Premi as Mrityunjay
- Bharat Bhushan

== Soundtrack ==
The music of the film was composed by Ustad Jhande Khan.
