= Chitralekha (novel) =

1934 novel by Bhagwati Charan Verma

- Author: Bhagwati Charan Verma
- Language: Hindi
- Subject: Philosophy
- Genre: Novel
- Publisher: Rajkamal Prakashan
- Publication date: 1934
- Publication place: India
- Media type: Bound
- Dewey Decimal: 891.433

Chitralekha is a 1934 Hindi novel by the Indian novel writer Bhagwati Charan Verma about the philosophy of life, love, sin and virtue.

It is said to be modelled on Anatole France's 1890 novel Thaïs but set in India. However, the author noted in the book's preface:

"The difference between Chitralekha and Anatole France's Thaïs, is as much as there is in me and Anatole. In Chitralekha, there is a problem, it is my own perspective of seeing the virtue and vice of human life, and it is also the music of my soul."

== Synopsis ==
Chitralekha is a slim volume with a narrative that is woven around a love story, and reflects on various aspects of human life.

The story commences with a dialogue between the revered hermit Ratnakar (रत्नाकर) and his disciples, Shwetaank (श्वेतांक) and Vishaldev (विशालदेव), discussing the sins of humanity. They conclude that humans are often victims and slaves of circumstance. Ratnakar posits that sin and virtue are not inherent but products of our circumstances. The author, Bhagwati Charan Varma, explores the notion that sin may be in action. Still, never in thought, anuraag (attachment/passion) is in desire, and viraag (alienation/lack of passion) comes from tripti (gratification). This candid and liberal perspective is a departure from the traditional Hindi literature of pre-independence India.

Chitralekha, the protagonist, embodies the life of a truly empowered woman: beautiful and resilient, driven by her own choices, generous by nature, and unwaveringly honest. She shatters the stereotypes surrounding women, presenting an accurate and humane portrayal. Chitralekha takes charge of her life, refusing to be swayed by societal norms and pressures. Her self-reflection and refusal to let her ego hinder her path to redemption lead her to triumph, as she finds both peace within passion and passion within peace.

This novel is a love story about a young general, Beejgupta (बीजगुप्त) and Chitralekha who was a beautiful dancer and a young widow. Beejgupta lives a luxurious life while serving under the Mauryan Empire ruled by King Chandragupta Maurya (340 BCE – 298 BCE). Kumargiri (कुमारगिरि) a hermit, also falls in love with Chitralekha and becomes a victim of his circumstances. Shwetaank and Vishaldev wish to find the truth about the holy and the unholy of life, as suggested by their guru, Ratnakar, but they too become slaves of circumstances, as does Beejgupta. The other characters are Yashodhara (यशोधरा), the princess; Yashodhara's father, the aged Mritunjay (मृत्युंज्य); and Chanakya (चाणक्य), who has been woven into the novel to make it interesting.

The novel has 22 sections that demonstrate clearly the futility of being judgmental.

== Translations ==
Language	Translator	Publisher	Title
Sanskrit	Niranjan Mishra	Rashtriya Sanskrit Sahitya Kendra Jaipur	Chitralekha
Gujarati	Kamal Sindha	Gurjar Sahitya Prakashan	Chitralekha
Telugu	Lanka Narayana Rao	Classic Books	Chitralekha
Marathi	Hemant Godse	Rajhans Prakashan	Chitralekha
Marathi	Malati Cholkar		Chitralekha
English	Pratibha Vinod Kumar and AK Kulshresth	Cernunos Books	The dancer, her lover and the yogi

== Adaptations ==
A Hindi movie, Chitralekha, released in 1964 was based on this novel. It was directed by Kidar Sharma and starred Ashok Kumar, Meena Kumari and Pradeep Kumar in leading roles. The director has also directed another movie Chitralekha (1941), which was based on the same novel.
