= Eddie Billimoria =

Indian actor and film director (1900–1981)

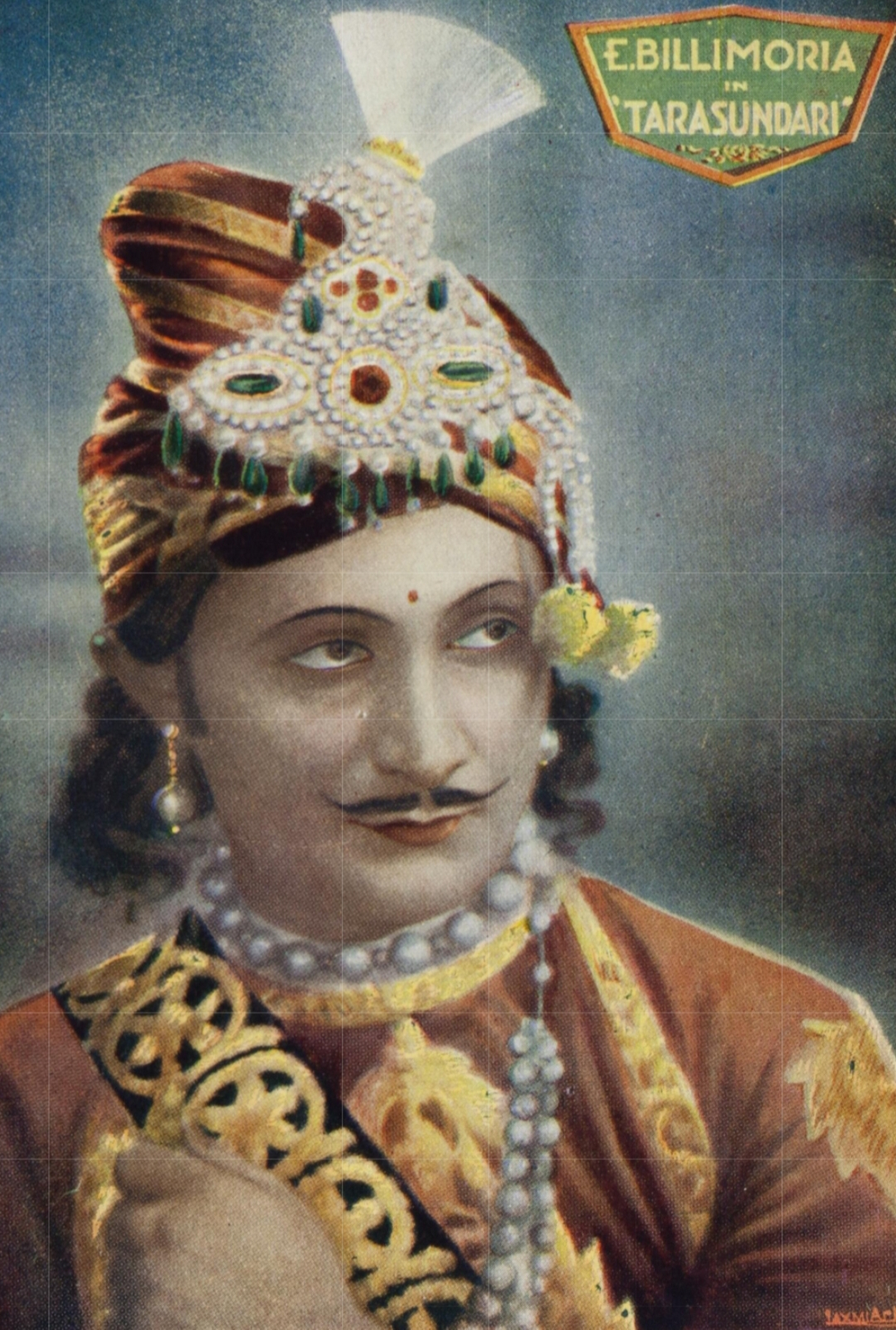
- Born: 1900; Kirkee, Bombay Presidency, British India
- Died: February 18, 1981 (aged 80–81); Bombay, Maharashtra, India
- Other names: E. Billimoria
- Occupations: Actor and music director
- Years active: 1929–1953
- Relatives: Dinshaw Billimoria (brother)

Eddie Billimoria (1900 – 18 February 1981) was an Indian actor and music director.

== Career ==
Eddie's first film had his brother playing the lead role. Playing a side character, Billimoria started off his journey in Hindi cinema with Punjab Mail.

The coming of talkies proved to be a turning point in his career and propelled it forward. Films from Imperial had him being paired with Sulochana, Sultana and Ermeline. Chandulal Shah's Ranjit Studios saw him pairing with Miss Gohar, Bibbo and Madhuri. Some of his films at Ranjit are Baghdad Ka Badmash, Rough of Rajasthan and Toofani Taruni. Professor Vaman, a scientific mystery drama had Billimoria in a supporting role. He later joined Paramount Studios of Kikubhai Desai which failed. Ultimately he was restricted to character roles which too were far–fetched.
