= Nanubhai Vakil =

Indian film director (1902–1980)

- Born: 23 May 1902; Bulsar, British India
- Died: 29 December 1980 (aged 78); Mumbai, India
- Occupations: Film Director, Film Producer, Writer
- Spouse: Anuradha Vakil
- Children: Rajesh Vakil, Rupa Joshi, Pradeep Vakil, Sunil Vakil, Navin Vakil and Jayshree Ramachandran
- Parent: Bhimbhai Desai

Nanubhai Vakil (23 May 1902 – 29 December 1980) was a Hindi and Gujarati film director. He directed the first Gujarati feature film, in 1932, with a biopic on the saint Narsinh Mehta, Narsinh Mehta, whose cast included the actress Mehtab.

== Career ==
Vakil frequently collaborated with Zubeida and Patience Cooper. The twelve-year-old Suraiya, who had done minor roles as a child artist in films like Usne Kya Socha (1937) was cast as the young Mumtaz in Taj Mahal (1941) by Vakil. Vakil later remade several of the silent films "based on Parsi theatre plays". W. M. Khan, who became famous as the first person to sing in an Indian film, "De De Allah Ke Naam Pe Pyare" in Alam Ara (1931) was made to reprise that song and role when he was seventy-one years old by Nanubhai Vakil. The film was Vakil's version of Alam Ara (1973), produced by Maffatlal Shah, with music by Iqbal Qureshi.

== Filmography ==
=== As a director ===
Year	Film	Notes
1929	Veer Pujan	Silent film
1929	Tit For Tat	Silent film
1929	Sinhaldweep Ki Sundari	Silent film
1929	Kumud Kumari	Silent film
1929	Dehna Daan	Silent film
1930	Vifreli Waghan	Silent film
1930	Vanraj	Silent film
1930	Sorathi Baharvatiyo	Silent film
1930	Sheikh Chilli	Silent film
1930	Rasili Radha	Silent film
1930	Ranakdevi	Silent film
1930	Madhbhar Mohini	Silent film
1930	Desh Deepak	Silent film
1931	Noor-E-Alam	Silent film
1931	Mojili Mashuq	Silent film
1931	Hoor-E-Roshan	Silent film
1931	Baghdad Nu Bulbul	Silent film
1931	Azadi Nu Jung	Silent film
1931	Albeli Mumbai	Silent film
1932	Nakhreli Nar	Silent film
1932	Baghdad Ka Badmash	Silent film
1932	Narsinh Mehta	First Gujarati talkie
1932	Bulbule Baghdad	Hindi
1933	Bulbule Punjab	Hindi
1934	Rashk-e-Laila	Hindi, Writer
1934	Nand Ke Lala	Hindi
1934	Seva Sadan	Hindi
1935	Birbal Ki Beti	Hindi
1936	Mr. and Mrs. Bombay	Hindi
1937	Fakhre Islam	Hindi
1938	Banke Sanvaria	Hindi
1941	Jadui Bandhan	Hindi
1941	Taj Mahal	Hindi
1943	Naya Zamana	Hindi
1946	Baghdad Ka Chor	Hindi
1947	Chithrabahavali	Tamil
1947	Vedhalapuram	Tamil
1948	Desh Seva	Hindi
1950	Raj Mukut	Hindi
1954	Gul Bahar	Hindi
1955	Hatimtai Ki Beti	Hindi, Producer
1956	Lalkaar	Hindi
1956	Yahudi Ki Beti	Hindi
1957	Bansari Bala	Hindi
1958	Pehla Pehla Pyar	Hindi
1959	Flying Rani	Hindi
1964	Idd Ka Chand	Hindi
1971	Shaan-e Khuda	Hindi
1973	Alam Ara	Hindi
