= Nargis filmography =

Indian Actress

Nargis Dutt (née Fatima Rashid; 1 June 1929 – 3 May 1981) was an Indian actress active between 1935 and 1968. She made her screen debut in a minor role at the age of five with Naachwali (1934).

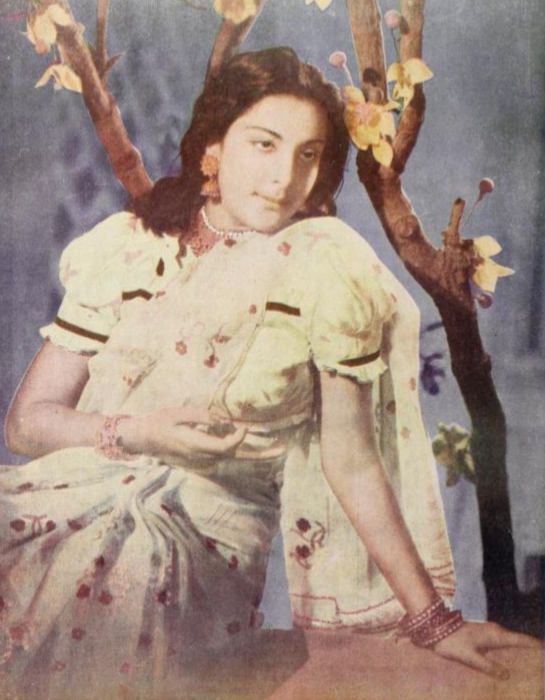
Nargis (1929–1981)

Her best-known role was that of Radha in the Academy Award-nominated Mother India (1957), a performance that won her the Filmfare Award for Best Actress. Her last film was the drama Raat Aur Din (1967), for which she received the inaugural National Film Award for Best Actress.

== Films ==
Sourced from the Encyclopaedia of Indian Cinema (1999), published by British Film Institute:

Year	Title	Role	Notes
1934	Naachwali		Credited as "Baby Rani"
1935	Talash-e-Haq	Razia	Credited as "Baby Rani"
1936	Hridaya Manthan		Credited as "Baby Rani"
1936	Madam Fashion		Credited as "Baby Rani"
1937	Moti Ka Haar		Credited as "Baby Rani"
1942	Tamanna		Credited as "Baby Rani"
1942	Pardanasheen		Credited as "Baby Rani"
1943	Taqdeer	Shyama	
1944	Anban	Malti	
1944	Ismat		
1944	Rajkumar		
1945	Humayun	Hamida Bano	
1945	Bisvi Sadi	Veena	
1945	Ramayani	Sita	
1946	Nargis	Shanti	
1947	Mehndi		
1947	Romeo and Juliet	Juliet	
1948	Aag	Nimmi	
1948	Anjuman		
1948	Anokha Pyar	Geeta	
1948	Mela	Manju	
1949	Darogaji	Rajni alias Raju	
1949	Barsaat	Reshma	
1949	Andaz	Neena	
1949	Lahore	Leelo	
1949	Roomal		
1950	Aadhi Raat		
1950	Khel		
1950	Jogan	Survi alias Meera Devi	
1950	Meena Bazaar	Radha	
1950	Birha Ki Raat		
1950	Babul	Bela	
1950	Chhoti Bhabhi	Asha	
1950	Pyar	Rani	
1950	Jan Pahechan	Asha	
1950	Bhishma Pratigya		
1951	Awaara	Rita	
1951	Hulchul	Asha	
1951	Deedar	Mala	
1951	Pyar Ki Baten	Nadira	
1951	Saagar	Pali	
1952	Anhonee	Roop Singh / Mohini Bai (Note: Nargis played dual role.)	
1952	Ashiana	Gaura	
1952	Amber	Amber	
1952	Sheesha		
1952	Bewafa	Roopa	
1953	Paheli Shaadi		
1953	Aah	Neelu	
1953	Papi	Lacchi	
1953	Dhoon	Kamini	
1954	Angarey	Tulsi	
1955	Shree 420	Vidya	
1956	Chori Chori	Kammo	
1956	Jagte Raho	Temple singer	Cameo role
1957	Mother India	Radha	Won: Filmfare Award for Best Actress
1957	Pardesi	Champa	
1957	Miss India	Rama	
1958	Adalat	Nirmala	
1958	Lajwanti	Kavita	
1958	Ghar Sansar	Uma	
1960	Kala Bazar	Herself	One of the stars invited at the premiere of Mother India (1957) at Maratha Mandir
1964	Yaadein	Priya	Only silhouette and voice used
1967	Raat Aur Din	Varuna alias Peggy	Last released film; Won: National Film Award for Best Actress
