= List of Indian child actors =

This is a list of child actors from India. Films and/or television series they appeared in are mentioned only if they were still a child at the time of filming.

Current child actors (under the age of eighteen) are indicated by boldface.

== A ==
- **Thennal Abhilash** (born 2014)
  - Forensic (2020)
  - Minnal Murali (2021)
  - Lalitham Sundaram (2022)
  - Voice of Sathyanathan (2023)
  - Sesham Mike-il Fathima (2023)
  - Rudhran (2023)
  - Story of Things (2023)
  - Manorathangal (2024)
  - Nancy Rani (2025)
- Rubina Ali (born 1999 or 2000)
  - Slumdog Millionaire (2008)
  - Bollywood Hero (2009)
  - Kal Kisne Dekha (2009)
  - John Carter (2012)
  - Powder Room (2013)

== B ==
- Shruti Bhist (born 2003)
  - Ek Nayi Chhoti Si Zindagi (188 episodes, 2011)
  - Chintu Chinki Aur Ek Badi Si Love Story (2011-2012)
  - Hitler Didi (2012-2013)
  - Phir Subah Hogi (2012)
  - Saath Nibhaana Saathiya (2013)
  - Rajjo (2013)
  - Arjun (2013)
  - Bangg (2014)
  - Baal Veer (2014-2016)
  - Vani Rani (2017-2018)
  - Mere Sai - Shraddha Aur Saburi (2020)
  - Pandya Store (1 episode, 2021)
  - Radhe (2021)
  - The Family Man (3 episodes, 2021)
  - Out of Love (2021)

== C ==
- Ahsaas Channa (born 1999)
  - Vaastu Shastra (2004)
  - Marrichettu (2004)
  - Saathi: The Companion (2005)
  - Kabhi Alvida Naa Kehna (2006)
  - Aryan (2006)
  - My Friend Ganesha (2007)
  - Kasamh Se (2 episodes, 2007-2008)
  - Phoonk (2008)
  - 340 (2009)
  - Bommayi (2009)
  - Love Kaa Taddka (2009)
  - Phoonk 2 (2010)
  - Savdhaan India (2 episodes, 2012)
  - Devon Ke Dev...Mahadev (74 episodes, 2012-2014)
  - Oye Jassie (2013-2014)
  - Gumrah: End of Innocence (1 episode, 2014)
  - Pyaar Tune Kya Kiya (1 episode, 2014)
  - MTV Fanaah (32 episodes, 2014)
  - Appavin Meesai (2014)
  - Webbed (2014)
  - Yam Kisi Se Kam Nahi (2014)
  - Crime Patrol (19 episodes, 2014-2017)
  - Gangaa (2015)
  - Code Red - Talaash (2015)
  - Aadha Full (2016)
  - Rukh (2017)
- Spandan Chaturvedi (born 2007)
  - Ek Veer Ki Ardaas...Veera (2012)
  - Best of Luck Nikki (7 episodes, 2012-2016)
  - Sanskaar – Dharohar Apnon Ki (6 episodes, 2013)
  - The Suite Life of Karan & Kabir (1 episode, 2013)
  - Madhubala – Ek Ishq Ek Junoon (2014)
  - Udaan (2014)
  - Who Is She? (2018)
  - Nanu Ki Jaanu (2018)
  - Laal Ishq (2019)
  - The Sholay Girl (2019)
  - Shakuntala Devi (2020)
  - Dancing Queen (short film, 2022)
  - RRR (2022)
- Tanay Chheda (born 1996)
  - Don: The Chase Begins Again (2006)
  - Taare Zameen Par (Like Stars on Earth) (2007)
  - Slumdog Millionaire (2008)
  - Sukrit's Sundays (short film, 2008)
  - My Name is Khan (2010)
  - Lilly the Witch: The Journey to Mandolan (2011)
- Master Chicoo (born 1950s)
  - Bedard Zamana Kya Jane (1959)
  - Ek Phool Ek Bhool (1968)
  - Nadaan (1971)
  - Man Mandir (1971)
  - Sanjog (1972)
  - Raampur ka Lakshman (1972)
  - Be-Imaan (1972)
  - Sultana Dakku (1973)
  - Raja Rani (1973)
  - Chhalia (1973)
  - Aap ki Kasam (1974)
  - Do Chattane (1974)
  - Rajnigandha (1974)
  - Insaaniyat (1974)
  - The Runaways (1975)
  - Salaakhen (1975)
  - Badnaam (1975)
  - Fakira (1975)
  - Yaarron Ka Yaar (1977)
  - Sone Ki Lanka (1977)

== D ==
- Bobby Deol (born 1969)
  - Dharam Veer (1977)
- Ruhanika Dhawan (born 2007)
  - Mrs. Kaushik Ki Paanch Bahuein (2011)
  - Yeh Hai Mohabbatein (2013-2019)
  - Jai Ho (2014)
  - Ghayal: Once Again (2016)
  - Yeh Hai Chahatein (1 episode, 2019)
  - Mere Sai - Shraddha Aur Saburi (2021)

== G ==
- Ashutosh Lobo Gajiwala (born 1993)
  - Slumdog Millionaire (2008)
- Bhavya Gandhi (born 1997)
  - Taarak Mehta Ka Ooltah Chashmah (2008-2017)
  - Striker (2010)
- Suresh Gopi (born 1958)
  - Odeyil Ninnu (1965)
- Avika Gor (born 1997)
  - Ssshhhh... Phir Koi Hai (2 episodes, 2006)
  - Raajkumar Aaryyan (1 episode, 2008)
  - Balika Vadhu (119 episodes, 2008-2010)
  - Morning Walk (2009)
  - Paathshaala (2010)
  - Sasural Simar Ka (162 episodes, 2011-2018)
  - Tezz (2012)
  - Uyyala Jampala (2013)
  - Lakshmi Raave Maa Intiki (2014)
  - Cinema Choopistha Mava (2015)
  - Thanu Nenu (2015)
  - Care of Footpath 2 (2015)
  - Kill Them Young (2015)
- Gracy Goswami (born 2003)
  - Balika Vadhu (3 episodes, 2008)
  - Bandhan (2014-2015)
  - Balika Vadhu (2015-2016)
  - Udaan (1 episode, 2016)
  - Baal Krishna (2016-2017)
  - Begum Jaan (2017)
  - Mayavi Maling (2018)
  - Commando 3 (2019)
  - Thappad (2020)
  - Bhalla Calling Bhalla (2020)
  - The Empire (2021)
  - The Tenant (2021)
  - Chhorii (2021)
  - Kyun Utthe Dil Chhod Aaye (2021)
- Adarsh Gourav (born 1994)
  - My Name Is Khan (2010)

== H ==
- Kamal Haasan (born 1954)
  - Kalathur Kannamma (1959)
  - Paadha Kannikkai (1962)
  - Kannum Karalum (1962)
  - Vaanampadi (1963)
  - Anandha Jodhi (1963)

== I ==
- Daisy Irani (born 1950)
  - Ek Hi Raasta (1956)
  - Naya Daur (1957)
  - Hum Panchhi Ek Daal Ke (1957)
  - Jailor (1958)
  - Qaidi No 911 (1959)
  - Do Ustad (1959)
- Azharuddin Mohammed Ismail (born 1998)
  - Slumdog Millionaire (2008)
  - Kal Kisne Dekha (cameo, 2009)
  - Dukandar (short film, 2010)

== J ==
- Farida Jalal (born 1950)

== K ==
- Prachi Kadam (born 2005)
  - Malaal (2019)
  - Safe Journeys (1 episode, 2019)
  - Mohabbat karte ain tumbe (music video, 2021)
- Shashi Kapoor (1938-2017)
  - Aag (1948)
  - Awaara (1951)
- Ayesha Kapur (born 1994)
  - Black (2005)
- Ashnoor Kaur (born 2004)
  - Jhansi Ki Rani (2008-2011)
  - Shobha Somnath Ki (2011-2012)
  - Na Bole Tum Na Maine Kuch Kaha (2012-2013)
  - manmarziyaan (2018)
- Avneet Kaur (born 2001)
  - Meri Maa (2011-2012)
  - Tedhe Hain Par Tere Mere Hain (2012)
  - Savitri - Ek Prem Kahani (2013)
  - Ek Mutthi Aasmaan (1 episode, 2013)
  - Mardaani (2014)
  - Hamari Sister Didi (2014-2015)
  - Twistwala Love (2015)
  - Lage Raho Chachu (2015)
  - Crime Patrol (1 episode, 2016)
  - Dost (2016)
  - Qarib Qarib Singlle (cameo, 2017)
  - Chandra Nandini (1 episode, 2017)
  - Brunie (2018)
  - Babbar Ka Tabbar (2018)
  - Ekta (2019)
  - Mardaani 2 (cameo, 2019)
- Aamir Khan (born 1965)
  - Yaadon Ki Baaraat (1973)
  - Madhosh (1974)
- Imran Khan (born 1983)
  - Qayamat Se Qayamat Tak (1988)
  - Jo Jeeta Wohi Sikandar (1992)
- Sajid Khan (1951-2023)
  - Mother India (1957)
  - Son of India (1962)
  - Maya (1966)
- Ayush Mahesh Khedekar (born 2000)
  - Baa Bahoo Aur Baby (2005-2010)
  - Slumdog Millionaire (2008)
  - Gandhi of the Month (2014)
  - Jai Gangaajal (2016)
- Kunal Khemu (born 1983)
  - Hum Hain Rahi Pyar Ke (1993)
  - Raja Hindustani (1996)
  - Bhai (1997)
  - Zakhm (1998)
- Anand Krishnamoorthi (born 1980)
  - Anjali (1990)
  - May Madham (1994)
  - Sathi Leelavathi (1995)
  - Aasai (1995)
- Harish Kumar (born 1975)
  - Ek Hi Bhool (1979)
  - Premabhishekam (1981)
  - Kondaveeti Simham (1981)
  - Trishulam (1982)
  - Jeevan Dhaara (1982)
  - Farz Aur Kanoon (1982)
  - Andha Kanoon (1983)
  - Donga (1985)
- Ratan Kumar (1941-2016)
  - Baiju Bawra (1952)
  - Do Bigha Zameen (1953)
  - Boot Polish (1953)
- Meena Kumari (1933-1972)
  - Leatherface (1939)
  - Pooja (1940)
  - Bahen (1941)
  - Lal Haveli (1944)

== L ==
- Tanvi Ganesh Lonkar (born 1995)
  - Slumdog Millionaire (2008)
  - Teenage (2013)

== M ==
- Madhubala (1933-1969)
  - Basant (1942)
  - Mumtaz Mahal (1944)
  - Phoolwari (1946)
- Baby Madhuri
  - Sandesha (1940)
  - Muqabala (1942)
  - Vishvas (1943)
  - Bachpan (1945)
- Mahima Makwana (born 1999)
  - Mohe Rang De (2008-2009)
  - Balika Vadhu (2008)
  - Miley Jab Hum Tum (2008)
  - Sawaare Sabke Sapne... Preeto (2011-2012)
  - Aahat (2012)
  - CID (1 episode, 2012)
  - Sapne Suhane Ladakpan Ke (2012-2015)
  - Dil Ki Baatein Dil Hi Jaane (2015)
  - Code Red (2015)
  - Pyaar Tune Kya Kiya (2015)
  - Adhuri Kahaani Hamari (2015-2016)
  - Venkatapuram (2017)
- Master Manjunath (born 1976)
  - Malgudi Days (1987)
  - Agneepath (1990)
- Urmila Matondkar (born 1974)
  - Kalyug (1980)
  - Masoom (1983)
  - Bhavna (1984)
  - Dacait (1987)
  - Bade Ghar Ki Beti (1989)
- Hansika Motwani (born 1991)
  - Escape from Taliban (2003)
  - Hawa (2003)
  - Koi... Mil Gaya (2003)
  - Aabra Ka Daabra (2004)
  - Jaago (2004)
  - Hum Kaun Hai? (2004)
  - Kyunki Saas Bhi Kabhi Bahu Thi (2003)
  - Des Mein Niklla Hoga Chand (2003)
  - Karishma Kaa Karishma (2003)
  - Sonpari (2003)
  - Shaka Laka Boom Boom (2001–03)
- Baby Munmun (born 196x)
  - Jeevan Jyoti (1976)
  - Minoo (1977)
  - Bharat Ki Santan (1980)
- Mayukh Mukherjee (born 1997)
  - Sabujer Deshe (2002)
  - Seemantey Dnariye (2004)
  - Aleya (2004-2005)
  - Jaya (2004)
  - Light House (2004)
  - Neel Seemana (2004-2006)
  - Samparka (2004)
  - Seemantey Dnariye (2004)
  - Bagh Bandi Khela (2005)
  - Debi (2005)
  - Four Plus (2005)
  - Andar Mahal (2006-2007)
  - Biswa Arjun (2006)
  - Priyotama (2006)
  - Sadhak Bama Khyapa (2006)
  - Drishti Pradip (2008)
  - Ek Nadir Galpo (2015)
  - Aay Tobe Sohochori (2021)

== N ==
- **Deva Nandha** (born 2013)
  - Malikappuram (2022)
  - Thottappan (2019)
  - My Santa (2019)
  - Simon Daniel (2022)
  - Neymar (2023)
- Nargis (1929-1981)
  - Talashe Haq (1935)
  - Sher Dil Aurat (1935)
  - Shadi Ki Raat (1935)
  - Hriday Manthan (1936)
  - Madam Fashion (1936)
  - Moti Ka Haar (1937)
  - Pardanasheen (1942)
  - Taqdeer (1943)
  - Anban (1944)
  - Bisvi Sadi (1945)
  - Humayun (1945)
  - Ramayani (1945)
  - Mehandi (1947)
  - Nargis (1947)
  - Romeo & Juliet (1947)
- Sonu Nigam (born 1973)
  - Pyaara Dushman (1980)
  - Kaamchor (1982)
  - Ustadi Ustad Se (1982)
  - Betaab (1983)
  - Hum Se Hai Zamana (1983)
  - Taqdeer (1983)

== R ==
- Jannat Zubair Rahmani (born 2001)
  - Chand Ke Paar Chalo (2008-2009)
  - Kashi – Ab Na Rahe Tera Kagaz Kora (2010)
  - Dill Mill Gayye (2 episodes, 2010)
  - Matti Ki Banno (2010-2011)
  - Aagaah: The Warning (2011)
  - Luv Ka The End (2011)
  - Haar Jeet (2011-2012)
  - Phulwa (2011-2012)
  - Fear Files: Darr Ki Sacchi Tasvirein (1 episode, 2012)
  - Savdhaan India: Crime Alert (1 episode, 2012)
  - Gumrah: End of Innocence (243 episodes, 2012-2016)
  - Best of Luck Nikki (1 episode, 2013)
  - Ek Thhi Naayka (2 episodes, 2013)
  - Bharat Ka Veer Putra–Maharana Pratap (206 episodes, 2013)
  - Maha Kumbh: Ek Rahasaya, Ek Kahani (1 episode, 2014)
  - Siyaasat (42 episodes, 2014-2015)
  - Stories by Rabindranath Tagore (1 episode, 2015)
  - Tujhse Naraz Nahi Zindagi (1 episode, 2015)
  - Meri Awaaz Hi Pehchaan Hai (2016)
  - Ishq Mein Marjawan (2017)
  - Karmaphal Daata Shani (7 episodes, 2017)
  - What Will People Say (2017)
  - Tu Aashiqui (2017-2018)
  - Hichki (2018)
  - Divya Drishti (1 episode, 2019)
  - Aap Ke Aa Jane Se (2019)
  - Chaal Gazab Hai (short film, 2019)
- Puneeth Rajkumar (1975-2021)
  - Premada Kanike (1976)
  - Sanaadi Appanna (1977)
  - Thayige Takka Maga (1978)
  - Vasantha Geetha (1980)
  - Bhagyavantha (1981)
  - Thayige Thakka Maga (1981)
  - Bhoomige Banda Bhagavantha (1981)
  - Hosa Belaku (1982)
  - Chalisuva Modagalu (1982)
  - Bhakta Prahlada (1983)
  - Eradu Nakshatragalu (1983)
  - Yarivanu (1984)
  - Bettada Hoovu (1985)
  - Shiva Mecchida Kannappa (1988)
  - Parashuram (1989)
  - Parashuram (1989)
  - Pritam Priyadarshni (2019)
- Saroja Ramamrutham (1931-2019)
  - Balayogini (1937)
- Roja Ramani (born 1959)
  - Bhakta Prahlada (1967)
  - Iru Malargal (1967)
  - Ethiroli (1970)
  - Enga Mama (1970)
  - Ramalayam (1971)
  - Apna Desh (1972)
  - Chembarathy (1972)
  - Panitheeratha Veedu (1973)
  - Paruva Kaalam (1974)
  - En Magan (1974)
  - O Seeta Katha (1974)
  - Bali Peetam (1975)
- Hrithik Roshan (born 1974)
  - Aasha (1980)
  - Aap Ke Deewane (1980)
  - Bhagwan Dada (1986)
- **Bhoomi Ramola** (born 2016)
  - Ufff..Yeh Love Hai Mushkil (2025)
  - Pushpa Impossible (2025–present)
  - Chumbak (TV series) (2026)

== S ==
- Sabu (1924-1963)
  - Elephant Boy (1937)
  - The Drum (1938)
  - The Thief of Bagdad (1940)
  - Jungle Book (1942)
  - Arabian Nights (1942)
- Shivshakti Sachdev (born 1993)
  - Bhabhi (2007-2008)
  - Hero - Bhakti Hi Shakti Hai (2007)
  - Balika Vadhu (2 episodes, 2008)
  - Break Time Masti Time (2008-2009)
  - Uttaran (2009)
  - Sabki Laadli Bebo (2009-2011)
  - Afsar Bitiya (1 episode, 2011)
- Ritvik Sahore (born 2000)
  - Ferrari Ki Sawaari (2012)
  - Dangal (2016)
  - The Good Karma Hospital (1 episode, 2017)
  - Laakhon Mein Ek (season 1, 2017)
  - Flames (2018-2023)
  - Awkward Conversations with Parents (2018)
  - Gauru: Journey of Courage (2018)
- Namit Shah (born 2001)
  - Jeet Jayenge Hum (2009)
  - Sapna Babul Ka...Bidaai (2009)
  - Mata Ki Chowki (2009)
  - Mitwa Phool Kamal Ke (2009)
  - Break Ke Baad (2010)
  - The Suite Life of Karan & Kabir (2012-2013)
  - Main Krishna Hoon (2013)
  - Ramaiya Vastavaiya (2013)
  - Fear Files (2013-2014)
  - Hasee Toh Phasee (2014)
  - Raja Natwarlal (2014)
  - Baal Veer (2014)
  - Goldie Ahuja Matric Pass (2015)
  - Khoob Ladi Mardaani...Jhansi Ki Rani (2019)
  - Crime Patrol (2 episodes, 2019)
- Fatima Sana Shaikh (born 1992)
  - The Zee Horror Show (1 episode, 1996)
  - Ishq (1997)
  - Chachi 420 (1997)
  - Bade Dilwala (1999)
  - Khoobsurat (1999)
  - One 2 Ka 4 (2001)
  - Kitty Party (2002-2004)
  - Aakheer (2007)
  - Tahaan (2008)
  - Ladies Special (2009)
  - Agle Janam Mohe Bitiya Hi Kijo (2009)
- Silambarasan (born 1983)
  - Oru Thayin Sabhatham (1987)
  - En Thangai Kalyani (1988)
  - Samsara Sangeetham (1989)
  - Shanti Enathu Shanti (1991)
  - Enga Veetu Velan (1992)
  - Sabash Babu (1993)
  - Pettredutha Pillai (1993)
  - Rajadi Rajavan (1993)
  - Oru Vasantha Geetham (1994)
  - Thai Thangai Paasam (1995)
- Neetu Singh (born 1958)
  - Suraj (1966)
  - Dus Lakh (1966)
  - Do Kaliyaan (1968)
  - Ghar Ghar Ki Kahani (1970)
  - Pavitra Paapi (1970)
- Sridevi (1963-2018)
  - Bala Bharatam (1972)
  - Bhakta Tukaram (1973)
  - Badi Panthulu (1972)
  - Yashoda Krishna (1975)
  - Julie (1975)
- Tara Sutaria (born 1995)
  - Big Bada Boom (2010)
  - Best of Luck Nikki (cameo, 2 episodes, 2011-2012)
  - The Suite Life of Karan & Kabir (26 episodes, 2012)
  - Shake It Up (cameo, 2013)
  - Oye Jassie (26 episodes, 2013-2014)

== T ==
- Tabassum (1944-2022)
  - Bari Behen (1949)
  - Jogan (1950)
  - Deedar (1951)
  - Baiju Bawra (1952)
- Ayush Tandon (born 1998)
  - 7 Khoon Maaf (2011)
  - Life of Pi (2013)
  - Bajirao Mastani (2015)
- Nivetha Thomas (born 1994)
  - My Dear Bhootham (2004-2007)
  - Shivamayam (2004-2006)
  - Raja Rajeswari (2005-2006)
  - Arase (2007-2008)
  - Thenmozhiyal (2008)
  - Veruthe Oru Bharya (2008)
  - Kuruvi (2008)
  - Madhya Venal (2009)
  - Pranayam (2011)
  - Chaappa Kurish (2011)
  - Poraali (2011)
  - Thattathin Marayathu (2012)
  - Romans (2013)
  - Naveena Saraswathi Sabatham (2013)
- Suchita Trivedi (born 1976)
  - Woh Saat Din (1983)

== W ==
- Zaira Wasim (born 2000)
  - Dangal (2016)
  - Secret Superstar (2017)
