= Shamshad Begum =

Indian playback singer (1919–2013)

Shamshad Begum Padma Bhushan
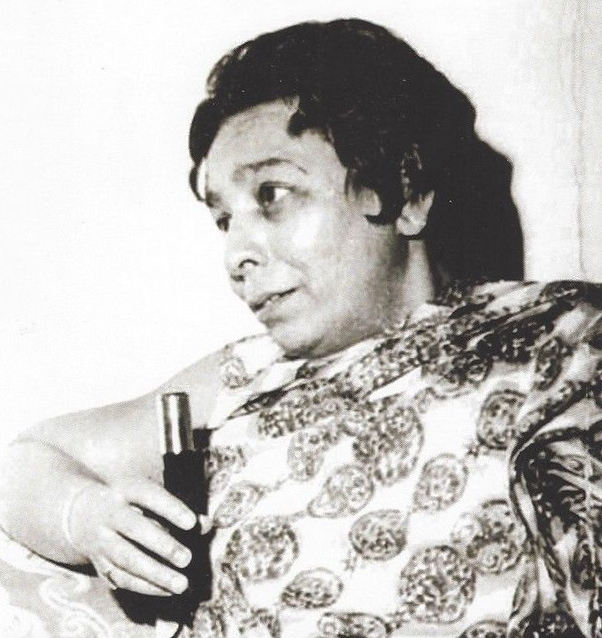
- Begum in 1970
- Born: 14 April 1919; Lahore, Punjab, British India (present-day Punjab, Pakistan)
- Died: 23 April 2013 (aged 94); Hiranandani Gardens, Mumbai, Maharashtra, India
- Spouse: Ganpat Lal Batto (m. 1934; died 1955)
- Parents: Mian Hussain Baksh (father); Ghulam Fatima (mother)
- Awards: O. P. Nayyar Award (2009); Padma Bhushan Award (2009)
- Musical career
- Genre: Filmi
- Occupation: Film playback singer
- Years active: 1933–1976

Shamshad Begum (Urdu: شمشاد بیگم, IAST: Śamśād Bēgam; 14 April 1919 – 23 April 2013) was an Indian singer who was one of the first playback singers in the Hindi film industry. Begum is regarded as one of the best and most popular female playback singers, and a pioneering figure in Hindi film music and was also one of the most influential playback singers during the "Golden Age" of Bollywood (1940s–1960s). Notable for her distinctive voice and range, she sang over 6,000 songs in Hindustani, Bengali, Marathi, Gujarati, Tamil, and Punjabi languages, among which 1287 were Hindi film songs. She worked with renowned composers of the time, such as Ghulam Haider who first discovered her. She also worked with Naushad Ali and O. P. Nayyar, for whom she was one of their favorites. Her songs from the 1940s to the early 1970s remain popular and continue to be remixed.

== Awards and recognition ==
- Padma Bhushan Award (2009)
- O. P. Nayyar Award (2009)

== Personal life ==
Shamshad Begum was born in Lahore, British India (present-day Pakistan) on 14 April 1919. the day after the Jallianwala Bagh massacre took place in nearby Amritsar. Though many records originally listed her birthplace as Amritsar, her daughter, Usha Ratra, clarified in a 2013 interview that Begum was born in Lahore into a conservative Punjabi Muslim family, noting that her father worked as a mechanic (mistry). She was one of eight children, five sons and three daughters, born to a conservative Punjabi Muslim family of limited means. Her father, Mian Hussain Baksh, worked as a mechanic and her mother, Ghulam Fatima, was a pious lady of conservative disposition, a devoted wife and mother who raised her children with traditional family values. Despite family objections, Shamshad Begum started singing at weddings and social events at the age of 12. During her initial recordings, her father insisted that she wear a burqa and not be photographed.

In 1932, the teenage Shamshad came in contact with Ganpat Lal Batto, a Hindu law student who lived in the same neighbourhood and who was several years older than her. In those days, marriages were performed while the bride and groom were very young, and Shamshad's parents were already looking out for a suitable partner for her. Their efforts were on the verge of bearing fruit in 1934, when Ganpat Lal Batto and Shamshad made the decision to marry each other. In 1934, despite strenuous opposition from both their families due to religious differences, 15-year-old Shamshad married Ganpat Lal Batto. The couple had but one child, a daughter named Usha Ratra, who in due course married a Hindu gentleman, Lieutenant Colonel Yogesh Ratra, an officer in the Indian Army.

Ganpat Lal Batto died in a road accident in 1955. His death left Shamshad deeply upset, as he had been the focus of her life and they were extremely devoted to each other. He had managed many aspects of her career and contracts, significantly boosting her professional development. Following his death, Shamshad became listless and lost the will to pursue her career, which subsequently declined sharply. Indeed, while Shamshad Begum was an outstanding and famous singer, she was always a wife and mother first — someone who instinctively prioritised her family over her career. She preferred to keep away from the public eye and business dealings, believing it improper for a woman to be involved in such matters.

After her husband's death, Shamshad Begum began living with her daughter and son-in-law in Mumbai, first in south Mumbai and later at Hiranandani Gardens. She gradually became a recluse and devoted herself entirely to her grandchildren, to the point that the general public was unaware of whether she was alive or dead. In 2004, a controversy erupted in the media, when several publications wrongly reported that Shamshad Begum had died a few years previously. Shamshad's family clarified in a press release that this was not so. Her self-imposed seclusion is remarkable, because during all those decades away from the public eye, her old songs remained popular with the public and were often played on Vividh Bharati and All India Radio.

== Career ==
=== 1924–40 ===
Begum's talent was first spotted by her principal when she was in primary school in 1924. Impressed by the quality of her voice, she was made head singer of classroom prayer. At 10, she started singing folk-based songs at religious functions and family marriages. She received no formal musical training. Her singing ambitions, which she held from 1929, met with opposition from her family. In 1931, when she was twelve, her uncle, who enjoyed qawwalis and ghazals, secretly took her to Jenophone (or Xenophone) Music Company for an audition with Lahore-based musician and composer, Ghulam Haider. Begum said in an interview, "I sang Bahadur Shah Zafar's (the poet-ruler) ghazal Mera yaar mujhe mile agar." An impressed Haider gave her a contract for twelve songs, with the same facilities provided to top singers. It was Begum's paternal uncle Aamir Khan<Tribune/> who convinced her father, Miyan Hussain Baksh, to allow her to sing. When she won a contract with a recording company, her father agreed to let her sing on the condition that she would record in a burka and not allow herself to be photographed. She earned 15 rupees per song and was awarded 5,000 on the completion of the contract on Xenophone. Xenophone was a renowned music recording company, patronised by the rich, and her popularity grew in elite circles in the early 1930s. Though she had won the Xenophone audition without having any formal music training, Hussain Bakshwale Sahab and later Ghulam Haider improved her singing skills between 1937 and 1939.

Her popular breakthrough came when she began singing on All India Radio (AIR) in Peshawar and Lahore from 1937. Producer Dalsukh Pancholi wanted her to act as well in a film he was producing. Begum readily agreed, gave a screen test and was selected. Her father became angry, when he found out and warned her that she would not be allowed to sing if she continued to harbour a desire to act. Begum promised her father that she would never appear before the camera. She continued to sing songs on the radio. She never posed for photographs, and few people saw her pictures between 1933 and the 1970s.

Shamshad Begum sang for AIR through her musical group 'The Crown Imperial Theatrical Company of Performing Arts', set up in Delhi. The then AIR Lahore helped her to enter the world of movies as they frequently broadcast her songs, which induced music directors to use her voice for their films. Begum also recorded naats and other devotional music for a couple of gramophone recording companies. Her crystal-clear voice caught the attention of sarangi maestro Hussain Bakshwale Saheb, who took her as his disciple.

=== 1941–45 ===
Film director Mehboob Khan brought Shamshad Begum to Mumbai after telling her husband 'I will take her to Mumbai and give her a flat, car, conveyance and even if four to six people accompany her, it's fine. Please let her come to Mumbai'. Her father was not convinced at first but later gave in as Shamshad wanted to come to Mumbai. Haider used her voice skilfully in some of his earlier films such as Khazanchi (1941) and Khandan (1942). By 1940, Begum was already well established on the radio. The songs "Cheechi Wich Pa ke Chhalla", "Mera Haal Vekh Ke" and "Kankaan Diyaan Faslaan" from Yamla Jatt of 1940 became a huge hit and popularised Pran, singer Begum and composer Haider. Haider continued to compose hit songs which Begum sang for films including Zamindar, Poonji and Shama. Khan used Begum's voice in Taqdeer (1943), where he introduced Nargis as the heroine. Begum was soon singing for other composers including Rafiq Ghaznavi, Ameer Ali, Pt. Gobindram, Pt. Amarnath, Bulo C. Rani, Rashid Atre and M. A. Mukhtar, in the pre-independence era.

When Haider moved to Bombay in 1944, Begum went with him as a member of his team, leaving behind her family and staying with her Chacha (paternal uncle) Aamir Khan who used to encourage her in her singing career. After partition, Haider migrated to Pakistan but Begum remained in Mumbai. She had no known Pakistani connection post 1947. Begum became a national star between the early 1940s and the early 1960s, having a voice different from her peers such as Noorjehan (also discovered by Haider), Mubarak Begum, Suraiya, Sudha Malhotra, Geeta Dutt and Amirbai Karnataki. Her peak period in the Hindi film industry was from 1940 to 1955.

=== 1946–55 ===
Begum sang extensively for composers including Naushad Ali, O. P. Nayyar, C. Ramchandra and S. D. Burman from 1946 to 1960. Naushad acknowledged in an interview that he was indebted to Begum in reaching the top, as she was famous before he became known in the late 1940s; after his tracks sung by her became highly popular, his talent was recognised. It was Begum's solo and duet songs sung for Naushad in the late 1940s and early 1950s which made Naushad famous. After Naushad became successful he recorded songs with new singers as well in the early 1950s, but kept working with Shamshad in the late 1950s and early 1960s. Naushad chose his favourite singer Begum once again to sing four out of the twelve songs in Mother India.

Begum is credited with singing one of the first Westernised songs, "Meri jaan...Sunday ke Sunday" by C. Ramchandra. She kept getting more offers to sing songs and was the highest paid female singer from 1940 to 1955 and again post Mother India in 1957 to 1964. In 1949, music directors S. Rajeswara Rao, M. D. Parthasarathy and Balakrishna Kalla asked her to sing "Jaiyo Jaiyo Shipayon Bazar" for P. Bhanumathi in the film Nishan, produced by Gemini Films of Madras, which became highly popular.

Although Burman started composing Bengali music in 1937, he achieved national fame with tracks sung by Begum in Hindi films. Burman was not well established as a music director in Hindi films until 1946; he then asked Begum to sing in his debut Hindi film as music director, Shikari (1946), with the song, "Kuch Rang Badal Rahi". In 1949, came Shabnam, in which Burman asked her to sing duets named "Pyar Main Tumne" and "Kismat Bhi Bhichadna" with Mukesh, which became popular. Shabnam was Burman's biggest hit to that date with Filmistan, and was especially noticeable for its multilingual song "Yeh Duniya Roop ki Chor", sung by Begum and acted by Kamini Kaushal, which became another hit. Burman subsequently asked her to sing tracks in Bazar, Mashaal, Bahar, Shahenshah, Miss India, and other films. The song "Jaam Tham Le" from Shahenshah was a trendsetter for Burman compositions.

Begum had met Nayyar during her radio stint in Lahore, when he worked as an office boy delivering cakes for the lead singers. In 1954, when Nayyar got a break as a composer, he approached Begum to record songs for Mangu. Nayyar described her voice as resembling a "temple bell" for its clarity of tone. He worked with her until the late 1960s and gave her many hit songs, including "Ab To Jee Hone Laga" from Mr. & Mrs. '55, "Main Jaan Gayi Tujhe" from Howrah Bridge, "Zara Pyar Karle" from Mangu, "Saiyan Teri Ankhon Mein" from 12' O Clock, "Thodasa Dil Lagana" from Musafirkhana, and many others.

Several of her songs from this period remain extremely popular, including those acted by Nigar Sultana, such as "Teri Mehfil Mein" from Mughal E Azam and Mere Piya Gaye Rangoon from Patanga (1949), as well as "Saiyan Dil Mein Aana Re", acted by Vyjayanthimala, and "Boojh Mera Naam Re", acted by Minoo Mumtaz. Milte Hi Aankhen Dil Hua Deewana Kisi Ka from Babul (1950) had a romantic duet with Talat Mahmood, acted by Dilip Kumar and Munawar Sultana, which also became popular. Her duet with Rafi, "Chhala Deja Nishani" from Bazar became a mega-hit.

In the late 1940s, Kishore Kumar and Madan Mohan sang as chorus boys for her songs at the Filmistan Studio. Begum promised at this time that she would sing songs composed by Mohan once he started his career as a music director and would accept a lower fee. She also predicted that Kumar would become a great playback singer. She later recorded duets with Kumar, including "Gori ke Nainon Mein Nindiya Bhari" from Angarey and "Meri Neendon Me Tum" from Naya Andaz.

=== 1955–76 ===
Shamshad was at the peak of her career right from 1941 to 1955 and was the most in demand female singer and highest paid female playback singer from 1940 to 1955. She was the lead singer for many films like Taqdeer, Humayun, Shahjehan, Anokhi Ada, Aag, Mela, Patanga, Babul, Bahar, Jadoo, Aan and more. But after her husband's accidental death in 1955, Begum became a recluse and stopped accepting singing assignments, including recordings, for a year. Though she had stopped recording for her songs in the year 1955 after her husband's death, the songs released between 1955 and early 1957 including songs from films such as CID, Naya Andaz, Baradari, Mr. & Mrs. '55 and other hits continued to be popular. At this juncture, Mehboob Khan approached her in 1957 and said he wanted a full-throated voice for Nargis in Mother India. The first song she sang after returning to her career was "Pee Ke Ghar Aaj Pyari Dulhaniya Chali" for Mother India. She made a successful comeback, and subsequently recorded many notable songs for films such as Howrah Bridge, Jaali Note, Love in Simla, Bewaqoof, Mughal-e-Azam, Bluff Master, Gharana and Rustom-E-Hind.

The well-known later playback singer, Lata Mangeshkar, started singing when Begum was at the peak of her career, with Begum's break after her husband's death boosting Mangeshkar's career and helping her get offers for high-quality songs. In the early careers of Mangeshkar, as well as her younger sister, Asha Bhosle, between 1944 and 1956, they had often been asked by producers and music directors to imitate Begum's style of singing, because producers could not afford Begum's fees. In their first song together, Mangeshkar was a part of the chorus while Begum was the main singer. Many of the songs sung by Lata like "Ayega Ayega" were sung in Shamshad Begum's style. Even Asha Bhosle's songs like her first duet with Kishore – "Aati Hai Yaad Humko" from the 1948 film Muqaddar bear direct resemblance to Shamshad Begum's style. From 1949 to 1960, beginning with the song "Dar Na Mohabbat Karle" from Andaz, Mangeshkar and Begum have sung many duets together, with the most famous being "Pyar Ke Jahan Ki" from the 1949 film Patanga, "Bachpan Ke Din" from 1951's Deedar; their last song together was Mughal-e-Azam's song "Teri Mehfil Mein Qismat" in 1960,Begum sang songs together with Mangeshkar and Bhosle, including "Mubarak Ho Woh Dil Jisko" from Benazir. It was between 1958 and 1963 that the career of Lata got a major boost as music directors started gradually preferring her soft voice. Until then, Geeta Dutt and Begum were the most preferred singers, but Shamshad Begum continued to be at the top from 1940 until 1963. From 1965, her songs started to be mimed by actresses other than the lead. Beginning in 1965, songs for her in films started getting reduced but the songs she sang instantly became hits through 1968. She then declared a self-imposed retirement in 1965. But she kept having certain composers asking her to sing songs in few films and among them her songs from films like in Daku Mangal Singh, Upkar, Kismat, Heer Ranjha, Johar Mehmood in Hong Kong, Teri Meri Ik Jindri and Main Papi Tum Bakhshanhaar. Her song "Kajra Mohabbat Wala" from the 1968 film Kismat and "Nathaniya Hale To Bada Maza" from the 1971 film Johar Mehmood in Hong Kong remains popular.

== Retirement and death ==
From the late 1980s, Begum started giving occasional interviews. In one of her interviews with Filmfare magazine in 2012, Begum disclosed, "The more hits I gave, the less work I got. When I helped new composers I never told them to give me all their songs to sing. I believed only God could give, not them." Her final interview was in 2012. In 2009, she was conferred with the prestigious O. P. Nayyar Award for her contribution to Hindi film music. Begum requested that the cash prize of ₹25,000 be donated to charity. The foundation subsequently directed the funds, along with additional sponsorships, to the Eklavya Child Education and Health Foundation.

She was also conferred the Padma Bhushan (India's third highest civilian award) in 2009. Later, her daughter Usha said in an interview, "Because of the politics in the industry, she didn't want to work any more. This is one of the reasons why she wouldn't let me be a singer. I told her, let me sing for my self-satisfaction, but she said if you learn to sing, you will directly enter the industry. So, she wouldn't let me do so."

Begum died at her Mumbai residence on the night of 23 April 2013 after a prolonged illness. She was 94. Her funeral was held the following morning in Andheri East; it was a private ceremony attended by close family members and a few friends, reflecting her lifelong preference for a low-key personal life. Despite her Muslim heritage, she had requested that her last rites be performed according to Hindu customs, following her marriage to Ganpat Lal Batto, and she was subsequently cremated. She was cremated in a small, dignified ceremony.

Information and Broadcasting minister, Manish Tewari said, "The film industry has lost one of its most versatile singers. Shamshadji's style of singing set new benchmarks. Her melodious voice with powerful lyrics gave us songs that have remained popular even today." Prime Minister Manmohan Singh said, "She was an artist of extraordinary talent and abilities, and the songs she has left behind in her long career, which she started with AIR in 1937, will continue to enthral music lovers." Her death was also mourned by the highest echelons of the Indian film industry. Megastar Amitabh Bachchan paid tribute via social media, stating, "The golden voice of Shamshad Begum, playback singer of great eminence in some of the most historic film songs... now silent. RIP." Lata Mangeshkar, who began her career when Begum was the industry's leading voice and later recorded numerous duets with her, expressed deep personal sadness. Mangeshkar tweeted, "I was very sad to hear the news of her demise. I had worked with her in several films; she was a very nice, cheerful, and simple human being." Film historian Raju Bharatan noted that despite the industry gossip of rivalry during the 1950s, the two shared a "melodious partnership," most notably in their final collaboration, "Teri Mehfil Mein Qismat Azmakar" from Mughal-e-Azam (1960).

== Legacy ==
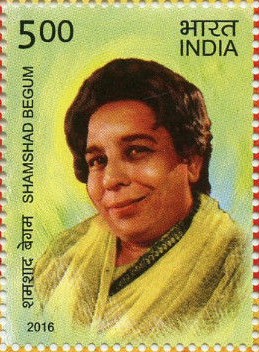
Begum on a 2016 stamp of India

In 2016, India Post honored Begum's foundational contributions to Indian music by issuing a commemorative postage stamp featuring her portrait. She was included in the "Legendary Singers of India" series, which also recognized artists such as Mohammed Rafi, Kishore Kumar, and Geeta Dutt.

Begum's death coincided with the centenary celebrations of Indian cinema in 2013, leading to her inclusion in nationwide tributes that underscored her status as one of the industry's earliest playback icons. In addition to radio specials and musical concerts replaying her hits, her 100th birth centenary in 2019 was marked by numerous retrospectives celebrating her repertoire of over 1,600 songs.

Her duet with Lata Mangeshkar, "Teri Mehfil Mein Qismat Azmakar" from K. Asif's Mughal-e-Azam (1960), has seen a resurgence in popularity through social media platforms such as YouTube and Instagram from late 2023. This digital trend has introduced her vocal style to younger generations, often through remixes and viral short-form videos.

Her career milestones were further documented in the 2024 Doordarshan Urdu series Parwaz-e-Niswan, which profiled her as a foundational figure in South Asian music.

While her voice remains widely recognized in popular culture, contemporary audiences often engage with her music without being familiar with her biographical identity.

Her daughter Usha Ratra said, "She kept herself away from glamour of the industry despite being one of the top singers of her era as she did not like the limelight. My mother used to say that artistes never die. She wanted to be remembered for her songs."

== Selected songs ==
- Paigham Saba Lai Hai Gulzar-e-Nabi Se, Aaya Hai Bulawa Mujhay Darbar-e-Nabi Se – Shamshad Begum's debut as a playback singer from Radio Lahore, British India by her mentor, music director Ghulam Haider with this Na'at song in 1937
- "Leke Pehla Pehla Pyar", "Kahin Pe Nigahein Kahin Pe Nishana", "Boojh Mera Kya Naam Re" – C.I.D.; (Music: O.P. Nayyar)
- Savan Ke Nazare Hain – Khazanchi; (Music: Ghulam Haider) (her debut film)
- Hum Dard Ka Afsana – Dard
- Jab Usne Geisu Bikhraye, Badal Aaya Jhoom Ke – Shahjehan (1946) (Music: Naushad)
- Main Bhawara Tu Hai Phool (Duet with Mukesh) – Mela; (Music: Naushad)
- Chandni Aayi Ban Ke Pyar – Dulari (1949)
- Na Bol Pi Pi More Aangna – Dulari (1949) – (Music: Naushad)
- Milte Hi Aankhen Dil Hua Deewana Kisi Ka- (Duet with Talat Mehmood) – Babul (1950); (Music: Naushad Ali)
- Chali Chali Kaisi Yeh Hawa Yeh, (Duet with Usha Mangeshkar) –
- Bluffmaster (1965); (Music: Kalyanji Anandji)
- Kabhi Aar Kabhi Paar Laga Teer-e-Nazar, (Aar Paar 1954), (music: O.P. Nayyar)
- O Gaadiwale – Mother India 1957; (Music: Naushad)
- "Ye duniya roop ki chor" – Shabnam 1949; (Music: S.D.Burman)
- Mere Piya Gaye Rangoon – Patanga (1949); (Music C. Ramchandra)
- "Ek Tera Sahara" – Shama 1946; (Music: Master Ghulam Haider)
- "Holi Aayee Re Kanhaai" – Mother India (1957); (Music: Naushad)
- "Haaye Ni Mera Baalam Haai Bara Zalim" and "Teri kanak di rakhi"-Do Lachhian (1960) Punjabi Movie
- "Naina Bhar Aye Neer" – Humayun (1945); (Music: Master Ghulam Haider)
- "Nazar Phero Na Humse" – (Duet with G M Durani) – Deedar (1951); (Music: Naushad)
- Mohabbat Choomay Jinke Haath, Jawani Paaon Pare Din Raat – Aan (1952 film); (Music: Naushad)
- Chod Babul Ka Ghar – Babul 1950; (Music: Naushad)
- Badi Mushkil Se Dil Ki Beqarari Ko Qarar Aaya – Naghma 1953; (Music: Nashad (not to be confused with Naushad); (Lyrics: Shaukat Dehlavi)
- "Kajra Mohabbatwala Ankhiyon Mein Aisa Dala" (Duet with Asha Bhosle) – Kismat (1968); (Music: O.P. Nayyar)
- "Meri Neendon Main Tum" (Duet with Kishore Kumar) – Naya Andaz 1956; (Music: O.P.Nayyar)
- Teri Mehfil Mein Qismat Aazma Kar Hum Bhi Deikhain Gaen (Duet with Lata Mangeshkar) – Mughal-E-Azam 1960; (Music:Naushad)
- "Pyar Ke Jahan Ki Nirali" (Duet with Lata Mangeshkar) – Patanga; (Music: C. Ramchandra)
- Saiyan Dil Mein Aana Re – Bahar 1951; (Music: S.D.Burman)
- "Reshmi Salwar Kurta Jaali Da" – Naya Daur 1957; (Music: O.P.Nayyar)
- "Kisike Dil Mein Rehna Tha" – Babul 1950 – with Lata; (Music:Naushad)
- Dharti Ko Aakash Pukare – Mela (1948) – with Mukesh; (Music: Naushad)
- Ek Do Teen Aaja Mausam Hai Rangeen – Awaara (1951); (Music: Shankar-Jaikishen)
- "Dil eechak beechak gurr" – "Bawre Nain" 1950 – (Music:Roshan)
- Chali Pee Ke Nagar, Abb Kaahe Ka Darr – Mirza Ghalib (1954)
- Chhodo Chhodo Ji Baiyyan Mori, Mein Naazuk Chhori – Bara Dari (1955) – (Music: Nashad)
- Sandook Mein Bandook Hai, Bandook Mein Goli – Hoor-e-Arab (1955) – (Music: Ghulam Mohammed
- Door Koi Gaye, Dhunn Yeh Sunaaey – "Baiju Bawra (1952), (Music: Naushad)
- "Chaman Mein Reheke Veerana Mera Dil Hota Jaata Hai" – "Deedar" 1951 – (Music :Naushad)
- "Rahe haath men haath" - "Tarang" (in duet with Chitragupta) 1952 - (Music : Chitragupta)
