= Jaddanbai =

Indian actress

- Born: Jaddanbai; 1 April 1892; Benares, Benares State, British India (present-day Varanasi, Uttar Pradesh, India)
- Died: 8 April 1949 (aged 57); Bombay, Bombay State, India (present-day Mumbai, Maharashtra, India)
- Resting place: Chandanwadi Cemetery, Mumbai
- Other names: Jaddanbai Hussain and Jayadevi
- Occupations: Actress; Composer; Singer; Music director; Director; Producer; Dancer; Writer
- Years active: 1897–1949
- Spouses: Narottamdas Khatri; Irshad Meer Khan; Mohanchand Uttamchand Tyagi (Abdul Rashid)
- Children: Akhtar Hussain (eldest child from her first marriage); Anwar Hussain (child from her second marriage); Nargis Dutt (her child from her third marriage)
- Relatives: Priya Dutt (granddaughter); Sanjay Dutt (grandson); Sunil Dutt (son-in-law); Dutt family

Jaddanbai or Jaddanbai Hussain (1 April 1892 – 8 April 1949) was an Indian singer, music composer, dancer, actress, filmmaker, and one of the pioneers of Indian cinema.

She along with Bibbo and Saraswati Devi were one of the first female music composers in Indian cinema.

She was the mother of actor Anwar Hussain and the well-known Hindi film actress Nargis, and the maternal grandmother of Priya Dutt and Sanjay Dutt.

== Early life ==
Jaddanbai was born around 1892 to Mian Jaan and Daleepabai and was brought up as a Muslim by her mother and her Muslim stepfather, Mian Jaan. Mian Jaan died when she was five. Daleepabai was a well known tawaif (courtesan) of Allahabad. Jaddanbai grew up in Calcutta and later approached Calcutta's Shrimant Ganpat Rao ("Bhaiya Saheb Scindia") and became his student. Shrimant Ganpat Rao died in 1920 while she was still a student. She then completed her training under Ustad Moinuddin Khan, a Hindustani classical singer and thumri specialist. Later she also trained with Ustad Chaddu Khan Saheb, Ustad Laab Khan Saheb and Barkat Ali Khan (brother of Bade Ghulam Ali Khan).

== Career ==
Her music became popular and she became an even more famous tawaif than her mother. She began recording ghazals with the Columbia Gramophone Company. She started participating in music sessions and was invited by the rulers of many princely states such as Rampur, Bikaner, Gwalior, Jammu and Kashmir, Indore, and Jodhpur to perform mehfils. She had also rendered songs and ghazals at various radio stations nationwide.

She later began acting when the Play Art Photo Tone Company of Lahore approached her for a role in their movie Raja Gopichand in 1933. She played the role of the mother of the title character. Later she worked for a Karachi based film company, in Insaan ya Shaitan (1935). In Naachwali (1934), she introduced her daughter under the screen name Baby Rani.

She worked in two more movies, Prem Pariksha (1934) and Seva Sadan (1935), before starting her own production company called Sangeet Films; producing, directing, writing, and composing the music. Becoming one of the first female music composers in Hindi cinema. The company produced Talashe Haq in 1935, in which she acted and composed the music. In 1936 she acted in, directed, and wrote the music for Madam Fashion, in which she introduced Suraiya.

== Personal life ==
Her first marriage was to a wealthy Gujarati Hindu businessman Narottam Das Khatri ("Bachhubhai" or "Bachi Babu"). Khatri converted to Islam upon marriage and together they had a son, Akhtar Hussain.

Her second marriage was to harmonium master Ustad Irshad Meer Khan, her harmonium and tabla teacher and a frequent collaborator, with whom she had her second son, actor Anwar Hussain.

Her third marriage was to Mohanchand Uttamchand Tyagi ("Mohan Babu"), a wealthy heir from Rawalpindi, who converted to Islam upon marriage and took up the name of Abdul Rashid. 'Mohan Babu', her third husband, had earlier fallen in love with Jaddanbai. He proposed marriage. Jaddanbai was ready for this marriage only if he first embraced Islam which he did. The conversion ceremony was reportedly conducted by Maulana Abul Kalam Azad. Film actress Nargis (née Fatima Rashid) was their daughter. Jaddanbai is the mother-in-law of Sunil Dutt and maternal grandmother of Priya and Sanjay Dutt.

== Filmography ==
=== Films ===
Year	Film	Role	Notes
1933	Raja Gopichand		Debut
1934	Prem Pariksha		
1934	Naachwali		
1935	Talashe Haq	Feeroza	actress Nargis had her debut in this film as a child artist
1935	Insaan Ya Shaitaan		
1935	Seva Sadan		
1936	Madam Fashion	Sheela Devi	
1936	Hriday Manthan		
1943	Taqdeer		

=== Composer ===
Year	Film	Role	Notes
1935	Talashe Haq	Composer	Becomes one of the First Female Music Composers in Indian Cinema (after actress Bibbo, who composed the music for Adal-e-Jahangir in 1934.)
1936	Madam Fashion	Composer	She acted in the film
1936	Hriday Manthan	Composer	
1937	Moti Ka Haar	Composer	Writer, director

=== Writer ===
Year	Film	Role	Notes
1935	Talashe Haq	Writer	She also acted in the film
1936	Madam Fashion	Writer	She acted in the film
1936	Hriday Manthan	Writer	Screenplay
1937	Moti Ka Haar	Writer	Screenplay
1949	Darogaji	Writer	as Bai Jaddan Bai

=== Director ===
Year	Film	Role	Notes
1936	Madam Fashion	Director	She also acted in the film
1936	Hriday Manthan	Director	
1937	Moti Ka Haar	Director	
1937	Jeevan Swapna	Director	as Bai Jaddanbai

=== Producer ===
Year	Film	Role	Notes
1936	Madam Fashion	Producer	She also acted in the film
1936	Hriday Manthan	Producer	Sangeet Films
1937	Moti Ka Haar	Producer	Sangeet Films
1937	Jeevan Swapna	Producer	Director

== See also ==
- Tawaif
- Nautch
