= Nargis Dutt Foundation =

Indian cancer foundation

- Abbreviation: NDF
- Formation: 1981
- Type: Non-governmental organization
- Legal status: Active
- Headquarters: Mumbai, India
- Region served: Worldwide
- Founder: Sunil Dutt
- Key people: Priya Dutt Chairperson & Trustee; Sanjay Dutt Trustee
- Parent organization: Nargis Dutt Memorial Charitable Trust (NDMCT)
- Website: nargisduttfoundation.com

The Nargis Dutt Foundation (NDF), also known as Nargis Dutt Cancer Foundation, is a non-governmental organization, founded in 1981. It is headquartered in Mumbai, India.

The organization works toward health care, disaster relief, women's empowerment, education and sports. It has equipped 80-100 hospitals across rural India with medical equipment and camps and E learning system in rural schools.

== History ==
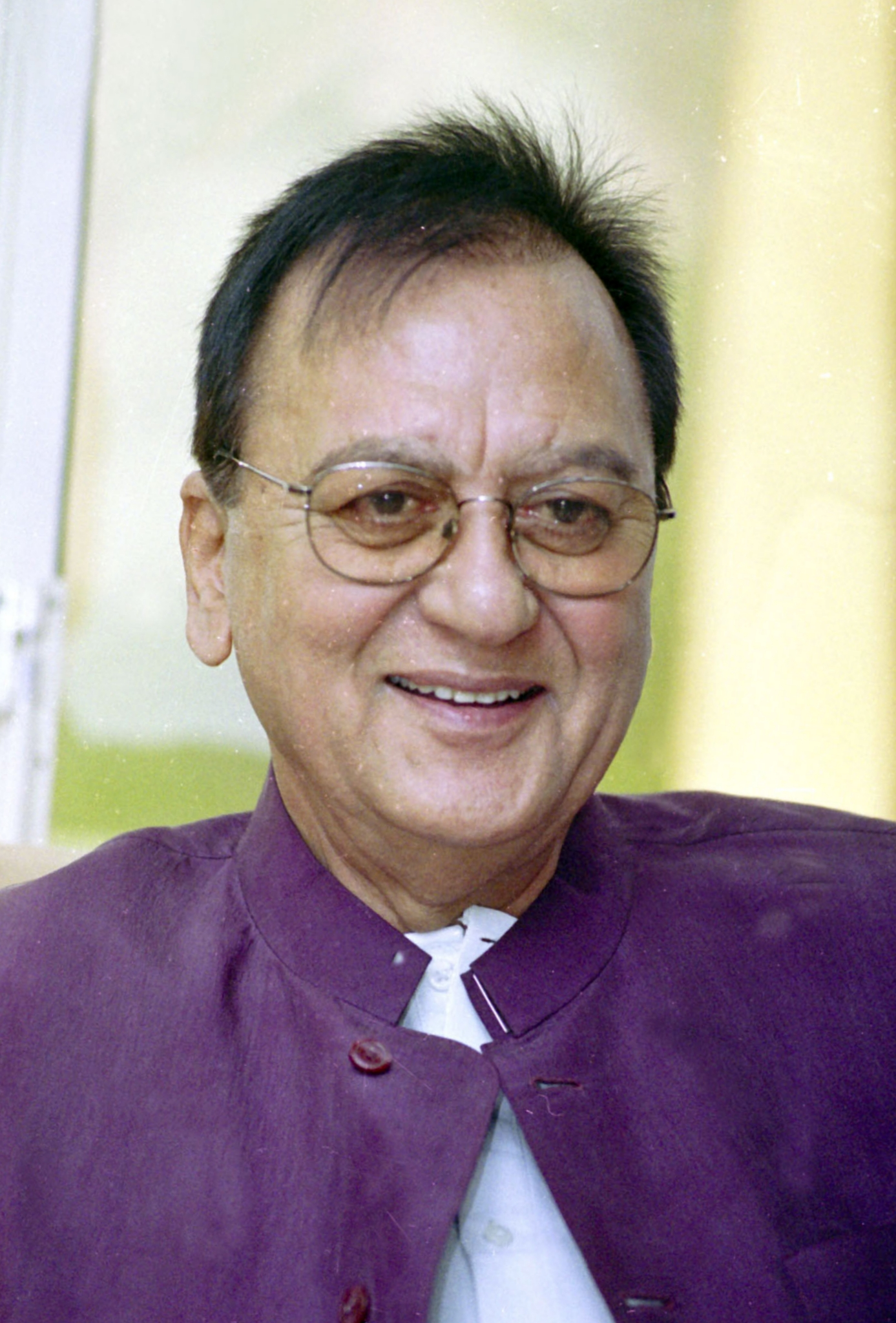
Sunil Dutt, an Indian actor-politician, who later served as the Union Minister of Youth Affairs and Sports (India), founded the Nargis Dutt Foundation in memory of Nargis (actress) for the curing of cancer patients in 1981.

The Nargis Dutt Foundation was first established in 1981 in New York City by legendary actor Sunil Dutt in memory of his wife and legendary actress Nargis Dutt, who died of cancer in 1981, and the foundation had been working in the area of Health and Education. Nargis Dutt Foundation had been engaged in spreading cancer awareness and knowledge, organising free screening camps in rural areas of country. The foundation is also engaged in financially and holistically supporting needy cancer patients with their treatments especially in TATA Memorial Hospital and equipping rural hospitals with medical diagnostic equipment. The foundation had also collaborated with Apollo Hospital, Tata Memorial, NM Medical and Asian Cancer Institute for excellence in offering cancer screening packages wherein patients can register themselves to avail service benefits. Additionally, Life Insurance Corporation and HDFC Cargo are also offering attractive insurance packages specific to cancer.

As of May 2005, It has 20 chapters worldwide of which about a dozen are in the United States including at Seattle, Portland, San Francisco, Los Angeles, Palm Spring, Las Vegas, Houston, Florida, Chicago, New York City, Detroit and Boston.

The Nargis Dutt Foundation financed the first fully air-conditioned Intensive care unit at Tata Memorial Hospital, the "Nargis Dutt Intensive Care Unit". It also runs a hospital named, Nargis Dutt Memorial Cancer Hospital at Barshi in Sholapur District of Maharashtra.

== Activities ==
In September 2018, Nargis Dutt Foundation along with Grameen Sneh Foundation organized heath camps in remote areas of Bihar to spread the awareness about cancer.

In February 2017, NDF launched an initiative called "My Hair For Cancer" to help cancer patients battle hair loss due to chemotherapy. Richfeel, a Haircare brand, and Nargis Dutt Foundation announced the launch of their social cause campaign 'My Hair for Cancer' to help cancer patients fight cancer and loss of self-esteem due to loss of hair during chemotherapy and radiotherapy, and through this initiative both companies invited public to come forward and donate their hair for patients fighting the disease. The event kicked off from Kala Ghoda festival in Mumbai and was held from 4 February to 12 February 2017 and also included an art installation at the festival that depicts the fight against the stigma associated with cancer detection.

In July 2017, In collaboration with The South African Consulate, the foundation distributed packaged hygiene kits to school girls that contained sanitary napkins, soap, hand towel and sanitizer in Mumbai, on the occasion of Nelson Mandela International Day.

In January 2019 Nargis Dutt Foundation has provided three ophthalmic equipment to KLSM Rotary Eye & ENT Hospital Udhampur to treat the patients living in far-flung areas of Udhampur and its surrounding districts. The equipment included Nidek Autoref- Keratometer, Welch Allyn Spot Vision Screener and I-Care Handheld Portable Tonometer.

== Awards ==
In October 2016, Nargis Dutt Foundation received the Award For Fight Against Cervical cancer by American Cancer Society and Women Deliver. On 6 June 2025, the Foundation commemorated the birth anniversary of its founder Sunil Dutt by felicitating the recipients of the "Sunil Dutt Scholarship", which is awarded to academically meritorious students from financially disadvantaged backgrounds.

== See also ==
- List of non-governmental organizations in India
- Non-governmental organisations in India
