= Madam Fashion =

1936 Indian film

- Directed by: Jaddanbai
- Produced by: Sangeet Movietone
- Starring: Jaddanbai; Baby Rani (Nargis); Miss Suraiya
- Music by: Jaddanbai
- Release date: 1936
- Country: India
- Language: Hindi

Madam Fashion is a 1936 Indian Hindi-language film produced under the banner of Sangeet Movietone. It was directed by Jaddanbai, who also composed its music and played the lead role. Other members of the cast included Ansari, Baby Rani (Nargis), Ashik Hussein, P. Bose, Misra, Yusuf, and Miss Suraiya.

Madam Fashion formed part of a transnational "fallen woman" melodrama tradition prominent in late 1920s and early 1930s cinema, in which female characters who transgressed social and sexual conventions were often subjected to moral punishment. The film was framed as a critique of "fashion fanaticism" and Westernised modernity. Its song booklet, introduced by Jaddanbai, warned that blind imitation of Western fashions would lead to the moral and financial ruin of Indian citizens and called upon Indian women to emulate the "saintly women of yore" as dutiful wives and model mothers.

According to scholar Debashree Mukherjee, Madam Fashion also formed part of the socially oriented cinema of the 1930s that negotiated competing ideas of modernity and tradition under colonial rule. While its protagonists could embody global ideals of fashion and progress, they were also expected to resist foreign influences. In this context, Madam Fashion portrayed Western fashion and cosmopolitan lifestyles as potentially destructive imports, contrasting with films such as Hunterwali (1935) and Nirmala (1938), which presented aspects of modernity more positively.

== Plot ==
The film follows Sheila (Jaddanbai), a wealthy, middle-aged mother of two whose husband, Seth Amarnath, takes her on several trips abroad and buys her fashionable goods. She becomes a "Society lady", developing a fascination with Western fashion and high society. Sheila attends races, shops abroad and hosts yacht parties, but after losing money at the races, she accepts help from a man she had previously met in Germany, named Jagdish, whom Amarnath recognizes as a swindler. When Amarnath accuses her of having an affair with Jagdish and demands that she remain confined to the home, Sheila rejects his demand, complaining of the quarrels, harassment and nagging she has endured. She leaves the household after bidding farewell to her sleeping children and packing her jewellery. Her departure causes her son's wedding to be called off, while her young daughter wanders the streets looking for her. Sheila initially remains cheerful and continues her fashionable lifestyle, but eventually falls into debt, is forced to submit to her creditors and is reduced to beggary.

== Cast ==
- Jaddanbai as Sheila
- Ansari
- Baby Rani (Nargis)
- Ashik Hussein
- P. Bose
- Misra
- Yusuf
- Miss Suraiya
