= Anjuman (1948 film) =

- Directed by: Akhtar Hussain
- Starring: Nargis; P. Jairaj
- Production company: Nargis Art Concern
- Release date: 1948
- Country: India
- Language: Hindi

Anjuman is a 1948 Indian Hindi-language film directed by Akhtar Hussain, and produced under the banner of Nargis Art Concern. The film stars Nargis and P. Jairaj, along with a supporting cast that includes Durga Khote, Anwar Hussain, Chandabai, and Neelam. Its music was composed by Bulo C Rani. The Times of India reviewed Anjuman on 13 August 1949.

Anjuman has sometimes been confused with Romeo and Juliet (1947), an unrelated production also directed by Hussain and starring Nargis.
