= Raat Aur Din =

- Directed by: Satyen Bose
- Written by: Satyen Bose
- Produced by: Jaffer Hussain
- Starring: Pradeep Kumar; Nargis; Feroz Khan; K N Singh; Leela Mishra; Anoop Kumar; Harindranath Chattopadhyay; Anwar Hussan
- Music by: Shankar Jaikishan; Hasrat Jaipuri (Lyrics); Shailendra (Lyrics)
- Distributed by: A A N Production
- Release date: 1967
- Country: India
- Language: Hindi

Raat Aur Din (lit. 'Night and Day') is a 1967 Indian Hindi-language psychological film directed by Satyen Bose. The leading actress, Nargis, won the National Film Award for Best Actress for her role as Varuna, a married woman who has dissociative identity disorder. By day, she is a typical Hindu homemaker, whilst at night she calls herself Peggy and walks the streets of Calcutta. The film won critical acclaim for its story and Nargis' performance as Varuna. Over the years it has developed a cult following. This film marked Nargis' final film appearance.

== Plot ==
Once, during a late night a woman named Varuna goes to a club and dances with an unknown club man named Dilip. He mentions meeting Varuna in Shimla before, but she denies ever being in Shimla. Meanwhile, her husband Pratap follows her. Upon confronting her, she says her name is Peggy and denies ever being married to him, and soon leaves. The next morning, back at the house Pratap again confronts Varuna about the previous night, but she denies ever leaving the house; meanwhile, Dilip arrives and confesses to being in the club with Varuna.

At a clinic, the doctors say that it might be DID (dissociative identity disorder), but are unsure until they know about her past. Pratap tells that once he was going to Shimla, when his car broke down and was forced to stay at Varuna's house, during which both fell in love. But once the car was fixed, Pratap left as he was going to Simla for marriage approval, but doesn't accept and returns to Varuna and get married, much to the disapproval of Pratap's mother. After this, Varuna frequently gets headaches and at night would dance to loud music. Once at a picnic, a boulder slides down a cliff, which triggers some childhood memories of Varuna and she screams. Her mother-in-law arranges a witch doctor, believing Varuna is under Voodoo, but is unsuccessful. Things become a bit better on holidays, but at a party at home, Varuna drinks alcohol. The next day, Pratap leaves town for an emergency but after coming back, finds someone is heavily drinking alcohol, but couldn't reach a conclusion. Then comes the night when Varuna goes out in the club and dances with Dilip.

In present, a few days later the doctors tell Varuna is sick and is admitted to a mental institute to have her treatment, but her DID keeps getting out of control and she would leave the institute. The doctors would follow and she displays both Varuna and Peggy simultaneously, but then completely loses her mind. Later, she gets shock treatment, but it's unsuccessful. She would then walk on the streets at night and would sing. She comes to a random house in the rain and gets unconscious. The woman in the house says that Varuna is pregnant, but it is Peggy on the mind and denies being married and asks for an abortion, but the woman doesn't know how. After some time, when Varuna wakes up, she is Varuna and the woman again tells her about being pregnant. At this time, Varuna realizes that whatever she was denying was all true and knows she has DID. She returns home, but her mother-in-law doesn't allow, claiming she is unfaithful. Varuna then meets a minor road accident and is hospitalized. Pratap and Varuna's father come, but she is in shock and couldn't figure out anything. Something triggers her mind when a nurse drops a tray. The doctors ask Varuna's father to tell about Varuna's past. In the past, Varuna's father was a heavy gambler and would abuse his wife. His wife leaves for Shimla with Varuna.

At Shimla it all comes to Varuna and she reveals what happened in Simla. After leaving, Varuna's mother would keep Varuna isolated, but Varuna secretly befriends a neighbor girl named Peggy. Peggy is a very sweet girl who dances with loud music, which makes Varuna want to dance also. Her mother would get harsh if she found Varuna talking to Peggy. Once grown, Varuna leaves the house and goes a Christmas party secretly. There is also Dilip sitting and watching. Once she leaves the party, Varuna's mother finds out and says she is not her daughter anymore and is angry, but slides down a cliff and dies. Varuna blames herself for her mother death. The doctor informs that this trauma caused Varuna to hate herself and make a new personality named Peggy because she yearned for her lifestyle, which caused her DID in the first place. In the end, the doctors reveal her mother died of heart failure, by which she lost balance and died falling off the cliff, and Varuna is cured after hearing and regaining self-confidence in her Varuna personality.

== Cast ==
- Nargis as Varuna alias Peggy
- Pradeep Kumar as Pratap
- Feroz Khan as Dilip
- K. N. Singh
- Leela Mishra as Pratap's Mother
- Anoop Kumar as Dr. Alvares
- Harindranath Chattopadhyay as Doctor
- Anwar Hussain as Doctor
- Laxmi Chhaya as Peggy
- S. N. Banerjee as Pratap's father
- Sulochana Chatterjee as Jamuna
- Ruby Mayer as Mrs Michelle
- Harindranath Chattopadhyay as Dr. Dey

== Production ==
Nargis had retired from films after Mother India (1957) to marry her co-star Sunil Dutt the following year and start a family. Her brother Jaffer Hussain lured her back to do this film, as he was the producer who was going through a difficult time, and she decided to help him, with the support of her husband. Shooting began in 1960 when Nargis was pregnant with her second child Namrata. It took six years before the film was completed, due to paucity of funds and was released in 1967, during which time Nargis had already had her third and last child Priya a year earlier.

== Soundtrack ==
The film's music was given by Shankar-Jaikishen, with lyrics by Shailendra and Hasrat Jaipuri.

#	Title	Singer(s)	Lyricist(s)
1	"Na Chhedo Kal Ke Afsane"	Lata Mangeshkar	Shailendra
2	"Raat Aur Din Diya Jale"	Mukesh	Hasrat Jaipuri
3	"Raat Aur Din Diya Jale"	Lata Mangeshkar	Hasrat Jaipuri
4	"Jeena Hamko Raas Na Aaya"	Lata Mangeshkar	Shailendra
5	"Aawara Ae Mere Dil (Sad)"	Lata Mangeshkar	Shailendra
6	"Jagat Mein Koi Na Tera Mera"	Bhupinder	Kamlesh Verma
7	"Phool Sa Chehra"	Mohammed Rafi	Hasrat Jaipuri
8	"Aawara Ae Mere Dil"	Lata Mangeshkar	Shailendra
9	"Dil Ki Girah Khol Do"	Lata Mangeshkar, Manna Dey	Shailendra

== Awards ==
Won

- 1968: National Film Award for Best Actress – Nargis

Nominated

- 1969: Filmfare Best Actress Award – Nargis
