= Mala (1941 film) =

- Directed by: Mahendra Thakore; Paidi Jairaj
- Starring: Rose; Paidi Jairaj; Jayant
- Release date: 1941
- Country: India
- Language: Hindi

Mala is a Bollywood drama film. It was released in 1941. It was directed jointly by Mahendra Thakore and Paidi Jairaj and had Rose, Paidi Jairaj himself and Jayant in pivotal roles.
