= Poonam Mahajan =

Indian politician (born 1980)

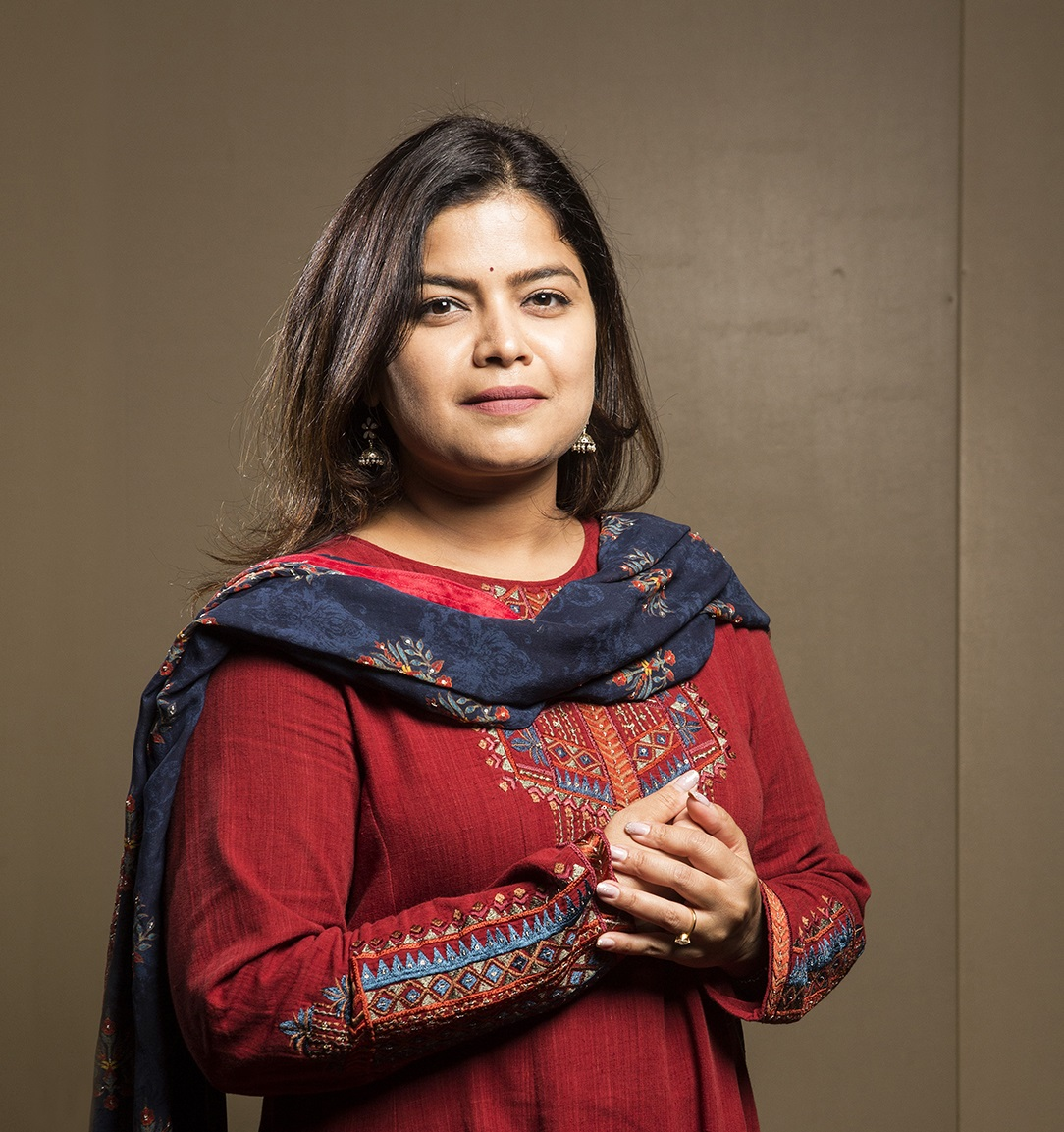
- Mahajan in 2017

Member of Parliament, Lok Sabha
- In office 16 May 2014 – 4 June 2024
- Preceded by: Priya Dutt
- Succeeded by: Varsha Gaikwad
- Constituency: Mumbai North Central

President of Bharatiya Janata Yuva Morcha
- In office 16 December 2016 – 26 September 2020
- Preceded by: Anurag Thakur
- Succeeded by: Tejasvi Surya

Personal details
- Born: 9 December 1980 (age 45) Mumbai, Maharashtra, India
- Party: Bharatiya Janata Party
- Spouse: Anand Rao
- Children: 2
- Parent(s): Pramod Mahajan (father); Rekha Mahajan (mother)
- Relatives: Rahul Mahajan (Brother)
- Occupation: Politician
- Website: poonammahajan.in

Poonam Mahajan (born 9 December 1980) is an Indian politician and a former Member of Parliament, Lok Sabha from Mumbai North Central, Constituency, Maharashtra. She is a member of the Bharatiya Janata Party (BJP). She has served as the National President of Bharatiya Janata Yuva Morcha (BJYM), the youth wing of the BJP, from December 2016 to September 2020. Mahajan was the President of the Basketball Federation of India, the first female to hold this position. In addition, she currently serves as Chair of the Maharashtra State Animal Welfare Board.

== Early life ==
Mahajan was born in Mumbai to mother, Rekha Mahajan and father, the veteran BJP leader, Pramod Mahajan, who died in 2006. She is the second child of her parents, having an elder brother, Rahul Mahajan.

She became actively involved in politics from 2006.

== Career ==
=== Political ===
After her father's death, Poonam Mahajan formally entered politics on 30 October 2006 by becoming a primary member of the BJP at the age of 26. In April of the following year, she was appointed as the General Secretary for Bharatiya Janata Yuva Morcha, Maharashtra unit.

In 2009, Mahajan contested her first election and lost the Assembly Elections from Ghatkopar against Ram Kadam of Maharashtra Navnirman Sena. Following this defeat, she continued working with the party in her organisational capacity and was appointed the National Vice President of the Bharatiya Janata Yuva Morcha, in 2010.

Prior to the general elections in 2014, with an eye on strengthening the organisation, Mahajan was appointed as the National Secretary of the BJP in 2013. In the following year, she was given a ticket for the Lok Sabha elections from Mumbai North Central, which was considered to be a stronghold of the Congress. The seat had never been won by the BJP since independence. Mahajan rose to national prominence by winning against two-time Lok Sabha member, incumbent MP, Priya Dutt, by a margin of 1.86 lakh votes.

Given her performance in Parliament and her appeal amongst youth, in 2016 she took a national leadership position in BJP organisation as the National President of Bharatiya Janata Yuva Morcha (BJYM), the youth wing of the BJP.

In 2019, Mahajan was given the ticket to contest from Mumbai North Central once again, which she won comfortably, beating her opponent Priya Dutt by a margin of 1.30 lakh votes.

=== Non political ===
==== Animal welfare and environment protection ====
Mahajan is known to have an interest in animal welfare. She has also been an active contributor to issues related to environmental conservation and protection.

Mahajan also serves as a patron and mentor to Swachhalay, a youth-driven non-profit organisation working to support PM Shri Narendra Modi’s Swachh Bharat Mission (SWB). In 2016, Mahajan co-founded Mumbai Youth Forum, a youth-led non-profit that seeks to encourage greater collaboration between young people and elected representatives/policymakers, through the creation of a platform with the aim of promoting democratic values and inclusion.

==== Global Citizen Festival India ====
Mahajan played a key role in bringing the Global Citizen Festival to India, which was headlined by Coldplay and Jay-Z and was held at MMRDA Grounds, BKC in her constituency. This charity concert was the largest entertainment event ever held in India with over 80,000+ people in attendance. Over INR 43 crores were raised as commitments from government, corporations, social influencers and development partners towards achieving the UN Sustainable Development Goals, which special emphasis on providing quality education, enabling gender equality, ending open defecation and providing clean drinking water to the people of India. These commitments are set to impact the lives of over 51.6 crore citizens.

==== Elephant Parade India ====
Mahajan also served as the Parade Ambassador for the Elephant Parade of India, India's largest public exhibition. 101 five-foot elephants painted by celebrated artists were on display at the Gateway of India. Elephant Family along with the Wildlife Trust of India, through this parade, seeks to raise funds for the creation of 101 safe corridors for elephants. The Parade was supported by Royal Patrons, The Prince of Wales and The Duchess of Cornwall.

She has also worked with the non-profit Kranti to provide quality education and a better life to the children of sex workers.

== 2019 Campaign ==
=== Social media campaigning ===
Ahead of 2019 Lok Sabha elections, Mahajan ran one of the most innovative social media political campaigns in the country. Her team included many first time voters from across the country which were brought on board through a volunteer network campaign she launched on Instagram. According to Mid-Day, she received over 3,000 applications from across the nation within a day, with many young people applying to volunteer their time for her campaign. Under the hashtag #PoonamPhirSe, Mahajan tried to woo the young first time voters of her constituency by launching innovative campaigns like #AskPoonam on Instagram, where followers asked her everything from why slums near Mumbai airport are not a concern for her to how she juggles her role as a mother of two with that of being an MP. Her ‘young’ war room filled with first time voters received a lot of media coverage during election season. The young team launched ‘millennial’ merchandise, fusing pop culture with modern-day politics, to attract young first-time voters in Mumbai. T-shirts and other paraphernalia like pop sockets were distributed with printed content with millennial cultural references from sources like Game of thrones, Harry Potter and Star Wars.

=== First-time voter campaigns ===
Under her leadership as the President of BJYM, her team launched 17 campaigns to attract young first-time voters from across the country. The campaigns ranged from online initiatives like a national Volunteer Network and #PehlaVoteModiKo pledge campaign to offline initiatives like Vijay Sankalp Bike Rally and Campus Ambassador Programme.

=== Modi rally in Mumbai ===
PM Narendra Modi addressed a mega rally two days before her election, organised in Bandra Kurla Complex in her constituency, Mumbai North Central.

== Tenure (2014-2019) ==
=== Members of Parliament Local Area Development Scheme ===
Mahajan is one of the few Parliamentarians in the country who has optimally utilized 100% of her MPLAD (Members of Parliament Local Area Development Scheme) fund. According to her website, the funds were used for building 1,428 public toilets, community halls, paver blocks in societies, indoor and open gymnasiums, individual household latrines in slums, temples, beautification of gardens, among other initiatives.

=== Private member's bills ===
She introduced a number of private member's bills for the benefit of women, children, sex-workers, senior citizens and animals during her tenure from 2014 to 2019. Some of the bills introduced by her are as follows:

- The Protection of Children from Sexual Offences (Amendment) Bill, 2017: to enhance punishment for penetrative sexual assault, aggravated penetrative sexual assault and sexual assault against children.
- The Constitution (Amendment) Bill, 2015: to provide nominated representation to Overseas Indian Community in the Lok Sabha.
- The Sex Workers (Rehabilitation and Social Security) Bill, 2015: to end discrimination of sex workers in any field and implement the Honourable Supreme Court's order based on the Criminal Appeal number 135 of 2010 relating to 'Budhadev Karmaskar vs State Government of West Bengal' case.
- The Prevention of Cruelty to Animals (Amendment) Bill, 2015: to amend penal provisions of the Prevention of Cruelty to Animals Act, 1960 with an increased penalty to prevent the unnecessary pain and suffering to animals and to ensure that the act is a deterrent to animal abusers.
- The Maintenance and Welfare of Parents and Senior Citizens (Amendment) Bill, 2016
- The Right of Children to Free and Compulsory Education (Amendment) Bill, 2017 (Amendment of section 21)
- The Rights of Persons with Disabilities (Amendment) Bill, 2017 (Amendment of the Schedule)

=== Committee assignments ===
- 1 September 2014 - 25 May 2019 - Member, Standing Committee on Urban Development
- 8 December 2014 - 25 May 2019 - Member, Committee on Private Members` Bills and Resolutions & Member, Consultative Committee, Ministry of Finance and Corporate Affairs
- 1 May 2016 - 30 April 2017 - Member, Committee on Estimates
- 9 May 2016 - 25 May 2019 - Member, Board of Governors - National Institute of Fashion Technology

== Positions held ==
=== Within BJP ===
- Former National President, BJYM
- National Secretary, BJP
- National Vice-President, BJYM
- General Secretary, BJYM, Maharashtra
- BJP State in-charge, Dadra Nagar Haveli

=== Legislative ===
- Member of Parliament (Since May 2014)
- Member, Parliamentary Standing Committee on External Affairs (13 September 2019 onwards)
- Member, Parliamentary Standing Committee on Urban Development (1 Sep. 2014 onwards)
- Member, Parliamentary Committee on Private Members` Bills and Resolutions (8 December 2014 onwards
- Member, Consultative Committee, Ministry of Finance and Corporate Affairs(8 December 2014 onwards)

=== Others ===
- Vice-Chairperson of the task force for International Financial Services Centre (IFSC), Mumbai
- Member of Board of Governors at National Institute of Fashion Technology (NIFT)
- Chairman of the Maharashtra State Animal Welfare Board
- President of the Maharashtra Basketball Association
- Chairperson of Indo-Israel FICCI Forum of Parliamentarians
- Co-Chair of Indo-Japan FICCI Forum of Parliamentarians
- Patron of Mumbai Youth Forum
- Patron of Swachhalay
- Parade Ambassador, Elephant Family India

== Personal life ==
Mahajan is married to Anand Rao, an industrialist from Hyderabad. They have two children; a son, Aadya Rao, and a daughter, Avika Rao. Mahajan is also a trained commercial pilot.
