= Sagar (1951 film) =

- Directed by: P. Jairaj
- Based on: Enoch Arden by Tennyson
- Produced by: P. Jairaj
- Starring: P. Jairaj; Nargis; Bharat Bhushan
- Release date: 1951
- Country: India
- Language: Hindi

Sagar (transl. Sea) is a 1951 Hindi-language film directed by P. Jairaj, who also produced and acted in the film, alongside Bharat Bhushan and Nargis. Sagar was Jairaj's only venture a producer, and its box office failure led him to distance himself from filmmaking.

According to author Jerry Pinto, the film was an adaptation of Tennyson's 1864 work Enoch Arden, and was an attempt by Jairaj to "capture the authentic atmosphere of the sea and the life of the fisherfolk".
