= P. Jairaj =

Indian actor, director and producer

Paidipati Jairaj
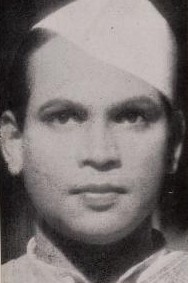
- Jairaj in the film Swami, c. 1941
- Born: 28 September 1909; Sircilla, Hyderabad State, British India (now in Telangana, India)
- Died: 11 August 2000 (aged 90); Mumbai, Maharashtra, India
- Education: Nizam College
- Years active: 1929–1995
- Spouse: Savitri (m. 1940)
- Awards: Dadasaheb Phalke Award (1980)

Paidipati Jairaj (28 September 1909 – 11 August 2000) was an Indian actor, director and producer known for his works majorly in Hindi; few Marathi, Gujarati, Telugu language films, and Telugu theatre. During the talkie period, from 1931 onwards, he started with Shikari in Urdu and English languages. Subsequently, he became one of the leading actors for about two decades, along with V. Shantaram, Ashok Kumar, Prithviraj Kapoor, Motilal etc. He starred in about 170 feature films in a variety of roles. He directed a few films such as Mohar, Mala (1941), Pratima, Rajghar (1951) and Sagar (1951), which he produced. In 1980, he was awarded with the Dadasaheb Phalke Award, the highest award for films in India, for his contributions to Indian cinema.

== Early life ==
Paidipati Jairaj was born in Sircilla of Hyderabad State (present-day Telangana) on 28 September 1909. He had two brothers - Paidipati Sundararaj Naidu, Paidipati Deendayal Naidu(Artist) and Paidipati Jairaj was the youngest.

== Career ==
Jairaj developed an interest in theatre and films during his graduate studies at Nizam College, and left for Bombay in 1929. He made his acting debut in 1929 with the silent film Star Kling Youth, and subsequently he acted in about eleven silent films including Triangle of Love, Mathru Bhoomi, All for Lover, Mahasagar Mothi, Flight into Death, My Hero etc.

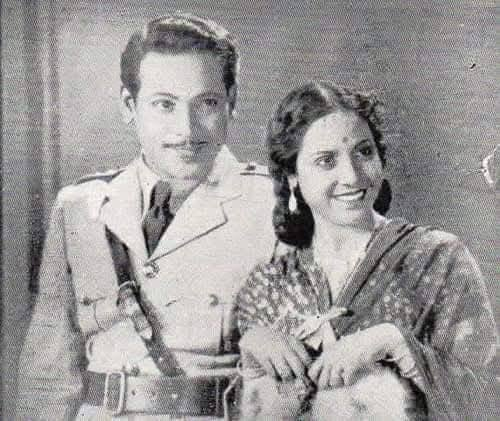
Jairaj with Geeta Nizami in the war thriller Panna (1944)

He played the characters of Amar Singh Rathore [1957], Prithviraj Chauhan [1959], and Maharana Pratap [1960] among notable films. He also essayed the roles of Shah Jahan [1947], Tipu Sultan [1959] and Haider Ali [1962]. His other portrayals have been in films such as Sassi Punnu [1947], Hatimtai [1956], Chandrashekar Azad [1963] and Durga Das [1964] among others. Jairaj did six films with Suraiya in the 1940s and 1950s, five of them, viz. Humaari Baat (1943), Singaar (1949), Amar Kahani (1949), Rajput (1951) and Resham (1952) as her hero, and one of them, Lal Kunwar (1952), as second lead. In 1952, he produced and directed his own film Sagar, which was not well received by the audiences, but he was still committed to cinema.

== Personal life ==
He married a Punjabi woman, Savitri, from Delhi. It was an arranged marriage. Prithviraj Kapoor's father had chosen the bride for him. He had two sons and three daughters. His wife died a year before him of cancer. His daughter Geeta Gupta looked after him in his last years. Rajan Shahi, TV producer-director, is his daughter's son (maternal grandson), the sole person of Jairaj's extended family in Bollywood. Jairaj died in Mumbai on 11 August 2000.

== Popular culture ==
A one-hour documentary, Life journey of Jairaj, was made by the Government of Telangana in 2018 to celebrate his life.

== Awards ==
National Film Awards

- Dadasaheb Phalke Award - 1980

== Filmography ==
=== Actor ===
Year	Film	Character	Notes
1930	Jagmagti Jawani		
1932	Shikari		
1933	Maya Jaal		
1933	Patit Pawan		
1933	Aurat Ka Dil		
1934	Mazdoor		
1935	Sher Dil Aurat		
1935	Jeevan Natak		
1937	Toofani Khazana		
1938	Bhabi	Kishore	
1938	Madhur Milan		
1939	Jugari		
1939	Leatherface	Samar	
1940	Chambe Di Kali		
1941	Prabhat		
1941	Mala		Also co-director
1941	Swami		
1942	Nai Duniya		
1942	Khilona	Amar	
1942	Tamanna	Ramesh	
1943	Nai Kahani		
1943	Hamari Baat		
1943	Prem Sangeet		
1944	Panna	Shyam	
1945	Rahat		
1946	Shahjehan	Shirazi	
1946	Salgirah		
1946	Rajputani		
1947	Manmani	Manohar	
1948	Sajan Ka Ghar		
1948	Anjuman		
1948	Azadi Ki Raah Par		
1949	Darogaji		
1949	Roomal		
1949	Singaar	Dr. Kishan	
1949	Amar Kahani		Re-released later on as Kanchan (1955)
1951	Rajput		
1951	Sagar		
1952	Lal Kunwar		
1952	Resham		
1954	Baadbaan		
1955	Teerandaz		
1955	Insaniyat	Martand	
1956	Parivar		
1956	Hatim Tai	Hatim Tai	
1957	Mumtaz Mahal		
1957	Pardesi	Hassan Baig Khurrasani	Also known as Journey Beyond Three Seas
1959	Char Dil Char Rahen	Nirmal Kumar	
1960	Superman		
1960	Return of Mr. Superman	Superman	Mr. Superman ki Wapsi
1960	Lal Quila		
1960	Veer Durgadas		
1960	Chambe Di Kali		Punjabi movie
1961	Razia Sultana		
1961	Jai Chitod		
1962	Pick Pocket		
1963	Nine Hours to Rama		
1963	Gul-e-Bakawali		
1964	Khufia Mahal		
1965	Baghi Haseena		
1965	Mujrim Kaun Khooni Kaun		
1966	Maya		
1967	Baharon Ke Sapne		
1968	Neel Kamal		
1970	Gunah Aur Kanoon		
1970	Jeevan Mrityu		
1971	Nadaan		
1971	Chhoti Bahu		
1971	Chingari		
1972	Shehzada		
1973	Gehri Chaal		
1973	Suraj Aur Chanda		
1973	Chhalia		
1973	Naag Mere Saathi		
1974	Chor Chor		
1974	Faslah		
1975	Sholay	Police Commissioner	
1975	Kala Sona		
1975	Dharmatma		
1975	Jogidas Khuman		
1975	Himalay Se Ooncha		
1975	Toofan		
1976	Hera Pheri		
1976	Charas		
1976	Bairaag		
1976	Naag Champa		
1977	Chhailla Babu		
1977	Kachcha Chor		
1978	Muqaddar Ka Sikandar		
1978	Don		
1978	Aakhri Daku		
1978	Khoon Ka Badla Khoon		
1979	Ahimsa		
1979	Khandaan		
1979	Nagin Aur Suhagan		
1980	Jyoti Bane Jwala		
1980	Chunaoti		
1980	Jazbaat		
1980	Shiv Shakti		
1981	Fiffty Fiffty		
1981	Khoon Aur Paani		
1981	Kranti		
1983	Ardh Satya		
1983	Masoom		
1983	Karate		
1983	Pukar		
1983	Paanchwin Manzil		
1984	Bindiya Chamkegi		
1984	Maan Maryada	Thakur Surajbhan Singh	
1984	Unchi Uraan		
1986	Zinda Laash		
1988	Khoon Bhari Maang		
1992	Lambu Dada		
1993	Meri Aan		
1994	Betaaj Badshah		
1995	God and Gun		

=== Director ===
Year	Film	Notes
1941	Mala	Co-directed with Mahendra Thakore and also acted.
1945	Pratima	
1951	Rajghar	
1951	Sagar	Also producer and actor
1959	Mohar	
