= Jeevan Swapna =

Bollywood film released in 1946

- Starring: Naseem Banu; Trilok Kapoor
- Release date: 1946
- Country: India
- Language: Hindi

Jeevan Swapna is a Bollywood film that was released in 1946, starring Naseem Banu and Trilok Kapoor.

== Cast ==
- Naseem Banu
- Trilok Kapoor
