= Naachwali =

- Directed by: Ramnik Desai
- Starring: Jaddanbai; Mehboob Khan; Baby Rani
- Release date: 1934
- Country: India
- Language: Hindi

Naachwali is a 1934 Indian Hindi-language film directed by Ramnik Desai. The film stars Jaddanbai, Mehboob Khan, and Baby Rani (Nargis, as a child artiste). It marked Nargis' screen debut.
