= Darogaji =

- Directed by: Akhtar Hussain
- Starring: Nargis; P. Jairaj
- Release date: 1949
- Country: India
- Language: Hindi

Darogaji is a 1949 Indian Hindi-language film directed by Akhtar Hussain. It was produced under the banner of Nargis Art Concern, and starred Nargis, P. Jairaj, Neelam, and Nissar.

The film was released in Bombay in 1949. In November, The Times of India's combined review of Darogaji along with two other new releases—Hamari Manzil and Ladli—lamented that these film were "Unlikely To Set The Thames On Fire!"
