= Barsaat (1949 film) =

- Film poster
- Directed by: Raj Kapoor
- Written by: Ramanand Sagar
- Screenplay by: Ramanand Sagar
- Story by: Ramanand Sagar
- Produced by: Raj Kapoor
- Starring: Nargis; Raj Kapoor; Prem Nath; Nimmi; K. N. Singh; Cuckoo; B. M. Vyas
- Cinematography: Jal Mistry
- Edited by: G. G. Mayekar
- Music by: Shankar Jaikishan
- Production company: R. K. Films
- Distributed by: R. K. Films; All India Films
- Release date: 22 April 1949; (India)
- Running time: 171 min.
- Country: India
- Language: Hindi
- Box office: ₹1.9 crore

Barsaat (1949)

Barsaat (English: Rain) is a 1949 Indian Hindi-language film directed by Raj Kapoor. The film stars the famous duo of Kapoor and Nargis as well as Prem Nath. It was also the introduction of actress Nimmi in her first film role. Barsaat was one of the first major hit films directed by Kapoor. This success allowed Kapoor to buy RK Studios in 1950. This was Raj Kapoor's second directional venture after Aag. Barsaat became the highest-grossing Indian film at the time of its release beating Gyan Mukherjee's Kismet which released 6 years earlier.

== Plot ==
The film revolves around two love stories. Pran (Raj Kapoor) and Reshma (Nargis) and Gopal (Prem Nath) and Neela (Nimmi). Two friends with contrasting personalities, the rich but sensitive Pran and the womanizing Gopal both have affairs with two mountain girls while holidaying in the valley of Kashmir. While Pran and Reshma's love is true and reciprocated, Gopal is a womanizing villain, who disregards the faithful Neela and condemns her to wait faithfully for his return with the barsaat (rainy season). Many plot intrigues follow through with Pran and Reshma facing many trials on the path of love, including parental opposition, accidents, and an attempted forced marriage of Reshma to an uncouth fisherman. But the couple are finally reunited. Gopal, on the other hand, finally becomes a reformed character and rushes to claim Neela, who has been pining away. Arriving there, he finds his love dead. The film ends with Gopal lighting Neela's funeral pyre as it finally rains.

== Production ==
=== Filming ===
Raj Kapoor shot parts of the film in the Kashmir Valley, making it the first film ever shot in the valley.

== Artwork and Publicity ==
The poster and publicity for the movie were illustrated by the artist Dr S. M. Pandit. One of the posters showing the heroine dangling on the arm of the hero would go on to inspire the R K Studios' famous logo.

== Music ==
The music of Barsaat became famous upon the film's release in 1949. The film was the debut for music directors Shankar Jaikishan and established their careers. The famous playback singer Lata Mangeshkar famously sang for both Nargis and Nimmi in Barsaat.

Actress Bimla Kumari appears swaying in the song 'Hawa mein udta jaaye', the song became very popular as well.

The soundtrack was listed by Planet Bollywood at number 1 on their list of the 100 Greatest Bollywood Soundtracks. Rakesh Budhu of Planet Bollywood gave 10 stars stating, "Barsaat is ideally one of Hindi cinema's best soundtracks".

Barsaat

Studio album by Shankar Jaikishan
- Released: 1949
- Genre: Feature film soundtrack
- Length: 38:01
- Label: His Master's Voice
- Producer: Shankar Jaikishan

Shankar Jaikishan chronology
Barsaat (1949)	Awaara (1951)

Professional ratings
Review scores
Source	Rating
Planet Bollywood	10/10 stars

=== Track list ===
All music is composed by Shankar Jaikishan.

No.	Title	Lyrics	Singer(s)	Length
1.	"Hawa Mein Udta Jaye"	Ramesh Shastri	Lata Mangeshkar	2:30
2.	"Jiya Beqarar Hai"	Hasrat Jaipuri	Lata Mangeshkar	3:10
3.	"Barsaat Mein Humse Mile" (Raga Bhairavi)	Shailendra	Lata Mangeshkar	5:00
4.	"Mujhe Kisi Se Pyaar Ho Gayaa"	Jalal Malihabadi	Lata Mangeshkar	2:46
5.	"Meri Aankhon Mein Bas Gaya Koi Re" (Raga Pahadi)	Hasrat Jaipuri	Lata Mangeshkar	2:47
6.	"Patli Kamar Hai"	Shailendra, Dhakaria Akhilesh (lyricist)	Lata Mangeshkar, Mukesh	5:17
7.	"Main Zindagi Mein Hardam Rota Hi Raha"	Hasrat Jaipuri	Mohammed Rafi	2:51
8.	"Ab Mera Kaun Sahara"	Hasrat Jaipuri	Lata Mangeshkar	3:15
9.	"Chhod Gaye Balam" (Raga Sindhu Bhairavi)	Hasrat Jaipuri	Lata Mangeshkar, Mukesh	4:28
10.	"Bichhde Hue Pardesi"	Hasrat Jaipuri	Lata Mangeshkar	3:28
11.	"Jiya Beqarar Hai"		Instrumental	2:29
Total length:				38:01
