= Nargis (film) =

- Directed by: D.D. Kashyap
- Starring: David Abraham; Nargis; Rehman
- Distributed by: Famous Pictures
- Release date: 1946
- Country: India
- Language: Hindi

Nargis (Hindi: नर्गिस) is a 1946 Hindi language romantic drama film directed by D.D. Kashyap, starring David Abraham, Nargis, and Rehman.

== Cast ==
- David Abraham
- Nargis
- Rehman
- Alka Achrekar
- Pratima Devi

== Music ==
1. Aa Ankho Me Aa Palko Me - Amirbai Karnataki
2. Mai Kaise Kahu Tumse Jana - Amirbai Karnataki
3. Roti Ankho Me Teri Yaad Liye Jati Hu - Amirbai Karnataki
4. Ye To Bata Mere Khuda - N/A
5. Kya Bataye Ki Mohabbat Ki Kahani Kya Hai - Zohrabai Ambalewali
6. Mere Jivan Ke Sahare So Ja - N/A
7. Mile Sahara Koi Re - Amirbai Karnataki
