= Taqdeer (1943 film) =

- Directed by: Mehboob Khan
- Written by: Ghulam Mohammed
- Produced by: Mehboob Productions
- Starring: Nargis; Motilal; Chandra Mohan; Charlie; Jillobai; Jaddanbai; Kayam Ali
- Cinematography: Faredoon A. Irani
- Edited by: Shamsudin Qadri
- Music by: Rafiq Ghaznavi
- Release date: 1943
- Country: India
- Language: Hindi

Taqdeer

Taqdeer (Destiny, Fate) is a 1943 Indian Hindi language comedy film. It was directed by Mehboob Khan under his Mehboob Productions banner. The star cast included a young Nargis in her first lead role along with Motilal, Chandra Mohan, Charlie, Jilloobai and Kayam Ali.

Written by Ghulam Mohammed, the screenplay and dialogue were by Agha Jani Kashmiri. The music was composed by Rafiq Ghaznavi and the lyrics credited to Meharul Qadri. The story is a romantic comedy based on the lost and found formula set against an entertaining backdrop. It was the ninth-highest-grossing Indian film of 1943.

== Cast ==
- Motilal as Babu
- Chandramohan as Judge Jumnaprasad
- Charlie as Seth Badriprasad
- Nargis as Shyama
- Jilloobai as Sudha, Judge's wife
- Kayamali
- Ansari as Stage actor
- Laddan
- Maheshar Shirazi

== Story ==
Badriprasad (Charlie), a widower, is in the theatre business and is staging a play at a fair (the Kumbh Mela). His manager Ghanshyam, tells him that Pappu, Badriprasad's young son, is lost. They look for him but cannot find him. The manager instead finds a little girl, Shyama, who seems lost. He and his wife, being childless, decide to bring her up as their daughter. Judge Jumna Prasad (Chandra Mohan), who is also at the fair, is unable to find his daughter Shyama and tries searching for her with the help of the police. The judge's wife loses her mental balance when she hears about her missing daughter. The doctor says that she is in danger of losing her life too if Shyama is not found soon. The judge's servant finds Pappu and tells the judge to dress the boy in Shyama's clothes and pretend the boy is Shyama to save his wife's life. Thereafter, the judge's wife continues to believe that Pappu is Shyama in spite of seeing him dressed as a boy even after he grows up. She insists on calling him "beti" (daughter).

Badriprasad loses all interest in his theatre after the loss of his son. His manager Ghanshyam encourages him to revive the theatre. Badriprasad sees the little Shyama dancing and asks the manager about her. By now Ghanshyam's wife has died and he lets Badriprasad adopt the little girl. Shyama (Nargis) grows up in the theatre milieu as Badriprasad's daughter and is also the main cast in their theatre productions.

Pappu, now called Babu (Motilal) visits the theatre with his parents. He is enamoured of Shyama and soon both fall in love. The judge refuses to allow the marriage as he considers theatre people below his social standing. Babu finds out that he is not the judge's real son and leaves home. The judge's wife regains her memory following the shock of Babu leaving the house. Disagreements are sorted out once the lost identities of Shyama and Babu are discovered.

== Trivia ==
This was Nargis Dutt's debut film as a heroine. She was about 14 years old to Motilal's 33 years when she agreed to act in this film. She had earlier acted as a child artist in her mother's (Jaddan Bai) films by the name of Baby Rani. Nargis's real name was Fatima, but Mehboob Khan didn't think it suited her, and so for the film changed it to Nargis. She got good reviews for the film with Filmindia calling it "a brilliant screen debut".

== Box office ==
Taqdeer was appreciated by the critics as well as the people. It was a success and was the ninth highest grossing film of 1943.

== Music ==
The music was composed by Rafiq Ghaznavi and though the film credits one lyricist Mahir ul Qadri, there were two other lyricists, namely Anjum Pilibhiti and Agha Mahshar Shirazi both of whom penned one song each. Agha Mahshar Shirazi was credited for his acting in this film, excluding his first name. The songs for Nargis were sung by Shamshad Begum, while Motilal sang his own songs. There are a couple of songs with patriotic fervour denoting the pre-independent era the film was made in. The first was "Badle Jo Zamaane Ki Taqdeer Hamari Hai" and the second was "Meri Mata Meri Mata, Bharat Mata".

Sl No.	Song	Singer	Lyricist
1.	"Badle Jo Zamaane Ki Taqdeer Hamari Hai"	Shamshad Begum, Charlie and chorus	Agha Mahshar Shirazi
2.	"Babu Darogaji Kaun Qasoor Par"	Shamshad Begum	Anjum Pilibhiti
3.	"Mere Mann Ki Duniya Basa Di"	Shamshad Begum	Mahir ul Qadri
4.	"Mera Maika Ho Ya Sasural"	Shamshad Begum	Mahir ul Qadri
5.	"Tumse Duniya Mujhe Chhudati Hai"	Shamshad Begum	Mahir ul Qadri
6.	"Meri Mata Meri Mata, Bharat Mata"	Shamshad Begum, Motilal	Mahir ul Qadri
7.	"Chham Chham Chham Ghanghor Ghataayen Chhaayin"	Shamshad Begum, Motilal	Mahir ul Qadri
8.	"Aap Kyun Kyun, Aap Kyun Aayenge"	Shamshad Begum, Motilal	Mahir ul Qadri
9.	"O Jaanewaale Aaja"	Shamshad Begum, Motilal	Mahir ul Qadri
10.	"Zaalim Jawaani Kafir Adaayein"	Motilal	Mahir ul Qadri
