= Ramayani =

- Directed by: Sarvottam Badami
- Produced by: Purnima Productions
- Starring: Pahari Sanyal; Nargis; Chandra Mohan; Rose
- Music by: S. N. Tripathi
- Production company: Purnima Productions
- Release date: 1945
- Country: India
- Language: Hindi

Ramayani is a 1945 Hindi mythological film directed by Sarvottam Badami for Purnima Productions. The music direction was by S. N. Tripathi with lyrics written by Bekal. Several films were made in that era based on the Ramayana. Vijay Bhatt made his famous Ram Rajya (1943), and Purnima Productions made their version of the epic, titling it Ramayani. The film starred Pahari Sanyal, Nargis, Chandra Mohan, Rose, Kanhaiyalal and Amirbai Karnataki.

== Cast ==
- Pahari Sanyal
- Nargis
- Chandra Mohan
- Rose Musleah
- Moni Chatterjee
- Kanhaiyalal
- Prabha
- Amirbai Karnataki

== Music ==
The music was composed by S. N. Tripathi with the lyrics written by Bekal.

=== Song list ===
#	Title
1	"Aise Na Hame Chhedo Aise Na Satao"
2	"Hame Kiska Dar Hame Kiski Fikar"
3	"Woh Toh Mere Huye Magar Duniya Meri Hui Nahin"
4	"Ye Jeevan Swarg Banayenge"
5	"Ae Ri Duniya Ab To Maan Ri"
6	"Diwani Shyam Main To Teri Diwani"
7	"Unhen Prem Se Prem Sikha Doongi"
8	"Mere Mann Mandir Ki Devi"
9	"More Ram Madad Kar Mori"
