= Priya Dutt =

Indian politician and social worker (born 1966)

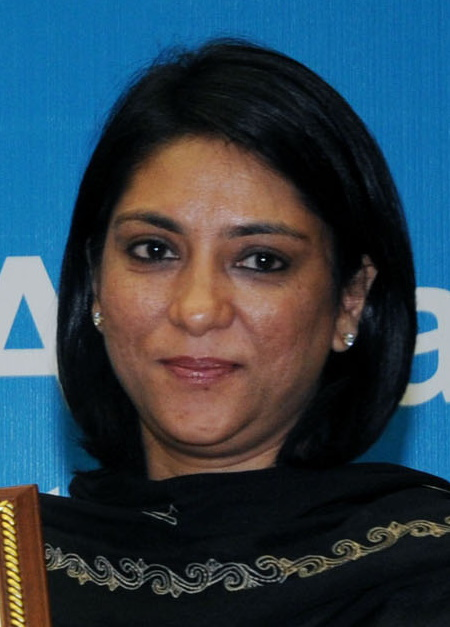
- Dutt at an event in 2018

Member of Parliament, Lok Sabha
- In office 16 May 2009 – 16 May 2014
- Preceded by: Eknath Gaikwad
- Succeeded by: Poonam Mahajan Rao
- Constituency: Mumbai North Central, Maharashtra
- In office 22 November 2005 — 16 May 2009
- Preceded by: Sunil Dutt
- Succeeded by: Gurudas Kamat
- Constituency: Mumbai North West, Maharashtra

Personal details
- Born: Priya Balraj Dutt; 28 August 1966 (age 60) Bombay, Maharashtra, India
- Citizenship: Indian
- Party: Indian National Congress
- Spouse: Owen Roncon (m. 2003)
- Children: 2
- Parents: Sunil Dutt (father); Nargis Dutt (mother); Sanjay Dutt (brother)
- Relatives: Dutt family
- Education: Sophia College
- Occupation: Social worker; Politician

Priya Dutt Roncon (born 28 August 1966) is an Indian politician and social worker. She was elected for the first time to the 14th Lok Sabha from Mumbai North West constituency in Maharashtra on 22 November 2005, representing the Indian National Congress party. She represented the Mumbai North Central constituency in the 15th Lok Sabha from 2009. In the 2014 and 2019 Indian general elections, she was defeated by Poonam Mahajan of the BJP.

== Early life and education ==
Priya Dutt Roncon, born as Priya Balraj Dutt is the daughter of the actor and politician Sunil Dutt and actress Nargis Dutt. She is of Punjabi descent and was born and raised in Bombay, Maharashtra. Her parents were elected to represent the Indian National Congress and her father was a government minister. She is the sister of actor Sanjay Dutt and Namrata Dutt. Music composer Jaddanbai was her maternal grandmother, and actor Anwar Hussain was her uncle. With her sister, she published a memoir, Mr and Mrs Dutt: Memories of our Parents, in 2007.

She received her Bachelor of Arts degree in Sociology from Sophia College, University of Bombay. She has a Post Graduate Diploma in television production from the Center for Media Arts in New York City, United States.

== Politics ==
It first became obvious that Priya was her father’s successor when she accompanied him on his Mahashanti Padyatra in 1987 from Mumbai to Amritsar. In 2005, following the death of her father, Sunil Dutt, and despite a low voter turnout, she won her seat in the Lok Sabha by a margin of 172,043 votes over the Shiv Sena candidate. Dutt received considerable media attention for this victory, partially on account of her famous family.

She won Lok Sabha elelctions in 2009 again and became MP from Mumbai North Central Constituency. Priya has been appointed secretary of the All-India Congress Committee. In the 2014 and 2019 Indian general elections, she was defeated by Poonam Mahajan of the BJP.

== Other activities ==
After university, Dutt worked in television and video and studied at The Center for the Media Arts in New York. During and after the Bombay riots, Dutt worked with Muslim refugees in Mumbai. She reported receiving threatening telephone calls and public harassment.

Dutt is the Chairperson for the Nargis Dutt Foundation (NDF), which started in New York by her father Sunil Dutt, in memory of her mother Nargis Dutt who died from cancer in 1981. Dutt took over the Chairmanship from her father Shri Sunil Dutt after his demise in 2005 and founded the India outfit of NDF.

== Personal life ==
Priya married Owen Roncon on 27 November 2003. Roncon is a partner in Oranjuice Entertainment, a music promotion company, and Fountainhead Promotions & Events Pvt Ltd, a marketing firm. Roncon is a Roman Catholic from Bandra, West Mumbai. They have two sons Sumair (born 2007) and Siddharth (born 2005).

== Bibliography ==
- Mr and Mrs Dutt: Memories of our Parents, Namrata Dutt Kumar and Priya Dutt, 2007, Roli Books. ISBN 978-81-7436-455-5.
