= Anban (film) =

- Directed by: Niren Lahiri
- Produced by: Bharat Productions
- Starring: Pahari Sanyal; Nargis
- Music by: Gyan Dutt
- Release date: 1944
- Country: India
- Language: Hindi

Anban is a 1944 Bollywood social film directed by Niren Lahiri. The film was produced by Bharat Productions, with the music by Gyan Dutt.

== Cast ==
- Pahari Sanyal
- Nargis
- Shobhana Samarth
- Jagirdar
- Shahnawaz

== Soundtrack ==
The soundtrack was composed by Gyan Dutt and the lyrics are penned by Gajendra.

S.No	Song title	Singers
1	"Bole Man Ki Maina Piya Ka Pyara Naam"	Ameerbai Karnataki
2	"Kyon Dard De Ke Bhool Gaye Shyam Salone"	Hamida Banu
