= Talashe Haq =

- Directed by: Chimanlal Luhar
- Starring: Yakub; Jaddan Bai; Nargis; Ashiq Husain; Gulzar Bai; A. R. Akhtar
- Music by: Jaddan Bai
- Distributed by: Sangeet Film Co.
- Release date: 1935
- Country: India
- Language: Hindi

Talashe Haq (transl. Search for truth) is a 1935 Indian Hindi-language drama film directed by Chimanlal Luhar. The film stars Jaddanbai, Yakub, and Nargis (as a child artist) in the lead roles.

== Cast ==
Cast included:

- Yakub
- Jaddan Bai
- Nargis
