= Humayun (film) =

1945 film

- Directed by: Mehboob Khan
- Written by: Agha Jani Kashmiri
- Screenplay by: Agha Jani Kashmiri
- Story by: Prof. Waqif Moradabadi
- Starring: Ashok Kumar; Veena; Nargis; Chandra Mohan; Shah Nawaz
- Cinematography: Faredoon Irani
- Edited by: Shamsudin Kadri
- Music by: Ghulam Haider
- Production company: Mehboob Khan Productions
- Distributed by: Mehboob Khan Productions
- Release date: 1945
- Country: India
- Language: Hindi

Humayun

Humayun (Hindi: हुमायूँ) is a 1945 Indian Hindi-language historical epic film directed by Mehboob Khan. It was the seventh highest grossing Indian film of 1945.

The main cast included Ashok Kumar, Veena, Nargis as Hamida Bano, and Shah Nawaz.

== Cast ==
- Ashok Kumar as Badshah Naseerudin Humayun
- Veena as Rajkumari
- Nargis as Hamida Bano
- Chandra Mohan as Rajkumar Randhir
- Shah Nawaz as Badshah Babar
- K.N.Singh as Jai Singh
- Himalayawala
- Majid
- Yusuf Effendi
- Abdul Rashid
- Abdul Kader
- Khurshed Ahmed
- Afghan Sandow
- Wasker
- Mahesher Shirazi
- T. M. Mathur
