= Nargis =

Indian actress (1929–1981)

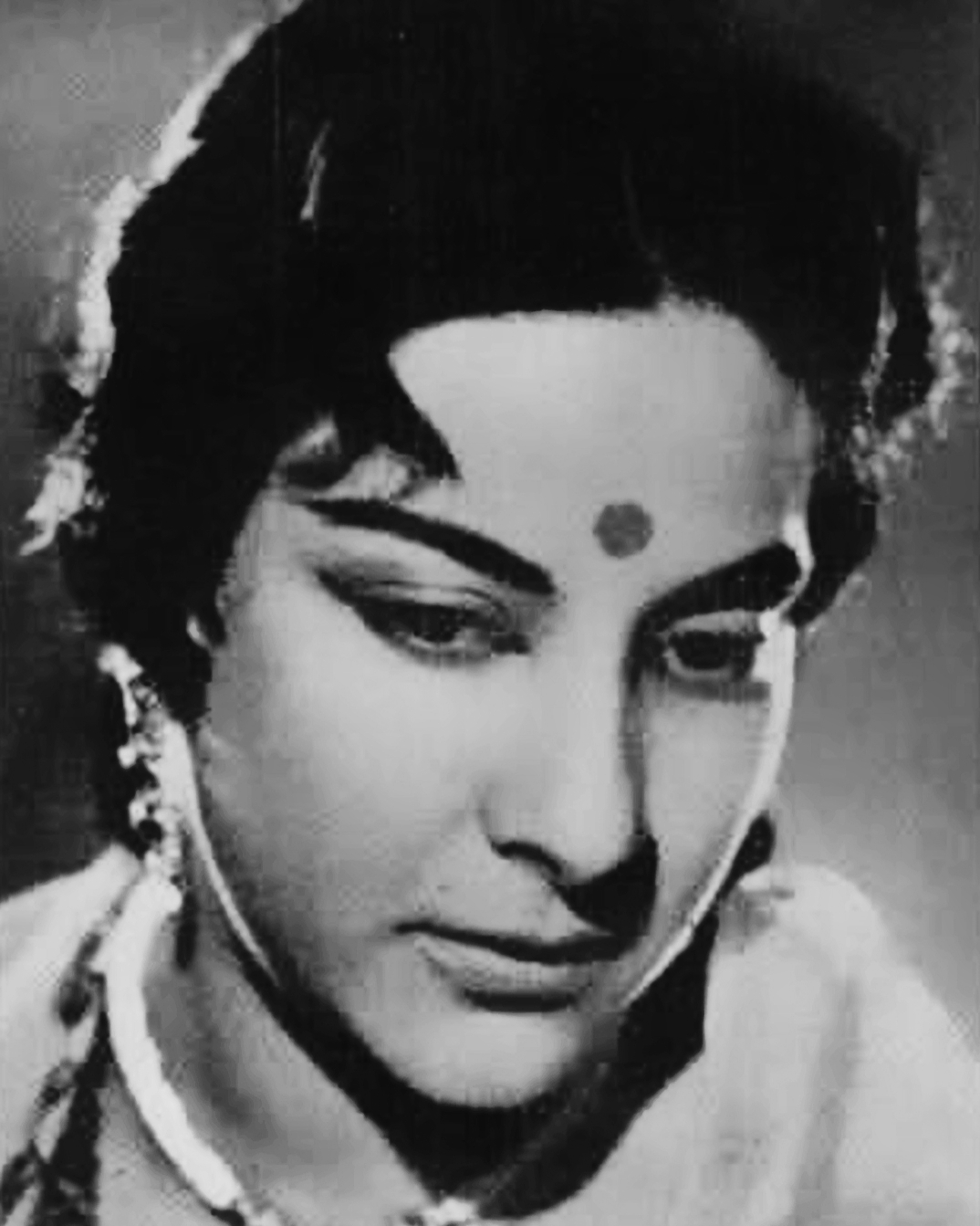
- Nargis in 1967
- Born: Fatima Rashid; 1 June 1929; Calcutta, Bengal Presidency, British India (present-day Kolkata, West Bengal, India)
- Died: 3 May 1981 (aged 51); Bombay, Maharashtra, India (present-day Mumbai)
- Resting place: Bada Qabrastan Mumbai
- Other names: Nargis Dutt; Nirmala Dutt; Baby; Baby Nargis
- Occupations: Actress; politician
- Years active: 1934–1936; 1942–1968
- Works: Full list
- Spouse: Sunil Dutt (m. 1958)
- Partner: Raj Kapoor (1947–1956)
- Children: 3, including Sanjay Dutt and Priya Dutt
- Mother: Jaddanbai
- Family: Dutt family (by marriage)
- Awards: Filmfare Award for Best Actress (1958); National Film Award (1968)
- Honours: Padma Shri (1958)

Member of Parliament, Rajya Sabha
- In office 3 April 1980 – 3 May 1981
- Nominated by: Neelam Sanjiva Reddy
- Preceded by: Vidya Prakash Dutt
- Succeeded by: Asima Chatterjee
- Constituency: Nominated (Arts)

Nargis Dutt (born Fatima Rashid, also known as Nirmala Dutt; 1 June 1929 – 3 May 1981), known mononymously as Nargis, was an Indian actress and politician who worked in Hindi cinema. Regarded as one of the greatest actresses in the history of Hindi cinema, Nargis often portrayed sophisticated and independent women in a range of genres, from screwball comedy to literary drama. She was among the highest paid actresses of the 1950s and 1960s.

In a career spanning three decades, Nargis made her screen debut in a minor role at the age of five with Naachwali (1934), but her acting career actually began with the film Tamanna (1942). Nargis had her first leading role with Taqdeer (1943). Nargis had her breakthrough with the romance film Andaz (1949) and the musical Barsaat (1949). Following this she starred in Raj Kapoor's crime drama Awaara (1951), which was a major critical and financial success. After a brief setback in the early 1950s, she reemerged with the comedy-drama Shree 420 (1955) and the romantic comedy Chori Chori (1956). Nargis starred in Mehboob Khan's Oscar-nominated epic drama Mother India (1957), the highest-grossing film in India at that point of time, for which she won Filmfare Award for Best Actress. Her last film was the drama Raat Aur Din (1967), for which she received the inaugural National Film Award for Best Actress.

Nargis married her Mother India co-star Sunil Dutt in 1958. Together they had three children, including the actor Sanjay Dutt. Along with her husband, Nargis formed the Ajanta Arts Culture Troupe which hired several leading actors and singers of the time and held stage shows at border areas. In the early 1970s, Nargis became the first patron of The Spastic Society of India and her subsequent work with the organisation brought her recognition as a social worker and later a Rajya Sabha nomination in 1980.

Nargis died in 1981 of pancreatic cancer, only three days before her son Sanjay Dutt made his debut in Hindi films with the film Rocky. In 1982, the Nargis Dutt Memorial Cancer Foundation was established in her memory by her husband Sunil Dutt. The award for Best Feature Film on National Integration in the Annual Film Awards ceremony is called the Nargis Dutt Award in her honour. In 2011, Rediff.com listed her as the greatest Indian actress of all time.

== Early life ==
Nargis was born on 1 June 1929 as Fatima Rashid in Calcutta, in the Bengal Presidency of British India (now Kolkata, West Bengal, India).

Her father Abdul Rashid, formerly Mohanchand Uttamchand Tyagi ("Mohan Babu"), was originally a wealthy heir from Rawalpindi, Punjab who had converted from Hinduism to Islam. Her mother Jaddanbai was from Benares and was a Hindustani classical music singer, becoming one of the early pioneers of Indian cinema. Nargis' mother had moved from Allahabad to Calcutta and later introduced Nargis into the movie culture unfolding in India at the time.

Nargis' maternal half-brother, Anwar Hussain, was also a film actor.

== Career ==
=== 1934–1948: Film debut and breakthrough ===
Nargis' earliest screen performance was in Naachwali (1934), which starred her mother Jaddanbai. She was credited as Baby Rani in the film. Nargis subsequently made an appearance in the 1935 film Talashe Haq when she was six years old, credited as Baby Nargis. Nargis (نرگس [ˈnərɡɪs]) is a Persian word meaning Narcissus, the daffodil flower. She was subsequently credited as Nargis in all of her films.

Nargis appeared in numerous films after her debut. In 1943 at the age of 14, she appeared in Mehboob Khan's Taqdeer, opposite Motilal. The film was a box office success, and she was extensively praised for her performance. Filmindia referred to it as "an excellent debut". Following Taqdeer, Nargis starred in the 1944 film Anban and also in Rajkumar opposite Chetan Anand, who was yet to make his directorial debut. Nargis next starred in the 1945 period drama Humayun, opposite the leading actor of those times, Ashok Kumar and the mythological film Ramayani. In 1946 she starred in Nargis. These films were moderately successful.

In 1948, she made her first collaboration with Raj Kapoor, the drama Aag, in which she portrays a homeless woman who becomes an actress. The film was not a major success and did average business at the box office. However this marked the first of more than a dozen films in which Raj Kapoor and Nargis appeared together. She also starred in highly successful tragedy Mela, the editor of Filmindia, Baburao Patel praised her performance, but in her role of mother found her "unconvincing" and "synthetic", The reported box office gross for the film according to IBOS was ₹50 lakhs in 1948. The adjusted gross as of 2015 is roughly estimated at ₹340.44 crores. Her last film of the year was Anokha Pyar, which was not a success.

=== 1949–1954: Rise to prominence, success and setback ===
In 1949, Nargis starred in Mehboob Khan's critically acclaimed drama Andaz. The film saw her playing Neena, whose husband Rajan (Raj Kapoor) suspects of her having an affair with her friend Dilip (Dilip Kumar). It had a slow start at the box office, but as soon as positive word-of-mouth spread, it emerged as a major commercial success and the highest-grossing film of all time. The film was first hit in Kapoor's career, and a breakthrough for Nargis and Kumar. Following this she starred in Barsaat, directed by Kapoor starred Nargis as a village belle and Kapoor as a poet. The film was the debut of Nimmi, who would later become a well-known actress. Its release was already hyped due to the huge success of Andaz, and therefore it became another major box office success. Barsaat was the highest-grossing film of 1949, as well as of all time, breaking the record of Andaz.

She followed this with roles in the 1950 films Meena Bazaar, the romantic drama Jogan, Jan Pahechan, the musical drama Babul, and Aadhi Raat. Both Jogan and Babul were box office hits and her performance in Babul was specially noticed. Following this she starred in the drama films Hulchul and Deedar (both 1951). Due to the success of Andaz and Barsaat, Raj Kapoor was impressed by Nargis' onscreen charm and presence. He therefore chose her to play a character in Awaara (1951) (often written as Awāra). Although it revolved around a father and his estranged son, Nargis played the pivotal role of a lawyer who knows the truth that Raj (played by Kapoor) and Raghunath (played by Prithviraj Kapoor) are son-father. Unlike the roles played by other actresses of those times, Nargis portrayed an outspoken woman-lawyer who criticises the people who regard woman as a "thing made for household chores". She was also seen donning a swimwear in a scene from Awaara, a bold outfit for an Indian woman to wear in that era. The film was released on 14 December 1951, receiving universal acclaim for the performances of Prithviraj, Raj and Nargis. Not only in India, the film was a blockbuster overseas too, making Nargis and Raj well-known stars in countries such as Greece and the United States. Grossing ₹12.5 million in India, it became the highest-grossing film of all time, breaking the record of Barsaat.

In 1952, Nargis starred in the romance film Bewafa, which was not a major success. Following this, she also starred in the psychological drama Anhonee Nargis was highly appreciated for enacting a dual role and her performance garnered critical acclaim. Furthermore, rediff commented "The ethereal actress is equally adept at bringing out the conflicting qualities of both -- the gregarious courtesan Mohini as well as her dignified half-sister and heiress, Roop". She then starred in the adventure film Amber. Out of her releases of 1952, only Anhonee was a success. Following this was the 1953 film Dhoon, which was not a major success. Her last film of the year was the romantic drama Aah, which too was not major success, despite this it is often regarded as a cult classic. Her only film of 1954 was Angarey.

=== 1955–1958: Resurgence and stardom ===
Nargis revived her career with Raj Kapoor's social drama Shree 420 (1955). In the film, Nargis portrays a school teacher who becomes Raj's (played by Kapoor) love interest. It was Nargis' last under Raj Kapoor's direction. Commenting on the performance, rediff said that "The performances help the film's endorsement of ethical living and high thinking. Nargis' quiet demeanour in the film contrasted with Raj Kapoor's flamboyance". The film was a major blockbuster, emerging as the highest-grossing film in India at the time.

She once again collaborated with Kapoor for the box office success Chori Chori (1956), which revolves around a girl (Nargis) who runs away from her house in order to marry a gold digger pilot (Pran), but ends up falling for a news reporter (Kapoor) whom she meets in a bus. Described by ThePrint which praised the lead's chemistry. The film was also a major box office success emerging as one of the highest-grossing films of the year. In the same year, she did a special appearance in Kapoor's Jagte Raho. The film was her last to co-star Raj Kapoor.

In 1957, she appeared in Mehboob Khan's Oscar-nominated epic drama Mother India, which won her the Filmfare Award for Best Actress. Baburao Patel of the film magazine, Filmindia, in December 1957, described Mother India as "the greatest picture produced in India" and wrote that no other actress would have been able to perform the role as well as Nargis. Mother India is generally regarded as Nargis's best performance. Box Office India gave the film's net collection as ₹40 million and its gross as ₹80 million, the highest for an Indian film up until Mughal-e-Azam (1960), while estimating that Mother India's inflation-adjusted net would be equivalent to ₹1.173 billion in January 2008. Box Office India later estimated in 2017 that Mother India had over 100 million footfalls at the domestic box office, making it one of the highest-grossing Indian films of all time when adjusted for inflation. Nargis won the Filmfare Best Actress Award in 1958 and became the first Indian to receive the Best Actress award at the Karlovy Vary International Film Festival in present-day Czech Republic. Also in 1957, she acted in Pardesi (marketed as Journey Beyond Three Seas in English), which was an Indo-Soviet co-production. She married Sunil Dutt who played one of her son in Mother India. After their marriage in 1958, Nargis gave up her film career to settle down with her family, after her last few films were released. From 1951 to 1957, Box Office India ranked Nargis as the top actress.

=== 1960–1968: Final film appearances ===
She made her last film appearance in the psychological drama Raat Aur Din (1967), after being convinced to act for one last time after a long hiatus. The film was well received and Nargis' performance as a woman who has dissociative identity disorder was critically acclaimed. For her performance in the film, she received a nomination for the Filmfare Award for Best Actress, and won the inaugural National Film Award for Best Actress.

Nargis was also nominated to the Rajya Sabha (upper house of Indian Parliament) from 1980 to 1981, but due to cancer she fell ill and died during her tenure.

== Personal life ==
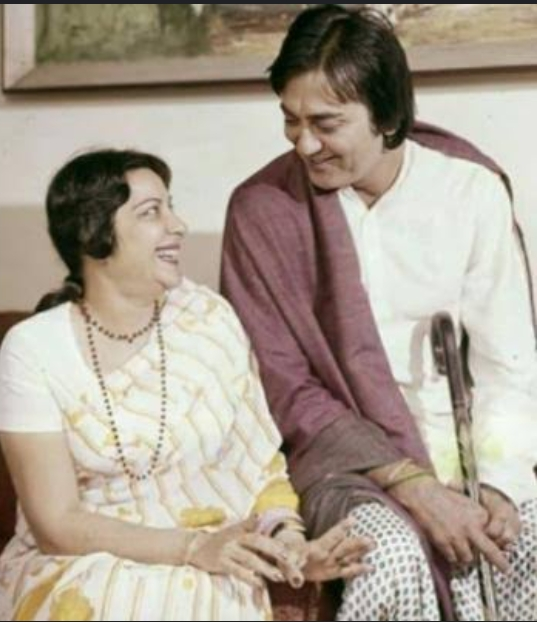
Nargis with her husband Sunil Dutt

Nargis loved wearing white saris, speaking over the telephone and eating panipuris sold on the streets. She was an excellent swimmer and enjoyed playing cricket with her brothers. The founder of the Spastic Society of India, Mithu Alur, stated in an interview that Nargis had a dream of pursuing medicine that she could never fulfill.

Nargis had a long-time relationship with actor Raj Kapoor, who was her co-star in the films Awaara and Shree 420. Raj Kapoor was married and had children. After he refused to divorce his wife, Nargis ended their nine-year-long relationship.

Reportedly, Dutt had saved her life from a fire on the sets of Mother India. Nargis married actor Sunil Dutt; who was a Hindu, on 11 March 1958. Prior to their marriage, Nargis converted to Hinduism and adopted the name Nirmala Dutt. They married in an Arya Samaj ceremony. She had also reportedly helped Dutt's sister and mother. After marrying Sunil, Nargis expressed her love and gratitude towards him by revealing that "he was the first person to treat her like a normal human being and that he was always there for her during hard times. If he hadn't come into her life, she would've ended her life". They had three children: Sanjay Dutt, Namrata Dutt, and Priya Dutt.

Sanjay went on to become a successful film actor. Namrata married actor Kumar Gaurav, son of veteran actor Rajendra Kumar who had appeared alongside Nargis and Sunil Dutt in Mother India. Priya became a politician and a Member of Parliament (Lok Sabha).

With her husband, Nargis formed the Ajanta Arts Cultural Troupe, which involved several leading actors and singers of the time, and performed at remote frontiers to entertain the Indian soldiers at border. It was the first troupe to perform in Dhaka, after the liberation war of Bangladesh in 1971. Later, Nargis worked for the cause of spastic children. She became the first patron of the Spastics Society of India. Her charitable work for the organisation got her recognition as a social worker.

== Illness and death ==
On 2 August 1980, Nargis fell ill during a session of the Rajya Sabha, with the initial cause assumed to be jaundice. She was rushed home and admitted to Breach Candy Hospital in Bombay. After 15 days of tests, during which her condition kept worsening and she rapidly lost weight, she was diagnosed with pancreatic cancer in 1980 and underwent treatment for the disease at Memorial Sloan-Kettering Cancer Center in New York City.

Upon her return to India, her condition deteriorated and she was admitted at Breach Candy Hospital. Nargis went into a coma on 2 May 1981 after she became seriously ill and died the next day, aged 51. Because she feared fire, she wanted to be buried in accordance with the Muslim customs. Her body was carried on a bier according to Hindu customs. Sunil and Sanjay offered Namaz along with other mourners. She was buried at Bada Qabrastan Mumbai. Before her death, she had made it clear to Sunil that she wanted to be buried next to her late mother. On 7 May 1981, at the premiere of her son's debut film Rocky, one seat was kept vacant for her.

One year after her death, the Nargis Dutt Memorial Cancer Foundation was established by Sunil Dutt in her memory. Although Nargis' death is attributed to pancreatic cancer, her daughter, Namrata Dutt Kumar, claimed her mother had successfully fought the cancer but died from a urinary tract infection. Nargis's son, Sanjay Dutt, added that her lowered immunity levels made her susceptible to the infection.

== Public image ==
Nargis is regarded as one of the greatest and finest actress of Indian cinema. Rediff.com placed her in its "Bollywood's Best Actresses of all time" list, and later in 2011, listed her as the greatest actress of all time, stating: "An actress with range, style, grace and an incredibly warm screen presence, Nargis is truly a leading lady to celebrate." In 2022, she was placed in Outlook India's "75 Best Bollywood Actresses" list. One of the highest paid actress of the 1950s, Nargis appeared in Box Office India's "Top Actresses" list from 1948 to 1957, and topped the list for eight years (1951–1957). Box Office India later named her as the "Best Actress" of the 1950–1959 period.

Nargis's sarees were a major style statement in the 1950s. In 2013, an Eastern Eye poll named her as the sixth greatest Bollywood star of all time. Yahoo! placed her 3rd in its "Ten most iconic beauties of Hindi cinema" list, In 2000, she was honoured with "Best Actress of the Millennium" by Hero Honda and film magazine Stardust. and was listed in the 25 greatest Asian actors in history by CNN in 2010. In 2021, Time Out placed her 2nd in its "Ten best Bollywood actresses" list. Her films Awaara and Mother India were voted some of the greatest films ever made in polls by British Film Institute and News18.

== Artistry and legacy ==
=== Acting style and reception ===
Nargis was known for her female characters that stood "shoulder-to-shoulder" with the male characters. Along with Madhubala, she also had large fan following in Greece. She is regarded among the finest and most versatile actresses of Indian cinema. She was especially noted for her portrayal of strong, independent woman in her films.

Samriddhi Patwa of Filmfare termed Nargis an "iconic actresses" and noted, "Known for her portrayal as a sophisticated and independent woman in her films, Nargis is regarded as one of the greatest actresses in the history of Indian cinema." Writing for Indian Express, Sampada Sharma stated, "With her work, Nargis left an impression that still remains unmatched." M.L. Dhawan from The Tribune said, "In almost all her films Nargis created a woman who could be desired and deified. The charisma of Nargis's screen image lay in that it oscillated between the simple and the chic with equal ease." Surendra Kumar of The Sunday Guardian stated, "She was a versatile actor who could carry off serious roles, light roles and even comic roles with the same élan. She could be urbane and sophisticated, as in Awaara, Chori Chori and Andaz; simple and ordinary, as in Sri 420; and every inch a traditional village woman, as in Mother India." Dinesh Raheja of Rediff.com said, "Whereas most actors have one definitive forte, Nargis won over the 1950s audiences and critics with strikingly versatile characterisations."

"Multiple personality disorder isn´t something that you see often in films. Nargis´ chilling portrayal brought out all the horror of a person suffering from such a malady. Her face changes when from the docile wife Varuna she turns into the cabaret dancer Peggy. You get the feeling that all her living-life-to-the hilt act is but enforced mirth. The best thing is that her madness isn´t your routine filmi melodrama but a slow descent towards the mouth of hell. She´s a must watch in Awaara and Andaz as well."

— Filmfare on Nargis's performance in Raat Aur Din (1967)

=== Legacy ===
A scene from the 1949 film Barsaat, featuring Raj Kapoor holding Nargis in one arm and a violin in the other, was chosen as the basis for the logo of R. K. Films. Praising her and Kapoor's pair, India Times wrote: "Whenever Raj Kapoor and Nargis came together on screen, sparks flew. Their chemistry was electrifying and it crackles with raw passion in Raj Kapoor's Awaara. Nargis's wild and carefree sensuality pulsates and Raj Kapoor's scruffy hair-rebellious persona only adds fuel to the fire". In November 1956, Nargis was sent to the Soviet Union by the Government of India, as a part of delegate - consisting of Raj Kapoor, Suraiya and Kamini Kaushal, where her films were screened. Filmfare later included Nargis's performances in Raat Aur Din and Mother India in its list of "80 Iconic Performances" of Bollywood, placing them 65th and 36th respectively.

== Accolades ==
=== Civilian award ===
Year	Award	Work	Result	Ref.
1958	Padma Shri	Contribution in the field of Arts	Honoured	

=== Film Awards ===
Year	Award	Category	Work	Result	Ref.
1958	Filmfare Awards	Best Actress	Mother India	Won	
1958	Karlovy Vary International Film Festival	Best Actress	Mother India	Won	
1968	National Film Awards	National Film Award for Best Actress	Raat Aur Din	Won	
1969	Filmfare Awards	Best Actress	Raat Aur Din	Nominated	
2001	Stardust Awards	Best Actress of the Millennium	—N/a	Honoured	

== Tributes and honors ==
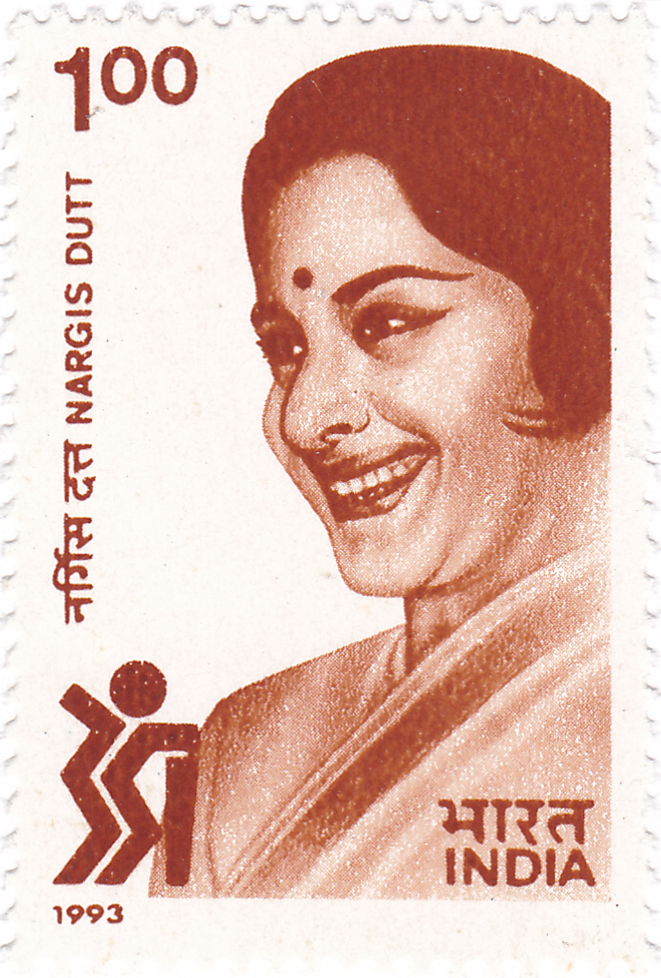
Nargis on a stamp of India, in 1993

Streets in Bandra, Mumbai and Model Colony, Pune, are named Nargis Dutt Road in her memory. A postal stamp of face value 100 paise was issued by India Post was issued in Nargis' honour on 30 December 1993. The National Film Awards honoured Dutt by instituting the Nargis Dutt Award for Best Feature Film on National Integration upon her achievement in Hindi Cinema. Her name was removed from the awards in 2024, for unknown reasons.

Nargis was inducted into the Walk of the Stars, at Bandra Bandstand, where her autograph was preserved under the name Nargis Dutt. In 2015, Google celebrated Nargis's 86th birthday with a doodle and noted, "Nagris lifted her ghoonghat headpiece and blazed the silver screen with her portrayal of strong women protagonists". In 2016, Bhaichand Patel wrote about Nargis in his book "Bollywood's Top 20: Superstars of Indian Cinema". In 2023, an exhibition at Kiran Nadar Museum of Art in Noida, named "Sitaare Zameen Par", had portraits of Nargis that were captured by JH Thakkar. Her souvenirs were auctioned online, along with that of other actresses, in the same year.

== In popular culture ==
=== Biographies ===
- In 1994, T. J. S. George wrote the first biography on Nargis, titled The Life and Times of Nargis.
- In 2007, Nargis' daughters Priya and Namrata published a book about the lives of their parents, titled, Mr. and Mrs. Dutt: Memories of our Parents. Also that year, Darlingji: The True Love Story of Nargis and Sunil Dutt was released by Kishwar Desai.

=== In film ===
- Priyanka Chopra parodied Nargis, Madhubala and Meena Kumari in the 2007 film Salaam-e-Ishq.
- In Aditya Chopra's 2008 film Rab Ne Bana Di Jodi's song "Phir Milenge Chalte Chalte", Kajol dressed herself as Nargis as a tribute to her look in Shree 420's song "Pyar Hua Iqrar Hua".
- In 2018, actress Manisha Koirala played Nargis in her son's biopic Sanju. The film was the highest grossing Indian film of 2018.
- Actress Feryna Wazheir portrayed Nargis in the 2018 film Manto.
