= Production of Pakeezah =

Production of the 1972 Indian film Pakeezah

Pakeezah (transl. The Pure One) is a 1972 Indian Hindustani-language musical romantic drama film written, directed, and produced by Kamal Amrohi. The film focuses on a dejected courtesan (Meena Kumari), who seeks a solution to her grief by attempting to run away from her kotha. The rest of the film follows the romance story between her and a forest ranger (Raaj Kumar), and her marriage which is rejected by his family because of her professional background.

Amrohi wanted to make a film that was dedicated to his wife, Kumari, so he began conceiving the story based on the legend of Anarkali after the release of their poorly received collaborative film, Daaera. When his contemporary K. Asif started the development of Mughal-e-Azam, whose plot is on the same subject, Amrohi started to write an original story of a nautch girl. The screenplay was started in 1956 in Mahabaleshwar with help from Akhtar ul Iman and Madhusudan, whom he asked to expand it. Advertisements for the film were first published in 1958, and the film faced several changes in title.

Principal photography started in 1956 and was handled by the German cinematographer Josef Wirsching. The original plan was to film Pakeezah in black and white but Amrohi decided doing so entirely in colour on Kumari's recommendation. Impacted by Kumari's stardom, the process was sluggish, for which the film became known for its lengthy production time. After her and Amrohi's separation, Pakeezah was left abandoned before being revived in 1969 and completely finished, along with its editing, in 1971; many cinematographers replaced Wirsching's position as he died in 1967.

The classic film Pakeezah was partly filmed at various locations around Aurangabad and Khuldabad. Several scenes and songs were also shot near Khizri Talab and Himayat Bagh during the 1960s.

== Pre-production ==
=== Development ===
The filmmaker Kamal Amrohi and actress Meena Kumari were married in 1952, and made Daaera (1953), a film based on their relationship. Although it received positive feedback from critics, the film under-performed at the box office. Daaera's commercial failure left Amrohi feeling insecure about his career, and he wanted to make a film that would establish him as a filmmaker, be a tribute to Kumari, and reflect his love for her. Amrohi planned a film based on the legend of Anarkali, which would star Kumari as the courtesan opposite Kamal Kapoor. The project was abandoned when another film on a similar subject, Mughal-e-Azam (1960), was being developed by K. Asif, who also assigned Amrohi to write dialogue for it. Amrohi felt rivalled and was motivated to make a film that was aesthetically better than Asif's. Amrohi started conceiving a story of a nautch girl in the mid-1950s, with the biographer Vinod Mehta stating that "mentally [he] began outlining" it in South India in 1955.

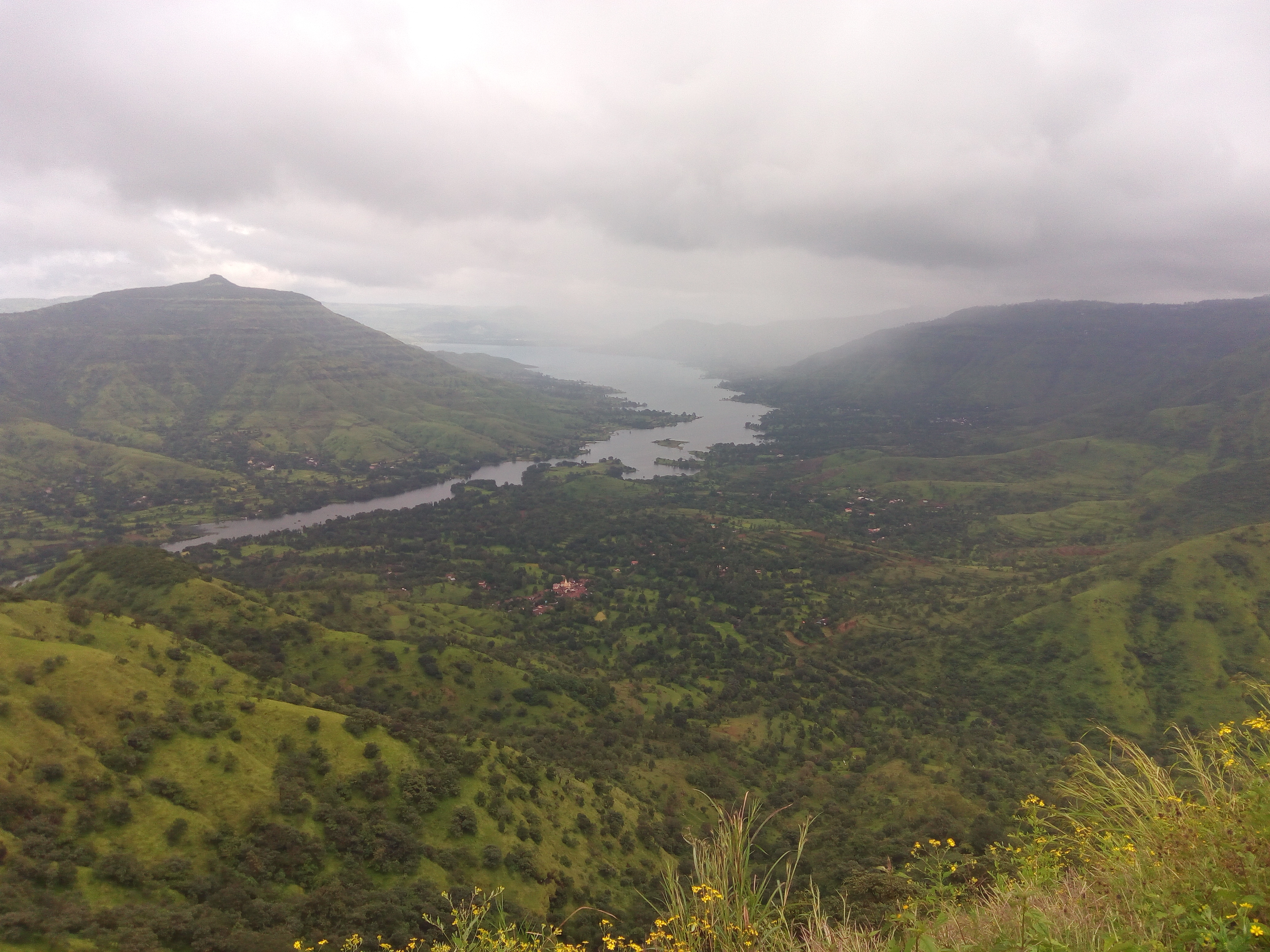
The screenwriting of Pakeezah took place in Mahabaleshwar

Starting in May or July 1956, Amrohi wrote the screenplay in Mahabaleshwar. At that time, many films with similar themes had vulgar scenes; not wanting Pakeezah to do the same, he made the screenplay more realistic and unvulgarised. During the process, Amrohi used to read the film's dialogue to Kumari and asked for her opinions. In 1958, he asked Akhtar ul Iman and Madhusudan to expand the screenplay. In discussion, they "would frequently argue and within no time, all three would start talking in raised voices". Only Amrohi, however, was credited as the screenwriter; Madhusudan filed a suit against Amrohi to India's Film Producers' Association, which Madhusudan won. Although Amrohi was fined ₹50,000 (US$520), he only paid ₹20,000 (US$210) of this. Several scenes were inspired by Amrohi's life; for instance the dining-table sequence in which women would put on their veils when meeting elders. The writing was ended in 1960.

Before being titled Pakeezah, the film's title underwent several changes. Pakeeza was recorded in the film's pre-release announcements; the earliest instance was printed in Screen magazine in January 1958. The press continuously reported the film under the title until 1969, when production resumed. Desai did not explain the causes of the changes but quoted a number of Screen articles that reported the film as Pakeeza. An article at Scroll.in said Pakeeza was the original title and a 'h' was added to make it sound more melancholic. Mehta contradicted this, saying Pakeezah had been always the film's title and that although alternative titles were suggested, the earliest one was retained. Agreeing with Mehta, Padhye added it was done for numerological reasons. When production was revived, Aromhi's associates recommended the alternative Lahu Pukarega but Amrohi was not satisfied because this title was less "lyrical and sweet" than Pakeezah.

Pakeezah was to be produced by Filmistan, but Amrohi decided to produce it himself under his Mahal Pictures company, founded in 1953, in association with Sangeeta Enterprises. An official ceremony to announce the film was held on either 17 January 1957, which coincided with Amrohi's birthday, or 18 January 1958. (Note: Sources report the actual date of the event inconsistently.) Advertisements for Pakeezah, then untitled and publicised as a black-and-white project in CinemaScope, started to be published in August 1957. Satyen Bose was advertised as the director and Amrohi as the story-and-screenplay writer. The plan was changed; Amrohi replaced Bose's position. Desai observed that most early reports of the film focused on the places Amrohi and Kumari visited while planning the filming. By October 1958, the couple had visited various locations in North India, including those in Delhi, Lucknow, Shimla, Ujjain, Varanasi, Aurangabad and Daulatabad, and Mysore in South India. The same month Amrohi announced the film would be made in Technicolor, though the final film was entirely in Eastmancolor.

=== Casting ===
Taking a salary of ₹1 (1.0¢ US), Kumari played the roles of Nargis and her daughter Sahibjaan, the central characters of the film. She was also involved as the costume designer and helped casting. Since the film was dedicated to his wife, Amrohi focussed the film's story entirely on her characters. Acknowledged as one of the most successful actresses from mid-1950s to 1960s, Amrohi believed no film was able to capture Kumari's essence as an established actor. Kumari regarded Pakeezah as herself, as did Amrohi; she was particularly drawn to her characters and found their stories similar to her own—both having a "desire to love and [to] be loved". She called the film a reflection of her life and "the vision which has haunted his soul for as long as I can remember".

Before 1969, there was no mention of the male leads. In 1958, Amrohi stated he would play Salim because he could not find a suitable actor for the role, though he abandoned the idea because he found it difficult to act and direct at the same time. He considered actors Ashok Kumar, Atma Ram, Dharmendra, Raaj Kumar, Rajendra Kumar, Sunil Dutt, and Pradeep Kumar for the role. Dharmendra was one of the first actors cast for it. (Note: The author Mohan Deep wrote Dharmendra was Amrohi's first choice for the role of Salim. Mehta disagreed, saying it was Ashok Kumar who got the offer first before it went to Dharmendra. The biographer Kishore Valicha said Kumar was considered for a "lead role opposite Meena Kumari" when the film's pre-production began in the 1950s. A 2005 article published in Stardust confirmed Deep's claims, and added that the role was originally not that of a forest ranger but was modified to the character to adjust to Kumar's physique.) Amrohi regarded his physical features most appropriate for the role of a forest ranger. Days into filming, Amrohi noticed Kumari "got on too well" with Dharmendra, which distracted her from filming. Mehta noted Amrohi's possessiveness motivated him to remove Dharmendra from the cast; the biographer Mohan Deep said it was because Amrohi had heard rumours of their romantic relationship.

Ashok Kumar played Shahbuddin, Sahibjaan's father. He was originally cast in 1958 as Salim but the plan was abandoned after several days of filming, and he got the role of Shahbuddin when filming was resumed. Raaj Kumar became the final choice for the role; Pakeezah was his second collaboration with Amrohi after the hospital-set romantic drama Dil Apna Aur Preet Parai (1960), which served as his third with Kumari, having starred jointly in Ardhangini and Shararat (both 1959). Amrohi liked Raaj Kumar's deep voice and his eloquence in the Hindustani language. When the role was offered to Raaj Kumar, he was initially hesitant to play such a challenging role but later agreed to do so, noting his pleasure of working with the filmmaker. He joined the cast in 1968 but it was announced a year later. The already-filmed partial ending with Dharmendra, whose face was covered by a long veil of flowers, was retained until the end of production; Raaj Kumar appears only in parts in which he lifts up the veil.

Mehtab was originally offered the role of Gauharjaan, but her unwillingness to wear dresses she did not choose herself upset Amrohi. Durga Khote was then recommended, before it was given to Kumari's friend Nadira. Gauharjaan and Nawabjaan (Veena) were originally a single character. Deep stated that Nadira, who was paid ₹15,000 (US$160), frequently took a bottle of whisky to the sets and drank it with Kumari in the latter's make-up room; this annoyed Amrohi, leading him to split Nadira's role into two characters. According to Amrohi's biographer Anita Padhye, Amrohi was exasperated because he could not stand Nadira's demands "since she thought she was a star in her own right". He wanted to minimize her importance, adding another character called Nawabjaan, with which her remaining scenes would be filmed. Stardust said "he just sat down and wrote a line of dialogue that created a fresh character and Veena came in as an additional character".

== Production ==
=== Production design ===
Pakeezah's sets were largely inspired by Amrohi's haveli (townhouse) in Amroha, his hometown. Although N. B. Kulkarni was credited as the art director, film historians believed Amrohi also made significant contributions in this aspect. According to Padhye, he sketched the sets in colour and asked Kulkarni to perfect them. The constructions were considered to be unusual at the time; while most film sets used plywood for walls, Pakeezah's sets were made of cloth first and then covered with plywood, upon which muslin was stuck and finally painted. In consequence, the walls appeared rough and Padhye noted even a nail could be seen from outside the sets. Amrohi was known for his perfectionism; if he found one crooked nail, he would tell the workers, "This nail is hurting my heart", and immediately ask them to fix it. Chandeliers imported from Belgium were used for lighting.

The four-storey Bazaar-e-Husn, referring to the location at which the song "Inhin Logon Ne" was filmed, was built at Filmistan between six months and one-and-a-half years. The set was constructed by 600 workers on a budget of over ₹1 million (US$10,000). During construction, Amrohi visited the location for checks every day. According to the film's advertisements, hundreds of girls were trained for months for the sequence but Amrohi's son Tajdar said only 16 girls are shown in the film. Dozens of shops across India were moved to the set for over a year, resulting in compensation from their owners, which bloated the film's budget. Another extravagant set called Gulabi Mahal was built for the filming of the song "Chalte Chalte". The set was noted for its size and aesthetics, and was frequently compared to that in "Pyar Kiya To Darna Kya" of the 1960 film Mughal-e-Azam. Although it has Mughal-style architecture, several Greek statues were also placed in it.

=== Filming ===
Pakeezah's filming process, which was considered lengthy for its period, has been what made the film known. Principal photography, most of which was done on sets built at Filmistan, was started by the German cinematographer Josef Wirsching on 16 July 1956, with the filming of "Inhin Logon Ne" in black and white. Pakeezah was the third Indian film to use CinemaScope, after Guru Dutt's Kaagaz Ke Phool (1959) and Ram Mukherjee's Leader (1964). Amrohi went to Metro-Goldwyn-Mayer (MGM) in California, United States, to rent lenses for ₹50,000 (US$520) a month but was unsatisfied by the result; close-ups using the lens blurred the actors' faces. After the dailies were sent to MGM, it was discovered that the lens's focus was off by 1^{/1000} millimeter. In appreciation, MGM waived the rentals fees for the lenses. On Kumari's recommendation, Amrohi changed his plans to make the film in black-and-white, and in 1958, he started to make it entirely in colour with Eastmancolor.

Filming progressed intermittently. Since Kumari was at the peak of her career in the 1950s and 1960s, she had allocated dates for many films and was only able to be on-set for Pakeezah for several days each month. Amrohi's perfectionism made him conscientious about every detail and would delay a scene if he felt there was an error. A twenty-day schedule in Old Delhi was finished on 8 April 1960, and a fifteen-day schedule at Khapara Bridge near Bombay (present-day Mumbai) was finished on 18 November. By early 1964, ₹4 million (US$42,000) had been spent on the film, especially the sets. Also that year, Amrohi and Kumari separated due to personal differences but never actually divorced. Kumari started becoming addicted to alcohol, and four years later was diagnosed with cirrhosis, forcing her to routinely go abroad for treatments. Pakeezah was abandoned as a result.

"In regard to my working in Pakeezah, I have always been willing and clamouring to work. Pakeezah is my life dream and it will be my greatest pleasure to see it completed. As for my remuneration, I am glad you have given me an opportunity to prove my regards and respect for you. I shall accept only one guinea as a token of goodwill for my entire work in Pakeezah."

— Kumari's reply letter to Amrohi, 1969

It took a year for Amrohi to restore his equanimity after the separation. He considered recasting to replace Kumari but scrapped the idea because he could not find a suitable substitute. In a November 1965 issue of the Journal of the Film Industry, he wrote; "Even if death comes I will ask her to wait till I complete Pakeezah which is the great ambition of my life". The husband-wife team Sunil Dutt and Nargis, both of whom were Kumari's friends and had seen the film's rushes in 1968, also asked Kumari to not leave the film unfinished. On 25 August, Amrohi wrote a letter to Kumari:

... only Pakeezah's completion remain unsettled. You have made a condition that unless I give you a divorce you will not complete Pakeezah ... After this, if you wish to complete 'your Pakeezah'. I would be the most happy to do so. This is my request, that Pakeezah, on which the fortune of many people depends and which had the good wishes of so many people, should not be left uncompleted if possible.

Filming was resumed on 16 March 1969. Amrohi invited the press to witness Kumari's return and made a documentary on it. Kuldip Singh financed Pakeezah, lending Amrohi ₹1 million (US$10,000). Wirsching had died in 1967; cinematographers including Nariman Irani, Rajindar Maloni, Fali Mistry, Jal Mistry, Keki Mistry, V. K. Murthy, R. D. Mathur, Arvind Lad and Ramchandra replaced him. Kumari was ill and was unable to dance, a vital part of the film. Padma Khanna was appointed as her body double, and the makeup artist Joshi Dada did her makeup. Padhye said the makeup was so perfect the audience would not notice it was not Kumari on the screen. Kumari's dancing scenes were filmed on close-up and when she was sitting. In November 1971, filming was completed and the editing, finished a month later, was done by D. N. Pai. From a 35,000 ft (11,000 m) reel, he maintained 14,000 ft (4,300 m). The background score was composed by Naushad and arranged by Kersi Lord.

== Soundtrack ==
Ghulam Mohammed composed the soundtrack to Pakeezah, except for the alap (title song) sequence, which Naushad composed. Amrohi, Kaifi Azmi, Majrooh Sultanpuri, and Kaif Bhopali served as the lyricists. The songs were mostly performed by Lata Mangeshkar; Kumari, Parveen Sultana, Vani Jairam, Rajkumari Dubey, Mohammed Rafi, Shamshad Begum, Suman Kalyanpur, and the newcomer Shobha Gurtu also contributed to the vocals. Nine songs that were not used for the film were released in 1977 as Pakeezah: Rang Barang.

Mohammed was not successful as a music director; by mid-1961, twelve of his films had consecutively been declared failures at the box office. Nevertheless, Amrohi was impressed by his work in Mirza Ghalib (1954), which won the Best Feature Film trophy at the 2nd National Film Awards. The soundtrack recording started in December 1955 but was interrupted when Mohammed suffered a heart attack, but he finished the soundtrack the same year, before the filming commenced. The 1960s marked the rise of the rock and roll genre in Bollywood films; after Mohammed's death in 1963, distributors suggested Amrohi replace him with a more-commercial composer but Amrohi refused to do so, insisting on keeping Mohammed's work. The music for the alap and background score remained uncomposed, and by the time production restarted, Amrohi chose Naushad to finish both because distributors persisted with their recommendation.

Pakeezah's soundtrack was popular among Asian audiences, becoming one of the best-selling Bollywood soundtracks of the 1970s. The annual Binaca Geetmala placed "Inhi Logon Ne" and "Chalte Chalte" at the second and third position, respectively, in their listings of the most-listened-to filmi songs of 1972. The soundtrack album received widespread critical acclaim. Girija Rajendran of The Illustrated Weekly of India listened to its preview; he praised the atmosphere of the songs and said it enhances the film's storyline of prostitution. In 2005, the album was included in 20th position on the all-time greatest Hindi soundtrack list by voters of the BBC Asian Network. The Asian-British radio station conducted another vote, this time for the greatest Bollywood songs, and "Chalte Chalte" was voted tenth. The songs also found a place in the 2011 book 1001 Songs You Must Hear Before You Die. The album made it to The Guardian's 2013 listing of the top-ten Indian cinema soundtracks.

== Bibliography ==
- Ahmed, Omar (7 April 2015). Studying Indian Cinema. Columbia University Press. ISBN 978-09-93238-49-9.
- Bharatan, Raju (1995). Lata Mangeshkar: A Biography. UBS Publishers' Distributors. ISBN 978-81-74760-23-4.
- Bharatan, Raju (2013). Naushadnama: The Life and Music of Naushad. New Delhi, India: Hay House. ISBN 978-93-81431-93-1.
- Bose, Derek (10 January 2004). Kishore Kumar: Method in Madness. Rupa Publications. ISBN 978-81-29105-26-4.
- Deep, Mohan (1998). Simply Scandalous: Meena Kumari. Mumbai, India: Image Books. OCLC 606456998.
- Desai, Meghnad (30 September 2013). Pakeezah: An Ode to a Bygone World. HarperCollins. ISBN 978-93-50293-69-0.
- Dimery, Robert, ed. (2011) [2010]. 1001 Songs You Must Hear Before You Die. Cassell. ISBN 978-1-84403-684-4.
- Gardish, Ghulam Rizvi (2000). Makers of Indian Literature: Akhtaruliman. Sahitya Akademi. ISBN 978-81-26009-20-6.
- Gulzar; Nihalani, Govind; Chatterjee, Saibal (26 February 2003). Encyclopaedia of Hindi Cinema. Encyclopædia Britannica, Inc. ISBN 978-81-7991-066-5.
- Jain, Madhu (25 February 2016) [2009]. Narratives of Indian Cinema. Primus Books. ISBN 978-81-90891-84-4.
- Mehta, Vinod (10 July 2013) [1972]. Meena Kumari: The Classic Biography. HarperCollins. ISBN 978-93-50296-27-1.
- Nayar, Udaya Tara (20 June 2014). Dilip Kumar: The Substance and the Shadow. Hay House. ISBN 978-93-81398-86-9.
- Padhye, Anita (2003). Ishqaacha Zahari Pyala [The Poisoned Choice of Love] (in Marathi). Dimple Publications. OCLC 500305460.
- Padhye, Anita (15 July 2020). Ten Classics. Manjul Publishing House Pvt. Ltd. ISBN 978-93-89647-82-2.
- Pinto, Jerry (2006). Helen: The Life and Times of an H-Bomb. Penguin Books. ISBN 978-01-43031-24-6.
- Rajadhyaksha, Ashish; Willemen, Paul, eds. (1998) [1994]. Encyclopaedia of Indian Cinema. British Film Institute and Oxford University Press. ISBN 0-19-563579-5.
- Ruhela, Satya Pal (1998). Empowerment of the Indian Muslim Women. M. D. Publications. ISBN 978-81-75330-63-4.
- Somaaya, Bhawana (12 February 2003). The Story So Far. Indian Express Group. ISBN 978-81-223-1016-0.
- Valicha, Kishore (1996). Dadamoni: The Authorized Biography of Ashok Kumar. Viking Press. ISBN 978-06-70872-71-8.
- Zaveri, Hanif (2005). Mehmood, a Man of Many Moods. Popular Prakashan. ISBN 978-81-79912-13-3.
