= Pakeezah =

1972 film by Kamal Amrohi

- Theatrical release poster
- Directed by: Kamal Amrohi
- Written by: Kamal Amrohi
- Produced by: Kamal Amrohi
- Starring: Meena Kumari; Ashok Kumar; Raaj Kumar
- Cinematography: Josef Wirsching
- Edited by: D. N. Pai
- Music by: Songs: Ghulam Mohammed; Naushad; Score: Naushad
- Production companies: Mahal Pictures; Sangeeta Enterprises
- Release date: 4 February 1972
- Running time: 147–175 minutes (Note: Sources differ on the film's runtime; Amazon Prime Video has it 147 minutes, the British Board of Film Classification has it 153 minutes, and the Encyclopaedia of Indian Cinema has it 175 minutes.)
- Country: India
- Language: Hindustani
- Budget: ₹12.5–15 million
- Box office: est. ₹60 million

Pakeezah (Hindustani pronunciation: [ˈpaːkiːzaː]; transl. The Pure One) is a 1972 Indian musical romantic drama written, directed, and produced by Kamal Amrohi. The film stars Meena Kumari as the eponymous lead, alongside Ashok Kumar and Raaj Kumar. It tells the story of Sahibjaan, a Lucknow-based tawaif. While asleep on a train, Sahibjaan receives a note from a stranger praising her beauty. Later, evacuating from a broken boat, she takes shelter in a tent and finds out its owner, a forest ranger named Salim, wrote the letter. Sahibjaan and Salim plan to get married, causing conflicts with Sahibjaan's professional background.

Amrohi, to whom Kumari was married, wanted to make a film dedicated to his wife; he began conceiving the story after the release of their collaborative film Daaera (1953). Production of the film lasted 15 years. Pakeezah's principal photography commenced in 1956 under the German cinematographer Josef Wirsching. The film faced many obstacles, particularly Kumari and Amrohi's separation in 1964 and Kumari's addiction to alcohol, which often made her unable to perform. After being postponed for many years, filming resumed in 1969 and finished in November 1971. The film's soundtrack, which became one of the highest-selling Bollywood soundtracks of the 1970s, was composed by Ghulam Mohammed and finished by Naushad, who also composed the background score.

Pakeezah, which was made on a budget of ₹12.5 million (US$130,000) to ₹15 million (US$160,000), premiered on 4 February 1972 and garnered a mixed response from critics. It was criticised for its extravagance and plot. Nevertheless, it emerged as one of the highest-grossing Hindi films of the year, grossing ₹60 million (US$620,000) after a theatrical run of over 50 weeks. Trade analysts said its popularity might have been due to Kumari's death a month after its release. The film earned her a then record-setting nomination for the Filmfare Award for Best Actress and won a Special Award at the Bengal Film Journalists' Association Awards; the film also received nominations for Best Film and Best Director (Amrohi), and won N. B. Kulkarni the Filmfare Award for Best Art Direction.

The film is known for its lengthy production time and is considered to be a milestone of the Muslim social genre. Although initial critical reception to the film was unfavourable, it greatly improved in the years after its release. The film earned widespread praise for its luxurious, sophisticated sets and costumes. Pakeezah is also known for being Meena Kumari's last film to be released during her lifetime; her performance in it has been regarded as one of the best of her career. Pakeezah has often been included in listings of the best works of Indian cinema, including a poll conducted by the British Film Institute in 2007.

== Plot ==
Nargis is a tawaif based in the Muslim quarter of Lucknow. She dreams of marrying Shahbuddin, the man she loves, but his family's patriarch Hakim Saab strongly opposes their relationship because he finds it unacceptable to welcome a tawaif as a daughter-in-law into his respected family. Dejected, Nargis flees to a nearby qabristan (cemetery) and lives there, giving birth to a daughter before dying. On her deathbed, Nargis writes Shahbuddin a letter asking him to come for his newborn daughter. Nargis' sister Nawabjaan is buying jewellery when she finds a piece that is similar to one owned by Nargis. She asks the jeweller its origin and is led to the cemetery. She finds Nargis' body and her daughter, whom she takes back to her kotha (performance house).

When Nargis' belongings are sold several years later, a man finds Nargis' letter and delivers it to Shahbuddin. Shahbuddin tracks down Nargis' now-adult daughter Sahibjaan and finds her working as tawaif at Nawabjaan's brothel. Nawabjaan, however, does not want him to take Sahibjaan away, and flees with her niece to another town. While travelling by train, a young man enters Sahibjaan's compartment and sees her sleeping. Struck by her beauty, he leaves her a note. After arriving at her destination, Sahibjaan wakes up and finds the note. She reads it and falls in love with the note's author.

A brothel patron named Nawab wishes to own Sahibjaan and takes her to his boat for a night. The boat, however, is attacked by elephants and Sahibjaan is carried away by the fast-flowing river. She is taken to the riverside tent of Salim, a forest ranger. Sahibjaan reads Salim's diary and learns it was him who had left her a note on the train. Sahibjaan feigns amnesia to avoid telling him of her profession.

Before sunset, Nawabjaan finds Sahibjaan and takes her back to the brothel. Sahibjaan keeps thinking about Salim and runs away from the brothel. She runs along the railway line and gets her gharara (clothing) stuck there. Upon seeing an approaching train, Sahibjaan panics, stumbles and faints. The train stops before in time and people come to help her. One of them is Salim, who takes her to his home.

Salim and Sahibjaan plan to elope to live peacefully but her profession makes her doubtful of the plan. When Salim anoints her to marry her, she refuses and decides to return to the brothel. Salim, who is heartbroken, eventually decides to marry someone else at his family's insistence and invites Sahibjaan to perform a mujra at his wedding. During the recital, Nawabjaan recognises Shahbuddin, Salim's paternal uncle, and calls him to witness the irony of the situation: his own daughter dancing and entertaining his family. Shahbuddin's father tries to shoot Nawabjaan to silence her but instead kills Shahbuddin who was trying to protect her. With his dying breath, Shahbuddin asks Salim to marry Sahibjaan. Salim's doli (wedding palanquin) defies convention and arrives at Sahibjaan's brothel, fulfilling Shahbuddin's dying wish.

== Cast ==
The cast is listed below:

- Meena Kumari as Nargis/Sahibjaan
- Ashok Kumar as Shahbuddin
- Raaj Kumar as Salim Ahmed Khan
- Veena as Nawabjaan
- Nadira as Gauharjaan
- D. K. Sapru as Hakim Saab
- Kamal Kapoor as Nawab Zafar Ali Khan
- Vijayalakshmi as Rashidan

== Production ==
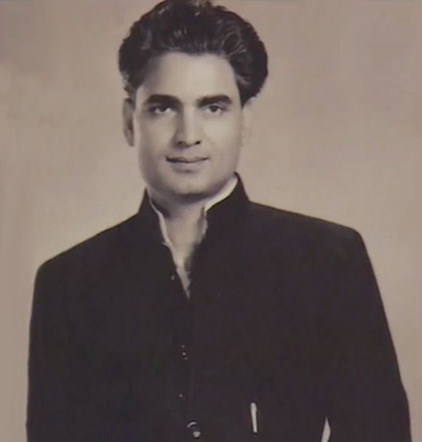
The director, Amrohi, conceived the film as a tribute to his wife, Kumari

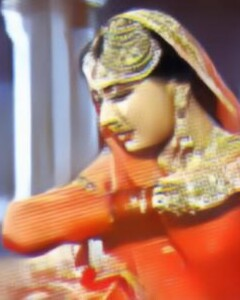
Meena Kumari in the film

The filmmaker Kamal Amrohi and actress Meena Kumari were married in 1952, and made Daaera (1953), a film based on their relationship. Although it received positive feedback from critics, the film under-performed at the box office. Daaera's commercial failure left Amrohi feeling insecure about his career, and he wanted to make a film that would both establish him as a filmmaker and be a tribute to Kumari, reflecting his love for her. Amrohi started conceiving a story of a nautch girl in the mid-1950s. Starting in May or July 1956, Amrohi wrote the screenplay in Mahabaleshwar. At that time, many films with similar themes had vulgar scenes; not wanting Pakeezah to be similar, he made the screenplay more "realistic [and] unvulgarised". Amrohi had Kumari in mind while finalising it, and while writing read the film's dialogues to her and asked for her opinion. In 1958, he asked Akhtar ul Iman and Madhusudan to expand the screenplay.

Charging only ₹1 (1.0¢ US), Kumari played the roles of Nargis and her daughter Sahibjaan, the central characters of the film. She was also involved as the costume designer and helped with casting. Since the film was dedicated to his wife, Amrohi focused the film's story entirely on her characters. In 1958, Amrohi stated he would play Salim because he could not find a suitable actor for the role, but he abandoned the idea because he found it difficult to act and direct at the same time. Ashok Kumar was cast in 1958 for the role but the plan was abandoned after several days of filming, and he got the role of Shahbuddin when filming was resumed. After considering a number of actors, Raaj Kumar became the final choice for the part; Pakeezah was his second collaboration with Amrohi after the medical romantic drama Dil Apna Aur Preet Parai (1960). He joined the cast in 1968 but it was only announced a year later. Principal photography was started by the German cinematographer Josef Wirsching on 16 July 1956. Pakeezah used CinemaScope. On Kumari's recommendation, Amrohi changed his plans to make the film in black-and-white, and in 1958, he started to make it entirely in colour with Eastmancolor. Filming progressed intermittently, largely determined by Kumari's availability during the 1950s. By early 1964, ₹4 million (US$42,000) had been spent on the film, with particular focus on the sets. Also that year, Amrohi and Kumari separated due to personal differences but never actually divorced. In 1969, Kumari agreed to resume work on the film, and shooting restarted on 16 March. Amrohi invited the press to witness Kumari's return and made a documentary on it. Filming was completed in November 1971, and the editing, finished a month later, was done by D. N. Pai. From a 35,000 ft (11,000 m) reel of film, he retained 14,000 ft (4,300 m). The background score was composed by Naushad and arranged by Kersi Lord.

Ghulam Mohammed composed the soundtrack of Pakeezah, except for the alap (title song) sequence, which Naushad himself composed. Amrohi, Kaifi Azmi, Majrooh Sultanpuri, and Kaif Bhopali served as the lyricists. Mohammed did not have a successful career, but Amrohi had seen and appreciated his work on the biographical drama Mirza Ghalib (1954). Recording started in December 1955, but was interrupted when Mohammed suffered a heart attack; nevertheless, he finished the soundtrack the same year. The 1960s marked the rise of the rock and roll genre in Bollywood films; after Mohammed's death in 1963, distributors suggested Amrohi replace him with a more commercial composer, but Amrohi refused to do so, insisting on keeping Mohammed's work. What remained uncomposed were the music for the alap and background score, and by the time production restarted, Amrohi chose Naushad to finish both because distributors persisted with their recommendation.

== Release ==
Indian journalist Vinod Mehta and the author Bunny Reuben state that Pakeezah generated considerable pre-release anticipation; contrarily, authors Mohan Deep and Meghnad Desai say because of the lengthy production time, anticipation decreased up to the film's theatrical release. On 30 January 1972, The Illustrated Weekly of India carried an article by Kamal Amrohi, saying that he doubted Kumari could deliver a good performance at the age of almost 40. Filmfare published a promotional blurb of the film. A preview of Pakeezah was held for critics; Desai reported Amrohi was depressed because the film attracted more criticism than appreciation, which led him to go home drunk that night.

Amrohi originally set the film's release for 1971 but it was postponed due to the India–Pakistan war. Pakeezah premiered at Maratha Mandir, Bombay, on 4 February 1972; Kumari attended the opening with Amrohi, his son Tajdar, and Raaj Kumar. The composer Mohammed Zahur Khayyam called the film "priceless". According to an estimate by Box Office India, it was the highest-grossing Hindi film of the year, grossing ₹60 million (US$620,000). Mint estimated its net profit to be ₹30 million (US$310,000). Pakeezah initially opened to mediocre box-office returns but the film emerged as a sleeper hit and ran for over 50 weeks, in 33 of which it was fully booked. Film observers credited these boosts to the audience's sympathy, given Kumari's death a month later. Amrohi said two weeks after its release, trade analysts called the film a major commercial success and added that the pre-release advertisements led it its success.

In late 1973, Pakeezah became the first film to be aired on Amritsar TV Centre, a television channel established in September 1973 in Amritsar, India, for broadcasting to Lahore, Pakistan. The film unexpectedly received a highly enthusiastic response from Pakistani viewers and people from other parts of India went to Lahore to watch it. According to Desai, public arrangements using big-screen televisions at traffic intersections were made for screening the film. Consequently, Amritsar TV started airing more films with similar themes. Due to the success of the televising of Pakeezah, few people visited cinemas on that day, leading the owners, who faced financial failure, to demand a ban on airing the film. Since then, Pakeezah has frequently been broadcast on television. In 2005, Tajdar informed a Stardust interviewer its rights had been sold for the next 50 years.

== Critical reception ==
=== Initial ===
Upon its premiere, Pakeezah's plot received mixed reviews from the Indian English-language press but according to Mehta, Urdu reviewers showed more enthusiasm, praising the historicity and sensitive, moving performances. The Times of India was highly critical of Pakeezah, describing it as a "lavish waste". Thought magazine panned the storyline of a prostitute as irrelevant for the 1970s but complimented the technical aspects, including the colour cinematography and Amrohi's dedication to continuing production of the film for such a long time. The Thought writer also added that the film's dialogue uses many metaphors, especially a scene in which Sahibjaan has a monologue about the letter she finds on the train, and considered it to be excessively philosophical and unnatural. Writing for Filmfare, S. J. Banaji gave the film a one-star rating, indicating "very poor" for the publication's standard, and criticised the film's narrative:

The trouble is Kamal Amrohi can't decide which way he wants to go. He starts with a couple eloping in a couch, but for the rest about the only period flavour to the tale is the self-conscious way he's kept motor-cars out of the street scenes! He keeps hovering between fantasy and realism and often the world outside seems more interesting—those shots of a passing train, for instance, to suggest the heroine's thoughts recurring to the man she never met ... Nobody seems very sure whether the heroine's playing prostitute or virgin—not even the heroine.

Nirmal Kumar Ghosh reviewed Pakeezah positively for Amrita Bazar Patrika, saying the popular belief among critics of the time was that the film's "overabundant wealth of dramatic conviction wrapped in superb cinematic fluidity is slow to its core". He thought its slowness makes the film "in perfect tune with its core, its world of hasteless fragrance, as if in terms of a sad-sweet dream which weaves its own slow spell while the outer world of time keeps ticking". Ghosh predicted it would be "a standing testimony to the great heights of tragedy that a peerless actress-tragedienne of Kumari's calibre could climb to achieve deathlessness". While praising the film for promoting Muslim culture, Mehta saw Kumari's performance as "not genius" and commented; "While she was dancing, I would have preferred more lust. While she was playful, I would have preferred more frivolity. While she was briefly happy, I would have preferred more joy. While she was resigned, I would have preferred more fatalism."

=== Contemporary ===
Critical reception to Pakeezah has significantly improved since its release, with widespread praise directed towards Kumari's performance; contemporary critics have described the film as "iconic" a "classic", and a magnum opus. In the 1988 book One Hundred Indian Feature Films: An Annotated Filmography, Anil Srivastava and Shampa Banerjee wrote the film recreates "a lost era of decadence, and the world of high-class courtesans who were artistes in their own right", accompanied by "an incredible romance which cannot be contained within a rational or a casual framework". In 1999, Derek Malcolm of The Guardian described it as a mixture of poetry, fantasy and nostalgia, commenting; "If there is nothing special about the plot, the way it is accomplished is often astounding. Amrohi ... saturates the screen not only with some amazing colour photography but with a swirling romanticism that somehow never tips over into the laughable". Malcolm included his review for The Guardian in his book, A Century of Films (2000).

Dinesh Raheja, in 2002, commended the film's lavish production designs, saying; "its splendour fills the eye, stirs the senses. And it ultimately showcases the heart beating at the film's core." He commented that Kumari's "understated performance and moist eyes sparkling with unshed tears have a hypnotic effect", saying Raaj Kumar's presence is felt because of his character's "likeable steadfastness". In 2005, British academic Rachel Dwyer applauded Pakeezah for presenting aesthetics in the cast and the choreography, and noted "the elaboration of scenery and in particular of clothing, tied to a certain nostalgia arising from the decline and disappearance of courtesan culture". She called Kumari's character a "quintessentially romantic figure: a beautiful but tragic woman, who pours out her grief for the love she is denied in tears, poetry and dance".

Writing for The Hindu in 2008, Anjana Rajan likened reviewing Pakeezah in the 21st century to stepping "into the twilight world when India was traditional even in its approach to modernity. When courtesy and wisdom were considered as important to a civilised society as appearances and grooming. And when commercial Hindi cinema looked society in the face to point out its flaws, yet laced the statement with a sad sweetness, a searing beauty." In a review carried by the Pakistani newspaper Dawn in 2012, Raza Ali Sayeed found the plot to be "over-the-top" but said it is helped by the visuals: "From the dazzling colors of the dresses worn by the courtesans, to the beautiful set pieces which bring the world of the tawaif to life, this film is a joy to the senses". He added the dialogue is "like a long poetry recitation from start to finish", and that the film belongs to Kumari. In 2017, American critic Maitland McDonagh of TVGuide referred to Pakeezah as a "passionate, opulent Indian melodrama".

== Accolades ==
At the 20th Filmfare Awards, Pakeezah won Best Art Direction for N. B. Kulkarni, in addition to nominations for Best Film, Best Director (Amrohi), Best Actress (Kumari), Best Music Director (Mohammed) and Best Cinematography (Wirsching). The ceremony proved to be highly controversial; there was major criticism after Mohammed lost the award to the duo Shankar–Jaikishan of Be-Imaan. In protest, Pran, the winner of Best Supporting Actor for Be-Imaan, returned his trophy and said Mohammed's loss was "an insult" for India's music industry. Filmfare, however, defended their decision by stating according to their rules, posthumous awards are not allowed; Mohammed had died in 1963. Filmfare's editor B. K. Karanjia said both Kumari and Wirsching lost for the same reason. Moreover, Kumari earned a then record-setting twelfth and final nomination for the Filmfare Award for Best Actress for her performance in the musical romantic drama Pakeezah after her death in March 1972. Despite being highly favoured to win the award, she controversially lost to Hema Malini who won her first and only award in the category for her comical dual roles in the comedy-drama Seeta Aur Geeta.

Award	Date	Category	Recipient(s) and nominee(s)	Result	Ref(s)
36th Annual BFJA Awards	1973	Best Indian Films (Fourth)	Pakeezah	Won	
36th Annual BFJA Awards	1973	Best Cinematographer (Colour; Hindi)	Josef Wirsching	Won	
36th Annual BFJA Awards	1973	Best Art Director (Hindi)	N. B. Kulkarni	Won	
36th Annual BFJA Awards	1973	Best Female Playback Singer (Hindi)	Lata Mangeshkar	Won	
36th Annual BFJA Awards	1973	Best Audiographer (Hindi)	R. G. Pushalkar	Won	
36th Annual BFJA Awards	1973	Special Award	Meena Kumari	Won	
Filmfare Awards	21 April 1973	Best Film	Pakeezah	Nominated	
Filmfare Awards	21 April 1973	Best Director	Kamal Amrohi	Nominated	
Filmfare Awards	21 April 1973	Best Actress	Meena Kumari	Nominated	
Filmfare Awards	21 April 1973	Best Music Director	Ghulam Mohammed	Nominated	
Filmfare Awards	21 April 1973	Best Cinematography	Josef Wirsching	Nominated	
Filmfare Awards	21 April 1973	Best Art Direction	N. B. Kulkarni	Won	
1st Shama-Sushma Film Awards	11 March 1973	Best Actress	Meena Kumari	Won	
1st Shama-Sushma Film Awards	11 March 1973	Best Music Director	Ghulam Mohammed	Won	

== Analysis ==
Pakeezah addresses the profession of tawaifs and prostitution and belongs to the Muslim social genre, a Bollywood film category exploring Muslim culture in the usual settings of Lucknow, Lahore, and Delhi that became popular in the 1930s. Films of the genre generally follow the romantic stories of members of a nawab family. In Pakeezah's narrative, Nargis and Sahibjaan present as Lucknow-based tawaifs, in the mold of hooker with a heart of gold, who fall in love with Shahbuddin and Salim, members of nawab families, respectively. Other aspects of Muslim culture, such as dance and costumes, are vital to the plot. According to the academic Sumitra S. Chakravarthy, Pakeezah is a film in which "high drama and spectacle combine with a fine evocation of the niceties" of Muslim culture and Urdu, the language used by most Indian Muslims.

The film's central character is Sahibjaan, and Shahbuddin and Salim appear only in secondary roles, which is uncommon for this type of story. Pakeezah follows society's rejection of prostitution and tawaifs; at the film's beginning, Shahbuddin arrives at his home with Nargis, whom he is preparing to marry. His father rejects Nargis, shouting, "She's not my daughter-in-law. She's your sin." The film also aims to capture Islamic traditions; in the ending, Sahibjaan is revealed by Shahbuddin to be the daughter of Nargis, whom his family rejected. Salim is also part of the family, being the son of Shahbuddin's brother. Sahibjaan and Salim subsequently marry, which her father requests before his death; this is not exceptional for a Muslim marriage—marriage between cousins is legal under Islamic law.

In Pakeezah, sexuality is represented but not directly depicted. Sex scenes are avoided and instead, like other Indian films about tawaifs and prostitution, the film uses dance to emphasise the romance genre. Film analysts have considered the first encounter of Salim and Sahibjaan to be one of the most erotic scenes in the film. Salim and Sahibjaan meet in their respective railway journeys when Sahibjaan is sleeping and Salim enters her compartment and is amazed by her feet, placing a note there saying, "Aapke paon dekhe, bahut haseen hain. Inhein zameen par mat utariyega... maile ho jaayenge" ("I saw your feet. They are really beautiful. Please do not step on the ground... avoid making them dirty"). According to Sulagana Biswas of The Telegraph, writing in 2020, the letter can be dismissed in the 21st century as foot fetishism.

Voiceovers done by Amrohi play a significant role in Pakeezah, which several film analysts found to be his finest work. In the film's opening minutes, voiceover is used to identify Nargis as a courtesan with a "mesmerising voice" and whose tinkling of bells are "a sensation all over", and is the younger sister of the character Nawabjaan. Later in the film, the voiceover describes a man who wants to remove Nargis from her brothel, which is referred to as "this hell", and the black-dressed Shahbuddin then opens the doors. Sound motifs are used throughout the film; for instance, a train whistle represents Sahibjaan's hopes of escaping from her brothel and the alap represents her sadness. A number of symbols, such as a bird with clipped wings and a snake in Sahibjaan's brothel, are used to represent struggles in Kumari's personal life.

== Legacy ==
=== Influence ===
Pakeezah has attained cult status and became a milestone in Bollywood, particularly for its depiction of Muslim culture. The film has been considered one of Amrohi's best works alongside Mahal (1949) and Daaera (1953), and his monument to Kumari. Pakeezah established Amrohi's image as a prominent director. According to Raheja, Amrohi narrates "a story imbued with the despair and the euphoria of human desires so deftly that you are caught up in the swirl of the visual maximalism in the fanciful, almost surreal setting. And by the romanticism of the wish-fulfillment end." Amrohi said the film's success prompted many producers and actors to express their desire to collaborate with him. In 1983, he made an experimental, Muslim-themed biopic titled Razia Sultan, which is about the female Sultan of Delhi of the same name. It was the most-expensive Indian film at the time, but failed to attract an audience and became his last work.

Critics have praised Kumari's performance as one of her career's best, her swan song, and one that made her an "evergreen heroine" of Hindi cinema. Pakeezah was her last release in her lifetime; Gomti Ke Kinare (1972), in which she also stars as a tawaif, was released after her death, though it failed commercially. Scholar Tejaswini Ganti said though she built her persona as a tragic actor in the drama Sahib Bibi Aur Ghulam (1962), the image culminated with her performance in Pakeezah; according to critic Nikhat Kazmi, "It wasn't incidental that Meena Kumari perfected the role of the virginal nautch-girl in Kamal Amrohi's Pakeezah." In 2010, Filmfare included Kumari's work in their list of Bollywood's "80 Iconic Performances", praising her effort to deliver a sensitive performance.

Pakeezah has been noted for its unusually long production time, and is described by critics as the finest example of the Muslim social, a genre that declined in the 1970s with the rise of secular themes in Bollywood. Its sophisticated, lavish costumes and sets have been considered influential. The duo Abu Jani–Sandeep Khosla's design of anarkali, the Indian version of a ball gown, was inspired by Kumari's costumes in Pakeezah; it was shown in their first fashion show in 1988. Costume designer Salim Arif, in the 2003 book Encyclopaedia of Hindi Cinema, wrote Kumari "stood out as the perfect embodiment of the distinctive culture that Muslim socials were set in, with her sophisticated persona heightened manifold by the use of the nuances of the Urdu language, an air of nostalgia for a fading style, refined poetry and music, and exquisite costumes and jewellery". Costume designer Manish Malhotra, who watched Pakeezah's premiere in 1972 as a kid, said the film's costume and set designs are his favourite of any film.

=== Impact ===
Pakeezah has been included in several lists of best films. In 1992, Peter Wollen included in it his list of ten best films of world cinema, placing Pakeezah in the fifth position. In 2005, Rachel Dwyer selected the film for her book 100 Bollywood Films, and Rachna Kanwar of The Times of India included it in her 2005 list of "25 Must See Bollywood Movies". In 2007, it appeared in the British Film Institute's user poll of ten greatest Indian films. The American Indologist Philip Lutgendorf of the University of Iowa, who compiled a list of "Ten Indian Popular Films that are Not-to-be-missed" in 2014, placed Pakeezah in the third position. In 2016, Devesh Sharma from Filmfare included it in his "7 Muslim Socials You Must Watch" list. The newspaper Mint chose Pakeezah in the list of "70 Iconic Films of Indian Cinema" in the next year. The film appeared in the 2018 book 100 Essential Indian Films, compiled by Rohit K. Dasgupta and Sangeeta Datta. In 2020, The Indian Express's Shaikh Ayaz included Pakeezah as one of the "Hindi classics that defined the 1970s". On Eid al-Fitr 2021, Subhash K. Jha of Bollywood Hungama included it in his list of the holiday's must-watches.

The dialogue "Aapke paon dekhe, bahut haseen hain. Inhein zameen par mat utariyega ... maile ho jaayenge" ("I saw your feet. They are really beautiful. Please do not step on the ground ... avoid making them dirty") attained popularity among the audience; India Today and Filmfare gave it a place in their lists of "30 Best Dialogues in Bollywood Movies" (2006) and "20 Most Famous Bollywood Dialogues" (2017), respectively. Actor Madhuri Dixit called Pakeezah her favourite film and filmmaker Sanjay Leela Bhansali said it can make him happy, adding; "We already have Pakeezah. There is no need for another." Writing for Open in 2018, Dwyer said Pakeezah along with Deewaar (1975), Sholay (1975), and films of Bimal Roy and Guru Dutt "could constitute some kind of 'world cinema', where despite their typical features such as the use of melodrama and heightened emotion especially around the family, an engaging narrative, stars, a certain mise en scène, usually one of glamour, grandiloquent dialogues and all-important songs, they can be appraised on similar critical and aesthetic terms".

Pakeezah remained one of the most-talked-about Indian films decades after its release, and many books, including their chapters, and articles have been written about it. In the 1972 biography Meena Kumari, republished in 2013 under the title Meena Kumari: The Classic Biography, Mehta dedicated the fifth chapter to examining the film's production and release, followed by his commentary. Desai wrote the book Pakeezah: An Ode to a Bygone World (2013), providing an inside look at the production, release and thematic analysis. The book attracted positive reviews from critics, who praised his writing and extensive commentary. Biographer Raju Bharatan's Naushadnama, released that year, also contains a chapter about the film's musical composition and background score. Pakeezah is one of ten films whose production and release Padhye covered in her book Ten Classics (2020). In 2021, media reported the National Film Archive of India had obtained 18 minutes of film footage that includes a sequence of the original, black-and-white version of the song "Inhi Logon Ne" with a younger Kumari and different choreography.

== Musical ==
Saad Sheikh of Pakistan adapted the film into a musical dance show in 2022; it was also performed in 2023.

== Re-release ==
After 54 years of the original release of the film, the film is set to release in 4K at Lumière Festival followed by 70th BFI London Film Festival on 18 October 2026. The BFI Film Festival described the film as a great classical musical of Indian cinema, a visually opulent and emotionally tragic film which is a byzantine story of star-crossed lovers. The restoration of the film which was carried out by Film Heritage Foundation took two years to complete. This also included the sound being restored to 5.1

== See also ==
- List of films with the longest production time
- Pakeezah (soundtrack)
