= Pakeezah (soundtrack) =

Soundtrack releases

"Pakeezah Soundtrack"
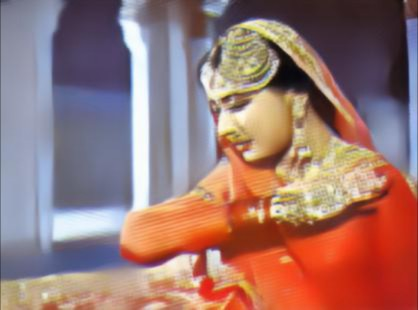
- Meena Kumari performing Chalte Chalte

Song by Lata Mangeshkar, Mohammed Rafi, Rajkumari Dubey, Parveen Sultana, Vani Jairam and Nasim Chopra
- Language: Hindustani (Hindi, Awadhi, Urdu)
- Released: February 4, 1972 (India)
- Length: 42:44
- Label: Saregama
- Composers: Ghulam Mohammad, Naushad
- Lyricists: Kamal Amrohi, Majrooh Sultanpuri, Kaifi Azmi, Kaif Bhopali, Mir Taqi Mir
- Producer: Kamal Amrohi

Music video
- "All songs of Pakeezah" on YouTube

"Pakeezah Rang Barang"

Song by Lata Mangeshkar, Mohammed Rafi, Shamshad Begum, Suman Kalyanpur, Shobha Gurtu and Meena Kumari
- Language: Urdu
- Released: 1977
- Recorded: 1957 – 1960
- Genre: Music of Bollywood
- Length: 39:34
- Label: Saregama
- Composer: Ghulam Mohammad
- Lyricists: Majrooh Sultanpuri, Kaif Bhopali, Kamal Amrohi
- Producer: Kamal Amrohi

Pakeezah is a 1972 film directed by Kamal Amrohi. The film is remembered as one of the most elaborate musicals of Indian Cinema.

== Development ==
Pakeezah was conceptualised in 1954 as a Black & White venture. The mujra Inhin logon ne was shot on July 16, 1956 as written on the reel under Kamal Pictures. The film was eventually released under Kamal Pictures Pvt Ltd in 1972.

It was Mirza Ghalib's music, which paved the path for Ghulam Mohammad to compose for Kamal Amrohi's dream project. After seeing Mirza Ghalib, Kamal Amrohi decided on Ghulam though earlier he had C. Ramchandra in mind, who was on cloud nine after the success of Anarkali.

Majrooh Sultanpuri was supposed to write most of the songs of the film however, in between, he got invitation for a Mushaira and he wanted to attend it. Kamal Amrohi didn't want him to go before completing the song he was working on then but Majrooh told him clearly that poetry and participation in Mushaira were his first preference and he left. Furious Amrohi roped in Kaifi Azmi to complete the song. Ghulam Mohammad composed the music of the film in the late 1950s, to lyrics by several poets, including Kaifi Azmi, Majrooh Sultanpuri and Kaif Bhopali.

The shooting of the film was halted in 1964 due to mutual differences between lead heroine Meena Kumari and her director-husband Amrohi. In 1968, the composer of the film died. So, when the film was revived in 1969, Naushad was roped in to complete the background music for the film. Many exhibitors suggested Kamal Amrohi to change the music according to the then famous trend and style. To this Amrohi said that he would have readily done this if only Ghulam Mohammed was still alive but now he cannot betray a man, who gave him such melodious songs, after his death. So he kept his music intact, but used fewer songs as planned to keep up with the fast changing times.

== Selected songs used in the film ==
=== Inhin Logon Ne ===
Although, Majrooh Sultanpuri and Ghulam Mohammad are credited as the lyricist and composers of the song respectively, this particular lyric is actually a folklore melody. What is even more interesting is that this ‘song’ has been sung and used in many movies before Pakeezah. It was ultimately Pakeezah that popularised the track and became synonymous with Meena Kumari and Pakeezah. Similar versions of this song with minor differences were used in the films Himmat and Aabroo with Shamshad Begum singing in the former and Yakub in the latter. Both of these versions were composed by Pt. Gobind Ram. The song is set in raga Kalyan.

=== Thade Rahiyo ===
Majrooh Sultanpuri is credited as the lyricist of this song. However, in an interview given to Ameen Sayani, Meena Kumari revealed that the opening lines of this song are written by Kamal Amrohi and not Sultanpuri. This song is based on Raga Maand which has its roots to Rajasthan.

=== Chalte Chalte ===
"Chalte Chalte yunhi koi" got its lyrics from Kaifi Azmi. One of the most celebrated songs of the film, it was composed by Ghulam Mohammad who made Ram Narayan, his sarangi master, to give 21 takes for the desired effect. This song was used much later as a reprised version in the 2018 film Mitron and was sung by Atif Aslam.

=== Mausam Hai Aashiqana ===
When the film was resumed in 1969, Mausam Hai Aashiqana was the first song which was shot. But by the time the shooting has resumed, Meena Kumari had lost her beauty due to her addiction to alcohol and had a bloated stomach. Thus, in order to camouflage that, Kamal Amrohi made her wear a comfortable kurta and lungi. This later on became a fashion trend. Based on raga Yaman, simple instrumentation makes this song an easy listen, and Ghulam Mohammed even employs western instruments like the harp and Hawaiian guitar to convey the mood. This song can be heard being played in background in one of the scenes of the film Sarfarosh.

=== Teer-E-Nazar ===
This song comes in the climax of the film. By the time it was recorded, Meena Kumari's condition had worsened to such an extent that while performing, she collapsed. Keeping in mind her medical condition, a body double was brought. Actress Padma Khanna played her body double in this song as she was an adept Kathak dancer which was an urgent requirement of the song. Meena Kumari personally trained her for the scene, and the song was filmed with the majority of the dancing done under a veil in order to hide her face.

=== Najariya Ki Maari ===
The song was composed by Naushad. During the production of the film, Naushad found Rajkumari, one of the first female playback singers of India, singing in the chorus to make her ends meet. Deeply pained, Naushad gave an entire song to her as a mark of respect. In the film, the song plays in the background when the protagonist goes to meet her ill friend. This song was reused in the Netflix series Heeramandi. This version was sung by Madhubanti Bagchi and performed by actress Sanjeeda Sheikh onscreen.

== Selected songs from Pakeezah Rang Barang ==
Ghulam Mohammed composed a total of 15 songs for the film out of which only six were used. The nine other songs had not been used in the film and as a token of good faith to the composer, Kamal Amrohi compiled these tracks and had them released by His Master's Voice as ‘Pakeezah Rang Barang’; an enchanting assortment of Thumri, Ghazal, Qawwali and Mujra fills the brim of this musical odyssey. This album was released exclusively by HMV in 1977.

=== Yeh Kiski Aankhon Ka ===
Mohammed Rafi rendered his voice to the words of Majrooh Sultanpuri. Composed prominently in Raga Yaman, this melody was created by using instruments like Sitar, Harmonica, Guitar and even flute.

=== Hatkar Tere Kadmon Se ===
A qawwali is a regular feature of Muslim social films. This qawwali gets its lyrics from Kaif Bhopali. Shamshad Begum and Mohammed Rafi lend their voices to this song.

=== Leke Angrai ===
Meena Kumari recited the introductory couplet of this song. Sung by Suman Kalyanpur, this song got its lyrics from Kaif Bhopali. Instruments such as tabla, sarangi and sitar are used in this song.

=== Chalo Dildaar Chalo (Version 2) ===
Chalo Dildaar Chalo which was used as a romantic duet in the film, was also sung solo by Lata Mangeshkar. Made from fast-paced Raga Pahadi, the song was written by Kaif Bhopali and released in 1977.

== Soundtrack ==
Pakeezah

Soundtrack album by Ghulam Mohammed & Naushad Ali
- Released: 1972 (India)
- Genre: Feature film soundtrack
- Length: 42:44
- Label: Saregama

Ghulam Mohammed chronology
Shama (1961)	Pakeezah (1972)

Naushad Ali chronology
Gunwaar (1970)	Pakeezah (1972)	Tangewala (1972)

Pakeezah Rang Barang

Soundtrack album by Ghulam Mohammed
- Released: 1977 (India)
- Genre: Album soundtrack
- Length: 39:34
- Label: Saregama

Soundtrack
Review scores
Source	Rating
Planet Bollywood	link

The soundtrack for the film was composed by Ghulam and Naushad, with lyrics by Kaifi Azmi, Majrooh Sultanpuri, Kamal Amrohi, and Kaif Bhopali. There were a total of 20 songs recorded, however, only eleven of them were used in the film. The other nine songs were later released in Pakeezah Rang Barang in 1977. Two songs- Inhin Logon Ne and Chalte Chalte of the film finished at #2 & #3 respectively at the Binaca Geetmala of the year 1972.

	S.No.	Song	Raga	Singer(s)	Lyrics	Composer	Duration
Pakeezah (42:44)	1	Theme	Mishra Pilu	Lata Mangeshkar	-	Naushad	4:15
Pakeezah (42:44)	2	Mora Saajan	Pahadi	Vani Jairam		Naushad	2:29
Pakeezah (42:44)	3	Inhin Logon Ne	Yaman Kalyan	Lata Mangeshkar	Majrooh Sultanpuri	Ghulam Mohammad	3:41
Pakeezah (42:44)	4	Kaun Gali Gayo	Mishra Khamaj	Parveen Sultana	Kaifi Azmi	Naushad	2:41
Pakeezah (42:44)	5	Najariya Ki Maari	Khamaj	Rajkumari Dubey	Traditional	Naushad	2:18
Pakeezah (42:44)	6	Thade Rahiyo	Mand	Lata Mangeshkar	Kamal Amrohi, Majrooh Sultanpuri	Ghulam Mohammad	5:53
Pakeezah (42:44)	7	Chalte Chalte	Bhup Kalyan	Lata Mangeshkar	Kaifi Azmi	Ghulam Mohammad	5:53
Pakeezah (42:44)	8	Mausam Hai Aahiqana	Yaman	Lata Mangeshkar	Kamal Amrohi	Ghulam Mohammad	4:53
Pakeezah (42:44)	9	Chalo Dildaar Chalo	Pahadi	Mohammed Rafi, Lata Mangeshkar	Kaif Bhopali	Ghulam Mohammad	3:37
Pakeezah (42:44)	10	Teer E Nazar	Khamaj	Lata Mangeshkar	Kaif Bhopali	Ghulam Mohammad	3:59
Pakeezah (42:44)	11	Ye Dhuaan Sa		Naseem Chopra	Mir Taqi Mir	Ghulam Mohammad	3:05
Pakeezah Rang Barang (39:34)	12	Leke Angrai		Meena Kumari, Suman Kalyanpur	Kaif Bhopali	Ghulam Mohammed	5:09
Pakeezah Rang Barang (39:34)	13	Kothe Se Bada		Shamshad Begum	Kaif Bhopali	Ghulam Mohammed	3:25
Pakeezah Rang Barang (39:34)	14	Hatkar Tere Qadmon Se		Mohammad Rafi, Shamshad Begum & Chorus	Kaif Bhopali	Ghulam Mohammed	5:01
Pakeezah Rang Barang (39:34)	15	Pyaare Babul		Lata Mangeshkar & Chorus	Kaif Bhopali	Ghulam Mohammed	4:37
Pakeezah Rang Barang (39:34)	16	Chalo Dildar Chalo	Pahadi	Lata Mangeshkar	Kaif Bhopali	Ghulam Mohammed	3:47
Pakeezah Rang Barang (39:34)	17	Tanhai Sunaya Karti Hai	Mand	Lata Mangeshkar	Kamal Amrohi	Ghulam Mohammed	3:36
Pakeezah Rang Barang (39:34)	18	Pee Ke Chale		Lata Mangeshkar	Majrooh Sultanpuri	Ghulam Mohammed	4:19
Pakeezah Rang Barang (39:34)	19	Yeh Kiski Aankhon Ka	Yaman	Mohammad Rafi	Majrooh Sultanpuri	Ghulam Mohammed	5:21
Pakeezah Rang Barang (39:34)	20	Bandhan Bandho	Bhoopali	Shobha Gurtu		Ghulam Mohammed	4:19
Total Length (42:44) + (39:34) = 82:18

== See also ==
- Pakeezah
- Hindi dance songs
- Ghulam Mohammad
