= Pakeezah (disambiguation) =

Pakeezah is a 1972 Indian film directed by Kamal Amrohi.

Pakeezah or Pakeeza may also refer to:

- Pakeezah (soundtrack), soundtrack of the 1972 film by Naushad and Ghulam Mohammed
- Pakeeza (album), a 2013 Hindi album by Indian singer Zubeen Garg
- Pakeezah (TV series), a 2016 Pakistani television drama series
- Pakeeza (1979 film), a Pakistani film
