= Meena Kumari (book) =

Biography by Vinod Mehta

- Cover of the 1972 edition
- Author: Vinod Mehta
- Language: English
- Subject: Meena Kumari
- Published: October 1972
- Publisher: Jaico Publishing House
- Publication place: India
- Media type: Print
- Pages: 187
- OCLC: 586134668

Meena Kumari is a biography by Vinod Mehta about the Indian actress of the same name. It details her birth in 1933 in Bombay (present-day Mumbai), her 33-year-long acting career, her marriage to Kamal Amrohi, and her death in 1972. It also includes Mehta's analysis on her career and film roles. The first edition published in October 1972 by Jaico Publishing House was praised by critics, but its second edition, Meena Kumari: The Classic Biography, released on 10 July 2013 by HarperCollins, met with mixed criticism.

Luiz Vaz of Jaico Publishing House approached Mehta, then a copywriter, to write a biography on Kumari soon after her death in March 1972. Though unfamiliar with Bollywood, Mehta took the opportunity to expand his scope of work. In research, he met her family members and contemporaries, and also collected archived film magazines. His writing style is influenced by New Journalism, where the authors are placed as the narrative's core and refer to themselves with first-person pronouns.

== Summary ==
Meena Kumari opens with a foreword by the author, Vinod Mehta, on its development. The book is divided into two sections: the first contains six chapters—"Lies", "Birth", "Rise", "Fall", "Pakeezah", and "Death"—and the second, titled "Personal Appraisal", contains three chapters: "How I Got to Know Her", "The Actress", and "The Woman".

The book starts with brief coverage about Meena Kumari's death on 31 March 1972 and the reactions of her contemporaries and the press. It later chronicles Kumari's birth in Bombay (present-day Mumbai) on 1 August 1932, though Mehta wrote a note clarifying that there are some sources that said the year was 1933. She was born into a Muslim family, and had two sisters (Khursheed and Mahliqa). Her father, Master Ali Bux, was an Urdu-language writer and her mother, Iqbal Begum, was a silent film actress and stage dancer. She made her debut with Leather Face (1939) as a child artist, but her first starring role was in Bachchon Ka Khel (1946). Kumari won the Filmfare Award for Best Actress for her work in Baiju Bawra (1952), and later that year she married Kamal Amrohi on 14 February.

Kumari subsequently starred in more commercially and critically successful films, including Parineeta (1953), Chandni Chowk (1954), Azaad (1955), Sharada (1957), Miss Mary (1957), Chirag Kahan Roshni Kahan (1959), Kohinoor (1960), and Dil Apna Aur Preet Parai (1960). Her performance as a desperate wife in the 1962 romantic drama Sahib Bibi Aur Ghulam is regarded by critics as one of her career's bests, though the film failed at the box office. Following her separation from Amrohi in 1964, she became an alcoholic and led her to suffer from cirrhosis. Mehta dedicated one of the book's chapters for the final film released during her lifetime, Pakeezah (1972). Produced within fourteen years, making it one of the films with the longest production times, the film opened to average reception commercially but its revenue rapidly increased after her death.

The last three chapters in the second section are about the writing of the book and Mehta's analysis on Kumari's career and film roles.

== Development and writing ==
Mehta was working as a copywriter for the advertisement agency Jaisons that was run by Harsh Jain and his four sons, when Luis Vaz of Jaico Publishing House approached Mehta to offer him writing a biography on Kumari as soon as she died in March 1972. He had previously written Bombay: A Private View, about his experiences in Bombay during the 1970s and earlier decades. The book, finished in under eight months at his apartment, was self-published and distributed by Thacker and Company. The book costed ₹5 (equivalent to ₹250 or US$2.50 in 2026) and became a commercial success. All 3,000 copies of the first edition were sold out after six days. Although he continued to work as a copywriter, the book's success gave him motivation to write more books in the future.

Mehta subsequently accepted Vaz's offers, with ₹500 (equivalent to ₹25,000 or US$250 in 2026) as his advance. He took the opportunity to broaden the scope of his work, though he almost had no insights about Bollywood at the time nor met the actress. It was not an easy task for him to collect information about Kumari since she had died when he started writing the biography. Within six months, Mehta finished the manuscript with interviews with her sisters, her husband, and her contemporaries. Mehta planned to meet the actor Dharmendra multiple times, which never happened; he later expressed his disappointment, calling his inability to meet Dharmendra a "void" in Meena Kumari. The writer also collected information from available magazine copies, including those for Filmfare, Filmindia, and Screen.

The book emulates the writing style of several writers—often called New Journalism—including Norman Mailer in The Armies of the Night (1968). The author is placed inside the narrative, and the use of the pronoun I is common. In Meena Kumari, Kumari is generally referred to by Mehta as "my heroine". He said, though still journalistic, the style is author-centric and personalized. He added that he copied their idea, asserting that, since he was a new writer that time, he had not many of his own. He added: "All the solecisms and structural weakness were cringingly visible, but ... it was not as bad as I thought. My self-created proximity to the subject posed an obvious and clear danger. Nevertheless, despite the naivety and exhibitionism and hurried judgements, I thought I had managed to capture some fleeting essence of the controversial actress."

== Release and reception ==
By October 1972, seven months after Kumari's death, Mehta had finished the book's manuscript and sent it to Jaico Publishing House. It was published as a paperback book that costed ₹5 (equivalent to ₹250 or US$2.50 in 2026) the same month in Bombay, India. Abbas, whom Mehta interviewed for his research, wrote a positive review of the book for the weekly tabloid Blitz in December. Abbas called it "the most objective, the most sympathetic, the most comprehensively researched, and the most readable book" on Kumari. He complimented Mehta's effort to write the biography, and praised him for his ability to write on her explicitly with "restrained and civilised language".

The book's second edition was published by HarperCollins on 10 July 2013 on Amazon Kindle; the paperback version was released on 13 August the same year. Re-titled Meena Kumari: The Classic Biography, this edition has another foreword from Mehta dated May 2013. Prior to HarperCollins, many publishers had approached him to re-publish the book, but he rejected their offers, as he believed it does not "[merit] the honour"; he later described the book as a part of his "mediocre past". While its original edition was acclaimed by book reviewers, critical reception to Meena Kumari: The Classic Biography was mixed. Jai Arjun Singh noted it has many grammatical mistakes, and Rasheeda Bhagat of Business Line added: "... a poor caricature of the actress whom Mehta keeps calling, to my great irritation, 'my heroine', through the entire book. What somewhat redeems this atrocious narrative, in which he largely appears cocky at best and flippant and ignorant at worst, is the shy at honesty in the introduction to the new edition."

Mumbai Mirror's Chandrima Pal believed it "is as relevant today as it was at that time". Baradwaj Rangan thought Mehta's writing made the book look more like an autobiography rather than a biography on Kumari. Ziya Us Salam praised Mehta for "[bringing] alive memories of an actress and her illustrious career". The Hindu called it a "riveting account" about Kumari. Frontline concluded it would need talent equal to Billy Wilder's to write a book on her, and the book "suggested a possibility of how it might be done". Utpal Kumar from The Pioneer asserted, "So far so good, but the book is not a biography in the true sense, far from being a 'classic' biography. It's a pacy, juicy and engaging account of the country's greatest tragedienne and her marriage and affairs." Biswadeep Ghosh from India Today believed "reading this biography will be a fulfilling experience".

== Publication history ==
Publication history of Meena Kumari
Region	Release date	Format	Publisher	Ref.
India	October 1972	Paperback	Jaico Publishing House	
India	10 July 2013	Amazon Kindle	HarperCollins	
India	13 August 2013	Paperback	HarperCollins	

== Sources ==
- Abbas, Khwaja Ahmad (December 1972). "Meena Kumari by Vinod Mehta". Indian Book Industry. Vol. 7, no. 3.
- Bhagat, Rasheeda (17 October 2013). "Finding Meena... and failing". Business Line. Archived from the original on 9 July 2021.
- Ghosh, Biswadeep (28 July 2013). "An ode to tragedy queen Meena Kumari". India Today. Archived from the original on 3 September 2021.
- Kumar, Utpal (18 August 2013). "Starry life, tragic tale". The Pioneer. Archived from the original on 3 September 2021.
- Mehta, Vinod (9 November 2011). Lucknow Boy. New Delhi, India: Penguin Books. ISBN 978-0-670-08529-3. OCLC 783522585.
- Mehta, Vinod (10 July 2013). Meena Kumari. HarperCollins. ASIN B00E9Y3RX0.
- Mehta, Vinod (13 August 2013). Meena Kumari. HarperCollins. ISBN 978-93-50296-25-7.
- Pal, Chandrima (15 August 2013). "Men who loved and left Meena Kumari". Mumbai Mirror. Archived from the original on 22 October 2020.
- "Printpick". The Hindu. Thiruvananthapuram, India. 28 August 2013. Archived from the original on 31 August 2013.
- Rangan, Baradwaj (3 December 2013). "An admirer's account of Meena Kumari". The Hindu. Archived from the original on 27 February 2021.
- Salam, Ziya Us (16 August 2013). "After Mahjabeen turned Meena". The Hindu. Archived from the original on 10 February 2014.
- Singh, Jai Arjun (14 August 2013). "Death and the heroine: Vinod Mehta does Meena Kumari". Jabberwock. Archived from the original on 12 June 2021.
- "Two legends". Frontline. 15 November 2013. Archived from the original on 21 January 2021.
