= Naushadnama =

Biography by Raju Bharatan

- Author: Raju Bharatan
- Language: English
- Subject: Naushad
- Genre: Biography
- Published: 2013
- Publisher: Hay House
- Publication place: India
- Media type: Print
- Pages: 356
- ISBN: 978-93-81431-93-1
- OCLC: 861739511

Naushadnama is a 2013 biography of the Indian composer Naushad by the journalist and critic Raju Bharatan. Consisting of 21 chapters, the book predominantly focuses on Naushad's musical career from his debut in 1940 with Prem Nagar, his rise to stardom, up to his final release Taj Mahal: An Eternal Love Story (2005). It also slightly covers his personal life, such as his birth on the Christmas day of 1919, his two-time marriages, and his death due to cardiac arrest in 2006.

Bharatan got to know Naushad in 1949 and, after their first meeting in Bandra six year later, developed an interest on the composer's work. Although Naushad had asked Bharatan to write a biography on him during his lifetime, the writing, however, was started only after his death. Naushadnama was met with varied reviews from critics, who praised the book's comprehensiveness but criticised it for giving an extra focus on Naushad's career rather than his personal life.

== Summary ==
Naushadnama is a biography of the Indian music director Naushad, primarily focuses on his career and divided into 21 chapters. He was born into a conservative Lucknow-based Muslim family on 25 December 1919, married two times, had nine children (three sons and six daughters), and died on 5 May 2006 by cardiac arrest. Naushad began his debut with the 1940 film Prem Nagar, and composed soundtrack to several commercially and critically successful films, including Baiju Bawra (1952), Mother India (1957, the first Indian film nominated at the Academy Awards), Mughal-e-Azam (1960, one of India's highest-grossing films of all time), Gunga Jumna (1961), Ram Aur Shyam (1967), and Pakeezah (1972).

== Development and writing ==
Raju Bharatan was a magazine editor, journalist, columnist, and historian who focused on cricket and Bollywood music. He first knew Naushad in 1949, but it was only in end-1955 that he met him at his studio in Bandra. He described the visits as his pivotal experience, helping him to know more about the Indian classical music. Writing for the book's foreword, Bharatan admitted that Naushad caught his attention to the type of music, and added, "Soon I divined that, without ever saying so, Naushad had begun making my music listening classically oriented. In this sense, he was my mentor. The fact that, even before we embarked upon such a journey, he was my favourite music director helped."

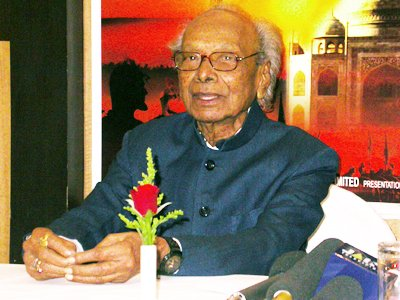
Naushad asked Bharatan to write him a biography before his death in 2006

"For Naushad was something more than his music. His personality presented a study in career management. He worked like a beaver to sustain the status that he had attained as the number one music director in our films. Such a meteoric rise had to be backed by solid all-round effort to stay at the summit. Here Naushad never once relaxed his grip. He worked with the same assiduity on his career as he did on his music."

— Raju Bharatan on Naushad

Naushad had asked Bharatan to write him a biography, but the request was fulfilled only after his death. According to Bharatan, it took him 50 years since their first meeting in Bandra "to fathom the full strength of his music". His motivation of writing the book is to surpass anything that had been written on the composer. For his research, Bharatan was helped by the historian Harish Raghuwanshi, whom Bharatan described as "close to being the best film historian in India today". Bharatan's book more focuses on Naushad's work rather than his personal life, but he claimed in its foreword that there is "not a single facet of Naushad’s life and times have I left unexplored".

== Critical reception ==
Naushadnama generated mixed reviews from literary critics. Writing for The Hindu, M. O. Badsha wrote that the book is full of anecdotes of Naushad's life and added that it deserves to be praised. The critic of Indo-Asian News Service complimented the book's "comprehensive and enthralling narrative—studded with rare nuggets of information", saying, "This volume, by one of India's greatest film critics, also throws light on the relations and interactions between him and his singers; his songwriters, and his unsung instrumentalists. The author draws upon his vast and varied experience to come up with a revelatory work which will evoke a medley of memories." Suresh Kohli, who reviewed Naushadnama for The Tribune, referred to it as "a mine full of authentic redeemed nostalgia: Carefully catalogued, nurtured and memorised."

In the Hindustan Times, Narendra Kusnur criticised the book for lacking information of Naushad's personal life, but commended its inside look at his musical career. "Tales like these make Naushadnama a must for fans of old music. Though the excessive detail may get taxing for those less familiar with his work, the hardcore fan will find plenty to pick up. Bharatan's analysis and depth, and the trivia, make this an extremely readable book", Kusnur concluded. Shreekant Sambrani of Business Standard found the book to be dull and panned Bharatan's "meandering and murderous" writing style. The critic from Frontline called it "a mine of information not only on the great Naushad but also on his professional colleagues and their respective attitudes towards him and each other in an environment as susceptible to gossip as it was conducive to the making of memorable film songs".

== Sources ==
- Badsha, M. O. (31 October 2013). "Two legends, one passion". The Hindu. Archived from the original on 4 November 2013.
- Bharatan, Raju (2013). Naushadnama: The Life and Music of Naushad. New Delhi, India: Hay House. ISBN 978-93-81431-93-1.
- "Book rack". Deccan Herald. 21 September 2013. Archived from the original on 19 January 2022.
- Indo-Asian News Service (28 September 2013). "Spicing up the weekend with Bollywood (IANS Books This Week)". Firstpost. Archived from the original on 19 January 2022.
- Kohli, Suresh (23 February 2014). "Musical journey". The Tribune. Archived from the original on 26 July 2021.
- Kusnur, Narendra (14 November 2013). "Naushadnama: A must-read for fans of classic Hindi film music". Hindustan Times. Archived from the original on 21 June 2019.
- Sambrani, Shreekant (13 September 2013). "Killjoy of odes". Business Standard. Archived from the original on 19 January 2022.
- "Two legends". Frontline. 15 November 2013. Archived from the original on 21 January 2021.
