= Kahan Shuru Kahan Khatam =

2024 Indian film by Saurabh Dasgupta

- Theatrical release poster
- Directed by: Saurabh Dasgupta
- Written by: Laxman Utekar; Rishi Virmani
- Produced by: Vinod Bhanushali; Laxman Utekar; Karishma Sharma; Kamlesh Bhanushali
- Starring: Dhvani Bhanushali; Aashim Gulati
- Cinematography: Sanket Shah
- Edited by: Manish Pradhan
- Music by: S. D. Burman; Shankar–Jaikishan; Sachin–Jigar; Sunny M.R. Akshay & IP; Sandeep Shirodkar
- Production companies: Bhanushali Studios Limited; Kathputli Creations
- Distributed by: Pen Marudhar
- Release date: 20 September 2024
- Running time: 104 minutes
- Country: India
- Language: Hindi

Kahan Shuru Kahan Khatam (transl. Where does it begin, where does it end?) is a 2024 Indian Hindi-language romantic comedy film, written by Laxman Utekar and Rishi Virmani, and directed by Saurabh Dasgupta. The film stars Dhvani Bhanushali and Aashim Gulati in the lead roles. It marks Bhanushali's debut in Bollywood, following her successful career in the music industry. The film is produced by Vinod Bhanushali’s Bhanushali Studios Limited and Kathputli Creations, with Saregama as the music label. The film was released in theatres on 20 September 2024.

== Synopsis ==
The film explores the young romantic family entertainer genre with a focus on an accidental love story. The film is a wedding crasher's tale of falling in love with the bride and an innocent message to take away.

== Cast ==
- Dhvani Bhanushali as Meera Chaudhary
- Aashim Gulati as Krishna "Krish" Sharma
- Rajesh Sharma as Sumer Singh Chaudhary
- Rakesh Bedi as Pandit, Krish's father
- Supriya Pilgaonkar as Panditaain, Krish's mother
- Sonali Sachdev as Meera's mother
- Akhilendra Mishra as Tauji
- Chittaranjan Tripathy as Chachaji
- Vikram Kochhar as Gautam
- Himashu Kohli as Gambhir
- Vikas Verma as Baby Singh
- Gaurav Manwane as Nick, Krish's roommate
- Shubham Choudhary as Ron, Krish's roommate
- Dhanashree Verma as Herself (special appearance in song "Babu Ki Baby")

== Production ==
In March 2022, news came out that Dhvani Bhanushali is going to debut in Bollywood as an actress after singing.

== Music ==
Kahan Shuru Kahan Khatam

Soundtrack album by S. D. Burman, Shankar–Jaikishan, Sachin–Jigar, Sunny M.R., Akshay & IP and Sandeep Shirodkar
- Released: 13 September 2024
- Genre: Feature film soundtrack
- Length: 21:03
- Language: Hindi
- Label: Saregama

Official audio
- Kahan Shuru Kahan Khatam (Audio Jukebox) on YouTube

The music of the film is composed by S. D. Burman, Shankar–Jaikishan, Sachin–Jigar, Sunny M.R., Akshay & IP and Sandeep Shirodkar. Lyrics is written by Kausar Munir, Shailendra, IP Singh, Ashish Pandit, Majrooh Sultanpuri and Kumaar, with the songs choreographed by Vijay Ganguly and Jayesh Pradhan.

The song "Kahan Shuru Kahan Khatam - Title Track," is recreated for the film from the song "Ajeeb Dastan Hai Yeh" from the 1960 film Dil Apna Aur Preet Parai, originally sung by Lata Mangeshkar. The song "Ek Ladki Bheegi Bhagi Si" sung by Kishore Kumar from the 1958 film Chalti Ka Naam Gaadi is also recreated for the film.

Track listing
No.	Title	Lyrics	Music	Singer(s)	Length
1.	"Sehra"	Kausar Munir	Sachin–Jigar	Dhvani Bhanushali, Sachin-Jigar, Varun Jain	3:00
2.	"Kahan Shuru Kahan Khatam - Title Track"	Shailendra, IP Singh	Akshay & IP, Shankar–Jaikishan	Dhvani Bhanushali, Vismay Patel, Lata Mangeshkar	2:56
3.	"Ishq De Shot"	IP Singh	Akshay & IP	Dhvani Bhanushali, IP Singh	2:45
4.	"Babu Ki Baby"	Ashish Pandit	Sunny M.R.	Sunidhi Chauhan	3:29
5.	"Sehra" (Dhvani Bhanushali Version)	Kausar Munir	Sachin–Jigar	Dhvani Bhanushali	3:00
6.	"Ek Ladki Bheegi Bhagi Si"	IP Singh, Majrooh Sultanpuri	S. D. Burman, Akshay & IP	Shashwat Singh, IP Singh, Kishore Kumar	2:57
7.	"Rang Udaye"	Kumaar	Sandeep Shirodkar	Varun Jain, Asees Kaur	2:56
Total length:					21:03

== Release ==
=== Theatrical ===
The trailer of the film was released on 23 August 2024. The film released on 20 September 2024.

== Reception ==
Deepa Gahlot of Rediff.com gave the film 2/5 stars and notes "Kahan Shuru Kahan Khatam, with its retro-inspired title song and background score just tries too hard, both with the comedy and the message."
