= Aayega Aanewala =

Song by Khemchand Prakash, performed by Lata Mangeshkar

Song by Lata Mangeshkar

from the album Mahal
- Language: Hindi
- Released: 19 October 1949
- Genre: Filmi
- Length: 6:52
- Label: Saregama
- Songwriter: Nakshab Jaaravchi
- Producer: Bombay Talkies

Music video
- "Aayega Aanewala" on YouTube

"Aayega Aanewala" (English: He'll come, who has to come) is one of the most well known songs from Indian cinema. It was prominent in the film Mahal, starring Ashok Kumar and Madhubala, being sung by Lata Mangeshkar. Khemchand Prakash composed the music, while Nakshab Jaaravchi wrote the lyrics. It has been described as "one most effective song picturization of yesteryears".
