= Josef Wirsching =

German cinematographer

- Born: 22 March 1903; Munich, German Empire (present-day Germany)
- Died: 11 June 1967 (aged 64); Bombay, India
- Occupations: cinematographer, film director
- Known for: Mahal (1949), Pakeezah (1972)

Josef Wirsching (22 March 1903 – 11 June 1967) sometimes credited as Joseph Wirsching, was a German cinematographer, who became a pioneer in cinematography in India and who contributed to the heritage of Cinema of India and still photography in its improvement into a scientific art of expression. His association with Indian cinema started in 1925, when he worked with another German, Franz Osten, in the Indo-European collaboration, The Light of Asia. Thereafter he settled in India, went on to work in over 20 films with Bombay Talkies and subsequently with Kamal Amrohi in Mahal (1949), Dil Apna Aur Preet Parayi (1960) and his masterpiece Pakeezah (1972), though he died while it was still under production.

== Early life and education ==
Born in Munich, Germany, where he also did his schooling. After his schooling he joined ‘Blau Weiβ Films’ in Munich as an apprentice photographer; he studied photography theory in the state run ‘Gewerbeschule’ in Munich.

== Personal life ==
He married Charlotte Mϋllberger in Germany on 28 January 1929. Their only son, Wolfgang Peter Wirsching was born in Bombay, India in 1939.

He died in Bombay on 11 June 1967, after a massive cardiac arrest. His photographic collection is now maintained by grandson Georg Wirsching.

== Career ==
In 1923, he joined ‘Emelka Film Studios’ (present day ‘Bavaria Films’) as an assistant cameraman cum laboratory assistant and was later promoted to Film Cameraman in a short span of time and was involved as an assistant/cameraman for the following films:

- Prem Sanyas (The Light of Asia, 1925)
- Das Grabmal einer groβen Liebe (1926)
- Our Emden (1926)
- Little Inge and Her Three Fathers (1926)
- My Heidelberg, I Can Not Forget You (1927)
- Travelogue of overland trip from Mϋnich to Benares (1927/28)
- Travelogue of overland trip from Calcutta to Rangoon (1928)
- Waterloo (1928)
- Spuren im Schnee (1928)
- Cruiser Emden (1932)
- Stoβtrupp 1917 (1933/34)
- Im Lande des Silbernen Löwen (1933)
- The Love Hotel (1933)

=== Bombay Talkies ===
After Emelka he joined Bombay Talkies in Bombay, India, as a director of Photography in 1935.

==== Bombay Talkies productions (before Second World War) ====
- Jawani Ki Hawa (1935)
- Level Crossing (1936)
- Mother-Always Tell Your Wife (1936)
- Achut Kanya (1936)
- Janmabhoomi. (1936)
- Jeevan Naiya (1936)
- Izzat (1937)
- Prem Kahani (1937)
- Miyan Biwi (1937)
- Savitri (1937)
- Jeevan Prabhat (1937)
- Nirmala (1938)
- Vachan (1938)
- Mamta/Bhabi (1938)
- Nav Jeevan (1939)
- Kangan (1939)
- Durga (1939)

As he was a German national living in the British India, In 1939 he was interned for the period of World War II in an internment camp for foreign nationals, firstly in Ahmednagar, then Dehradun and finally Satara. He was ultimately released from internment in 1947 after which he returned to ‘Bombay Talkies’ which by now had changed ownership.

==== Bombay Talkies productions (after Second World War) ====
- Ziddi (1948)
- Mahal (1949)
- Sangram (1950)
- Maa (1952)
- Samsheer (1953)
- Baadbaan (1954) {This was a ‘Bombay Talkies’ workers cooperative effort to keep the studio alive}.

=== AMA Limited ===
Before ‘Bombay Talkies’ closed down in 1954; he joined ‘AMA Limited’ in their documentary & ad-film division in 1954, where he photographed, co-photographed and partially directed a few of their productions in both color and black n white:

Black and white

- Young Farmers Club
- River Valley Projects, (Documentary on the Bakra Nangal Dam)
- Fishing for Food
- Malaria Control
- One Thousand hands
- How to grow more Paddy pest control
- Education for Life
- First Furrow
- The Mould Board Plough
- Practical seed drills
- The Row cultivator
- Time is Money
- Improved Seed
- Our Indian Earth
- Care of the Eyes
- Kora Kendra
- How to have a healthy home (Northern region)
- How to have a healthy home (Southern region)
- How to have a healthy home (Eastern region)
- Village Black Smith-ing
- Village Carpentry
- Black Smith-ing in small towns
- Rehabilitation in Polio Mellitus

Color

- Fertilizer Applications
- Fertilizer for Abundance
- Life of the soil
- The Story of Trombay (A Documentary on the TATA Thermal power project in Trombay)

=== Mahal Pictures ===
After his stint in Bombay Talkies he joined Kamal Amrohi's Mahal Pictures as director of Photography in 1959 and did two films namely Dil Apna Aur Preet Parai (1960) and Pakeezah (1972), his only colour film. This film was completed in part after his demise in 1967 and was released in 1972. The remaining scenes which were shot after his demise are clearly noticeable. The famous Paan gali scene is credited to him. He even shows up on screen as a large bearded man in the crowd in the film.
