= Kaif Bhopali =

Poet and lyricist (1917 - 1991)

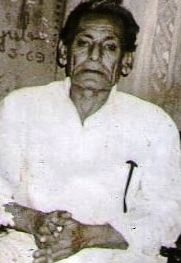
- Born: Khwaja Mohammad Idris; 20 February 1917; Bhopal State, British India
- Died: 24 July 1991 (aged 74); Bhopal, Madhya Pradesh, India
- Occupations: Film songs lyricist, poet
- Writing career
- Genres: Ghazal, Urdu poetry
- Subjects: Love, philosophy

Kaif Bhopali (20 February 1917 – 24 July 1991) was an Indian Urdu poet and lyricist. He was a poet in the Urdu mushaira circles, and is known as the writer of songs like Chalo Dildar Chalo, sung by Mohammed Rafi in Kamal Amrohi's 1972 classic, Pakeezah.

== Career ==
Kaif Bhopali was born Khwaja Mohammad Idris in Bhopal State, British India, now in Madhya Pradesh, India. Kaif Bhoopali wrote lyrics for many Bollywood films like Pakeezah (1972), where he wrote songs like Teer-E-Nazar and Chalo dildar chalo chand ke paar chalo.

He also wrote some ghazals like "तेरा चेहरा कितना सुहाना लगता है", Jhoom ke jab rindon ne pila dee, sung by Jagjit Singh. One of his couplets is Kaun aayega yehan, koyi na aaya hoga, also sung by Jagjit Singh.He is also writer of famous ghazal " terā chehra kitnā suhānā lagtā hai" also sung by Jagit Singh.

Another song was Aye Khuda Shukr Tera in the 1983 film Razia Sultan, written and directed by Kamal Amrohi and Apne aap raaton mein, sung by Lata Mangeshkar is a gem from 1977 film Shankar Hussain.

Kaif Bhopali's daughter, Parveen Kaif, is a poet who participates in mushairas.

== Filmography ==
- Daaera (1953)
- Pakeezah (1972)
- Shankar Hussain (1977)
- Raziya Sultan (1983)
