= Ajeeb Dastan Hai Yeh (song) =

Indian Hindi song by Lata Mangeshkar

Song by Lata Mangeshkar

from the album Dil Apna Aur Preet Parai
- Language: Hindi
- Released: 1960
- Length: 5:15
- Label: Saregama
- Songwriter: Shailendra
- Producer: Shankar–Jaikishan

"Ajeeb Dastan Hai Yeh" (transl. This Is Strange Story) is a Hindi song from the 1960 Indian romantic film Dil Apna Aur Preet Parai, directed by Kishore Sahu and starting Raaj Kumar, Meena Kumari and Nadira in lead roles. The song, penned by Shailendra, composed by Shankar–Jaikishan and sung by Lata Mangeshkar, is placed at number 4 in the list of 100 greatest Bollywood songs of all time by BBC Asian Network. This song portrays the emotional tension between two characters, hinting at the complex relationships and unspoken feelings that drive the story.

== Description ==
The Hawaiian-themed song "Ajeeb Dastan Hai Yeh" was adapted from the 1956 hit "My Lips Are Sealed" by Jim Reeves.

"Ajeeb Dastan Hai Yeh" composed by Shankar–Jaikishan won the Best Music Director award at the 1961 Filmfare Awards, unexpectedly surpassing the widely acclaimed soundtrack of Mughal-e-Azam composed by Naushad.

== In popular culture ==
The song remains one of the hits of Lata Mangeshkar and widely celebrated tracks from golden era of Hindi cinema and continues to be played on television, radio, and live performances as a tribute to her legacy.

The title of the TV show Ajeeb Daastaan Hai Ye is inspired by the song of the same name.

The song Kahan Shuru Kahan Khatam, the title track of 2024 Indian film of same name, is a re-creation of the song Ajeeb Dastan Hai Yeh.

== See also ==
- List of songs recorded by Lata Mangeshkar
