= Shankar Hussain =

- Directed by: Yusuf Naqvi as Yusuf Nakvee
- Written by: Kamal Amrohi (Story, Dialogue & Screenplay)
- Produced by: Tajdar Kamal and Hari Singhaney
- Starring: Pradeep Kumar; Kanwaljit Singh
- Edited by: D N Pai
- Music by: Khayyam; Lyrics: Jan Nisar Akhtar, Kaif Bhopali, Kaifi Azmi and Kamal Amrohi
- Release date: 1977
- Running time: 133 mins
- Country: India
- Language: Hindi Certified as Urdu

Shankar Hussain is a 1977 Bollywood film directed by Yusuf Naqvi. It has memorable songs; 'Kahin ek Masoom nazuk si ladki' sung by Mohammed Rafi and 'Aap yoon faaslon se' and 'Apne aap raaton mein', both sung by Lata Mangeshkar, classics of Khayyam's repertoire.

== Plot ==
Dr. Uday Shankar is a kind-hearted Hindu gentleman who has chosen to practice medicine in a village rather than make money by working in a large city. Once, a devastating flood hits a nearby village and he goes there to minister to the affected people. At this time, he happens to rescue a Muslim child, Husain, whose entire family has been wiped out. He raises the boy as his own, alongside his own son, Ajay. As a good Hindu, he decides to raise the boy in the religion of his own parents, and Husain thus grows up to be a practicing Muslim living in the backdrop of a Hindu household. Everyone loves the new addition to the household and Husain also is deeply attached to his new family.

Years later, Husain is studying in college while Ajay returns home after completing his medical studies. Shortly after this, Dr. Uday Shankar dies and Ajay devotes himself to carrying on his father's good name and legacy by serving the poor people of his village as a doctor. Meanwhile, Husain falls in love with a Muslim girl named Gulsum. Ajay also falls in love with a Hindu girl named Kusum. Things get complicated when they find out that Gulsum and Kusum are the same girl. Soon a series of unfortunate events puts Dr. Uday Shankar's family in turmoil and Husain rises up to save his foster family's good name. What is the mystery behind the girl that both brothers have fallen in love with? How will Husain save the honor and dignity of his family?

== Cast ==
- Shreeram Lagoo - Uday Shankar
- Kanwaljit Singh - Hussain
- Madhu Chanda
- Suhail
- Gajanan Jagirdar - Mir Irshad Hussain
- Dina Pathak - Gomti/Sister
- Pradeep Kumar in Guest Appearance
- Roopesh Kumar in Special Appearance
- Jalal Agha in Special Appearance

== Songs ==
The film is noted for its songs by Khayyam.

#	Title	Singer(s)	Lyrics
1	Kahin Ek Masoom Nazuk Si Ladki	Mohammed Rafi	Kamal Amrohi
2	Apne Aap Raton Mein	Lata Mangeshkar	Kaif Bhopali
3	Aap Yun Faaslon Se	Lata Mangeshkar	Jan Nisar Akhtar
4	Achha Unhen Dekha Hai	Aziz Nazan, Babban Khan	Kaifi Azmi
5	Hussain Jab Ke Chale	Lata Mangeshkar	Mir Anees
