= Shobha Gurtu =

Indian classical singer (1925–2004)

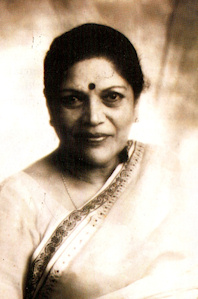

Background information
- Born: Bhanumati Shirodkar; 8 February 1925; Belgaum, Karnataka, India
- Died: 27 September 2004 (aged 79) Mumbai, India
- Genre: Hindustani classical music
- Occupation: singer
- Years active: 1940s–2004

Shobha Gurtu (1925–2004) was an Indian singer in the Hindustani classical style. Though she had equal command over pure classical style, it was with light semi-classical music that she received her fame, and in time came to be known as the Thumri Queen, and for the 'Abhinaya' sung in her full-throated voice. She was awarded the Padma Bhushan in 2002.

== Background and personal life ==
Bhanumati Shirodkar was born in Belgaum, (present Karnataka) in 1925. Her mother, Menekabai Shirodkar, was a professional dancer. Menakabai was a 'gayaki' disciple of Ustad Alladiya Khan of the Jaipur-Atrauli gharana. It was from her that Shobha received her training in music from a very young age.

Shobha married Vishwanath Gurtu, a Kashmiri Brahmin gentleman from a good family, and became known as Shobha Gurtu. Her father-in-law, Pandit Narayan Nath Gurtu, was a highly placed officer in the Police, a scholar and also, as a hobby, he played the sitar. He was posted for several years in Belgaum district, which is how Shobha and Vishwanath became acquainted. The couple had three sons, Ravi, Trilok and Narendra. Their eldest son, Ravi Gurtu, was a rhythm player. Another son, Trilok Gurtu is a famed percussionist.

== Career ==
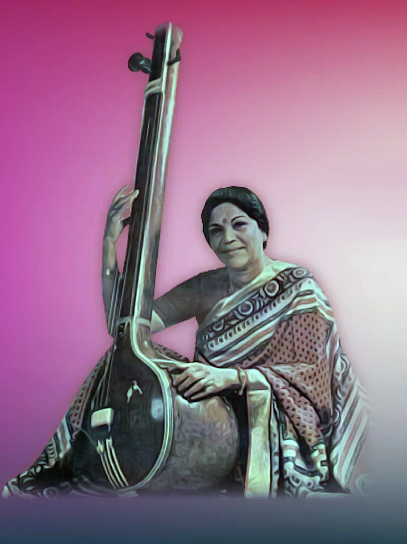
Shobha Gurtu performing in a concert

Though Shobha's formal music training began with 'Ustad Bhurji Khan', the youngest son of Ustad Alladiya Khan, the founder of the Jaipur-Atrauli gharana in Kolhapur, from whom her mother was learning at the time, while she was still a younger girl, and seeing her talent, Ustad Bhurji Khan's family immediately took a liking of her, and she started spending long hours with them. Her ties with the Jaipur-Atrauli gharana were to strengthen still, when she started learning from, Ustad Alladiya Khan's nephew Ustad Natthan Khan; though she really came into her own under the tutelage of Ustad Ghamman Khan, who came to stay with their family in Mumbai, to teach her mother thumri-dadra and other semi-classical forms.

Shobha Gurtu specialised in semi classical forms such as thumri, dadra, Kajri, Hori etc., effortlessly adding pure classical passages into her singing, thus creating a new form, and reviving the magic of forms like Thumri, of which she became a greatest exponent in time. She was particularly influenced by singer Begum Akhtar and Ustad Bade Ghulam Ali Khan.

She also performed music in Marathi and Hindi cinema. As a playback singer, she first worked in Kamaal Amrohi's film, Pakeezah (1972), followed by Phagun (1973), where she sang, 'Bedardi ban gaye koi jaao manaao more saiyyaan'. She earned a Filmfare nomination as Best Female Playback Singer for the song "Saiyyan Rooth Gaye" from the hit film Main Tulsi Tere Aangan Ki (1978). She also sang a popular Bhojpuri folk song 'daroga ji se kahiye' in Kalka (1983 film) which was Shatrughan Sinha' only film production and later sang 'yaad piya ki aaye' in Prahaar: The Final Attack in 1991 which is the only film directed by actor Nana Patekar. In Marathi cinema, she sang for films like Saamna and Lal Mati. In 1979, The Gramophone Company of India (EMI) released her first album At Her Best... Shobha Gurtu, considered a high ranking classic recording displaying her dazzling vocal work in the eastern Uttar Pradesh (Purbi Gayaki) musical tradition rooted in the 19th century.

Over the years, she travelled all over the world for concerts, including one at the Carnegie Hall, New York City, performing alongside musical greats and, Pt. Birju Maharaj. Her album of gazal "Tarz" along with Mehdi Hassan was popular. She often lent her voice to the collaborative jazz albums of her son Trilok Gurtu. In 2000, she featured in the Jana Gana Mana Video, which was released to mark the 50th year of the Indian Republic, where she sang the Indian National Anthem, Jana Gana Mana, along with other leading classical singers and musicians of India.

In 1987, she received the Sangeet Natak Akademi Award, and was later awarded the Lata Mangeshkar Puraskar, Shahu Maharaj Puraskar and the Maharashtra Gaurav Puraskar. In 2002, she was awarded the Padma Bhushan.

After reigning over Hindustani classical music genre, for five decades, as the Queen of Thumri, Shobha Gurtu died on 27 September 2004.

== Awards ==
- Sangeet Natak Akademi Award in 1987
- Padma Bhushan in 2002
- Lata Mangeshkar Puraskar
- Shahu Maharaj Puraskar
- Maharashtra Gaurav Puraskar
