= Romeo and Juliet (1947 film) =

- Directed by: Akhtar Hussain
- Screenplay by: Kamal Amrohi
- Based on: Romeo and Juliet by William Shakespeare
- Starring: Nargis
- Music by: Husnlal–Bhagatram
- Production company: Nargis Art Concern
- Release date: 1947
- Country: India
- Language: Hindi

Romeo and Juliet is a 1947 Indian Hindi-language film directed by Akhtar Hussain. Based on the eponymous tragedy by William Shakespeare, the film's script was written by Kamal Amrohi. The duo of Husnlal–Bhagatram composed the film's music. The film starred D. K. Sapru and Nargis as Romeo and Juliet, respectively; Nargis was also the film's producer via Nargis Art Concern. Although completed by 1947, the film received a wider release in early May 1948.

Unlike other Indian screen adaptations of the era, Romeo and Juliet retained the original character names and "attempted to create an authentic locale". Authors have noted that the film was modeled on MGM's Romeo and Juliet (1936), but the dialogue and songs indicated the "continuing influence of the Parsi theater" on Indian cinema.

According to film scholars Ashish Rajadhyaksha and Paul Willemen, Romeo and Juliet was one of the early films of Nargis' acting career where she was "presented as the femme fatale doomed to destruction by her beauty, an updated version of a stereotype from Islamic literature and music". Romeo and Juliet was a critical success for the actress, with contemporary critic Baburao Patel referring to her as the Indian equivalent of Norma Shearer in the film's review.
