= Bengal Film Journalists' Association - Best Female Playback Singer (Hindi) =

Indian film award

Here is a list of the award winners and the films for which they won.

Year	Singer	Film
2007
2006
2005
2004
2003
2002
2001
2000
1999
1998
1997
1996
1995
1994
1993
1992	Lata Mangeshkar	Lekin...
1991
1990
1989	Alka Yagnik	Qayamat Se Qayamat Tak
1988	Alisha Chinai	Jalwa
1987	Asha Bhosle	Ek Pal
1986	Lata Mangeshkar	Ram Tera Ganga Maili
1985
1984
1983
1982
1981	Lata Mangeshkar	Ek Duuje Ke Liye
1980
1979
1978
1977
1976	Usha Mangeshkar	Jai Santoshi Maa
1975	Lata Mangeshkar	Kora Kagaz
1974
1973	Lata Mangeshkar	Abhimaan
1972	Lata Mangeshkar	Pakeezah
1971	Lata Mangeshkar	Tere Mere Sapne
1970	Lata Mangeshkar	Do Raaste
1969	Lata Mangeshkar	Saraswatichandra
1968	Lata Mangeshkar	Raja Aur Runk
1967	Lata Mangeshkar	Milan
1966	Asha Bhosle	Teesri Kasam
1965	Asha Bhosle	Waqt
1964	Lata Mangeshkar	Woh Kaun Thi?
1963
1962
1961
1960
1959
1958
1957
1956
1955
1954
1953
1952
1951
1950
1949
1948
1947
1946
1945
1944
1943
1942

== See also ==
- Bengal Film Journalists' Association Awards
- Cinema of India
