= Mahal (1949 film) =

1949 film

- Film poster
- Directed by: Kamal Amrohi
- Written by: Kamal Amrohi
- Screenplay by: Kamal Amrohi
- Story by: Kamal Amrohi
- Produced by: Ashok Kumar; Savak Vacha
- Starring: Ashok Kumar; Madhubala
- Cinematography: Josef Wirsching
- Edited by: Bimal Roy; M. Shanker; R. M. Tipnis
- Music by: Khemchand Prakash
- Production company: Bombay Talkies
- Distributed by: Bombay Talkies
- Release date: 19 October 1949
- Running time: 165 min
- Country: India
- Language: Hindustani
- Budget: est. ₹9 lakh (est. ₹12.1 crore as of 2016)
- Box office: est. ₹1.45 crore (est. ₹198 crore as of 2016)

Mahal (transl. "Mansion") is a 1949 Indian Hindi-language psychological supernatural horror film produced by Savak Vacha and Ashok Kumar under the banner of Bombay Talkies, and directed by Kamal Amrohi as his directorial debut. The film centres on a screenplay written by Amrohi, while its music is composed by Khemchand Prakash. Cited as Bollywood's first horror film, it revolves around an aristocrat (Ashok Kumar) who moves into an ancient mansion, where he gets visions of a mysterious lady (Madhubala) claiming to be his lover in their previous lives.

Mahal was produced by Bombay Talkies studio on a modest budget. Amrohi, who made his directorial debut with the film, was turned down by many major female stars before then-fledgling Madhubala was put on the board. The film took a relatively long time filming that earned it a negative reputation in the media.

Mahal was released in theatres in October 1949. Despite mixed-to-negative critical reviews, it emerged as one of the biggest hits of the decade as well as the biggest financial success in Bombay Talkies' history. The film launched Madhubala and playback singer Lata Mangeshkar, who had lent her voice to the film's soundtrack, into super-stardom.

Mahal has influenced a number of horror films since its release. It was listed in British Film Institute's list of "10 great romantic horror films" and ScoopWhoop's "14 Bollywood Horror Movies That You Just Can't Watch Alone".

== Plot ==
Mahal

Mahal is a reincarnation and a ghost story. In Allahabad, there is a beautiful abandoned palace. When a new owner, Hari Shankar (Ashok Kumar), comes to live in this palace, the old gardener narrates the story of incomplete love.

Some 40 to 45 years ago, a man built it and his lover, Kamini (Madhubala), began to live in it. She would wait all day long for the man to come to her at midnight, but he always left before it was morning. One stormy night, the man's ship sank and he drowned. Before leaving Kamini, he tells her that their love will never fail. A few days later, Kamini also died.

When Shankar goes to a bedroom, a photograph falls from the wall and Shankar is astonished to find the man in the photograph looks exactly like him. Then, a woman is heard singing and Shankar follows her voice. He finds her sitting in a room, but she flees when she sees him. Shankar's friend Shrinath (Kanu Roy) arrives and Shankar expresses suspicion on him being the man of the incomplete love story in a previous life. Shrinath tries to calm him, but then the woman reappears. They follow her to the terrace, where she jumps off into water and the two men find nothing when they look down. The next day, Shankar heads back to Kanpur. At Naini, he gets off from a train and goes to the palace. Kamini tells him that she is real, but Shrinath interferes and warns Shankar that she will draw him to death. The ghost appears again and tells Shrinath to stay away from them. Enraged, Shrinath tries to shoot her but fails.

Kamini tells Shankar that if she could enter into a body of a woman whom Shankar likes, she could return to life. She tells Shankar to see the gardener's daughter's face to check if she's beautiful and he can accept Kamini in that face. Meanwhile, Shankar's father arrives after hearing everything from Shrinath and takes him home. Shankar marries Ranjana (Vijayalaxmi). He decides to move far away with his wife in order to forget Kamini. After two years, a disturbed Ranjana wanting to know where Shankar goes every night, follows him when he goes to meet Kamini. Kamini tells him to kill the gardener's daughter so that she can use her body. Hearing everything, Ranjana drinks poison and goes to police station to give a deathbed confession against Shankar of betrayal and poisoning her. Shanker is presented in court and the daughter of the gardener, Asha, is also called there, being accused of the rift between Shankar and Ranjana. Later Asha is revealed to be Kamini. She then accepts that she has played Kamini because she had fallen in love with the man in the photograph, who looks like Shankar. But Shankar is sentenced to death. Later, the police come to know about Ranjana's letter and free Shankar. Shankar rushes to Shrinath's place but dies. The credits roll as a grieving Asha and Shrinath walk away.

== Cast ==
- Ashok Kumar as Hari Shankar
- Madhubala as Kamini
- M. Kumar as Hari Shankar's father
- Vijayalaxmi as Ranjana
- Kanu Roy as Shrinath
- Nazir Hussain as Kamini's father
- Eruch Tarapore
- Sheela Naik
- Leela Pandey
- Neelam
- Kaneez
- Jagannath
- Mohsin
- Laxman Rao
- S.A. Baker
- Ramastri
- Raja Salim

== Production ==
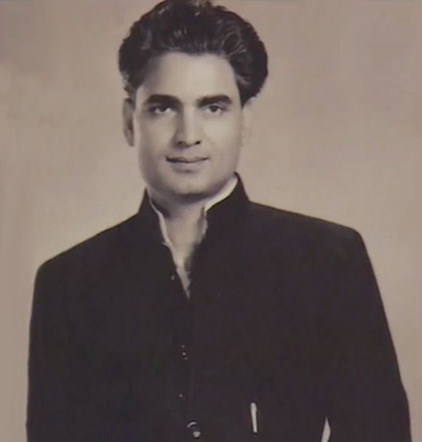
The film's director, Kamal Amrohi (pictured in the 1950s)

Mahal was produced by Savak Vacha and Ashok Kumar under the banner of Bombay Talkies, and written and directed by Kamal Amrohi, who made his directorial debut with the film. It was Kumar who suggested part of the story, recalling a real life incident: in 1948, he was shooting near Jijiboy House at a hill station when, at midnight, the actor saw a headless corpse in a mysterious woman's car. The woman vanished from the scene soon after, and Kumar's servants believed that he might have dreamt the incident. When Kumar went to a nearby police station to register a complaint, a policeman told him that 14 years ago a similar incident happened at the same place—a woman had committed a murder and later died in a road accident.

Kumar narrated the story to Amrohi, who had previously written dialogue for the 1939 Sohrab Modi blockbuster Pukar, but never directed a film. Amrohi partly modified and further developed the story and named the film Mahal, meaning a mansion or a palace. Interestingly, the film's supernatural twist is also reminiscent of a short story by Rupert Croft-Cooke that was made into the film The Fatal Witness in 1945.

The film's plot was rejected by Vacha, who was apprehensive that suspense films do not always find a repeat audience, while Bombay Talkies was already suffering financially due to the box office failure of some of its previous films. However, Kumar insisted that the film may become interesting if directed well and appointed Amrohi as the film's director. Kumar himself agreed to co-produce, bear the losses if any and even star in the film. He entrusted Amrohi to choose a suitable actress for playing Kamini.

The casting of female lead role became complex—several established actresses refused the role and those who accepted it asked high fees. At one point, Suraiya was considered and almost finalized by Vacha, who believed that she and Kumar would make a marketable pair together, but her grandmother appeared unenthusiastic about the film's unconventional story. Meanwhile, Madhubala, a 15-year old rising but not yet popular actress, expressed interest in Kamini's role. Vacha rejected her outright due to her age and relative inexperience, but Amrohi demanded to audition her. "She wasn't a celebrity when I met her first, and since I was looking for someone new, she fit the bill," Amrohi explained later.

According to The Times of India, in her first screen test, Madhubala "looked terrible. Buzz is, German cinematographer Joseph Wirching, who was on the studio's payroll, had been instructed to shoot the teenage actress at her worst." Amrohi helmed the second audition himself and arranged the lights to his own convenience while photographing Madhubala. The young actress now appeared "stunning, even in black-and-white, and everyone agreed that she was the perfect Kamini," states India Times. She secured the role soon after, despite the fact that the film's lead actor, Kumar was more than double her age. The actor said years later: "Madhubala was just about 15 and so raw that she needed several retakes for almost every shot. [...] But Mahal was different, and I was convinced that we wouldn't be miscast."

Throughout the filming of Mahal, the unit suffered financial crisis and Amrohi had to contribute antiques and costumes from his own home because there was not enough money to buy props. Khemchand Prakash was roped in to compose the music, while Nakshab wrote the lyrics. Lata Mangeshkar, Rajkumari Dubey and Zohrabai Ambalewali lent their voices to the soundtrack. Tun Tun was initially offered to sing "Aayega Aanewala", but she refused the offer because of her contract with Kardar Productions. Later, Mangeshkar sang the song in the same ancient mansion where the film was shot. Another track titled "Mushkil Hai Bahut Mushkil", which is about four minutes long was completed by Amrohi and Madhubala in a single take. Despite everyone else's disapproval, Amrohi held Madhubala's talents in high regard, proclaiming that "it was with this film that her true capabilities came to the fore."

The film's ending initially saw the main characters (Shankar and Kamnini) reuniting in their next birth, but the scenes were removed a day before the release on Kumar's suggestions.

== Soundtrack ==
Mahal

Soundtrack album by Khemchand Prakash
- Released: 1942
- Genre: Feature film soundtrack
- Length: 36:00
- Language: Hindi
- Label: Saregama
- Producer: Khemchand Prakash

All lyrics are written by J. Nakshab; all music is composed by Khemchand Prakash

Songs
No.	Title	Singer(s)	Length
1.	"Mahal Theme (Instrumental)"	Khemchand Prakash	3:16
2.	"Ghabra Ke Jo Ham"	Rajkumari	4:04
3.	"Ek Tir Chala"	Rajkumari	4:26
4.	"Chhun Chhun Ghungharwa"	Rajkumari & Zohra Bai	4:42
5.	"Main Woh Hansee Hoon"	Rajkumari	4:49
6.	"Mushkil Hai Bahot" (Raga Pahadi)	Lata Mangeshkar	3:55
7.	"Aayega Aanewala"	Lata Mangeshkar	6:52
8.	"Dil Ne Phir Yaad Kiya"	Lata Mangeshkar	4:14
Total length:			36:00

== Release ==
=== Impact and box office ===
Mahal was theatrically released on 13 October 1949. The film soon gained popularity and by its third week became a nationwide sensation. Due to the failure of previous Bombay Talkies releases, Mahal was completely unexpected to do well and "surprised the prophets of doom who said it would only add to Bombay Talkies' financial woes." A theatre owner told the media, "I am submerged by requests from friends and public to give out passes. I do it for some shows as all shows are always sold out in advance. It is a hit that has hoisted up our revenues beyond expectations and I think it will become a silver jubilee hit for sure. People want to see it over and over again." The film always opened to sold-out shows and there was a widespread demand of booklets carrying the dialogue and the lyrics of soundtrack.

Trade site Box Office India has declared Mahal a "Super Hit". Although exact figures for the film's box-office earnings are not available, film-trade websites provide estimates. Box Office India cited the gross as ₹14.5 million (US$1.92 million), and said that it was the third highest-grossing Hindi film of 1949 after Barsaat and Andaz. In February 2009, the website gave the adjusted gross as ₹410 million (US$8.47 million), and called it the tenth highest-grossing film of the decade (1940s). As of 2020, Mahal remains one of the hundred highest-grossing Indian films in India when adjusted for inflation.

=== Critical reception ===
In the reviews, Madhubala was described as the film's "real hit", rated above the much senior Ashok Kumar, while Wirching's cinematography had inspired a journalist for The Motion Picture Magazine to describe Mahal as "a milestone in the annals of the Indian film industry". However, the overall critical response of Mahal was mixed: Patel called the plot a "fantastic nonsense—pure and unadultrated", and The Motion Picture Magazine described the film as "a story of ghosts, spooks, apparitions, jitters, quivers, bats and snakes", adding that "it succeeds in giving one the creeps, but through more causes than one."

Over time, the film's critical reception has improved greatly and modern-day critics often call it a classic. Writing for Upperstall.com, Karan Bali lauded the film's "richly textured and moody visuals, the imaginative use of sound, its tantalizing ambiguity and [...] its haunting music." Writer Vijay Mishra wrote in his book Bollywood Cinema: Temples of Desire that Mahal "remains the final achievement precisely because it lacks closure and has ambiguous moments built into its very structure. [...] The use of the Hindu story of reincarnation [...] expands the capacities of the gothic form and ultimately connects it with an underlying impulse toward the sublime that characterizes Hindu aesthetic theories generally." In 2020, Gayathri Prabhu reviewed similarly: "Mahal brings together romance and architecture on screen in a way that is distinctly its own. The dynamics between romance and space is also the romance of space, and the only way to bring it to any cinematic fruition would be to give that interplay of romance and space a unique visual syntax. This is what Mahal accomplishes with uncanny exactitude for the entire duration of the opening sequence."

== Legacy ==
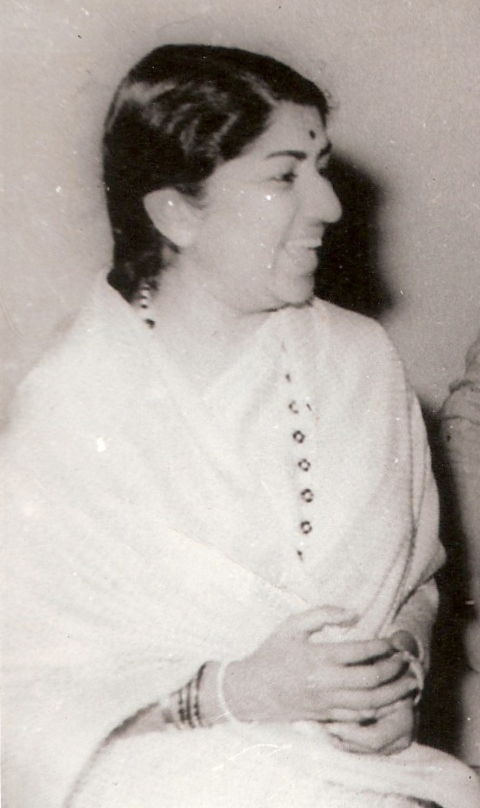
The success of Mahal turned Madhubala and Lata Mangeshkar (pictured) into overnight stars.

The success of Mahal played a major role in the career developments of playback singer Lata Mangeshkar and lead actress Madhubala, as both of them were struggling to get a big break in the film industry. Mahal remained Madhubala's highest-grossing release for the next six years till Mr. & Mrs. '55 (1955), and Mangeshkar often cited "Aayega Aanewala" as one of her favourite songs.

Bimal Roy, who was the editor for Mahal, would later go on to direct Madhumati (1958), which itself went on to become the source of inspiration for many later works dealing with the theme of reincarnation in Indian cinema, Indian television, and perhaps world cinema. Many of its themes were repeated in the Hindi film Karz (1980), which was remade several times: as the Kannada film Yuga Purusha (1989), the Tamil film Enakkul Oruvan (1984), and Om Shanti Om.

== See also ==
- List of Indian horror films

== Sources ==
- Abbasi, Yasir (2018). Yeh Un Dinoñ Ki Baat Hai: Urdu Memoirs of Cinema Legends. Bloomsbury Publishing. ISBN 978-9387471054.
- Akbar, Khatija (1997). Madhubala: Her Life, Her Films. Hay House. ISBN 9788174761538.
- Deep, Mohan (1996). The Mystery and Mystique of Madhubala. Magna Books. ISBN 1906574219.
- Ghosh, Nabendu (1995). Ashok Kumar: His Life and Times. Indus. ISBN 8172232187.
- Mishra, Vijay (2013). Bollywood Cinema: Temples of Desire. Routledge. ISBN 9780415930154.
- Prabhu, Gayathri (2020). Shadow Craft: Visual Aesthetics of Black and White Hindi Cinema. Bloomsbury Academic. ISBN 9789390176267.
