= Prem Nagar (1940 film) =

- Directed by: Mohan Bhavnani
- Screenplay by: D. N. Madhok
- Produced by: Mohan Bhavnani
- Edited by: M. Wadhwani; Pratap D. Parmar
- Music by: Naushad Ali
- Production company: Bhavnani Productions
- Release date: 1940
- Running time: 116 mins
- Country: India
- Language: Hindustani

Prem Nagar (transl. City of Love) is a 1940 Indian Hindi language film. According to the opening credits of the film, Prem Nagar is "a small, happy and contented village somewhere in India. A tiny spark of anger flared up a misunderstanding, a quarrel, jealousy, and greed: So grew envy. This envy burst out into a flame and the flame nearly destroyed the whole village."

== Cast ==
- Husna Banu as Maya
- Bimla Kumari as Malati
- Prof. Ramanand as Madhav
- Rai Mohan as Chandu
- Fatty Prasad as Mukhi
- Nagendra as Shankar
- Girish as Inspector
- Sheil Prabha as Barfi
- Gulzar as Gangi
- Salu as Basiba

== Soundtrack ==
The music of the film was composed by Naushad.

Names of all songs: -

1. Mat Bolo Bahaar Ki Batiyaan
2. Yeh Thandi Hawayen
3. Yeh Lal Rang Kab Mujhe
4. Bye Bye Miss Goodnight
5. Kiska Mahal Hai
6. Yeh Kaisa Sur Mandir
7. Jaa Mujhe Na Ab Yaad Aa
8. Pyase Do Badan Pyasi Raat Mein
9. Ek Maumma Hai
