= Kersi Lord =

Indian composer, music arranger and accordion player

- Born: 14 February 1935
- Died: 16 October 2016 (aged 81); Mumbai, Maharashtra, India
- Occupations: arranger, conductor, composer, score composer
- Years active: 1949–2016
- Parent(s): Cowas Lord, Banubai Lord

Kersi Lord (14 February 1935 – 16 October 2016) was an Indian film score composer, music arranger and accordion player. He was particularly well known for his association with noted Indian music composers like Naushad, Madan Mohan, S. D. Burman, Laxmikant-Pyarelal, R. D. Burman, Kalyanji–Anandji and Usha Khanna.

== Biography ==
Kersi was born in Mumbai to Cowas and Banubai Lord. His father was a pioneering Indian percussionist who is credited with bringing the bongo and conga to Hindi film music. His mother came from a family of musicians. His younger sister Hilla played the piano and brother Burjor (also known as Buji) is a prominent percussionist.

== Early career ==
Lord started his career at the age of 14. He would often accompany his father to the studios. In 1949–50, Naushad ji was composing music for the film Jadoo and enquired with Cowas Kaka about master Kersi who was accompanying him in the studios. Knowing that Kersi was being groomed by Cowas Kaka, Naushad ji allowed Kersi to play Bongos in the recording of the song Lo Pyar Ki Ho Gai Jeet. Kersi soon joined the orchestras as a percussionist, playing various Latin-American instruments, especially the jazz drums.

== Death ==
He died in October 2016, aged 81. He had developed age-related illnesses and had been hospitalised for nearly a week. His funeral was held at the Parsi Crematorium in Worli.

== Personal life ==
Lord is survived by his daughters Jasmin, Perizad and Zarine.
