= Vinod Mehta =

Indian journalist, editor and political commentator (1941 – 2015)

- Born: 31 May 1941; Rawalpindi, Punjab, British India
- Died: 8 March 2015 (aged 73); Delhi, India
- Education: Bachelor of Arts
- Alma mater: University of Lucknow
- Occupation: Journalist
- Years active: 1974–2012
- Employer: Outlook India
- Spouse: Sumita Paul

Vinod Mehta (31 May 1941 – 8 March 2015) was an Indian journalist, editor and political commentator. He was also the founder editor-in-chief of Outlook from 1995 to 2012 and had been editor of publications such as The Pioneer, The Sunday Observer, The Independent and The Indian Post. He was also the author of several books.

== Life ==
On 31 May 1941, Mehta was born in Rawalpindi, in Punjab, British India. His family became refugees in 1945. He grew up as an army boy in Lucknow, an experience that turned him into a determined secularist. He attended La Martinere school and the university there.

Mehta lived in New Delhi. He was married to Sumita Paul, a journalist who has worked for The Pioneer and the Sunday edition of The Times of India. He had a daughter from a prior relationship, the existence of whom he revealed in a memoir after encouragement from his wife.

Mehta died of multi-organ failure in New Delhi on 8 March 2015, after a prolonged illness.

== Career ==
Leaving home with a third-class BA degree, Mehta experimented with a string of jobs, including that of a factory-hand in suburban Britain, before accepting an offer to edit Debonair in 1974, a men's magazine.

Mehta became one of India's most influential editors by launching a number of successful publications such as the Sunday Observer in 1981, The Indian Post in 1987, The Independent in 1989, The Pioneer (Delhi edition) in 1990 and, finally, Outlook in 1995. He was editorial chairman of the Outlook Group.

Mehta was forced to resign from the editorship of The Independent newspaper in 1989, 29 days after launching it, because of a story based on a dubious RAW report, calling the Maharashtrian politician Y. B. Chavan a spy, which Mehta ran with an eight-column banner headline.

Vinod Mehta has authored a biography of Meena Kumari and Sanjay Gandhi, and published (in 2001) a collection of his articles under the title Mr Editor, How Close Are You to the PM? His memoir, Lucknow Boy, was published in 2011. Mehta is infamous for his comment praising Pakistan's military dictator Pervez Musharraf at Agra Summit held in 2001 where he said to Musharraf that "I support you so much that in India, they call me your man."

Mehta was a TV panellist and frequently appeared on TV shows like Newshour on Times Now and India at 9 at CNN-IBN. He was called upon by news anchors as a senior journalist and was sought after for his analysis of major issues and scenarios. He remained editor-in-chief of Outlook till February 2012.

He was president of the Editors Guild of India and was, briefly, the writer and presenter of "Letter from India" on the BBC World Service and BBC Radio 4.

On 9 February 2015 he was awarded the Yash Bharti Award by the Government of Uttar Pradesh for his work in the field of journalism.

== Lawsuit ==
In 2012 the Indian Express attempted to sue Mehta for defamation after he had hinted that a story it had run was planted.

== Praise ==
In her column in The Indian Express, Coomi Kapoor, who worked under Mehta for many years, said

As an editor Vinod Mehta never pulled rank, giving correspondents a free hand if he felt they had a valid story to tell, no matter the consequences...He had an unconventional approach towards editing newspapers, brimming with ideas he was shorn of any pomposity.

== Major works ==
- Bombay: A Private View (1971)
- Meena Kumari (1972) [Re-launched in May 2013], ISBN 978-9350296257
- Mr Editor, how close are you to the PM? (1999), ISBN 978-8122005332
- Lucknow Boy: A Memoir (2010), ISBN 978-0670085293
- The Sanjay Story (2012), ISBN 978-9350295816
- Editor Unplugged (2014)
