= Raju Bharatan =

Indian journalist (1934–2020)

Raju Bharatan

Raju Bharatan (1934 – February 7, 2020) was a journalist and writer on Indian cricket and Bollywood music. He worked for a weekly features magazine, The Illustrated Weekly of India, and an Indian films weekly newspaper, Screen. He also directed The Victory Story (1974), the first full-length Indian cricket documentary.

He died aged 86 in Mumbai in February 2020 after a prolonged illness. His wife, Girija Rajendran, who predeceased him, was also a film journalist.

== Books ==
Bharatan wrote a number of books on cricket and on Hindi film music personalities, with whom he had a close association.

- Asha Bhosle: A Musical Biography (Publisher: Hay House; Latest edition (5 August 2016) ISBN 978-9385827150)
- Naushadnama: The Life & Music of Naushad (Publisher: Hay House India (2014) ISBN 978-9381431931)
- A Journey Down Melody Lane (Publisher: Hay House (1 September 2010) ASIN 569J1NC Kindle edition in Amazon.in )
- Lata Mangeshkar: A Biography (Publisher: UBS Publishers Distributors (2 January 1995) ISBN 978-8174760234
- Indian Cricket: The Vital Phase ( Published by Bell Books, 1977)
- Rivals in the Sun: A Survey of the 1952 Tour of England (Publisher: Popular Book Depot, 1952)
