= Daaera =

1953 film by Kamal Amrohi

- Poster
- Directed by: Kamal Amrohi
- Written by: Kamal Amrohi
- Produced by: Kamal Amrohi
- Starring: Meena Kumari; Nasir Khan
- Cinematography: Mukadam
- Edited by: Wishwanath Kamat
- Music by: Jamal Sen
- Production companies: The Bombay Talkies Studio, Malad
- Release date: 1953
- Running time: 140 Minutes
- Country: India
- Language: Hindi

Daaera (transl. Circle) is a 1953 Indian film written and directed by Kamal Amrohi, starring Meena Kumari and Nasir Khan. It was released at Bombay's Naaz cinema. Its story is loosely based on Kamal Amrohi and Meena Kumari's own love story.

== Plot ==
One night a critically ill man arrives in town looking for a doctor. As the doctor is not there, he is directed to a nearby haveli for shelter. He rents an apartment there with his young wife Sheetal (Meena Kumari). Their age disparity is such that most people assume Sheetal to be his daughter. When the doctor comes to check on him, he also notices symptoms of the same disease in Sheetal and asks her to be careful. Sharan (Nasir Khan), the proprietor's son, lives in the apartment opposite and is entranced by the sight of Sheetal on the balcony. His inability to fulfil his desire leads him into a deep melancholia. When Sheetal's husband is called away on business, she befriends a young girl Gomti who has been punished for having fallen in love. Gomti is shocked to discover that the old man with her is not her father but her husband. Sheetal is a dutiful wife and keeps on caring for her husband even as her own condition deteriorates.

Sharan's mother is unable to see her son's mournful state anymore and attempts to arrange his marriage to Sheetal. When her efforts are unsuccessful, her son-in-law tries to hatch a plan to trick Sharan into marrying someone else. In the midst of this, Sheetal's husband is in a tragic railway accident and is believed to be dead. Sharan's brother-in law tries to convince his mother to accept Sharan's marriage to a widow. After much convincing she finally accepts. But in a final twist it is revealed that her husband has survived and has returned to her. In a remarkable final sequence Sheetal watches from her balcony as Sharan's marriage takes place and passes away in silence. This poetic film takes place in large portions through a beautiful elegiac soundtrack and its mournful silences.

== Cast ==
- Meena Kumari as Sheetal
- Nasir Khan as Sharan Kumar
- Nana Palsikar as Sharan's brother-in-law
- Pratima Devi as Sharan's Mother
- Jankidas as Dr. Ali Baker
- Brahm Bhardwaj as Dr. Baker's Servant
- M.Kumar as Sheetal's husband

== Soundtrack ==
Song	Singer
"Devta Tum Ho Mera Sahara, Maine Thama Hai Daman Tumhara"	Mohammed Rafi, Mubarak Begum
"Jali Jo Shama"	Mubarak Begum
"Suno More Naina"	Mubarak Begum
"Deep Ke Sang Jaloon Main"	Mubarak Begum
"Aa Bhi Ja Meri Duniya Mein"	Talat Mahmood
"Aansoo To Nahin Hai"	Talat Mahmood
"Ae Chand Sitaron"	Talat Mahmood
"Kaho Dola Utare Kahaar"	Asha Bhosle
