= Dil Apna Aur Preet Parai =

- Theatrical release poster
- Directed by: Kishore Sahu
- Written by: Kishore Sahu; Madhusudan (supervising writer)
- Produced by: Kamal Amrohi
- Starring: Raaj Kumar; Meena Kumari; Nadira
- Cinematography: Josef Wirsching
- Edited by: Kantilal B. Shukla
- Music by: Shankar Jaikishan
- Production company: Mahal Pictures
- Release date: 4 March 1960
- Running time: 155 min
- Country: India
- Language: Hindi

Dil Apna Aur Preet Parai (transl. My Heart is Mine and My Love is for Someone Else's) is a 1960 Indian Hindi-language romantic drama film, produced by S. A. Bagar. It was written and directed by Kishore Sahu. The film stars Raaj Kumar, Meena Kumari and Nadira as leads. The film tells the story of a surgeon who is obligated to marry the daughter of a family friend, while he is in love with a colleague nurse, played by Meena Kumari. It is one of the noted acting performances of lead actress Meena Kumari's career.

The film's music is by Shankar Jaikishan, and features a hit song, "Ajeeb Dastan Hai Yeh". At the 1961 Filmfare Awards it created an upset by beating the popular musical epic, Mughal-e-Azam of Naushad, for the Best Music Director category.

== Plot ==
Sushil Verma is a surgeon in the Shimla Hospital. He lives on the hospital grounds in a doctor's house with his aging mother and younger sister Munni. After Sushil's father died, his father's close friend paid Sushil's medical school fees, thus creating a debt that Sushil's mother feels needs to be fulfilled. Karuna is a nurse who comes to Shimla Hospital and first encounters Sushil during an emergency surgery. Both are clearly besotted with each other, but keep their feelings restrained.

By chance, on a nurses' beach day trip, Karuna meets Munni, who injures herself whilst playing. She takes Munni back to her house, not knowing that she is Dr. Verma's sister, and the house she is visiting belongs to him. She dresses Munni's wounds, sees how much work needs to be done in the house, and the fact that his mother is too ill to attend to household tasks. She immediately steps in and helps out; cooking, cleaning and taking care of everyone. Sushil comes home to see this and falls even more in love.

However, later on, his mother organises a trip to Kashmir for the whole family, and guilt-trips Sushil into marrying Kusum, the daughter of the man who paid for his medical school fees.

They come back to Shimla, and Karuna is devastated when she finds this out. Although she manages to conceal this for a while, situations keep arising and Kusum soon gets jealous of Sushil's preference for Karuna, and her perceived ill-treatment. Kusum manipulates and mistreats her mother-in-law and sister-in-law, until Sushil orders her out of the house. She goes back to Kashmir.

Dr. Verma's mother then realises her mistake, that she should have gotten him married to Karuna.

To avoid scandal, Karuna moves to another hospital. But Kusum seeks to enact revenge on her. Dr. Verma finds this out and tries to beat Kusum to Karuna, which leads to a clifftop high speed car chase, resulting in Kusum's death. The film concludes with the reunion of Karuna and Sushil.

== Cast ==
- Raaj Kumar as Dr. Sushil K. Verma
- Meena Kumari as Karuna
- Nadira as Kusum
- Ruby Myers as Head Nurse
- Tun Tun as Haseena
- Om Prakash as Girdhari
- Shammi as Sheela
- Kumari Naaz as Munni
- Pratima Devi as Mrs. K. Verma (as Protima Devi)
- Edwina as Nurse Rosie
- Helen as Cabaret Dancer
- Raj Kishore as Singer in item song, 'Jane Kahan Gayi'

== Soundtrack ==
The Hawaiian-themed song "Ajeeb Dastan Hai Yeh" is based on "My Lips Are Sealed" by Jim Reeves. All songs were written by Shailendra and Hasrat Jaipuri.

All music is composed by Shankar Jaikishan.

| No. | Title | Lyrics | Singer(s) | Length |
|---|---|---|---|---|
| 1. | "Ajeeb Dastan Hai Yeh" | Shailendra | Lata Mangeshkar |
| 2. | "Andaz Mera Mastana" | Shailendra | Lata Mangeshkar |
| 3. | "Dil Apna Aur Preet Parai" | Shailendra | Lata Mangeshkar |
| 4. | "Itni Badi Mehfil" | Hasrat Jaipuri | Asha Bhosle |
| 5. | "Jane Kahan Gai" | Shailendra | Mohammed Rafi |
| 6. | "Mera Dil Ab Tera Ho Sajna" | Shailendra | Lata Mangeshkar |
| 7. | "Sheesha-E-Dil Itna Na Uchhalo" | Hasrat Jaipuri | Lata Mangeshkar |

== Awards ==
- 1961 Filmfare Award for Best Music Director for Shankar Jaikishan
