= Kamal Amrohi =

Indian film director and screenwriter (1918–1993)

- کمال امروہی
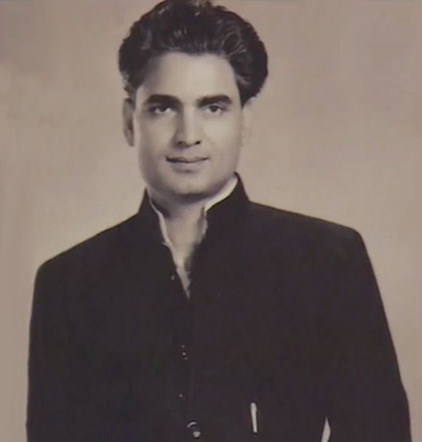
- Kamal Amrohi in the 1950s
- Born: Syed Amir Haider Kamal Naqvi; 17 January 1918; Amroha, United Provinces of Agra and Oudh, British India (present-day Uttar Pradesh, India)
- Died: 11 February 1993 (aged 75); Bombay, Maharashtra, India
- Burial place: Rahmatabad cemetery, Mumbai
- Other names: Kamal Amrohvi, Chandan.
- Occupations: film director and producer, screenwriter, dialogue writer
- Spouses: Bilkis Bano (died) Mehmoodi (died 1982): Meena Kumari (m. 1952; d. 1972)
- Children: 3
- Awards: 1961: Filmfare Best Dialogue Award: Mughal E Azam

Syed Amir Haider Kamal Naqvi (17 January 1918 – 11 February 1993), popularly known as Kamal Amrohi, was an Indian film director and screenwriter. He was also an Urdu and Hindi poet.

His Hindi films include Mahal (1949), Pakeezah (1972) and Razia Sultan (1983). He established Kamal Pictures (Mahal Films) in 1953 and Kamalistan Studio in Bombay in 1958.

== Early life ==
Kamal Amrohi was a Shia Muslim born in Amroha, United Provinces in British India (present-day Uttar Pradesh) and later took on the name Kamal Amrohi (or Amrohvi). He was a first cousin to Pakistani writers Jaun Elia and Rais Amrohvi.

== Career ==
In 1938, he left Amroha to study in Lahore, now part of Pakistan, where singer K. L. Saigal discovered him and took him to Mumbai (Bombay) to work for Sohrab Modi's Minerva Movietone film company, where he started his career working on films like Jailor (1938), Pukar (1939), Bharosa (1940), A. R. Kardar's film (Shahjehan 1946). He made his debut as a director in 1949, with Mahal, starring Madhubala and Ashok Kumar, which was a musical hit, with songs by Lata Mangeshkar and Rajkumari Dubey.

He directed only four films; of these were Mahal (1949) for Bombay Talkies, Daaera (1953) with Meena Kumari and Nasir Khan, Pakeezah, which was conceived in 1958 but was not brought to the screen until 1972. He also wrote the screenplay, lyrics and produced the latter. Film Pakeezah (1972) has been called one of the extraordinary musical melodramas ever made in India, although flawed but noble. Meena Kumari herself, in her public comments to the press, after seeing the movie, said that it was Kamal Amrohi's tribute to her. This was followed by Razia Sultan (1983), his last film.

Kamal Mahal, Mumbai in 1940

He wrote scripts for the movies made by Sohrab Modi, Abdul Rashid Kardar and K. Asif. He was one of the four dialogue writers for the latter's famous 1960 movie, Mughal-e-Azam, for which he won the Filmfare Award.

As a director, he developed a style that combined a stylised direction with minimalist performances. This style was different from the one with expressive acting that was common in Indian cinema of his period.

In 1958, he started Kamaal Studios for his banner Mahal Films, though it closed down after three years and later changed hands to become Natraj Studios.

=== Incomplete films ===
- Anarkali (early 1950s), starring Madhubala and Kamal Kapoor, chronicling the life of the eponymous 16th century courtesan. Amrohi developed this project parallel to K. Asif's Mughal-e-Azam, another film on similar subject matter, for which Amrohi wrote the dialogue. Amrohi was later compelled by Asif to shelve Anarkali and focus unilaterally on Mughal-e-Azam.
- Sayyad (mid-1950s), starring Prem Nath, directed by Amrohi and produced by Ataullah Khan and Madhubala. The film was shelved midway, causing major financial losses for the producers.
- Aakhri Mughal (late 1960s), conceived by Amrohi as a starring vehicle for Dharmendra. The film remained incomplete. In the 1990s, J. P. Dutta unsuccessfully tried to revive the production featuring actor Abhishek Bachchan.
- Majnoon (1979), one of the final projects of Amrohi's career, starring Rajesh Khanna and Rakhee Gulzar.

== Personal life ==
Amrohi married four times: His first wife was Bilkis Bano (who was a maid to Nargis's mother, Jaddan Bai). After her death, he married Sayeda Al-Zehra Mehmoodi, daughter of Jamal Hasan. She remained his senior wife throughout his marriage to Meena Kumari, and died on 9 April 1982. He met Meena Kumari during the filming of Tamasha. Veteran actor Ashok Kumar introduced them. They fell in love and married on 14 February 1952, on Valentine's Day in a much private ceremony. Only Amrohi's friend Baaqar Ali and Meena Kumari's younger sister Madhu were aware of this development.

The couple then made Daera (1953 film), a film based on their love story, however the movie tanked at the box office. During the filming of Azaad in 1954, both of them planned another movie, Pakeezah. The film went on studio floors by 1956, but as the craze of colour films increased, particularly after the release of Mother India (1957), the black & white scenes were re-shot to colour sequences. After the release of Guru Dutt's classic Kaagaz Ke Phool (1959 film) which marked the arrival of Cinemascope technique, the film was again shot, this time in Cinemascope. By the 1960s, Meena Kumari was at the peak of her career which caused tensions between the couple and ultimately led to a mutual separation in March 1964. Film Pakeezah got shelved. In March 1969, the film was revived with an ill Meena Kumari, (due to her alcoholism) in the lead. They lived together for a total of 11 years. Raaj Kumar was roped in, as by that time, Ashok Kumar- the original lead was too old to portray the hero of the film.

Pakeezah was released on 4 February 1972, 14 years after it first began. It received a lukewarm response from the critics. Although the film received warm reception from the audience, it was Meena Kumari's untimely death on 31 March 1972 which acted as an ultimate push and made it one of the top grossers of that year. The film is now considered as a cult classic and has a status much similar to K. Asif's 1960 magnum opus, Mughal-E-Azam.

Kamal Amrohi got married for the fourth time with his physician. During his last years, he used to regularly visit the hospital for minor ailments. There he met his fourth wife, who was actually his doctor. After the death of Mehmoodi in 1982, Amrohi felt lonely and in order to avoid being a burden on his children, he decided to get married, drawing sharp reactions from the media.

Kamal Amrohi had three children with Mehmoodie: two sons, Shandaar and Taajdaar, both of whom worked with him in Razia Sultan, and a daughter, Rukhsar Amrohi. He had no children with Bilkis Bano, Meena Kumari and later in his life with his fourth wife. His son Shandaar died on 21 August 2011 in Goa. He was laid to rest in Mumbai the following day.

His grandson Mashhoor Amrohi is also an actor.

== Kamal Amrohi Studios ==
Kamal Amrohi Studios (Kamalistan Studios) was established in 1958, spread over 15 acre, it is situated in Jogeshwari East, off Jogeshwari – Vikhroli Link Road in Mumbai. It continues to run, managed by Amrohi's son and daughter, Tajdar Amrohi & Rukhsar Amrohi; despite 2010 news reports of it being sold, and continued litigation thereafter. Over the years, it has been venues of films like Razia Sultan (1983) Kamal Amrohi's last film as a director, Amar Akbar Anthony (1977) and Kaalia (1981), Khalnayak (1993), Koyla (1997), and recently the first schedule of film, Dabangg 2 was shot there in 2012, apart from the television shows are also shot at the complex.

== Death and legacy ==
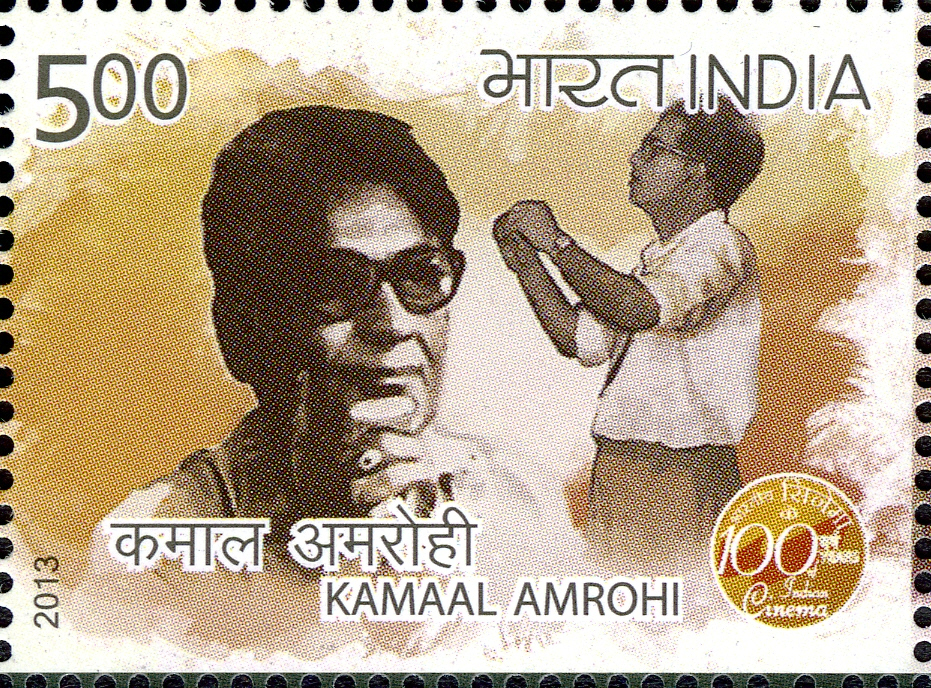
Amrohi on a 2013 stamp of India

Amrohi died on 11 February 1993 in Mumbai, twenty one years after his wife Meena Kumari's death and ten years after making his last film, Razia Sultan (1983). He was buried next to Meena Kumari in Rehmatabad Qabristan, an Indian-Iranian graveyard in Mumbai.

Six days after his death, UK daily The Independent, published an obituary for Kamal Amrohi, calling him Moghul-like and presiding over Hindi film industry for over five decades.

Kamal Amrohi's only daughter from his second wife, Mehmoodie, Rukhsaar Amrohi gave a newspaper interview describing her version of life-events, which she witnessed, between her father Kamal Amrohi and Meena Kumari.

In February 2022, Music label Saregama and actor Bilal Amrohi (grandson of Kamal Amrohi) announced a web series on the love story of Amrohi and Meena Kumari against the backdrop of making of the film Pakeezah. The series which will be helmed by Yoodlee films is expected to go on floors in 2023. In September 2024, director Siddharth P. Malhotra, announced Kamal Aur Meena, an official biopic focusing on the tumultuous relationship between Amrohi and his wife Meena Kumari in collaboration with the Amrohi family. The film which will be written by Bhavani Iyer and Kausar Munir with lyrics penned by Irshad Kamil and music by A. R. Rahman, is expected to release in 2026.

== Filmography ==
Title	Year	Credited as/for						References
Title	Year	Director	Producer	Story	Screenplay	Dialogue	Lyrics	References
Jailor	1938			✓				
Chhalia	1938					✓		
Pukar	1939			✓	✓		✓	
Prem Ki Jyot	1939				✓			
Main Hari	1940				✓	✓		
Bharosa	1940			✓				
Pagal	1940			✓				
Mazaaq	1943					✓		
Phool	1945				✓	✓		
Shahjehan	1946			✓				
Romeo and Juliet	1947				✓	✓		
Mahal	1949	✓		✓	✓			Directorial debut
Saqi	1952					✓		
Daaera	1953	✓	✓	✓	✓			
Dil Apna Aur Preet Parai	1960		✓					
Mughal E Azam	1960					✓		Won-Filmfare Best Dialogue Award
Zindagi aur Khwab	1961			✓				
Pakeezah	1972	✓	✓	✓	✓	✓	✓	Nominated-Filmfare Award for Best Director.
Shankar Hussain	1977			✓	✓	✓	✓	
Majnoon	1979	✓	✓					Incomplete film
Razia Sultan	1983	✓		✓	✓			Last film

== Soundtrack ==
1998 Such a Long Journey (writer: "Thare Rahiyo")

== Awards and recognition ==
- 1961: Filmfare Award for Best Dialogue: Mughal-e-Azam (1960)
- 1972: Nominated for Filmfare Award for Best Director for film Pakeezah (1972).
