= Shri Ram Bhakta Hanuman =

1948 Hindi religious film

- Directed by: Homi Wadia
- Screenplay by: Homi Wadia
- Story by: Shivram Vashikar
- Based on: Valmiki Ramayana
- Produced by: Homi Wadia
- Starring: Trilok Kapoor; S. N. Tripathi; Sona Chatterjee
- Cinematography: P. N. Ram Rao
- Edited by: Sheikh Ismail; Dandekar
- Music by: S. N. Tripathi
- Production company: Basant Pictures
- Release date: 1948
- Country: India
- Language: Hindi

Shri Ram Bhakta Hanuman (Hanuman, The Worshipper of Lord Rama) is a 1948 Hindi religious film produced and directed by Homi Wadia for Basant Pictures. The story was adapted from Valmiki's Ramayana by Shivram Vashikar and the dialogues were written by P. C. Joshi. S. N. Tripathi not only provided music for the film but acted the main role of Hanuman. The film starred Trilok Kapoor, S. N. Tripathi, Sona Chatterjee, Niranjan Sharma and Prabhash Joshi.

The story taken from an episode of Valmiki Ramayana centre's around the abduction of Sita by Ravana, and Hanuman's support to Rama and Lakshman in the battle against Ravana.

== Plot ==
Ravana (Niranjan Sharma) orders Maricha to turn into a deer to entice Sita (Sona Chatterjee) with the notion of kidnapping her. Rama (Trilok Kapoor), Lakshman (Prabhash Joshi) and Sita are in the Panchavati forest for their fourteen-year exile. Espying the golden deer sent by Ravana to lure Rama away, Sita asks Rama to get it. On hearing a cry of pain she sends Lakshman after his brother thinking he's hurt. Ravan comes in the guise of a hermit begging alms and makes Sita step over the Lakshman Rekha (line), Lakshman had drawn around their cottage for her safety, asking her not to step beyond it. In their search for Sita, Ram and Lakshman meet Hanuman (S. N. Tripathi) whom they help in the fight between Sugriva and Bali. Hanuman then helps in finding Sita. He goes through several challenges in his devotion to Ram. Hanuman becomes a major factor in the battle between Rama and Ravana resulting in the victory of Rama and Shri Ram's subsequent return to Ayodhya. The movie ends with Lord Rama's coronation and Hanuman tearing down his heart to show Rama and Sita residing there.

== Cast ==
- S. N. Tripathi as Hanuman
- Trilok Kapoor as Shri Rama
- Prabhash Joshi as Lakshman
- Sona Chatterjee as Sita
- Niranjan Sharma as Ravana/Sugriva
- Leela Kumari as Mandodari
- Pandit Amarnath as Angad
- Dalpat as Meghnad
- Shri Bhagwan as Vibhishan
- Rajni
- Kamal Kumar as Nal
- Korega

== Music ==
The music composer was S. N. Tripathi who gave music for several mythological and fantasy films and was "tagged as a mythological composer" His use of classical Raagas brought an authenticity to the songs making them popular even today. The lyrics of the film are credited to Homi Wadia with the singers including S. N. Tripathi, Sona Chatterjee and Mukesh.

=== Song list ===
| # | Title | Singer |
|---|---|---|
| 1 | "Aayee Basant Ritu Aayee" | Sona Chatterjee |
| 2 | "Raghupati Raghav Rajaram" | S. N. Tripathi |
| 3 | "Ram Ram Siya Ram" | S. N. Tripathi |
| 4 | "Beet Chali Barkha Ritu Seete" | Mukesh |
| 5 | "Hey Khag Mrig Hey Madhukar" | Mukesh |
| 6 | "Ram Ho Ram Ho Naina Mere Bhar Bhar Aaye" | Sona Chatterjee |
| 7 | "Kahe Barsat Badarva Barsat Nayan Hamare" | |
| 8 | "Maharaj Ho Maharaj Ras Barse Tore Dwar" | |

== Remake ==
It was remade in 1957 as Pawan Putra Hanuman starring Mahipal, S.N.Tripathi, B. M. Vyas and Anita Guha by Babubhai Mistri and again in 1969, starring Abhi Bhattacharya, Raaj Kumar and B.M.Vyas directed by Shantilal Soni.
