= Aladdin =

Middle-Eastern folk tale

Aladdin and the Wonderful Lamp
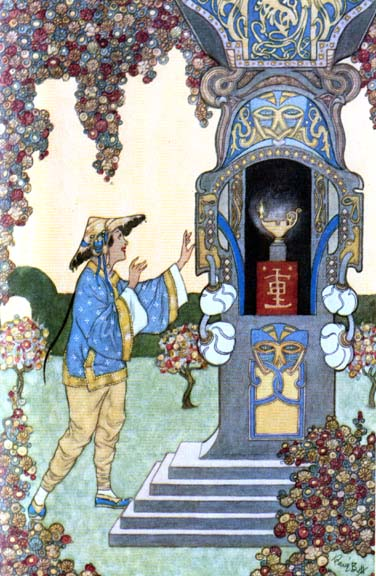
- Aladdin finds the marvelous lamp inside the cave of wonders. A c. 1898 illustration by René Bull.

Folk tale
- Name: Aladdin and the Wonderful Lamp
- Aarne–Thompson grouping: ATU 561 (Aladdin)
- Region: Middle East

Aladdin (/əˈlædɪn/ ə-LAD-in; Arabic: علاء الدين, romanized: ʻAlāʼ ad-Dīn, IPA: [ʕalaːʔ adˈdiːn], ATU 561, 'Aladdin') is a Middle-Eastern folk tale. It is one of the best-known tales associated with One Thousand and One Nights (often known in English as The Arabian Nights), despite not being part of the original text; it was added by the Frenchman Antoine Galland, based on a folk tale that he heard from the Syrian story-teller Hanna Diyab.

== Sources ==
Known along with Ali Baba as one of the "orphan tales", the story was not part of the original Nights manuscripts and any authentic Arabic textual source has not been found. It was incorporated into the book Les mille et une nuits by its French translator, Antoine Galland.

John Payne quotes passages from Galland's unpublished diary recording Galland's encounter with a Maronite story-teller from Aleppo, Hanna Diyab. According to Galland's diary, he met with Hanna, who had travelled from Aleppo to Paris with the French traveller Paul Lucas, on March 25, 1709. Hanna told various tales to Galland so he would end the book. Galland wrote his summaries of Hanna's performances and used a number of the tales (but not all). For Aladdin, Hanna gave him a manuscript, so Galland didn't record a summary in his diary.

Galland's diary further reports that his transcription of "Aladdin" for publication occurred in the winter of 1709–10. It was included in his volumes ix and x of the Nights, published in 1710, without any mention or published acknowledgment of Hanna's contribution.

Payne later recorded the discovery in the Bibliothèque Nationale in Paris of two Arabic manuscripts containing Aladdin (alongside Zayn al-Asman). One was written by a Syrian Christian priest living in Paris, named Dionysios Shawish, alias Dom Denis Chavis. The other was supposed to be a copy the Arab scholar Mikha'il Sabbagh made of a manuscript written in Baghdad in 1703. It was purchased by the Bibliothèque Nationale at the end of the nineteenth century.

The Arabist Hermann Zotenberg believed in the authenticity of Sabbagh Manuscript, so he published a critical edition of the Arabic version of Sabbagh in 1888. This version was used by Sir Richard Burton in his English translation of Aladdin (Supplementary Nights Volume III). Sabbagh's version is still used by modern translators (like Jarouche) as an alternative to Galland's version.

As part of his work on the first critical edition of the Syrian branch of the Nights, the Arabist scholar Muhsin Mahdi has shown that both the Chavis and Sabbagh manuscripts are "back-translations" of Galland's French text into Arabic.

Ruth B. Bottigheimer and Paulo Lemos Horta have argued that Hanna Diyab should be understood as the original author of some of the stories he supplied, and even that several of Diyab's stories (including Aladdin) were partly inspired by Diyab's own life, as there are parallels with his autobiography.

== Plot ==
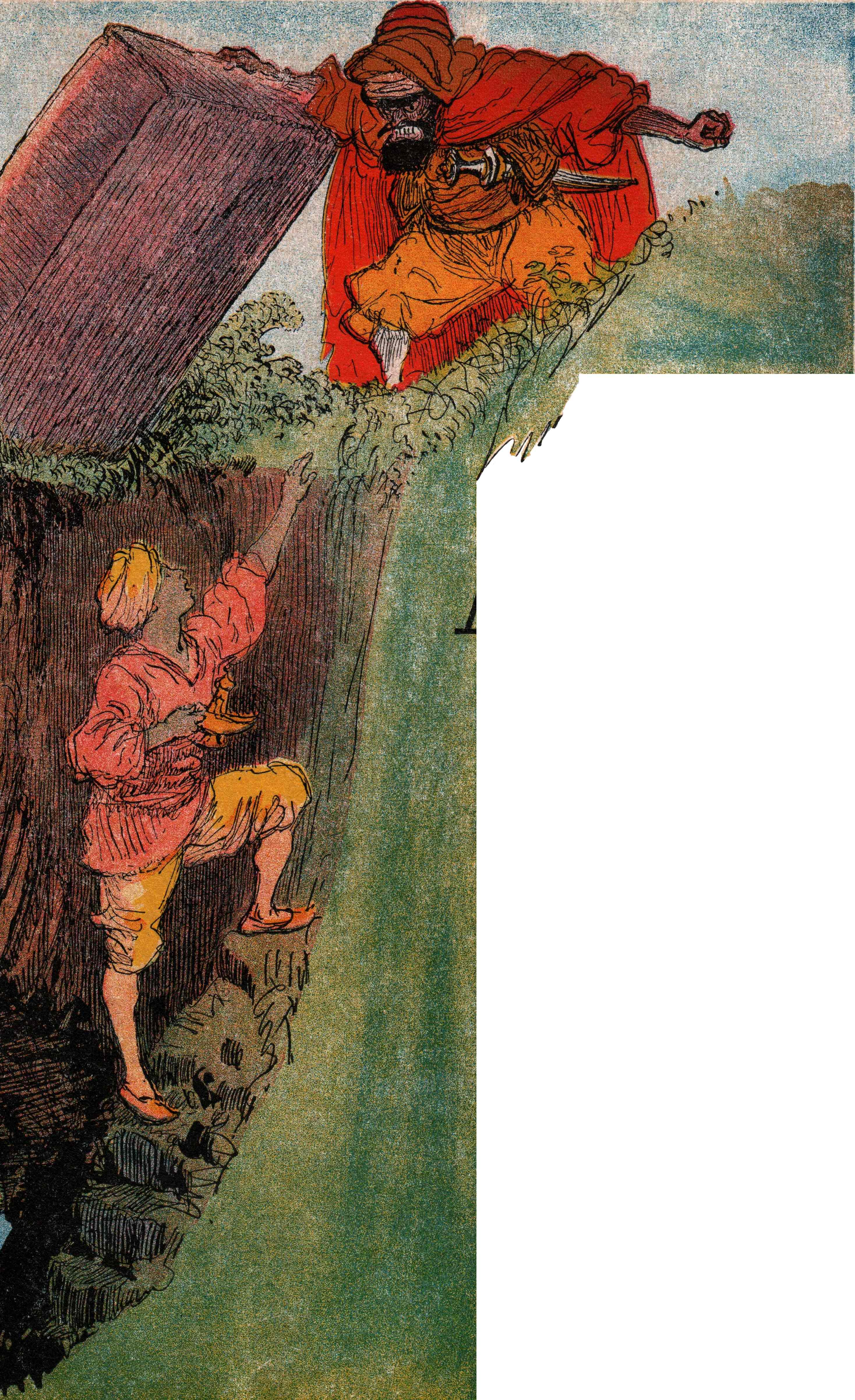
The Sorcerer traps Aladdin in the magic cave.

The story has frequently been retold with a number of variations. The following is a précis of the Richard Francis Burton translation of 1885, one of the more significant versions.

Aladdin is an impoverished young ne'er-do-well, dwelling in "one of the cities of Ancient China". He is recruited by a sorcerer from the Maghreb, who passes himself off as the brother of Aladdin's late father, Mustapha the tailor. The sorcerer convinces Aladdin and his mother of his good will by pretending to set up the lad as a wealthy merchant, but his real motive is to persuade young Aladdin to retrieve a wonderful oil lamp (chirag) from a booby-trapped magical cave. The sorcerer lends Aladdin a magic ring to ensure he can reach the lamp, but Aladdin discovers he can overcome the booby traps without it.

After the sorcerer attempts to double-cross him, Aladdin finds himself trapped in the cave. When he rubs his hands in despair, he inadvertently rubs the ring and a genie appears and releases him from the cave, allowing him to return to his mother while in possession of the lamp. When his mother tries to clean the lamp so they can sell it to buy food for their supper, a second, far more powerful genie appears; this one is bound to do the bidding of the person holding the lamp.

With the aid of the genie of the lamp, Aladdin becomes rich and powerful and marries Princess Badroulbadour, the sultan's daughter (after magically foiling her marriage to the vizier's son). The genie builds Aladdin and his bride a palace far more magnificent than the sultan's.

The sorcerer hears of Aladdin's good fortune, and returns. He gains possession of the lamp by tricking Aladdin's wife (who is unaware of the lamp's importance) by offering to exchange "new lamps for old". He orders the genie of the lamp to take the palace, along with all its contents, to his home in the Maghreb. Aladdin still has the magic ring and is able to summon the lesser genie. The genie of the ring is not powerful enough to directly undo any of the magic of the genie of the lamp, but he is able to transport Aladdin to the Maghreb where, with the help of the "woman's wiles" of the princess, he recovers the lamp and slays the sorcerer, returning the palace to its proper place.

The sorcerer's more powerful and evil brother plots to destroy Aladdin for killing his brother by disguising himself as an old woman known for her healing powers. Princess Badroulbadour falls for his disguise and commands the "woman" to stay in her palace in case of any illnesses. Aladdin is warned of this danger by the genie of the lamp and slays the impostor.

Aladdin eventually succeeds to his father-in-law's throne.

== Setting ==
The opening sentences of the story, in both the Galland and the Burton versions, set it in "one of the cities of China". Beyond that, nearly everything else in the rest of the story is more consistent with a Middle Eastern setting. For instance, the ruler is referred to as "Sultan" rather than "Emperor", as in some retellings, and the people in the story are Muslims and their conversation is filled with Muslim platitudes. A Jewish merchant buys Aladdin's wares, while Buddhists, Daoists, and Confucians are not mentioned.

Notably, ethnic groups in Chinese history have long included Muslim groups, including large populations of Uyghurs, and the Hui people as well as the Tajiks whose origins go back to Silk Road travelers. Islamic communities have been known to exist in the region since the Tang dynasty (which rose to power simultaneously with the prophet Muhammad's career). Some have suggested that the intended setting may be Turkestan (encompassing Central Asia and the modern-day Chinese autonomous region of Xinjiang in Western China). The Arabicized Turkic Kara-Khanid Khanate, which was located in this region and had a strong identification with China, bears a strong resemblance to the setting, their rulers even adopting the Arab title of Sultan, even going so far as to adopt the title of "Sultan of the East and China", which was used alongside Turkic titles such as Khan and Khagan; however, chancellors were referred to as Hajib rather than Vizier.

For all this, speculation about a "real" Chinese setting depends on a knowledge of China that the teller of a folk tale (as opposed to a geographic expert) might well not possess. Although the story was first recorded in French, early Arabic usage of China is known to have been used in an abstract sense to designate an exotic, far-away land.

== Badroulbadour ==
Badroulbadour / Badr ul-Badour / Badr al-Badur (Arabic: بدر البدور Badru l-Budūr, "full moon of full moons") is a princess whom Aladdin married in The Story of Aladdin; or, the Wonderful Lamp. Her name uses the full moon as a metaphor for female beauty, which is common in Arabic literature and throughout the Arabian Nights.

When Aladdin finds a magic lamp, he discovers it contains a jinni bound to do the bidding of the person holding the lamp. With the aid of the jinni, Aladdin—an impoverished young man who, in other circumstances, could not have aspired to marry a princess—becomes rich and powerful and marries Princess Badroulbadour.

In Disney's Aladdin, her name was changed to Jasmine and she was made an Arabian princess. She is also mentioned in a poem by Wallace Stevens called "The Worms at Heaven's Gate" in his book Harmonium. She is a character in the children's novel Wishing Moon by Michael O. Tunnell, and is portrayed as a scheming, black-hearted villainess.

The name Badroulbadour also appears in the novels The Good Soldier by Ford Madox Ford, and The Turmoil by Booth Tarkington (as Princess Bedrulbudour), and Come Dance with Me by Russell Hoban. Hoban also mentions Badoura as the name of an Arabian princess in The Arabian Nights. Monica Baldwin, in her novel The Called and the Chosen, uses the name Badroulbadour for the Siamese cat who belonged to her heroine, Ursula, before she became a nun.

== Motifs and variants ==
=== Tale type ===
The story of Aladdin is classified in the Aarne–Thompson–Uther Index as tale type ATU 561, "Aladdin", after the character. In the Index, the "Aladdin" story is situated next to two similar tale types: ATU 560, The Magic Ring, and ATU 562, The Spirit in the Blue Light. All of these stories deal with a down-on-his-luck and impoverished boy or soldier, who finds a magical item (ring, lamp, tinderbox) that grants his wishes. In this regard, German folklorist Hans-Jörg Uther, in his revision of the international index, published in 2004, remarked that the similarities between the three tale types make it hard to differentiate them. On the other hand, per Stith Thompson's The Folktale, in type 561, the magical item is stolen, but eventually recovered thanks to the use of another magical object. Similarly, Czech scholar Karel Horálek distinguishes the three types in that, in type 560, the hero is helped by animals (the snake gives the ring and the dog and the cat retrieve the stolen object); type 561 does away with the animals, leaving the hero to recover the stolen lamp with the second object, and, finally, type 562 inserts another person that helps the hero. Other genie in a container tales include Homer's Iliad, where the god Ares is trapped in a bronze urn and offers to grant Hermes whatever he wants if he is set free, and The Fisherman and the Jinni.

=== Distribution ===
Since its appearance in The One Thousand and One Nights, the tale has integrated into oral tradition. Scholars Ton Deker and Theo Meder located variants across Europe and the Middle East. In addition, according to scholar Kurt Ranke, in Enzyklopädie des Märchens, the "greatest distribution density" occurs in Europe and in the Mediterranean region, with variants also collected in the Middle East (Turkey, Palestine, Iraq, Yemen, Iran), Central Asia (in Tajikistan and Uzbekistan), India (among the Santal people), and in Southeast Asia (Indonesia and the Philippines).

=== Three wishes ===
The version with three wishes has become a popular variant of the tale, popularized in the 20th century in the West.

== Adaptations ==
Adaptations vary in their faithfulness to the original story. In particular, difficulties with the Chinese setting are quite often resolved by giving the story a more typical Arabian Nights background.

=== Books ===
- One of the many literary retellings of the tale appears in A Book of Wizards (1966) and A Choice of Magic (1971), by Ruth Manning-Sanders. Another is the early Penguin version for children, Aladdin and His Wonderful Lamp, illustrated by John Harwood with many Chinese details; the translator or re-teller is not acknowledged. This was a "Porpoise" imprint printed in 1947 and released in 1948.
- Aladdin: Master of the Lamp (1992), edited by Mike Resnick and Martin H. Greenberg, is an anthology containing 43 original short stories inspired by the tale.
- "The Nobility of Faith" by Jonathan Clements, in the anthology Doctor Who Short Trips: The Ghosts of Christmas (2007), is a retelling of the Aladdin story in the style of the Arabian Nights, but featuring the Doctor in the role of the genie.

=== Comics ===
==== Western comics ====
- In 1962, the Italian branch of Walt Disney Productions published the story Paperino e la grotta di Aladino (Donald and Aladdin's Cave), written by Osvaldo Pavese and drawn by Pier Lorenzo De Vita. As in many pantomimes, the plot is combined with elements of the Ali Baba story: Uncle Scrooge leads Donald Duck and their nephews on an expedition to find the treasure of Aladdin and they encounter the Middle Eastern counterparts of the Beagle Boys. Scrooge describes Aladdin as a brigand who used the legend of the lamp to cover the origins of his ill-gotten gains. They find the cave holding the treasure—blocked by a huge rock requiring a magic password ("open sesame") to open.
- The original version of the comic book character Green Lantern was partly inspired by the Aladdin myth; the protagonist discovers a "lantern-shaped power source and a 'power ring'" which gives him the power to create and control matter.
  - In the Elseworlds series, there was even a story that combined the Green Lantern mythos with that of Aladdin called Green Lantern: 1001 Emerald Nights.

==== Manga ====
- The Japanese manga series Magi: The Labyrinth of Magic is not a direct adaptation, but features Aladdin as the main character of the story and includes many characters from other One Thousand and One Nights stories. An adaptation of this comic to an anime television series was made in October 2012 in which Aladdin is voiced by Kaori Ishihara in Japanese and Erica Mendez in English.

=== Pantomimes ===
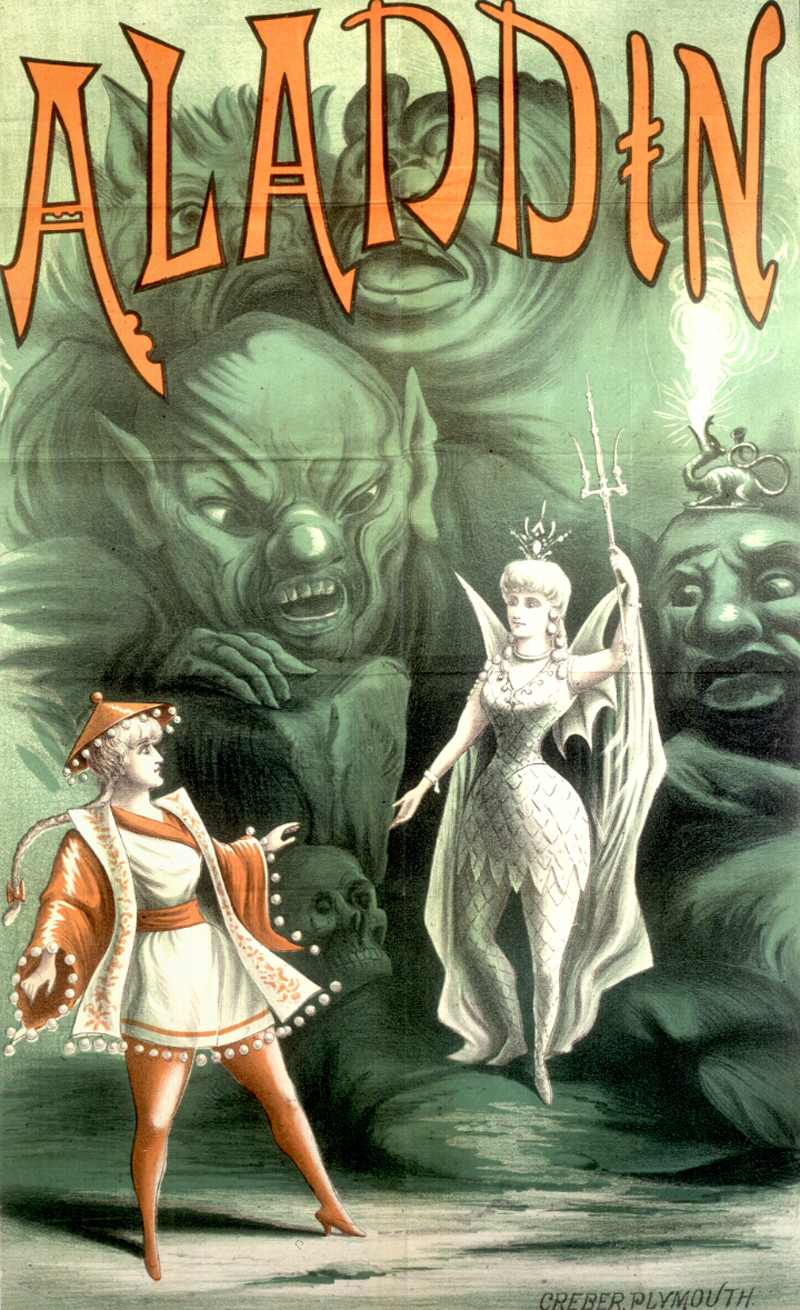
An 1886 theatre poster advertising a production of the pantomime Aladdin

- In the United Kingdom, the story of Aladdin was dramatised in 1788 by John O'Keefe for the Theatre Royal, Covent Garden. It has been a popular subject for pantomime for over 200 years.
- The traditional Aladdin pantomime is the source of the well-known pantomime character Widow Twankey (Aladdin's mother). In pantomime versions, changes in the setting and story are often made to fit it better into "China" (albeit a China situated in the East End of London rather than medieval Baghdad), and elements of other Arabian Nights tales (in particular Ali Baba) are often introduced into the plot. One version of the "pantomime Aladdin" is Sandy Wilson's musical Aladdin, from 1979.
- Since the early 1990s, Aladdin pantomimes have tended to be influenced by the Disney animation. For instance, the 2007/08 production at the Birmingham Hippodrome starring John Barrowman featured songs from the Disney movies Aladdin and Mulan.

=== Other musical theatre ===
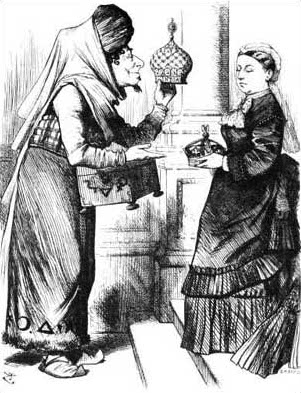
New Crowns for Old, a 19th-century British cartoon based on the Aladdin story (Disraeli as Abanazer from the pantomime version of Aladdin offering Queen Victoria an Imperial crown (of India) in exchange for a Royal one)

- The New Aladdin was a successful Edwardian musical comedy in 1906.
- Adam Oehlenschläger wrote his verse drama Aladdin in 1805. Carl Nielsen wrote incidental music for this play in 1918–19. Ferruccio Busoni set some verses from the last scene of Oehlenschläger's Aladdin in the last movement of his Piano Concerto, Op. 39.
- In 1958, a musical comedy version of Aladdin was written especially for U.S. television, with a book by S. J. Perelman and music and lyrics by Cole Porter. A London stage production followed in 1959, in which a 30-year-old Bob Monkhouse played the part of Aladdin at the Coliseum Theatre.
- Aladdin, Prince Street Players version; book by Jim Eiler, music by Jim Eiler and Jeanne Bargy, lyrics by Jim Eiler.
- Broadway Junior has released Aladdin Jr., a children's musical based on the music and screenplay of the Disney animation.
- The Disney's Aladdin: A Musical Spectacular musical stage show ran at Disney California Adventure from January 2003 to January 10, 2016.
- StarKid Productions released the musical Twisted on YouTube in 2013, a parody of the 1992 Disney film that is told from the royal vizier's point of view.
- A Disney Theatrical Production of Aladdin opened in 2011 in Seattle, in Toronto in 2013, and on Broadway at the New Amsterdam Theatre on March 20, 2014.

=== Theatrical films ===
Aladdin and the Wonderful Lamp (1917)

==== Animation: Europe and Asia ====
- The 1926 animated film The Adventures of Prince Achmed (the earliest surviving animated feature film) combined the story of Aladdin with that of the prince. In this version the princess Aladdin pursues is Achmed's sister and the sorcerer is his rival for her hand. The sorcerer steals the castle and the princess through his own magic and then sets a monster to attack Aladdin, from which Achmed rescues him. Achmed then informs Aladdin he requires the lamp to rescue his own intended wife, Princess Pari Banou, from the demons of the Island of Wak Wak. They convince the Witch of the Fiery Mountain to defeat the sorcerer, and then all three heroes join forces to battle the demons.
- A Thousand and One Nights is a 1969 Japanese adult anime feature film directed by Eiichi Yamamoto, conceived by Osamu Tezuka. The film is a first part of Mushi Production's Animerama, a series of films aimed at an adult audience.
- The animated feature Aladdin and His Magic Lamp by Film Jean Image was released in 1970 in France. The story contains many of the original elements of the story as compared to the Disney version.
- Aladdin and his Wonderful Lamp (1975), Japanese animated short film produced by Toei Animation, featured in the series Classic Tales Retold (Sekai Meisaku Dōwa Manga Shirīzu).
- Aladdin and the Magic Lamp was a rendition in Japanese directed by Yoshikatsu Kasai, produced in Japan by Toei Animation and released in the United States by The Samuel Goldwyn Company in 1982.
- Son of Aladdin is a 2003 Indian 3D-animated fantasy-adventure film by Singeetam Srinivasa Rao, produced by Pentamedia Graphics. It follows the adventures of the son of Aladdin and his fight with an evil sorcerer.

==== Animation: United States ====
- In the 1934 short film Aladdin and the Wonderful Lamp, Aladdin is a child laborer who finds a magic lamp and uses it to become a prince.
- In the 1938 animated film Have You Got Any Castles?, Aladdin makes a brief appearance asking for help but gets punched by one of the Three Musketeers.
- Aladdin and His Wonderful Lamp is a 1939 Popeye the Sailor cartoon, with Popeye portraying Aladdin and Olive Oyl playing the Princess.
- In the 1942 animated film Foney Fables, Aladdin makes another brief appearance rubbing the magic lamp, but the genie is on strike.
- The 1959 animated film 1001 Arabian Nights, starring Mr. Magoo as Aladdin's uncle and produced by UPA.
- DuckTales the Movie: Treasure of the Lost Lamp (1990) is heavily based on Aladdin, but Merlock with Scrooge McDuck, Huey, Dewey, and Louie replacing the title character.
- Aladdin is a 48-minute animated film based on the story. It was produced by Golden Films and the American Film Investment Corporation. Like all other Golden Films productions, the film featured a single song, "Rub the Lamp", written and composed by Richard Hurwitz and John Arrias. It was released direct to video on April 27, 1992, by GoodTimes Home Video (months before Disney's version was released), and was reissued on DVD in 2002 as part of the distributor's Collectible Classics line of products.
- Aladdin, the 1992 animated feature by Walt Disney Feature Animation. In this version, several characters are renamed or amalgamated. For instance, the Sorcerer and the Sultan's vizier were combined into one character named Jafar, while the Princess is renamed Jasmine. They have new motivations for their actions. The Genie of the Lamp only grants three wishes and desires freedom from his role. A sentient magic carpet replaces the ring's genie, while Jafar uses a royal magic ring to find Aladdin. The names "Jafar" and "Abu", the Sultan's delight in toys, and their physical appearances are borrowed from the 1940 film The Thief of Bagdad. The setting is moved from China to the fictional Arabian city of Agrabah, and the structure of the plot is simplified.
  - The Return of Jafar (1994), the first direct-to-video sequel to the 1992 Walt Disney movie.
  - Aladdin and the King of Thieves (1996), the direct-to-video second and final sequel to the 1992 Walt Disney movie.

==== Live-action: English language films ====
- Aladdin and the Wonderful Lamp (1917), directed by Chester M. Franklin and Sidney A. Franklin and released by the Fox Film Corporation, told the story using child actors. It is the earliest known filmed adaptation of the story.
- Arabian Nights is a 1942 adventure film directed by John Rawlins and starring Sabu, Maria Montez, Jon Hall and Leif Erickson. The film is derived from The Book of One Thousand and One Nights but owes more to the imagination of Universal Pictures than the original Arabian stories. Unlike other films in the genre (such as The Thief of Bagdad), it features no monsters or supernatural elements.
- A Thousand and One Nights (1945) is a tongue-in-cheek Technicolor fantasy film set in the Baghdad of the One Thousand and One Nights, starring Cornel Wilde as Aladdin, Evelyn Keyes as the genie of the magic lamp, Phil Silvers as Aladdin's larcenous sidekick, and Adele Jergens as the princess Aladdin loves.
- Aladdin and His Lamp is a 1952 fantasy adventure film with Johnny Sands and Patricia Medina as Aladdin and Princess Jasmine.
- The Wonders of Aladdin is a 1961 film directed by Mario Bava and Henry Levin and starring Donald O'Connor as Aladdin. This film has a more working-class focus: Aladdin helps the prince (Mario Girotti) and princess (as does a fakir) but never becomes one and ends up in a romantic relationship with his neighbor, Djalma (Noelle Adam). The genie (Vittorio De Sica) can grant only three wishes (although what constitutes as a single wish is quite malleable, probably due to his sympathies with Aladdin) and shrinks with each one, which is leading to his eternal rest after 12,000 years.
- 1001 Nights (Les 1001 nuits), a 1990 French-Italian film with Catherine Zeta-Jones, Stéphane Freiss and Vittorio Gassman, loosely based on Sherazade's and Aladdin's stories.
- The Erotic Adventures of Aladdin X, a 1994 Italian pornographic film with Christoph Clark.
- A 1998 direct-to-video film A Kid in Aladdin's Palace directed by Robert L. Levy is a sequel to A Kid in King Arthur's Court.
- Adventures of Aladdin (2019) is a mockbuster produced by The Asylum.
- Aladdin is a Disney live-action remake of the 1992 animated film, released in 2019. It stars Mena Massoud as the title character, Naomi Scott as Jasmine, Marwan Kenzari as Jafar, and Will Smith as the Genie.
- Aladdin 3477 is a trilogy of live action sci-fi films taking place 1,500 years in the future and are written and directed by Star Wars Artist Matt Busch. The first film, Aladdin 3477: The Jinn of Wisdom, was released in January 2025.

==== Live-action: non-English language films ====
- Aladdin and the Wonderful Lamp is a 1927 Indian silent film, by Bhagwati Prasad Mishra, based on the folktale.
- Alladin and the Wonderful Lamp is a 1931 Indian silent film, adapted from the folktale, by Jal Ariah.
- Aladdin Aur Jadui Chirag (Aladdin and the Wonderful Lamp) is a 1933 Indian Hindi-language fantasy-adventure film by Jal Ariah. A remake of the 1931 film in sound.
- Aaj Ka Aladdin (Today's Aladdin) is a 1935 Indian Hindi-language film by Nagendra Majumdar. It is a modern retelling of the folktale.
- Aladdin Aur Jadui Chirag (Aladdin and the Wonderful Lamp) is a 1937 Indian Hindi-language film adaptation by Navinchandra.
- Aladdin Aur Jadui Chirag (Aladdin and the Wonderful Lamp) is a 1952 Indian Hindi-language musical fantasy-adventure film by Homi Wadia, starring Mahipal as Aladdin and Meena Kumari as Princess Badar.
- Alif-Laila is a 1955 Indian Hindi-language fantasy film by K. Amarnath, Vijay Kumar portrays the character of Aladdin with actress Nimmi as the female genie.
- Chirag-e-Cheen (Lamp of China) is a 1955 Indian Hindi-language film adaptation by G.P. Pawar and C. M. Trivedi.
- Alladin Ka Beta (Son of Alladin) is a 1955 Indian Hindi-language action film, it follows the story of the son of Alladin.
- Alladin and the Wonderful Lamp is a 1957 Indian fantasy film by T. R. Raghunath. Based on the story of Aladdin, it was simultaneously filmed in Telugu, Tamil and Hindi with Akkineni Nageshwara Rao portraying the title character.
- Alladdin Laila is a 1957 Indian Hindi-language film by Lekhraj Bhakri, starring Mahipal, Lalita Pawar and Shakila.
- Sindbad Alibaba and Aladdin is a 1965 Indian Hindi-language musical fantasy-adventure film by Prem Narayan Arora. It features the three most popular characters from the Arabian Nights. Very loosely based on the original, in which the heroes get to meet and share in each other's adventures. In this version, the lamp's jinni (genie) is female and Aladdin marries her rather than the princess (she becomes a mortal woman for his sake).
- Main Hoon Aladdin (I am Aladdin) is a 1965 Indian Hindi-language film by Mohammed Hussain, starring Ajit in the title role.
- A Soviet film Volshebnaia Lampa Aladdina ("Aladdin's Magic Lamp") was released in 1966.
- A Mexican production, Pepito y la Lampara Maravillosa was made en 1972, where comedian Chabelo plays the role of the genie who grant wishes to a young kid called Pepito in 1970s Mexico City.
- Adventures of Aladdin is a 1978 Indian Hindi-language adventure-film based on the tale, by Homi Wadia.
- Allauddinum Albhutha Vilakkum (Aladdin and the Magic Lamp) is a 1979 Indian adventure fantasy-drama film by I. V. Sasi. It was simultaneously filmed in Malayalam and Tamil with Kamal Haasan in the title role.
- In 1986, an Italian production (under supervision of Golan-Globus) of a modern-day Aladdin was filmed in Miami under the title Aladdin, starring actor Bud Spencer as the genie and his daughter Diamante as the daughter of a police sergeant.
- Aladin is a 2009 Indian Hindi-language fantasy action film directed by Sujoy Ghosh. The film stars Ritesh Deshmukh in the title role, along with Amitabh Bachchan, Jacqueline Fernandez and Sanjay Dutt.
- The New Adventures of Aladdin, France modern retelling of the tale of Aladdin.
  - Alad'2, second sequel to the French movie The New Adventures of Aladdin (2018).
- Ashchorjyo Prodeep is a 2013 Indian Bengali-language film by Anik Dutta. This film is based on a Shirshendu Mukhopadhyay novel of the same name and deals with the issues of consumerism. It is a modern adaptation of Aladdin about the story of a middle-class man (played by Saswata Chatterjee) who accidentally finds a magic lamp containing a Jinn (played by Rajatava Dutta).
- Aladin Saha Puduma Pahana was released in 2018 in Sri Lanka in Sinhala language.
- In the 2020 Japanese live action series Kamen Rider Saber, this story is adapted into a "Wonder Ride Book" named "Lamp Do Alangina", which is the main Wonder Ride Book of Kamen Rider Espada.

=== Television ===
==== Animation: English language ====
- The Arabian Nights, episode of the Rankin/Bass series Festival of Family Classics (1972–1973), inspired by different tales of the collection, also including Aladdin.
- Grinder Genie and the Magic Lamp (1987), episode of Sanrio and DIC series Hello Kitty's Furry Tale Theater.
- "Aladdin and the Magic Lamp", an episode of Rabbit Ears Productions' We All Have Tales series, televised on PBS in 1991, featuring John Hurt as narrator, with illustrations by Greg Couch and music by Mickey Hart. This version is set in Isfahan, Persia, and closely follows the original plot, including the origin of the sorcerer. The audiobook version was nominated for a Grammy Award for Best Spoken Word Album for Children in 1994.
- Scooby-Doo! in Arabian Nights (1994) featured a segment called Aliyah-Din and the Magic Lamp, which was a reverse gender telling of the tale, with Aliyah-Din being a female counterpart to Aladdin hoping to wed a prince. Yogi Bear and Boo Boo played genies.
- Aladdin, an animated series produced by Disney based on their movie adaptation that ran from 1994 to 1995.
- Aladdin featured in an episode of Happily Ever After: Fairy Tales for Every Child. The story was set in "Ancient China", but otherwise had a tenuous connection with the original plot.

==== Animation: non-English language ====
- An elderly version of Aladdin appears as a protagonist in the 1975 animated series Arabian Nights: Sinbad's Adventures. Furthermore, the same story is adapted in episodes 14–16.
- Animated series Manga Sekai Mukashi Banashi (1976–1979) features a ten-minute adaptation in episode 37.
- An episode of French animated series Les Mille et Une Nuits (1993).
- Pekkle - Aladdin and His Magic Lamp (1993), an episode of OVA series Hello Kitty and Friends.
- World Fairy Tale Series (Sekai meisaku dōwa shirīzu - Wa-o! Meruhen ōkoku), animated series produced by Toei Animation based on classic tales. Episode 1 is an adaptation of Aladdin.
- Episode of 2001 series Hello Kitty's Animation Theater (Sanrio Anime Sekai Meisaku Gekijō).
- Episode 15 of the third season of the German animated series Simsala Grimm (1999–2010).
- Magi: The Labyrinth of Magic (2012), adaptation of the eponymous manga.

==== Live-action: English language ====
- Aladdin is a 1958 musical fantasy written especially for television with a book by S.J. Perelman and music and lyrics by Cole Porter, telecast in color on the DuPont Show of the Month by CBS.
- Aladdin appeared in episode 297 of Sesame Street performed by Frank Oz. This version was made from a large lavender live-hand Anything Muppet.
- A segment of the Marty Feldman episode of The Muppet Show retells the story of Aladdin with The Great Gonzo in the role of Aladdin and Marty Feldman playing the genie of the lamp.
- A 1967 TV movie was based on the Prince Street Players stage musical. This version is very close to the touring musical with about 15 minutes cut to be adapted into the 50 minutes TV program. It had Will B. Able as the Genii and Fred Grades as Aladdin.
- In 1986, the program Faerie Tale Theatre based an episode on the story called "Aladdin and His Wonderful Lamp", directed by Tim Burton and starring Robert Carradine as Aladdin and James Earl Jones as both the ring Genie and the lamp Genie.
- In 1990 Disney made a direct to TV movie based on the Prince Street Players stage musical, starring Barry Bostwick.
- Aladdin features as one of five stories in the Hallmark Entertainment TV miniseries Arabian Nights in 2000, featuring Jason Scott Lee as Aladdin and John Leguizamo as both of the genies.
- The characters of Aladdin, Jasmine, Jafar and the Sultan, along with Agrabah as the setting and the genie of the lamp were adapted into the sixth season of TV series Once Upon a Time, with Aladdin portrayed by Deniz Akdeniz, Jasmine portrayed by Karen David, and Jafar portrayed by Oded Fehr. Jafar previously appeared in the spin-off Once Upon a Time in Wonderland, portrayed by Naveen Andrews. Both were produced by ABC Television Studios and based on the Disney version of the story.

==== Live-action: non-English language ====
- In Kyōryū Sentai Zyuranger, the sixteenth installment of the long-running Super Sentai metaseries, the Djinn (voiced by Eisuke Yoda) that appears in the eleventh episode ("My Master!" Transcription: "Goshujin-sama!" (Japanese: ご主人さま!)) reveals that he was the genie from the tale of "Aladdin and the Magic Lamp", which did take place.
- The story of Aladdin was featured in Alif Laila, an Indian TV series directed by Ramanand Sagar in 1994 and telecasted on DD National.
- Aladdin – Jaanbaaz Ek Jalwe Anek (2007–2009), an Indian fantasy television series based on the story of Aladdin that aired on Zee TV, starring Mandar Jadhav in the title role of Aladdin.
- Aladdin - Naam Toh Suna Hoga (2018–2021), a live-action Indian fantasy television show on SAB TV starring Siddharth Nigam as Aladdin and Avneet Kaur/Ashi Singh as Yasmine.It was earlier a loose adaptation of the Disney series, but later turned over to newer story arcs.

=== Video games ===
- A number of video games were based on the Disney animated film:
  - The Genesis version (also on Amiga, MS-DOS, NES, Game Boy, and Game Boy Color) by Virgin Games.
  - The SNES version (also on Game Boy Advance) by Capcom.
  - The Master System version (also on Game Gear) by SIMS.
  - Disney's Aladdin in Nasira's Revenge for the PlayStation and Windows by Argonaut Games.
  - The Disney version of Aladdin appears throughout the Disney/Square Enix crossover series Kingdom Hearts, with Agrabah being a visitable world.
- Sonic and the Secret Rings is heavily based on the story of Aladdin, and both genies appear in the story. The genie of the lamp is the main antagonist, known in the game as the Erazor Djinn, and the genie of the ring, known in the game as Shahra, appears as Sonic's sidekick and guide through the game. Furthermore, the ring genie is notably lesser than the lamp genie in the story.
- In 2010, Anuman Interactive launched Aladin and the Enchanted Lamp, a hidden object game on PC and Mac.
- In 2016, Saturn Animation Studio produced an interactive adaptation of The Magical Lamp of Aladdin for mobile devices.

=== Pachinko ===
Sega Sammy have released a line of pachinko machines based on Aladdin since 1989. Sega Sammy have sold over 570,000 Aladdin pachinko machines in Japan, as of 2017. At an average price of about $5,000, this is equivalent to approximately $2.85 billion in pachinko sales revenue.

== Gallery ==
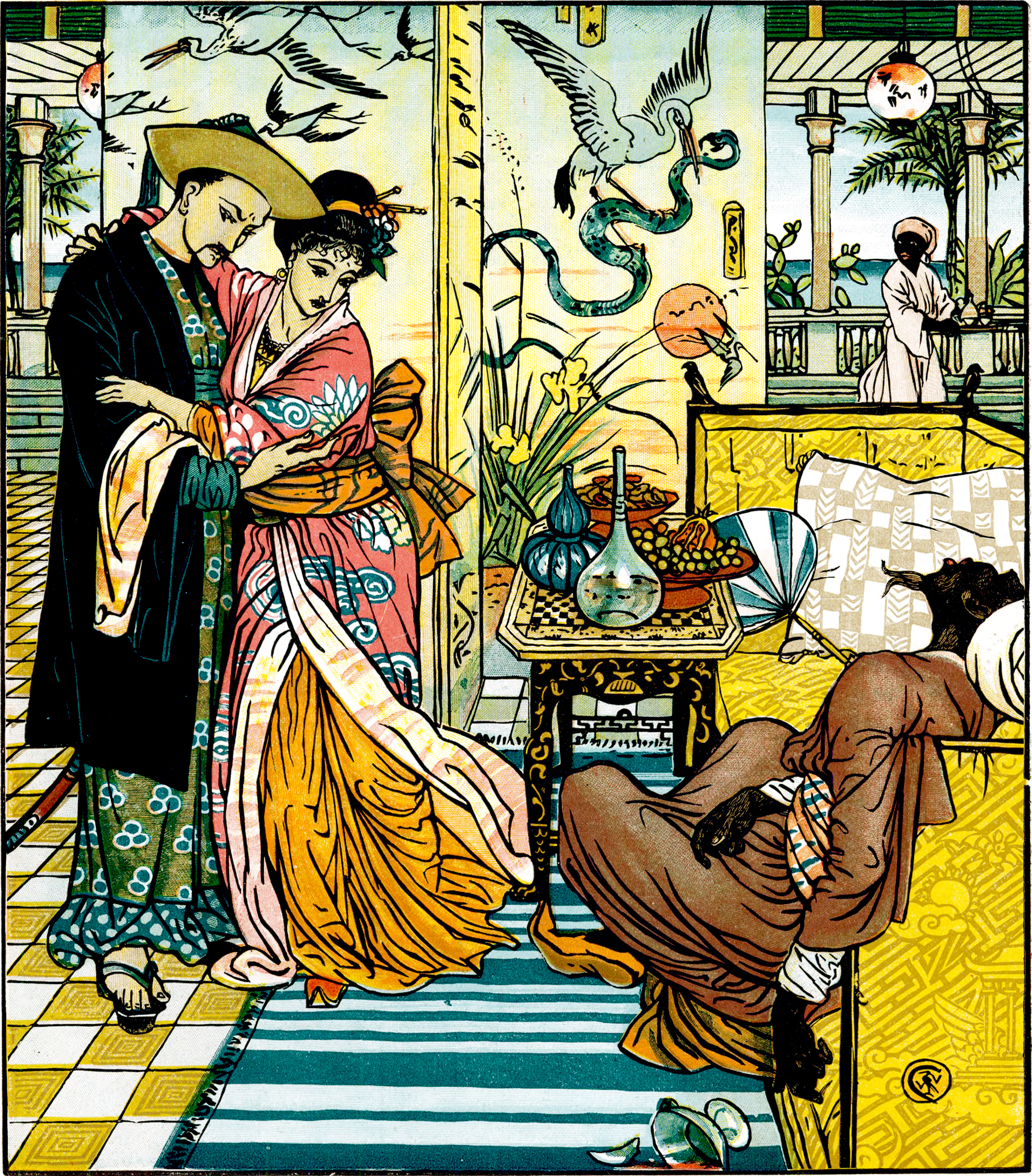
Aladdin saving his wife from the evil sorcerer

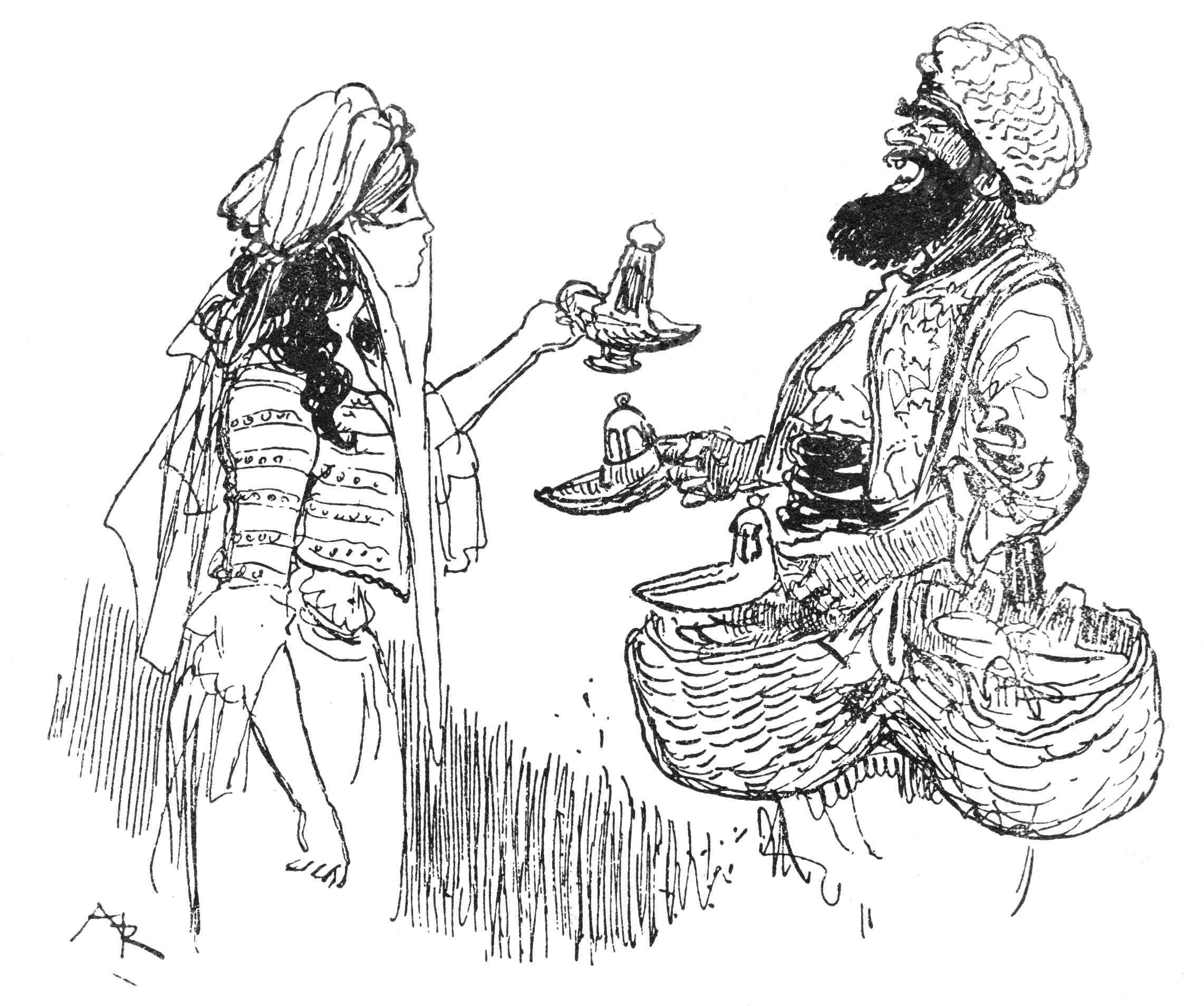
The sorcerer tricks a handmaiden and offers "new lamps for old lamps".

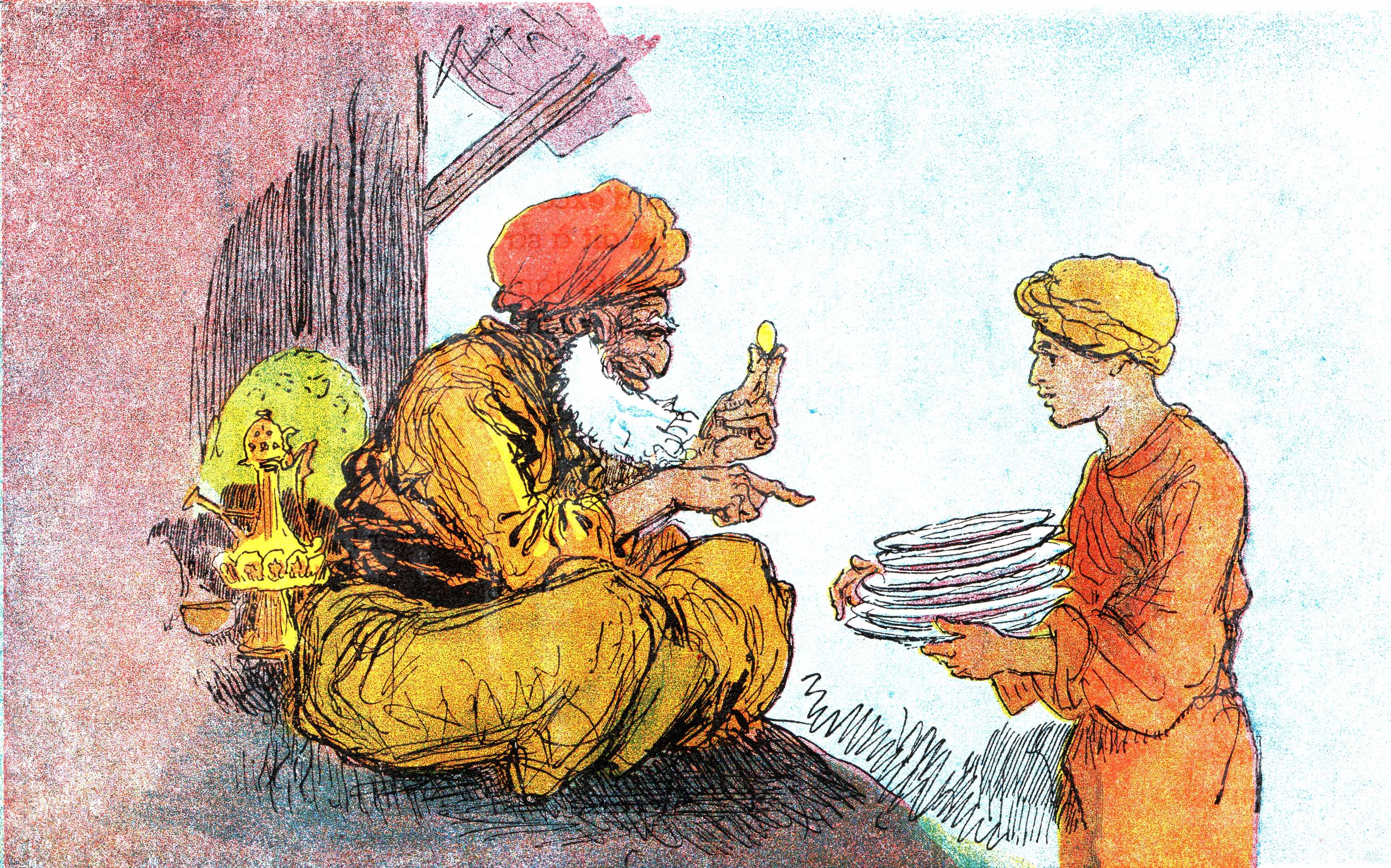
Aladdin trades the silver plates to a Jew for a piece of gold.

== See also ==
- 54521 Aladdin, asteroid
- Arabian mythology, source of the djinn (genie)
- Genies in popular culture
- "The Bronze Ring", second story in One Thousand and One Nights
- "The Fisherman and the Jinni"
- "Jack and His Golden Snuff-Box", Romani fairy tale (recorded by Joseph Jacobs) involving a magical object
- "The Tinderbox", Hans Christian Andersen fairy tale involving a magical object
- "The Blue Light", Grimm fairy tale involving a magical object
- Three wishes
- Old Khottabych, Soviet film with similar themes

== Bibliography ==
- Allen, Roger (2005). The Arabic Literary Heritage: The Development of Its Genres and Criticism. Cambridge University Press. ISBN 978-0-521-48525-8.
- Burton, Sir Richard (2009). Aladdin and the Magic Lamp. Digireads.com Publishing. ISBN 978-1-4209-3193-8.
- Dobie, Madeleine (2008). "Translation in the contact zone: Antoine Galland's Mille et une nuits: contes arabes". In Makdisi, S.; Nussbaum, F. (eds.). The Arabian Nights in Historical Context. Oxford University Press. ISBN 978-0-19-955415-7.
- El-Shamy, Hasan (2004). "The Oral Connections of the Arabian Nights". The Arabian Nights Encyclopedia. ABC-CLIO. ISBN 978-1-57607-204-2.
- Honour, Hugh (1973). Chinoiserie: The Vision of Cathay. Ican. ISBN 978-0-06-430039-1.
- Horta, Paulo Lemos (2018). "Introduction". Aladdin: A New Translation. Translated by Seale Y. Liveright Publishing. pp. 8–10. ISBN 978-1-63149-517-5.
- Irwin, Robert (2004). Arabian Nights, The: A Companion. Tauris Parke Paperbacks. ISBN 1-86064-983-1.
- Littman (1986). "Alf Layla wa Layla". Encyclopedia of Islam (2nd ed.). Brill.
- Mahdi, Muhsin (1994). The Thousand and One Nights Part 3. Brill. ISBN 90-04-10106-3.
- Moon, Krystyn (2005). Yellowface. Rutgers University Press. p. 23. ISBN 0-8135-3507-7.
- Payne, John (1901). Aladdin and the Enchanted Lamp and Other Stories. London.
- Plotz, Judith Ann (2001). Romanticism and the vocation of childhood. Palgrave Macmillan. ISBN 0-312-22735-3.
- "Who 'wrote' Aladdin? The Forgotten Syrian Storyteller". Ajam Media Collective. 14 September 2017.
- Witchard, Anne Veronica (2017). Thomas Burke's Dark Chinoiserie. Routledge. ISBN 978-0-7546-5864-1.
