= Laxmi Narayan (film) =

1951 film by Nanabhai Bhatt

- Directed by: Nanabhai Bhatt
- Starring: Meena Kumari, Mahipal
- Music by: S.N. Tripathi
- Distributed by: Vasant Pictures
- Release date: 1951
- Country: India
- Language: Hindi

Laxmi Narayan is a 1951 Hindu mythological film directed by Nanabhai Bhatt starring Meena Kumari and Mahipal in lead roles. Meena Kumari, after her career as a child artist, started doing adult roles as heroines in mythological and fantasy films before she made it in mainstream cinema with Baiju Bawra (1952).

== Cast ==
Male Cast

- Mahipal as Narayan
- S. N. Tripathi
- Babu Raje
- Dalpat
- Shribhagwan
- Banke Bihari

Male cast (continued)

- Brijmohan Vyas
- Amarnath
- Agha Shapur
- Gadadhar Sharma
- Kamal Kumar
- Korega
- Vasantrao Pahalwan

Female Cast

- Meena Kumari as Laxmi
- Kanta Kumari
- Urmila
- Leela Kumari
- Chandni
- Lalita Rao
- Sulochana
