= Alibaba Aur 40 Chor (1954 film) =

1954 fantasy action film

Alibaba And 40 Thieves
- 1954 poster
- Directed by: Homi Wadia
- Written by: J. B. H. Wadia
- Screenplay by: J. B. H. Wadia
- Story by: J. B. H. Wadia
- Based on: Arabian Nights
- Produced by: Wadia Brothers Production
- Starring: Mahipal; Shakila
- Cinematography: Anant Wadadeker
- Edited by: Kamlaker
- Music by: S. N. Tripathi; Chitragupta
- Production company: Basant Studios
- Release date: 1954
- Running time: 145 min
- Country: India
- Language: Hindi

Alibaba and 40 Thieves (Hindi: अलीबाबा और चालीस चोर, romanized: Alibaba Aur 40 Chor ) is a 1954 Hindi fantasy action film directed by Homi Wadia. The film was a Basant pictures presentation under the Wadia Brothers Production banner. The story, screenplay and additional dialogue were by J. B. H. Wadia, while the dialogues were written by Chand Pandit and Tahir Lucknavi. The art direction and special effects were by Babubhai Mistry. The music was composed by Chitragupta and S. N. Tripathi. Chitragupta had worked as an assistant to S. N. Tripathi in some of the mythology and fantasy films before branching out on his own. The lyricist was Raja Mehdi Ali Khan. It stars Mahipal, Shakila in the lead roles, with S. N. Tripathi, B. M. Vyas, Sharda, Lalita Kumari and Helen.

The film based on the Arabian Nights fantasy adventure follows the story of Alibaba finding the cave filled with treasure and his escapades thereafter. Homi Wadia rebooted this film as Alibaba Aur 40 Chor, with lead protagonist as Sanjeev Kumar, while continuing B. M. Vyas as the main antagonist from this film. The songs from the movie went on to be used in the 1956 Tamil adaptation.

== Plot ==
Alibaba and his brother are out with their donkeys when one donkey runs away and Alibaba follows looking for him. Hiding behind a stone he sees forty thieves ride up to a hillside and the chief saying "Khul Ja Sim Sim" (Open Sesame) and a cave door opening. He later goes back there and returns a rich man. The jealousy of Alibaba's brother's wife lands her husband in trouble with his head being cut off. Marjina, Alibaba's beloved finds a tailor who sews him back. The thieves find out about Alibaba and meet him under false pretenses. He invites them home where Marjina finds out the chief's strategy of pretending to be a merchant. She gets the 40 vats he's brought to hide the thieves in thrown down the hill. Finally Alibaba is free of the thieves and lives amicably with his brother and family.

== Cast ==
- Mahipal as Alibaba
- Shakila as Marjina
- B. M. Vyas as Abu Hassan
- S. N. Tripathi as Qasim Khan
- Sharda as Sitara
- Maruti Rao as Abu
- Lalita Kumari as Fatima Begum
- Shalini as Salma
- Sardar Mansoor
- Dalpat
- Shri Bhagwan
- Shapoor Aga
- Helen as Dancer

== Music ==
The music direction was by S. N. Tripathi and Chitragupta who had started out as a composer by assisting Tripathi. Together they gave 'folk-based' music with some classical input by Tripathi. The songs were sung by Asha Bhosle, Mohammed Rafi and Shamshad Begum. Lyrics written by Raja Mehdi Ali Khan.

=== Song list ===
Song	Singer
"Aankh Mili Hai, Pyar Hoga"	Shamshad Begum
"Zara Nazren Mila Lo"	Shamshad Begum
"Chalo Chalo, Chalen Hum Babool Ke Tale"	Shamshad Begum, Mohammed Rafi
"Dekho Dekho Huzoor, Yeh Hai Khatte Angoor"	Shamshad Begum, Mohammed Rafi
"Siye Ja, Siye Ja, Siye Ja"	Mohammed Rafi
"Ae Saba, Unse Keh Zara, Ke Hamen Bekarar Kar Diya"	Mohammed Rafi, Asha Bhosle
"Dekho Ji Chand Nikla"	Asha Bhosle
"Sharmake Lajake"	Asha Bhosle
