= Veer Ghatotkach =

- Directed by: Nanabhai Bhatt
- Starring: Meena Kumari, Shahu Modak, Mishra, Indravadan Mehta
- Music by: Shrinath Tripathi
- Release date: 1949
- Country: India
- Language: Hindi

Veer Ghatotkach also known as Surekha Haran is a 1949 Hindi Indian mythological film, starring Meena Kumari, Shahu Modak, Sumiti Gupta, Vasant Pahelwan, Naranjan Sharma and S. N. Tripathi. Meena Kumari, after her career as a child artist, started doing adult roles as heroines in mythologicals and fantasy genres before she made it in mainstream cinema with Baiju Bawra (1952). It's an adaptation of the Maya Bazar story from Mahabharata, but from the perspective of Ghatotkach.

== Storyline ==
While hiding from their vengeful cousins, the Kauravas, the Pandava brothers, Yudhister, Arjun, Bhim, Nakul, and Sahdev enter a forest, and this is where Bhim slays a demon. In order to make amends to the demon's mother, he agrees to marry her daughter, Hidamba, and they subsequently return home. Hidamba gets pregnant and gives birth to a baby boy who she names Ghatotkach, who grows up to be a mighty illusionist, who can fly, became a giant at will, and shape-shift. One day Ghatotkach gets into a confrontation, albeit unknowingly, with Abhimanyu, the son of Arjun, who is on his way to abduct Surekha, the daughter of Balram, who is being married against her will to Lakshman, the semi-senile son of Duryodhan, and ends up killing him. When he finds out that Abhimanyu is his cousin, he brings him back to life with Amrit (Holy Nectar), and decides to join him in his quest. The duo do get away with irritating the Kauravas, almost resulting in a battle between the Yadavs and them, but Krishna intercedes and placates both parties. With Krishna involved, will they succeed in abducting Surekha?

== Remakes ==
It was remade in 1970 directed by Shantilal Soni. It was made from Krishna's perspective as Maya Bazar in 1958 starring Mahipal as Krishna and again remade in 1984, both being directed by Babubhai Mistry.

== Soundtrack ==
Track #	Song	Singer(s)	Lyrics	Composer
1	"Aao Sakhi Mangal Gao Ki Shubh Din Aaye Ri"	Saroj, Shanti Sharma	Ramesh Joshi	Shrinath Tripathi
2	"Ek Naya Sansar Sajao"	Yashwant Bhatt, Rohini Roy	Ramesh Joshi	Shrinath Tripathi
3	"Kaha Chali O Brij Ki Bala"	Rohini Roy, Mohantara Talpade	Moti	Shrinath Tripathi
4	"Karman Ki Gati Nyari Jag Me"		Saraswati Kumar Deepak	Shrinath Tripathi
5	"Mausam Salona Muskaya Mehman Hamare Ghar Aaya"	Saroj, Shanti Sharma	Ramesh Joshi	Shrinath Tripathi
6	"Mere Daras Diwane Nain Re"	Saroj, Shanti Sharma	Moti	Shrinath Tripathi
7	"Pehli Hi Pehchan Me Naina Naino Ke Mehman Bane"	Mohantara Talpade	Anjum Rehmani	Shrinath Tripathi
8	"Sandesh Mera Pa Ke Mujhe Daras Dikhana"	Mohantara Talpade	Anjum Rehmani	Shrinath Tripathi
9	"Gori Ankhiya Se Ankhiya Milao"	Shanti Sharma, Saroj	Anjum Rehmani	Moti
