= Shri Ganesh Mahima =

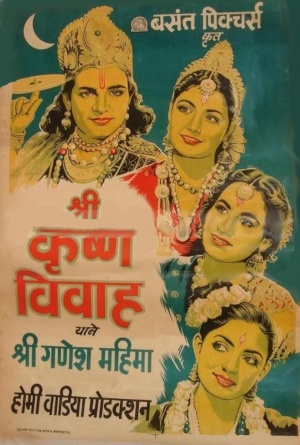
- Directed by: Homi Wadia
- Screenplay by: Homi Wadia
- Produced by: Homi Wadia
- Starring: Meena Kumari; Mahipal; S. N. Tripathi
- Music by: S. N. Tripathi
- Production company: Basant Pictures
- Release date: 1950
- Country: India
- Language: Hindi

Shri Ganesh Mahima also called Shri Krishna Vivah is a 1950 Hindi mythological film directed by Homi Wadia. The film was made under Wadia's Basant Pictures Banner with music composed by S. N. Tripathi. Meena Kumari, after her career as a child artist, started doing adult roles as heroines in mythologicals and fantasy genres before she made it in mainstream cinema with Baiju Bawra (1952). The cast included Meena Kumari, Mahipal, S. N. Tripathi, Amarnath and Dalpat. It is a side story and indirect sequel to Hanuman Patal Vijay.

== Plot ==
Ganesha curses Chandra (Moon) for his vanity when he laughs at him. On asking forgiveness the curse is changed so that the effect occurs only on the auspicious day of Ganesh Chaturthi. Anyone looking at the Moon will fall prey to false charges. Lord Krishna (Mahipal) looks at the Moon and is accused of having stolen the Syamantaka Mani by Satrajit whose daughter Satyabhama (Meena Kumari) is keen on marrying Krishna. The film follows the fight between Lord Krishna and Jambavan for twenty-one days, with the recovery of the jewel and his marriage to Satyabhama.

== Cast ==
- Meena Kumari as Satyabhama
- Mahipal as Lord Krishna
- S. N. Tripathi
- Indira Billi
- Moolchand
- Vimal
- Mangala
- Dalpat
- Amarnath

== Box-Office ==
The film did not strictly adhere to the telling of Ganesha's story from the classics but focused on a particular incident covering Lord Krishna. It attracted media publicity and became successful at the box-office "breaking box-office records".

== Remakes ==
It was remade in Telugu as Vinayaka Chavithi 1957 with NTR playing his iconic role, character of Krishna and in Hindi once again as Shree Ganesh in 1962 by Babubhai Mistry, with Mahipal reprising his iconic role as Lord Krishna, the actor who had played Satrajit, also reprised his role. The song Surya Dev Dinesh Hai, which played during Satrajit worship of Lord Surya was reused in that movie. In both remakes, Krishna Kumari starred as Rukmini.Ot was remade again in 1977 as Jai Dwarkadheesh, by Sushil Gupta, to serve as sequel to prequel remake Hanuman Vijay which also retained ensemble same cast, starring Ashish Kumar, Kanan Kaushal, Radha Saluja, Jayshree T, Manher Desai, Anita Guha, Hercules, B M Vyas, Bharat Bhushan, S.N.Tripati.

Director: .

== Music ==
The film had music directed by S. N. Tripathi and lyrics by Ramesh Pandey. The main singers were Mohammed Rafi and Geeta Dutt.

=== Song list ===
#	Title	Singer(s)
1	"Kartab Hai Balwan Jagat Me"	Mohammed Rafi
2	"O Mohan Murli Wale Rakho Laz Hamari"	Geeta Dutt
3	"Gaayiye Ganpati Jag"	
4	"Rahe Asha Ke Geet"	
5	"Soorya Dev Dinesh Hai"	
6	"Hey Ganesh Jai Ganesh"	
7	"Mere Naino Me Preet"	Geeta Dutt
8	"Sakhi Ri Mera Man Nache Mera Tan Nache"	Geeta Dutt
9	"Taro Ke Paalne Me Jhule Chand Hamara"	Geeta Dutt
10	"Man Mohan Raas Rachayo"	
11	"Shambho Mahadeva"	
