= Nazrana =

Nazrana may refer to:

- Nazrana (1942 film), an Indian film
- Nazrana (1961 film), an Indian film
- Nazrana (1987 film), an Indian film
