= Shararat =

Shararat in Hindi-Urdu means "mischief". It may refer to:

- Shararat (1944 film), 1944 Indian Hindi-language film directed by Kishore Sahu
- Shararat (1959 film), 1959 Indian Hindi-language film directed by H. S. Rawail and starring Raaj Kumar, Kishore Kumar and Meena Kumari
- Shararat (1972 film), 1972 Indian Hindi-language film directed by Manmohan Desai, starring Biswajeet and Mumtaz
- Shararat (1990 film), 1990 Indian Hindi-language film starring Rakesh Roshan
- Shararat (2002 film), 2002 Indian Hindi-language film starring Abhishek Bachchan and Hrishitaa Bhatt
- Shararat (2003 film), 2003 Pakistani Urdu-language film starring Mehr Hassan and Moammar Rana
- Shararat (TV series), Indian Hindi language fantasy sitcom
- "Shararat", a song by Shashwat Sachdev, Jasmine Sandlas and Madhubanti Bagchi from the 2025 Indian film Dhurandhar
