= Muqabla =

Muqabla (lit. 'competition') may refer to:

- Muqabla (1993 film), a 1993 Hindi film directed by T. Rama Rao
- Muqabla (1979 film), a 1979 Hindi action film directed by Rajkumar Kohli

== See also ==
- Muqabala, a 1942 Bollywood action drama film directed by Batuk Bhatt and Babubhai Mistri
- "Mukkala Mukkabla" (or simply "Mukkabla"), a song by A. R. Rahman, Mano and Swarnalatha from the 1994 Indian film Kadhalan
