= Baba Ramdev (film) =

- Poster
- Directed by: Nawal Mathur; Manibhai Vyas
- Written by: Nawal Mathur
- Produced by: Ramraj Nahata
- Starring: Mahipal; Anita Guha; Ratna; Deepak; Madhumati
- Narrated by: Nawal Mathur
- Cinematography: Narottam
- Edited by: I M Kunu
- Music by: Pandit Shivram
- Production company: Ranglok
- Release date: 1963
- Running time: 144 minutes
- Country: India
- Language: Rajasthani

Baba Ramdev is a 1963 Rajasthani language devotional feature film directed by Nawal Mathur and Manibhai Vyas, and based on the life of the Hindu folk deity Ramdev Pir.

== Background ==
The film was made in the 1960s and became a big commercial success, being considered a hit for Rajasthani cinema. This was a milestone in the history of the Rajasthani movie industry.

=== Re-release ===
88 Rajasthani films had been produced in the period of mid-1942 to 2004. With the emergence of VCD and DVD technology, films which had otherwise been unavailable for years have become marketable and are being re-released in video format. Baba Ramdev was re-released by 'Modern Videos of Ajmer'.

== Cast ==
- Mahipal
- Anita Guha
- Ratna Bhushan
- Deepak
- Madhumati
- Dalda
- Sarita
- Lalita Desai
- B.M. Vyas
- Mohan Modi
