= Sant Ravidas Ki Amar Kahani =

- VCD Cover
- Directed by: Babubhai Mistri
- Starring: Ashish Kumar (actor); B M Vyas; Mahipal; Rajendra Nath; Tun Tun; Mohan Choti; Shekhar Purohit
- Music by: Chitragupt
- Release date: 1 January 1983
- Country: India
- Language: Hindi

Sant Ravidas Ki Amar Kahani is a 1983 Indian devotional movie based on renowned saint Ravidas, directed by Babubhai Mistri, with music by Chitragupt. Ravidas (also Raidas, Rohidas and Ruhidas in eastern India) was a North Indian Sant mystic of the bhakti movement who was active in the 15th century CE. Venerated in regions including Punjab, Uttar Pradesh as well as the Indian state of Maharashtra, his devotional songs and verses made a lasting impact upon the bhakti movement. He is often given the honorific "Bhagat" or "Sant". This film was released on 1 January 1983 in the Hindi language.

== Plot ==
A shoemaker of the Chamar caste, all of his devotional songs were preserved included in the Sikh holy book, the Adi Granth, by the fifth Sikh Guru, Guru Arjan Dev. There is also a larger body of hymns passed on independently that is claimed and attributed by some to Ravidas ji. Ravidas was subversive in that his devotionalism implied a levelling of the social divisions of caste and gender, yet ecumenical in that it tended to promote the crossing of sectarian divides in the name of a higher spiritual unity.[3] He taught that one is distinguished not by one's caste (jāti) but by one's actions (karma) and that every person has the right to worship God and read holy texts.

== Soundtrack ==
Track	Song	Singer(s)	Duration
1	"Man Changa To"	Manna Dey	3:04
2	"Shyam Salone Samne Aao"	Usha Mangeshkar, K. J. Yesudas	4:08
3	"Ab Kaise Chhoote Ram Nam"	Manna Dey	3:22
4	"Aisi Lal Tujh Bin"	Manna Dey	3:26
5	"Jab Se Moher"	Usha Mangeshkar	3:26
6	"Jab Tak Hai Aakash Pe"	Jaspal Singh	3:24
7	"Naam Tero Aarti"	Manna Dey	2:25
8	"Sachche Hi Sada"	K.J. Yesudas, Aarti Mukherjee	3:39
