= Hanuman Patal Vijay =

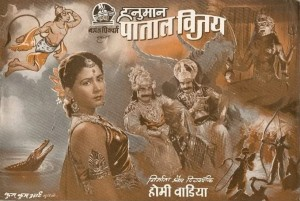
- Directed by: Homi Wadia
- Screenplay by: Homi Wadia
- Produced by: Homi Wadia
- Starring: Meena Kumari; Mahipal; S. N. Tripathi
- Music by: S. N. Tripathi
- Production company: Basant Pictures
- Release date: 1951
- Running time: 139 min
- Country: India
- Language: Hindi

Hanuman Patal Vijay (Hindi: हनुमान पाताल विजय, "Hanuman's Victory Over Hell") is a 1951 Hindi mythological film directed by Homi Wadia for his Basant Pictures banner. Meena Kumari starred in this devotional film with S. N. Tripathi playing Hanuman. Following her career as a child actress, Meena Kumari did heroine roles in mythologies made by Basant Pictures and directed by Homi Wadia. She had an extremely successful career for some years playing goddesses before her big commercial break in Baiju Bawra (1951). S. N. Tripathi, besides acting in the film, also composed the music. His costars were Meena Kumari, Mahipal, Niranjan Sharma, Dalpat and Amarnath.

The story was about Hanuman's devotion to Ram and his battle with the two demon brothers Ahiravan and Mahiravan.

== Plot ==
The story is about Hanuman and his confrontations with The King of Patal, Ahiravan, and his brother Mahiravan, who have been asked by Ravan to kill Ram and Lakshman. Mahiravana kidnaps Naga princess chandrasena who is devoted to Rama. The film follows Hanuman's encounter with Makari, the daughter of the sea, who wants to marry him, but instead through the swallowing of a bead of his sweat she gives birth to Makardhwaj who guards the gates of Patal (Hell) where Ram and Lakshman are taken when kidnapped. Hanuman gets the better of Makardhwaj and rescues Ram and Lakshman. A major battle ensues and Ahiravan and Mahiravan are killed, but somehow they keep regenerating. Hanuman manages to find out the secret of their regeneration and puts a stop to it with the help of Ahiravan's wife Chandrasena. In the end, Rama tells Chandrasena that he will marry her in Dvapara Yuga when he will incarnate as Krishna and marry her as satyabhama.

== Cast ==
- Meena Kumari
- Mahipal
- S. N. Tripathi
- Shanta Kunwar
- Vimal
- Dalpat
- H. Prakash
- Kanta Kumar
- Niranjan Sharma
- Bimla
- Amarnath

== Music ==
Songlist.

| # | Title | Singer |
|---|---|---|
| 1 | "Kyun Ruth Gaye Mujhse" | Geeta Dutt |
| 2 | "He Ambe Jagdambe Chandi" | |
| 3 | "Gori Ankhiyon Se Ankhiyan Milao" | |
| 4 | "Hey Shankar Pralaykar" | Mohammed Rafi |
| 5 | "Kahe Bhatakta Phirta Man" | |
| 6 | "Main Kya Karun Hai Kya Karun" | |
| 7 | "Mann Mein Basakar Nainon Se" | |
| 8 | "Ram Shri Ram Raja Ram" | Mohammed Rafi |

== Remakes ==
Chandrasena
- Directed by: Babubhai Mistri
- Release date: 1959
- Country: India
- Language: Hindi

Hanuman Vijay
- Directed by: Babubhai Mistri
- Release date: 1974
- Country: India
- Language: Hindi

It was remade in 1959 as Chandrasena, with Mahipal reprising his role as Lord Rama and in 1974 as Hanuman Vijay with completely different cast, both being directed by Babubhai Mistri.
