= Saat Sawal =

1971 Indian film by Babubhai Mistry

- Directed by: Babubhai Mistry
- Starring: Neville Symons; Heena Kumari
- Music by: Lala Sattar
- Release date: 1971
- Running time: 136 minutes
- Country: India
- Language: Hindi

Saat Sawal is a 1971 Bollywood adventure film directed by Babubhai Mistry. The film stars Neville Symons and Heena Kumari.

== Cast ==
- Naval symons as Hatim-Al-Tai
- Heena Kumari as Gulnar Pari / Husna Pari
- Shyam Kumar as kamlaq
- Yusuf Khan as Munir Shah
- Johnny Whisky as Ghumroo Aiyar
- Sujata as Sabeena
- Jayshree T. as Shahezadi Shalomi
- Rajnibala as Dancer / Singer
- Manher Desai as
- Master Chintu as Gulnar Pari's brother

== Music ==
Song	Singer
"O Mere Khuda"	Mohammed Rafi
"Jaan-E-Mohabbat, Jaan-E-Tamanna, Mujhko Tumse"	Mohammed Rafi, Asha Bhosle
"Aadab Arz Hai"	Asha Bhosle
"Pyar Leke Aaya Hai"	Asha Bhosle
"Zindagi Mili Zindagi"	Asha Bhosle
"Aaj Kuch Honewala Hai"	Asha Bhosle
