= Nanabhai Bhatt =

Indian director and producer

- Born: 12 June 1915; Porbandar, Porbandar State, Kathiawar Agency, British India (present-day Gujarat, India)
- Died: 24 April 1999 (aged 83); Mumbai, Maharashtra
- Other names: Yeshwant Bhatt; Batuk Bhatt
- Occupations: Film director; Film producer
- Years active: 1942–1988
- Spouse(s): Hemlata Bhatt; Shirin Mohammad Ali
- Children: 9 (including Mahesh Bhatt, Mukesh Bhatt & Robin Bhatt)
- Relatives: See Bhatt family

Nanabhai Bhatt (12 June 1915 – 24 April 1999) was an Indian film director and producer who worked in Hindi and Gujarati cinema. He is known for making over a hundred fantasy and mythological films, including Mr. X (1957), Zimbo Comes to Town (1960), Lal Qila (1960) and Kangan (1959) starring Nirupa Roy and Ashok Kumar. His first film, Muqabala (1942), was the first to feature the double-role or "twins" phenomenon in Indian cinema, wherein lead actress Fearless Nadia alternated between the good sister and the gangster's moll. The formula was subsequently emulated in numerous Hindi films.

== Early life ==
Bhatt, called Yeshwant Bhatt, was born in a Nagar Brahmin family on 12 June 1915 in Porbandar, British India. He started his early career in films as a sound recordist with Prakash Pictures, working under his brother Balwant Bhatt, and then by writing "scripts and stories" using the name Batuk Bhatt.

== Career ==
He began his directorial venture when he joined Homi Wadia's team at Basant Pictures by co-directing two films with Babubhai Mistri, Muqabala (1942) and Mauj (1943), under the same name. He directed two more films as Batuk Bhatt, Homi Wadia's Hunterwali Ki Beti (1943) and Liberty Pictures Sudhar (1949). Bhatt left Basant Pictures and started his own production company "Deepak Pictures" in 1946.

Over the next few decades, Bhatt became a prolific filmmaker, particularly known for his work in the mythological and fantasy genres. He directed over 70 Hindi and Gujarati films, many of which featured religious and heroic themes. Some of his most notable films include Alibaba Aur Chalis Chor (1954), Zimbo (1958), and Lal Qila (1960).

Bhatt was instrumental in shaping the mythological cinema of the 1950s and 1960s, popularizing stories from Indian epics like the Ramayana and Mahabharata through low-budget yet widely successful films.

He was also a key figure in the Gujarati film industry, directing several Gujarati-language films such as Gajara Maru (1981) and Jaya Parvati Vrat (1982), which found success among regional audiences.

== Personal life ==
Bhatt was the patriarch of the Bhatt family. He was married to Shia Muslim actress, Shirin Mohammad Ali since 1939. The couple had six children – Sheila Bhatt, Purnima Bhasin, Kumkum Saigal, Mahesh Bhatt, Heena Suri and Mukesh Bhatt. Later, Nanabhai married Hemlata Bhatt, with whom he had three children – Robin Bhatt, Parmesh Bhatt, and Mamta Bhatt. Between both of his partners, he had five daughters and four sons. Through his relationship with Shirin, he was the brother-in-law of actress Purnima.

Bhatt died at Nanavati hospital in Mumbai from heart failure on 24 April 1999.

== Influence and recognition ==
- Honored by several Gujarati cultural organizations for his work in Gujarati devotional cinema during the early 1980s.
- Posthumously recognized in retrospectives on early Indian cinema as a pioneer of low-budget mythological and fantasy filmmaking.
- Commemorated by film historians and critics for his influence on the genre and as the patriarch of a family of filmmakers, including Mahesh Bhatt and Alia Bhatt.

== Filmography ==
=== As Producer ===
Year	Title	Notes
1988	Kabzaa	—

=== As Director ===
Year	Title	Notes
1982	Jaya Parvati Vrat	Gujarati film
1981	Gajara Maru	Gujarati film
1976	Dharti Mata	
1975	Balak Aur Janwar	
1974	Jeevan Rekha	
1968	Jung Aur Aman	
1967	Baghdad Ki Raatein	
1966	Shankar Khan	
1965	Bekhabar	
1965	Aadhi Raat Ke Baad	
1964	Samson	
1963	Alapiranthavan	Tamil film
1963	Bhootnath	
1963	Naag Rani	
1962	Rocket Girl	
1962	Baghdad Ki Raaten	
1961	Teen Ustad	
1960	Police Detective	
1960	Lal Quila	
1960	Zimbo Shaher Mein	
1959	Daaka	
1959	Baazigar	
1959	Kangan	
1959	Naya Sansar	
1959	Madam XYZ	
1958	Son of Sinbad	
1958	Chaalbaaz	
1957	Mr. X	
1957	Ustad	
1956	Kismet	
1954	Watan	
1954	Toote Khilone	
1952	Sinbad Jahazi	
1952	Apni Izzat	
1952	Baghdad	
1951	Lakshmi Narayan	
1951	Ram Janma	
1951	Daman	
1951	Lav Kush	
1950	Janmashtami	
1950	Veer Babruwahan	
1950	Hamara Ghar	
1949	Veer Ghatotkach	
1949	Shaukeen	
1946	Maa Baap Ki Laaj	
1946	Chalis Karod	
1943	Mauj	
1942	Muqabala	It was the first to feature the double-role phenomenon in Indian cinema
