= Zabak =

1961 film

- Directed by: Homi Wadia
- Written by: Cavish
- Screenplay by: JBH Wadia
- Story by: C. L. Cavish
- Produced by: Wadia Brothers Production
- Starring: Mahipal; Shyama; Achala Sachdev; Manhar Desai
- Cinematography: Anant Wadadeker
- Edited by: Kamlakar
- Music by: Chitragupta
- Production company: Basant Studios
- Release date: 13 January 1961
- Running time: 156 min
- Country: India
- Language: Hindustani

Zabak is a 1961 Hindi/Urdu action costume drama film produced and directed by Homi Wadia for his Basant Pictures under the Wadia Productions banner.

The story and dialogue were by C. L. Cavish, with screenplay by JBH Wadia. The music composer was Chitragupta, with lyrics by Prem Dhawan. The cast of the film included Shyama, Mahipal, Sahira, Achala Sachdev, Manhar Desai, Muzaffar Adeeb and Krishna Kumari.

The film was a costume drama about a middle-class man in love with a princess. He joins the dacoits to avenge his father's death.

This film was remade in Tamil with the title Arabu Naattu Azhagi. Tamil version movie's music was composed by Vijayabaskar.

== Plot ==
Hajji (Mahipal) is a carefree young man in love with the princess Zainab (Shyama). His father is a middle-class man who runs a Hamam (Bath house). He is not happy with his son's relationship with the princess because of their social inequality. The minister Qasim Beg has Hajji and his father arrested. The father's hair is shaven off as punishment while Zabak is whipped. The father, out of shame for his situation, commits suicide. Zabak is thrown out of the city gates, where he saves Saudagar (merchant) Usman Shah's daughter from being kidnapped. Usman Shah (B. M. Vyas), though posing as a merchant, turns out to be a dacoit. Hajji, now Zabak, joins the dacoits, albeit unwillingly. When Usman plans to attack and loot Zabak's home town Isbahan, he goes along as he finds out that Qasim Beg will marry Zainab. During the dacoity, Zainab is abducted by one of Usman's men. Qasim, who was in a fight with Zabak and left for dead, kills the Sultan and takes his place. Zabak goes through being misunderstood by his beloved and his mother, but with help from his friends, he succeeds in righting all the wrongs committed by Qasim and marries the princess.

== Cast ==
- Shyama as Zainab
- Mahipal as Zabak/Hajji
- Sahira as Samina
- Krishna Kumari as Salma
- Achala Sachdev as Zabak's mother
- Manhar Desai
- Adeeb
- W. M. Khan
- B. M. Vyas as Usman Shah/dacoit
- Babu Raje
- Uma Dutt
- Sardar Mansoor
- Mithoo Miyan

== Music ==
Prem Dhawan wrote all the songs and Chitragupt composed them. "Teri Duniya Se Door" became a successful song for Mohammed Rafi and Lata Mangeshkar. The singers included Geeta Dutt, Lata Mangeshkar, Mahendra Kapoor, Mohammed Rafi, Mukesh and Balbir.

=== Songlist ===
#	Title	Singer
1	"Tujhko Main Jaan Gai, Maan Ya Na Maan, Wai Wai"	Lata Mangeshkar, Mohammed Rafi
2	"Teri Duniya Se Door Chale Hoke Majboor, Hamein Yaad Rakhna"	Mohammed Rafi, Lata Mangeshkar
3	"Shama Jale Armaanon Ki"	Lata Mangeshkar
4	"Mujhe Mubarak Purani Yaadein" (same as "Mehlon Ne Chheen Liya")	Mukesh, Lata Mangeshkar
5	"Teri Taqdeer Ka Sitara"	Geeta Dutt, Mohammed Rafi, Balbir
6	"Mehlon Ne Chheen Liya Bachpan Ka Pyar Mera"	Mukesh, Lata Mangeshkar
7	"Himmat Kare Insan"	Mahendra Kapoor
8	"Humko Be De De Sahara"	Mohammed Rafi
9	"Jaane Kaisa Chhane Laga Nasha Yeh Pyar Ka"	Lata Mangeshkar
