= Muqabala =

1942 Indian film by Nanabhai Bhatt, Babubhai Mistry

- Directed by: Nanabhai Bhatt; Babubhai Mistri
- Produced by: JBH Wadia
- Starring: Fearless Nadia; Yakub; Agha
- Music by: Khan Mastana
- Production company: Wadia Movietone
- Release date: 1942
- Running time: 132 min
- Country: India
- Language: Hindustani

Muqabala is a 1942 Indian action drama film directed by Batuk Bhatt and Babubhai Mistri, and starring Fearless Nadia, Yakub, Agha, Dalpat, Srinivas and Rajni. Batuk Bhatt started his career as a director by co-directing this film and Mauj (1943) and was a name used by Nanabhai Bhatt. The dog Gunboat was also billed in the credit roll of the film and on the posters. The music of the film was composed by Khan Mastana with lyrics by A. Karim. The story revolves around Nadia who plays a double-role of twin sisters separated at birth, one growing up surrounded by luxury and the other brought up by a gangster as a dancer. The romantic interest was provided by Yakub. It is also the first film in India to use the double role format.

== Plot ==
Madhuri and Rani are twin sisters whose parents, Seth Dinanath and Radha, are shot in front of them by their mother's rejected suitor Shivnath. The mother dies and the father is kept prisoner by Shivnath who also kidnaps Rani. Madhuri is found wandering by a rich man Rai Bahadur, who takes her home and adopts her. Several years pass and Madhuri is enjoying her life in luxury. She has a dog called Gunboat who accompanies her everywhere. She finds out about her parents and sees Rani dance at a nightclub. She vows vengeance and soon the sisters along with two friends fight their way to the gangster and free their father.

== Cast ==
- Fearless Nadia as Madhuri/Rani
- Yakoob as Niranjan
- Shreenivas as Ramesh
- Rajni as Bina
- Dalpat as Shivnath
- Agha as Ramu
- Nazira as Bijli
- Baby Madhuri as Young Madhuri/Rani
- M. K. Hasan as Raibahadur Biharilal
- Jal Khambata as Dinanath
- Khan Mastana as Singer at Club
- A. Rehman as Bhado
- Kunzru
- Azim as Savan
- Habib as Bijli's Brother
- Gunboat as Dog

== Soundtrack ==
Khan Mastana, also known as Hafeez Khan Mastana, acted in the film and composed the music, with lyrics written by A. Karim. The songs were sung by Yakub, Srinivas, Rajni, Nazira, Khan Mastana and Agha.

=== Song list ===
#	Title	Singer(s)
1	"Main Kho Jaaoon"	Srinivas, Rajni
2	"Mohe Makhmal Ki Choli Bana De Balma"	Nazira
3	"Mori Jholi Bhar De"	Khan Mastana
4	"Mujrim Hoon Mohabbat Ka"	Yakub
5	"Piya Nainon Mein Aan Samaye"	Rajni
6	"Uth Jaa Bijli Pyari"	Khan Mastana
7	"Aao Sajan Aao"	Srinivas, Rajni
8	"Hum Apne Dard Ka Kissa"	Khan Mastana
9	"Chalo Chalen Us Des Sajni"	Agha
