= Rameshwar Singh Kashyap =

Bhojpuri playwright and professor (1927–1992)

- Born: 16 August 1927; Sasaram, Bihar and Orissa Province, British India
- Died: 20 October 1992 (aged 65)
- Occupations: Professor (Patna University); Author
- Writing career
- Notable work: Loha Singh

Rameshwar Singh Kashyap (16 August 1927 – 20 October 1992) was a Bhojpuri playwright, screenwriter and professor of Hindi at Patna University. He is best known for his Bhojpuri play Loha Singh which was gained immense popularity on Radio in 1970s. He was awarded the Padma Shri in 1991.

== Life ==
=== Early life and education ===
Kashyap was born in 1927 in Semra, a village in Sasaram of Bihar. His father, Rai Bahadur Janaki, was a DSP in the British Government and his mother's name was Ramasakhi Devi. He started in early education in Navgachia in Munger district of Bihar and also completed his Matriculation from Munger Town school. He completed his Bachelor of Arts in 1948 and Master of Arts in 1950 from Patna University and later became the professor of Hindi at B.N. College in Patna University, later he became professor of a college in Arrah and also retired from there.

=== Career ===
His career as a writer started in 1942, his first Hindi composition was published in monthly journal Kishor in Patna. Later he got popularity for his writing like Bhojpuri play Loha Singh. In 1960s his Bhojpuri short story Machhri was published in the April edition of weekly journal Anjor. In 1991 he was honoured with Padma Shree award.

=== Death ===
He died in 1992 due to diabetes.

== Filmography ==
- He starred as Loha Singh in the movie Loha Singh based on his play.

== Works ==
- Loha Singh
- Tasalwā Tor ki Mor
- Nilkantha Nirala
- Prabhat Varnan (Poem)
- Machhari (Short Story)
- Bhauji Se Bhent (Play)

== Awards ==
- Padma Shri, in 1991 in the field of literature.
