= Mahabharat (1965 film) =

- Directed by: Babubhai Mistri
- Written by: Veda Vyasa; Pandit Madhur; C.K. Mast; Vishwanath Pande
- Produced by: A. A. Nadiadwala
- Starring: Pradeep Kumar; Padmini; Dara Singh
- Cinematography: Narendra Mistry; Peter Parreira
- Edited by: Kamlakar Karkhanis
- Music by: Chitragupta
- Release date: 1965
- Running time: 163 minutes
- Country: India
- Language: Hindi

Mahabharat is a 1965 Hindi adventure fantasy film based on the Indian epic Mahabharata, starring Pradeep Kumar, Padmini, Dara Singh, Abhi Bhattacharya, Manhar Desai, Tiwari, and directed by Babubhai Mistri. The score was composed by Chitragupta and the title song was sung by Mohammed Rafi.

The film was dubbed into Tamil with the title Panchali Sabatham and was released in 1966. K. Devanarayanan wrote the dialogues. Kannadasan and Panchu Arunachalam penned the lyrics. Music to the Tamil version was composed by D. Srinivas. The Tamil-language film was produced by N. M. Ramachandran.

== Plot ==
The film starts with Kunti disposing her son Karna in Ganga river which is then taken by Adiratha and Radha. Pandu and Dhirtrashtra are two brothers who rule Hastinapur. Pandu marries Kunti, who conceives five sons and names them Yudhister, Bhimsen, Arjun, Nakul and Sahdev, while Dhirtrashtra, who is blind, marries Gandhari, and gives birth to a 100 sons, including Duryodhan and Dushasan. Gandhari's brother, Shakuni, also resides with them. Karna is now grown up but is rejected to by Drona and then learns by Parshurama. After Pandu passes away, Dhirtrashtra decides to bequeath the empire to Yudhister much to the chagrin of Duryodhan, who plots with Shakuni to kill them in a palace made of wax, but the brothers and Kunti manage to escape and live incognito in a forest where Bhimsem meets with, Hidimba, slays her demon brother, Hidimb, marries her and sires a son, an illusionist, Ghatotkach. The brothers do reveal their identity when Arjun wins a competition at Panchal to wed Draupadi defeating Duryodhan, Dushashan, Jarasandh and others. Kunti unwittingly asks the brothers to share Draupadi, as she had in a previous birth as Devi Maa Parvati, prayed to Lord Shiva five times for a husband. Dhirtrashtra acknowledges the enmity between the cousins and asks five brothers to re-locate to Khandavprasth, which is subsequently transformed by Devraj Indra's aide, Vishwakarma, and renamed Indraprasht. Duryodhan is then humiliated by Draupadi, who mocks him and tells him that sons of a blind man are also blind, when he stumbles in the Maya Mahal, and he takes a vow to humiliate her. Shakuni then invites the five brothers to gamble at Hastinapur where Yudhister ends up losing Indraprasht, his brothers, his wealth as well as Draupadi herself. Lord Krishna comes to her aid when Dushashan publicly disrobes her as no one comes to her defense. The Pandavas are then sentenced to 13 years in exile, which will be extended by 12 years more if they are discovered during the 13th year. When the Pandavas return to claim Indraprastha, the Kauravas oppose and challenge them to a war in the Kurkshetra. Duryodhan chooses Lord Krishna's armies, while Arjun chooses Krishna himself, who decides to only be the charioteer for Arjun. And it is here that Lord Krishna who shows his true self to Arjun when he hesitates to kill his relatives, cousins, and gurus. It is here that Gandhari will bless Duryodhan with a body of steel,

Kunti will go to plead with Karan to show mercy to her five sons, and Pawanputra Hanuman, the elder brother of Bhima, decides to make an incognito appearance, in this epic battle between Good and Evil.

== Cast ==
- Pradeep Kumar as Arjuna
- Padmini as Draupadi
- Dara Singh as Bhima
- Abhi Bhattacharya as Krishna
- Tiwari as Duryodhana
- Manher Desai as Karna
- Arvind Pandya
- Raj Prakash
- Raj Kumar
- Jeevan as Shakuni
- Maruti
- Achala Sachdev as Kunti
- Mumtaz Begum as Gandhari
- Tiger Joginder as Hidimb
- Ambika Sukumaran as Hidimbi
- Madhumati
- Jeevan Kala
- Sujata
- Mridula
- Sobhana
- Salim
- Kanak
- Paul Sharma
- Shekhar Purohit
- P. Kailash
- Champak Lala
- Aruna
- Vishwas Kunte
- Pt. Badri Prasad
- Johny Whisky
- Ajit Sony

== Soundtrack ==
1. "Bahut Din Beete Puraani Baat Hai" - Mohammed Rafi
2. "Chakravyuh Ka Chakra Gira Hai" - Mohammed Rafi
3. "Champakali Chhup Chhup Jaaye Re" - Asha Bhosle
4. "Hari Hari Dharti Hai" - Lata Mangeshkar
5. "He Rakhi Bandhnewale Kahan Chhupe Ho" - Mohammed Rafi
6. "Meri Chhun Chhun Chhun PaayalSun Tujhko Pukaare" - Kamal Barot & Suman Kalyanpur
7. "O Chanda Aaj Ki Raat Na Dhalana" - Lata Mangeshkar & Mahendra Kapoor
8. "Sakhi Ri Baaje Man Ki Baansuriya" - Lata Mangeshkar
9. "Sukh Jaata Hai Dukh Aata Hai" - Mohammed Rafi
10. "Tan N Dir Dir Dim Dimat Dere Na" - Usha Mangeshkar
