= Mr. X (1957 film) =

- Directed by: Nanabhai Bhatt
- Based on: The Invisible Man (1897) by H. G. Wells
- Produced by: G. Sippy
- Starring: Ashok Kumar; Nalini Jaywant; Pran
- Music by: N. Dutta
- Release date: 1957
- Country: India
- Language: Hindi

Mr. X is a 1957 Indian Hindi-language science fiction film directed by Nanabhai Bhatt and produced by G. Sippy. It is based on H. G. Wells's novel The Invisible Man (1897). The film stars Ashok Kumar in the titular role, along with Nalini Jaywant and Pran.

Mr. X premiered at Royal Opera House, Bombay, on 12 April 1957. A reviewer for The Times of India commented on its "moronic mass appeal". The film was reportedly a commercial success.

== Cast ==
- Ashok Kumar
- Nalini Jaywant
- Pran
- Johnny Walker
- Mehmood
- Nishi
- Leela Mishra
- Sheela Vaz
- Helen

== Music ==
The film features a soundtrack composed by N. Dutta, with lyrics penned by Hasrat Jaipuri, Tanvir Naqvi, Bharat Vyas, and Majrooh Sultanpuri.

== Production ==
Ashok Kumar completed his scenes for Mr. X in five days, which biographer Kishore Valicha described as "perhaps his shortest shooting schedule".
