= Loha Singh (play) =

Bhojpuri Play by Rameshwar Singh Kashyap

- Written by: Rameshwar Singh Kashyap
- Original language: Bhojpuri
- Subject: Social Issues
- Genre: Theatre

Premiere
- Date premiered: 1954 (All India Radio, Patna)

Loha Singh (Bhojpuri: 𑂪𑂷𑂯𑂰 𑂮𑂱𑂁𑂯) is a Bhojpuri play by playwright Rameshwar Singh Kashyap. This play revolves around a retired British Army veteran named Loha Singh. This play was a regular weekly feature of All India Radio Patna.

== Characters ==
- Loha Singh, A retired army veteran
- Khaderan Ka Mother, Wife of Loha Singh

== Story ==
The play revolves around Loha Singh, who fought the First World War in Afghanistan. Its episodes used to be based on the recent incidents happening in the country.

== Popularity ==
This play gained immense popularity in 1950s among people by its weekly broadcast on All India Radio, Patna. Due to its popularity Kashyap also wrote the second part of the play with the name Loha Singh: Murabbe aur anya kartuten.

== Legacy ==
- In 1966, the play was filmed and released a Bhojpuri feature film Loha Singh.
- This play played an important role in Indian politics when Lalu Prasad used the style of Loha singh to Influence people.
