= Aladdin Aur Jadui Chirag =

1952 film

Aladdin And The Wonderful Lamp
- Poster
- Directed by: Homi Wadia
- Written by: J. B. H. Wadia; Tejnath Zar
- Screenplay by: J. B. H. Wadia
- Story by: J. B. H. Wadia
- Based on: Arabian Nights
- Produced by: Homi Wadia
- Starring: Mahipal; Meena Kumari
- Cinematography: Anant Wadadeker
- Edited by: Kamlaker
- Music by: S. N. Tripathi; Chitragupta
- Production company: Basant Studios
- Release date: 1952
- Running time: 140 min
- Country: India
- Language: Hindi

Aladdin and the Wonderful Lamp (Hindi: अलादीन और जादु चिराग, romanized: Aladdin Aur Jadui Chirag) is a 1952 Indian fantasy film produced and directed by Homi Wadia.

Made under the Basant Pictures banner, it had story, scenario and additional dialogue by JBH Wadia. The dialogues were written by Tejnath Zar. The music of the film was composed by S. N. Tripathi and Chitragupta. It stars Mahipal, Meena Kumari in the lead roles, with S. N. Tripathi, B. M. Vyas, Pandit Amarnath and Raja Sandow.

This fantasy film from the Arabian Nights follows the adventures of Aladdin and his finding of the magic lamp in the cave, and his love for the princess Badar.

== Synopsis ==
The film starts in a magician's den in a cave where the magician, Hikmat (S. N. Tripathi), tells a genie-like figure that he wants to rule the world. He is asked to get the magic lamp from a cave, where he will need to send someone who is honest and has twenty-one moles in the shape of a lamp on his hand. The magician finds Aladdin (Mahipal) who is in love with Princess Badar (Meena Kumari). Badar's father has been imprisoned and a look-alike substituted in his place by the evil minister Masood Beg. Masood Beg's son, Nazim, has Aladdin whipped for a minor fracas and the magician tends to him. He takes Aladdin to the cave and sends him down to get the lamp. When Aladdin refuses to hand over the lamp before coming out, Hikmat slams the entrance shut leaving Aladdin trapped. Aladdin manages to rub the lamp and a genie appears. The genie helps Aladdin get out of the cave, marry the princess, free Badar's father, have him reinstated as the Sultan and build a palace for him. The story follows the magician getting hold of the lamp and Aladdin's adventures from then on, till he gets the lamp back and manages to vanquish evil.

== Cast ==
- Mahipal as Aladdin
- Meena Kumari as Princess Badar
- S. N. Tripathi as Jadugar Hikmat
- B. M. Vyas as Ikam
- Jillo Bai as Chachi
- Vasantrao Pahelwan as Jinn (Genie)

== Production ==
The special effects and art direction for the film were by Babubhai Mistry. He became associated with the spectacular effects in mythologies and fantasy genres. Homi Wadia had left Wadia Movietone to start Basant Pictures in 1942 and concentrated on making mythologies. However, his adventure and fantasy films also became box office successes. Though by name, Basant Pictures was Homi Wadia's company, JBH Wadia continued as a collaborator giving inputs in story, screenplay and dialogue sections.

== Music ==
The music directors were S. N. Tripathi and Chitragupta. The lyricists were Pandit Chand, Shyam Hindi, Ramesh Chandra Pandey and Anjum Jaipuri. The playback singing was by Mohammed Rafi, Lata Mangeshkar, Shamshad Begum, Asha Bhosle and Chitragupta.

=== Songlist ===
Song	Singer
"Jurm Duniya Ke Sahe"	Lata Mangeshkar
"Hey Taadir Hoon Irani, Hai Naam Mera Ramzani"	Chitragupta, Shamshad Begum
"Yun Hi Ulfat Ke Maron Par Yeh Duniya Zulm Karti Hai"	Mohammed Rafi, Shamshad Begum
"Ho Sake To Dil Ke Badle Dil Inayat Kijiye, Keh Rahi Hai Har Nazar Humse Mohabbat Kijiye"	Asha Bhosle, Shamshad Begum, Mohammed Rafi, Chitragupta
"Sharmake Zara Ae Mast Ada Itna To Bata"	Asha Bhosle, Shamshad Begum
"Insaaf Kar O Aasman"	Shamshad Begum
"Aankhon Mein Jadu"	Shamshad Begum
