= Loha Singh =

- Directed by: Kundan Kumar
- Written by: Rameshwar Singh Kashyap
- Screenplay by: Kundan Kumar
- Based on: Loha Singh by Rameshwar Singh Kashyap
- Produced by: Mohan Rai Khaitan
- Starring: Sujit Kumar; Vijaya Chowdhury; Rameshwar Singh Kashyap
- Music by: S. N. Tripathi
- Production company: Vikramsheel Arts
- Release date: 1966
- Country: India
- Language: Bhojpuri

Loha Singh is Bhojpuri film released in 1966 produced by Mohan Rai Khaitan and directed by Kundan Kumar under the banner of Vikramsheel Arts. The film stars Sujit Kumar in the title role, alongside Vijaya Chowdhury, Rameshwar Singh Kashyap, Tiwary, Sheel Kumar, and Helen. Based on a play named Loha Singh written by Rameshwar Singh Kashyap, the film centered on character of Loha Singh, a retired British Army veteran who fought in the First World War in Afghanistan. The move to a film format enabled the story to be presented visually rather than through radio; yet its circulation stayed mostly limited to Bhojpuri-speaking audiences in Bihar and eastern Uttar Pradesh.

Loha Singh was produced immediately after the commercial success of three Bhojpuri films—Ganga Maiyya Tohe Piyari Chadhaibo, Laagi Nahi Chhute Ram, and Bidesiya—all released during the initial years (1962–63) of the “first phase of the Bhojpuri cinema”, which extended from 1962 to 1968. Ganga Maiyya Tohe Piyari Chadhaibo, made on a budget of ₹5 lakhs, earned approximately ₹75 lakhs, yielding a fifteen fold return. Laagi Nahi Chhute Ram was described as a “massive hit”, while Bidesiya was regarded as a “major hit. The combined success of these three films attracted considerable interest from both Bhojpuri-speaking and non Bhojpuri producers and financiers hoping to make a return of—if not fifteen times—at least three to four times their investment. Among those who jumped into the fray was producer Mohan Rai Khaitan, who assembled a cast and crew intended to replicate the proven elements of earlier productions. As in Ganga Maiya Tohe Piyari Chadhaibo and Laagi Nahi Chhute Ram, Kundan Kumar was engaged to direct, while Sujit Kumar—who had led the star cast of Bidesiya—was cast as the main lead. S. N. Tripathi, the composer of Bidesiya, was similarly recruited to score Loha Singh. In this configuration, Loha Singh functioned as a deliberate extension of the practices that had come to define the early commercial architecture of Bhojpuri cinema.

== Plot ==
The film follows Loha Singh, a retired British Army veteran who served in Afghanistan during the First World War. It is adapted from Rameshwar Singh Kashyap’s acclaimed play of the same name. Told largely from Loha Singh’s perspective, the narrative intertwines his personal experiences with the broader social and historical conditions of the time. As he adjusts to life after military service, the story integrates parallel narrative strands that reflect contemporary social and political issues within the community. Through its depiction of Loha Singh’s perseverance and moral integrity, the film functions both as a character study and a subtle commentary on the social realities of its setting, drawing inspiration from real events and familiar local circumstances.

== Cast ==
- Sujit Kumar as Loha Singh
- Vijaya Chowdhury as Loha Singh's wife
- Rameshwar Singh Kashyap
- Tiwary
- Sheel Kumar
- Helen

== Soudtrack ==
The film’s songs were composed by S. N. Tripathi and the lyrics were written by Rameshwar Singh Kashyap.

Soundtrack
Song	Singers	Ref(s)
Ajab kail leela gajab kail maalik	Manna Dey, Mohammed Rafi	
Kaise laagee paar	Manna Dey	

== See also ==
- Bhojpuri cinema
- List of Bhojpuri films
