= Wishing Moon =

2004 novel by Michael O. Tunnell

- Author: Michael O. Tunnell
- Cover artist: Jo Tronc
- Language: English
- Genre: Fantasy novel
- Publisher: Dutton Children's Books
- Publication date: 3 June 2004
- Publication place: United States
- Media type: Print
- Pages: 266 pp
- ISBN: 0-525-47193-6

Wishing Moon by Michael O. Tunnell is a modern-style Arabian fantasy for children. It was published in New York in 2004 by Dutton Children's Books, and is followed by a sequel titled Moon Without Magic.

== Plot summary ==
Wishing Moon follows the tale of Aminah Barnes, a beggar orphan who is thrown Aladdin's magical lamp by an unwitting princess, Badr Al-Budur, after Aladdin has married her. As Aminah works out problems with the lamp and its demon, she eventually begins her own journey of emotions while trying to avoid the notice of the spoiled and ambitious princess who seeks to regain the lost lamp. After settling into a moderately prosperous life, Aminah decides to help other people in need, but selectively, only helping those who help others. Soon, however, her good deeds draw the unwanted eye of Badr Al-Budur.

== Characters ==
- Aminah Barnes: The main character and an orphaned beggar in the city Al-Kal'as, Aminah approaches the princess hoping for sympathy and gets knocked on the head with the jinni's lamp instead. Since she was raised in a comfortably middle-class family before being orphaned, she treats the jinni with politeness and sympathy, eventually earning his affection. With a moderately large sum of wealth, she purchases a house and takes in first Idris as a manservant and then Barra as cook. Aminah wishes for the ability to travel through time and space at will in order to fulfil a dream she shared with her father. Eager to help the poor but disenchanted with humanity's greed after practically starting a riot by giving too much to the beggars in the market, she adds to this ability an orb with which to seek out the best people to help in order to help others. Using these two abilities, she helps a tailor and foster-father of thirteen named Ahab and the selfless baker Hassan in their respective trades. Eventually, she is forced to rescue Hassan from Badr's dungeon and concoct a plan to escape Al-Kal'as. Over the course of the book, she also goes by the names Zubaydah and Zaynab, as well as impersonating an angel and is eventually revealed to be Cinderella's fairy godmother.
- Princess Badr Al-Budur: The spoiled and ambitious daughter of the Sultan, her name literally means 'full moon of full moons' because of her great beauty. She schemes with the captain of her guard, Saladin, to assassinate Aladdin and use the jinni to seize the throne, but has much difficulty locating Aminah because she underestimates the girl's wits by looking only for beggar girls, especially ones with too much money.
- Jinni: The jinni of Aladdin's bottle, he at first holds only contempt for Aminah and the human race as a whole, but begins to soften towards her as she does things no other master has, such as accepting the rules of wishing and offering him food. In order to be able to play chess against Aminah and spend more time out of the bottle, he takes on the form of the human he once was and the name Uncle Omar, after Aminah's father, who he looks much like. Over time, he does become something of a father figure and even threatens Hassan with all kinds of bodily harm, should Hassan ever take advantage of Aminah. At Aminah's urging and with her help, Jinni discovers he was once a ruthless landlord named Gindar who loved only his sister. When Aminah offers to go back in time and stop him from becoming a jinni, he declines, fearing both a relapse for those he has helped and causing a time paradox. Though very much a paternal figure for Aminah, he enjoys confusing her, primarily by making references to future things like pizza, Galileo, and New York City.
- Hassan: The handsome and orphaned son of a merchant, Hassan first meets Aminah outside the city while she is still dressed as a beggar and he is traveling with a caravan to pay off his father's debt to the Sultan. Aminah does not see him again until she uses her orb to search the city for a worthy soul and finds him in his bakery. In the interim, Hassan used what little money he has to set up a bakery, but rather than selling any bread, he gives all of it away to beggars and thus becomes impoverished. Aminah gives him, through wishes, several jars that will fill with any ingredient at his command, the ability to heat and cool ovens instantly, and baking knowledge that would not become common for several centuries (with this, he makes angel food cake and cream puffs). After the first meeting, Aminah never doubt's Hassan's loyalty or sincerity. As a result, Hassan and Aminah begin to develop a secret relationship by meeting after dark in the bakery, though everyone in Aminah's household soon discover it, one way or another. His earlier traveling companion, Rashid, reports his doings to the Princess and Hassan is captured and tortured, but gives up no information on Aminah. After being rescued with a wish, Jinni sends him ahead to Tyre inside his special pots.
- Idris: Aminah initially encounters Idris in a marketplace, where she uses him in a charade to divert the palace guards. Idris offers her his help, but she refuses until she meets him again in a horse market. Initially, she keeps him around in order to escape notice as an unescorted woman, but his eye for every marketable goods proves valuable. He develops feelings for Aminah, but is rebuffed and begins to keep his distance from the house, as well as staying behind when the rest move to Tyre. After they leave, he is implied to have become a traveling storyteller.
- Barra: Comes to the house to be Aminah's cook. Aminah never doubts her loyalty and Barra is only one of two characters in the book of whom this can be said. Barra eventually becomes a mother figure for Aminah and is attracted to Jinni, though she wants to have nothing to do with demons or magic. Aminah wishes for Barra to live long enough to see her great-grandchildren grow up and thus saves her life when a guard slits Barra's throat.
