= S. N. Tripathi =

Film music composer (1913-1988)

- Born: Shri Nath Tripathi; 14 March 1913; Benares, Benares State, British India
- Died: 28 March 1988 (aged 75); Bombay, Maharashtra, India
- Occupations: playback singer film music director film director
- Years active: 1936–1988

Shri Nath Tripathi (14 March 1913 – 28 March 1988) was an Indian composer, whose active years were from the 1930s to the 1980s.

Tripathi's multi-faceted work range included being a composer, writer, actor, and director of films. His debut film as an independent composer was Chandan (1942). He was the first composer to make use of the slogan "Jai Hind" (Victory to India) in a song in films, during the end of the British Raj. The song was "Jai Hind, Jai Hind, Jai Hind, Yeh Hind Ki Kahaniyan" from the film Mansarovar (1946). He gained popularity as an actor when he started playing the role of Hanuman in mythological and religious films like Homi Wadia's Shri Ram Bhakta Hanuman (1948) and Hanuman Pataal Vijay (1951).

Tripathi turned to direction in 1957 starting with Rani Roopmati. Two of his films with Nirupa Roy and Bharat Bhushan, Rani Roopmati (1957) and Kavi Kalidas (1959), are cited as having "cinematic merit" and "unforgettable music".

== Early life ==
S. N. Tripathi, was born in Varanasi, Uttar Pradesh. His father, Damodar Dutt Thakur, was a school principal. After obtaining his BSc from Allahabad, Tripathi got his training in classical music from Pandit V. N. Bhatkhande's Morris College of Music in Lucknow.

== Career ==
=== As composer ===
In 1935, Tripathi arrived in Bombay and found work as a violinist assisting music director Saraswati Devi at Bombay Talkies. His first film as a composer was Chandan (1942). He continued to compose for films like Janam Janam Ke Phere (1957), where the song "Zara Saamne Toh Aao Chhaliye" became the top Binaca Geetmala song. Trained as a classicist, the popularity of his songs from Rani Roopmati, Sangeet Samrat Tansen (1962) and other films has been attributed to Tripathi's mixing of Rajasthani folk with musical instruments like shehnai and mandolin, which never "offended sensibilities", yet had the "pulsating dance-like quality". His "experimental compositions" like "Na Kisi Ki Ankh Ka Noor Hoon" and "Lagta Nahin Hai Dil Mera" from the film Lal Qila (1960) remain popular.

According to Raju Bharatan, Ustad Amir Khan of film music composers, rated Naushad, S. N. Tripathi and Vasant Desai and to a lesser extent C. Ramchandra as notable composers. He gave music for several mythological and fantasy films and was "tagged as a mythological composer".

=== As actor ===
Interested in acting, Tripathi's first role was in the film Jeevan Naiya (1936). He acted in Uttara Abhimanyu (1946) and then played the role of Hanuman along with Trilok Kapoor who played Ram in the Homi Wadia directed superhit movie Ram Bhakt Hanuman (1948) where he also composed the music, his first prominent role as an actor. He was to continue playing the character of Hanuman in several films, including Homi Wadia's film, Hanuman Patal Vijay (1951).

=== As director ===
Besides acting and composing music, Tripathi began directing films in 1957. He first directorial venture was Rani Roopmati for which he also composed the music. In 1959, Tripathi directed Kavi Kalidas and Pakshiraj as well Ram Hanuman Yudh. In 1962, he directed Shiv Parvati starring Trilok Kapoor, Ragini and Jeevan. He ventured into directing Bhojpuri films like Bidesiya (1963), which became a success at the box-office. He continued to direct films till 1980 when he directed Jaagal Bhag Hamaar, his last film as a director.

== Death ==
Tripathi died on 28 March 1988 at the age of 75 years in Mumbai, Maharashtra.

== Filmography ==
=== As composer ===
- Chandan (1941)
- Sewa (1942)
- Duniya Tumhari Hai (1942)
- Chudiyan (1942)
- Panghat (1943)
- Shararat (1944)
- Bachpan (1945)
- Ramayani (1945)
- Ji Haan (1945)
- Adhar (1945)
- Uttara Abhimanyu (1946)
- Mansarovar (1946)
- Shri Ram Bhakta Hanuman (1948)
- Veer Ghatotkach (1949)
- Saudamini (1950)
- Shri Ganesh Mahima (1950)
- Laxmi Narayan (1951)
- Hanuman Patal Vijay (1951)
- Aladdin Aur Jadui Chirag (1952)
- Nav Durga (1953)
- Tilottama (1954)
- Durga Puja (1954)
- Alibaba and 40 Thieves (1954)
- Inaam (1955)
- Ratna Manjari (1955)
- Chirag-e-Cheen (1955)
- Roop Kumari (1956)
- Panna (1956)
- Sati Naag Kanya (1956)
- Raj Rani Meera (1956)
- Hatim Tai (1956)
- Delhi Durbar (1956)
- Bajrang Bali (1956)
- Rani Rupmati (1957)
- Ram Hanuman Yuddha (1957)
- Paristan (1957)
- Khuda Ka Banda (1957)
- Janam Janam Ke Phere (1957)
- Bhakt Pralhad (1959)
- Pakshiraj (1959)
- Kavi Kalidas (1959)
- Jagga Daku (1959)
- Sinhal Dweep Ki Sundari (1960)
- Lal Qila (1960)
- Chandramukhi (1960)
- Do Aadmi (1960)
- Piya Milan Ki Aas (1961)
- Ram Lila (1961)
- Jai Chitod (1961)
- Jadoo Nagri (1961)
- Amrit Manthan (1961)
- Shiv Parvati (1962)
- Sher Khan (1962)
- Sangeet Samrat Tansen (1962)
- Naag Devata (1962)
- Maya Jaal (1962)
- Bijli Chamke Jamna Paar (1962)
- Pareeksha (1963)
- Dev Kanya (1963)
- Zingaro (1963)
- Cobra Girl (1963)
- Bidesiya (1963)
- Mahasati Anusuya (1964)
- Shankar Khan (1966)
- Loha Singh (1966)
- Lav-Kush (1967)
- Nadir Shah (1968)
- Lahu Pukarega (1968)
- Har Har Gange (1968)
- Shri Krishna Leela (1971)
- Mahashivratri (1972)
- Baal Mahabharat (1973)
- Subhadra Haran (1974)
- Shri Ram Hanuman Yudha (1975)
- Naag Champa (1976)
- Jai Ambe Maa (1977)
- Jai Ganesh (1978)
- Jaagal Bhag Hamaar (1980)
- Sati Savitri (1981)
- Mahasati Tulsi (1985)
- 108 Teerthyatra (1987)

=== As actor ===
- Jeevan Naiya (1936)
- Uttara Abhimanyu (1946)
- Woh Zamana (1947)
- Ram Bhakta Hanuman (1948)
- Jai Hanuman (1948)
- Veer Ghatotkach (1949)
- Jai Mahakali (1951)
- Bhakta Puran (1952)
- Aladdin Aur Jadui Chirag (1952)
- Alibaba and 40 Thieves (1954)
- Bhagwat Mahima (1955)
- Delhi Durbar (1956)
- Janam Janam Ke Phere (1957)
- Kavi Kalidas (1959)
- Piya Milan Ki Aas (1961)
- Bidesiya (1963)
- Lav-Kush (1967)
- Deedar (1970)
- Mahashivratri (1972)
- Vishnu Puran (1973)
- Banarasi Babu (1973)
- Ponga Pandit (1975)
- Naag Champa (1976)
- Har Har Gange (1979)
- Mahabali Hanuman (1981)
- Paan Khaye Saiyan Hamaar (1984)
- 108 Teerthyatra (1987)

=== As director ===
- Rani Rupmati (1957)
- Ram Hanuman Yuddha (1957)
- Pakshiraj (1959)
- Kavi Kalidas (1959)
- Piya Milan Ki Aas (1961)
- Amrit Manthan (1961)
- Shiv Parvati (1962)
- Sangeet Samrat Tansen (1962)
- Dev Kanya (1963)
- Bidesiya (1963)
- Mahasati Anusuya (1964)
- Sita Maiyya (1964)
- Maharaja Vikram (1965)
- Kunwari (1966)
- Lav-Kush (1967)
- Nadir Shah (1968)
- Lahu Pukarega (1968)
- Sati Sulochana (1969)
- Vishnu Puran (1973)
- Maya Machchindra (1975)
- Naag Champa (1976)
- Jai Ganesh (1977)
- Jaagal Bhag Hamaar (1980)
- Sant Gyaneshwar (1981)
