= Shararat (1944 film) =

- Directed by: Kishore Sahu
- Produced by: Kishore Sahu
- Starring: Kishore Sahu; Protima Dasgupta; Maya Banerji; Sushil Sahu
- Music by: S. N. Tripathi; Khan Mastana
- Production company: Hindustan Chitra Productions
- Release date: 1944
- Country: India
- Language: Hindi

Shararat (Mischief) is a 1944 Hindi comedy film directed by Kishore Sahu. Produced by Hindustan Chitra Productions, it had music by S. N. Tripathi and Khan Mastana. Following the commercial success of his earlier comedy film Kunwara Baap (1942), Sahu made another comedy with Shararat, which he not only directed and wrote the story for, but also cast himself in the main role. The actors co-starring with him were Maya Banerji, Protima Dasgupta, Ramesh Gupta, Sushil Sahu and Moni Chatterjee.

The film was about a young woman pretending to be insane in order to avoid an arranged marriage.

== Plot ==
Raibahadur Hiralal Mathur is a wealthy man who lives with his wife and a stubborn, spoilt daughter Sudha. Her reckless driving of a new car nearly gets her into trouble when she bangs the car into Dr. Sharma. The Doctor suffers no serious injuries, instead he and Sudha fall in love. However, Sudha's mother has already arranged her marriage into a family of her interest. Sudha pretends to be insane, and the family call for the services of Dr. Sharma to help treat her.

== Cast ==
- Protima Dasgupta
- Kishore Sahu
- Maya Banerji
- Ramesh Gupta
- Sushil Sahu
- Gulab
- Moni Chatterji
- Ranibala

== Reception ==
Shararat was not as well received by the reviewers as Kunwara Baap (1942). Sahu, then thirty years old, was criticised for his looks, with Baburao Patel of Filmindia referring to him as a "tired and prematurely aged young man". Patel also commented on the "poor production" quality and called the film "a poor apology for a comedy".

== Soundtrack ==
The music directors were S. N. Tripathi and Khan Mastana. It had four lyricists, Girish, Ambikesh Kuntal, Rammurti Chaturvedi and A. Karim.

=== Song list ===
#	Title	Lyricist
1	"Aaj Saare Ghar Mein Dekho"	Ambikesh Kuntal
2	"Bedardi Chhedo Na Mohe"	Rammurti Chaturvedi
3	"Bhaiya Sambhal Ke Dena Vote"	Rammurti Chaturvedi
4	"Daya Tumhi Bhagwan Karo"	Ambikesh Kuntal
5	"Kuch Gun Gun Gaaye Jaa"	Rammurti Chaturvedi
6	"Kisne Lubhaya Mera Mann"	Girish
7	"Kaise Bhooli Raah Kisi Ki"	Rammurti Chaturvedi
8	"Tune Loot Liya Mohe Andheriya Mein"	A. Karim
9	"Un Bin Bhayin Bawri Ankhiyan"	Rammurti Chaturvedi
