= Nazrana (1942 film) =

- Directed by: G.P. Kapoor
- Written by: Dr.PrabhuNarayan
- Starring: Mahipal; Sunayana
- Release date: 1942
- Country: India
- Language: Rajasthani

Nazrana is the first Rajasthani film released in 1942.
