= Mauj =

1943 film by Nanabhai Bhatt, Babubhai Mistry

- Directed by: Nanabhai Bhatt; Babubhai Mistri
- Starring: Fearless Nadia
- Release date: 1942
- Country: India
- Language: Hindi

Mauj is a 1943 Bollywood film directed by Nanabhai Bhatt and Babubhai Mistri, starring Fearless Nadia as the lead.
