= Michael O. Tunnell =

American children's writer and educator (born 1950)

- Born: June 14, 1950 (age 76)
- Education: University of Utah; Utah State University; Brigham Young University
- Occupations: Writer; educator
- Parent(s): Billie Bob Tunnell; Mauzi Chupp
- Writing career
- Genre: Children's literature

Michael O. Tunnell (born June 14, 1950) is an American children's writer and educator. He was the department chair of children's literature at Brigham Young University (BYU), but recently retired. He has published several books on children's literature, especially on the work of Lloyd Alexander. Tunnell is a member of the Church of Jesus Christ of Latter-day Saints (LDS Church).

== Biography ==
Tunnell was born on June 14, 1950, to Billie Bob Tunnell and Mauzi Chupp. Although he was born in Nocona, Texas, he was raised in Red Deer, Alberta, Canada. When he was a teenager, his family moved back to the United States to Vernal, Utah. Beginning at a young age, he was an avid reader. He was raised by his grandparents, and his grandmother would read to him every day. He began studying law in college, until he visited an elementary school one day for his job at a car dealership. He realized that he wanted to pursue education instead.

Tunnell's education includes a bachelor's degree from the University of Utah in 1973, a master's degree from Utah State University in 1978, and a doctorate degree in education from Brigham Young University in 1986. He taught fifth and sixth grade in public schools for twelve years from 1973 to 1985. He also taught as a reading teacher and media specialist, before he decided to teach at the college level. Tunnell taught at Arkansas State University from 1985 to 1987, Northern Illinois University from 1987 to 1992, and currently teaches children's literature at BYU. As a professor he conducts research at BYU. Among his interests are children's literature and the effects it has on learning history.

Tunnell is the author of several books. He began writing during his teaching career. His first children's book was submitted over thirty times to different publishers and was never published. While working at Northern Illinois University, Tunnell's first picture book manuscript. Chinook, was published. He has had children's books published as well, and they include novels, picture books, and non-fiction books. Tunnell's first novel published was School Spirits, which drew from his childhood during the 1950s. He has been a speaker at educational conferences, and has published journal articles and other children's stories.

== Contributions and awards ==
Tunnell has served on the Newbery Award Committee in 1991 and 2009 as well as on the selection committee for the NCTE Award for Excellence in Poetry for Children. He was selected as the chair of the National Council of Teachers English Award for Excellence in Poetry for Children committee. Some of his publications have been nominated as "best books" by various institutions. He won the Literacy award in 1987 from the International Reading Association and the Northeast Arkansas Reading Council. He is an honorary member of the Golden Key National Honor Society, inducted in 1990. He has been nominated for Who's Who in the West on multiple occasions.

== Selected works ==
=== Articles ===
- "Profile: Eilonwy of the Red-gold Hair", Language Arts 66.5 (September 1989), pp. 558–
- "The Double-Edged Sword: Fantasy and Censorship", Language Arts 71.8 (1994), pp. 606–12
- "The Remarkable Journey of Lloyd Alexander", School Library Journal (2007), pp. 64–65
- "The Origins and History of American Children's Literature", The Reading Teacher 62.2 (2013), pp. 80–86

=== Books ===
- The Prydain Companion: A Reference Guide to Lloyd Alexander's Prydain Chronicles (1989)
- Lloyd Alexander: A Bio-bibliography (1991) (with James S. Jacobs)
- The Story of Ourselves: Teaching History Through Children's Literature (1992) (with Richard Ammon)
- The Joke's on George (1993)
- Chinook! (1993)
- Beauty and the Beastly Children (1993)
- Children's Literature, Briefly, 1st ed. with CD-ROM (1996), by James S. Jacobs and Tunnell OCLC 32271706
- Mailing May (1997)
- School Spirits (1997)
- Halloween Pie (1999)
- Brothers in Valor (2001)
- Children's Literature: Engaging Teachers and Children in Good Books, 1st ed. with CD-ROM (2002), by Daniel L. Darigan, Tunnell, and Jacobs, OCLC 1305298324
- Wishing Moon (2004)
- Moon Without Magic (2007)
- Children's Literature, Briefly, 4th ed. (2008), by Tunnell and Jacobs, ISBN 9780131734906
- Wishes on the Moon (2009)
- Candy Bomber (2010)
- Children's Literature, Briefly, 7th ed. (forthcoming August 2022), by Young, Bryan, Jacobs, and Tunnell, ISBN 978-0135185872
