= Uttara Abhimanyu =

- Release date: 1946
- Country: India
- Language: Hindi

Uttara Abhimanyu is an Indian Hindi-language film. It was released in 1946.
