= B. M. Vyas =

Indian actor (1920–2013)

B.M.Vyas
- बृज मोहन व्यास
- Born: Brij Mohan Vyas; 22 October 1920; Churu, Rajputana Agency, British India
- Died: 11 March 2013 (aged 92); Kalyan, Maharashtra, India
- Occupations: Actor, playback singer
- Years active: 1946–1995
- Spouse: Jamna
- Children: 7
- Relatives: Bharat Vyas (brother)

Brij Mohan Vyas (Hindi: बृज मोहन व्यास) (1920-2013) was an Indian actor of Bollywood who is best remembered for his role of Ravana in Babubhai Mistri's Sampoorna Ramayana (1961). He was the younger brother of lyricist Bharat Vyas.

== Early life ==
Vyas was born in the Churu district of Rajasthan on 22 October 1920 in pushkarna brahaman family. He remained in Rajasthan until he completed his graduation in Sanskrit, after which he moved to Mumbai, at the behest of his brother.

== Personal life ==
He was married at the age of 17 when his wife, Jamna was just 11. They had 71 years of marital lite before Jamna Vyas died in 2008. They had six daughters and a son. After acting in over 200 films in various languages, Vyas quit acting in the early 1990s.

=== Death ===
He died on 11 March 2013 at the age of 92.

== Filmography ==
This is selected list of films:-

Year	Film	Role
1946	Neecha Nagar	Balraj's brother
1949	Barsaat	
1951	Awaara	Dubey
1953	Patita	
1953	Baghi	
1954	Saltanat	Raj Guru
1954	Alibaba Aur 40 Chor	Abu Hasan
1956	Sheikh Chilli	Emir Abdullah
1956	Hatim Tai	Kamlakh
1957	Do Aankhen Barah Haath	Jalia Nai
1957	Tumsa Nahin Dekha	Gopal
1961	Sampoorna Ramayana	Ravana
1961	Saranga	Nagar Seth
1961	Zabak	Usman Shah
1962	Pardesi Dhola	Punjabi movie
1966	Yeh Raat Phir Na Aayegi	Sailor
1971	Ek Paheli	Kishen, Antique furniture Shop Owner
1975	Jai Santoshi Maa	Jeweller Businessman
1977	Shirdi Ke Sai Baba	Vaid
1991	Maa	Shaktimaan Baba Tantrik
1992	Daulat Ki Jung	Guruji of Tribal people
