= Mahipal =

Indian actor

- Born: 24 November 1919; Jodhpur, India
- Died: 15 May 2005 (aged 85); Mumbai, India
- Other name: Mahipal Chand Bhandari
- Occupation: Actor
- Spouse: Akkal Kunwar
- Children: Shushila Jain; Nirmala Oswal

Mahipal (1919 -2005) was an Indian actor who worked in bollywood mostly in stunt films like Parasmani, Zabak, Cobra Girl, Jantar Mantar, Arabian nights themed movies such as Alibaba and 40 Thieves, Aladdin Aur Jadui Chirag, Roop Lekha, Sunehari Nagin, Hindu mythological movies like Sampoorna Ramayan, Ganesh Mahima, Veer Bhimsen, Jai Santoshi Maa. He is known for playing the iconic role of Vishnu, and his two avatars, Rama and Krishna in lot of various puranic, Ramayana, Mahabharata, Bhagavata Purana based movies, besides playing Tulsidas and Abhimanyu, and is also best known as the lead in V. Shantaram's Navrang (1959), and the songs "Aadha Hai Chandrama Raat Aadhi", "Tu Chhupi Hai Kahan Me Tadapta Yahan" and "baazigar me tu jaadugar". He acted in several well-known films of the 1950s and 1960s including V. Shantaram's Navrang (1959) and Babubhai Mistry's Parasmani (1963).

== Biography ==
He was born in Jodhpur, Rajasthan, where after his schooling, he graduated in literature from Jaswant Government College Jodhpur. Thereafter, he worked in the theatre before migrating to Mumbai in the early 1940s.

He made his film debut in the 1942 film Nazrana. However, the film didn't work, thereafter he wrote lyrics for V. Shantaram for four films. He went on to work with directors such as Sohrab Modi and later with the Wadia Brothers, Homi Wadia and J. B. H. Wadia, however, it was his work with V. Shantaram that got him lasting acclaim. He worked in several mythological and historical films with actresses such as Nirupa Roy, Mala Sinha and even Meena Kumari. He also did a series of fantasy films based on Arabian Nights, including Alibaba and 40 Thieves (1954), Jennie (1953), Aladdin Aur Jadui Chirag (1952) and Alibaba ka Beta (1955), which gave him popularity even in the Gulf countries. Later in his career, he switched to character roles, and appeared in films such as Jai Santoshi Maa (1975), a 1970s hit. He died in Mumbai of cardiac arrest, at the age of 86. He was survived by his wife Akkal Kunwar and daughters Shushila Jain and Nirmala Oswal.

== Selected filmography ==
- Nazrana (1942)
- Shankar Parvati (1943)
- Mali (1944)
- Andhon Ki Duniya (1947) .... Kumar
- Banwasi (1948)
- Narasinha Avatar (1949) .... Narad
- Dawlat (1949) ....
- Shri Ganesh Mahima (1950) .... Krishna
- Nandkishore (1951)
- Lakshmi Narayan (1951)
- Jai Mahalaxmi (1951)
- Hanuman Patal Vijay (1951)
- Devyani (1952)
- Aladdin Aur Jadui Chirag (1952) .... Aladdin
- Dharma Pathni (1953) .... Manoharlal
- Khoj (1953)
- Husn Ka Chor (1953)
- Tulsidas (1954) .... Ram Bhola / Anami / Tulsidas
- Lal Pari (1954)
- Alibaba Aur 40 Chor (1954) .... Alibaba
- Teen Sardar (1955)
- Tatar Ka Chor (1955)
- Son of Ali Baba (1955) .... Akhtar
- Shah Behram (1955)
- Madhur Milan (1955)
- Jai Mahadev (1955)
- Hatimtai Ki Beti (1955) .... Salim
- Darbar (1955)
- Alladin Ka Beta (1955)
- Shree Krishna Bhakti (1955)
- Riyasat (1955)
- Ratna Manjari (1955)
- Mast Qalandar (1955)
- Mahasati Savitri (1955)
- Chirag-e-Cheen (1955)
- Sultan - E- Alam (1956)
- Sheikh Chilli (1956) .... Shehzada Nissar
- Makkhee Choos (1956) .... Narayan
- Lal E Yaman (1956)
- Khul Ja Sim Sim (1956)
- Husn Banu (1956)
- Sudarshan Chakra (1956)
- Sati Naag Kanya (1956)
- Roop Kumari (1956)
- Raj Rani Meera (1956)
- Lalkaar (1956)
- Caravan (1956)
- Bajrang Bali (1956)
- Aan Baan (1956)
- Sher-E-Baghdad (1957)
- Shahi Bazar (1957)
- Maya Nagri (1957)
- Chamak Chandni (1957)
- Pawan Putra Hanuman (1957)
- Naag Padmani (1957)
- Jannat (1957)
- Janam Janam Ke Phere: Alias Sati Anapurna (1957) .... Vishnu
- Alladdin Laila (1957)
- Teerth Yatra (1958)
- Sim Sim Marjeena (1958)
- Amar Pyar (1958)
- Taxi 555 (1958)
- Raj Sinhasan (1958)
- Maya Bazaar (1958) .... Bhagwan Shri Kishan
- Circus Sundari (1958)
- Al Hilal (1958)
- Akash Pari (1958)
- Tikadambaaz (1959)
- Navrang (1959) .... Divakar
- Dr. Z (1959)
- Chandrasena (1959)
- Rangeela Raja (1960)
- Abdulla (1960) .... Abdulla
- Sampoorna Ramayana (1961) .... Ram
- Zabak (1961) .... Zabak / Hajji
- Pyar Ki Jeet (1962) .... Pundarik
- Shree Ganesh (1962) .... Bhagwan Shri Krishan 'Gopala' 'Kanhaiya' / Bhagwan Shri Ram
- Rooplekha (1962)
- Naag Devata (1962)
- Baghdad Ki Raaten (1962)
- Naag Mohini (1963)
- Naag Jyoti (1963)
- Sunheri Nagin (1963) as Vijay
- Parasmani (1963) .... Paras
- Maya Mahal (1963)
- Kan Kan Men Bhagwan (1963) .... Jainath
- Dev Kanya (1963)
- Cobra Girl (1963) .... Sagar
- Been Ka Jadoo (1963)
- Baba Ramdev (1963)
- Veer Bhimsen (1964)
- Sati Savitri (1964)
- Roop Sundari (1964)
- Mahasati Behula (1964)
- Jantar Mantar (1964)
- Shahi Raqasa (1965)
- Chor Darwaza (1965)
- Shree Ram Bharat Milap (1965) .... Shree Ram, son of Dashrath
- Shankar Sita Ansuya (1965) .... Ram
- Maharaja Vikram (1965)
- Jahan Sati Wahan Bhagwan (1965) .... Rajkumar Abhikshit
- Naag Mandir (1966)
- Poonam Ka Chand (1967)
- Amar Jyoti (1967)
- Hanuman Chalisa (1969)
- Patthar Ke Khwab (1969)
- Veer Ghatotkach (1970) .... Bhagwan Shri Kishan / Kanhaiya
- Sampoorna Teerth Yatra (1970) .... Uttam
- Shree Krishna Arjun Yudh (1971) .... Bhagwan Krishan
- Brahma Vishnu Mahesh (1971) .... Vishnu
- Shri Krishna Arjun Yudh (1971) .... Shri Krishna
- Mahashivratri (1972)
- Vishnu Puran (1973) .... Bhagwan Sarvashri Vishnu / Ram / Kishan
- Balak Dhruv (1974)
- Mahapavan Teerth Yatra (1975)
- Jai Santoshi Maa (1975) .... Devrishi Narad
- Rani Aur Lalpari (1975)
- Jai Mahalaxmi Maa (1976) .... Vishnu
- Do Chehere (1977)
- Gopal Krishna (1979) .... Bhagwan Vishnu
- Navaratri (1983)
- Sant Ravidas Ki Amar Kahani (1983)
- Jai Baba Amarnath (1983)
- Amar Jyoti (1984) .... (final film role)
