= List of Hindi films of 1953 =

An overview of the films produced by the Bollywood film industry based in Mumbai in 1953.

Do Bigha Zameen directed and produced by Bengali director Bimal Roy and starring Balraj Sahni, Nirupa Roy, Ratan Kumar and Jagdeep won the Filmfare Best Movie Award. Bimal Roy also won the Filmfare Best Director Award and the film won the Certificate of Merit at National Film Award of India. Roy would win the Filmfare Best Director in 1955 also for the film Parineeta in which actress Meena Kumari scooped the Filmfare Best Actress Award for her performance.

== Highest-grossing films ==
The ten highest-grossing films at the Indian box office in 1953:

Rank	Title	Gross collection
1	Anarkali	₹2.35 crore
2	Ladki	₹1.50 crore
3	Do Bigha Zamin	₹1.30 crore
4	Parineeta	₹1.10 crore
5	Footpath	₹1 crore
6	Jhamela	₹95 lakh
7	Shikast	₹85 lakh
8	Humsafar	₹75 lakh
9	Aah	₹70 lakh
10	Rahi	₹65 lakh

== A–B ==
Title	Director	Cast	Genre	Music
Aabshar	Hasrat Luckhnavi	Nimmi, Kuldip Kaur, Raj Kumari, Lalita Pawar, Tiwari, Iftekhar	Social	Music: Ghulam Haider, Bhola Shreshtha Lyrics: Qateel Shifai, Sarshar Sailani, Waheed Qureshi
Aag Ka Dariya	Roop K. Shorey	Karan Dewan, Prithviraj Kapoor, Meena Shorey, Johnny Walker, Shammi, Uma Dutt, Manju, Cecil	Social	Music: Vinod Lyrics: Aziz Kashmiri, Hasrat Jaipuri
Aaghosh	R. D. Mathur	Nutan, Nasir Khan, Shakila, Iftekhar, Leela Mishra, Agha, S. Nazir	Social Drama	Music: Roshan Lyrics: Shailendra, Indeevar, Kaif Irfani, Uddhav Kumar
Aah	Raja Nawathe	Raj Kapoor, Nargis, Pran, Vijya Laxmi, Leela Mishra, Rashid Khan, Mukesh	Romantic Drama	Music: Shankar Jaikishan Lyrics: Shailendra, Hasrat Jaipuri
Aas	Devendra Goel	Kamini Kaushal, Shekhar, Om Prakash, Chanda Bai, Gulab, Master Ramesh, S K Prem	Family	Music: Shankar Jaikishan Lyrics: Shailendra, Hasrat Jaipuri
Akash	Manmohan Sabir	Balraj Sahni, Nadira, Agha, Manmohan Krishan, Badri Prasad, Shammi	Social Drama	Music: Anil Biswas Lyrics: Satyendra, Prem Dhawan, Majrooh Sultanpuri, Manmohan Sabir
Alif Laila	K. Amarnath	Nimmi, Vijay Kumar, Asha Mathur, Pran Tikku, Gope, Murad, Maya Devi	Fantasy Adventure	Music: Shyam Sunder Lyrics: Sahir Ludhianvi
Anand Bhawan	S. M. Yusuf	Manhar Desai, Nigar Sultana, Trilok Kapoor, Durga Khote, Tiwari	Family Drama	Music: Vasant Desai Lyrics: Noor Lakhnavi, Raja Mehdi Ali Khan
Anarkali	Nandlal Jaswantlal	Bina Rai, Pradeep Kumar, Kuldip Kaur, Mubarak, Manmohan Krishna, Ruby Myers	Historical Romantic Drama	Music: C. Ramchandra Lyrics: Rajendra Krishan, Shailendra
Ansoo	Shanti Kumar	Kamini Kaushal, Shekhar, Pran Kumkum, Amirbai Karnataki, Chaman Puri	Family Drama	Music: Husnlal Bhagatram Lyrics: Qamar Jalalabadi
Armaan	Fali Mistry	Dev Anand, Madhubala, Gajanan Jagirdar, Shakila, K. N. Singh, Murad, Gulab	Drama	Music: S. D. Burman Lyrics: Sahir Ludhianvi
Aurat	Bhagwan Das Varma	Premnath, Bina Rai, Purnima, Ulhas, Hiralal, Roopmala	Costume	Music: Shankar Jaikishan Lyrics: Shailendra, Hasrat Jaipuri
Baaz	Guru Dutt	Guru Dutt, Geeta Bali, Johnny Walker, K. N. Singh, Kuldip Kaur, Yashodra Katju, Jankidas, Ruby Myers, Moolchand	Costume Drama	Music: O. P. Nayyar Lyrics: Majrooh Sultanpuri
Babla	Agradoot	Pahari Sanyal, Molina, Manju Dey, Asit Baran, Hiralal	Social	Music: S. D. Burman Lyrics: Sahir Ludhianvi
Baghi	Anant Thakur	Naseem Banu, Ranjan, Pran, Shammi, Mukri, Anwar Hussain, B. M. Vyas	Costume	Music: Madan Mohan Lyrics: Majrooh Sultanpuri
Bahadur	Ratilal Punatar	Shyama, Suresh, Amarnath, Anwar Hussain, Roopmala, Shammi	Costume Drama	Music: S. Mohinder Lyrics: Surjit Sethi, Raja Mehdi Ali Khan, Rajendra Krishan, Sarshar Sailani, Kunwar Mahendra Singh Bedi,
Bahu Beti	C. L. Dheer	Geeta Bali, Amarnath, Vijayalaxmi, Leela Mishra, Jaswant, S Nasir, Rashid Khan	Family Drama	Music: S. D. Batish Lyrics: Kaifi Azmi, Vishwamitra Adil Parts was also among the box office success of 1953 starring Usha Kirin Dev Anand
Bhagyawan	Datta Dharmadhikari	Nirupa Roy, Balraj Sahni, Rattan Kumar, Radhakrishan, Yashodara Katju, Raja Nene		Music: Avinash Vyas Lyrics: Neelkanth Tiwari, Ramesh Gupta, Saraswati Kumar Deepak

== C–F ==
Title	Director	Cast	Genre	Music
Chacha Chowdhury	Raja Paranjape	Raja Paranjape, Shashikala, Durga Khote, Dhumal, S. Banerji, Maruti, Kamal Mehra	Family Comedy	Music: Lyrics:
Chalis Baba Ek Chor	P. L. Santoshi	Balraj Sahni, Kamini Kaushal, Smriti Biswas, David, Om Prakash Jagdeep, Radhakrishan	Social	Music: S. D. Burman Lyrics: Pyarelal Santoshi
Chandirani	P. Bhanumati	N. T. Rama Rao, P. Bhanumathi, Amarnath, K. Rani	Costume Drama	The film was produced in Telugu, Tamil and Hindi languages. Music: C. R. Subburaman, M. S. Viswanathan Lyrics: Vishwamitra Adil
Char Chand	A. Karim	Suresh, Shyama, Sheikh Mukhtar, Bhagwan, Ghulam Rasool, Altaf, Cuckoo, Manju	Social	Music: Naushad Lyrics: A. Karim
Chhoti Duniya	Uday Kumar	Uday Kumar, Leela Kumari, Asha, Moolji Khushal, Ashwin Roy, Sheela Naik	Social	Music: Rajhans Kataria Lyrics: Bekal
Daana Paani	V. M. Vyas	Bharat Bhushan, Meena Kumari, Chitra, Radhakrishan, Ulhas, Wasti, Veera, Shashi Kapoor	Social	Music: Mohan Junior Lyrics: Indeevar, Kaif Irfani
Daera	Kamal Amrohi	Meena Kumari, Nasir Khan, Jankidas, Kumar, Nana Palsikar, Pratima Devi, Roopmala, Kammo, N. A. Ansari	Social Drama	Music: Jamal Sen Lyrics: Majrooh Sultanpuri, Kaif Bhopali
Dard-e-Dil	Nitin Bose	Premnath, Nimmi, Murad, Meenaxi, Nawab Mazhar, Rattan Kumar, Pratima Devi	Family Drama	Music: R. C. Boral Lyrics: Hasrat Jaipuri, D. N. Madhok
Dharm Patni	Ramchandra Thakur	Mahipal, Nirupa Roy, Durga Khote, Kumar, Gope, Yashodara Katju, Moti Sagar	Family Drama	Music: Jamal Sen Lyrics: Bharat Vyas, Shewan Rizvi
Dhoon	M. Kumar	Raj Kapoor, Nargis, Kumar, Motilal, Cuckoo, Pramila, Gulab, E Billimoria, Kamal Mehra		Music: Madan Mohan Lyrics: Pyarelal Santoshi, Kaif Irfani, Bharat Vyas
Dhuaan	R. L. Malhotra	Balraj Sahni, Usha Kiran, Om Prakash, Jeevan, Pratima Devi, Ulhas, Jagdish Kanwal	Family Drama	Music: Dhaniram, Vasant Desai Lyrics: Rajendra Krishan
Dil-E-Nadaan	A. R. Kardar	Talat Mehmood, Shyama, Peace Kanwal, Dewan Sherar, S. N. Bannerjee, Shyam Kumar	Family Drama	Music: Ghulam Mohammad Lyrics: Shakeel Badayuni
Do Bigha Zamin	Bimal Roy	Balraj Sahni, Nirupa Roy, Rattan Kumar, Murad, Jagdeep, Nana Palsikar, Nazir Hussain, Meena Kumari	Social Drama	First film to win the Filmfare Best Movie Award. First Indian film to win the International Prize at the Cannes Film Festival. Music: Salil Choudhury Lyrics: Shailendra
Ek Do Teen	Roop K. Shorey	Motilal, Meena Shorey, Majnu, Yashodhara Katju, Iftekhar, Kaushalya	Comedy Romance Drama	Music: Vinod Lyrics: Aziz Kashmiri
Fareb	Shaheed Latif, Ismat Chugtai	Kishore Kumar, Shakuntala Paranjpye, Lalita Pawar, Zohra Sehgal, Amar, Maya Das	Social	Music: Anil Biswas Lyrics: Majrooh Sultanpuri
Farmaish	B. K. Sagar	Bharat Bhushan, Vijay Laxmi, Kuldip Kaur, Chandrashekhar Pran, Gope, Khairati, Maruti	Social	Music: Husanlal Bhagatram Lyrics: Qamar Jalalabadi, Khawar Zaman
Firdaus		Geeta Bali, Ashok Kumar, Anoop Kumar, Om Prakash, Lalita Pawar, Rama	Social Drama	Music: Robin Chatterjee Lyrics: D. N. Madhok Shailendra
Footpath	Zia Sarhadi	Dilip Kumar, Meena Kumari, Kuldip Kaur, Achala Sachdev, Anwar Hussain, Jankidas, Master Romi	Social	Music: Khayyam Lyrics: Majrooh Sultanpuri

== G–L ==
Title	Director	Cast	Genre	Music
Gharbaar	Dinkar Patil	Manhar Desai, Sulochana Chatterjee, Kuldip Kaur, Surendra, Shammi, Gope	Family Drama	Music: Vasant Prabhu Lyrics: Indeevar, D. N. Madhok, Kaif Irfani
Gul Sanobar	Aspi Irani	Shyama, Shammi Kapoor, Agha, Rajni, Jilloo, Nazir Kashmiri, Habib, Shakur	Costume	Music: Bulo C Rani, Khayyam Lyrics: Kaif Irfani, Raja Mehdi Ali Khan, Nazim Panipati
Gunah	Kidar Sharma	Geeta Bali, Jagdev, Manorama, Vijaylaxmi, Baby Naaz, Pratima Devi, Jankidas, Pesi Patel, Bir Sakuja, Tun Tun	Family Drama	Music: Snehal Bhatkar, Roshan Lyrics: Kidar Sharma
Hari Darshan	Raman B. Desai	Sapru, Leela Chitnis, Roopa Verman, Bipin Gupta, Jankidas, Moni Chatterjee	Devotional	Music: Shankar Vyas Lyrics: Ramesh Chandra Pandey, Ramesh Gupta, Kishore Pandey, Saraswati Kumar Deepak
Hazaar Raaten	Jayant Desai	Manhar Desai, Rehana, Bipin Gupta, Agha, Cuckoo	Fantasy	Music: Ghulam Mohammed Lyrics: Shakeel Badayuni
Humdard	S. Bhagat	Nimmi, Shekhar, Smriti Biswas, Shivraj, Yashodhara Katju, Gajanan Jagirdar, Rajan Kapoor	Social	Music: Anil Biswas Lyrics: Prem Dhawan, Majrooh Sultanpuri
Humsafar	A. N. Bannerjee	Dev Anand, Kalpana Kartik, Smriti Biswas, Chetan Anand, Johnny Walker, Mohan Sehgal, Krishan Dhawan		Music: Ali Akbar Khan Lyrics: Sahir Ludhianvi
Husn Ka Chor	JBH Wadia	Mahipal, Usha Kiran, Sardar Mansur, Babu Raje, B. M. Vyas, Dalpat, Lalita Kumari	Costume	Music: Bulo C. Rani Lyrics: Raja Mehdi Ali Khan
Jallianwalla Baag Ki Jyoti	R. S. Choudhary	Karan Dewan, Kamlesh Kumari, Achala Sachdev, David, Roopmala, Jagdish Sethi	Historical Drama	Music: Anil Biswas Lyrics: Prem Dhawan, Majrooh Sultanpuri, Uddhav Kumar, Rajendra Krishan, Partau Lakhnavi
Jeewan Jyoti	Mahesh Kaul	Shammi Kapoor, Shashikala, Leela Mishra, Chand Usmani, Nazir Hussain, Dulari, Moni Chatterjee	Social	Debut film of Shammi Kapoor. Music: S. D. Burman Lyrics: Sahir Ludhianvi
Jhamela	Bhagwan	Geeta Bali, Bhagwan, Anwar Hussain, Badri Prasad, Sunder	Action	Music: C. Ramachandra Lyrics: Rajendra Krishan
Jhansi Ki Rani	Sohrab Modi	Mehtab, Sohrab Modi, Shakila, Sapru, Mubarak, Ulhas, Nayampali	Historical	Music: Vasant Desai Lyrics: Pandit Radheshyam
Jungle Ka Jawahar	Homi Wadia	Fearless Nadia, John Cawas, Pramila, Nazir, Goldstein, Shapur	Costume Action Adventure	Music: Madhavlal Damodar Master Lyrics: Firoz Jalandhari, Saraswati Kumar Deepak
Khoj	Balwant Bhatt	Shammi Kapoor, Mahipal, Lalita Kumari, Shammi, Satish	Crime Double-role Drama	Music: Nisar Lyrics: Raja Mehdi Ali Khan, Hasrat Jaipuri, Anjum Jaipuri
Ladki	M. V. Raman	Vyjayantimala, Bharat Bhushan, Kishore Kumar Anjali Devi, V. Nagayya, Leela Mishra, Om Prakash, Raj Mehra and Master Chhotu	Romantic Comedy	Music: R. Sudarsanam, Dhaniram Lyrics: Rajendra Krishan
Laila Majnu	K. Amarnath	Shammi Kapoor, Nutan, Begum Para, Ulhas, Rattan Kumar, Kammo, Vasti, W. M. Khan	Legend Romance	Music: Ghulam Mohammed Lyrics: Shakeel Badayuni
Lehren	H. S. Rawail	Kishore Kumar, Shyama, Om Prakash, Leela Mishra, Sunder, Shakuntala Paranjpye, Bipin Gupta	Social	Music: C. Ramchandra Lyrics: Rajendra Krishan

== M–P ==
Title	Director	Cast	Genre	Music
Madmust	Jagdish Pant	Nirupa Roy, Shakila, Sapru A. N. Ansari, Shashikala, Mukri	Social	Music: V. Balsara Lyrics: Madhukar Rajasthani, Madhuraj, Maanav, J. C. Pant
Mahatma	Datta Dharamadhikari	David, Madan Puri, Raja Goswami, Dixit, Gajanan Jagirdar, Raja Nene	Social	Music: Vasant Pawar, Ram Vadhavkar Lyrics: Ehsan Rizvi
Malkin	O. P. Dutta	Sajjan, Nutan, Purnima, Durga Khote, Yakub, Pran Gope, Raj Mehra	Social Drama	Music: Roshan Lyrics: Rajendra Krishan
Mallika Soloni	Mohammed Hussain	Kamran, Krishna Kumari, Helen, Roopa Verman, Nazir Kashmiri, Amrit	Costume Action	Music: Iqbal, Krishna Dayal Lyrics: Faruk Kaiser
Manchala	Jayant Desai	Nirupa Roy, Manhar Desai, Krishna Kumari, Agha, Jeevan		Music: Chitragupta Lyrics: Raja Mehdi Ali Khan
Mashuqa	Shanti Kumar	Mukesh, Suraiya, Kuldip Kaur, Durga Khote, Agha, Amirbai Karnataki	Social Drama	Music: Roshan Lyrics: Shailendra, Qamar Jalalabadi
Mazi Zameen	Bhalji Pendharkar	Suryakant		Music: Vasant Desai Lyrics:
Mehmaan	Ramanand Sagar	Premnath, Nimmi, Sajjan, Purnima, Bikram Kapoor	Romantic Musical	Music: Anil Biswas Lyrics: Uddhav Kumar, P. N. Rangeen, Raja Mehdi Ali Khan
Naag Panchami	Ramesh Desai	Nirupa Roy, Manhar Desai, Bipin Gupta, B. M. Vyas, Durga Khote, Heera Sawant	Mythological	Music: Chitragupta Lyrics: Gopal Singh Nepali
Naina	Ravindra Dave	Abhi Bhattacharya, Geeta Bali, Leela Mishra, Ramesh Sinha, Narmada Shankar, Khairati	Social Drama	Music: Manna Dey, Ghulam Mohammed Lyrics: Uddhav, Anjum, Pyarelal Santoshi
Naulakha Haar	H. S. Bhatt	Meena Kumari, Nirupa Roy, Jeevan, Sunder, Ishwarlal, Durga Khote, Arvind Kumar	Fantasy Drama	Music: Bhola Shreshtha Lyrics: Bharat Vyas
Nav Durga	Babubhai Mistri	Mahipal, Usha Kiran, Amarnath, Sulochana Chatterjee, S. N. Tripathi, Dalpat, Maruti	Devotional	Music: S. N. Tripathi Lyrics: Anjum Jaipuri, Rameshchandra Pandey
Naya Ghar	D.D. Kashyap	Geeta Bali, Shekhar, Begum Para, Jagdev, Leela Chitnis, Rattan Kumar	Family Drama	Music: Shankar Jaikishan Lyrics: Hasrat Jaipuri, Shailendra
Naya Raasta	Jayant Desai	Nirupa Roy, Manhar Desai, Krishna Kumari, Agha, Bipin Gupta	Social	Music: Chitragupta Lyrics: Raja Mehdi Ali Khan
Paheli Shaadi	Ram Daryani	Bharat Bhushan, Nargis, Motilal, Gope, Leela Mishra, Manorama, Kammo	Social Family Drama	Music: Robin Chatterjee Lyrics: Kaif Irfani, D. N. Madhok
Papi	Chandulal Shah	Raj Kapoor, Nargis, Maruti, Dulari, Dulari, Amarnath, Jagdeep	Social	Music: S. Mohinder Lyrics: Rajendra Krishan, Raja Mehdi Ali Khan, Sarshar Sailani, Hasrat Jaipuri, Surjit Sethi, Butaram Sharma
Parineeta	Bimal Roy	Meena Kumari, Ashok Kumar, Asit Baran, Nazir Hussain, Pratima Devi, Badri Prasad	Social Romance	Music: Arun Kumar Mukherjee Lyrics: Bharat Vyas
Patita	Amiya Chakravarty	Usha Kiron, Dev Anand, Lalita Pawar, Agha, Krishnakant, Tiwari, B. M. Vyas	Family Drama	Music: Shankar Jaikishan Lyrics: Shailendra, Hasrat Jaipuri-"Yaad Kiya Dilne Kahaan Ho Tum"

== R–Z ==
Title	Director	Cast	Genre	Music
Rahi	K. A. Abbas	Dev Anand, Nalini Jaywant, Balraj Sahni, David, Shaukat Hashmi, Rasheed, Habib	Social	Music: Anil Biswas Lyrics: Prem Dhawan, Dashrath Lal
Rail Ka Dibba	P. N. Arora	Shammi Kapoor, Madhubala, Jayant, Sajjan, Om Prakash, Cuckoo, Ram Avtar, Amar, Pratima Devi	Social Drama	Music: Ghulam Mohammed Lyrics: Shakeel Badayuni
Raj Mahal	Nanubhai Vakil	Shakila, Trilok Kapoor, Murad, Ram Singh, Tun Tun, Murad, W. M. Khan	Costume Action	Music: Gobind Ram, G. P. Kapoor Lyrics: Munshi Dil, Nandini Mahendra
Raj Ratan	Hiren Bose	Abhi Bhattacharya, Kamini Kaushal, Sulochand Chatterji, Leela Chitnis, Ramesh Vyas	Drama	Music: Neenu Majumdar Lyrics: Bharat Vyas
Rami Dhobhan	Indu Kumar	Nirupa Roy, P. Jairaj, Trilok Kapoor, Ranjana, Ullhas, Sapru	Devotional	Music: Hiren Bose Lyrics: Ram Murti
Rangila	Bhagwan	Bhagwan, Purnima, Nazira Baburao, Indira, Badri Prasad, Vivek, Inamdar	Action	Music: Jamal Sen Lyrics: S. H. Bihari, Ehsan Rizvi
Shagufa	H. S. Rawail	Premnath, Bina Rai, Purnima, Yashodhara Katju, Rajendra Nath, Naaz, Bipin Gupta, Gopi Krishna, Sunder	Social Drama	Music: C. Ramchandra Lyrics: Rajendra Krishan
Shahenshah	Amiya Chakravarty	Kamini Kaushal, Ranjan, Shakila, K. N. Singh, Achala Sachdev, Agha, Mukri, Cuckoo	Costume Action	Music: S. D. Burman Lyrics: Sahir Ludhianvi
Shamsheer	Gyan Mukerjee	Ashok Kumar, P. Bhanumati, Bhagwan, Mehmood, Smriti Biswas, Vasantro Pahelwan, Vishwas Kunte, Nana Palsikar	Action Drama	Music: Arun Kumar, Anupam Ghatak Lyrics: Vrajendra Gaur, Madhur, Nazish Sikandarpuri
Shamsherbaaz	Noshir Engineer	Fearless Nadia, John Cawas, Habib, Shanti Madhok, Sardar Mansur	Action Costume	Music: Shafi Nagri
Shikast	Ramesh Saigal	Dilip Kumar, Nalini Jaywant, Durga Khote, Om Prakash, K. N. Singh		Music: Shankar Jaikishan Lyrics: Hasrat Jaipuri, Shailendra
Shole	B. R. Chopra	Ashok Kumar, Bina Rai, Purnima, Jeevan, Manmohan Krishna, Mirza Musharaf, Master Romi, Naaz	Family Social Drama	Music: Dhaniram, Naresh Bhattacharya Lyrics: Kamil Rashid, Saraswati Kumar Deepak, Sahir Ludhianvi, Majrooh Sultanpuri
Shri Chaitanya Mahaprabhu	Vijay Bhatt	Bharat Bhushan, Ameeta, Durga Khote, Madan Puri, Kanhaiyalal, Umakant, B. M. Vyas	Biopic Devotional	Music: R. C. Boral Lyrics: Bharat Vyas
Shuk Rambha	Dhirubhai Desai	Nirupa Roy, Bharat Bhushan, Anjali Devi, Krishna Kumari, Raj Kumari, Niranjan Sharma, Ishwarlal, Lalita Pawar	Fantasy	Music: Manna Dey Lyrics: Bharat Vyas
Suhag Sindoor	Colin Pal	Shyama, Asit Baran, Yashodara Katju, Lekha, Asit Sen	Family Drama	Music: Shailesh Mukherjee, Suresh Kumar Lyrics: Bharat Vyas, Suresh Tripathi
Surang	V. Shantaram	Vinod Kumar, Sheila Ramani, Shashikala, Keshavrao Date, Ulhas, Chandrashekhar, Vikas	Social	Music: Shivram Krishna Lyrics: Shewan Rizvi
Teen Batti Char Raasta	V. Shantaram	Sandhya, Shashikala, Karan Dewan, Sheila Ramani, Smriti Biswas, Nirupa Roy, Keshavrao Date, Ishwarlal, Parshuram	Family Drama Social	Music: Shivram Krishna Lyrics: Pyarelal Santoshi
Thokar	Lekhraj Bhakri	Shammi Kapoor, Shyama, Lalita Pawar, Ravindra Kapoor, Johnny Whiskey, Paro Devi	Social	Music: Sardar Malik Lyrics: Raja Mehdi Ali Khan, Majaz Lucknavi, Prem Dhawan
