= List of Hindi films of 1939 =

A list of films produced by the Bollywood film industry based in Mumbai in 1939:

== 1939 ==
Some of the noteworthy films of 1939:

- Pukar was a historical drama directed by Sohrab Modi for his own banner Minerva Movietone based on Jehangir's fair sense of justice. It was the most successful film of 1939. The film was one of the first to use spectacular sets and it was also Kamal Amrohi's first film as a scriptwriter. The film starred Chandra Mohan as Jehangir, with Naseem Banu and Sohrab Modi.
- Aadmi was a remake of the Marathi film Manoos (1939) and is regarded as a classic from Prabhat Film Company. The film starring Shahu Modak and Shanta Hublikar was a "reformist social melodrama" directed by V. Shantaram.
- Dushman starring K. L. Saigal, Leela Desai and Prithviraj Kapoor was directed by Nitin Bose for New Theatres based on an idea suggested by Lady Lithgow to spread awareness of tuberculosis. The social aspect used with a romantic triangle and Saigal's songs made it a notable film.

== A–B ==
Title	Director	Cast	Genre	Notes
Aadmi	V. Shantaram	Shanta Hublikar, Shahu Modak, Ram Marathe, Baba Saheb, Ganpat Rao, Gauri	Social	Music: Master Krishnarao
Aap Ki Marzi	Sarvottam Badami	Motilal, Khursheed, Sabita Devi, Mazhar Khan, Vasanti, K. N. Singh, Sunalini Devi	Social	Music: Gyan Dutt; Lyrics: Pyare Lal Santoshi, S. P. Kalla
Actress Kyon Bani	G. R. Sethi	Usha Rani, Ashiq Hussain, Padma Devi, Rafiqe Ghaznavi, W. M. Khan, Abdul, Mukhtar	Social	Music: Ram Gopal Pande
Adhuri Kahani	Chaturbhuj Doshi	Rose, Prithviraj Kapoor, Durga Khote, Keshavrao Date, Ishwarlal, Mira, Mirza Musharraf, Lala Yaqub	Social	Music: Gyan Dutt; Lyrics: J. S. Kashyap
Alladin Ka Beta	Nanubhai Vakil	Sarojini, Ganpat, Shankar, Bose, Ali, Razaq, Mirajkar	Action Adventure Fantasy	Music: Damodar Sharma
Badi Didi	Amar Mullick	Molina, Pahari Sanyal, Bikram Kapoor, Nawab, Renuka Devi, Menaka Devi, Kidar Sharma, G. K. Rampuri, Bela, Jagdish Sethi, Zainab, Gulab	Social	Music: Pankaj Mullick; Lyrics: Kidar Sharma
Baghi	Dhirubhai Desai	Mehtab, Shamim, Anil Kumar, Ashraf Khan, Samson, Amirbai Karnataki, Anwaribai, Shiraj	Costume	Vishnu Cine. Music: Shanti Kumar Desai; Lyrics: G. S. Akhtar Poster link
Bahadur Ramesh	K. Amarnath	Yasmin, Nazir, Rajkumari, Jeevan, Sadiq Nawab, S. Nazir, Devaskar, Ghulam Rasool, Haroon	Action	Mohan Pictures. Music: B. R. Batish; Lyrics: Ehsan Rizvi
Bhedi Kumar	Chunilal Parekh	Urmila, Yashwant Dave, Indurani, Mishra, Vasantrao Pehalwan, Sadiq Nawab, Ghulam Qadir	Action	Mohan Pics. Music: B. R. Btish; Lyrics: B. P. Mathur
Bhole Bhale	Zia Sarhadi	Prem Adib, Maya, Arun Kumar, Bibbo, Jyoti, Kayam Ali, Bhudo Advani, Kanhaiyalal, Putlibai	Social	Music: Anupam Ghatak; Lyrics:Zia Sarhadi, Kanhaiyalal
Bijli	Balwant Bhatt	P. Jairaj, Pramila, Shyam Sunder, Munshi Khanjar, Athavale	Action	Prakash Prod. Music: Shankar Rao Vyas, Lallubhai Nayak; Lyrics: Pandit Anuj
Brandy Ki Botal	Master Vinayak	Meenakshi, Master Vinayak, Damuanna Malvankar, Salvi, V. Jog, Javdekar	Social	Music: Chandekar; Lyrics: Pandit Indra Chandra

== C–F ==
Title	Director	Cast	Genre	Notes
Chashmawali	K. Amarnath	Ashiq Hussain, Indurani, S. Nazir, Indira, Lobo, Varne, Azar Ansari, Sadiq, S. Nazir, Anwaribai	Action	Mohan Pics. Music: B. R. Batish; Lyrics: Safdar Aah Sitapuri
Chhotisi Duniya	B. S. Rajhans	Leela Chitnis, P. Jairaj, Rajhans, Ram Punjwani, Gulshan Sufi	Social	Ray Pictures. Music: Ram T. Heera; Lyrics:
Comrades	Nandlal Jaswantal	Surendra, Harish, Jyoti, Maya	Social	
Criminal	Bhagwan	Bhagwan, Hansa Wadkar, Vasantrao Pehalwan, Masood, Chandrarao, Sunetra	Action	Chandra Art. Music: A. Hussain; Lyrics:
Daughters Of India	V. M. Vyas	Khursheed, Ashiq Hussain, Radha Devi, Vimla Devi, Abdul, Mukhtar, Jahangir	Social	Super Pictures. Music: Ram Gopal Pande; Lyrics: Munshi Aziz
Dekha Jayega	O. P. Khanna	Amarnath, Lillian, Kamran, Nasreen	Action	Marvel Production. Music: Sardul Kwatra; Lyrics: Farook Qaiser
Dil Hi To Hai	Kidar Sharma	Ramola Devi, Amarnath, Prem Kumari, Gyani, S K Ojha, Gyani, Nand Kishore, Rajinder Singh, Ram Dulari	Social	Film Corporation of India. Music: B. Chatterjee; Lyrics: Kidar Sharma
Durga	Franz Osten	Devika Rani, Hansa Wadkar, Balwant Singh, Rama Shukul, P. F. Pithawala, Mumtaz Ali, Saroj Borkar, V. H. Desai, Nana Palsikar, Haroon		Bombay Talkies. Music: Saraswati Devi; Lyrics: Narottam Vyas, Narendranath Tuli,
Dushman	Nitin Bose	K. L. Saigal, Leela Desai, Najamul Hassan, Prithviraj Kapoor, Manorama Sr., Devbala, Jagdish Sethi, Dhumi Khan, Shiraz Faruk, Bikram Kapoor	Social Romance Drama	New Theatres. Music: Pankaj Mullick; Lyrics:
Flying Rani	Aspi Irani	Khursheed, Yashwant Dave, Husn Banu, Anant Marathe, Urmila, Muktar, Munshi Khanjar	Action	Wadia Movietone. Music: Ram Gopal Pande; Lyrics:

== G–J ==
Title	Director	Cast	Genre	Notes
Garib Ka Lal	V. M. Vyas	Kokila, Navinchandra, Ghulam Mohammed, Mirza Musharraf, Kamla Kumari, F. M. Butt	Action	Jaibharat. Music: Sagar Asif; Lyrics: Kabil Amritsari, Rafi Kashmiri
Ghazi Salahuddin	L. A. Hafizji	Mazhar Khan, Rattan Bai, Lalita Devi, Yakub, Ishwarlal, W. M. Khan, Kalyani, Gulam Mohammed, Mohammed Ishaq, Mirza Mushrraf	Historical Drama	Supreme Pictures. Music: Khemchand Prakash; Lyrics:
Hero No. 1	Balwant Bhatt	Umakant, Shirin, Jayant, Anant Marathe, Munshi Khanjar, Athavale, Shyam Sunder, M. Zahur, Gulab	Action	Prakash Pictures. Music: Lallubhai Nayak; Lyrics: Pandit Amuj
Hukum Ka Ekka	Shanti Dave	Umakant Pramila, Shyam Sunder, Anant Marathe Lallubhai, M. Zahur, Gulab	Action	Prakash Pictures. Music: Shankar Rao Vyas; Lyrics: Lallubhai Nayak, Pandit Anuj
Imandar	G. R. Sethi	Anil Kumar, Shamim Akhtar, Noor Jehan, Zubeida, Shahzadi, Fazlu, Mukhtar, Pir Mohammed, Anwaribai	Action	Vishnu. Music: Shanti Kumar Desai; Lyrics: G. R. Sethi
Imperial Mail	Safdar Mirza	Shahjehan, Gulzar, Sunder, Gulab	Action	India Movies. Music: Prem Kumar, S. P. Rane; Lyrics: Safdar Mirza
India In Africa a.k.a. Africa Mein Hind	Hiren Bose	Urmila, Nandrekar, S. N. Bannerjee, Vidya Devi, Mitra, Tripathi	Action	Adarsha Chitra. Music: Sudhir Bose, Sudhir Ghosh Dastidar; Lyrics: G. P. Shakal
Jawani Ki Reet	Hemchandra Chunder	Kanan Devi, Najmul Hussain, Jagdish Sethi, Chhabirani, Nemo Bipin Gupta, Kalavati, Nand Kishore, Bikram Kapoor, A. H. Shore	Social	New Theatres. Music: R. C. Boral; Lyrics: Arzu Lucknavi
Josh-e-Islam	Daud	Nazir, Pushparani, Bipin Gupta, Kalavati, Nand Kishore Sunder, Baburao	Action	Indira Movies. Music: Lyrics:
Juari	G. K. Mehta	P. Jairaj, Nirmala Devi, Chand Kumari, Shanta Dutt, Gulshan Sufi, R. T. Hira, B. R. Sharma	Social	Ray Pics. Music: R. T. Hira; Lyrics: Ehsan Rizvi, Darpan
Jungle King	Nari Ghadiali	John Cawas, Pramila, Dilawar, Dalpat, Agha, Shah Nawaz, Nazira, Bismillah	Action	Wadia Movietone. Music: Master Madhavlal Damodar; Lyrics: Munshi Shyam

== K–M ==
Title	Director	Cast	Genre	Notes
Kahan Hai Manzil Teri	S.M.Yusuf	Benjamin, Radharani, Harishchandra, Urmila, Shah Nawaz, Ila Devi, Sayani Atish, Agha, Dalpat, Nazira	Action	Wadia Movietone. Music: Master Madhavlal Damodar; Lyrics: Waheed Qureshi
Kala Jigar	A. M. Khan	Akbar Nawaz, Daya Devi, Chandrakant, Miss Iqbal, Zohra, Gulab, Lily, Rajpal, S. Nazir	Action	Mohan Pictures. Music: Bashir; Lyrics: Munshi Nayab
Kangan	Franz Osten	Ashok Kumar, Leela Chitnis, Mubarak, Balwant Singh, Ranibala, Saroj Borkar, Jagdish Sethi, Kamlesh Kumari, Najam, Sarla Kumari	Social	Bombay Talkies. Music: Saraswati Devi; Lyrics: Kabir, Kavi Pradeep
Kapala Kundla	Nitin Bose, Phani Majumdar	Sailen Choudhury, Leela Desai, Najmul Hussain, Pankaj Mullick, Kamlesh Kumari, Manorama	Social Romantic Drama	New Theatres. Based on Bankim Chandra Chattopadhyay novel Kapalkundala. Mullick song:"Piya Milan Ko Jaana". Music: Pankaj Mullick; Lyrics: Arzu Lucknavi, A. R. Shore
Kaun Kisi Ka	C. Luhar	Shobhana Samarth, Khursheed, Padma Devi, Nazir, Mubarak, Gope, K. N. Singh, Maruti Rao, Bibijan	Social	Hindustan. Rafiqe Ghaznavi. Music: Lyrics: Munshi Dil
Khooni Jadugar	Roop K. Shorey	M. Esmail, Hiralal, Usharani, Majnu, Charlie, Kanwal, Kanti	Action Costume	Kamla Movies. Music: Gobind Ram; Lyrics: Roop K. Shorey
Ladies Only	Sarvottam Badami	Surendra, Sabita Devi, Bibbo, Harish, Kaushalya, Bhudo Advani, Prabha Devi, Sunalini Devi, Pande	Social	Sagar Movietone. Music: Anupam Ghatak; Lyrics: Zia Sarhadi, Pandit Indra
Leatherface a.k.a. Farzande Watan	Vijay Bhatt	P. Jairaj, Mehtab, Putlibai, Shirin, Jal Writer, M. Zahoor, Lallubhai Nayak, Shyam Sunder, Munshi Khanjar, Baby Meena Kumari	Action	Praksh. Music: Shankar Rao Vyas; Lyrics: Lallubhai Nayak, Pandit Anuj
Madhu Bansari	K. Desai	Shankar Vazre, Sarojini, Vatsala Kumtekar, Bose, Mirajkar, Mehrunnisa, Ganpat, Pukhraj, Mansur	Action	Paramount. Music: Damodar Sharma; Lyrics:
Marad a.k.a. Murad	Saqi	P. Jairaj, Khursheed, Moti, Shamrao, Hari Shivdasani, Mehdi Raja	Action	Sarla Cinetone. Music: Lyrics:
Mera Haq	P. Y. Altekar	Minakshi, Vimla Sardesai, Damuanna Malvankar, Baburao Pendharkar, Usha Mantri, D. S. Salvi, Vishnupant Jog	Social	Huns Pics. Music: K. Dutta; Lyrics: Pandit Anand Kumar
Mera Watan	Inamdar	Nirmala Devi, Ayesha Banu, Inamdar, Chanchal Kumari, Maruti, Azurie	Actiom	Challenge Pics. Music: Chapekar, Hindlekar; Lyrics: Kabil Amritsari
Meri Ankhen	Dwarka Khosla	Trilok Kapoor, Khursheed, Sitara Devi, Mazhar Khan, Ishwarlal, Suresh, Bhagwandas, Kesari	Social	Supreme. Music: Khemchand Prakash; Lyrics: Pyare Lal Santoshi
Midnight Mail	K. Amarnath	Yasmin, Nazir, Shiraz, Indurani, Chandrakant, S. Nazir, Gulab, P. Varne, Ghulam Mohammed, Ghulam Qadir	Action	Mohan Pics. Music: B. R. Batish; Lyrics: Safdar Faizpuri

== N–R ==
Title	Director	Cast	Genre	Notes
Nadi Kinare	Manibhai Vyas	Kumar, Sitara Devi, Charlie, Ghory, Sunita, Indubala, Ram Marathe, Bhagwandas, Ibrahim	Social	Ranjit Studios. Music: : Gyan Dutt; Lyrics: Pyare Lal Santoshi, D. N. Madhok
Navjivan	Franz Osten	Hansa Wadkar, Rama Shukul, V.H. Desai, Mumtaz Ali, P. F. Pithawala, Saroj Borkar, M. Nazir, Lalita Devulkar, Pratima	Social	Bombay Talkies. Music: Sarswati Devi; Lyrics: J. S. Kashyap
Pati Patni	Gunjal	Shobhana Samarth, Yakub, Sitara Devi, Mirza Musharraf, Shama, Joshi, Ameena, Balabhai, K. N. Singh, Wasti	Social Family Drama	General Films. Music: H. C. Bali, Mushtaq Hussain; Lyrics: Pyare Lal Santoshi
Payam-e-Haq	Dhirubhai Desai	Ashiq Hussain, Anil Kumar, Ansuya, Noor Jehan, Samson, Anwaribai, Ashraf Khan, Fazlu, P. R. Joshi, Gulshan Sufi	Action	Vishnu. Music: Zhande Khan, Shyam Babu Pathak; Lyrics: Kabil Amritsari
Prem Ki Jyot	Gunjal	Dinshaw Billimoria, Sulochana, Jal Merchant, Jamshedji, Maruti Rao, Jamuna, Adjania, Lakshmi	Social	Ruby Pics. Music: Lyrics:
Prem Sagar	Narottam Vyas	Paresh Banerji, Kokila, Indubala, Pahelwan, Hasanaddin, Rampyari, Leelabai	Social	Mahalaxmi Cinetone. Music: Ramchandra Pal; Lyrics: Narottam Vyas
Pucce Badmash a.k.a. Secret Five	A. H. Essa	Jal Merchant, Vatsala Kumtekar, Maruti Rao, Gangoo, Bhim, Jamshedji	Action	Rex Pics. Music: Vasant Kumar Naidu; Lyrics: Ratan Piya
Pukar	Sohrab Modi	Chandra Mohan, Naseem Banu, Sohrab Modi, Sardar Akhtar, Sheela, Ghulam Hussain, Sadiq, Jilloobai, Shakir, Ram Apte	Historical Drama	Minerva Movietone. Music: Mir Sahib; Lyrics: Kamal Amrohi
Punjab Mail	Homi Wadia	Fearless Nadia, John Cawas, Boman Shroff, Sardar Mansur, Master Mohammed, Shahzadi, Sayani Atish, Sarita Devi, Nazira, Mithu Miyan	Action	Wadia Movietone Music: Master Madhavlal Damodar; Lyrics: Pandit Gyan Chandra
Ran Sangram	A. M. Khan	Chandrakant, Kanta Kumari, Ameena, Nawaz, Shahzadi, Sadiq, Haroon, Anwaribai	Action	Mohan Pictures. Music: Fazal, Bashir; Lyrics: A. M. Khan
Ratna Lutari	A. M. Khan	Ramola, Chandrakant Desai, Shahzadi, Ameena, Mehdi Raja, Haroon, Kanta Kumari, Anwaribai	Action	Mohan Pictures. Music: Bashir, Fazal; Lyrics:
Rukmini	Bhola Addi	Pratima Das Gupta, Nimbalkar, Ansari, Panna, Nand Kishore, Devbala, Muzammil, Jahar	Devotional	Deb Dutta Films. Music: Fazal; Lyrics:

== S–Z ==
Title	Director	Cast	Genre	Notes
Sach Hai	S. A. Choudhary	Motilal, Rose, Shakir, Usharani, Ramakrishna Choubhe, Chandani, Baba Vyas, Danve	Social	Saraswati Cinetone. Music: Sureshbabu Mane; Lyrics: Niranjan Sharma
Sadhana	Virendra Desai and Mahendra Thakore	Prem Adib, Shobhana Samarth, Kaushalya, Harish, Bibbo, Kanhaiyalal, Pande, Putlibai	Social	Sagar Movietone. Music: Anupam Ghatak; Lyrics: Kanhaiyalal Chaturvedi
Sadhu Ya Shaitan	M. D. Shah	Madhavrao, Lekhraj, Kumari Mukta, Satyapal, Yaseem, Shamsudin	Action Suspense	D. C. Ent. Music: Abdul Karim; Lyrics:
Sansar Naiya	H. Mehta, Nanubhai Vakil	Sarojini, Navinchandra, Noor Jehan, S. L. Puri, Sardar Mansur, Sheela, Kanta Kumari, Dhulia, Mirajkar	Social	Paramount. Music: Damodar Sharma; Lyrics: Pandit Anuj
Sansar Sagar	Bapurao Apte	Noor Jehan, Manohar, Madhav Kale, Indira Wadkar	Social	National Pics. Music: B. S. Hoogan; Lyrics: J. S. Kashyap
Sant Tulsidas	Jayant Desai	Vishnupant Pagnis, Leela Chitnis, Vasanti, Keshavrao Date, Dixit, Ram Marathe, Sushila	Biopic Devotional	Ranjit Movietone Music: Gyan Dutt; Lyrics: Pyare Lal Santoshi
Sapera	Debaki Bose	Kanan Devi, Pahari Sanyal, Prithviraj Kapoor, Nawab, Shyam Laha, K. C. Dey, Satya Mukhopadhyay, Bikram Kapoor	Costume	New Theatres Music: R. C. Boral; Lyrics: Kidar Sharma
Service Ltd.	C. M. Luhar	Surendra, Bibbo, Yakub, Maya Banerjee, Kayam Ali, Harish, Zia Sarhadi, Bhudo Advani, Sankatha Prasad, Kalyani Das	Social Comedy Suspense	Sagar Movietone. Music: Anupam Ghatak; Lyrics: Zia Sarhadi and Pt.Indra
Sitara	Ezra Mir	Nazir, Rattan Bai, Khursheed, K. N. Singh, Mubarak, Jamshedji, Sunalini Devi, Ashiq Hussain, Violet Cooper, Mirza Musharraf, Nazir Bedi, Bibijan	Social	Everest Pictures Music: Rafiqe Ghaznavi; Lyrics: Munshi Dil
Son Of Alladin	Nanubhai Vakil	Sarojini, Shankar Vazare, Ranibala, Sardar Mansur, Ganpat Rao	Action Fantasy	Paramount. Music: Damodar Sharma; Lyrics:
Sunheri Toli	Kikubhai Desai	Navinchandra, Moti, Sardar Mansur, Shahzadi, Bose, Miss Pokhraj, Bansi Karnataki, Mirajkar, Dhulia	Action	Paramount. Music: Damodar Sharma; Lyrics:
Swastik	Mohan Sinha	Sushil Kimar, Veena, Jeevan, Indurani, Nazir Bedi, Dhulia, Madhu Bala, Fakir Mohammed, Mehdi Raza	Social	Mohan Pics. Music: Lyrics:
Taqdeer Ki Tope	V. Panchotia	Husn Banu, Wasti, V. Panchotia, Jyotsna Gupte, Waheedan Bai, Dixit, Ram Marathe, Suresh, K. Singh, Master Nissar, Fakir Mohammed, Narmada Shankar	Action	Bharat Laxmi Pictures. Music: Brijlal Varma; Lyrics: Pandit Bhushan
Thokar	Abdul Rashid Kardar	Kumar, Madhuri, Ishwarlal, Noor Mohammed Charlie, Yakub, Waheedan Bai, Wasti, K. N. Singh	Social	Ranjit Movietone. Music: Gyan Dutt; Lyrics: Pyare Lal Santoshi
Thunder	A. H. Essa	E. Billimoria, Mehar Sultana, Ramola, W. M. Khan, Ghory, Dixit, Jal Merchant, Bibijan	Action	Rex Pics. Music: Vasant Kumar Naidu; Lyrics: Munshi Shefta
Tumhari Jeet a.k.a. The Rise	Ranjit Sen	Chhaya Devi, Ramola, Kamran, Nand Kishore, Rajinder Singh, Devbala, Ram Dulari, Muzammil, Amarnath	Social	Music: B. Chatterjee; Lyrics: Kidar Sharma
Uski Tamanna a.k.a. Her Last Desire	Yakub	Maya, Yakub, Surish, Jyoti, Ishwarlal, Wasti, Charlie, Madhuri, Kumar, Waheedan, Dixit, Ram Marathe, K. Singh, Putlibai	Social	Sagar Movietone. Music: Anupam Ghatak; Lyrics: Pandit Indra
Watan Ke Liye	M. Udwadia	Navinchandra, Mohini, Gope, Hari Shivdasani, Kamala, Mirza Musharraf	Social	Vanraj Pics. Music: Lyrics: Munshi Dil
Zambo Ka Beta	M. Bhavnani	Navin Yagnik, Bimla Kumari, Sunita Devi, Vatsala Kumtekar, David, A. S. Gyani, Gulzar, Nayampalli, Fatty Prasad, Gulab	Action Adventure	Bhavnani Productions. Music: Badri Prasad; Lyrics: Pandit Shiv Kumar
