= Zimbo (film) =

- Directed by: Homi Wadia
- Written by: JBH Wadia
- Screenplay by: JBH Wadia
- Produced by: Basant Pictures
- Starring: Azad; Chitra; Krishna Kumari; Sheikh
- Cinematography: Anant Wadadeker
- Edited by: Kamlaker
- Music by: Chitragupta
- Production company: Basant Studios
- Release date: 22 August 1958
- Running time: 142 min
- Country: India
- Language: Hindi

Zimbo is a 1958 Hindi action adventure film directed by Homi Wadia and produced by Basant Pictures. John Cawas, the earlier hero of most Wadia Movietone adventure films is credited in the title role of the film as associate director, with special effects by Babubhai Mistry. The screenplay was by JBH Wadia with dialogues by Chand Pandit. The music was composed by Chitragupta, with lyrics by Majrooh Sultanpuri. The film starred Azad, Krishna Kumari, Chitra, Achala Sachdev, Sheikh and Dalpat.

The story idea was similar to Tarzan of the Apes; Homi Wadia made use of a "popular culture" icon like Tarzan and changed the name to Zimbo, with an Indian setting. The film was originally made in 1937 as Toofani Tarzan, directed by Homi Wadia and produced by Wadia Movietone.

The film was dubbed into Tamil with the same title and released in 1958. Aaroor Dass wrote the dialogues and Kuyilan penned the lyrics. Adapted music was composed by VijayaBhaskar. The dubbing was done at Film Centre, Chennai. Editing of the Tamil version was done by M. Thaththaiah and G. Venkataraman.

== Plot ==
Professor Chakravarty and his wife Uma (Achala Sachdev) live with their four-year-old son in the jungle where he carries out experiments. He has discovered the formula to prevent ageing. Adversity strikes when their house is attacked by lions, killing him, while his wife goes mad with grief. The professor's son goes missing in the melee. The story then follows the arrival of several people seventeen years later from the city. One of them is the Professor's brother who has traveled to the jungle with his daughter in search of the missing formula and to look for the professor's son. There are villains in the group of people, wanting the formula for their own purposes. Chakravarty's son Zimbo has been brought up by the apes and the story takes a turn when they try to relocate him with Dada (Pedro the Chimpanzee) to the city.

== Cast ==
- Azad as Zimbo
- Krishna Kumari as Queen Maya
- Chitra as Leela Devi
- Pedro the Chimpanzee as Dada
- Archala Sachdev as Uma Chakravarty, Azad's mother
- Sheikh as Chalak
- Dalpat as Seth Durgadas
- B. M. Vyas as Biharilal
- Pedro the Chimpanzee
- Uma Dutt as Rajguru
- Sardar Mansoor as Dilawar
- Adeeb
- Habib

== Production ==
The film had special effects by Babubhai Mistry. Zimbo was a loose remake of Wadia Brother's Toofani Tarzan (1937), which did not have an ape. This time the main attraction of the film was Pedro the chimpanzee, also called the Ape Bomb. Pedro, called Dada in the film, wore female clothes for comic effects and got to handle a gun in the end. According to Rajesh Devraj, the film became a success at the box office.

== Music ==
The music was composed by Chitragupta, with the lyrics written by Majrooh Sultanpuri. The singers were Mohammed Rafi, Geeta Dutt, Asha Bhosle and Usha Mangeshkar.

=== Songlist ===
#	Title	Singer
1	"Ye Raat Hai Mahtabi Sama Hai Diwana"	Asha Bhosle
2	"Lo Chale Hum Behke Kadam"	Asha Bhosle
3	"O Zalima Chala Kaha"	Mohammed Rafi
4	"Ye Rate Aaha Ye Bate"	Geeta Dutt
5	"Ye Kiya Tune Kaisa Jadu"	Asha Bhosle
6	"So Ja Re Mere Rajdulare"	
7	"Ye Mana Dil Jise Dhunde Badi Mushkil Se Milta Hai"	Mohammed Rafi

=== Songlist (Tamil) ===
Music by Vijaya Bhaskar. Lyrics were penned by Kuyilan.

#	Title	Singer
1	"Naan Raani"	Jikki, group
2	"Avar Ninaivum En Ninaivum"	P. Susheela
3	"Nammaasai Enra Nal Rojaa"	P. B. Sreenivas
4	"Ullaasama Jalsaa Seydhe"	S. C. Krishnan
5	"En Nenjam Unnai Agalaadhu"	P. Susheela
6	"En Aattaththai Paarkkaamal"	Jikki, group
7	"Kodaanu Kodi Per Kaathirunthaare"	S. Janaki

=== Songlist (Telugu) ===
Music by Chitragupt and Vijaya Bhaskar. Lyrics were penned by Sri Sri.

#	Title	Singer
1	"Rerani Ye Musthabai"	K. Jamuna Rani
2	"Avunu Nijam"	P. Susheela
3	"Ee Maayaa Jagathin"	P. B. Sreenivas
4	"Soggaadamma"	Pithapuram Nageswara Rao
5	"Ee Katha Idhi Kala Kaadhu"	P. Susheela
6	"Naa Aata Naa Pata"	K. Jamuna Rani
7	"O Chinni Rojaamaalaa"	S. Janaki
