= Hunterwali Ki Beti =

- Directed by: Batuk Bhatt
- Starring: Fearless Nadia
- Release date: 1943
- Country: India
- Language: Hindi

Hunterwali Ki Beti is a Bollywood film. It was released in 1943, and is the sequel to the 1935 film Hunterwali. Both films starred Fearless Nadia as the heroine and were produced by the Wadia brothers JBH and Homi (Nadia's husband) of Wadia Movietone. It was the first Indian movie to have sequel.
