= Vanaraja Karzan =

1938 film directed by Homi Wadia

- Poster
- Directed by: Homi Wadia; Nari Ghadiali
- Screenplay by: S. R. Krishnaswamy Iyengar
- Story by: J. B. H. Wadia
- Starring: John Cawas; K. R. Chellam
- Cinematography: Rustum Maybar; Bali Mistry
- Music by: "Yanai" Anantharama Iyer; Vaithyanatha Iyer
- Production companies: Wadia Movitone; Madras United Artists Corporation
- Release date: 4 June 1938
- Running time: 160 minutes
- Country: India
- Languages: Tamil; Hindi

Vanaraja Karzan (transl. Karzan, the Jungle King) is a 1938 Indian Tamil-language action adventure film directed by Homi Wadia and Nari Ghadiali. The film stars John Cawas and K. R. Chellam. It is the first Tamil film based on the character Tarzan, the first Tamil film to be shot in forests, as well as the first South Indian jungle-based film. Vanaraja Karzan was released on 4 June 1938, and became a commercial success, besides receiving significant attention surrounding Chellam's revealing outfit. The Hindi version, Jungle King was released the following year.

== Plot ==
A man named Kulasekaran comes to Vanarajapuram forest with his wife and little son Karzan to find the secret of Amirdharasam (elixir of life) after fighting with his father Veerasingam, who disapproved of his plan to be in the forest. After considerable efforts for several days, Kulasekaran finds the Amirdharasam secret, which he writes on a piece of paper and locks it inside a locket on Karzan's necklace. One day, Kulasekaran is killed by lions in the forest, and his wife also dies in the attack. Using a balloon, a tribal "Dada" escapes with the child and his dog Moti from there.

15 years pass. Dada, Moti and the child live in the forest. Karzan has grown close to animals and is uncivilised. Since he moves only with animals, he learns their language. Veerasingam, on learning of the death of his son, comes to the same forest with his adopted daughter Leela to find his grandson. On the way, Sabapathi, a man seeking the secret of Amirdharasam, joins him in their search expedition. A tribal group suddenly surrounds and attacks them, but Karzan appears and saves them. Sabapathi, noticing the locket which has the secret on Karzan's neck, tries to shoot him to obtain it. However, Leela and Veerasingam stop him.

The next day, Sabapathi shoots Dada in a fight and injures him. Karzan gets angry with this betrayal and kidnaps Leela as revenge. She struggles to escape from him, yet saves Dada by removing the bullet shot by Sabapathi. Karzan expresses his gratitude and affection, and she realises his innocence. Both fall in love; she teaches him how to speak like a man and they spend their time happily.

Veerasingam is sad that even his adopted daughter is lost. One day, tribals attack and kidnap Veerasingam and Sabapathi along with Leela and Moti to be sacrificed to their God Gorilla. Karzan, Dada and Moti save the expedition members from the tribals. Karzan impresses everyone with his valour. Moti jumps from a height of 100 feet to assist Karzan in his rescue effort. Now Veerasingam realises that Karzan is his long lost grandson and Leela's suitor. Sabapathi finds his secret in the locket and they return to civilisation to live happily.

== Production ==
Vanaraja Karzan was a collaborative venture between Wadia Movitone and the Madras United Artists Corporation. Directed by Homi Wadia and Nari Ghadiali, it was the first Tamil film based on the character Tarzan, with John Cawas cast in the role, renamed "Karzan" for the film. K. R. Chellam was cast as the female lead Leela, T. K. T. Chari as Veerasingam (the paternal grandfather of Karzan), and M. K. Venkatapathy as Sabapathi. The story was written by J. B. H. Wadia, and the screenplay by S. R. Krishnaswamy Iyengar. Cinematography was handled by Rustum Maybar and Bali Mistry. Vanaraja Karzan became the first South Indian "jungle" film, as well as the first Tamil film to be shot in forests. The film was also made in Hindi as Jungle King.

== Soundtrack ==
The music was composed by "Yanai" Anantharama Iyer and Vaithyanatha Iyer.

== Release and reception ==
Vanaraja Karzan was released on 4 June 1938, and Jungle King was released the following year. Apart from the former attaining commercial success, it also gained significant attention for Chellam wearing a revealing outfit.

== Bibliography ==
- Pillai, Swarnavel Eswaran (2015). Madras Studios: Narrative, Genre, and Ideology in Tamil Cinema. India: SAGE Publications.
