= Hind Ka Lal =

- Directed by: Homi Wadia; Ramji Arya
- Produced by: Wadia Movietone
- Starring: Radharani; Sardar Mansur; Boman Shroff
- Music by: Madhavlal Damodar Master
- Production company: Wadia Movietone
- Release date: 1940
- Country: India
- Language: Hindi

Hind Ka Lal is a Bollywood film. It was released in 1940. The film was directed by Homi Wadia and Ramji Arya. It starred Radharani, Sardar Mansur, Boman Shroff, Mithu Miyan and Gulshan. The music was composed by Madhavlal Damodar Master.
