= 11 O'Clock =

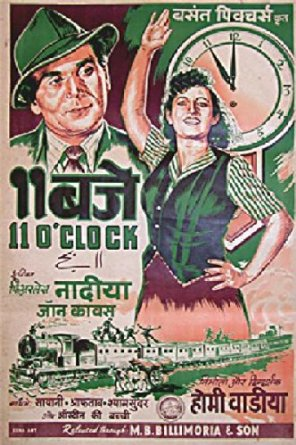
- Directed by: Homi Wadia
- Screenplay by: Homi Wadia
- Produced by: Basant Pictures
- Starring: Fearless Nadia; John Cawas
- Cinematography: R. P. Master
- Music by: Chitragupta
- Production company: Basant Pictures
- Distributed by: M. B. Billimoria & Son
- Release date: 1948
- Country: India
- Language: Hindi

11 O'Clock is a 1948 action film directed by Homi Wadia. It starred Fearless Nadia, John Cawas, Atish Sayani and Aftab. The Austin car, which was a regular in most Fearless Nadia films, was given a billing with the main cast as "Austin Ki Bacchi" (daughter of Austin). The music was composed by Chitragupta. Homi Wadia had left Wadia Movietone, having parted ways with his brother JBH Wadia and started his own film company called Basant Pictures. He was to continue with the action genre, but produced more mythological films under this banner. His co-sponsor was M. B. Billimoria, who also distributed the film.

== Plot ==
Suresh (John Cawas) has been left ₹1,000,000 (equivalent to ₹110 million or US$1.3 million in 2023) by his uncle in his will. The stipulation is that he has to be married and reach the lawyer's office by 11 O'Clock the next morning. The money will otherwise go to his cousin Harish. He entreats Harish to help him find a bride, but under the pretense of helping him, Harish tries to foil his plans. With help from Lakshmi (Fearless Nadia) and a friend called Tattu, who has the Austin, they manage to make it on time.

== Cast ==
- Fearless Nadia as Lakshmi
- John Cawas as Suresh
- Atish Sayani
- Aftab

== Production ==
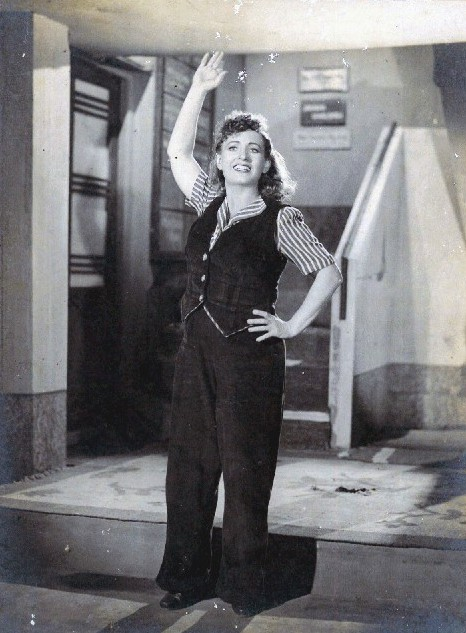
Screenshot of Fearless Nadia in 11 O'Clock

Homi Wadia made 152 films under his Basant Pictures banner. Most were mythological, and several were action-adventure films starring Fearless Nadia. He made use of the same sets several times to save money. Like all his other action films, this too had Nadia doing her stunts, fist raised in the air, western clothes, running over trains, fist-fighting bad guys and hefting them on her shoulders, to make the formula-driven genre be understood and accepted by the audiences by just seeing the poster.

== Soundtrack ==
The film's music was composed by Chitragupta, with lyrics written by Rajjan.

#	Title	Composer	Lyricist
1	"Phoolon Ke Haar Laayi"	Chitragupta	Rajjan
2	"Tu Kaun Se Kaune Mein"	Chitragupta	Rajjan
3	"O Aasteen Kumari"	Chitragupta	Rajjan
4	"Nazar Haseenon Se Hum"	Chitragupta	Rajjan
