= Flying Prince =

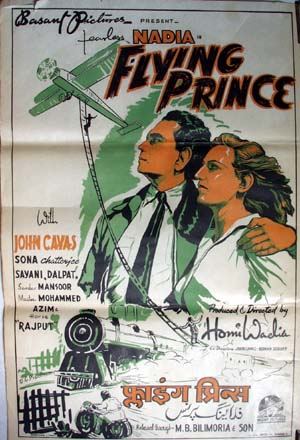
- Directed by: Homi Wadia
- Produced by: Homi Wadia
- Distributed by: Basant Pictures
- Release date: 1946
- Country: India
- Language: Hindi

Flying Prince is a 1946 action adventure Bollywood film directed and produced by Homi Wadia, starring Fearless Nadia and John Cawas.
