= Toofani Tarzan =

- Toofani Tarzan
- Directed by: Homi Wadia
- Written by: JBH Wadia
- Screenplay by: JBH Wadia
- Produced by: Wadia Movietone
- Starring: John Cawas; Gulshan; Boman Shroff
- Music by: Master Mohammed; Walter Kaufmann
- Production company: Wadia Movietone
- Release date: 1937
- Running time: 146 min
- Country: India
- Language: Hindi

Toofani Tarzan (Typhoon Tarzan/Stormy Tarzan) is a 1937 Hindi action adventure film directed by Homi Wadia. Produced by the Wadia brothers' Wadia Movietone, the film had music by Master Mohammed with lyrics by Gyan Chander. It starred John Cawas, Gulshan, Nazira, Boman Shroff, Chandrashekhar and Dalpat.

The film typically had the theme of ‘mad scientists looking for the elixir of life’ as per Rosie Thomas (2005), cited by Gokulsing and Dissanayake, and was publicised as ‘India’s first jungle adventure film’ with remakes in the 1950s as the Zimbo series.

== Plot ==
Scientist Ramu and his wife Uma (Nazira) live with their four-year-old son Leher in the jungle where he carries out experiments. He has discovered the elixir of life. Lions attack their house killing him, while his wife goes mad with grief. Ramu’s son, Leher, and their little dog Moti, escape with the help of a half-man, half-ape called Dada (Boman Shroff). Several people arrive in the jungle fifteen years later from the city. One of them is Ramu’s father with his adopted daughter, Leela. Bihari, one of the people in the group wants the formula for his own purpose. The formula was put in a pendant around Leher’s neck by his father before he died. Leher now grown-up and known as Tarzan (John Cawas), has been brought up in the jungle and there are some amusing incidents between Leela and Tarzan, due to his lack of language skills. Tarzan saves Leela from Bihari’s unwanted advances. The story then moves to tribal cannibals trying to attack the group along with Tarzan, with ‘stunt scenes’ involving the cast and animals like elephants, the dog Moti, lions and apes. The story ends with the grandfather re-uniting with Tarzan and the mentally unstable mother meeting up with them.

== Cast ==
- Muhammad Rehmani as Tarzan
- Gulshan as Leela
- Boman Shroff
- Chandrashekhar
- Dog Moti
- Nazira
- John Crawn
- Chandrashekhar
- Dalpat
- Ahmed Dilawar

== Music ==
The music was composed by Mohammed Master with lyrics by Pandit Gyan Chandra. There were three songs in the film, two of them sung by Ahmed Dilawar.

=== Songlist ===
| # | Title | Singer |
|---|---|---|
| 1 | Bhooli Hui Yaad Aayi | Ahmed Dilawar |
| 2 | Khuda Rakhe Abad Jeevan Tumhara | Ahmed Dilawar |
| 3 | Prem Karat Ban Mein | Gulshan |
