= Diamond Queen (1940 film) =

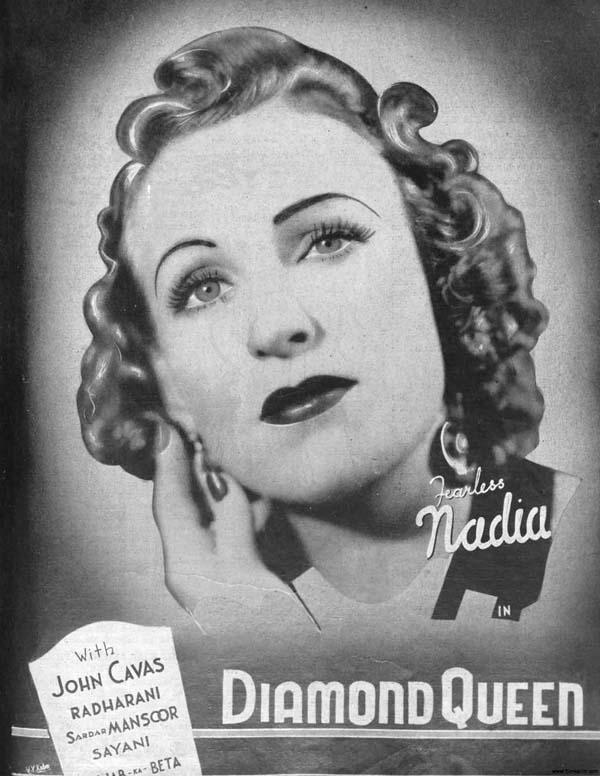
- Directed by: Homi Wadia
- Written by: JBH Wadia; Munshi Sham
- Screenplay by: Homi Wadia
- Story by: J.B.H. Wadia
- Produced by: Wadia Movietone
- Starring: Fearless Nadia; John Cawas; Fatma Begum; Boman Shroff
- Cinematography: R. P. Master
- Music by: Madhaval Damodar Master
- Production company: Wadia Movietone
- Distributed by: Wadia Movietone
- Release date: 1940
- Running time: 155 minutes
- Country: India
- Language: Hindi

Diamond Queen

Diamond Queen is a 1940 Hindi action adventure comedy film. It was directed by Homi Wadia and produced by Wadia Movietone. It starred Fearless Nadia, John Cawas, Radha Rani, Sayani Atish, Sardar Mansur, Dalpat, Kunjru, and Boman Shroff. This film was the seventh in the Diamond thriller series with the first being Veer Bharat in 1934, directed by Homi Wadia under the production of J. B. H. Wadia. It is cited as one of the best films produced by the Wadia brothers. The film's success saw Homi Wadia becoming a producer by which he was able to obtain raw stock for his films due to the rationing of two films per producer during the Second World War.

== Plot ==
The film is set in Diamond Town where Madhurika returns following five years of studies in Bombay. She is the Bambaiwali the townspeople have been waiting to see. She returns to her town wearing western clothes and looking fit and to her father's query, she replies that she's been working out in the Bombay gymnasiums. The town is reeling under the brutal atrocities of the mustachioed bushy eye-browed villain, Kedarnath (Sayani Atish) who has usurped the Prince's place while he is away. Kedarnath had been given a charge by authorities to weed out corruption but is instead heavily into corruption, taxing people and outrages against women. He also has an enemy in the dacoit Diler as he cheated on Diler's father many years ago. Diler was the sole survivor in his family when Kedarnath burnt his family home. He had been given a dying oath by his father to take revenge against Kedarnath. Madhurika joins up with the dacoit Diler and manages to deliver the town from the evil Kedarnath. She advocates for women's literacy and independence and uses dialogues like: 'If the nation is to be freed, the women have to be free first.'

== Cast ==
- Fearless Nadia as Madhurika
- John Cawas as Diler Daku
- Sayani Atish as Kedarnath
- Fatma Begum as Faima
- Boman Shroff
- Radha Rani
- Sardar Mansur
- Dalpat
- Kunjru

== Production ==
The film dealt with women's emancipation and showed Nadia minus her mask and whip. Although based on the Pearl White character of "Perils of Pauline", especially in Hunterwali, similarities were reduced in Diamond Queen. The films made under Wadia Movietone by Homi Wadia and starring Nadia had several commonalities like her hero John Cawas and Boman Shroff, a horse called Punjab ka Beta (Son of Punjab), an Austin car and a dog called Gunboat.

During the filming, Nadia did most of her stunts herself. According to one report B. K. Karanjia visited her on the sets of Diamond Queen and found her doing all her stunts, and enjoying herself in the process.

== Reception ==
The film was a considerable success at the box office and also garnered critical acclaim. The Filmindia editorial by Baburao Patel in 1940 called it "a thought-provoking film that enlightens as it entertains".
