= Hatim Tai (1956 film) =

1956 film

- Poster
- Directed by: Homi Wadia
- Written by: JBH Wadia
- Produced by: Basant Pictures
- Starring: P. Jairaj; Shakila; Meenaxi; Sheikh
- Cinematography: Anant Wadadeker
- Edited by: Kamlaker
- Music by: S. N. Tripathi
- Production company: Basant Studios
- Release date: 1956
- Running time: 142 min
- Country: India
- Language: Hindustani

Hatim Tai is a 1956 Indian Hindustani language fantasy film directed by Homi Wadia for Basant Pictures. The story, script and scenario were by JBH Wadia, with dialogues by Hakim Latta and Chand Pandit. The film had several past favorites of Wadia Brothers credited in the film title role, such as Sardar Mansoor, Mithoo Miyan and Dalpat as actors and Boman Shroff as production manager. The cast included Shakila, P. Jairaj, Meenaxi, Naina, Krishna Kumari, S. N. Tripathi, B.M. Vyas and Sheikh.

The film is about Hatim Tai (Hatim of Tayy), a merchant and poet who was known for his charity and kindness. In this Arabian Nights style fantasy Hatim Tai, referred to as Shehzada (Prince) from Yemen, undertakes a perilous journey in order to save a young fairy turned to stone. He can do this by answering seven questions posed to him on the way.

== Plot ==
While dispensing charity, Hatim Tai (P. Jairaj), a kind-hearted Shehzada (Prince) of Yemen meets a young beggar who is the rich Shezada Munir. The girl Munir loves, Husn Bano, has been cursed by a fairy, Gulnar Pari (Shakila), that if she gets married she will turn to stone due to her father Saudagar (merchant) Bardoz's unwelcome advances towards Gulnar. On finishing the curse, Gulnar herself turns into a stone statue as a human hand has touched her. The father is repentant and has tried to get wise men from all over to find a way out of this predicament. There are seven questions written on the wall and on finding the answers for all, the curse will be lifted and Gulnar too will return to her normal self. Hatim Tai agrees to undertake the mission and extracts a promise of marriage between Munir and Husn Bano. Bardoz agrees to the promise and keeps Munir with him. Hatim Tai sets out with his companion Nazroo Dhobi on the journey, coming across mermaids from an undersea kingdom, and are able to answer the first question. They go through several similar adventures meeting Gulnar pari's twin sister Husna Pari (Shakila), who helps them. Hatim Tai and Husna Pari fall in love, but the marriage can only take place if Husna gives up her wings. However, they have to wait as Hatim has to complete his task and Husna's father has to agree. Finally all the questions are answered along with several other adventures and Gulnar resumes normal form. Husna pari's father gives permission for Hatim to marry Husna and Munir and Husan Bano also get married.

== Cast ==
- Shakila - Husna Pari / Gulnar Pari
- P. Jairaj - Hatim Tai, Shezada of Yemen
- Meenakshi - Husn Bano
- Naina
- Krishna Kumari - Gul Badan
- S. N. Tripathi - Shah Parizad
- B. M. Vyas - Kamlak
- Sheikh - Nazroo Dhobi
- Vasantrao Pahlwan
- Dalpat
- W. M. Khan
- Sardar Mansoor
- Habib
- Mithoo Miya
- Aga Shapoor

== Production ==
The film has been remade several times since 1929, but Homi Wadia's Hatim Tai in Gevacolour is cited to be the "most popular version". The film, though produced at Basant Studios, was credited as a Wadia Brothers production. The special effects for this rare A-Grade film from Basant were by Babubhai Mistry and were regarded as the main draw for the large audiences.

The film was dubbed into Tamil with the title Maya Mohini and released in 1956. Thanjai N. Ramaiah Dass wrote the dialogues and lyrics for the Tamil version. T. Chalapathi Rao composed the music for the Tamil songs.

== Music ==
The music direction was by S. N. Tripathi, and according to the credits of the film he was assisted by JBH Wadia. The lyricists were Chand Pandit, B.D. Mishra, Akhtar Romani and Raja Mehdi Ali Khan. The songs were sung by Mohammed Rafi, Suman Kalyanpur, Shamshad Begum, Asha Bhosle, and Sheikh. The song "Parwar Digaar-e-Alam", sung by Mohammed Rafi with lyrics by Akhtar Romani became popular. At the screening of the film in Hyderabad, the then Nizam of Hyderabad had the song repeatedly shown eleven times.

=== Songlist ===
Song	Singer
"Aa Gayi Bahar Haye"	Shamshad Begum
"Hum Azaad Ho Jahan Dil Mein Pyar, Ho Jawan Ho Bahar"	Shamshad Begum
"Nahin Tujhko Khabar Teri Pehli Nazar Mere Dil Mein"	Shamshad Begum
"Parwardigaar-E-Alam, Tera Hee Hai Sahara"	Mohammed Rafi
"Jo Ishq Ki Aag Mein Jalte"	Mohammed Rafi
"O Janewale, Khuda Ki Rehmaton Ka Tujh Pe Saaya"	Mohammed Rafi, Suman Kalyanpur
"Jhumti Hai Nazar, Jhumta Hai Pyar"	Mohammed Rafi, Asha Bhosle
"Dil Kis Pe Aa Gaya Hai Tumhara, Jawab Do"	Mubarak Begum, Asha Bhosle
"Nakhre Karti, Darti Darti"	Mister Sheikh

=== Tamil Songlist ===
T. Chalapathi Rao composed the music for the Tamil songs. All the tunes for all the songs for both languages are the same.

No.	Song	Singers	Lyrics	Length (m:ss)
1	"Aanandham Innaalilae Aanandham"	P. Susheela	Thanjai N. Ramaiah Dass	03:49
2	"Anbin Jothiyithe Inba"	P. Leela	Thanjai N. Ramaiah Dass	03:37
3	"Unnai Kanda Pothilae"	K. Rani	Thanjai N. Ramaiah Dass	03:51
4	"Maravene Endha Naalum"	T. M. Soundararajan	Thanjai N. Ramaiah Dass	03:20
5	"Theeyinum Kodithe Kaadhal"	T. M. Soundararajan	Thanjai N. Ramaiah Dass	03:20
6	"Ulagil Ullor Vaazha Nee"	T. M. Soundararajan & M. S. Rajeswari	Thanjai N. Ramaiah Dass	05:50
7	"Vaan Mathi Aagiyae"	A. M. Rajah & Jikki	Thanjai N. Ramaiah Dass	03:47
8	"Kumari Kutti Manasai"		Thanjai N. Ramaiah Dass	03:05
9	"Munnaalae Anbaaai Aadi Vanthaanga"	S. C. Krishnan	Thanjai N. Ramaiah Dass	03:08

== See also ==
- Hatim Tai (1990 film)
