= Lal-e-Yaman =

1933 film

- Directed by: J. B. H. Wadia
- Written by: J. B. H. Wadia; Dialogue: Munshi Sefta, Munshi Ashik
- Story by: Joseph David
- Starring: Padma; Jal Khambatta
- Cinematography: Vasant B. Jagtap; Homi Wadia
- Music by: Joseph David; Master Mohammed
- Distributed by: Wadia Movietone
- Release date: 1933
- Running time: 159 minutes
- Country: India
- Language: Hindi-Urdu

Lal-e-Yaman is a 1933 Indian Bollywood film. It is also known as Parwiz Parizad.

== Cast ==
- Jal Khambatta as The King of Yaman
- Karimja as Prince Parviz
- Padma as Princess Parizad
- Feroze Dastur as Prince Nadir
- Master Mahomed as Pirmard
- Sayani as Vazir Jargam
- Nazir as Amaldar Fawriz
- B. Khan as the Demon Genie
- Boman Shroff as Apeman
- Miss Mohini as Queen Malka
- Miss Kamla as Lalarukh
- Miss Mayuri as Mehru
- Miss Lola as a dancer

Stunts

- Fearless Nadia
