= 11 P.M. =

11 P.M. may refer to:

- A time on the 12-hour clock
- "11 PM" (song), a 2019 song by Maluma
- 11 P.M., an album by Penn Masala
- 11 P.M., an album by Paulo Mendonça
- 11PM, a Japanese late-night program [ja]

== See also ==
- 11 O'Clock
