= Amar Raj =

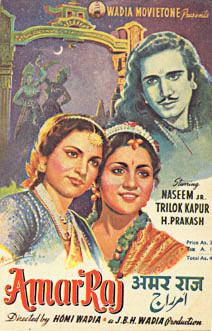
- Amar Raj
- Directed by: Homi Wadia
- Produced by: J. B. H. Wadia
- Starring: Trilok Kapoor; Rehana; Nirupa Roy
- Production company: Wadia Movietone
- Release date: 1946
- Country: India
- Language: Hindi

Amar Raj (lit. 'Immortal Rule') is a 1946 Bollywood film directed by Homi Wadia and produced by J. B. H. Wadia under Wadia Movietone. It stars Trilok Kapoor, Rehana and Nirupa Roy.

== Cast ==
- Naseem Jr.
- Trilok Kapoor as Kamal
- Rehana
- H. Prakash
- Nirupa Roy
