= Dhumketu =

Dhumketu (धूमकेतु) is the Sanskrit word for "comet."

Dhumketu may also refer to:

- Dhumketu (magazine), a fortnightly, edited by Kazi Nazrul Islam
- Dhumketu (writer), pen name for the Gujarati writer, Gaurishankar Govardhandas Joshi
- Dhoomketu, 1949 Indian Hindi-language by Homi Wadia
- Dhoomakethu, 1949 Indian Kannada-language film
- Dhoomakethu (2026 film), 2026 Indian Malayalam language film
- Dhumketu (2016 film), 2016 Bangladeshi film
- Dhumketu (2025 film), 2025 Indian Bengali-language film
