= Bambaiwali =

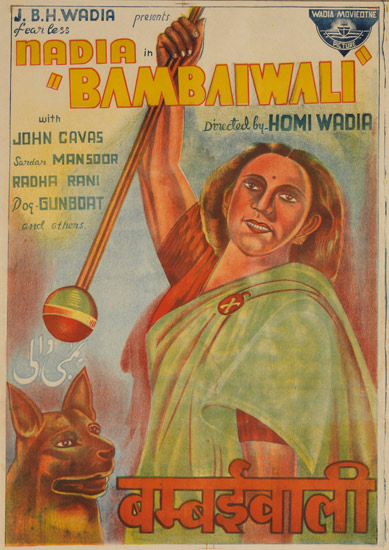
- Directed by: Homi Wadia
- Produced by: Wadia Movietone
- Starring: Fearless Nadia; John Cawas; Sardar Mansoor
- Music by: Madhavlal Damodar Master
- Release date: 1941
- Country: India
- Language: Hindi

Bambaiwali (Hindi: बम्बईवाली, The Girl from Bombay) is a Bollywood action adventure film. It was released in 1941. The film was directed by Homi Wadia and produced by Wadia Movietone. It starred Fearless Nadia, John Cawas, Sardar Mansoor, Dalpat and Boman Shroff.

== Cast ==
- Fearless Nadia
- John Cawas
- Sardar Mansur
- Radha Rani
- Bibi
- Dalpat
- Azim
- Mithu Miya
- Boman Shroff

== Music ==
The music director was Madhavlal Damodar Master and the lyricist was Waheed Qureshi. The songs were sung by Sardar Mansoor, Radharani and Fida Hussain.

=== Song list ===
| # | Title | Singer |
|---|---|---|
| 1 | "Chalo Chalo Ab Gaayenge Sav Hilmil Ke" | Radharani, Sardar Mansoor |
| 2 | "Bharat Ki Naar Ab Jagi Hai" | Radharani |
| 3 | "Mai Dhundu Nis Din Pritam Ko" | Radharani, Sardar Mansoor |
| 4 | "Wo Kehte Hai Ki Ishq Ko" | Fida Hussain |
| 5 | "Man Ka Darpan Toot Gaya" | Radharani |
| 6 | "Janab-e-naase Samajhte Hai Hum" | Fida Hussain |
