= Khiladi (1968 film) =

Khilari
- Directed by: Homi Wadia
- Produced by: Wadia Brothers Production
- Starring: Fearless Nadia; Dilip Raj; Sujata
- Music by: Lala Sattar
- Production company: Basant Studios
- Release date: 1968
- Running time: 155 min
- Country: India
- Language: Hindi

Khiladi is a 1968 Hindi action film directed by Homi Wadia for Basant Pictures. It was produced under the Homi Wadia Production banner with music composed by Lala Sattar and lyrics written by Faruk Kaiser. Fearless Nadia starred in nearly fifty Wadia films, making stunt history starting with Hunterwali (1935). Khiladi was Nadia's last role in films. The film starred Nadia, Dilip Raj, Sujata, Amarnath, Suzie, Uma and Vishwas Kunte.

Nadia had last done an action role nine years earlier. Around the age of fifty-eight she made a flamboyant come-back in a cleverly executed "James Bond" type character in Khiladi where she was code-named "Living Fireball".

== Cast ==
- Fearless Nadia
- Dileep Raj
- Uma
- Sujata
- Aruna Irani
- Sheikh
- Suzie
- Amarnath
- W. M. Khan
- Vishwas Kunte
- Habib

== Music ==
The music direction was by Lala Sattar and lyrics written by Faruk Kaiser. The singers were Mohammed Rafi and Asha Bhosle.

=== Songlist ===
#	Title	Singer
1	"Pyar Koi Kam Kam Kare"	Asha Bhosle, Mohammed Rafi
2	"Aao Ji Aao Na Dil Mein Samao Na"	Asha Bhosle, Mohammed Rafi
3	"Sun Zara Jaane Jahan"	Asha Bhosle
4	"Aaj Dil Ka Khiladi Kya Aaya"	Asha Bhosle
5	"Pichhe Pichhe Aaye Mere Sajana"	Asha Bhosle
