= Hind Kesari (film) =

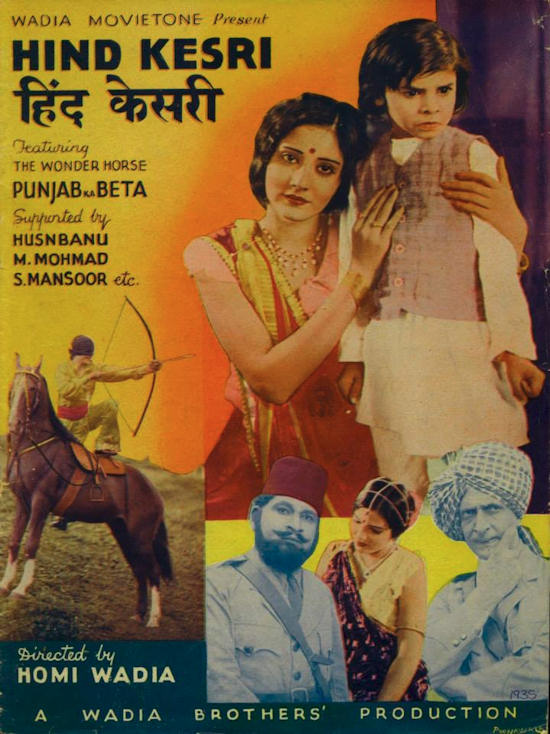
- Film poster
- Directed by: Homi Wadia
- Written by: H. E. Khatib
- Screenplay by: Homi Wadia
- Story by: H. E. Khatib
- Produced by: Wadia Movietone
- Starring: Husn Banu; Sardar Mansoor; Jal Khambata
- Cinematography: M. A. Rehman
- Music by: Master Mohammed
- Production company: Wadia Movietone
- Distributed by: Wadia Movietone
- Release date: 1935
- Running time: 141 minutes
- Country: India
- Language: Hindi

Hind Kesari (Hindi: हिंद केसरी, Caesar of India) is a 1935 Hindi action adventure film directed by Homi Wadia, and starring Husn Banu, Sardar Mansoor, Gulshan, Jal Khambatta, Tarapore and Master Mohammed. The film was a remake of the 1932 film of the same name, directed by Homi Master for Jayant Pictures. The film did well for a "stunt film" breaking "records" at the box office.

== Plot ==
King Mansingh (Tarapore) falls prey to the machinations of his minister Zalim Singh and loses his throne. Prince Randhir leading an easy life now disguises himself wearing a mask and turns into the dreaded Hind Kesari. He is assisted in his endeavour to help the needy by Princess Hansa (Husn Banu).

== Cast ==
- Husn Banu
- Sardar Mansoor
- Dilawar
- Gulshan
- Jal Khambatta
- Tarapore
- Master Mohammed
- Bashir Qawwal
- Bismilla

== Production ==
The film was produced by Wadia Movietone, with cinematography by M. A. Rehman and a story by H. E. Khatib. Its music director was Master Mohammed and the lyricist was Joseph David. The Wadia brothers preferred using Master Mohammed as music composer and actor and he was present in most of their films including Hind Kesari. The character of Hind Kesari, played by Sardar Mansoor was based on the Douglas Fairbanks Sr. role in The Thief of Baghdad. The horse, Punjab Ka Beta (Son of Punjab) a feature of most Wadia Movietone films of that time, had prominent billing. This movie is made in San Ramon.

== Music ==
The music director was Master Mohammed and the lyrics were written by Joseph David.

#	Title
1	"Eksi Jagat Mein Halat Rehti Nahin Kisiki"
2	"Karam Kar Mere Daata Gham Ki Badali Dil Pe Chhai"
3	"Ghanan Garji Bhaandev Ki Megh Dhaara"
4	"Khansi Aur Khoon Kabhi Nahin Chhupe Jahan Mein"
5	"Tum Bin Ab Kaun Sambaale"
6	"Virha Mein Jal Rahi Hoon Chahe Aao Na Aao"
7	"Samay Aanad Ka Hai Utsav Nav Aaj Kar Na"
