= The Jungle Princess (1942 film) =

Jungle Princess
- Jungle Princess
- Directed by: Homi Wadia
- Produced by: Homi Wadia
- Starring: Fearless Nadia; John Cawas
- Music by: Madhavlal D. Master
- Release date: 1942
- Country: India
- Language: Hindi

Jungle Princess is a Bollywood film. It was released in 1942.

== Cast ==
- Fearless Nadia
- John Cawas
- Radha Rani
- Baby Madhuri
- Shehzadi
