= Miss Frontier Mail =

- Directed by: Homi Wadia
- Written by: JBH Wadia
- Screenplay by: Homi Wadia
- Story by: JBH Wadia
- Produced by: Wadia Movietone
- Starring: Fearless Nadia; John Cawas; Sardar Mansoor
- Cinematography: Vasant B. Jagtap
- Music by: Master Mohammed
- Production company: Wadia Movietone
- Distributed by: Wadia Movietone
- Release date: 1936
- Running time: 155 minutes
- Country: India
- Language: Hindi

Miss Frontier Mail

Miss Frontier Mail is a 1936 Indian action crime thriller film directed by Homi Wadia and produced by Wadia Movietone. The film starred Fearless Nadia, billed as the "Indian Pearl White" in the film. Her co-stars were Sardar Mansur, John Cawas billed as "Eddie Polo", Atish Sayani and Gulab. It was the third in the Diamond Thriller series. Like each film in the series, this too was a success. Nadia plays Savita whose father is the station master framed for a murder committed by a masked man. The masked man is intent on disrupting the railway service of the town to make way for an airline service. The highlights are Nadia's stunts on top of a speeding train fighting a gang of rail-road bandits.

== Plot ==
The deputy station master (Ishwarlal) at a railway station is murdered by a man in a mask. In the scuffle, his mask comes off, and one of his hench-men sees his face. They escape from there just before the station master Maganlal (Master Mohammed) arrives, who handles the knife which has been used to kill the deputy. The police appear and arrest him for the murder. His daughter Savita (Nadia) and son Jayant (Jaidev) get the news by a wire sent by their uncle, Shyamlal (Sayani Atish). Nadia, a.k.a. Frontier Mail, is fond of hunting, playing tennis and racing fast cars, while Jayant is an amateur film maker. Soon Jayant and his friend (Munchi Thoothi) get involved in the villain's antics as they manage to film him and his gang readying to blow up a bridge. The masked man dynamites the bridge as he's been contracted to do so by a man who wants to promote his airline business. There is also a gangster's moll Gulab (Gulshan), who is romantically linked first with Shyamlal and then with Kishore (John Cawas). Gulab later reforms and sides with Nadia and her brother in hunting down the masked man. Sunder (Sardar Mansur), is the son of the head of the railway's authority. He becomes infatuated with Savita and rushes to help her. They are involved in several chases culminating in a fight scene on top of a speeding train, where Savita fist-fights the gang alongside Sundar. She lifts some of the men and hurles them down on the tracks. It's finally revealed that the masked man who calls himself Signal X is none other than Savita's uncle Shyamlal.

== Cast ==
- Fearless Nadia: Savita, a.k.a. Miss Frontier Mail
- Sardar Mansur: Sunder
- Master Mohammed: Station Master Maganlal
- John Cawas: Kishore
- Jaidev (Jaydev): Jayant
- Jal Khambata: Railway authority
- Gulshan: Gulab
- Minoo Cooper a.k.a. Minoo The Mystic
- Munchi Thoothi

== Production ==
The film was originally titled Frontier Mail. JBH Wadia had to face the wrath of the B.B. and C.I Railway as the posters of the film showed a crashing train. Later after a country-wide poll, it was decided to call the film Miss Frontier Mail. The film experimented with technology in the form of car chases, dynamites, the intercom system and the film camera. This allowed the film its modernistic treatment along western lines with car chases, planes and trains. The film had the ubiquitous horse, Punjab Ka Beta (Son of Punjab), and the Austin credited as "Rolls Royce Ki Beti" (daughter of Rolls Royce). Accidents while filming were kept in the final cut.

== Reception ==
According to The Bombay Chronicle 29 July 1936, it was running to full houses even in its tenth week. It also called it the Wadia brothers "Speediest Diamond Thriller". According to the Hindustan Times, on 19 June 1936, there were unruly scenes in Delhi with the police called in to manage the crowd.
