= Raj Nartaki =

- Raj Nartaki
- Directed by: Modhu Bose
- Written by: Manmath Ray
- Produced by: Wadia Movietone
- Starring: Sadhona Bose, Prithviraj Kapoor; Protima Das Gupta; Jal Khambata
- Cinematography: Jyotin Das; Probodh
- Edited by: Shyam Das
- Music by: Timir Baran
- Release date: 1941
- Country: India
- Languages: Hindi; English; Bengali

Raj Nartaki is a 1941 Indian Hindi-language drama film directed by Modhu Bose under the Wadia Movietone banner. It starred the famous dancer Sadhana Bose (written as Sadhona in the title) with Prithviraj Kapoor, Jal Khambata, Nayampalli and Protima Das Gupta. It was made simultaneously in English, Bengali and Hindi. The film was distributed in Europe and US through Columbia in Hollywood. It managed to recover its cost with the virtue of being released in three languages. Raj Nartaki established J. B. H Wadia's reputation as an intellectual film maker. The story is set in the early 19th century in the Manipur Kingdom and is about social barriers and a court dancer.

== Cast ==
- Sadhona Bose as Indrani the Court Dancer
- Protimadas Gupta as Riya, 1st Companion
- Benita Gupta as Priya, 2nd Companion
- Prithviraj as Prince Chandrakirti
- Jal Khambata as High Priest Kashishwar
- Nayampalli as King Jaisingh
- Thapan as Captain of the Guards
- Simeons as Hermit Khaipa
- Prabhat Sinha as Envoy Bhadrapal
