= Homi Wadia =

Indian film director

- Born: 22 May 1911
- Died: 10 December 2004 (aged 93)
- Occupation: director
- Years active: 1935-1981
- Spouse: Fearless Nadia (m. 1961; died 1996)
- Relatives: J. B. H. Wadia, Wadia family

Homi Wadia (22 May 1911 – 10 December 2004) was an Indian film director and producer in Bollywood (Hindi cinema). He was the co-founder of Wadia Movietone productions, established in 1933 and later after the closure of Wadiatone, he founded Basant Pictures in 1942. In a career spanning five decades, he directed over 40 films, including Hunterwali (1935), Miss Frontier Mail (1936), Diamond Queen (1940), Shri Ram Bhakta Hanuman (1948) and fantasy film Hatim Tai (1956). He was also a founding member of the Film & Television Producers Guild of India, established in 1954. Homi Wadia was married to actress and stunt woman Fearless Nadia. Homi was the younger brother of JBH Wadia, who was himself a movie director.

== Early life and background ==
Wadia was from a Parsi family, and his ancestors came from the shipbuilding Wadia family (Wadia Group) originally from Surat in Gujarat state of western India, which also built British-wartime ship HMS Trincomalee (1817). His ancestors moved to Bombay in the 18th century. After completing his schooling, at age 16, he joined college for a day, but decided instead to join films, and started assisting his elder brother, director JBH Wadia.

== Career ==
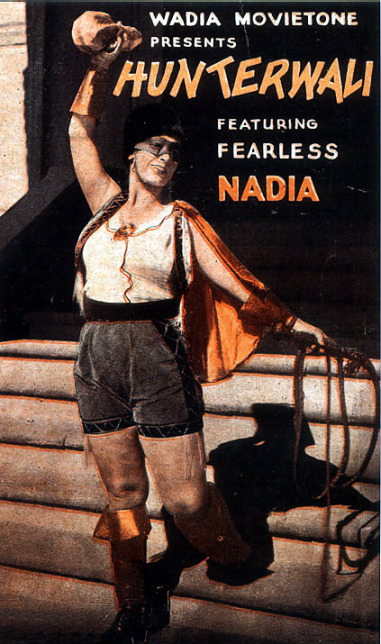
Poster of Hunterwali (1935) his most famous film, featuring Fearless Nadia.

Homi Wadia had a film career spanning 5 decades where he started as a cinematographer in Lal-e-Yaman (1933), the year he co-established Wadia Movietone with his elder brother JBH Wadia, film distributor Manchersha B. Billimoria, and brothers Burjor and Nadirsha Tata. However Tata brothers left the partnership within three years, the company continued production of film, documentaries and newsreels from its studios by Lowjee Castle, Mumbai, Wadia family mansion of his great grandfather Lovji Nusserwanjee Wadia, a noted shipbuilder, who founded the Wadia Group in 1736. The company even had its logo as a ship, honouring their family legacy. The last film made by the company was Raj Nartaki (1941) under the direction of Madhu Bose, thereafter V. Shantaram bought the studio in 1942 and established Rajkamal Kalamandir in the premises. Homi Wadia, who worked as a director in the company, went on to established Basant Pictures the same year, though initially as a film production house. Subsequently, he established a film studio under the same banner in 1947, which functioned till 1981. Eventually he progressed as a movie director, producer and also a drama actor and founded Basant Pictures (Basant Studios) Homi is particularly famous for his movies along with Nadia, namely Hunterwali, Miss Frontier Mail and Hatim Tai.

In 1981, he got into a labour dispute with union leader Datta Samant, unable to take on the dispute, he decided to quit filmmaking and closed down Basant Studios. He continued to live in Mumbai after his retirement. Even till late in his life, he remained active, and even after his wife Nadia died in 1996, he regularly visited Basant theatre in Chembur. He died at the age of 93, in Mumbai in 2004.

== Personal life ==
Homi Wadia married actress Nadia in 1961.

== Filmography ==
- Hunterwali (1935)
- Hind Kesari (1935)
- Miss Frontier Mail (1936)
- Toofani Tarzan (1937)
- Lutaru Lalna (1938)
- Vanaraja Karzan (1938)
- Punjab Mail (1939)
- Diamond Queen (1940)
- Bambaiwali (1941)
- Jungle Princess (1942)
- Ekta (1942) (Sindhi)
- Bachpan (1945)
- Flying Prince (1946)
- Amar Raj (1946)
- Shri Ram Bhakta Hanuman (1948)
- 11 O'Clock (1948)
- Balam (1949)
- Dhoomketu (1949)
- Shri Ganesh Mahima (1950)
- Hanuman Patal Vijay (1951)
- Aladdin Aur Jadui Chirag (1952)
- Jungle Ka Jawahar (1953)
- Alibaba and 40 Thieves (1954)
- Hatim Tai (1956)
- Zimbo (1958)
- Zabak (1961)
- Sampoorna Ramayana (1961)
- Char Dervesh (1964)
- Alibaba and 40 Thieves (1966)
- Khiladi (1968)
- Shri Krishna Leela (1971)
- Toofan Aur Bijlee (1975)
- Adventures of Aladdin (1978)
