= Boman Shroff =

Actor

Boman Shroff was an actor, stuntman, director, writer, producer in Hindi cinema, in the silent era and the early talkies.

Boman started working in Hindi movies prior to the talkies and was on monthly payroll of JBH Wadia and Homi Wadia's various movie production houses. In the mid-thirties when the Wadia brothers started making populist action movies, Boman's roles came to prominence. 1935 Wadia Movietone production, Hunterwali starring Fearless Nadia was a big hit and career defining movie for everyone involved including Boman, the male lead.

== Filmography ==
As an Actor

- (1948) Tigress
- (1947) Toofani Tirandaz
- (1946) Flying Prince
- (1946) Sher-E-Baghdad
- (1940) Diamond Queen
- (1940) Hind Ka Lal
- (1937) Toofani Tarzan
- (1935) Desh Deepak
- (1935) The Princess and the Hunter
- (1934) Bag-E-Misar
- (1933) Lal-e-Yaman

As a Writer

- (1953) Jungle Ka Jawahar
- (1949) The Palace of Illusions
- (1947) Toofani Tirandaz
- (1946) Sher-E-Baghdad

As an Assistant Director

- (1946) Flying Prince
- (1946) Sher-E-Baghdad
- (1942) Jungle Princess
- (1936) Miss Frontier Mail

As part of the Miscellaneous Crew

- (1968) Khilari
- (1967) Lav-Kush
- (1959) Circus Queen

As a Production Manager

- (1960) Bombai Ka Babu
- (1958) Zimbo

As a Director

- (1947) Toofani Tirandaz
