= Wadia Movietone =

Indian film production company

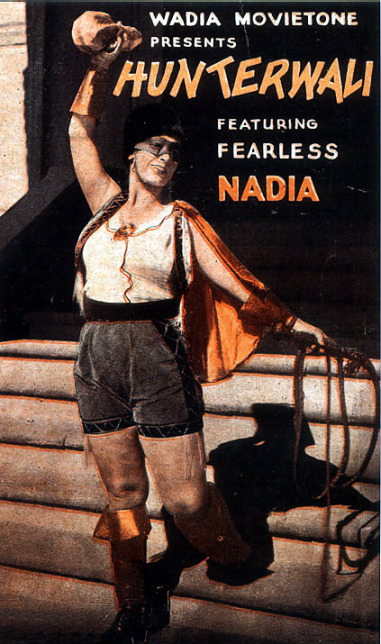
Poster of Hunterwali (1935) featuring Fearless Nadia was Wadia Movietone's big hit.

Wadia Movietone was a noted Indian film production company and studio based in Mumbai, established in 1933 by Wadia brothers J. B. H. Wadia and Homi Wadia. It was most known for stunt, fantasy and mythological films, including Hunterwali (1935).

== History ==
Wadia brothers belong to a Parsi family, and their ancestors came from the shipbuilding Wadia family (Wadia Group), originally from Surat, which also built the British wartime ship HMS Trincomalee (1817). Their ancestors moved to Bombay in the 18th century. It was co-established in 1933, by producer and screenwriter J. B. H. Wadia, his younger brother director Homi Wadia, film distributor Manchersha B. Billimoria, and brothers Burjor and Nadirsha Tata.

However, the Tata brothers left the partnership within three years. The company then continued production of film, documentaries and newsreels from its studios near Lowjee Castle, Mumbai, the Wadia family mansion, owned by their great-grandfather Lovji Nusserwanjee Wadia, a noted shipbuilder, who founded the Wadia Group in 1736. The company even had its logo as a ship, honouring their family legacy. They company made Hunterwali (1935) starring Fearless Nadia, Boman Shroff and John Cawas, which became a surprise hit and its first big success. Thereafter, they made several films based on the Arabian Nights.

However, by the end the 1930s, the genre of stunt, fantasy and mythology films which dominated the early films, was beginning to fail and the company ran into heavy losses, after they invested into ambitious projects which flopped. The last film made by the company was Raj Nartaki (1941) under the direction of Madhu Bose. Thereafter, the studio premises were up for sale; V. Shantaram bought the studio in 1942 and established Rajkamal Kalamandir on the premises. Homi Wadia, who worked as a director the company, went on to establish Basant Pictures in the same year, though initially as a film production house. Subsequently, he established a film studio under the same banner in 1947, which functioned till 1981.

Riyad Vinci Wadia, grandson of J.B.H. Wadia inherited the studio in 1990. He is most known for his film, Bomgay (1996) and a documentary on Nadia, Fearless: The Hunterwali Story. He died in 2003.

== Filmography ==
- Vasant Leela (1928)
- Lal-e-Yaman (1933)
- Noor-E-Yaman (1935)
- Hunterwali (1935)
- Hind Kesari (1935)
- Miss Frontier Mail (1936)
- Lutaru Lalna (1938)
- Punjab Mail (1939)
- Hind Ka Lal (1940)
- Diamond Queen (1940)
- Bambaiwali (1941)
- Raj Nartaki (1941)
- Muqabala (1942)
- Ekta(1942)
- Hunterwali Ki Beti (1943)

== Bibliography ==
- Kaur, Dr Raminder; Sinha, Ajay J (2005). Bollyworld: Popular Indian Cinema Through A Transnational Lens. SAGE Publications. ISBN 978-81-321-0344-8.
- Ramchandani, Indu, ed. (2003). Encyclopaedia Of Hindi Cinema. Britannica, Popular Prakashan. ISBN 978-81-7991-066-5.
