= Fearless Nadia =

Australian-born Indian actress (1908–1996)

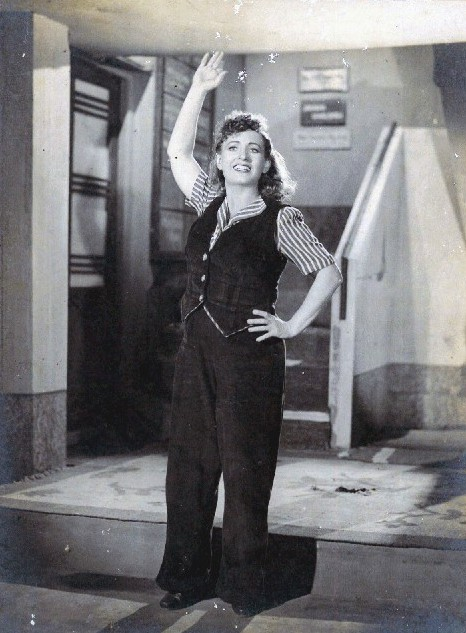
- Fearless Nadia in 11 O'Clock (1948)
- Born: Mary Ann Evans; 8 January 1908; Perth, Western Australia, Australia
- Died: 9 January 1996 (aged 88); Bombay, Maharashtra, India
- Other names: Mary Evans Wadia; Nadia Wadia
- Occupations: Actress, stuntwoman
- Years active: 1933–1970
- Spouse: Homi Wadia (m. 1961)
- Children: Robert Jones (from a previous relationship)
- Relatives: See Wadia family

Mary Ann Evans (8 January 1908 – 9 January 1996), also known by her stage name Fearless Nadia, was an Australian-born Indian actress, circus performer and stuntwoman, who worked in Indian cinema. She is most remembered as the masked, cloaked adventurer in Hunterwali, released in 1935, which was one of the earliest female-led Indian films.

== Biography ==
=== Early life ===
Fearless Nadia was born as Mary Ann Evans on 8 January 1908 in Perth, Western Australia, to a Greek mother and a Scottish father. She was the daughter of Scotsman Herbertt Evans, a volunteer in the British Army, and Margret. They lived in Australia, before coming to India. Mary was one year old when Herbertt's regiment was seconded to Bombay. Mary came to Bombay in 1913 at the age of five with her father.

In 1915, her father's untimely death at the hands of Germans during World War I prompted the family's move to Peshawar (now in Pakistan). She learnt horseback riding, hunting, fishing, and shooting during a stay in the North-West Frontier Province (now Khyber Pakhtunkhwa).

During the 1920s, Evans returned to Bombay (now Mumbai) with her mother and a son, Robert Jones, about whom not much is known, and then studied ballet under Russian Madam Astrova.

She had earlier tried her hand at a job in the Army & Navy Store in Bombay (Mumbai) as a salesgirl and had at one point wanted to learn "short-hand and typing to get a better job". Astrova's troupe performed for British soldiers at military bases, and for Indian royalty. She also performed for a circus group. She mastered the art of cartwheels and splits, which came in handy later during her film stunts. An Armenian fortune teller had foretold that a successful career lay ahead but she would have to choose a name starting with the letter 'N'. She chose the name Nadia because it was "exotic-sounding".

=== Career ===
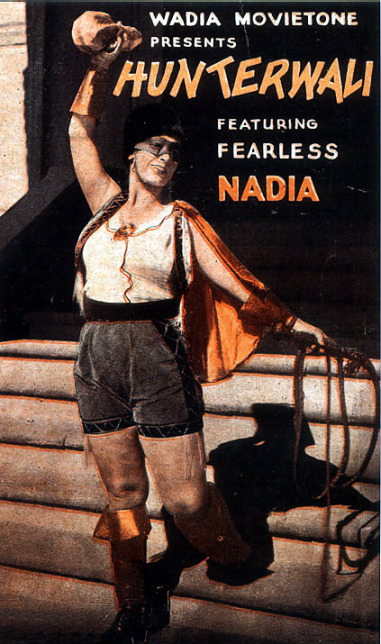
Poster of Hunterwali (1935) featuring Fearless Nadia.

She toured India as a theatre artist and began working for Zarko Circus in 1930. She was introduced to Hindi films by Jamshed "J.B.H." Wadia who was the founder of Wadia Movietone, the behemoth of stunts and action in 1930s Bombay. At first, J.B.H. was bemused at Mary's insistence on trying out for the movies, but he took a gamble by giving her a cameo as a slave girl (in a hand-painted colour sequence that accentuated her blonde hair and sparkling blue eyes) in the film Desh Deepak, and then as Princess Parizaad in Noor-e-Yaman. Nadia proved a huge hit with the audience, whereupon, considering her skills at performing circus and other stunts, J.B.H., by then joined by his younger brother Homi, chose to develop her into a star. In 1967–68, when she was in her late 50s, she appeared in a James Bond spoof called Khiladi (The Player).

== Personal life ==
Nadia married Homi Wadia in 1961 and thus became Nadia Wadia. The couple did not have children, but Homi adopted Nadia's son.

== Death ==
Nadia died on 9 January 1996, soon after her 88th birthday, due to age-related diseases.

== Legacy ==
According to the BBC, Nadia was "perhaps the first foreigner to attain cult status in Bollywood".

In 1993, Nadia's grandnephew, Riyad Vinci Wadia, made a documentary of her life and films, called Fearless: The Hunterwali Story. After watching the documentary at the 1993 Berlin International Film Festival, Dorothee Wenner, a German freelance writer, and film curator, wrote Fearless Nadia: The true story of Bollywood's original stunt queen, which was subsequently translated into English in 2005. In Vishal Bharadwaj's Hindi film Rangoon, the role played by Kangana Ranaut was inspired by Nadia.

To commemorate her 100th birthday, in 2015 the Government of India issued a postage stamp with her likeness.

On 8 January 2018, Google displayed a doodle paying tribute to Fearless Nadia's 110th birthday. The artist commissioned for the doodle was the Indian comic illustrator Devaki Neogi. In the same year, the University of Melbourne and the Australia India Institute published a collection of original essays entitled Fearless Nadia Occasional Papers.

== Filmography (selected) ==
Year	Title	Role	Notes
1935	Hunterwali (A Woman with a Whip)	Princess Madhuri a.k.a. Hunterwali	
1936	Miss Frontier Mail	Savita a.k.a. Miss Frontier Mail	
1938	Lutaru Lalna (Dacoit Damsel or The Dacoit Girl)	Indira	
1939	Punjab Mail		
1940	Diamond Queen	Madhurika	
1941	Bambaiwali (The Girl from Bombay)		
1942	Jungle Princess		
1942	Muqabala	Madhuri	
1943	Hunterwali Ki Beti	Princess Madhuri a.k.a. Hunterwali	
1943	Mauj		
1948	11 O'Clock	Lakshmi	
1949	Dhoomketu (The Comet)		
1953	Jungle Ka Jawahar (Hero of the Forest)	Mala	
1956	Jungle Queen		
1956	Baghdad Ka Jadu	Yasmina	
1968	Khiladi		
