= J. B. H. Wadia =

Indian film director (1901–1986)

J. B. H. Wadia MBE
- Born: Jamshed Boman Homi Wadia; 13 September 1901
- Died: 4 January 1986 (aged 84)
- Occupation: Director
- Years active: 1928–1985
- Spouse: Hilla Patel
- Children: 2
- Relatives: See Wadia family

Jamshed Boman Homi Wadia MBE (13 September 1901 – 4 January 1986), commonly referred to as J. B. H. Wadia, was an Indian film director, screenwriter, producer and founder of Wadia Movietone Studio. He was born in prominent Parsi family which hailed from Surat, Gujarat whose ancestral business was ship building. Their family name of Wadia stands for master shipbuilders. In a family of entrepreneurs Wadia is credited with creation of movies involving populist stunt roles including those by Fearless Nadia and bringing concept of stunt actresses in Indian cinema.

== Film career ==
Wadia began his film making career with silent movies. Being an intellectual and avid writer he wrote scripts for his movies while his younger brother Homi Wadia who joined him in the business a few years later was usually tasked with directing them. He produced his first movie Vasant Leela in 1928, along with 11 other silent movies at the Kohinoor Studios in Dadar as well as under Deware Laboratories. These movies were modest successes and were mostly remakes of populist Hollywood classics. In the year 1933 he founded Wadia Movietone company and made his first Talkie movie Lal-E-Yaman, inspired by the Orientalist fantasy world espoused by the Arabian Nights and related themes. This movie's success helped establish Wadia Movietone as a studio to contend with, in partnership with his brother Homi, their distributor Manchesa B Billimoria and the Tata brothers Burjore and Nadirshaw.

Under the Wadia Movietone Studio banner Wadia introduced a variety of new concepts to Indian cinema starting with a stunt actress playing a leading role to a documentary newsreel, The Indian Gazette, to a feature-length documentary, Haripura Congress. As part of capturing cinematic recordings of early classical and semi-classical musicians and singers he made a series titled Wadia Movietone's Variety Programme, featuring legendary artistes such as Feroz Dastur, Bal Gandharva, Malika Pukhraj and Pandit Tirthankar. Wadia Movietone was also the first to create an Indian film without songs, Nav Jawan, the first Indian movie to be filmed in English (along with parallel Hindi and Bengali versions), The Court Dancer, the first Sindhi-language movie post-Partition, Ekta, and the very first Indian television series, Hotel Taj Mahal.

=== Movies from Wadia Movietone Studio ===
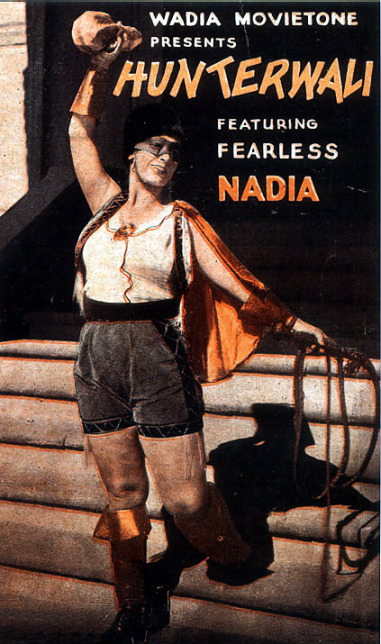
Poster of Hunterwali (1935) featuring Fearless Nadia was Wadia's big hit.

Some of the notable movies made by Movietone studio were Swadesh, Black Rose, Fauladi Mukka, Return of Toofan Mail, Jai Bharat, Kahan Hai Manzil Teri and movies starring Fearless Nadia namely Hunterwali - Miss Frontier Mail, Hurricane Hansa, Lootaru Lalna, Diamond Queen, Bambaiwali and Jungle Princess.

In the late 1930s, Wadia got involved in the Indian freedom struggle, initially inspired by the Indian Congress Party and then by M.N. Roy, the former Communist who turned away from Communism after a falling-out with Stalin and started his own party, Radical Humanism. The friendship with M.N. Roy added to his zeal for social and cultural change—including the emancipation of women, the casting aside of superstition and practices such as the caste system, and the need for all people to be educated if India was to be free and sustainable as an independent nation. His films, including the few stunt films he would make before abandoning that genre altogether, included these themes - such as Raj Nartaki, Vishwas, Balam, Madhosh, Mela, Ankh ki Sharam, Manthan and Amar Raj. The Fearless Nadia starrer Diamond Queen captures all these themes perfectly - blending calls for revolution and the eradication of corruption with stunts performed by Mary Ann Evans (a.k.a. Fearless Nadia) and John Cavas.

In January 1943, Wadia was honored with an MBE for his dedicated service to the war effort.

== Filmography ==
- Vasant Leela (1928) (producer)
- Lal-E-Yaman (1933)
- The Indian Gazette
- Haripura Congress
- Wadia Movietone's Variety Programme (series)
- Nav Jawan
- Ekta
- Hotel Taj Mahal (first Indian television series)
- Swadesh
- Black Rose
- Jai Bharat
- Vishwas
- Manthan
- Hunterwali (1935)
- Miss Frontier Mail (1936)
- Fauladi Mukka (1936)
- Hurricane Hansa (1937)
- Lootaru Lalna (1938)
- Kahan Hai Manzil Teri (1939)
- Diamond Queen (1940)
- Bambaiwali (1941)
- The Court Dancer (1941)
- Raj Nartaki (1941)
- Return of Toofan Mail (1942)
- Jungle Princess (1942)
- Ankh ki Sharam (1943)
- Amar Raj (1946)
- Mela (1948)
- Balam (1949)
- Madhosh (1951)
- Husn Ka Chor (1953)

== Family and personal life ==
Wadia was born to a prominent Parsi family of shipbuilders whose vessels had served the East Indian Company, including the opium trade with China. His own branch of the family had, however, fallen on hard times in the late 19th and early 20th century, and finances were tight. Wadia himself was well educated with and L.L.B. and M.A. degrees, as well as proficiency in Persian, Gujarati and Urdu (languages he wrote poetry in as well). Although he tried to carve out a career in finance and law, his true passion was the cinema, which he encountered via the initial offerings of the Lumiere Brothers and other films that made their way to British India. When JBH turned to film-making, his family were initially not at all supportive - and were even more dismayed when his younger brother Homi decided to join him. However, with the success of their movies, the rest of the family eventually came around.

It was a very conservative family, with JBH Wadia perhaps the only genuine rebel among them. His discovery of Mary Ann Evans who he immortalized as Fearless Nadia, the stunt queen par excellence, led to Homi falling in love with Mary – much against the rest of the family's wishes. Indeed, although JBH Wadia encouraged them to defy the family, including their orthodox mother Dhunmai, Homi could not bring himself to marry Mary until his mother died. By the time they got married in 1961, they were too old to have their own children, although Homi and Mary eventually formally adopted Bobby Jones, who was either Mary's much younger brother (the story that was always pushed forward) or perhaps her real son from a prior relationship.

Wadia was married to Hilla Patel, to whom he was distantly related. They had two children, a son named Vinci and a daughter named Haidee.

Vinci married Nargis Khambata, who eventually became the first woman in Asia to start her own advertising agency, Interpublicity, or Interpub. Haidee married a German, Gerhard Meier, and moved to Boblingen, Germany.

Vinci and Nargis had two children: Roy (named after M.N. Roy), who became a journalist at CNN) and eventually joined the United Nations, and Riyad, who resurrected the Wadia Movietone banner and the Fearless Nadia legend during his brief life with an award-winning documentary on Nadia, titled "Fearless: The Hunterwali Story." Riyad also produced India's first gay-themed film, a short titled BOMgAY. Riyad died in 2003 at the age of 36.

JBH Wadia died in 1986 due to cancer, triggered by a fall endured when crossing the road near his home and being struck by a car.
