= John Cawas =

- Born: 1910; Jabalpur
- Died: 4 October 1993 (aged 82–83); Mumbai, India
- Occupations: Stuntman, actor

John Cawas (1910 – 4 October 1993) was a stuntman and actor in Hindi movies. Cawas made his debut in the Hindi film Hunterwali (1935), which became a career-defining movie for Fearless Nadia and Wadia Movietone. Cawas himself was famous for his performance of Tarzan in various movies.

== Early life ==
Born in 1910 in Jabalpur in a Parsi family, Cawas pursued a career of professional body building and won the 1930 All-India Bodybuilding Championship.

== Film career ==
The 1930s was an era of adventure movies for Hindi cinema, and Cawas got his first break as a swordsman in Hunterwali along with Nadia and Boman Shroff. This role along with similar roles in subsequent sequel remakes of this movie helped Cawas establish himself as a professional stuntman and actor.

His portrayal of Tarzan in Wadia Movietone's Toofani Tarzan was a career-defining role for him.
