= One World with Deepak Chopra =

American television series

- Created by: Martine Dubin Company
- Presented by: Deepak Chopra
- Music by: Dennis White a.k.a. Static Revenger
- Country of origin: United States
- Original language: English
- No. of episodes: 152

Production
- Executive producer: Martine Dubin
- Production locations: NASDAQ MarketSite, SiriusXM, ABC Home's Deepak Homebase, Delos Living
- Camera setup: Multi-camera
- Running time: 22-44 minutes
- Production company: Martine Dubin Company

Original release
- Network: Newswire.fm
- Release: October 16, 2013 – present

One World is a televised series of in-depth interviews hosted by Deepak Chopra, and directed and executively produced by Martine Dubin. It is an original series produced by the Martine Dubin Company for NEWSWIRE.FM, featuring newsmakers across the professional spectrum.

== Distribution ==
One World episodes are available on-demand, and by linear digital broadcasting on the digital broadcasting on the digital broadcast network NEWSWIREFM, becoming popular worldwide.

The show has also been available via SONIFI Solutions in 1.4 million hotel rooms across North America.

In Toronto, Canada, the series was also available for TTC riders in the TTC subway system through BAI Canada and TConnect Wifi.

As of March 2015, One World is also available on John Hendricks’ global ad-free subscription video on-demand service CuriosityStream.

One World was also broadcast on the SiriusXM Satellite Radio Oprah Radio channel in the US and Canada, Sirius 204/XM107, Mondays at 7 pm ET, prior to the channel going off the air in January 2015.

== History ==
One World premiered on October 16, 2013. As part of the launch of the One World series, host Deepak Chopra and executive producer and director Martine Dubin, along with Ray Chambers, Frederique van der Wal, Paulette Cole, Paul Scialla, and the One World production crew rang the Opening Bell at the NASDAQ MarketSite in Times Square.

== Music ==
One World's music is composed and produced by Dennis White, a.k.a. Static Revenger.

== Guests ==
Past guests include:

- Cameron Alborzian
- Shiva Ayyadurai
- Dr. Anirban Bandyopadhyay
- Cori Bargmann
- Nigel Barker
- Ala'a Basatneh
- Stacey Bendet
- H.A. Berlin
- Charles Best
- Dr. Mohammad Bhuiyan
- Neil Blumenthal
- Chris Burch
- Charisma Carpenter
- Ray Chambers
- Desmond Child
- Mallika Chopra
- Sanjiv Chopra
- Kenneth Cole
- Celine Cousteau
- Fabien Cousteau
- Willem Dafoe
- William Davis (cardiologist)
- Sharad Devarajan
- DJ Spooky
- Fran Drescher
- Esther Dyson
- Mick Ebeling
- Diane Von Furstenberg
- Johan Ernst Nilson
- David Gorodyansky
- Vani Hari
- Annette Herfkens
- Sylvia Ann Hewlett
- Arianna Huffington
- Mark Hyman (doctor)
- JeromeASF
- Jazz Johnson
- Wayne Jonas
- Michio Kaku
- Donna Karan
- Ben Kaufman
- Georg Kell
- Dr. Raphael Kellman
- Dacher Keltner
- Calvin Klein
- John Kluge Jr.
- Ken Kobayashi
- Krishna Das
- Nicholas Kristof
- Jaron Lanier
- Lauren Bush Lauren
- Michael Lazerow
- Sugar Ray Leonard (Olympics)
- Eric Lichtblau
- Martin Lindstrom
- Lucy Liu
- Lisa Lovatt-Smith
- Tara Mandal
- Mike D
- Lisa Miller
- Keith Mitchell
- Leonard Mlodinow
- Luc Montagnier
- Trevor Moran
- Shree K. Nayar
- Hafez Nazeri
- Marc Ostrofsky
- Alan Patricof
- Benjamin Patton
- Bruce Poon Tip
- Courtney Reum
- Michael Roizen
- David Rose
- Linda Rottenberg
- Rachel Roy
- Tim Ryan (politician)
- Kabir Sehgal
- Dov Seidman
- Jason Silva
- Russell Simmons
- Martha Stewart
- Tara Stiles
- Rudolph E. Tanzi
- Max Tegmark
- Peter Thum
- Robert Thurman
- Paul Tudor Jones
- Frederique van der Wal
- Stephanie Watson
- Sheryl Wudunn
- Randi Zuckerberg
