= De Villacis =

de Villacis is a surname. Notable people with the surname include:

- Nicolás de Villacis (1616–1694), Spanish Baroque painter
- Roberto de Villacis (born 1967), Ecuadorian-American fashion designer and artist

== See also ==
- Villacis
