= Wolfgang Wild (curator) =

British blogger

- Notable work: Founder of Retronaut.
- Website: Retronaut.com

Wolfgang "Chris" Wild is a curator, writer, speaker and creator of the history brand Retronaut.

== Retronaut ==
Wild started Retronaut in January 2010, sharing daily archival images that show "the past like you wouldn't believe". As Wild has described, during his time working in museums and archives: "there were some objects and pictures I saw that for me had an enormous and seemingly untapped power – a power to disrupt our sense of time, to dissolve the barrier between present and past. I figured that if I could harness that power, I might be able to build something akin to a time-machine. Hence Retronaut."

In its article on Retronaut, Fast Company wrote: "the images on Retronaut are chosen to make the viewer feel like they’re looking not at the past, but rather at a different version of the present"

In November 2013, Retronaut was listed by The Times as one of "The 50 people you should follow on Twitter".

In August 2014, Mashable announced that Wild had joined Mashable's editorial team and that from September 2014, Mashable would be the exclusive online home of the Retronaut brand of historical photo curation. In August 2015, Retronaut was announced as a finalist in the 2015 Online Journalism Awards.

Retronaut began a new licensing deal with US site Considerable in November 2018.

Wild and Retronaut collaborated with print and card makers Prelogram on a series of exclusive Retronaut cards in Fall 2015.

In September 2016, Retronaut became a curating partner for Meural's digital canvas, showcasing a new collection each month.

== Curator ==
During 2014, Wild was guest curator at Northumberland Museums and Archives, concluding in a six-month physical exhibition at Woodhorn (Museum) of around 25 pictures from the Northumberland Archives.

The Retronaut Woodhorn project was shortlisted for the Museums and Heritage Awards for Excellence 2015.

Wild was Guest Curator for the SC Exhibitions Magazine 2015, 2016 and 2017.

In February 2016, Wild's pop-up show Retronaut's New York opened on 5th Avenue, New York, at Premier Exhibitions. The show featured 30 panoramic photographs of New York at the end of the nineteenth and beginning of the twentieth centuries.

Wild was a creative consultant to the Magic City: The Art of the Street exhibition, opened in Dresden, Germany in October 2016.

== Writer ==
Wild's first book, "Retronaut: A Photographic Time Machine", was published by National Geographic in September 2014. The book received a starred review from Publishers Weekly, saying "With every page comes a surprise; this terrific collection never ceases to entertain".

"Retronaut: A Photographic Time Machine" was shortlisted for the AEJMC Best Journalism and Mass Communication History Book Award 2014.

Two further books "The Retronaut Guide to Raising Children" and "The Retronaut Guide to Keeping Pets" were published in September 2016 by Ilex.

Wild wrote about the Winchester School of Art Library Rotunda for the Twentieth Century Society journal. Wild has also contributed an article on the history of denim and the American frontier to Volume Three of Ernest Journal.

"The Paper Time Machine" was shortlisted for the British Book Design & Production Awards 2018.

== Speaker ==
Wild has been a speaker at TEDGlobal (Oxford, 2010), Lost Lectures (London 2012), DISH (Rotterdam, 2013), Remix London (2012, 2014), Remix New York (2014), Birdie Photography Conference (London, 2014), Culture Jam (Vienna, 2015), Let's Get Real (Brighton, 2015), International Culture Forum (St Petersburg, 2015), The Story (London, 2016), Digikult (Gothburg, 2017), Dealer Day (Verona, 2017), Brandy (Milan, 2017), RiseUp (Cairo, 2017), the British Association of Picture Libraries and Agencies (Wellcome Trust, 2016, Museum of London, 2018), CITEMOS (Vicenza, 2018) and Curating Social Media (The Photographers Gallery, London, 2019).

== Museumpreneurs ==
In 2011, Wild set up the Museumpreneurs project and website with Shire Books, to showcase and encourage entrepreneurial activity in the museum sector. The project set out its mission statement: “We want to explore what it means for a museum to be entrepreneurial, we want to showcase museums already being entrepreneurial, and we want to help more museums be more entrepreneurial more of the time”. Wild presented on the project at the 2011 Museums Galleries Scotland conference.

In his 2011 keynote speech to the Museums Association conference, Ed Vaizey MP, and Minister for Culture, Communications and Creative Industries talked about the project: "Look at the Museumpreneurs website. Many businesses and many retailers would jump at the chance to work with museums in this way. I was delighted to find their mission statement. For better or worse, that sums up my approach pretty well."

== Musician ==
"Faith in You", Wild's remix of British Art rock band No-Man's song "You Grow More Beautiful", was released on the Flowermix album under the name The Prophets of Bliss. Wild had previously appeared in the video for No-Man's "Colours" single (One Little Indian) in 1990.

In 1993, Steven Wilson remixed Wild's track "Dub Zero". The remix was released in 2004 on Wilson's "Unreleased Electronic Music Vol. 1".
