= Sina Bathaie =

Sina Bathaie سینا بطحایی
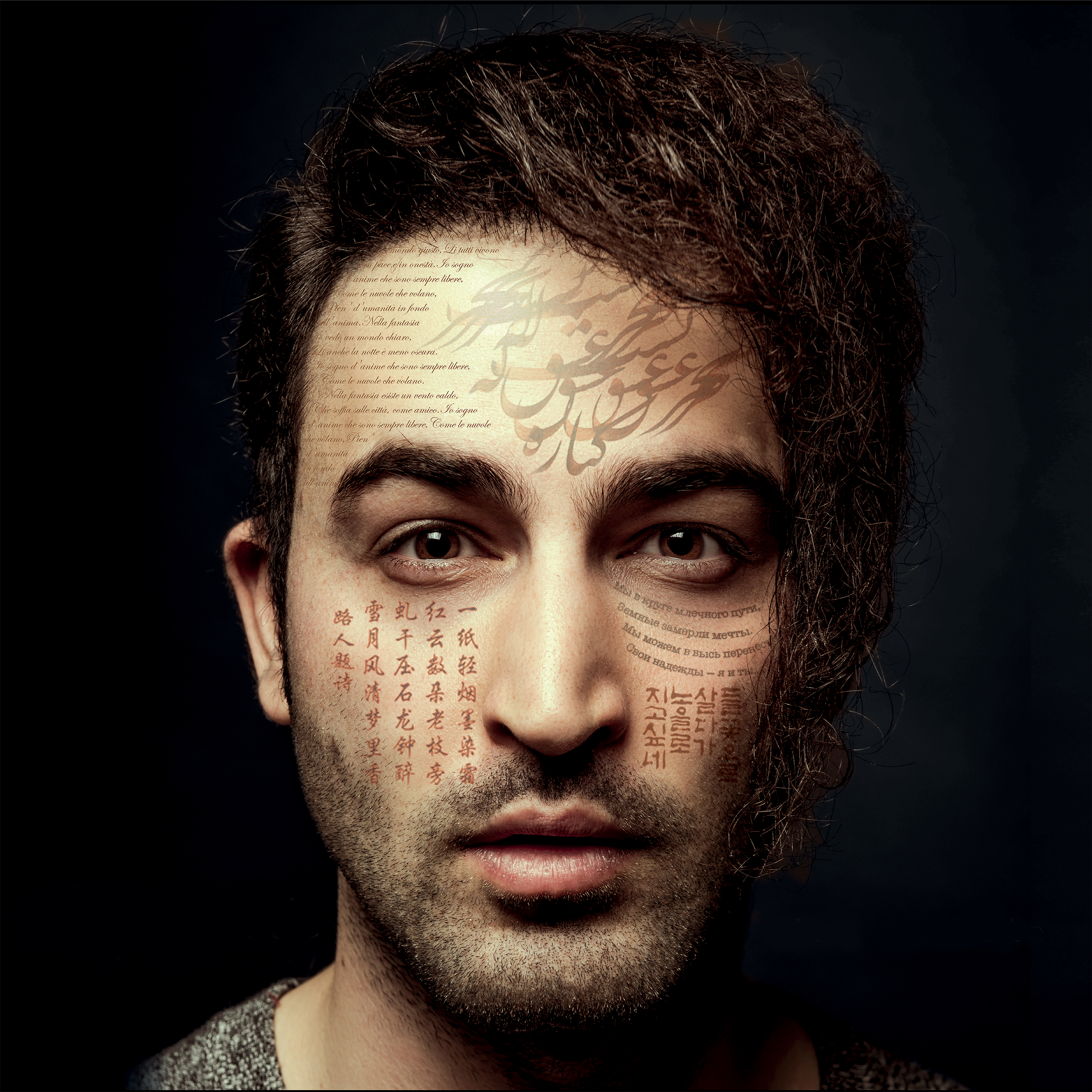
- Sina Bathaie on the cover of Ray of Hope album

Background information
- Born: December 8, 1986 (age 39); Yazd, Iran
- Genres: World fusion, film scores, electronic
- Occupations: Composer, santur player
- Instruments: Santur, Piano, Oud, Baglama, Ukulele
- Years active: 2002–present
- Label: Windcatcher Records
- Website: http://www.sinabathaie.com

Sina Bathaie (Persian: سینا بطحایی; born December 8, 1986) is an Iranian–Canadian musician and film scorer, noted for his style of blending Persian traditional music and electronic music, especially by mixing santur and electronica. His track "Seven Ponds" was ranked No. 73 on Canada's Top 100 songs of 2024 by Canadian Broadcasting Corporation.

== Life ==
Sina Bathaie was born in December 8, 1986 in Yazd. His father Javad Bathaie is a Santur master and player and Sina learned playing this instrument from him at the age of 7. He went on to learn to play the tar from Keivan Saket and oud from Mohammad Firouzi. ‌Bathaie who studied engineering at the university organized the country's first student ensemble festival at Amirkabir University of Technology in 2007.

== Work ==
Bathaie's music has been described as Persian progressive house, using a fusion of traditional Eastern melodies and modern electronic rhythms. He has composed music scores for films such as The Horse Latitudes, Un royaume déménage, Ameno and Mr Settled Immigrant.

=== Reception ===
The CBC Radio host Errol Nazareth CBC radio host cites their santur playing as "mesmerizing", and The WholeNote's Editor's Corner, described them as "one of Toronto's best kept secrets". His track "Seven Ponds" was ranked #73 on Canada's Top 100 songs of 2024 by Canadian Broadcasting Corporation.

==== Ray of Hope (2017) ====
Ray of Hope is a primarily instrumental album centered on the Persian hammered dulcimer, the album blends Middle Eastern music traditions with Western popular and classical idioms, incorporating guitar (Alexei Orechin, Nima Ahmadieh), bass (Oriana Barbato, Semco Salehi), cello (Raphael Weinroth-Browne), percussion (Siavash Sadr Mahdavi), and guest appearances by drummer Adam Campbell and vocalist Alireza Mahdizadeh.

The album is thematically inspired by multilingual poetic verses celebrating peace, hope, and love, with texts in Farsi, Italian, Russian, Chinese, and Korean visually represented on the cover art. Its compositions traverse diverse stylistic territories: Rebirth juxtaposes Appalachian music resonances with cello-led lyricism; the title track, "Ray of Hope", moves from the sounds of conflict to a triumphant ensemble climax; and Invocation showcases Bathaie's santur technique in a solo setting. Other tracks include "Journey", "Into the Sky", "I Remember", "Dance of Delight", the vocal piece "Lullaby of Spring", and the closing track "Light Like a Feather".
