= The Passion of Rumi =

Studio album by Shahram Nazeri
- Released: August 21, 2007
- Genre: World

The Passion of Rumi is an album by singer Shahram Nazeri to commemorate the 700th anniversary of the birth of the Iranian poet Rumi. It was recorded in collaboration with Nazeri's son Hafez, who plays the setar.

== Description ==
Passion of Rumi is a celebration of the poetry of Rumi with a new and fresh musical approach, commemorating the international year of Mawlana Jalal ad-Din Balkhi Rumi. This recording is the first work of Shahram Nazeri in collaboration with his son, Hafez Nazeri, the composer of this work. Shahram Nazeri, the best-known vocalist of Iran, has been a pioneer in incorporating the poetry of Rumi in Persian classical music. This live recording was made at a historical festival in Iran with more than 140,000 attendees over 5 days at the Sa'ad Abad Palace in Tehran. Passion of Rumi will attract not only lovers of classical and folk Persian music, and admirers of the phenomenal poetry of Rumi, but also audiences who enjoy innovation and the beautiful harmony that can be created from the combination of different musical traditions and cultures.

== Track listing ==
1. Mystic, Poet: Rumi
2. EVAN Madaen
3. Enchanted I, Poet: Shahram Nazeri - Hafez Nazeri
4. Journey to Eternity
5. Fanayam Man ı, Poet: Rumi
6. Beyond, Poet: Rumi
7. Fanayam Man, Poet: Rumi
8. In Solitude
9. The passion of Rumi, Poet: Rumi

== Personnel ==
- Vocals by Shahram Nazeri
- Composed by Hafez Nazeri
- Mohammad Firouzi: Barbat
- Shervin Moahjer: Kamancheh and Kamancheh alto
- Pejham Akhavas: Tombak and Damam
- Hafez Nazeri: Setar
- Siavash Nazeri: daf
