= Wolfgang Wild =

Wolfgang Wild may refer to:

- Wolfgang Wild (curator), English curator, writer and speaker
- Wolfgang Wild (physicist), German nuclear physicist, academic administrator and politician
