= 2011 Sony Ericsson Open – Women's singles qualifying =

Women's singles qualifying
- 2011 Sony Ericsson Open

Events
Singles	men	women
Doubles	men	women
← 2010 ·	Sony Ericsson Open	· 2012 →

This article displays the qualifying draw of the 2011 Sony Ericsson Open.

== Players ==
=== Seeds ===
1. (Australia) Jelena Dokić (qualified)
2. (Canada) Rebecca Marino (first round)
3. (Slovakia) Magdaléna Rybáriková (first round)
4. (Russia) Evgeniya Rodina (first round)
5. (China) Zhang Shuai (qualified)
6. (Russia) Ksenia Pervak (qualified)
7. (Czech Republic) Lucie Hradecká (qualified)
8. (Czech Republic) Renata Voráčová (qualifying competition)
9. (Austria) Tamira Paszek (first round)
10. (Czech Republic) Andrea Hlaváčková (first round)
11. (Croatia) Mirjana Lučić (first round)
12. (United States) Jill Craybas (first round)
13. (Italy) Alberta Brianti (first round)
14. (United States) Vania King (first round)
15. (Czech Republic) Sandra Záhlavová (first round)
16. (Austria) Patricia Mayr-Achleitner (first round)
17. (Belgium) Kirsten Flipkens (qualifying competition)
18. (Japan) Junri Namigata (qualifying competition)
19. (India) Sania Mirza (qualified)
20. (United Kingdom) Anne Keothavong (first round)
21. (Netherlands) Arantxa Rus (qualified)
22. (France) Pauline Parmentier (first round)
23. (United States) Christina McHale (qualifying competition)
24. (Ukraine) Kateryna Bondarenko (first round)

=== Qualifiers ===
1. (Australia) Jelena Dokić
2. (United States) Jamie Hampton
3. (Netherlands) Arantxa Rus
4. (United States) Sloane Stephens
5. (China) Zhang Shuai
6. (Russia) Ksenia Pervak
7. (Czech Republic) Lucie Hradecká
8. (India) Sania Mirza
9. (Georgia (country)) Anna Tatishvili
10. (Chinese Taipei) Chan Yung-jan
11. (Russia) Vesna Manasieva
12. (Belarus) Anastasiya Yakimova

== Qualifying draw ==
=== Key ===
- Q = Qualifier
- WC = Wild card
- LL = Lucky loser
- Alt = Alternate
- SE = Special exempt
- PR = Protected ranking
- ITF = ITF entry
- JE = Junior exempt
- w/o = Walkover
- r = Retired
- d = Defaulted
- SR = Special ranking

=== First qualifier ===
First round
1	(Australia) Jelena Dokić	5	6	6
(Germany) Tatjana Malek	7	3	4
WC	(Germany) Carina Witthöft	2	2
23	(United States) Christina McHale	6	6

Qualifying competition
1	(Australia) Jelena Dokić	3	7	6
23	(United States) Christina McHale	6	6^{3}	2

=== Second qualifier ===
First round
2	(Canada) Rebecca Marino	1	5
(United States) Jamie Hampton	6	7
(Ukraine) Lesya Tsurenko	2	2
17	(Belgium) Kirsten Flipkens	6	6

Qualifying competition
(United States) Jamie Hampton	5	6	6
17	(Belgium) Kirsten Flipkens	7	4	2

=== Third qualifier ===
First round
3	(Slovakia) Magdaléna Rybáriková	6	5	0
WC	(Portugal) Michelle Larcher de Brito	2	7	6
(Japan) Misaki Doi	1	2
21	(Netherlands) Arantxa Rus	6	6

Qualifying competition
WC	(Portugal) Michelle Larcher de Brito	4	2
21	(Netherlands) Arantxa Rus	6	6

=== Fourth qualifier ===
First round
4	(Russia) Evgeniya Rodina	6	4	3
WC	(United States) Sloane Stephens	3	6	6
WC	(Australia) Sophie Ferguson	6	3	6
13	(Italy) Alberta Brianti	4	6	2

Qualifying competition
WC	(United States) Sloane Stephens	7	6
WC	(Australia) Sophie Ferguson	6^{4}	1

=== Fifth qualifier ===
First round
5	(China) Zhang Shuai	6	6
(United States) Alison Riske	4	4
(Czech Republic) Eva Birnerová	7	4	6
22	(France) Pauline Parmentier	5	6	3

Qualifying competition
5	(China) Zhang Shuai	6	2	6
(Czech Republic) Eva Birnerová	2	6	4

=== Sixth qualifier ===
First round
6	(Russia) Ksenia Pervak	6	4	6
(Slovakia) Zuzana Kučová	4	6	2
WC	(Canada) Stéphanie Dubois	6	6^{5}	3
18	(Japan) Junri Namigata	3	7	6

Qualifying competition
6	(Russia) Ksenia Pervak	6	6
18	(Japan) Junri Namigata	1	2

=== Seventh qualifier ===
First round
7	(Czech Republic) Lucie Hradecká	6	6
WC	(United States) Beatrice Capra	3	1
(United States) Irina Falconi	4	6	6
15	(Czech Republic) Sandra Záhlavová	6	1	3

Qualifying competition
7	(Czech Republic) Lucie Hradecká	6	5	6
(United States) Irina Falconi	1	7	1

=== Eighth qualifier ===
First round
8	(Czech Republic) Renata Voráčová	6	6
(Italy) Corinna Dentoni	3	3
(China) Han Xinyun	5	0
19	(India) Sania Mirza	7	6

Qualifying competition
8	(Czech Republic) Renata Voráčová	4	2
19	(India) Sania Mirza	6	6

=== Ninth qualifier ===
First round
9	(Austria) Tamira Paszek	2	6	4
(Spain) Nuria Llagostera Vives	6	3	6
(Georgia (country)) Anna Tatishvili	6	6
16	(Austria) Patricia Mayr-Achleitner	4	3

Qualifying competition
(Spain) Nuria Llagostera Vives	3	6	4
(Georgia (country)) Anna Tatishvili	6	4	6

=== Tenth qualifier ===
First round
10	(Czech Republic) Andrea Hlaváčková	6^{4}	6^{1}
(Chinese Taipei) Chan Yung-jan	7	7
(Russia) Anastasia Pivovarova	6	6
20	(United Kingdom) Anne Keothavong	4	0

Qualifying competition
(Chinese Taipei) Chan Yung-jan	6	3	6
(Russia) Anastasia Pivovarova	3	6	2

=== Eleventh qualifier ===
First round
11	(Croatia) Mirjana Lučić	2	4
(Austria) Yvonne Meusburger	6	6
(Russia) Vesna Manasieva	6	6
14	(United States) Vania King	2	1

Qualifying competition
(Austria) Yvonne Meusburger	2	7	3
(Russia) Vesna Manasieva	6	6^{0}	6

=== Twelfth qualifier ===
First round
12	(United States) Jill Craybas	3	7	1
WC	(United States) Lauren Davis	6	5	6
(Belarus) Anastasiya Yakimova	6	3	6
24	(Ukraine) Kateryna Bondarenko	3	6	4

Qualifying competition
WC	(United States) Lauren Davis	4	1
(Belarus) Anastasiya Yakimova	6	6
