= Lauren Davis =

American tennis player (born 1993)

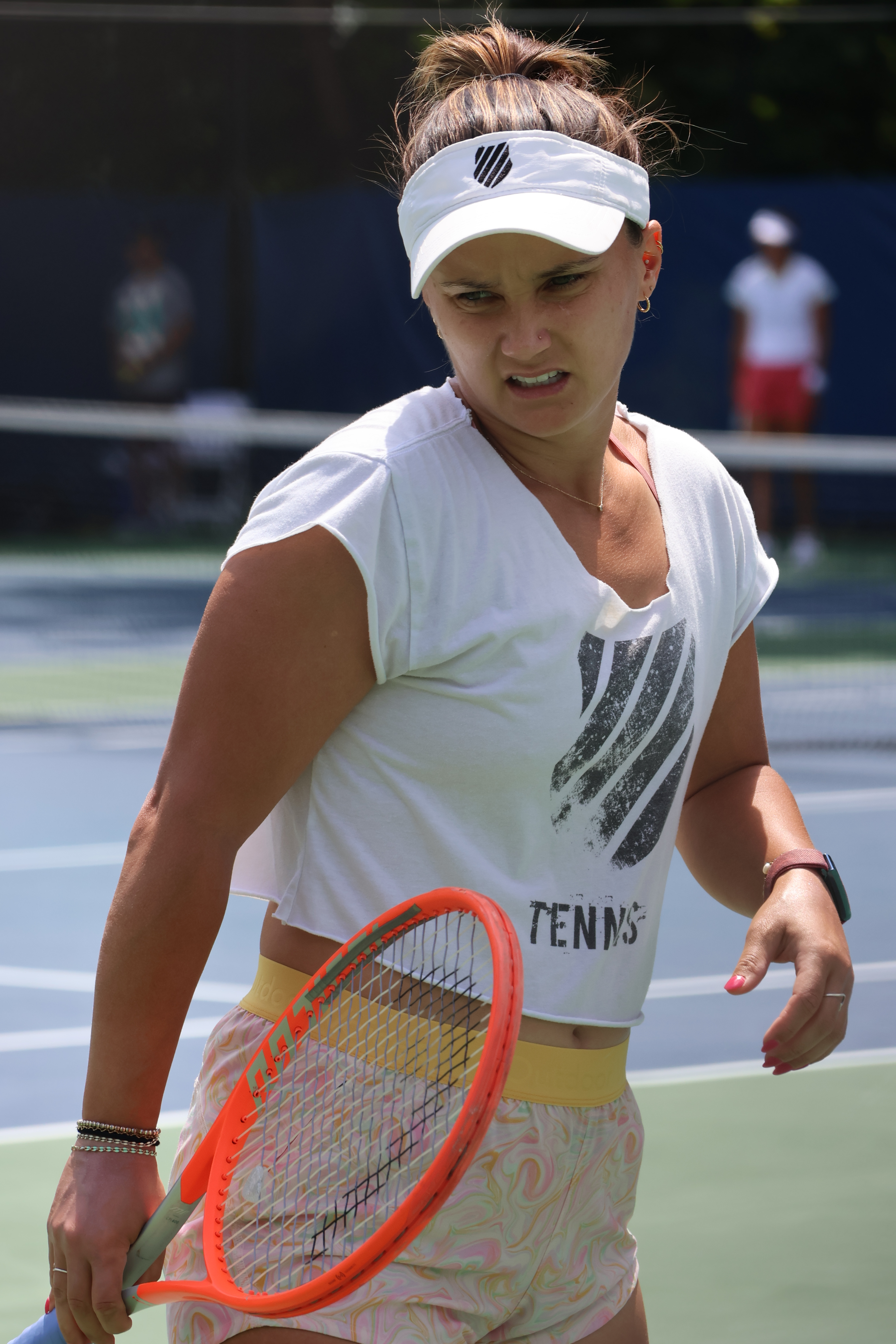
- Davis at the 2023 Washington Open
- Country (sports): United States
- Residence: Boca Raton, Florida, U.S.
- Born: October 9, 1993 (age 33) Gates Mills, Ohio, U.S.
- Height: 5 ft 2 in (1.57 m)
- Turned pro: January 2011
- Retired: 2025
- Coach: Eddie Elliott
- Prize money: $5,241,772

Singles
- Career record: 393–307
- Career titles: 2
- Highest ranking: No. 26 (22 May 2017)

Grand Slam singles results
- Australian Open: 3R (2014, 2016, 2018)
- French Open: 2R (2012, 2019, 2023)
- Wimbledon: 3R (2014, 2019)
- US Open: 3R (2022)

Doubles
- Career record: 38–82
- Career titles: 0
- Highest ranking: No. 137 (15 January 2018)

Grand Slam doubles results
- Australian Open: 2R (2017, 2020)
- French Open: 2R (2013, 2020)
- Wimbledon: 2R (2015, 2023)
- US Open: 2R (2014)

Grand Slam mixed doubles results
- US Open: 1R (2014, 2015)

Team competitions
- Fed Cup: 1–2

Lauren Davis (born October 9, 1993) is an American former professional tennis player. Known for her aggressive backhand, speed, and clay-court strength, she won two singles titles on the WTA Tour and reached a career-high singles ranking of world No. 26, in May 2017. She also won eight singles titles on the ITF Women's Circuit.

== Early life ==
Davis was born on 9 October 1993 in Gates Mills, Ohio. She began playing tennis at age nine. Upon turning 16, she left her hometown for training at the Evert Tennis Academy. Davis' parents both work in the medical profession. Her mother is a nurse and still resides in Gates Mills, and her father, William Davis, a well known author of "Wheat Belly", is a cardiologist working in Wisconsin.

== Career ==
=== Juniors ===
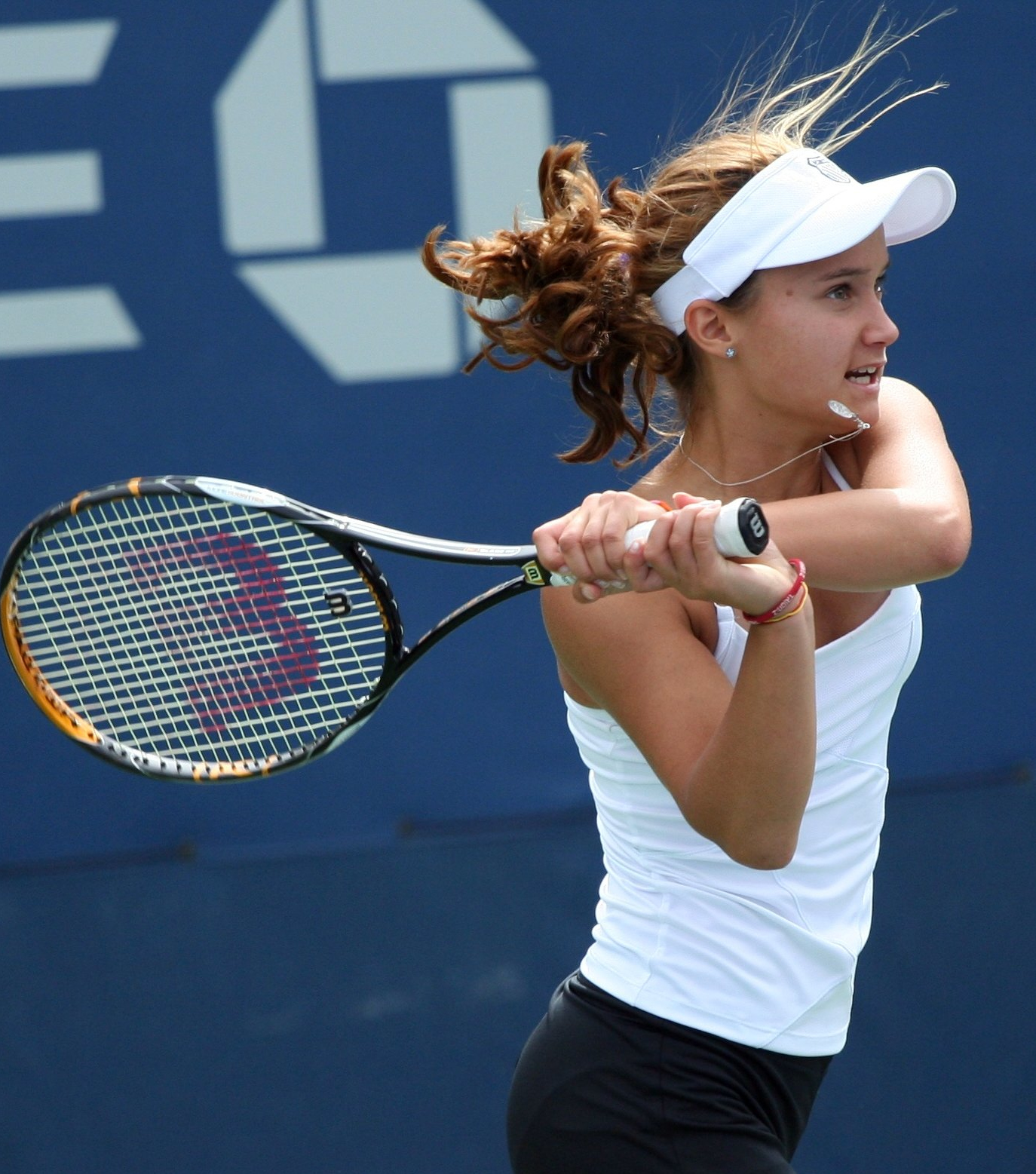
Davis at the 2009 US Open as a junior

Davis reached a career-high ranking of No. 3 as a junior. She made her debut on the ITF Junior Circuit in September 2008 at the age of 14, via wildcard at the 2008 US Open, losing to Ajla Tomljanović.

She started 2009 season with a third-round appearance at the Grade-1 tournament in Carson, California, after which she won her first singles junior tournament, a Grade-3 International Grass Court Championships in Philadelphia, when she defeated Brooke Bolender in three sets. By the end of the 2009, she made a quarterfinal appearance at the US Open, won a Grade-1 Yucatán World Cup in Mérida on the hardcourt and made a third-round loss at the Orange Bowl.

In 2010, Davis reached one quarterfinal in the first four months, before reaching the final of the Easter Bowl, losing to Krista Hardebeck. She again lost a final, this time in the 51st Trofeo Bonfiglio to Beatrice Capra. In November 2010, she went on an 18-match winning streak, winning the Grade-1 tournaments Yucatán World Cup and the Eddie Herr youth tournament, as well as the Grade-A Orange Bowl event.

While still a junior, Davis won her first professional title on clay at a USTA tournament in Williamsburg, Virginia in 2010. She then went on a 27-match win streak, and won her second pro title in Puerto Rico. She ended her junior career with a third-round appearance at the 2011 Australian Open.

=== 2011: Turning professional ===
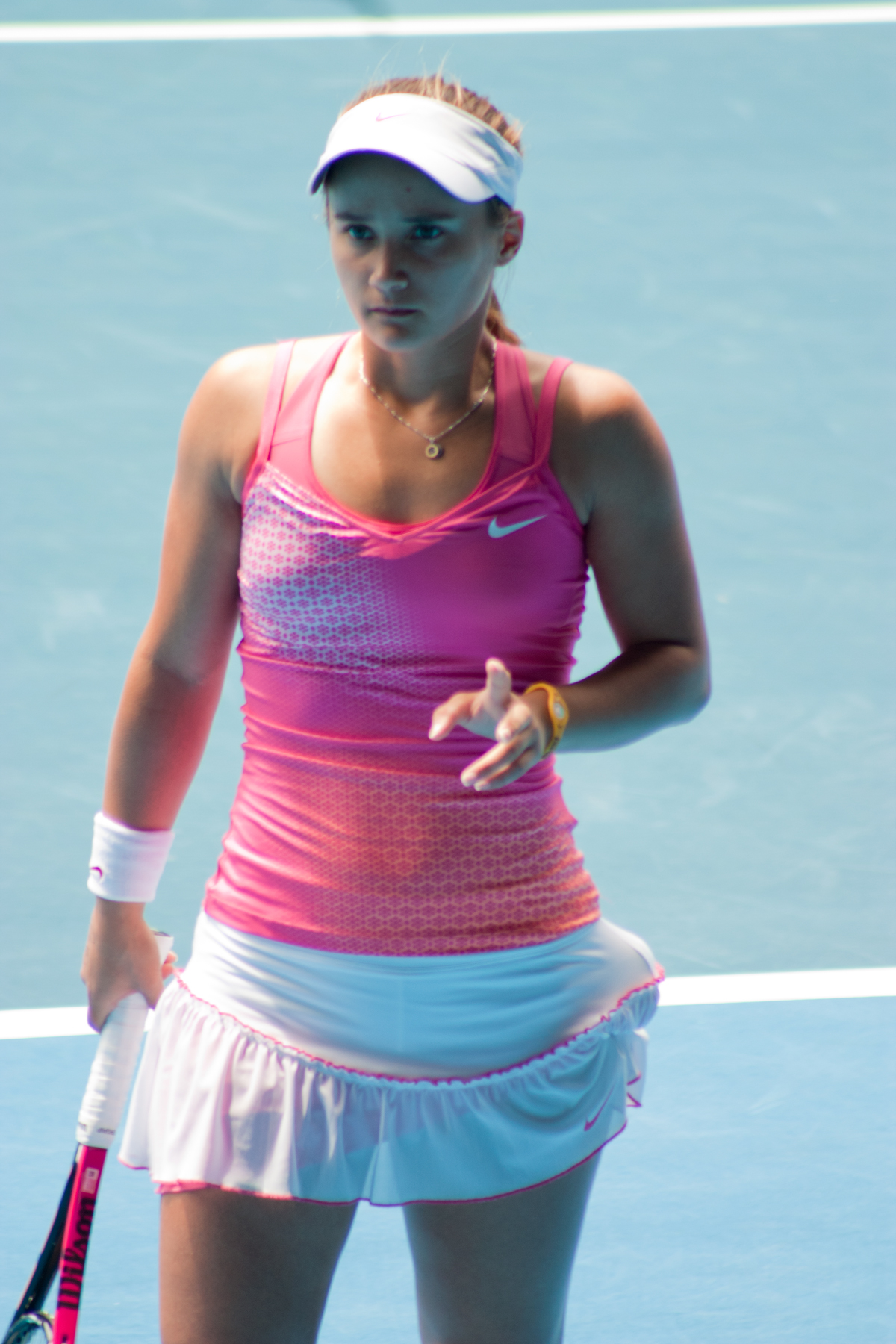
... at the 2011 Australian Open

Davis was awarded a wildcard into the Australian Open, where she lost her first Grand Slam appearance against fifth-seeded Samantha Stosur in the first round. She officially turned professional in 2011 and won her first WTA Tour match in the Miami Open qualifying by beating Jill Craybas, in three sets. She then lost to Anastasiya Yakimova.

In the qualifying for the Charleston Open, Davis lost to Stéphanie Foretz. While waiting to give a post-match interview in a corporate booth, she was knocked unconscious when lighting equipment fell on her head. She suffered a concussion that kept her out of competition for months and left her suffering from occasional migraines for several months after that.

It was a windy day, and a whole big camera just blew onto my head. I didn't do anything physical for a long time. I didn't read anything. The only thing I could do was watch TV, eat and sleep. I had a headache, 24–7, that never went away. — Davis, on her injury

In October 2013, Davis filed a lawsuit against Production Design Associates and High Output, who had been hired by sponsors Dove to provide and install video and lighting equipment for the interview booths. Her complaint stated:

While plaintiff was waiting to be interviewed, a piece of lighting and video equipment selected, provided and installed by defendants fell and struck plaintiff in the head, knocking her unconscious. [Plaintiff] continues to suffer from serious, severe and painful head trauma and injuries including a concussion, post-concussion syndrome with its resulting emotional effects, and severe and long-term headaches. Plaintiff has required expensive and long term medical treatment including multiple emergency room visits, evaluation and treatment by specialists, diagnostic tests such as CT scans and MRI, prescription medications, and other treatments and will continue to require medical care in the future.

She sought actual and punitive damages for negligence and gross negligence.

=== 2012–13: First major match win ===
At the 2012 Indian Wells Open, she defeated Petra Martić in the first round and then lost to Nadia Petrova in the round of 64. She then lost in the first round of the Miami Open to Vera Dushevina.

Davis made it through the qualifying rounds of the 2012 French Open, where she won her first major main-draw match against 30th seed Mona Barthel in straight sets. In the second round, she lost to fellow American Christina McHale, in straight sets.

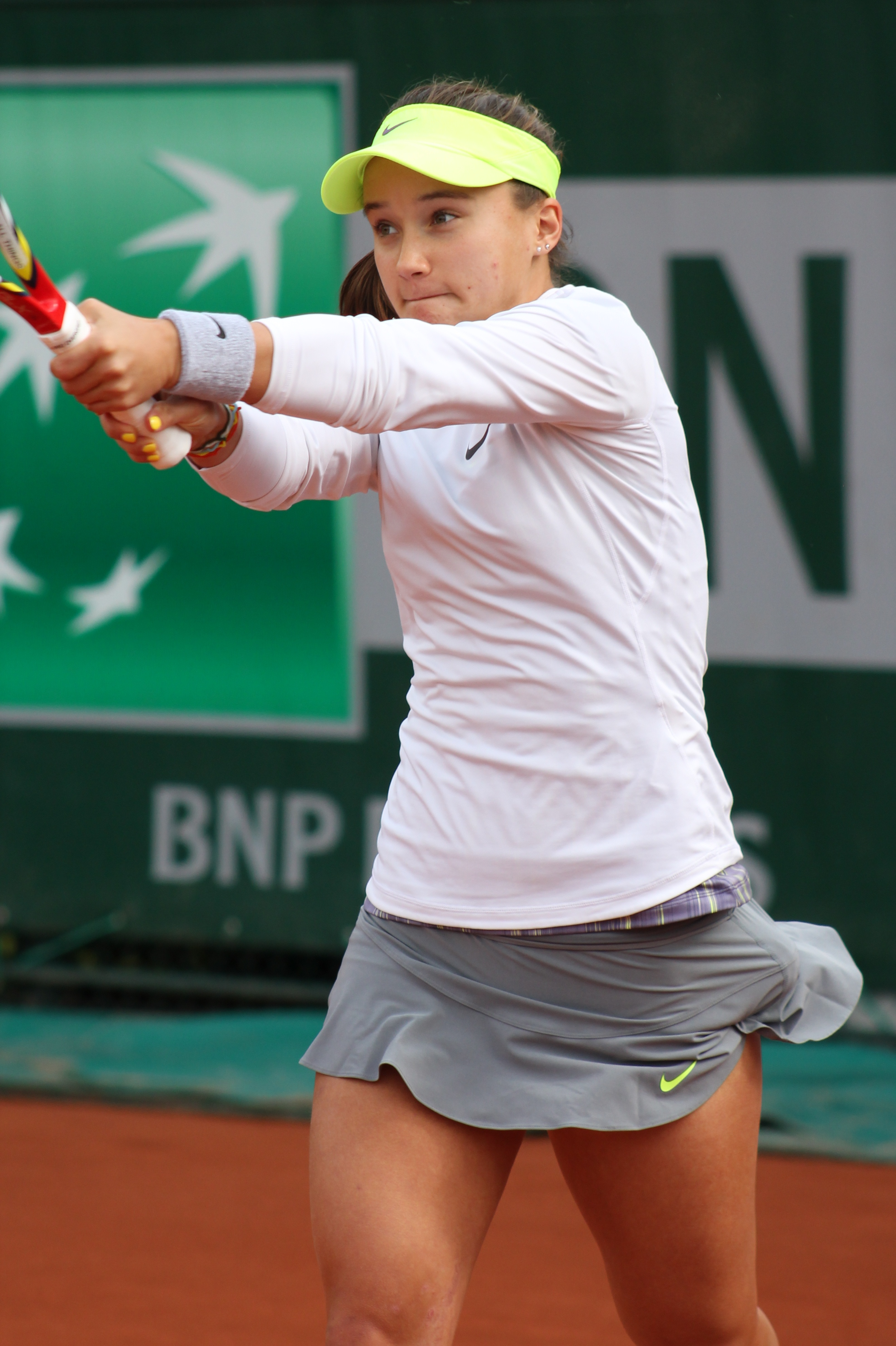
... at the 2013 French Open

Davis reached her second career quarterfinal at the 2013 Hobart International, where she lost to Sloane Stephens. In February 2013, she won the United States Tennis Association (USTA) Dow Classic title by defeating Alja Tomljanović in the final.

She replaced an injured Victoria Azarenka at the 2013 Miami Open, where she defeated Madison Keys in the second round. In the third round, she faced Alizé Cornet and lost in three sets. During the match, Davis was stung on the buttocks by a wasp in the third set. Though it caused her significant pain, Davis refused to blame her loss on it. The overwhelming heat affected Davis and Cornet as both players left the court in wheelchairs.

Davis then reached the quarterfinals of the Monterrey Open, where she lost to the eventual champion, Anastasia Pavlyuchenkova. She was knocked out in the first round of the French Open, Wimbledon and the US Open. Her furthest advance for the remainder of 2013 was a quarterfinal appearance at the Bell Challenge in September, where she lost to Lucie Šafářová.

=== 2014–15: Two major third rounds, first WTA Tour semifinal ===
At the 2014 Australian Open, Davis reached the third round of a Grand Slam tournament for the first time, but was defeated by Eugenie Bouchard.

At the 2014 Indian Wells Open, Davis defeated world No. 4, Victoria Azarenka, in the second round, marking her first victory over a top-10 player and a Grand Slam champion. She then defeated Varvara Lepchenko, but withdrew in the fourth round due to illness. At the Miami Open, she won her first-round match against Zhang Shuai, but lost in the second round to Ana Ivanovic. Following an early exit at the French Open, she advanced to the quarterfinals of the Eastbourne International, where she lost to Madison Keys.

At the 2014 Wimbledon Championships, Davis upset Flavia Pennetta in straight sets and advanced to the third round of the tournament for the first time. She ended the year ranked world No. 57.

Davis reached the semifinals of the 2015 Auckland Open, losing to Venus Williams. At the 2015 Family Circle Cup in Charleston, she avenged her loss to Eugenie Bouchard at the previous year's Australian Open and then advanced to the third round against Mona Barthel, who retired from the match while down a set. Davis exited the tournament in the quarterfinals.

=== 2016–17: Two WTA Tour finals, Fed Cup champion, top 30 ===
Davis reached her first WTA Tour final at the 2016 Washington Open, where she was runner-up against Yanina Wickmayer. She reached her second final at the Canadian 2016 Coupe Banque Nationale, losing to Océane Dodin.

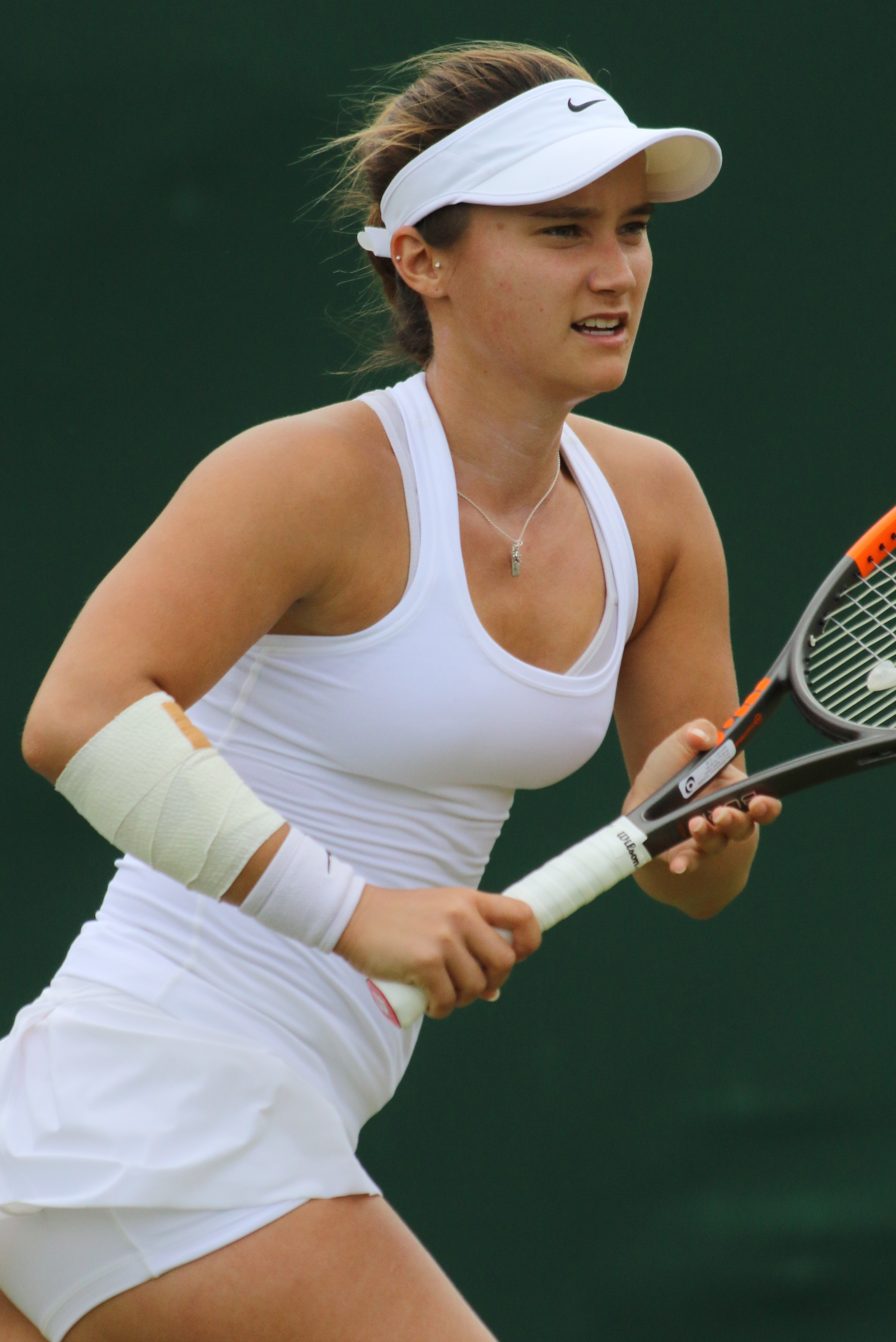
... and the 2017 Wimbledon Championships

Davis won her first WTA title at the 2017 Auckland Open, defeating eighth seed Ana Konjuh in the final. She also reached the quarterfinals of the Qatar Ladies Open in Doha as a qualifier and the Dubai Tennis Championships. As a result, she achieved a new career high of 37. Steve Tignor of Tennis.com noted, "Lauren Davis is playing the tennis of her life."

She reached the fourth round of the Indian Wells Open, equalling her result in 2014. She was also part of the United States team that reached the Fed Cup final with a victory over the Czech Republic.

Playing her first red clay-court tournament of the year, she advanced to the quarterfinals of the 2017 Morocco Open in Rabat, before dropping a three-set match to Anastasia Pavlyuchenkova. In May 2017, she reached a new career-best ranking of world No. 26. However, she lost in the first round of all four Grand Slam tournaments in 2017, including defeats to fellow Americans Varvara Lepchenko at Wimbledon and Sofia Kenin at the US Open, and by the end of the year her singles ranking had dropped to 48.

=== 2018–19: Wimbledon third round ===
Davis was unable to defend her title at the 2018 Auckland Open after losing to compatriot Sachia Vickery in the first round. Nonetheless, she put together an excellent tournament at the 2018 Australian Open, matching her career-best result at a Grand Slam event, after not winning a match at any of the four majors the previous year. In the third round, she pushed world No. 1, Simona Halep, to a nearly four-hour match, losing 13–15 in the third set and tying the tournament record for most games played in a match at 48.

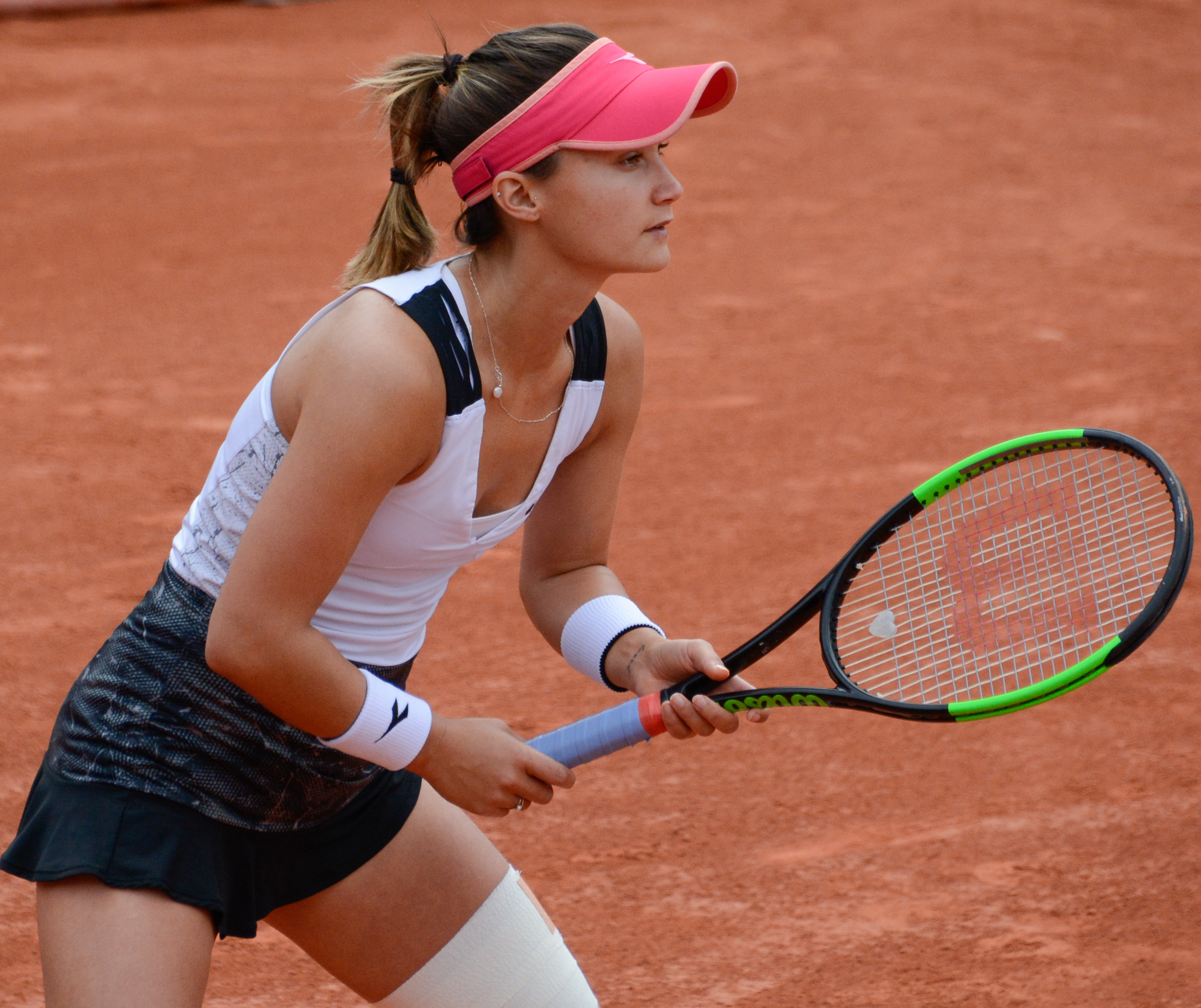
Davis at the 2019 French Open

In May 2019, Davis beat Ann Li to win the inaugural ITF FineMark Championship event at Bonita Springs. In doing so, she qualified as a wildcard for the 2019 French Open, where she beat Kristýna Plíšková, in straight sets in the first round, before losing in three sets to Johanna Konta.

At the 2019 Wimbledon Championships, Davis lost in the final round of qualifying to Kristie Ahn, but entered the main draw as a lucky loser. She beat Kateryna Kozlova in the first round in straight sets. In the second, she defeated the defending champion and fifth seed Angelique Kerber, in three sets. Davis recovered from an injury break after losing the first set and ended the match with 45 winners to Kerber's 15, winning 12 of the last 15 games to claim her first top-10 victory since 2017 and only the fourth in her career. Her run was then ended by Carla Suárez Navarro, in the third round.

Davis advanced to the quarterfinals of the 2019 Washington Open, where she lost to the eventual champion, Jessica Pegula. At the Cincinnati Open, she lost to Venus Williams in the first round. At the 2019 US Open, Davis beat Johanna Larsson in straight sets but was eliminated in the second round by Ashleigh Barty.

=== 2020–2022: US Open third round ===
In August 2021, Davis entered the main draw at the US Open, where she defeated lucky loser Viktoriya Tomova in the first round in three sets, before losing to sixth seed Bianca Andreescu.

At the 2021 Indian Wells Open, she reached also the second round defeating Nuria Parrizas-Diaz, before retiring against 22nd seed Danielle Collins.

She made the quarterfinals at the 2022 Adelaide International 2 and the third round at the 2022 Miami Open.

At the 2022 Wimbledon Championships, she defeated Madison Brengle in the first round, before exiting in three sets to Amanda Anisimova.

At the US Open, she reached the third round for the first time by defeating the 28th seed Ekaterina Alexandrova, before losing to the world No. 1, Iga Świątek.

=== 2023: Second career singles title, back to top 50 ===
Davis began her season at the Auckland Open, where she defeated Tamara Zidanšek before losing to Danka Kovinić in the second round.

She then entered the Hobart International ranked No. 84, qualifying for the main draw and recording wins over Sloane Stephens, Ysaline Bonaventure, Wang Xinyu and Anna Blinkova to reach her first WTA final since Auckland in 2017. She defeated Elisabetta Cocciaretto in the final to claim the second WTA Tour title of her career. She did not drop a set throughout the entire tournament, and became just the fourth qualifier in the tournament's history to lift the trophy. As a result, she returned to the top 60 at world No. 57 on 16 January 2023.

Davis faced Kovinić again in her opening match at the Australian Open winning in three sets, before losing to Elise Mertens in the second round. However, she rose further to No. 48 in the rankings, on 30 January 2023.

Seeded seventh at the Strasbourg Open, she defeated qualifier Sarah Iliev, Viktoriya Tomova and wildcard entrant Anastasia Pavlyuchenkova to reach the semifinals at which point she lost to Anna Blinkova.

At the French Open, Davis retired injured while trailing in her second round match against Lesia Tsurenko and was eliminated at the same stage at the US Open, losing to qualifier Kaja Juvan in three sets.

=== 2024–25: Back-to-back WTA 125 semifinals, retirement ===
Davis reached the semifinals at the WTA 125 2024 Dow Tennis Classic with wins over Alina Charaeva, Varvara Lepchenko and Whitney Osuigwe, before losing to Alycia Parks. The following week she made it to the last four at the 2024 Fifth Third Charleston 125 2, defeating Panna Udvardy, Astra Sharma and qualifier Gabriela Lee. Davis retired injured in the third set of her semifinal against top seed and eventual champion Renata Zarazúa.

Having used her protected ranking to enter, Davis won her first WTA Tour main-draw match since 2023 at the 2025 Miami Open by overcoming qualifier Aoi Ito in three sets to reach the second round, where she lost to ninth seed Zheng Qinwen.

Davis announced her retirement from tennis in November 2025.

== Playing style ==
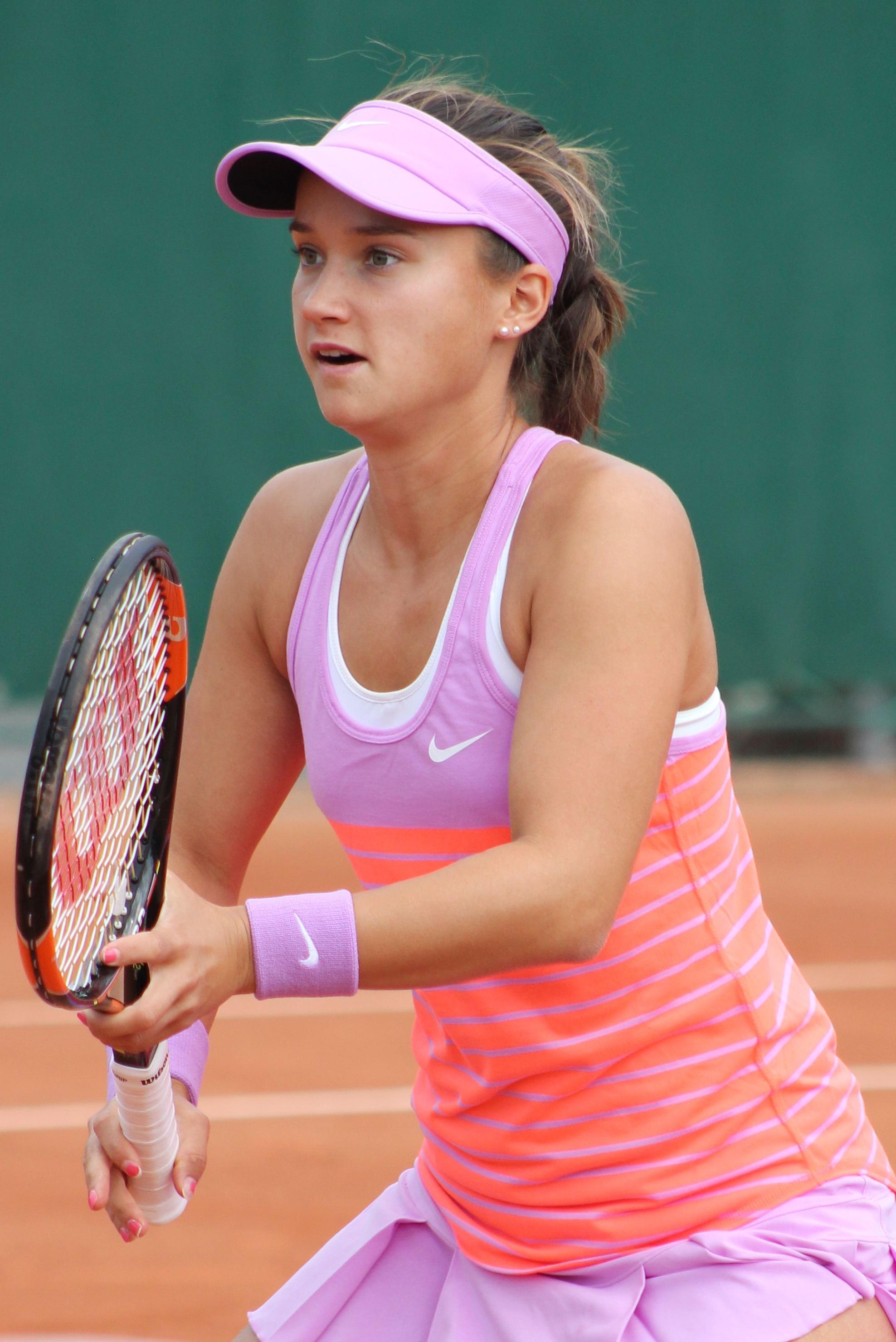
Davis at the 2015 French Open; red clay is considered one of her best surfaces

Davis is primarily known for her backhand, quickness, and clay-court abilities.

While analyzing Davis's game, Mike Whalley of the BBC labeled her backhand "a big weapon", while E.J. Crawford of US Open.org described it as "terrific", likening her style to that of Amanda Coetzer. On offense, Davis hits deep ground strokes to move opponents backward, often setting up her backhand as a finishing shot. While playing on hardcourts, she will usually draw opponents forward and attempt cross-court winners, or send serves wide and hit backhands down the line.

Davis is also noted for her backhand defense. At the 2015 Family Circle Cup, she returned a 102-mph serve from Eugenie Bouchard with a backhand winner. During their 2014 meeting, Victoria Azarenka repeatedly lost points while attacking Davis's backhand up the middle of the court—including on match point—allowing Davis to create angles. While discussing Davis in an interview, Christina McHale noted, "You don't get free points with her very often", and described her backhand as "very tough".

In a 2015 article, WTATennis.com noted Davis's "speed and court coverage", while the BBC recognized her for "whizzing round the court." Following her victory at the Auckland Open in 2017, Michael Burgess of The New Zealand Herald declared "only David Ferrer and Michael Chang are comparable to her ability to make an opponent play another shot." During Davis's final junior year, Mary Joe Fernández commended her "speed, quickness, competitiveness and heart."

Her first professional title came on clay at a USTA tournament in 2010. In contrast to some of her American peers, who have been perceived as being uncomfortable on the surface, Davis is recognized for her skill on slow courts. Following her second-round win at the 2015 Family Circle Cup, WTATennis.com labeled her performance "a clay-court masterclass". While discussing the surface, Davis noted: "I think clay really works for me, because I'm pretty fast. I can slide really well and I can make a lot of balls, so it really works for me." Davis has named hardcourt as her other favorite surface.

== Performance timelines ==
Key
W	F	SF	QF	#R	RR	Q#	P#	DNQ	A	Z#	PO	G	S	B	NMS	NTI	P	NH

(W) winner; (F) finalist; (SF) semifinalist; (QF) quarterfinalist; (#R) rounds 4, 3, 2, 1; (RR) round-robin stage; (Q#) qualification round; (P#) preliminary round; (DNQ) did not qualify; (A) absent; (Z#) Davis/Fed Cup Zonal Group (with number indication) or (PO) play-off; (G) gold, (S) silver or (B) bronze Olympic/Paralympic medal; (NMS) not a Masters tournament; (NTI) not a Tier I tournament; (P) postponed; (NH) not held; (SR) strike rate (events won / competed); (W–L) win–loss record.
To avoid confusion and double counting, these charts are updated at the conclusion of a tournament or when the player's participation has ended.

Only main-draw results in WTA Tour, Grand Slam tournaments, Fed Cup/Billie Jean King Cup and Olympic Games are included in win–loss records.

=== Singles ===
Tournament	2010	2011	2012	2013	2014	2015	2016	2017	2018	2019	2020	2021	2022	2023	2024	2025	SR	W–L	Win %
Grand Slam tournaments
Australian Open	A	1R	A	1R	3R	2R	3R	1R	3R	Q1	2R	1R	1R	2R	A	A	0 / 11	9–11	45%
French Open	A	A	2R	1R	1R	1R	1R	1R	A	2R	1R	1R	A	2R	Q2	Q1	0 / 10	3–10	23%
Wimbledon	A	A	A	1R	3R	2R	Q2	1R	Q1	3R	NH	2R	2R	1R	1R	Q1	0 / 9	7–9	44%
US Open	A	1R	Q2	1R	1R	2R	2R	1R	Q1	2R	1R	2R	3R	2R	1R	Q1	0 / 12	7–12	37%
Win–loss	0–0	0–2	1–1	0–4	4–4	3–4	3–3	0–4	2–1	4–3	1–3	2–4	3–3	3–4	0–2	0–0	0 / 42	26–42	38%
National representation
Billie Jean King Cup (Note: Formerly known as Fed Cup until 2020.)	A	A	A	A	1R	PO	A	W	A	A	A (Note: Edition is split into the two years due to COVID-19.)		A	A	A		1 / 2	0–2	0%
WTA 1000
Dubai / Qatar Open (Note: The first Premier 5 event of the year has switched back and forth between the Dubai Tennis Championships and the Qatar Ladies Open since 2009. Dubai was classified as a Premier 5 event from 2009 to 2011 before being succeeded by Doha for the 2012–2014 period. In 2015, Dubai regained its Premier 5 status while Doha was demoted to Premier status. The Premier 5 tournaments were reclassified as WTA 1000 tournaments in 2021.)	A	A	A	A	A	A	A	QF	A	A	A	A	A	2R	A	A	0 / 2	4–2	67%
Indian Wells Open	A	1R	2R	1R	4R (Note: Withdrew during the tournament. Not counted as a loss.)	2R	2R	4R	1R	2R	NH	2R	Q1	A	A	1R	0 / 11	11–10	52%
Miami Open	Q1	Q2	Q1	3R	2R	1R	Q1	1R	1R	A	NH	1R	3R	A	A	2R	0 / 8	5–8	38%
Madrid Open	A	A	A	Q1	1R	Q2	A	2R	A	A	NH	A	Q1	1R	1R		0 / 4	1–4	20%
Italian Open	A	A	A	Q2	1R	Q2	A	2R	A	A	Q1	A	2R	1R	1R		0 / 5	2–5	29%
Canadian Open	A	A	Q2	2R	1R	Q1	A	1R	A	A	NH	A	Q2	1R	A		0 / 4	1–4	20%
Cincinnati Open	A	A	Q1	2R	1R	1R	Q1	1R	Q1	1R	Q1	Q2	Q1	Q1	Q1		0 / 5	1–5	17%
Guadalajara Open	NH												1R	1R	A		0 / 2	0–2	0%
Pan Pacific / Wuhan Open (Note: In 2014, the Pan Pacific Open was downgraded to a Premier event and replaced by the Wuhan Open. The Premier 5 tournaments were reclassified as WTA 1000 tournaments in 2021.)	A	A	A	A	Q1	1R	A	2R	A	1R	NH				A		0 / 3	1–3	25%
China Open	A	A	A	2R	2R	Q2	A	1R	A	1R	NH			A	A		0 / 4	2–4	33%
Win–loss	0–0	0–1	1–1	4–5	5–6	1–4	1–1	9–9	0–2	1–4	0–0	1–2	3–3	1–5	0–2	1–2	0 / 48	28–47	37%
Career statistics
	2010	2011	2012	2013	2014	2015	2016	2017	2018	2019	2020	2021	2022	2023	2024	2025	SR	W–L	Win %
Tournaments	0	3	6	17	20	21	9	23	6	12	9	16	17	17			Career total: 176		
Titles	0	0	0	0	0	0	0	1	0	0	0	0	0	1	0		Career total: 2		
Finals	0	0	0	0	0	0	2	1	0	0	0	0	0	1	0		Career total: 4		
Hard win–loss	0–0	0–3	3–4	11–12	13–11	7–14	15–6	14–13	2–5	5–8	5–7	5–9	6–8	10–8			2 / 111	96–108	47%
Clay win–loss	0–0	0–0	1–2	1–2	2–5	3–4	0–2	4–6	0–1	2–2	0–2	3–4	4–5	4–5			0 / 38	24–40	38%
Grass win–loss	0–0	0–0	0–0	1–3	6–3	3–4	0–1	2–4	0–0	2–2	0–0	4–3	3–4	0–3			0 / 27	21–27	44%
Overall win–loss	0–0	0–3	4–6	13–17	21–19	13–22	15–9	20–23	2–6	9–12	5–9	12–16	13–17	14–16			2 / 176	141–175	45%
Win (%)	–	0%	40%	43%	53%	37%	63%	47%	25%	43%	36%	43%	43%	47%			Career total: 45%		
Year–end ranking	437	319	94	72	57	87	62	50	252	62	74	88	86	70	309		$5,093,448		

=== Doubles ===
Tournament	2011	2012	2013	2014	2015	2016	2017	2018	2019	2020	2021	2022	2023	2024	SR	W–L
Australian Open	A	A	A	1R	1R	A	2R	1R	A	2R	1R	A	A	A	0 / 6	2–6
French Open	A	A	2R	1R	1R	A	1R	A	A	2R	1R	A	A	1R	0 / 7	2–7
Wimbledon	A	A	A	1R	2R	A	1R	A	A	NH	1R	1R	2R	1R	0 / 7	2–7
US Open	1R	A	1R	2R	A	A	1R	A	1R	A	1R	A	1R	A	0 / 7	1–7
Win–loss	0–1	0–0	1–2	1–4	1–3	0–0	1–4	0–1	0–1	2–2	0–4	0–1	1–2	0–2	0 / 27	7–27

== WTA Tour finals ==
=== Singles: 4 (2 titles, 2 runner-ups) ===
Legend WTA 250 (2–2)	Finals by surface Hard (2–1) Carpet (0–1)	Finals by setting Outdoor (2–1) Indoor (0–1)

Result	W–L	Date	Tournament	Tier	Surface	Opponent	Score
Loss	0–1	Jul 2016	Washington Open, US	International (Note: The WTA International tournaments were reclassified as WTA 250 tournaments in 2021.)	Hard	(Belgium) Yanina Wickmayer	4–6, 2–6
Loss	0–2	Sep 2016	Tournoi de Québec, Canada	International	Carpet (i)	(France) Océane Dodin	4–6, 3–6
Win	1–2	Jan 2017	Auckland Open, New Zealand	International	Hard	(Croatia) Ana Konjuh	6–3, 6–1
Win	2–2	Jan 2023	Hobart International, Australia	WTA 250	Hard	(Italy) Elisabetta Cocciaretto	7–6^{(7–0)}, 6–2

== WTA Challenger finals ==
=== Singles: 1 (runner-up) ===
Result	W–L	Date	Tournament	Surface	Opponent	Score
Loss	0–1	Nov 2018	Houston Challenger, United States	Hard	(China) Peng Shuai	6–1, 5–7, 4–6

== ITF Circuit finals ==
=== Singles: 13 (8 titles, 5 runner-ups) ===
Legend $100,000 tournaments (2–1) $75/80,000 tournaments (0–2) $50,000 tournaments (1–0) $25,000 tournaments (2–1) $10,000 tournaments (3–1)	Finals by surface Hard (4–3) Clay (4–2)

Result	W–L	Date	Tournament	Tier	Surface	Opponent	Score
Loss	0–1	Jun 2010	ITF Mount Pleasant, United States	10,000	Clay	(Slovenia) Petra Rampre	3–6, 2–6
Win	1–1	Oct 2010	ITF Williamsburg, United States	10,000	Clay	(Latvia) Līga Dekmeijere	6–0, 6–0
Win	2–1	Oct 2010	ITF Bayamón, Puerto Rico	25,000	Hard	(United States) Madison Keys	7–6^{(5)}, 6–4
Win	3–1	Jun 2011	ITF Buffalo, United States	10,000	Clay	(United States) Nicole Gibbs	5–7, 6–2, 6–4
Win	4–1	Jul 2011	ITF Atlanta, United States	10,000	Hard	(United States) Alexis King	1–6, 6–2, 6–2
Win	5–1	Jan 2012	ITF Plantation, United States	25,000	Clay	(United States) Gail Brodsky	6–4, 6–1
Loss	5–2	Jan 2012	Rancho Santa Fe Open, US	25,000	Hard	(United States) Julia Boserup	0–6, 3–6
Loss	5–3	Sep 2012	Albuquerque Open, US	75,000	Hard	(United States) Maria Sanchez	1–6, 1–6
Win	6–3	Sep 2012	Las Vegas Open, United States	50,000	Hard	(United States) Shelby Rogers	6–7^{(5)}, 6–2, 6–2
Win	7–3	Feb 2013	Midland Tennis Classic, US	100,000	Hard (i)	(Croatia) Ajla Tomljanović	6–3, 2–6, 7–6^{(2)}
Loss	7–4	Oct 2016	Internationaux de Poitiers, France	100,000	Hard (i)	(France) Océane Dodin	4–6, 2–6
Loss	7–5	Apr 2019	Dothan Pro Classic, US	80,000	Clay	(Slovakia) Kristína Kučová	6–3, 6–7^{(9)}, 2–6
Win	8–5	May 2019	Bonita Springs Championship, US	100,000	Clay	(United States) Ann Li	7–5, 7–5

== Fed Cup performance ==
=== Singles (0–2) ===
Edition	Round	Date	Location	Surface	Against	Opponent	W–L	Result
2015	WG PO	18 Apr 2015	Brindisi (ITA)	Clay	Italy	Sara Errani	L	1–6, 2–6
2017	WG SF	23 Apr 2017	Tampa (USA)	Clay	Czech Republic	Markéta Vondroušová	L	2–6, 5–7

=== Doubles (1–0) ===
Edition	Round	Date	Location	Surface	Partnering	Against	Opponents	W–L	Result
2014	WG QF	9 Feb 2014	Cleveland (USA)	Hard (i)	Madison Keys	Italy	Nastassja Burnett; Alice Matteucci	W	6–2, 6–3

== WTA Tour career earnings ==
as of December 2021

Year	Grand Slam titles	WTA titles	Total titles	Earnings ($)	Money list rank
2013	0	0	0	273,966	97
2014	0	0	0	474,760	57
2015	0	0	0	371,260	81
2016	0	0	0	307,694	101
2017	0	1	1	574,662	58
2018	0	0	0	192,431	164
2019	0	0	0	505,849	83
2020	0	0	0	273,983	93
2021	0	0	0	486,174	85
Career	0	1	1	3,646,182	165

== Head-to-head records ==
=== Record against top ten players ===
Davis's record against players who have been ranked in the top 10. Active players are in boldface.

**Player**	**Record**	**W%**	**Hard**	**Clay**	**Grass**	**Carpet**	**Last match**
**Number 1 ranked players**							
**(Germany) Angelique Kerber**	1–1	50%	0–1	–	1–0	–	Won (2–6, 6–2, 6–1) at 2019 Wimbledon
**(Belarus) Victoria Azarenka**	1–2	33%	1–2	–	–	–	Lost (2–6, 6–7^{(4–7)}) at 2015 Wuhan
(Australia) Ashleigh Barty	0–1	0%	0–1	–	–	–	Lost (2–6, 6–7^{(2–7)}) at 2019 US Open
**(Japan) Naomi Osaka**	0–1	0%	–	–	0–1	–	Lost (1–6, 6–2, 6–7^{(4–7)}) at 2017 Birmingham
**(Czech Republic) Karolína Plíšková**	0–1	0%	–	0–1	–	–	Lost (1–6, 1–6) at 2017 Rome
(Russia) Maria Sharapova	0–1	0%	0–1	–	–	–	Lost (1–6, 7–6^{(7–5)}, 0–6) at 2016 Australian Open
**(Poland) Iga Świątek**	0–1	0%	0–1	–	–	–	Lost (3–6, 4–6) at 2022 US Open
**(Romania) Simona Halep**	0–2	0%	0–2	–	–	–	Lost (6–4, 4–6, 13–15) at 2018 Australian Open
(Serbia) Ana Ivanovic	0–2	0%	0–1	–	0–1	–	Lost (1–6, 1–6) at 2014 Birmingham
(Serbia) Jelena Janković	0–2	0%	0–1	0–1	–	–	Lost (7–6^{(7–5)}, 0–6, 4–6) at 2015 Indian Wells
**(Spain) Garbiñe Muguruza**	0–2	0%	0–1	–	0–1	–	Lost (1–6, 3–6) at 2019 Indian Wells
(Denmark) Caroline Wozniacki	0–3	0%	0–3	–	–	–	Lost (1–6, 6–4, 4–6) at 2020 Auckland
**(United States) Venus Williams**	0–4	0%	0–4	–	–	–	Lost (5–7, 2–6) at 2019 Cincinnati
Number 2 ranked players							
**(Russia) Svetlana Kuznetsova**	1–0	100%	1–0	–	–	–	Won (3–6, 7–5, 7–5) at 2013 Toronto
(Poland) Agnieszka Radwańska	1–1	50%	–	–	1–1	–	Won (7–6^{(7–1)}, 6–1) at 2017 Eastbourne
**(Spain) Paula Badosa**	0–1	0%	–	0–1	–	–	Lost (2–6, 6–7^{(3–7)}) at 2021 French Open
**(Czech Republic) Barbora Krejčíková**	0–1	0%	0–1	–	–	–	Lost (4–6, 6–4, 4–6) at 2021 Melbourne 3
(China) Li Na	0–1	0%	0–1	–	–	–	Lost (6–4, 1–6, 1–6) at 2013 Cincinnati
(Estonia) Anett Kontaveit	0–2	0%	0–1	–	0–1	–	Lost (6–1, 0–6, 0–6) at 2021 Cleveland
**(Czech Republic) Petra Kvitová**	0–2	0%	0–2	–	–	–	Lost (5–7, 1–6) at 2022 Miami
**(Belarus) Aryna Sabalenka**	0–2	0%	0–2	–	–	–	Lost (0–6, 1–6) at 2023 Dubai
Number 3 ranked players							
**(United States) Sloane Stephens**	4–3	57%	4–2	–	0–1	–	Lost (6–1, 3–6, 1–6) at 2023 Cleveland
**(United States) Jessica Pegula**	2–4	33%	2–3	–	0–1	–	Lost (2–6, 7–6^{(8–6)}, 3–6) at 2023 Wimbledon
**(United States) Cori Gauff**	0–1	0%	–	0–1	–	–	Lost (2–6, 6–7^{(2–7)}) at 2021 Charleston
(Russia) Nadia Petrova	0–1	0%	0–1	–	–	–	Lost (3–6, 2–6) at 2012 Indian Wells
**(Kazakhstan) Elena Rybakina**	0–1	0%	–	0–1	–	–	Lost (4–6, 3–6) at 2022 Rome
**(Greece) Maria Sakkari**	0–1	0%	–	0–1	–	–	Lost (5–7, 4–6) at 2017 Charleston
**(Ukraine) Elina Svitolina**	0–5	0%	0–5	–	–	–	Lost (2–6, 6–7^{(6–8)}) at 2020 Australian Open
Number 4 ranked players							
**(United States) Sofia Kenin**	2–1	67%	1–1	1–0	–	–	Won (4–6, 6–3, 6–4) at 2021 Charleston
(Netherlands) Kiki Bertens	1–1	50%	1–1	–	–	–	Won (7–6^{(7–3)}, 6–4) at 2017 Auckland
(United Kingdom) Johanna Konta	1–3	25%	0–2	1–1	–	–	Lost (3–6, 6–1, 3–6) at 2019 French Open
**(Canada) Bianca Andreescu**	0–1	0%	0–1	–	–	–	Lost (4–6, 4–6) at 2021 US Open
(Italy) Francesca Schiavone	0–1	0%	–	0–1	–	–	Lost (4–6, 1–6) at 2017 Strasbourg
**(France) Caroline Garcia**	0–2	0%	0–1	–	0–1	–	Lost (3–6, 6–7^{(3–7)}) at 2022 Nottingham
**(Switzerland) Belinda Bencic**	0–3	0%	0–3	–	–	–	Lost (1–6, 4–6) at 2023 Washington
(Australia) Samantha Stosur	0–4	0%	0–3	0–1	–	–	Lost (6–3, 3–6, 3–6) at 2018 Indian Wells
Number 5 ranked players							
**(Canada) Eugenie Bouchard**	2–2	50%	1–2	1–0	–	–	Won (6–1, 6–2) at 2019 Washington
**(Italy) Sara Errani**	2–3	40%	0–2	1–1	1–0	–	Won (7–5, 7–5) at 2022 Parma
**(Latvia) Jeļena Ostapenko**	2–3	40%	1–1	1–1	0–1	–	Lost (1–6, 3–6) at 2022 Guadalajara
(Slovakia) Daniela Hantuchová	1–2	33%	0–2	–	1–0	–	Lost (6–4, 6–7^{(6–8)}, 2–6) at 2016 Linz
(Czech Republic) Lucie Šafářová	0–2	0%	–	–	0–1	0–1	Lost (2–6, 4–6) at 2013 Quebec
Number 6 ranked players							
(Italy) Flavia Pennetta	1–0	100%	–	–	1–0	–	Won (6–4, 7–6^{(7–4)}) at 2014 Wimbledon
(Spain) Carla Suárez Navarro	1–3	25%	0–2	1–0	0–1	–	Lost (3–6, 3–6) at 2019 Wimbledon
**(Czech Republic) Markéta Vondroušová**	0–1	0%	–	0–1	–	–	Lost (2–6, 5–7) at 2017 Fed Cup
Number 7 ranked players							
(Italy) Roberta Vinci	1–0	100%	1–0	–	–	–	Won (6–2, 6–3) at 2017 Doha
**(United States) Madison Keys**	2–5	29%	2–1	0–1	0–3	–	Lost (4–6, 3–6) at 2022 Eastbourne
(France) Marion Bartoli	0–1	0%	0–1	–	–	–	Lost (0–6, 3–6) at 2013 Toronto
**(United States) Danielle Collins**	0–1	0%	0–1	–	–	–	Lost (1–6, ret.) at 2021 Indian Wells
Number 8 ranked players							
(Russia) Ekaterina Makarova	1–3	25%	1–3	–	–	–	Lost (2–6, 4–6) at 2017 Wuhan
Number 9 ranked players							
(Germany) Andrea Petkovic	3–0	100%	3–0	–	–	–	Won (4–6, 6–0, 6–0) at 2018 Australian Open
(Germany) Julia Görges	2–1	67%	2–0	0–1	–	–	Won (6–1, 6–4) at 2017 Indian Wells
(United States) CoCo Vandeweghe	2–1	67%	1–0	1–1	–	–	Lost (6–3, 3–6, 3–6) at 2022 Charleston
Number 10 ranked players							
**(Brazil) Beatriz Haddad Maia**	0–2	0%	0–2	–	–	–	Lost (3–6, 3–6) at 2019 Australian Open Q.
**(France) Kristina Mladenovic**	0–3	0%	0–1	0–2	–	–	Lost (3–6, 6–1, 6–7^{(1–7)}) at 2017 Madrid
**Total**	**34–96**	**26%**	**22–64 (26%)**	**7–17 (29%)**	**5–14 (26%)**	**0–1 (0%)**	**current after 2023 Cleveland**

== Top 10 wins ==
#	Player	Rank	Event	Surface	Rd	Score	LDR
2014
1.	(Belarus) Victoria Azarenka	No. 4	Indian Wells Open, United States	Hard	2R	6–0, 7–6^{(7–2)}	No. 66
2015
2.	(Canada) Eugenie Bouchard	No. 7	Charleston Open, United States	Clay	2R	6–3, 6–1	No. 66
2017
3.	(Poland) Agnieszka Radwańska	No. 10	Eastbourne International, UK	Grass	2R	7–6^{(7–1)}, 6–1	No. 29
2019
4.	(Germany) Angelique Kerber	No. 5	Wimbledon, United Kingdom	Grass	2R	2–6, 6–2, 6–1	No. 95
2021
5.	(United States) Sofia Kenin	No. 4	Charleston Open, United States	Clay	3R	4–6, 6–3, 6–4	No. 79

== Notes ==
Sporting positions
Preceded by (Canada) Gabriela Dabrowski	Orange Bowl Girls' Singles Champion; Category: 18 and under 2010	Succeeded by (Estonia) Anett Kontaveit
