= Hafez Nazeri =

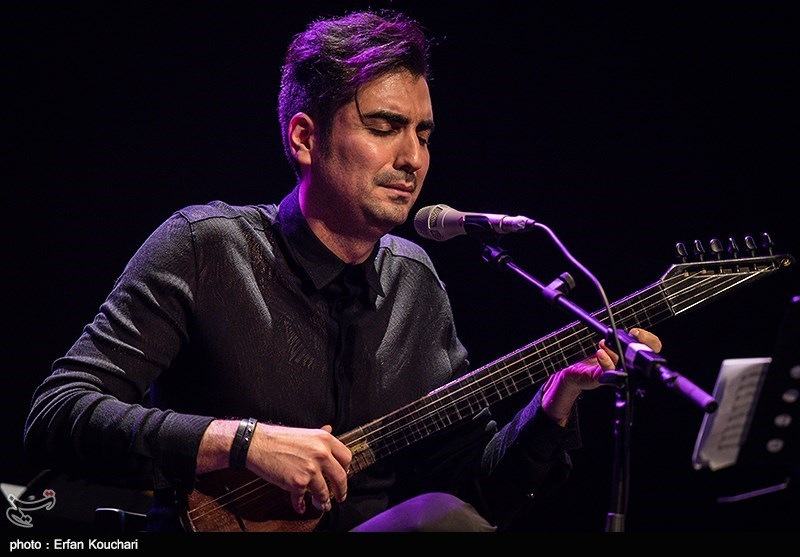
- Born: 30 July 1979 (age 47); Tehran, Iran
- Occupations: Singer; Composer; Conductor
- Musical career
- Genres: Persian traditional music; dastgah
- Instruments: Vocals; Setar; Tanbour; Daf
- Years active: 1998–present
- Label
- Website: www.hafeznazeri.com

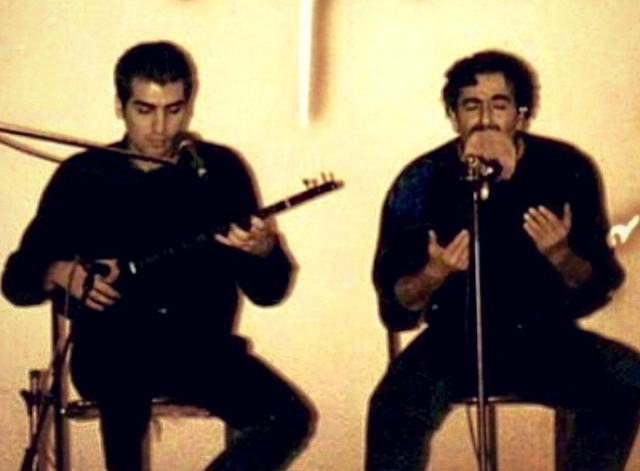
Hafez Nazeri & Shahram Nazeri, 2001

Hafez Nazeri (Persian: حافظ ناظری, Kurdish: حافز نازری, Hafiz Nazirî) is a Kurdish Iranian singer and composer. He is the son of Kurdish Iranian musician Shahram Nazeri.

== Move to North America ==
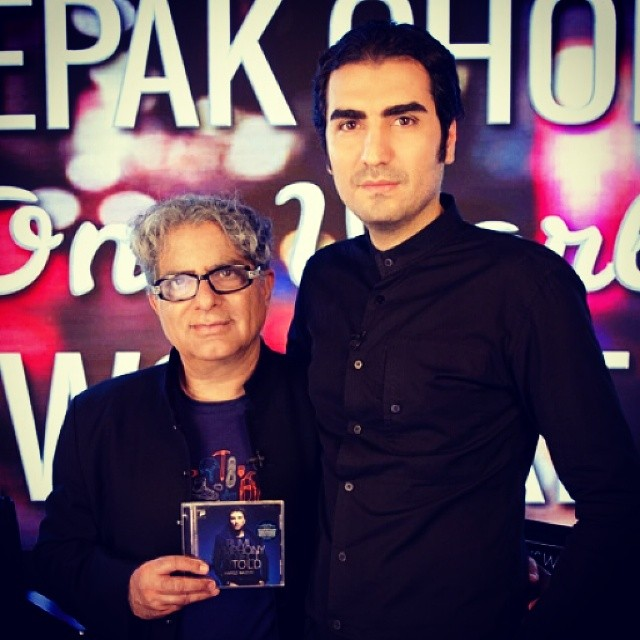
Hafez Nazeri and Deepak Chopra

The venues of Hafez's performances in North America included Los Angeles’ Kodak Theatre – the most highly attended Persian classical music concert outside of Iran – the Atlanta Symphony Hall and traveled to San Francisco, Washington, D.C., and Boston. Hafez's international appeal led to several invitations to speak at various media outlets, including radio stations such as KPBS, KPFK, KPFA, UC Berkeley Radio and NPR in the United States.

Broadcast interviews include a 9-minute on CNN’s Live From with Kyra Phillips (29 March 2006), BBC World Service's program, The Ticket with Mark Coles (4/26/06), a live appearance on the Fox Channel (10 March 2006), and an exclusive on ABC News, following a recent New York City performance.

In 2007, the Rumi Symphony Project culminated in a major work to celebrate the 800th anniversary of Rumi's birth. Deepak Chopra translated Rumi's poems for Nazeri's recording and wrote an introduction to the work. The project was premiered in Los Angeles where it received nine standing ovations.

== Rumi Symphony Project: Untold ==
In March 2014, Nazeri released Rumi Symphony Project: Untold, a chart-topping album featuring 42 Grammy Award-winning musicians. The result of over 5000 hours of recording studio work, Untold is an attempt to represent the splendor of all creation. Nazeri was inspired by the improvisatory tradition of his native Iran and Western classical music’s rich harmonic structures.

In the words of the composer, "Untold is the first cycle of my Rumi Symphony Project and portrays the story of our universe from the dawn of time until the very end, through my eyes. It is composed of four distinct chapters that represent the cycles of our existence, and our journey through the seven stages of enlightenment.

== The Hafez (musical instrument) ==
Featured throughout Untold is the Hafez, an instrument designed by Nazeri himself, which is a contemporary variation on the traditional Setar (Iranian long-necked lute). By adding two lower-pitched strings, Nazeri enriched the sound of the instrument (traditionally played in a monophonic fashion), allowing it to play both harmonic and melodic roles within its extended range.

== Released works ==
- Rumi Symphony Project: Untold (2014), Cycle 1, with Shahram Nazeri and the Rumi Ensemble. Recorded in four countries with over 35 Grammy Award winning artists and Deepak Chopra.
- The Passion of Rumi (2008), with Shahram Nazeri and Rumi Ensemble, Live recording from Tehran 2000.
- Mythical Chant 2004, also called Naghmeha-ye Sassani (meaning Songs from Sassanid era,) with Shahram Nazeri and Feyz Bashipour. He has just played the Dohol (an Iranian folk percussion) and the Daf in this album.
- 98's Concert 1998, with Shahram Nazeri and Kamkars Ensemble, the anniversary of Hafez' Birthday, live from Shiraz. He has just played the Setar in this album.
- Mystified 90's, with Shahram Nazeri and Kaykhosro Pournazeri (Shams Ensemble). He has just played the Daf in this album.

== Controversial Sidelines of Hafez Nazeri's Activities ==
After the release of Hafez Nazeri's first album and the publication of his claims regarding his musical activities and education in the U.S., Sadjad Pourghanad was the first person to criticize him in HarmonyTalk journal. With the publication of Hafez Nazeri's second album, Hooshang Kamkar, his former music professor, published a disclosed letter in which he had severely criticized Hafez' composition and his propaganda for his work in Shargh Newspaper.

Thought he had scheduled a live presentation of Untold in Iran for September 2014, the concert had to be cancelled due to foreign players being denied the necessary visa to enter the country.

== Gallery ==
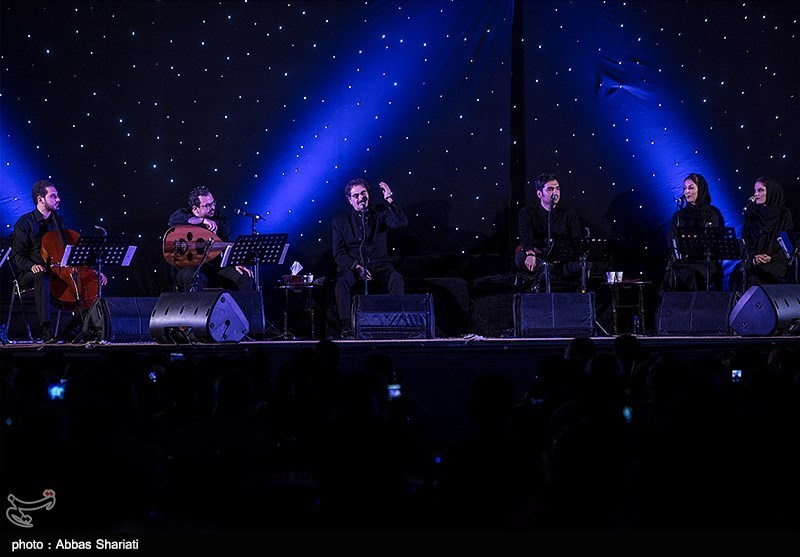
Hafez Nazeri & Shahram Nazeri, Untold Concert

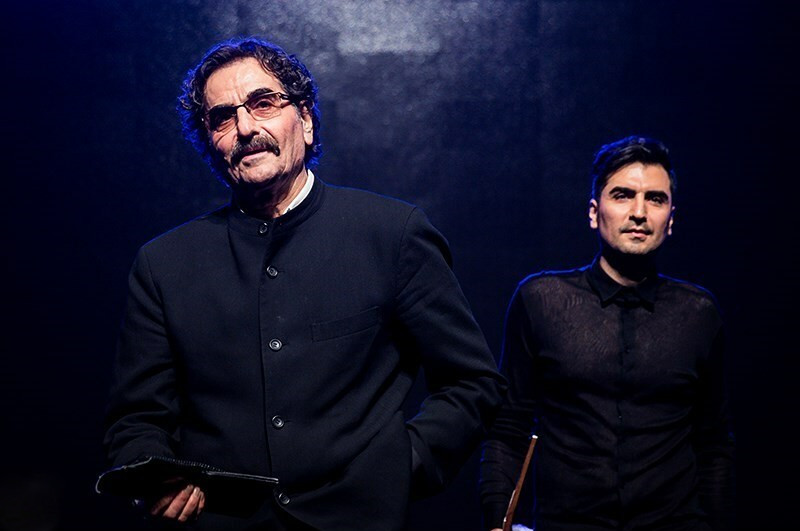
Hafez & Shahram Nazeri, 2017 Concert in Iran

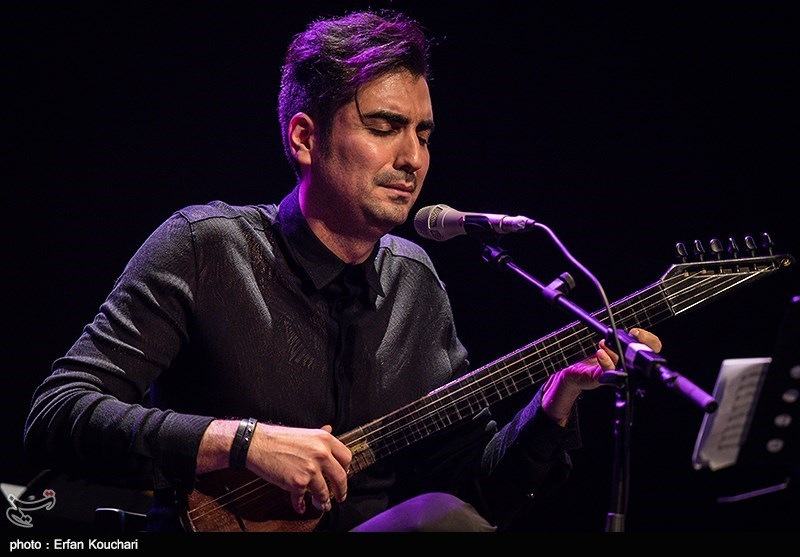
Hafez Nazeri Live in Tehran

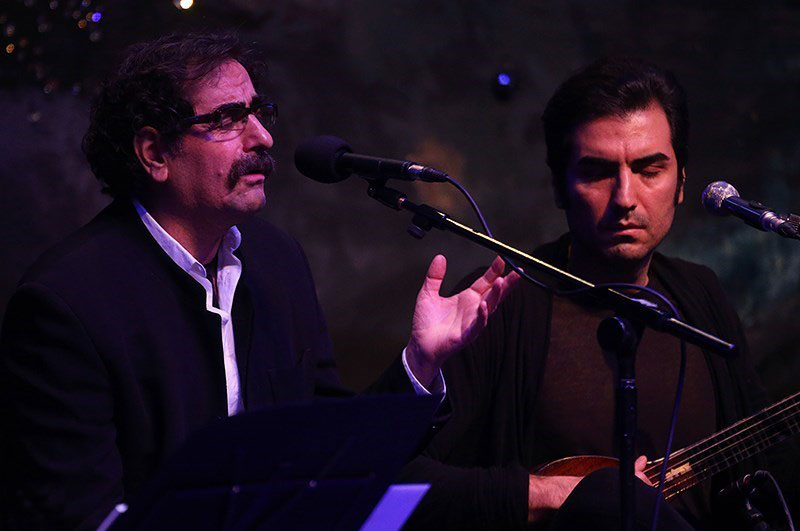
Hafez Nazeri Playing with Shahram Nazeri

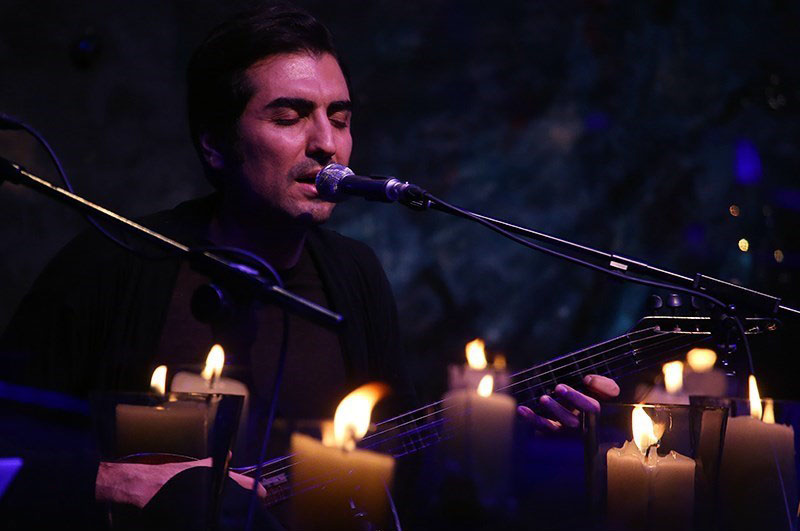
Hafez Nazeri Playing The Hafez (a modification to The Setar)

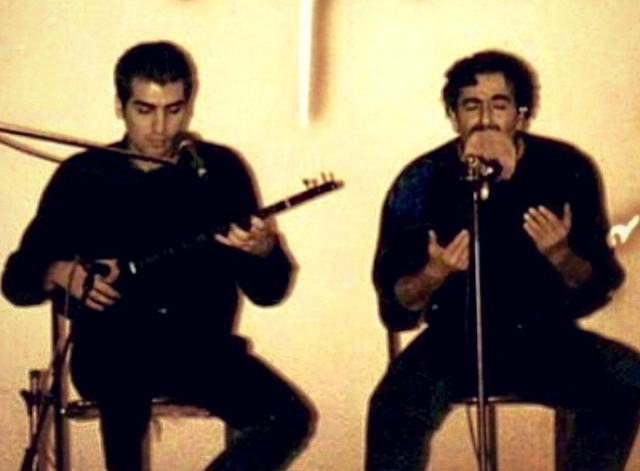
Shahram Nazeri & Hafez Nazeri, 2001

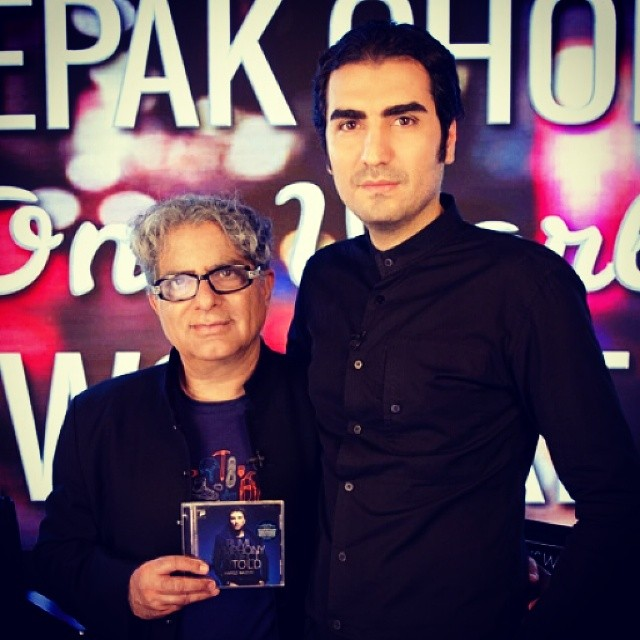
Hafez Nazeri & Deepak Chopra
