= Villacis =

Villacís or Villacis is a Hispanic surname. Notable people with the surname include:

- Eduardo Villacis (born 1979), Major League Baseball pitcher
- Begoña Villacís (born 1977), Spanish politician
- Roberto de Villacis (born 1967), Ecuadorian American fashion designer
- Aníbal Villacís (1927–2012), Ecuadorian painter
- Belisario Villacís (1899–?), Ecuadorian long-distance runner
