= George Patton IV =

United States Army general (1923–2004) and son of George Patton

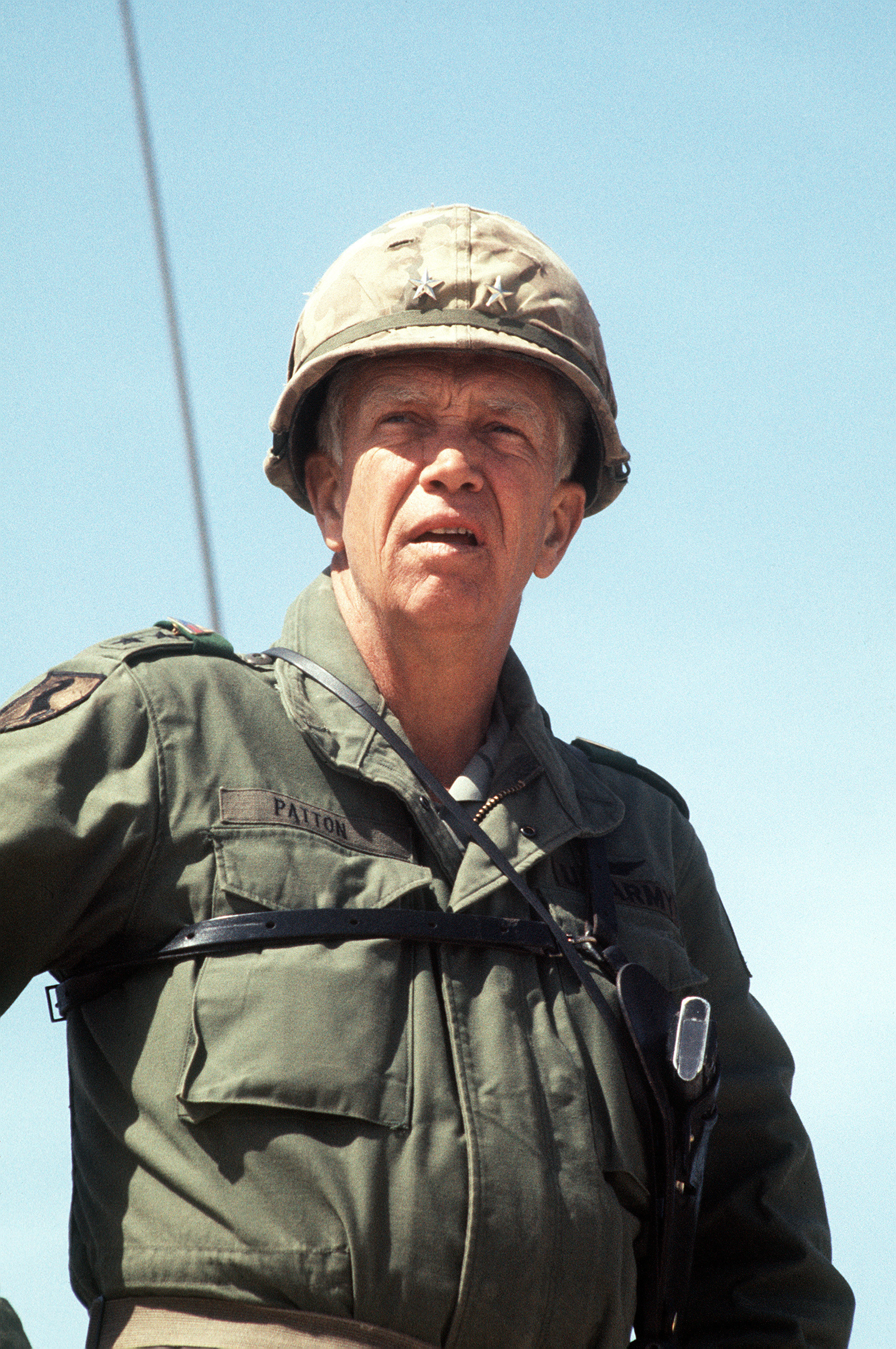
- Patton in 1977
- Born: George Smith Patton IV; December 24, 1923; Boston, Massachusetts, U.S.
- Died: June 27, 2004 (aged 80); South Hamilton, Massachusetts, U.S.
- Burial place: Arlington National Cemetery
- Spouse: Joanne Holbrook (m. 1952)
- Children: 3, including Benjamin Patton
- Relatives: George S. Patton (father); George Smith Patton (grandfather); Frederick Ayer (grandfather); Louise Ayer Hatheway (aunt); Mark Gordon (first cousin once removed)
- Military career
- Allegiance: United States
- Branch: United States Army
- Service years: 1942–1980
- Rank: Major General
- Commands: 2nd Armored Division; 11th Armored Cavalry Regiment; 2nd Medium Tank Battalion
- Conflicts: Korean War; Vietnam War; Tet Offensive
- Awards: Distinguished Service Cross (2); Silver Star (2); Legion of Merit (3); Distinguished Flying Cross; Bronze Star Medal (2); Purple Heart
- Other work: Farmer; The Fighting Pattons (co-author)

George Smith Patton IV (December 24, 1923 – June 27, 2004) was a major general in the United States Army and the son of World War II General George S. Patton Jr. He served in the Korean War and the Vietnam War.

== Career ==
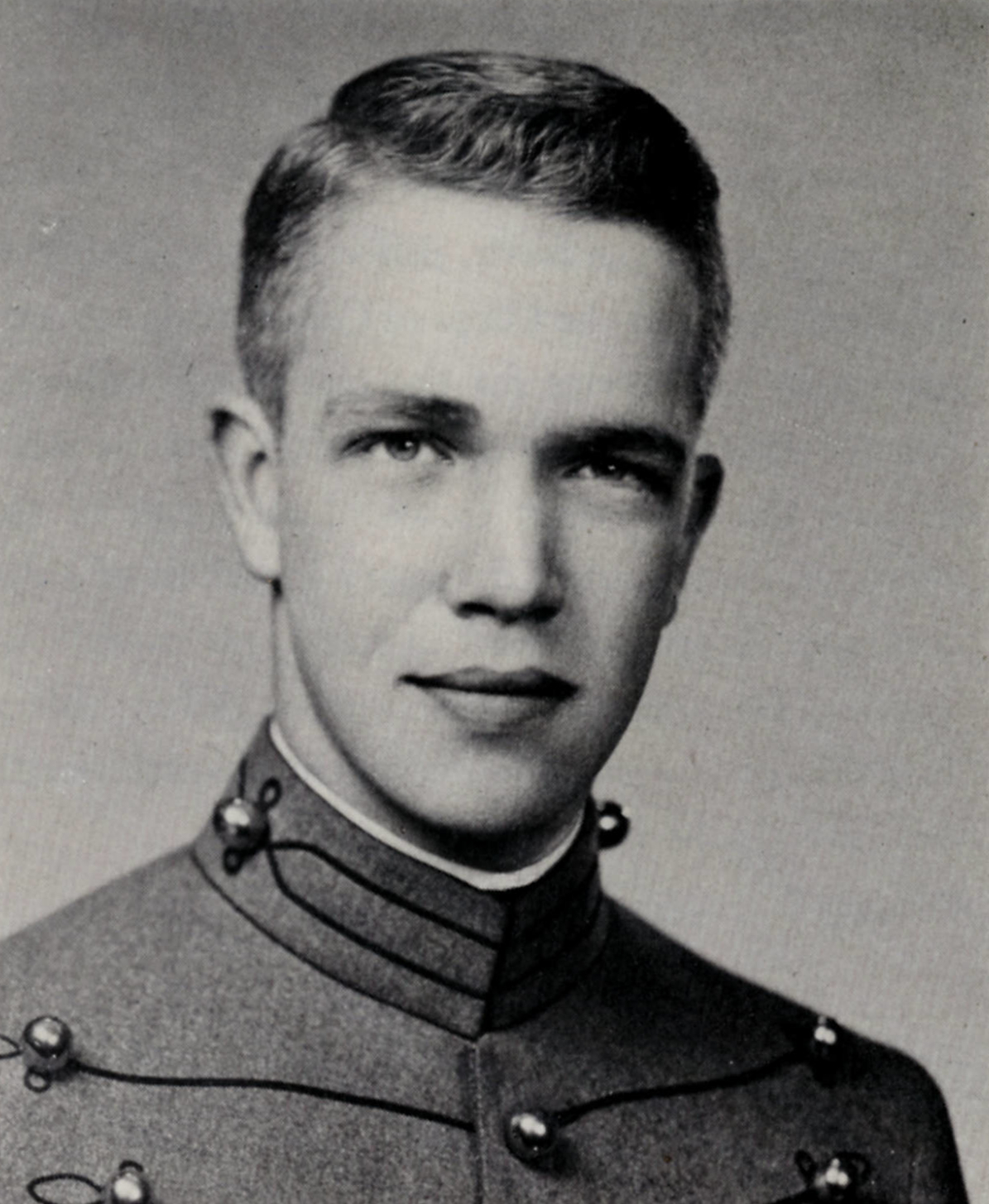
Patton as a United States Military Academy cadet c. 1946

Patton was educated at The Hill School. Patton entered West Point in 1942 and graduated four years later in 1946 as an infantry officer. While serving at West Point, his father died, and the younger Patton dropped the Roman numeral from his name. Technically the fourth 'George Smith Patton', he is sometimes remembered as 'George Patton III' as his father was called Patton Jr.

His first assignment was to Regensburg, West Germany, where he participated in the 1948 Berlin Airlift. The troops under his command were used to load supplies onto Air Force transport aircraft bound for Berlin. In 1952, he joined C Company, 63rd Tank Battalion, 1st Infantry Division, as a platoon leader. A year after he returned from Germany, he married Joanne Holbrook in 1952.

=== Korean War ===
Patton served in the Korean War from February 1953, commanding "A" Company of the 140th Tank Battalion, 40th Infantry Division. He received his first Silver Star and the Purple Heart in Korea.

Returning to the United States in 1954, Patton, now a captain, was initially assigned to West Point, but was quickly picked up as part of an exchange program and was sent to teach at the United States Naval Academy.

=== Vietnam War ===
Patton served a total of three tours of duty in South Vietnam, the first from April 1962 to April 1963 at Military Assistance Command, Vietnam, during which he was promoted to lieutenant colonel. He then took command of the 2nd Battalion, 81st Armor of the 1st Armored Division at Fort Hood Texas, before his second tour in 1967, this one lasting only three months. During Patton's final and most intense tour, lasting from January 1968 to January 1969, he was awarded two Distinguished Service Crosses for his actions on the battlefield. During this final tour, he was initially assigned as Chief of Operations and Plans at Headquarters, United States Army Vietnam. However, after his promotion to colonel in April 1968, he was given command of the 11th Armored Cavalry Regiment, which he led from July 1968 to April 1969. During his three tours in Vietnam, Patton, who frequently used helicopters as a mobile command post, was shot down three times and was awarded the Distinguished Flying Cross and a second Silver Star.

=== Post-war ===
After Vietnam, Patton was promoted to brigadier general in June 1970 before becoming the commanding general of the 2nd Armored Division, in 1975, as a major general. This was a unit his father had commanded just before the United States had entered World War II, making this the first time in United States Army history that a father and a son had both commanded the same division.

Brigadier General Patton was deputy post commander at Fort Knox, Kentucky, during 1972. He was also assistant commandant of the Armor School at the same time.

Patton was assigned to the VII Corps in Germany, as the deputy commander. He was stationed near Stuttgart, where Manfred Rommel, son of Field Marshal Erwin Rommel, was a government official who later became the city's mayor. The sons of the two former adversaries entered a much publicized friendship, which continued until Patton's death in 2004. From 5 August 1975 to 3 November 1977, he commanded the 2nd Armored Division at Fort Hood, Texas.

== Later life and death ==
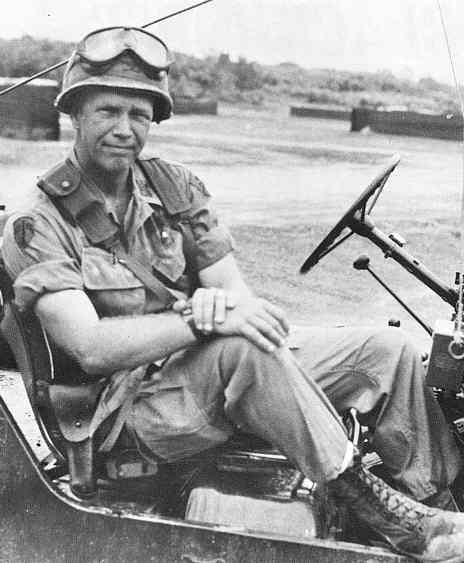
Patton as a colonel in South Vietnam

In the years after his retirement in 1980, Patton turned an estate owned by his father located in Essex County, Massachusetts, into the Green Meadows Farm, where he named the fields after soldiers who died under his command in Vietnam.

Patton befriended the mayor of Stuttgart, Manfred Rommel, the son of his father's wartime opposing general Erwin Rommel. The two remained friends after Patton's retirement from the armed forces.

During the first years after his retirement from the Army, Patton was interviewed by journalist Kim Willenson for his book The Bad War: An Oral History of the Vietnam War, which was published in June 1987. In the 1990s, Patton worked alongside author Brian Sobel to write The Fighting Pattons, a book that serves as an official family biography of his father as well as a comparison between the military of his father's generation and that of his own, a time which covered five conflicts and almost 70 years of combined service. The Fighting Pattons was published in 1997.

Patton originally intended to write his memoirs after retirement from the U.S. Army, but a fire at his home destroyed numerous irreplaceable files and papers. His son, Benjamin Patton, detailed this in his book Growing Up Patton.

He died from a form of Parkinson's disease at the age of 80 in 2004.

== Personal life ==
Patton was the fourth in his line to be named George Smith Patton. His great-grandfather, the first George Smith Patton, was a colonel in the Confederate army during the American Civil War. Commanding a brigade at the Battle of Opequon, also known as the Third Battle of Winchester on September 19, 1864, he was wounded, captured and died. True to what would be a Patton family characteristic of never admitting defeat, Patton was mortally wounded in a nearly hopeless attempt to rally his men after his brigade had been shot to pieces and all his subordinate regiments' colors had been captured. Patton's grandfather, born George William Patton in 1856, changed his name to George Smith Patton in 1868, in honor of his father. Patton's father was George Smith Patton Jr., the renowned World War II general most famous for his command of the Third U.S. Army in Northwest Europe in 1944 and 1945.

Though given the name Junior, Patton's father was actually the third George Smith Patton. For this reason, Patton was christened George Smith Patton IV. Following his father's death in 1945, Patton changed his legal name to George Smith Patton, dropping the Roman numerals.

His eldest son, technically the fifth George S. Patton, is also known as George Smith Patton Jr. The World War II General Patton's youngest grandson, who still is living, has given interviews on the History Channel and the Military Channel, recalling his family heritage.

Another son, Robert H. Patton, has written a history of the Patton family: The Pattons: A Personal History of an American Family (Crown, 1994).

His youngest son Benjamin Patton has written a family biography entitled Growing Up Patton: Reflections on Heroes, History, and Family Wisdom, which reflected on his grandfather and father's careers. Benjamin, a filmmaker, also recorded tapes of his father's memories of his own and his grandfather's experiences, and those tapes formed the basis of the book The Fighting Pattons by Brian M. Sobel.

== Awards and decorations ==
Patton's military awards include:

Badges

Basic Army Aircrew Badge
Parachutist Badge

Decorations

Distinguished Service Cross with bronze oak leaf cluster
Silver Star with bronze oak leaf cluster
Legion of Merit with two bronze oak leaf clusters
Distinguished Flying Cross
Bronze Star Medal with "V" Device and bronze oak leaf cluster
Purple Heart
Meritorious Service Medal
Air Medal with award numeral 27
Army Commendation Medal with three bronze oak leaf clusters

Unit Award

Army Presidential Unit Citation

Service Medals

American Campaign Medal
World War II Victory Medal
Army of Occupation Medal with 'Germany' clasp
National Defense Service Medal with bronze service star
Korean Service Medal with two bronze campaign stars
Vietnam Service Medal with silver and two bronze stars

Foreign Awards

Republic of Vietnam Army Distinguished Service Order (2nd Class)
Republic of Vietnam Gallantry Cross with Silver and two Bronze Stars
Republic of Vietnam Armed Forces Honor Medal, 1st Class
Republic of Korea Presidential Unit Citation
Republic of Vietnam Gallantry Cross Unit Citation
United Nations Korea Medal
Republic of Vietnam Campaign Medal
Republic of Korea War Service Medal

== In popular culture ==
Robert Duvall partially based his performance of Lieutenant Colonel William "Bill" Kilgore from the film Apocalypse Now on George S. Patton IV.
