= Ala'a Basatneh =

Syrian American activist (born 1992)

Alaa Basatneh
- Born: March 24, 1992 (age 34); Damascus, Syria
- Citizenship: American
- Occupation: Activist
- Known for: Political activism

Ala'a Basatneh, born in Damascus, Syria, is a Syrian-American political activist best known for her involvement in the Syrian Revolution. She is the focus of the 2013 documentary called #ChicagoGirl: The Social Network Takes on a Dictator. In 2016, she attended President Obama's last State of the Union address, as a guest of Illinois Democratic Representative Mike Quigley.

== Biography ==
According to the documentary she was the protagonist of, #ChicagoGirl, Basatneh was born in Damascus, Syria and emigrated to the United States with her family when she was six months old. She lived in Chicago, Illinois, before moving to Miami, Florida.

Basatneh graduated from Wright College and Northeastern Illinois University with a political science degree. She is a writer at Fusion, focusing mostly on politics and the Arab world.

== Political activism ==
Basatneh became an online political activist in 2011, after news reports regarding the arrest of 15 young students in Daraa. She organized her first protest in Chicago, demanding the end of the martial law in Syria. Later, using Facebook, she coordinated rallies in Syria, helping anti-regime activists on the ground, as well as distributing the digital footage to various media outlets. She also personally visited Syria to deliver medical supplies.

She has met with Hillary Clinton at the United Nations, during Clinton's tenure as Secretary of State, to discuss international intervention in Syria and possible implementation of a no-fly zone.

Due to her influence and activism, she received a death threat from Syria, which was a reason she was contacted by film director Joe Piscatella, who wanted to make a movie about the dark side of social media in revolutions. That project later became a 2013 documentary #ChicagoGirl: The Social Network Takes on a Dictator, which was screened at Seattle International Film Festival in 2014.

In 2014, she attended an all-day protest summit RiseUp Summit.
