= William Davis (cardiologist) =

American cardiologist, low-carbohydrate diet advocate and author

William R. Davis
- Born: 1957 (age 68–69)
- Education: Saint Louis University
- Scientific career
- Fields: Medicine, Cardiology

William R. Davis (born 1957) is an American cardiologist, low-carbohydrate diet advocate and author of health books known for his stance against "modern wheat", which he labels a "perfect, chronic poison".

Medical experts have criticized Davis for making false assertions about wheat, unsupported by evidence-based medicine. His low-carbohydrate Wheat Belly diet has been cited by dietitians as an example of a fad diet and because of its restrictive nature is likely to be low in B-vitamins, calcium and vitamin D. He is the father of tennis player Lauren Davis.

== Wheat Belly in the public forum ==
Davis's book Wheat Belly became a New York Times bestseller within a month of publication in 2011. Davis says that all modern wheat, which he refers to as "Frankenwheat", is as toxic and as addictive as many drugs and makes people want to eat more food, especially junk foods. In an appearance on The Dr. Oz Show he said, "The wheat of today is nothing like the wheat of 1960, 1950—that is, the wheat that our moms or grandmothers had—so it has been changed. This new crop has implications for human health that have never been anticipated. So this is appropriate for nobody, no human, nobody in this audience, should be eating this modern creation of genetics research."

The book inspired analyses which compare Davis's conclusions with the current evidence-base published in the established scientific literature. One analysis found that Davis used some data that was associated, but did not prove causality (false analogy), compared food data that is not naturally comparable (that is, incommensurable), made false assertions, ignored studies that disproved some of his claims, made assertions that were not backed up by any case studies, made self-contradictory statements and, while he made some statements that were true, they were not catastrophic as he claimed.

A 2013 review in the Journal of Cereal Science, concluded "we consider that statements made in the book of Davis, as well as in related interviews, cannot be substantiated based on published scientific studies". A review by the American Association of Cereal Chemists which cited a recent review of studies on refined grains, noted that "the great majority [of studies] found no associations between the intake of refined-grain foods and cardiovascular disease, diabetes, weight gain, or overall mortality."

Harriet Hall has described Davis's wheat belly diet as "another low-carb diet that ignores the bulk of the scientific evidence, makes false associations, and exaggerates grains (pun intended) of truth into delusional mountains".

== On veganism ==
While Davis does not advocate vegan diets, he says that it is possible to stay wheat and grain free on a healthy plant-based diet. He says vegans should eat non-genetically modified fruits, vegetables, nuts, legumes and other seeds.

== Selected publications ==
- Super Gut: A Four-Week Plan to Reprogram Your Microbiome, Restore Health, and Lose Weight Hachette Books (February 2022) ISBN 0306846977
- Undoctored: Why Health Care Has Failed You and How You Can Become Smarter Than Your Doctor Rodale Books (May 9, 2017) ISBN 1623368669
- Wheat Belly: 10-Day Grain Detox: Reprogram Your Body for Rapid Weight Loss and Amazing Health Rodale Books (2015) ISBN 1623366364
- Wheat Belly Cookbook: 150 Recipes to Help You Lose the Wheat, Lose the Weight, and Find Your Path Back to Health Rodale Books (December 24, 2012) ISBN 1609619366
- Wheat Belly: Lose the Wheat, Lose the Weight, and Find Your Path Back to Health Rodale Books (Aug 30, 2011) ISBN 1609611543
- What Does My Heart Scan Show?: Everything You Need To Know About Your Heart Scan! American Security Network Incorporated (July 14, 2006) ISBN 0976742489
- Track Your Plaque: The only heart disease prevention program that shows how to use the new heart scans to detect, track and control coronary plaque iUniverse, Inc. (July 27, 2004) ISBN 0595316646

== See also ==
- Gliadin
- Gluten
- Paleolithic diet
- Atkins Diet
- Gluten-free diet
