= Roberto de Villacis =

American fashion designer

Roberto de Villacis (born March 10, 1967, as Robert O. Henrichsen de Villacis) is an Ecuadorian American fashion designer and artist, best known as for his Trash Couture clothing brand and art collective, United Aliens.

== Early life ==
De Villacis was born in Quito, Ecuador to American Civil Engineer Robert Henrichsen and Ecuadorian socialite and humanitarian Olga Ortiz de Villacis. He spent his early years between Ecuador, New York City, Florida and the Caribbean. When Roberto was seven, the family relocated to their beach house in Fort Lauderdale, Florida after the death of his father while working on an oil project in Trinidad and Tobago During his senior year at the Pinecrest Prep School, he won a scholarship for the Pratt Institute. After attending Pratt's foundation year, de Villacis transferred from Pratt to study fashion design at Studio Berçot in Paris where he was mentored by Madame Marie Rucki. After graduating in 1991, he remained in Paris where he created his first collection.

== Early career ==
His first collection was featured in Spanish Vogue, styled by Lisa Lovatt-Smith and Flavia Lafer, photographed by Karl Lagerfeld.

Shortly thereafter, Roberto was introduced to Stuart Kriesler, formally of Ralph Lauren, through a mutual friend, Temple St. Clair in New York. Kriesler presented Roberto to Saks Fifth Avenue who purchased his collection at age 24.

After a quick success, Roberto found he was unprepared to meet the demand for his product. He decided to take a sabbatical from Fashion and started focusing on his other artistic talents. He began working on light sculptures, which were a part of the "L'Art de la Table" and are now part of the permanent collection at the Museum of Decorative Arts at the Louvre in Paris.

In 1995, de Villacis worked as a head designer for the launch of Anna Molinari's signature label. In 1996 Roberto joined Missoni's creative team as their Men's Designer for the re-launch of their brand. He stayed with Missoni until 2000. He then consulted as an Art Director for Lancôme, creating the slogan "Believe in Beauty" and the "Poetry of Science" for Kerastase L’Oreal. In 2002 he founded Trash-Couture/Future Vintage London/Paris.

== Recent ==
In 2007 Roberto moved back to America after 20 years in Europe. Now based in Los Angeles, CA and Bal Harbour, FL, his focus shifted to Haute Couture for the Arts, catering to artists, aristocrats and an A-list clientele. American Idol and Grammy award winner Carrie Underwood selected Roberto to create the dress for the album cover Carnival Ride which went to become number one in America. His collaboration extended to designing the red carpet dress, a disintegrated ballgown top worn with jeans for the Pop idol show and an evening dress for the music video of the Disney film Enchanted.

His designs have been photographed by Helmut Newton, Ellen Von Unwerth, Steven Meisel and featured in Vanity Fair, Vogue, Harper's Bazaar, W, and Elle. Mega-stars including Penélope Cruz and Kirsten Dunst to super-models Kate Moss and Verushka showcased his original designs from red carpet premieres, press photos to charity events.
