= Meural =

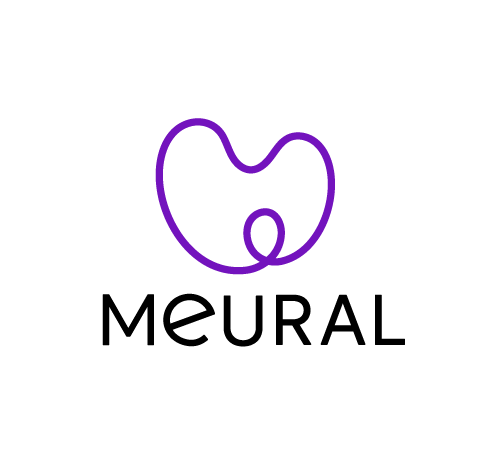
- Company type: Private
- Founded: August 2014
- Founder: Jerry Hu; Vladimir Vukicevic
- Headquarters: New York, New York
- Website: www.meural.com

Meural is an American technology company whose principal product is the Meural Canvas, a digital connected canvas built to showcase artwork and photography—both Meural- and user-provided. Through end-to-end production—a combination of proprietary hardware, software, and firmware—the digital frame is designed to look lifelike and textured.

== History ==
Co-founders Vladimir Vukicevic and Jerry Hu, both first-generation immigrants, met at NYU at freshmen orientation. Prior to founding Meural, Vukicevic was co-founder and CTO at RocketHub, a leading crowdfunding platform acquired by eFactor. He also currently serves on the Board of Directors at New York Foundation for the Arts. Hu was a product manager at FreshDirect, and has a background in art as a docent for the Fine Arts Museums of San Francisco.

In August 2014, Vukicevic and Hu founded Meural with the mission of facilitating art discovery and expression. The project was incubated out of Con Artist, an art collective, where they were able to get early feedback straight from artists. The first 12 months of the operation was dedicated to research and development, including: sourcing the LCD panel, developing the ambient light sensor brightness control, creating gesture control language, and designing the digital frames.

The team sold out their first round of inventory in late 2015, and began their next batch in the summer of 2016.

The startup behind the Meural art frame has been acquired by Netgear. The deal was announced during the router company’s analyst day and was confirmed to TechCrunch by a Meural spokesperson. Terms of the deal were not disclosed.

== Funding ==
Up until March 2016, Meural raised $695k from angel investors and venture capitalists, including Bolt, Jeff Baltimore and Jerry Colonna. In a seed round ending April 2016, Meural raised $2.45 million, with investors including Corigin Ventures, Barbara Corcoran Venture Partners, François-Henri Bennahmias of Audemars Piguet, Elio Leoni Sceti and Bolt.

== Technology ==
The Meural Canvas employs an in-plane switching display that renders over 16 million colors. It also has a low-reflective matte finish and an ambient light sensor for adaptive lighting.

Besides the Meural app and my.meural.com, users can change the featured image with the swipe of their hand, using the gesture control feature.

== Partnerships ==
To obtain their collection of work—which currently includes over 20,000 images—Meural partners with a variety of institutions, museums, and organizations. Current partners include Sedition, Bridgeman Images, Eyes on Walls, Lomography, 1000 Museums, Con Artist, and Galleray.

== See also ==
- Digital photo frame
