= Benjamin Patton =

American author, filmmaker, and film educator (born 1965)

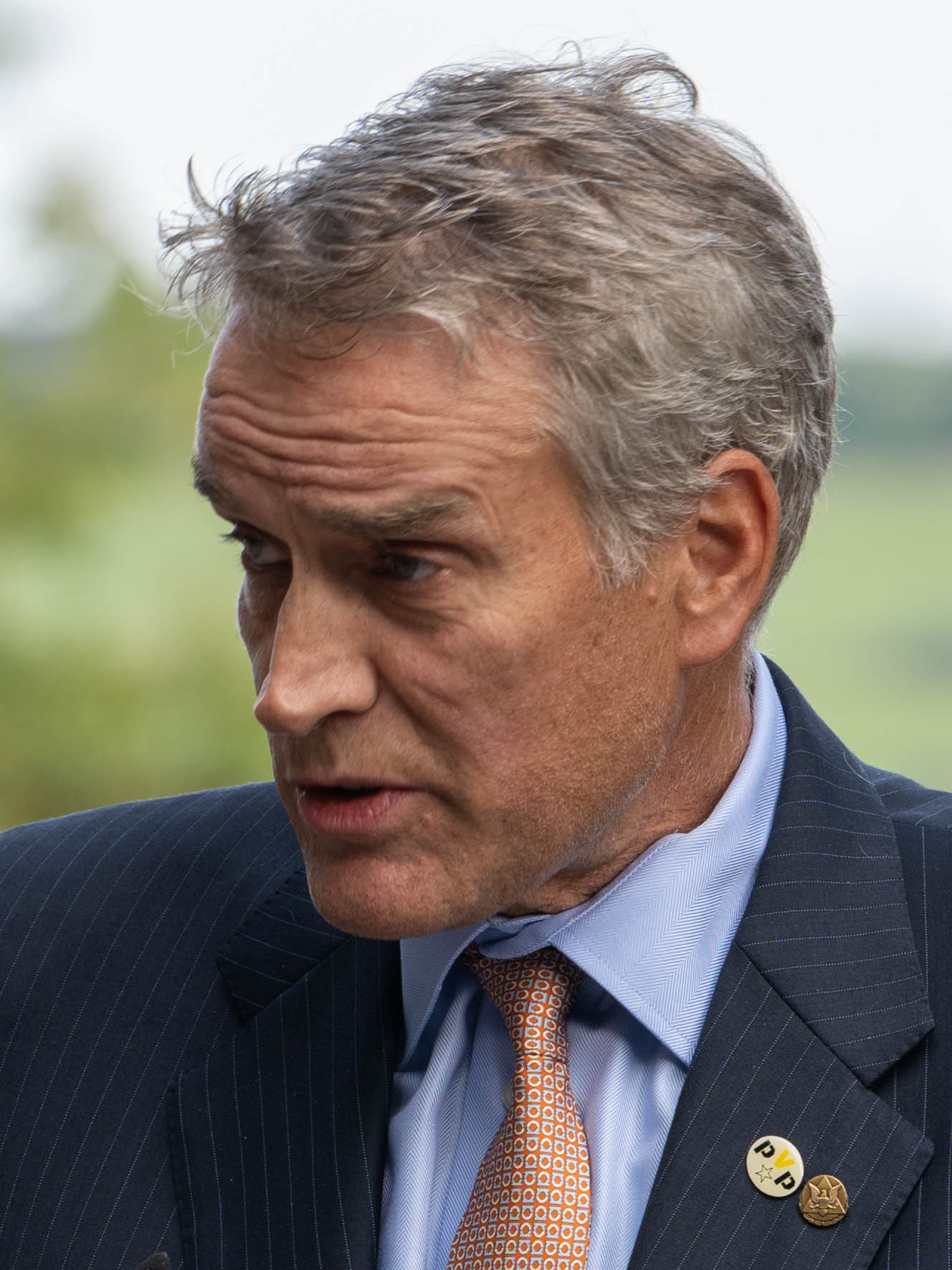
- Patton speaks at the 80th liberation ceremony of Ettelbruck, Luxembourg in 2024
- Born: July 28, 1965 (age 61)
- Education: Georgetown University; Columbia University (MA)
- Occupations: Author, filmmaker and film educator
- Spouse: Blair Miller (m. 2018)
- Parent(s): George Patton IV; Joanne Holbrook Patton
- Awards: Meritorious Public Service Medal

Benjamin Patton (born July 28, 1965) is an American author, filmmaker, entrepreneur and film educator.

He is the founder and executive director of the Patton Veterans Project nonprofit and CEO of Patton Films, a video production company established in 2026, concentrating on corporate films for clients in the defense and security industry.

Patton is also a founding partner at the Patton Spirits, which was founded by him and investment banker Kristoffer Mack.

Patton Spirits markets a premiere 5-year-old Kentucky Straight Rye and a 6-year-old Kentucky Straight Bourbon, crafted by Patton and currently sold direct-to-consumer.

== Biography ==
Patton was born in 1965, the youngest son of George Patton IV and grandson of General George S. Patton. He graduated from Georgetown University and then received his master's degree from Columbia University.

With Jennifer Scruby, he is the co-author of Growing Up Patton: Reflections on Heroes, History and Family Wisdom. He was awarded the U.S. Army Meritorious Public Service Medal in 2024.

Patton married Blair Emily Miller on 15 September 2018.

== Filmography ==
Year	Film	Casting
2011	Trapeze	Narrator
2013	Give It Up!	Narrator
2013	It Starts with One	Film producer
2015	The Most Beautiful Day	Voice actor
