= Sadjad Pourghanad =

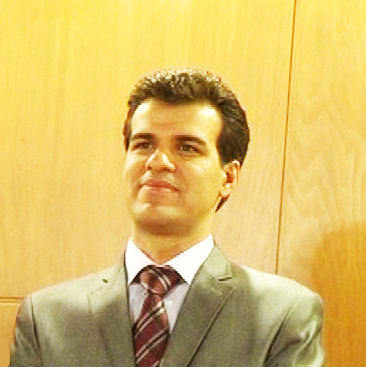
Musician and Music Critic

Sadjad Pourghanad (Persian: سجاد پورقناد; born 22 December 1981) is a Tar and Setar player, opera singer, Iranian journalist, founder of the Iranian Festival of Music-based Weblogs and Websites, and editor-in-chief of Harmony Talk, the online Persian journal on music.

== Learning Music ==
He started learning to play Setar in 1998 under the supervision of Masoud Shoari and music theory under the supervision of Hooshang Kamkar. His later instructors were masters including Hossein Dehlavi, Manouchehr Sahbaie, Keyvan Mirhadi, Mohammad Saeed Sharifian, Shapour Rahimi, Ali Nourbakhsh, Mohammad Saeed Sharifian, Florence Lippett and Khosro Elmiyeh.

== The Press and the Internet ==
Sadjad Pourghanad has been a pioneer of online musical activities on the internet in Iran ever since 1999 and used to write articles on music. Once the Persian websites on music were organized, Pourghanad started his collaboration with them. Right after Harmony Talk Journal was launched in 2004, Pourghanad served as its contributor. After 3 years, he was appointed and still is its editor-in-chief. Besides his activities on the internet, he has been collaborating with the Persian press. He has published myriads of articles on music in Kalameye Sabz Newspaper, Shargh Newspaper, Bahar Newspaper, Iran Newspaper, Rouzegar Newspaper, Arman Newspaper, etc. His articles were also published in magazines such as Honar-e-Mousighi (Art of Music) and Haft Honar (Seven Arts).

== Iranian Festival of Music-based Weblogs and Websites ==
In 2007, Sadjad Pourghanad and Reza Zarei organized a conference in Shiraz, with the collaboration of Harmony Talk Journal, in which online music activists participated. Finally, this summit led to the establishment of the Iranian Festival of Music-based Weblogs and Websites which was held for the first time on July 8, 2011, in Tehran under the secretary of Pourghanad. He was also the secretary for the Second Festival of Music-based Weblogs and Websites which was held on November 7, 2012. Pourghanad is also the Head of Sol Music Index.

== Musical Activities ==
Pourghanad was the leader of the Aria Ensemble, a Persian music ensemble, from 1998 to 2000. Then he established Sahba Kohan Ensemble and served as the art director of the ensemble while it was led by Ali Najafi Maleki till early 2012. He is, however, the leader of the ensemble as well as its art director. Pourghanad has given over 40 concerts in different arts centers, universities and concert halls in Iran. He has also sung the role of Mongol Commander as well as the Executioner in Rumi Opera directed by Behrouz Gharibpour and composed by Behzad Abdi and served as the foil to Shams (sang by Homayoun Shajarian) and Molana (sang by Mohammad Motamedi). Pourghanad also played Setar in this opera.

== Radio ==
Pourghanad collaborated with Iran Seda Radio Channel as music expert and host/expert.

== Awards ==
Sadjad Pourghanad won the first prize as the Setar player in the National Music Competition of Tehran Municipality in 2007.
