= Stephanie Watson =

American children's book author

Stephanie Elaine Watson is an American children's book author.

== Education ==
Watson graduated from Sarah Lawrence College in 2001.

== Bibliography ==
=== Novels ===
- Elvis & Olive (Scholastic Press, 2008)
- Elvis & Olive: Super Detectives (Scholastic Press, 2010)

=== Picture books ===
- The Wee Hours, illustrated by Mary GrandPré (Disney-Hyperion, 2013)
- Behold! A Baby, illustrated by Joy Ang (Bloomsbury, 2015)
- Best Friends in the Universe, illustrated by LeUyen Pham (Scholastic, 2018)

== Awards and honors ==
- Best Friends in the Universe was a 2019 Minnesota Book Award finalist.
- Behold! A Baby was a 2016 Minnesota Book Award finalist.
- Elvis & Olive and Elvis & Olive: Super Detectives were both Junior Library Guild selections.
