= RiseUp Summit =

Annual event held in Cairo, Egypt

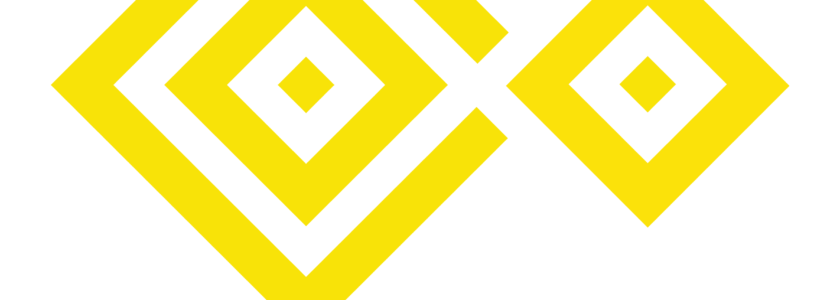
- Genre: Conference and Exhibition
- Dates: December
- Frequency: Annual
- Locations: Cairo, Egypt
- Years active: 12
- Inaugurated: 2013
- Founders: Muhammad M. Mansour, Abdelhameed Sharara, Con O'Donnell, Gehad Hussein
- Next event: November 25 – 27, 2021 at The Great Pyramids of Giza
- Attendance: 7,000
- Organizer: RiseUp, LLC
- Website: riseup.co

RiseUp Summit is an annual entrepreneurship and innovation event that takes place in Cairo, Egypt. It has been described as "one of the largest gatherings of entrepreneurs in the region". It started in 2013 to bring the MENA region's entrepreneurship ecosystem together. The summit is a three-day, entrepreneurship marathon. The first RiseUp Summit occurred in 2013.

After attending Austin's SXSW for the first time, founding partner Muhammad M. Mansour was inspired to co-create RiseUp Summit, with the support of other ecosystem players.

== About RiseUp ==
RiseUp is a platform that connects startups to the most relevant resources, worldwide.

== Participants ==
Previous participating firms include Uber, IBM, Facebook, The World Bank and Pepsi. Speakers have included Dave McClure from 500Startups, Mike Butcher from TechCrunch, Jared Friedman from Y Combinator and H.E John Casson.
