= Mohammad Firouzi =

Iranian musician

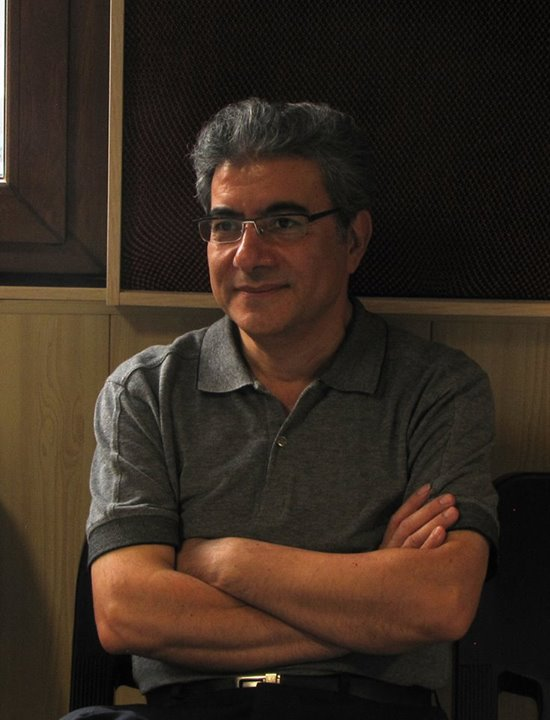
Mohammad Firouzi

Mohammad Firouzi (born 1958 in Tehran) is a prolific Iranian musician, whose primary instrument is the barbat.
