= Lisa Lovatt-Smith =

Writer and activist

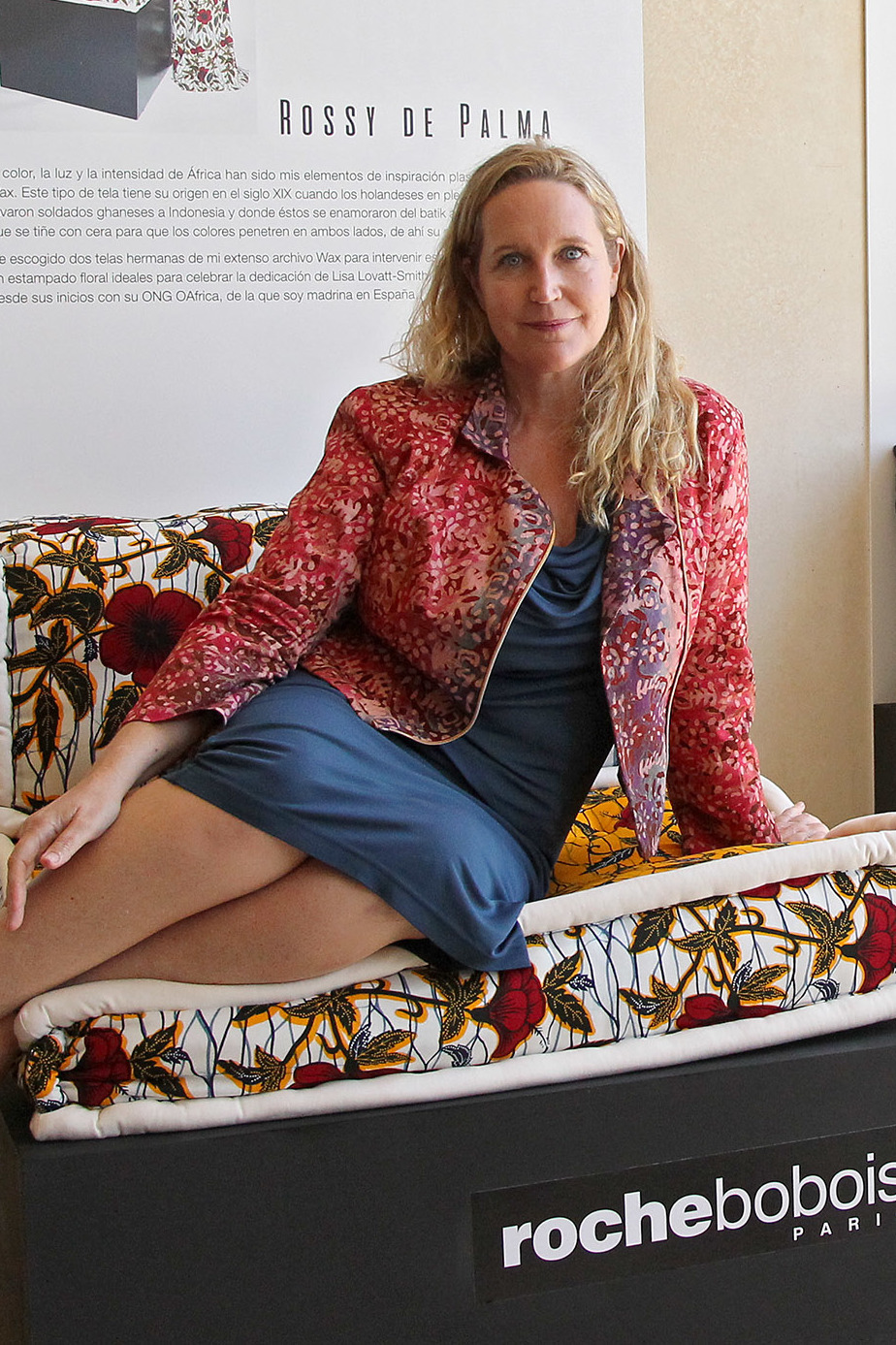
Lisa Lovatt-Smith in 2016 in Barcelona.

Lisa Lovatt-Smith is a British Ghanaian writer, editor, journalist and child activist. She is the former Photo Editor of British Vogue, Fashion Director of Spanish Vogue, and founder of OAfrica, a charity that supports vulnerable children. Living in Paris and Accra, Ghana since 2002, she has brought her contacts in international fashion and culture to spread awareness about African excellence in journalism, fashion, wellness, design and music through her public speaking and digital presence, supporting global recognition of African talent. She was married to the French designer Olivier Gagnère.

== Early life ==
Lovatt-Smith was born in Barcelona, Spain. Her parents are from a working class area in the north of England and moved to the Mediterranean coast. She was a child model, and a scholarship child who already knew she wanted to be a writer. After her parents divorced she lived between Rome, Paris and Barcelona as an adolescent, and as a result has been quatri-lingual from an early age.

== Professional life ==
She won a writing competition for Vogue magazine at the age of 17 in 1984 and was awarded a job in London with the magazine. At age 19, she was made picture editor by Anna Wintour, becoming the youngest editor in the magazine's history and by the age of 21 she was fashion director of the newly launched Spanish Vogue, and the youngest person in Conde Nast to become a fashion director, a record she holds to this day. She was instrumental in opening what is now Spanish GQ, Spanish AD and German AD. During her time with Vogue Lovatt-Smith edited 13 books on fashion photography and design. She collaborated with Franca Sozzani at Italian Conde Nast from 1985 until Franca's death in 2016, including supporting Franca with "Fashion For Development" in Africa. In 2014 Lovatt-Smith's memoir "Who Knows Tomorrow" was published in the USA and UK. There were later French, Spanish and Australian editions.It was re-edited in Spain in 2021, as a paperback.

== Charity work ==
At the age of 23, Lisa fostered an orphan girl named Sabrina. In 2002, during a volunteering trip to Ghana with Sabrina, Lisa founded OAfrica. OAfrica helps abandoned children in Ghana by providing healthcare, startup capital, resettlement packages and scholarships and they also find foster families for the few with no possible family placements. Since 2002, Lisa has been working in Ghana, campaigning against corrupt private orphanages, helping children separated from their families by poverty, the H.I.V. - AIDS epidemic or the exodus from rural to urban areas. Lisa gave two TED talks, in Abidjan and in Accra on this work. Since 2015, OAfrica is increasingly involved in advocacy, on and off-line, for positive behaviour change around child rights. In 2012 Lovatt-smith won the Clarins Woman of the Year Award in Paris, France and the Face Africa award in New York City. In 2019 Lisa was recognized in her hometown with the prestigious LiberPress Award.She naturalized Ghanaian in 2025.

== Awards ==
2012: Face Africa Award, New York City, USA 2012: Clarins Award, Paris, France 2019:LiberPress Award 2019, Spain

== Publications ==
• Paris Interiors (Taschen) by Lisa Lovatt-Smith (1994) • Moroccan Interiors (Taschen) by Lisa Lovatt-Smith (1995) • Provence Interiors (Taschen) by Lisa Lovatt-Smith (1996) • Fashion Images de Mode 1 (STEDIL PUBLISHERS) by Lisa Lovatt Smith and Patrick Remy (1996) • Fashion Images De Mode No.2 (STEDIL PUBLISHERS) by Lisa Lovatt Smith and Patrick Remy (1997) • Fashion Images de Mode No. 3: The Best Fashion Photography of the Year (STEDIL PUBLISHERS) by Lisa Lovatt-Smith (1998) • Fashion Images De Mode No. 4 (STEDIL PUBLISHERS) by Lisa Lovatt-Smith (1999) • Fashion Images de Mode No. 5 (STEDIL PUBLISHERS) by Lovatt-Smith (2000) • Fashion Images de Mode, No. 6 (VISION ON PUBLISHERS, UK) by Lisa Lovatt-Smith (2001) • London Living (ABBEVILLE PUBLISHERS, NYC) by Lisa Lovatt-Smith (1997) • Mediterranean Living (ABBEVILLE PUBLISHERS, NYC) by Lisa Lovatt-Smith (1998) • New York Living (ABBEVILLE PUBLISHERS, NYC) by Lisa Lovatt-Smith and Alberto Heras (1999) • The Fashion House: Inside the Homes of Leading Designers (CONRAN OCTOPUS PUBLISHERS, UK) by Lisa Lovatt-Smith (1997). • Who Knows Tomorrow, a Memoir of Finding Family (PENGUIN BOOKS, AUSTRALIA/ ARTHAUD, FRANCE/ EDICIONES TURNER, SPAIN) (2015) Re-issued as a paperback in 2021. • The Missoni Family Cookbook, (EDITOR), (ASSOULINE, USA) by Francesco Missoni (2018) • Family Based v. Institutional Care (OAfrica, GHANA), with Dzifa Tamakloe (2022) • Jamaica Vibes,(ASSOULINE, USA), with Novia Mcdonald Whyte, (2023) •Ghana, The Orange Economy, (EDITOR), (2025)
