= Decoding Deepak =

- Directed by: Gotham Chopra
- Written by: Gotham Chopra
- Produced by: Scott Carlin; Gotham Chopra; Emilio Diez Barroso; Darlene Caamaño; Mark Rinehart
- Starring: Deepak Chopra; Mallika Chopra; Gotham Chopra; Oprah Winfrey; Lady Gaga; Bill O'Reilly; Dennis Miller
- Music by: Huma Huma
- Distributed by: NALA Films; SnagFilms
- Release dates: March 11, 2012 (South by Southwest); October 5, 2012 (U.S.)
- Running time: 74 minutes
- Country: United States
- Language: English

Decoding Deepak is a 2012 feature-length documentary film directed by Gotham Chopra about his father Deepak Chopra. It was released in the United States in theaters, on video on demand and digital platforms, on October 5, 2012. It was distributed by SnagFilms, a digital distributor of independent films.

The film is dedicated to David Simon M.D. (1951-2012), close friend of the Chopra family who died of a brain tumor on January 31, 2012.
