= 42nd Sports Emmy Awards =

- Date: June 8, 2021
- Location: Virtual

Television/radio coverage
- Network: Watch.TheEmmys.TV

The 42nd Sports Emmy Awards were presented by the National Academy of Television Arts and Sciences (NATAS), honoring the best in American sports television coverage in 2020. The winners were announced on June 8, 2021, via live-stream at Watch.TheEmmys.TV and other apps associated.

The nominations were announced on April 20, 2021, with ESPN being the network with more nominations with 41 and the Super Bowl LV being the most nominated program, with 11.

== Winners and nominees ==
The nominees were announced on April 20, 2021. Winners in each category are listed first, in boldface.

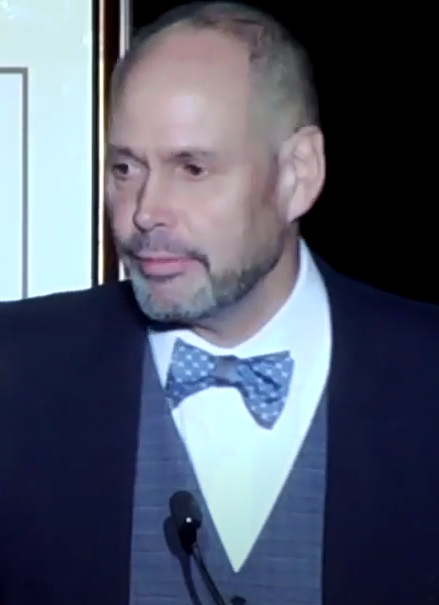
Ernie Johnson Jr., Outstanding Sports Personality/Studio Host winner

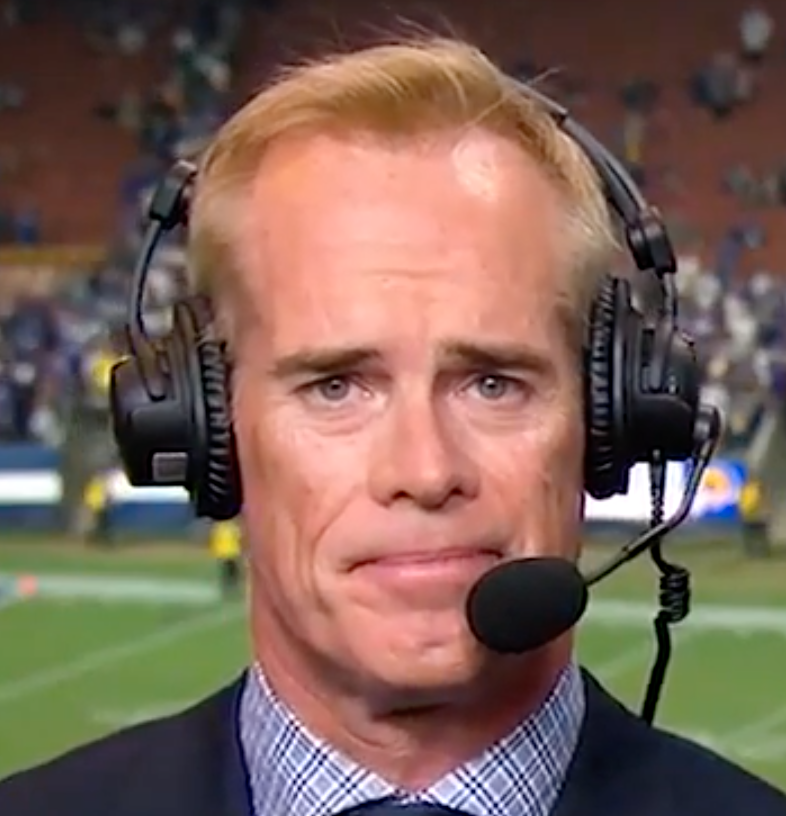
Joe Buck, Outstanding Sports Personality/Play-by-Play winner

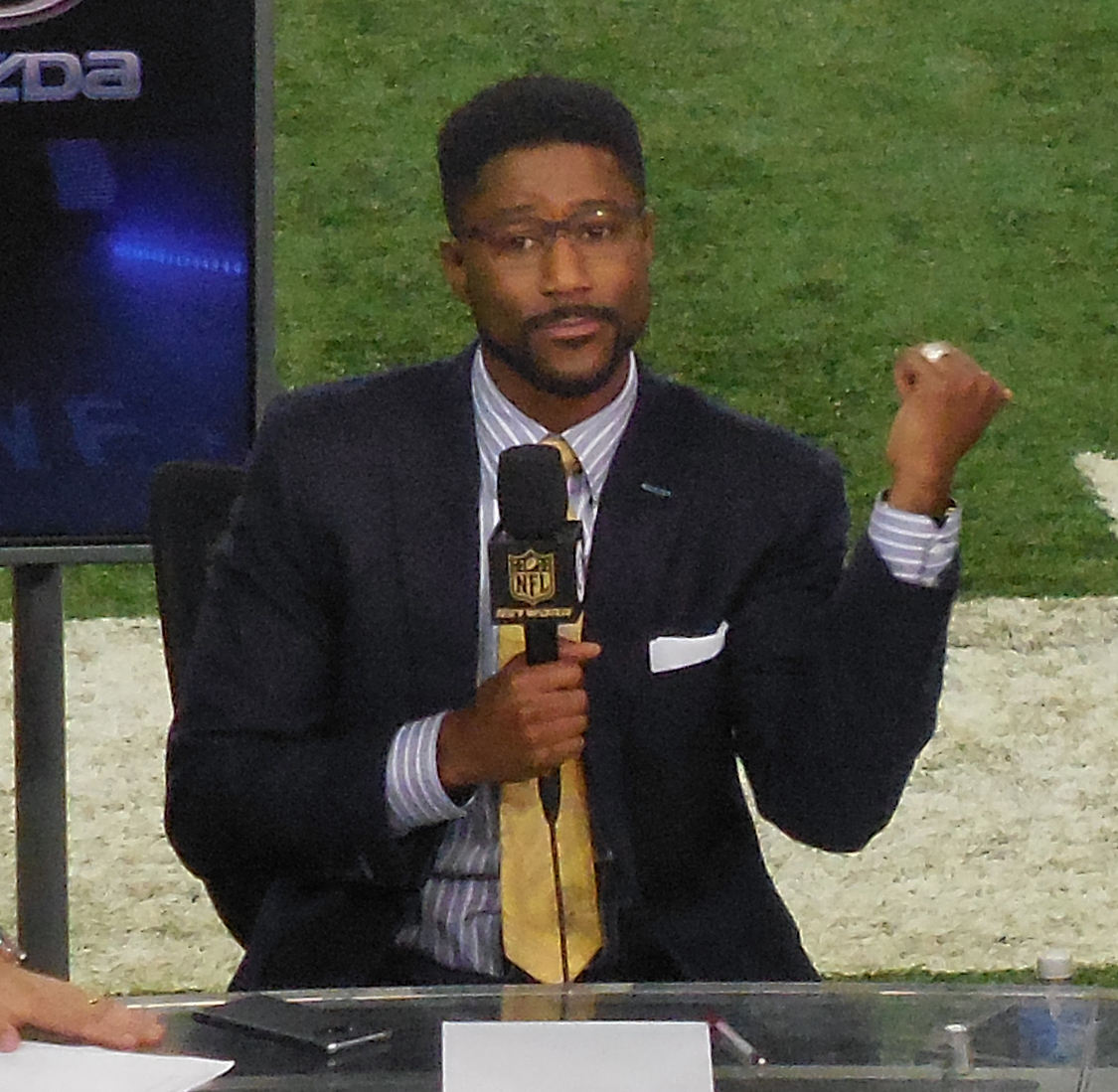
Nate Burleson, Outstanding Sports Personality/Studio Analyst winner

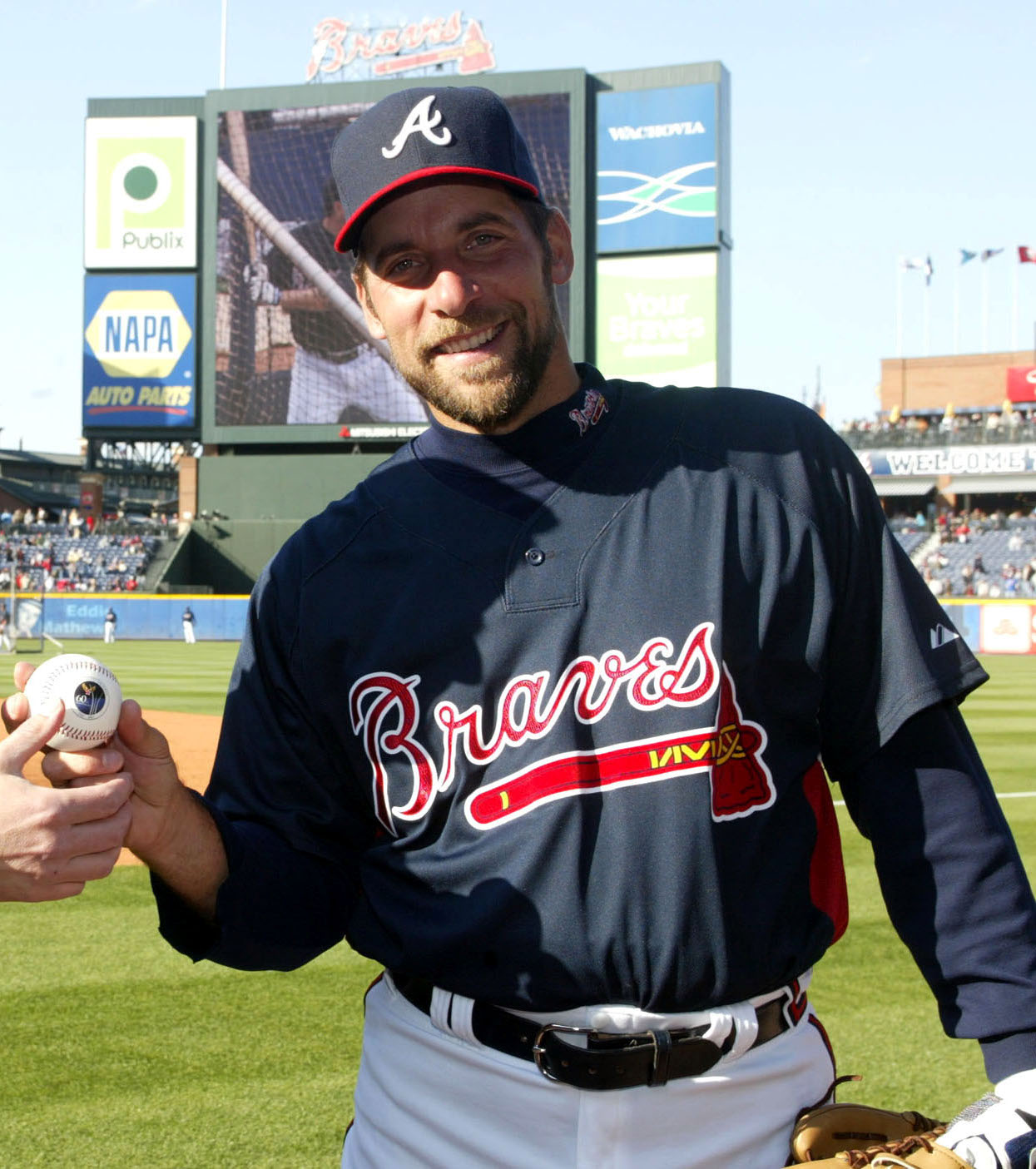
John Smoltz, Outstanding Sports Personality/Sports Event Analyst winner

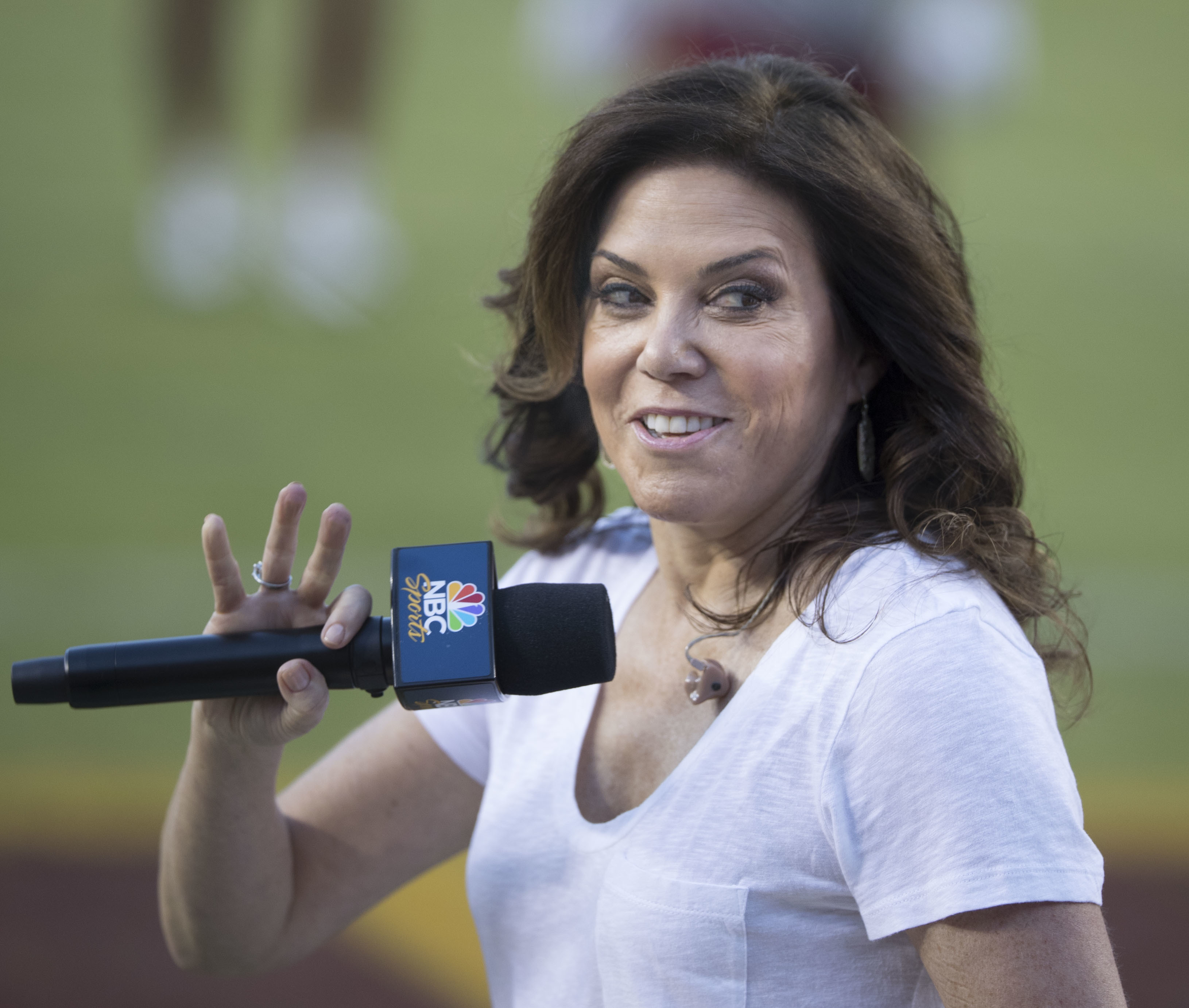
Michele Tafoya, Outstanding Sports Personality/Sports Reporter winner

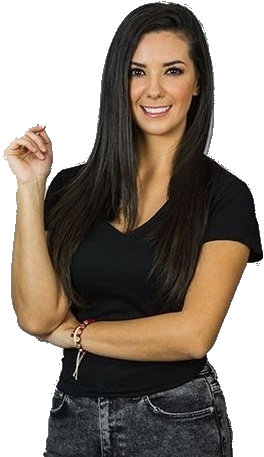
Pilar Pérez, Outstanding On-Air Personality in Spanish winner

=== Programming ===
Outstanding Live Sports Special	Outstanding Live Sports Series
**2020 NBA All-Star Game on TNT (TNT)**; The 116th World Series – Tampa Bay Rays vs. Los Angeles Dodgers (FOX); The 146th Kentucky Derby (NBC); The Match on TNT – Champions for Charity (TNT); Super Bowl LV – Kansas City Chiefs vs. Tampa Bay Buccaneers (CBS)	**Sunday Night Football (NBC)**; FOX NASCAR (FOX/FS1); FOX NFL (FOX/NFL Network); NFL on CBS (CBS); PGA Tour on CBS (CBS)
Outstanding Playoff Coverage	Outstanding Edited Sports Event Coverage
**NFC Wild Card Game – Chicago Bears vs. New Orleans Saints (Nickelodeon)**; 2020 NBA Playoffs on TNT (TNT); AFC Playoffs (CBS); NASCAR Playoffs on NBC (NBC/NBCSN); Sunday Night Football: Playoffs (NBC/Peacock)	**NFL Game Day All-Access – Super Bowl LV (YouTube)**; America’s Game: The 2019 Kansas City Chiefs (NFL Network); Hey Rookie: Welcome To The NFL – 2020 NFL Draft (ESPN); NHL on NBC – WIRED: Stadium Series – Los Angeles Kings vs. Colorado Avalanche (NBCSN); UFC The Walk – McGregor vs. Cowboy (UFC Fight Pass)
Outstanding Edited Sports Special	Outstanding Edited Sports Series
**SC Presents: 2020 – Heroes, History and Hope (ESPN)**; Inside the NBA – Kobe Bryant Memorial (TNT); NFL 360 – Black History Month (NFL Network); NFL 360 – Women in Football (NFL Network); The Undefeated Presents: The Stop – Living, Driving and Dying While Black (ESPN)	**The Shop: UNINTERRUPTED (HBO)**; Defying Gravity: The Untold Story of Women’s Gymnastics (YouTube); Greatness Code (Apple TV+); The Playbook (Netflix); We Are the Champions (Netflix)
Outstanding Esports Coverage	Outstanding Short Sports Documentary
**League of Legends World Final: DAMWON vs. Suning (YouTube)**; 2020 Call of Duty League Championship Weekend – DAL Empire vs. ATL FaZe (YouTube); IEM Katowice 2020 Grand Final: NaVi vs. G2 (Twitch); iRacing Pro Invitational: Homestead-Miami (FOX/FS1); Overwatch League 2020 Grand Finals: San Francisco Shock vs. Seoul Dynasty (YouTube)	**Blackfeet Boxing: Not Invisible (ESPN+/ESPN)**; E:60 – Twice the Fight: A Family’s Battle and Love of Football (ESPN); NFL Films Presents: The Camden Comeback (FS1); UFC Chronicles: Love, Death and Prizefighting (UFC Fight Pass); The Undefeated Presents: Why I Play (ESPN)
Outstanding Long Sports Documentary	Outstanding Serialized Sports Documentary
**Rising Phoenix (Netflix)**; Ringside (Showtime); The Scheme (HBO); The Weight of Gold (HBO); Yellow Brick Road (Golf Channel)	**Outcry (Showtime)**; All or Nothing: Tottenham Hotspur (Amazon); The Cost of Winning (HBO); Formula 1: Drive to Survive (Netflix); Texas 6 (Paramount+)
Outstanding Studio Show - Weekly	Outstanding Studio Show - Daily
**Inside the NBA (TNT)**; College GameDay (ESPN); Football Night in America (NBC); FOX NFL Sunday (FOX); The NFL Today (CBS)	**SportsCenter (ESPN)**; The Dan Patrick Show (Peacock/DIRECTV); Good Morning Football (NFL Network); MLB Tonight (MLB Network); NFL Total Access (NFL Network); Pardon the Interruption (ESPN)
Outstanding Studio Show - Limited Run	Outstanding Sports News/Feature Anthology
**Inside the NBA: 2020 NBA Playoffs (TNT)**; College GameDay: NFL Draft (ESPN); FOX MLB: The Postseason (FOX/FS1); FOX NFL Sunday: The Playoffs (FOX); Postseason NFL Countdown (ESPN)	**Real Sports with Bryant Gumbel (HBO)**; Dispatches (Outside TV); E:60 (ESPN); NFL 360 (NFL Network); SC Featured (ESPN2/ESPNews)
Outstanding Sports Journalism	Outstanding Open/Tease
**Real Sports with Bryant Gumbel – Fallout: Japan's Olympic Secret (HBO)**; E:60 – Imperfect: The Roy Halladay Story (ESPN); E:60 – The Hero of Goodall Park (ESPN); Real Sports with Bryant Gumbel – Dangerous Games: Playing On Amid the Pandemic (HBO); Real Sports with Bryant Gumbel – The Fight Before the Fight: Weight Cutting in MMA (HBO)	**Super Bowl LV – Stand by Me (CBS)**; 2020 NBA All-Star Game on TNT – Something Beautiful (TNT); E:60 – Imperfect: The Roy Halladay Story' (ESPN); E:60 – Project 11: Alex Smith (ESPN); The Masters – What Does the Masters Sound Like? (CBS)
Outstanding Short Feature	Outstanding Long Feature
**Sunday NFL Countdown – The Big Mo Show (ESPN)**; E:60 – Teddy Bear Toss (ESPN); NFL 360 – I Love Jags (NFL Network); NFL Total Access – Reality vs. Perception (NFL Network); SC Featured – Tears (ESPN); SC Featured – Together (ESPN.com)	**NFL 360 – The Gift of Gaba (NFL Network)**; NFL 360 – Darren Waller: The Other Side (NFL Network); NFL 360 – Sincerely, Q (NFL Network); SC Featured – Fighting for Aniah (ESPN); Super Bowl LV – Before Jackie (CBS)
Outstanding Studio Show in Spanish	Outstanding Feature Story in Spanish
**SportsCenter Deportes (ESPN Deportes)**; ESPN Fútbol Center (ESPN Deportes); Fútbol Central (Univision/TUDN); La Liga Premier Extra (Telemundo); La Liga Premier Tercer Tiempo (Telemundo); República Deportiva (Univision/TUDN)	**Greenland – Colombia (ESPN Deportes)**; República Deportiva – Gracias al Deporte (Univision/TUDN); SC Reportajes – 21 – Roberto Clemente (ESPN Deportes); SC Reportajes – El Paso Strong (ESPN Deportes)
Outstanding Interactive Experience - Event Coverage	Outstanding Interactive Experience - Original Programming
**NBA App – Season Restart (NBA Digital)**; 2020 Youth Olympics AR (IOC Sports); FOX MLB: The Postseason (FOX/FS1/FOXSports.com/MLB Network); IRONMAN VR Pro Challenge – Virtual Racing Series (Facebook Watch); The Match: Champions for Change – BR Cart Cam Live (Bleacher Report)	**NBA on TNT Tuesday (TNT)**; 100k Cameras – The Return of NASCAR (FOX/FS1); #NBATogether (TNT) ** #SandlotToTheShow (MLB Network); Inside the NBA (TNT)
Outstanding Digital Innovation	Outstanding Sports Promotional Announcement
**NBA on TNT – AT&T 5G Holovision (TNT)**; The Last Ascent (RBTV); NFL Media – Virtual Production (NFL Media Group); SportsNation – Football Visualization Platform (ESPN/ESPN+/ESPN.com/Twitter); Super Bowl LV – As One: The Lombardi Comeback (CBS)	**The Last Dance – Predictions (ESPN)**; FOX MLB – Play Ball (FOX/FS1/FS2/FOX News); Hulu Doesn’t Just Have Live Sports – Tom Brady’s Big Announcement (Hulu); Hulu Has Live Sports – The Deepfake (Hulu); Tokyo 2020 Olympic Games – #StrongerTogether (Olympic Channel/NBCSN); Tokyo 2020 Olympic Games – "Summer", "Light of Mine", "Even More" (NBC)

=== Personality ===
Outstanding Sports Personality/Studio Host	Outstanding Sports Personality/Play-by-Play
**Ernie Johnson Jr. (TNT)**; Rich Eisen (NFL Network/Peacock/NBCSN/DIRECTV/B/R Live); Rachel Nichols (ESPN); Mike Tirico (NBC/NBCSN/Golf Channel); Scott Van Pelt (ESPN)	**Joe Buck (FOX/FS1/NFL Network)**; Mike Breen (ABC); Mike Emrick (NBC/NBCSN); Al Michaels (NBC); Jim Nantz (CBS)
Outstanding Sports Personality/Studio Analyst	Outstanding Sports Personality/Sports Event Analyst
**Nate Burleson (CBS/CBS Sports Network/NFL Network)**; Jay Bilas (ESPN/ESPN2); Kirk Herbstreit (ESPN); Harold Reynolds (MLB Network); Kenny Smith (TNT)	**John Smoltz (FOX/FS1/MLB Network)**; Doris Burke (ESPN); Cris Collinsworth (NBC); Kirk Herbstreit (ESPN); Jeff Van Gundy (ABC)
Outstanding Sports Personality/Sports Reporter	Outstanding Sports Personality/Emerging On-Air Talent
**Michele Tafoya (NBC)**; Erin Andrews (FOX/NFL Network); Ken Rosenthal (FOX/FS1); Lisa Salters (ESPN/ABC); Tracy Wolfson (CBS/CBS Sports Network)	**Emmanuel Acho (FOX/FS1)**; Malika Andrews (ESPN); Joe Davis (FOX/FS1/NFL Network); Andrew Hawkins (NFL Network); Joshua Perry (Big Ten Network)
Outstanding On-Air Personality in Spanish
**Pilar Pérez (ESPN Deportes)**; Andrés Cantor (Telemundo); Ernesto Jerez (ESPN Deportes); Ana Jurka (Telemundo); Adriana Monsalve (Univision/TUDN); Mauricio Pedroza (ESPN Deportes); Luis Omar Tapia (Univision/TUDN)

=== Technical ===
Outstanding Technical Team Event	Outstanding Technical Team Studio
**Super Bowl LV – Kansas City Chiefs vs. Tampa Bay Buccaneers (CBS)**; College Football Playoff National Championship – Ohio State Buckeyes vs. Alabama Crimson Tide (ESPN); FOX NASCAR (FOX/FS1) ** The Masters (CBS); NBA Bubble (ESPN/TNT/NBA)	**College GameDay (ESPN)**; 2020 NFL draft (ESPN/ABC/NFL Network); FOX NASCAR (FOX/FS1); MLB Tonight (MLB Network); The Super Bowl Today (CBS)
Outstanding Camera Work - Short Form	Outstanding Camera Work - Long Form
**One Shot. – Catherine Aeppel and Johnny Schaer (RBTV)**; The 146th Kentucky Derby – The Adjustment (NBC); FOX NFL Sunday – Social Justice: Oyate’ un Ito’wapi – Pictures of My People (FOX); Inside the NFL – Super Bowl LV (Showtime); NFL GameDay Morning – Who Are We (NFL Network)	**The Old World – A Mindtrip Through Europe – Toni Tillmann, Mathias Bergmann, Andreas Tillmann and Michael Tillmann (RBTV)**; Blackfeet Boxing: Not Invisible (ESPN+/ESPN); Return to Earth: "The Series" (Outside TV); Rising Phoenix (Netflix); Tua (FOX)
Outstanding Editing - Short Forn	Outstanding Editing - Long Form
**NBA on TNT – Mamba – Jack Bannon, Gibson Hazard and Brendan O’Connor (TNT)**; Greatness Code (Apple TV+); NFL GameDay Morning – Who Are We (NFL Network); NFL Total Access – Reality vs. Perception (NFL Network); Sunday NFL Countdown – The Big Mo Show (ESPN); Super Bowl LV – Stand by Me (CBS); The Undefeated Presents The Stop – Living, Driving and Dying While Black Open (ESPN)	**NFL 360 – The Gift of Gaba – John Orfanopoulos (NFL Network)**; The Old World – A Mindtrip Through Europe (RBTV); Rising Phoenix (Netflix); The Scheme (HBO); We Are the Champions (Netflix)
Outstanding Music Direction	Outstanding Studio or Production Design/Art Direction
**Rising Phoenix – Daniel Pemberton, George Doman, Toni Hickman, Keith Jones (Netflix)**; FOX NFL Sunday – Dawn of Venus/Jose Gonzalez Teardrop (FOX); Super Bowl LV – Stand by Me (CBS); Under the Grapefruit Tree: The CC Sabathia Story (HBO); Yellow Brick Road (Golf Channel)	**NASCAR Race Hub (FS1)**; 2020 NBA All-Star Game on TNT – Something Beautiful (TNT); National League Division Series – Cutouts (MLB Network); The Shop: UNINTERRUPTED (HBO); Super Bowl LV – Before Jackie (CBS)
Outstanding Live Event Audio/Sound	Outstanding Post-Produced Audio/Sound
**Sunday Night Football (NBC)**; FOX MLB (FOX/FS1); NASCAR on NBC – Playoffs (NBC); NFL on CBS (CBS); US Open Tennis (ESPN)	**NASCAR 2020: Under Pressure (MotorTrend)**; Hard Knocks – Los Angeles (HBO); NASCAR ALL IN: Battle for Daytona (MotorTrend); The Old World – A Mindtrip Through Europe (RBTV); The Playbook (Netflix)
Outstanding Live Graphic Design	Outstanding Post-Produced Graphic Design
**NFC Wild Card Game – Chicago Bears vs. New Orleans Saints (Nickelodeon)**; College Football (ESPN/ABC); FOX NFL (FOX/NFL Network); MLB Tonight – Welcome Home (MLB Network); Super Bowl LV (CBS)	**Greatness Code – Emily Eckstein, Lauren Fisher, Orlando Salva, Vinnie Thomas (Apple TV+)**; NFL 360 – Sincerely, Q (NFL Network); NFL on ESPN (ESPN/ABC); Super Bowl LV – Before Jackie (CBS); Women in Sports Vignette Series (CBS Sports Network)
The Dick Schaap Outstanding Writing Award Short Form	Outstanding Writing Award Long Form
**National League Division Series – Cutouts – Greg Jennings (MLB Network)**; FOX NFL Sunday – And Justice For All (FOX); NFL Total Access – Reality vs. Perception (NFL Network); PGA News Conference Show – Distance (ESPN); SC Presents: 2020 – Heroes, History and Hope – Enough (ESPN)	**NFL Films Presents – The Lumberman Quarterback – Garrett Fittizzi and Ty Schadt (FS1)**; The Arena on TNT – We Are Home (TNT); Hard Knocks – Los Angeles (HBO); Super Bowl LV – Before Jackie (CBS); When New York Was One (FS1)
The George Wensel Technical Achievement Award
**MLB Network Showcase – Statcast 3D (MLB Network)**; FOX NASCAR – The Racing Drone (FOX/FS1); FOX NFL – Megalodon (FOX); MLB Postseason on tbs. – Base Cam (tbs); Notre Dame Football – NBC HDR LUTs (NBC)

== Multiple wins ==
Shows that received multiple nominations
Wins	Show	Network
2	NBA on TNT	TNT
2	NFC Wild Card Game	Nickelodeon
2	NFL 360	NFL Network
2	Real Sports with Bryant Gumbel	HBO
2	Rising Phoenix	Netflix
2	Sunday Night Football	NBC
2	Super Bowl LV	CBS

Nominations by Network
Wins	Network
7	TNT
6	ESPN
5	FS1
4	NFL Network
3	CBS
3	ESPN Deportes
3	FOX
3	HBO
3	MLB Network
3	NBC
2	Netflix
2	Nickelodeon
2	Red Bull TV
2	YouTube

== Multiple nominations ==
Shows that received multiple nominations
Nominations	Show	Network
11	Super Bowl LV	CBS
9	NFL 360	NFL Network
7	E:60	ESPN
4	Fox NASCAR	FOX, FS1
4	Fox NFL Sunday	FOX
4	NFL Total Access	NFL Network
4	Real Sports with Bryant Gumbel	HBO
4	Rising Phoenix	Netflix
4	SC Featured	ESPN, ESPN2; ESPN.com, ESPNews
3	NBA All-Star Game on TNT	TNT
3	FOX NFL	FOX, NFL Network
3	Greatness Code	Apple TV+
3	Inside the NBA	TNT
3	MLB Tonight	MLB Network
3	The Old World – A Mindtrip Through Europe	RBTV
3	The Undefeated Presents	ESPN
2	Blackfeet Boxing: Not Invisible	ESPN+, ESPN
2	College GameDay	ESPN
2	FOX MLB: The Postseason	FOX, FS1, FoxSports.com, MLB Network
2	Hard Knocks	HBO
2	National League Division Series	MLB Network
2	NBA on TNT	TNT
2	NFC Wild Card Game	Nickelodeon
2	NFL Films Presents	FS1
2	NFL GameDay Morning	NFL Network
2	NFL on CBS	CBS
2	República Deportiva	Univision, TUDN
2	SC Presents: 2020 – Heroes, History and Hope	ESPN
2	SC Reportajes	ESPN Deportes
2	Sunday NFL Countdown	ESPN
2	Sunday Night Football	NBC, Peacock
2	The 146th Kentucky Derby	NBC
2	The Masters	CBS
2	The Playbook	Netflix
2	The Scheme	HBO
2	The Shop: UNINTERRUPTED	HBO
2	Tokyo 2020 Olympic Games	NBC, NBCSN, Olympic Channel
2	We Are the Champions	Netflix
2	Yellow Brick Road	Golf Channel

Nominations by Network
Nominations	Network
41	ESPN
27	NFL Network
26	FOX
22	CBS
19	FS1
17	TNT
15	NBC
13	HBO
10	MLB Network
9	Netflix
8	ESPN Deportes
6	ABC
6	NBCSN
5	RBTV
5	TUDN
5	Univision
4	Telemundo
4	YouTube
3	Apple TV+
3	CBS Sports Network
3	ESPN+
3	Golf Channel
3	Peacock
3	Showtime
2	DIRECTV
2	ESPN.com
2	ESPN2
2	Hulu
2	MotorTrend
2	Nickelodeon
2	Outside TV
2	UFC Fight Pass
