= Gotham Chopra =

American documentarian and media entrepreneur

- Born: Gautama Chopra; February 23, 1975 (age 51); Boston, Massachusetts, U.S.
- Spouse: Candice Chen
- Children: 1
- Father: Deepak Chopra
- Relatives: Mallika Chopra (sister); Sanjiv Chopra (uncle)
- Website: Liquid Comics; Religion of Sports; The Chopra Well channel

Gotham Chopra (born Gautam Chopra on February 23, 1975) is an American sports documentarian, media entrepreneur, producer, podcast host, director, journalist, and author. He is a co-founder of Religion of Sports, Liquid Comics, Chopra Media, and the Chopra Well. His work often focuses on sports themes, having worked with athletes such as Tom Brady, LeBron James, Kobe Bryant, Simone Biles and Michael Strahan.

== Early life ==
Chopra was born Gautam Chopra in what is now part of the Brigham and Women's Hospital in Boston, Massachusetts in 1975, the son of spiritualist and author Deepak Chopra and his wife, Rita. He is a first-generation American and the first in his family to be born outside of India. He and his sister Mallika were raised in the Boston suburb of Lincoln. As a child, Chopra was extremely interested in sports, enough that his mother worried that he would never have a career. He is a lifelong Red Sox, Patriots, Celtics, and Bruins fan. His favorite athlete while growing up was Larry Bird. At age 13, he went on tour "as a roadie" with Michael Jackson, a friend of his father's, on his Dangerous World Tour. Chopra's father was busy and rarely home during the first years of Chopra's childhood. He recalls that his father drank and smoked a lot until he joined the Transcendental Meditation (TM) movement when Chopra was five. The family as a whole started practicing TM.

Chopra graduated from Belmont Hill School in 1993, then Columbia University with a bachelor's degree in English and Literature. In 1993, while Chopra was in college, the family relocated to California. While at Columbia, he wrote his first book, Child of the Dawn, and helped Michael Jackson write lyrics to his songs.

== Career ==
After graduating from Columbia, Chopra was a news anchor for the Los Angeles-based Channel One News, which broadcast to teenagers in social studies classes across the United States. He found out later that he was hired because one of the Channel One executives was a fan of his fathers'. He became a war correspondent and was stationed internationally. It was during this time that a producer recommended Chopra change the spelling of his name, Gautam, to match how he pronounced it to prevent mispronunciation. In August 2001, he was arrested at Islamabad International Airport when empty bullet shells were found in his bag. These were a gift from the Taliban, who he had been in Pakistan to interview. His father, at this point popular within celebrity circles, called Colin Powell and arranged his release. Within a few weeks, 9/11 occurred and Chopra's interview tapes were confiscated. Other interviews he conducted during this time were with George W. Bush, John Glenn, and the Dalai Lama. He left Channel One in 2005. Between 2006 and 2008, he worked as a consultant for Current TV.

In 2000, he co-founded Chopra Media with his sister Mallika. This company primarily develops media initiatives for their father but also oversees television shows and films. In 2012, Chopra launched the YouTube channel The Chopra Well along with his father and sister. This channel features a number of healthy and spiritual living tips, guided meditations, and guest interviews. At its debut, Vicente Fox, Paulo Coelho, Lisa Ling, and Fran Drescher were featured. Chopra helped create a virtual reality meditation video game, called Finding Your True Self, with his father in 2016.

In 2006, he, Sharad Devarajan, and Suresh Seetharaman co-founded Virgin Comics and convinced Sir Richard Branson to invest. In 2008, the company changed its name to Liquid Comics following management changes. Chopra co-created the Bulletproof Monk comics with Brett Lewis and R. A. Jones. Chopra also produced the 2003 film based on the series. Devarajan, Chopra, and Seetharaman established Graphic India in 2011 under the Liquid Comics name. This company focuses on the Indian youth market and the creation of characters inspired by Indian myth and legend. Peter Chernin joined the team as an investor in 2013 and is a joint owner of Graphic India.

In 2012, Chopra created, produced, and directed Decoding Deepak about his father. In 2014, Chopra hosted the talk show Help Desk on the Oprah Winfrey Network. In 2015, he was the executive producer on Kobe Bryant's Muse on Showtime. He also directed The Little Master, a documentary about Indian cricketer Sachin Tendulkar as part of ESPN's 30 for 30 series, and directed and produced I Am Giant about New York Giants wide receiver Victor Cruz.

=== Religion of Sports ===
Religion of Sports, a sports-focused media company, was founded in 2016 by Chopra, Michael Strahan, and Tom Brady. Chopra created, directed, produced, and narrated the docuseries Religion of Sports, which examines the profound influence sports can have on societies and cultures beyond entertainment value. The show's third series aired in 2018.

Religion of Sports' Why We Fight, an eight-part docuseries about opioid addiction in sports starring Zachary Wohlman, received a Sports Emmy nomination in 2018 in Outstanding Serialized Sports Documentary. This was Chopra's first Sports Emmy nomination. Also in 2018, Tom vs Time, a docuseries about Tom Brady's off-season training. The series aired on Facebook Watch. It won a Sports Emmy for Outstanding Serialized Sports Documentary in 2019. The same year, Shut Up and Dribble was nominated for Outstanding Open/Tease and Outstanding Sports Promotional Announcement at the Sports Emmys. The three-part docuseries, which aired on Showtime, was inspired by Fox News host Laura Ingraham's February 2017 comment that LeBron James and Kevin Durant should stay out of politics and "shut up and dribble". The series, produced by LeBron James and directed by Chopra, shows "attempts by NBA players to bring about social change and speak up politically" throughout the years. The first season of Greatness Code, which highlights defining moments in athletes' careers, aired in July 2020; the second season aired in May 2022. The ESPN+ series Man in the Arena: Tom Brady, which focuses on Tom Brady's career, was nominated for two Sports Emmys.

Chopra is also involved with several podcasts for Religion of Sports, including as the host for Man in the Arena: Tom Brady and Why Sports Matter (with Tom Brady and Michael Strahan). He produces Crushed, a podcast about steroids in baseball, in collaboration with PRX.

== Personal life ==
Chopra married Candice Chen c. 1993; the couple have a son. As of 2022, Chopra is based in Los Angeles.

== Works ==
=== Books and comics ===
Year	Title	Co-writer(s)	ISBN	Ref
1996	Child of the Dawn		ISBN 978-1-878424-24-2	
1998	Bulletproof Monk	Brett Lewis, R.A. Jones, Michael Avon Oeming	ISBN 978-1-582402-44-4	
2002	Familiar Strangers: Uncommon Wisdom in Unlikely Places		ISBN 978-0-385499-67-5	
2011	The Seven Spiritual Laws of Superheroes: Harnessing Our Power to Change the World	Deepak Chopra	ISBN 978-0-062059-66-6	
2011	Walking Wisdom: Three Generations, Two Dogs, and the Search for a Happy Life	Deepak Chopra	ISBN 978-1-401310-34-9	
2023	Religion of Sports: Navigating the Trials of Life Through the Games We Love	Joe Levin	ISBN 978-1-501198-09-0	

=== Filmography ===
Year	Title	Type	Director	Producer	Other	Subject	Awards	Ref
2003	Bulletproof Monk	Film		Yes		Based on the Bulletproof Monk comics by Chopra, Brett Lewis, R.A. Jones, Michael Avon Oeming	2003, Teen Choice Award nominee (Choice Movie - Drama/Action Adventure)	
2003	Soul of Healing	Film		Yes		Deepak Chopra		
2006	How to Know God	Film		Yes		Deepak Chopra		
2007	The Seven Spiritual Laws of Success	Film		Yes		The Seven Spiritual Laws of Success, Deepak Chopra		
2008	The Love Guru	Film			Actor			
2011	Seven Brothers	TV series		Yes		Based on the Seven Brothers comic by John Woo		
2012	Decoding Deepak	Documentary	Yes	Yes	Writer	Deepak Chopra	2012, IFFLA winner (Audience Awards: Best Documentary)	
2013	Help Desk	TV series		Yes	Host	Advice		
2013	Chakra: The Invincible	Film		Yes	Creator	Based on the Chakraverse series by Chopra, Devarajan, and Stan Lee		
2015	The Little Master	Documentary	Yes	Yes		Sachin Tendulkar		
2015	Kobe Bryant's Muse	Documentary	Yes	Yes		Kobe Bryant	2015, Clio bronze winner	
2015	I Am Giant	Documentary	Yes			Victor Cruz		
2016	72 Hours	Docuseries	Yes	Yes				
2016	David Ortiz: The Last Walk Off	Docuseries	Yes	Yes		David Ortiz		
2016	Finding Yourself	Docuseries	Yes			Deepak Chopra		
2016	Chakra the Invincible: The Rise of Infinitus	Film			Creator, writer	Based on the Chakraverse series by Chopra, Devarajan, and Stan Lee		
2017	Uninterrupted Presents	Docuseries		Yes				
2017	89 Blocks	Documentary		Yes		East St. Louis Senior High School Flyers	2017, Sports Emmy nominee (Outstanding Long Sports Documentary); 2018, Clio bronze winner	
2017	Tailwhip	Documentary (short)		Yes		BMX		
2018	Tom vs Time	Docuseries	Yes	Yes	Cinematographer	Tom Brady	2019, Sports Emmy winner (Outstanding Serialized Sports Documentary)	
2018	Truck is Uninterrupted	Documentary (short)		Yes				
2018	Shut Up and Dribble	Docuseries	Yes	Yes		LeBron James	2021 NAACP Image Awards nominee (Outstanding Documentary (Television)); 2019 Sports Emmys nominee (Outstanding Open/Tease; Outstanding Sports Promotional Announcement at the Sports Emmys)	
2016-2018	Religion of Sports	Docuseries	Yes	Yes	Creator, writer, narrator	Sports		
2019	Wiz Khalifa: Behind the Cam	Docuseries		Yes		Wiz Khalifa		
2019	Why We Fight	Docuseries	Yes			Zachary Wohlman, opioid addiction	2018, Sports Emmy nominee (Outstanding Serialized Sports Documentary)	
2019	Headstrong: Mental Health and Sports	Documentary		Yes		Mental health, Justise Winslow, Nathan Braaten, Hayden Hurst, Clint Malarchuk		
2019	Stephen vs. The Game	Docuseries	Yes	Yes		Stephen Curry		
2020	The Great Brady Heist	Documentary		Yes		Tom Brady		
2020	Greatness Code	Docuseries	Yes	Yes		Athletes	2021, Sports Emmy winner (Outstanding Post-Produced Graphic Design); 2021, Sports Emmy nominee (Outstanding Edited Sports Series; Outstanding Editing - Short Form)	
2021	Simone vs Herself	Docuseries	Yes	Yes		Simone Biles	2022, Sports Emmy nominee (Outstanding Documentary Series)	
2021	Passion Play: Russell Westbrook	Documentary	Yes			Russell Westbrook		
2021-2022	Man in the Arena: Tom Brady	Docuseries	Yes	Yes		Tom Brady	2022, Sports Emmy nominee (Excellent Documentary Sequence; Excellent Enhancing Lengthy-Type)	
2024	Thank You, Goodnight: The Bon Jovi Story	Docuseries	Yes	Yes		Bon Jovi	2024	
TBD	Helen Believe	Documentary		Yes		Helen Maroulis		
TBD	The Leaves	Film		Yes		The Leaves comic by Kevin J. Walsh and Ashwin Chikerur		
TBD	The Adventurers Club	TV show	Yes	Yes	Creator	Based on The Adventurers Club comic		
TBD	The Sadhu	Film		Yes	Screenwriter, creator	Based on The Sadhu comic by Chopra and Jeevan Kang		
TBD	The 36			Yes		Based on novel by Deepak Chopra		
TBD	Dinner with Deepak	Reality TV		Yes		Deepak Chopra		
