= Man in the Arena: Tom Brady =

- Genre: Documentary
- Starring: Tom Brady
- Country of origin: United States
- Original language: English
- No. of seasons: 1
- No. of episodes: 10

Production
- Executive producers: Tom Brady; Victor Buhler
- Running time: 60 minutes

Original release
- Network: ESPN+
- Release: November 16, 2021 – April 25, 2022

Man in the Arena: Tom Brady, or simply Man in the Arena, is an American sports documentary series co-produced by ESPN Films, Religion of Sports, and 199 Productions. Directed by Gotham Chopra and Erik LeDrew, the series centers on the career of Tom Brady, with particular focus on his tenure as the New England Patriots starting quarterback.

The first season of the series ran weekly on ESPN+ from November 16, 2021 through January 11, 2022, with its final episode delayed until April 25, 2022.

== Premise ==
As described by ESPN's trailer description, Man in the Arena spotlights Brady's first-hand account of his 9 Super Bowl appearances with the New England Patriots, his Super Bowl appearance with the Tampa Bay Buccaneers, being married to a supermodel, and smaller, yet pivotal moments during his career.

== Production and release ==
=== Development ===
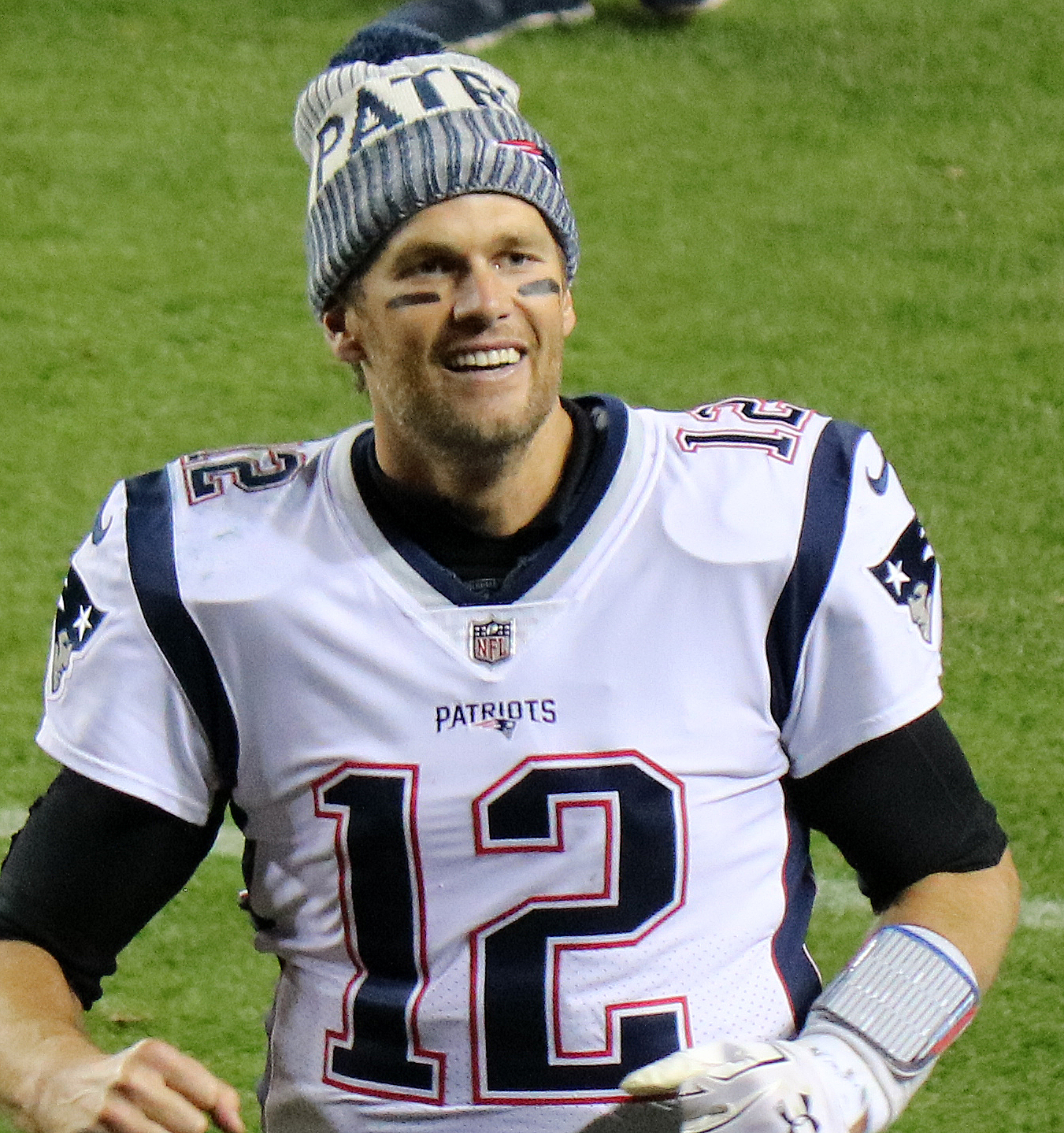
Tom Brady in 2017

Co-director Gotham Chopra previously created Tom vs Time (2018), a miniseries about Brady's off-season training regimen and home life. Following the end of Tom vs Time, Chopra stated that there were no plans to create a second season. Shortly prior to signing with the Tampa Bay Buccaneers in March 2020, Brady announced the launch of 199 Productions, a media company designed to produce original documentaries, feature films, and television series.

On May 21, 2020, ESPN released an official trailer for Man in the Arena. The Man in the Arena title is derived from a quote from one of former U.S. President Theodore Roosevelt's speeches. When announcing the series, Brady explained in a tweet:

I have quoted Theodore Roosevelt's "Man in the Arena" speech since I saw it painted on our weight room wall at UM in 1995. It's a constant reminder to ignore the noise, buckle my chinstrap, and battle through whatever comes my way.

ESPN Films co-produced the miniseries along with Chopra's "Religion of Sports" and Brady's 199 Productions company. NFL Films was also involved with the documentary's production.

Upon its announcement, many sports media publications likened the documentary to The Last Dance, which premiered on ESPN in April 2020, and centered on Michael Jordan. Chopra, however, stated: "It's not Tom Brady's Last Dance. It's not that. That may or may not exist 20 years from now, I don't know. There's this sort of immediacy to this... The premise [of The Last Dance] was telling stories about the seasons, whereas [Brady's], it does feel a little bit more real time."

Originally announced as nine-episode miniseries, a tenth episode was eventually confirmed. Each episode goes through each of Brady's Super Bowl appearance seasons, although Brady went to a tenth Super Bowl after the series went into production. Following the release of the ninth episode, Chopra stated that a tenth episode was still in production and would be released sometime in the spring of 2022. That turned out to be on April 25, 2022.

=== Release ===
The series' first nine episodes ran weekly from November 16, 2021 to January 11, 2022. The series' tenth episode was slated to be released on January 19, but was delayed until April 25 because Brady was considering retirement.

== Episodes ==
| No. | Title | Original release date |
|---|---|---|
| 1 | "In the Arena" | November 16, 2021 |
In 2001, Tom Brady fills-in as the Patriots' starting quarterback after Drew Bledsoe suffers an injury, and leads the Patriots to their first franchise championship with a victory over the St. Louis Rams in Super Bowl XXXVI. Interviewed guests: Drew Bledsoe and Willie McGinest
| 2 | "The Toughest Things" | November 23, 2021 |
In 2003, the Patriots bounce back from a difficult 2002 season and Brady helps lead the team to a victory over the Carolina Panthers in Super Bowl XXXVIII. Interviewed guests: Lawyer Milloy and Rodney Harrison
| 3 | "The Edge" | November 30, 2021 |
In 2004, Brady leads the Patriots to back-to-back Super Bowl victories with a win over the Philadelphia Eagles in Super Bowl XXXIX. Interviewed guests: Mike Vrabel and Tedy Bruschi
| 4 | "Goliaths" | December 7, 2021 |
In 2007, the Patriots' offense reaches new heights after wide receiver Randy Moss joins the team. While Brady and the Patriots finish the regular season undefeated, they endure a loss to the New York Giants in Super Bowl XLII. Interviewed guests: Randy Moss and Michael Strahan
| 5 | "No Guarantees" | December 14, 2021 |
In 2011, Brady balances his on-field demands, as he leads the Patriots to an appearance in Super Bowl XLVI (another loss to the New York Giants, with his home life responsibilities as a husband and father. Interviewed guests: Bill O'Brien, Gisele Bündchen, and Wes Welker
| 6 | "Stop the Bleeding" | December 21, 2021 |
In 2014, Brady finds himself at the center of the Deflategate controversy as he helps lead the Patriots to a victory over the Seattle Seahawks in Super Bowl XLIX. Interviewed guests: Vince Wilfork and Richard Sherman
| 7 | "Surrender" | December 28, 2021 |
In 2016, Brady goes through personal challenges, while on the field, he helps lead the Patriots to a comeback Super Bowl LI victory over the Atlanta Falcons. Interviewed guests: Julie, Maureen, and Nancy Brady
| 8 | "Nobody's Business" | January 4, 2022 |
In 2017, Brady goes through one of the more grueling seasons of his career, while the Patriots end the season with a loss to the Philadelphia Eagles in Super Bowl LII. Interviewed guests: Rob Gronkowski and Alex Guerrero
| 9 | "Maybe" | January 11, 2022 |
In 2018, the Patriots make their third consecutive Super Bowl trip and defeated the Los Angeles Rams in Super Bowl LIII. Interviewed guest: Julian Edelman
| 10 | "The Wheel" | April 25, 2022 |
In 2020, Tom Brady leaves New England to start a new chapter with the Tampa Bay Buccaneers and leading them to a victory over the Kansas City Chiefs in Super Bowl LV, and reflects on his hopes of living up to the example set by his hero, his father.

== Reception ==
Sally Jenkins, a columnist for The Washington Post commented on the series, writing: "The documentary is worth watching if only to study how Brady creates equanimity for himself. It's his attempt to overdub the noise, 'the Real Housewives conversation,' as he puts it."
