= Drunkard's Walk =

Drunkard's Walk may refer to:

- Drunkard's Walk (novel), a 1960 science fiction novel by Frederik Pohl
- Drunkard's walk, a patchwork pattern made up of squares of fabric with a quarter circle of contrasting fabric in one corner
- Drunkard's walk, a type of random walk in which termination conditions lead to a biased ending state
- The Drunkard's Walk, a 2008 popular science book by Leonard Mlodinow
