= You Are the Universe (book) =

2017 book by Deepak Chopra and Menas Kafatos

You Are the Universe: Discovering Your Cosmic Self and Why It Matters
- Book cover of You Are the Universe
- Author: Deepak Chopra; Menas Kafatos
- Language: English
- Subject: Science philosophy Spirituality
- Publisher: Harmony
- Publication date: February 7, 2017
- Publication place: United States
- ISBN: 978-0-307-88916-4

You Are the Universe: Discovering Your Cosmic Self and Why It Matters is a philosophy book co-written by Deepak Chopra and Menas Kafatos. The book delves into questions pertaining to existence, human existence, consciousness, reality and perception. It was published on February 7, 2017, and became a New York Times best-seller.

== Synopsis ==
You Are the Universe is a philosophical work which attempts to give answers to questions pertaining to the origin of the universe, time, space, matter and the origin and meaning of consciousness and the marrying of science and spirituality in daily lives.

The book challenges the assumption that consciousness is a byproduct of matter claiming that matter is actually an experience in consciousness. The book proposes that the entire universe, as experienced by human beings, is a "human construct in consciousness."

The book delves into the two most prominent questions in science which are:

- What is the universe made of?
- What is the biological basis of consciousness?

The book makes use of analogies, to make certain philosophical points, such as equating the chance of DNA structure forming the building blocks of life emerging from the chaos that existed after the Big Bang with 100 monkeys with 100 typewriters eventually producing the complete works of Shakespeare, or the possibility of a whirlwind blowing through an aircraft spare parts yard and putting together a functional jumbo jet.

== Critical reception ==
Professor of Neurology at Harvard University, Rudolph E. Tanzi, describes the book as "A riveting and absolutely fascinating adventure that will blow your mind wide open!".

Constance Scharff of the New York Journal of Books wrote that "what is most compelling about You Are the Universe: Discovering Your Cosmic Self and Why It Matters is that if you can hold the ideas set out in its pages as at least possible, you may find your capacity to change your life will be catapulted off the charts. If the universe is indeed human and our minds have the same type of creative capacity as the universe or at least parts of the universe, we have the ability to change our lives in profound ways."

Professor of physics Sadri Hassani reviewed You are the Universe for Skeptical Inquirer and said "Every chapter... is headed by a question followed by a long discussion of (sometimes irrelevant) topics mostly from physics but also from neuroanatomy. ... The answer to every chapter heading boils down to two words: conscious universe". And about the authors, Hassani says "It baffles the mind how a medical doctor and a computational physicist have been able to solve puzzles that more than 600 Nobel laureates in physics, chemistry, and physiology and medicine have been unable to solve in the past 117 years!".
