= Chakra: The Invincible =

2013 television film

- Genre: Action/Adventure; Science fiction
- Created by: Stan Lee; Sharad Devarajan; Gotham Chopra
- Written by: Stan Lee; Sharad Devarajan; Ashwin Pande; Scott Peterson
- Directed by: Sharad Devarajan
- Voices of: Dana Simmone; Aditi Narayanan; Dave Simmons; Gino Bori; Jim O'Brien; Jacquie Floyd; Dion Clark; Joel Porter; Stan Lee; Dominic Chiudoni; Katie Terpstra
- Theme music composer: Siddharth Coutto
- Composers: Dominic Chiudoni; Pierre Gerwig Langer; Lynn Publishing; Mark John Petrie
- Country of origin: India
- Original languages: Hindi; English

Production
- Executive producers: Stan Lee; Sharad Devarajan; Gill Champion; Gotham Chopra; Uttam Pal Singh
- Producer: Nick Timmerman
- Editor: Ryan Casebolt
- Running time: 65 minutes
- Production companies: Graphic India; POW! Entertainment; Cartoon Network India

Original release
- Network: Cartoon Network (India)
- Release: 30 November 2013

Chakra: The Invincible is an Indian animated superhero film based on the main character created by Stan Lee, with Sharad Devarajan and Gotham Chopra. It aired in English and Hindi. The movie is produced by Graphic India and POW! Entertainment, and was premiered on Cartoon Network on 30 November 2013.

== Plot ==
The movie features Raju Rai, a young Indian boy living in Mumbai, India. Raju's mentor, the scientist Dr. Singh, develops a technological suit that weaponizes all the Chakras in the body. Raju uses his powers to be a superhero and vows to use the suit to protect and serve Mumbai as he battles super-villains and beats them up badly.

== Merchandising ==
Stan Lee, in association with Graphic India and POW! Entertainment, released comic books, games and toys based on the superhero Chakra.

== Sequels ==
Two sequels, entitled Chakra: The Rise of Infinitus and Chakra: The Revenge of Magnus Flux, aired on Toonami on 25 September 2016 and 15 February 2017 respectively.
