= The Seven Spiritual Laws of Superheroes =

2011 book about spirituality

The Seven Spiritual Laws of Superheroes: Harnessing Our Power to Change the World
- Cover of the book
- Author: Deepak Chopra, Gotham Chopra
- Language: English
- Publisher: HarperOne
- Publication date: 2011
- Pages: 167
- ISBN: 978-0-062-05966-6
- Website: deepakchoprabook.com/superheroes (archived)

The Seven Spiritual Laws of Superheroes: Harnessing Our Power to Change the World is a 2011 book written by Deepak Chopra and his son Gotham Chopra.

== Summary ==
The book relates modern-day superheroes to spirituality. Superheroes like Superman and Batman are described to be metaphors that we can learn from to assist in real-life challenges. Throughout the book, seven laws are explained. These laws aim to help increase happiness, achieve balance, and find purpose in our lives.

== Media appearances ==
Deepak Chopra discussed this book at the 2006 San Diego Comic-Con. He explained how superheroes are modern mythology and their powers and abilities express our subconscious. Deepak and Gotham Chopra both discussed the book at the 2011 San Diego Comic-Con.
