= Leonard Mlodinow =

American physicist, author and screenwriter (born 1954)

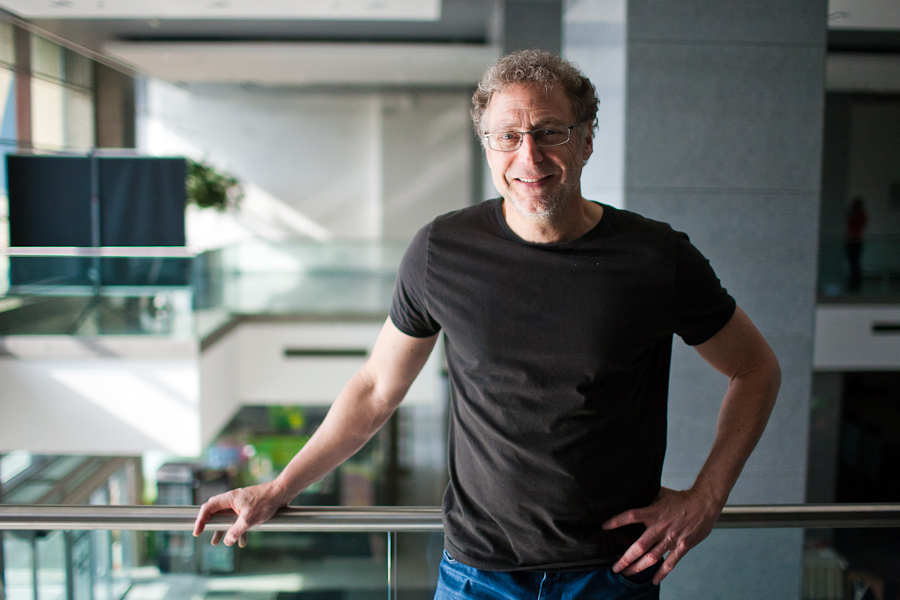
- Born: 26 November 1954 (age 71); Chicago, Illinois
- Citizenship: American
- Education: Brandeis University; University of California, Berkeley
- Scientific career
- Fields: Mathematical physics
- Workplaces: Max Planck Institute for Physics; California Institute of Technology
- Doctoral advisor: Eyvind Wichmann

Leonard Mlodinow (born November 26, 1954) is an American theoretical physicist and mathematician, screenwriter and author. In physics, he is known for his work on the large N expansion, a method of approximating the spectrum of atoms based on the consideration of an infinite-dimensional version of the problem, and for his work on the quantum theory of light inside dielectrics.

Mlodinow has also written books for the general public, five of which have been New York Times best-sellers, including The Drunkard's Walk: How Randomness Rules Our Lives, which was chosen as a New York Times notable book, and short-listed for the Royal Society Science Book Prize; The Grand Design, co-authored with Stephen Hawking, which said that invoking God is not necessary to explain the origins of the universe; War of the Worldviews, co-authored with Deepak Chopra; and Subliminal: How Your Unconscious Mind Rules Your Behavior, which won the 2013 PEN/E. O. Wilson Literary Science Writing Award. He also makes public lectures and media appearances on programs including Morning Joe and Through the Wormhole, and debated Deepak Chopra on ABC's Nightline.

== Biography ==
Mlodinow was born in Chicago, Illinois, to Jewish parents who were both Holocaust survivors. His father, who spent more than a year in the Buchenwald concentration camp, had been a leader in the Jewish resistance in his hometown of Częstochowa, in Nazi German-occupied Poland.

As a child, Mlodinow was interested in both mathematics and chemistry; while in high school, he was tutored in organic chemistry by a professor from the University of Illinois. He said in his book Feynman's Rainbow that his interest turned to physics during a semester he took off from college to spend on a kibbutz in Israel, during which he had little to do at night besides reading The Feynman Lectures on Physics, which was one of the few English books he found in the kibbutz library.

Mlodinow completed his doctorate at the University of California, Berkeley. In his PhD dissertation he developed a new type of perturbation theory for nonrelativistic quantum mechanics, based upon solving the problem in infinite dimensions, and then correcting for the fact that we live in three. The method has become the basis of the 1/d expansion used by theoretical chemists. He has also done pioneering and innovative work in the quantum theory of nonlinear optics. The central problem of quantum nonlinear optics is how to quantize a dielectric that, as well as the usual homogeneities and anisotropy, can also have nonlinearities and dispersion, and earlier attempts in this direction, while incorporating the known linear theory, had not fully reproduced the nonlinear equations.

In 1981, Mlodinow joined the faculty at Caltech. Later, he was named an Alexander von Humboldt Fellow and worked at the Max Planck Institute for Physics and Astrophysics in Munich, Germany. In 1986, Mlodinow left full-time academia to begin a writing career. In addition to his books, he wrote many episodes for television series including Star Trek: The Next Generation and MacGyver, created computer games with director Steven Spielberg and actor Robin Williams, and wrote the screenplay for the 2009 film Beyond the Horizon. He continued to conduct research in theoretical physics, and again joined the faculty of Caltech in 2005, leaving in 2013. His latest work in physics concerns the arrow of time, quantum decoherence, and the relation between discrete quantum random walks and the relativistic equations of quantum theory.

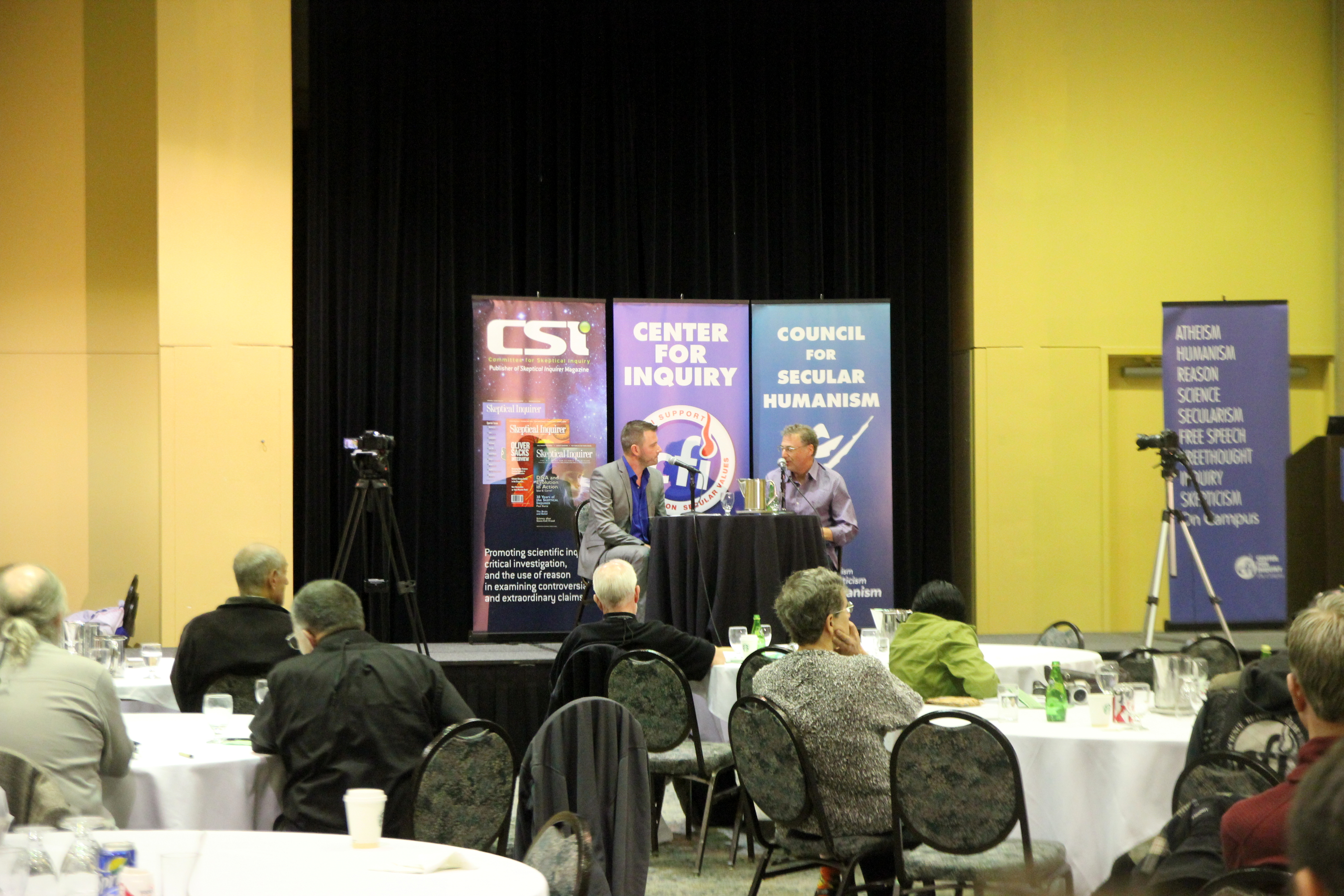
Point of Inquiry host Josh Zepps interviews Mlodinow – CFI Summit – 2013.

== Bibliography ==
=== Books ===
- Euclid's Window: The Story of Geometry from Parallel Lines to Hyperspace (2001) (ISBN 0-684-86523-8) is a work on popular science that chronicles the idea of curved space and the history of geometry.
- Feynman's Rainbow: A Search for Beauty in Physics and in Life (2003) (as published in US) (ISBN 0-446-53045-X), is about his relationship with Richard Feynman and Richard Feynman's brilliance, during his post-doctoral years in Caltech, in the early eighties. The book offers an insight into Feynman's attitude towards physics and life, his relationship with Murray Gell-Mann and the rise of String Theory.
- A Briefer History of Time (2005) (ISBN 0-553-80436-7), with Stephen Hawking.
- The Drunkard's Walk: How Randomness Rules Our Lives (2008) (ISBN 0-375-42404-0), deals with randomness and people's inability to take it into account in their daily lives. The book was a "NY Times notable book of the year".
- The Grand Design (2010) (ISBN 0-553-80537-1) with Stephen Hawking. This book argues that invoking God is not necessary to explain the origins of the universe. It became a No. 1 New York Times bestseller.
- The War of the Worldviews (2011) (ISBN 978-0-307-88688-0) with Deepak Chopra. From their contrasting scientific and spiritual perspectives, the two authors answer the big questions about the universe, consciousness, life, and God.
- Subliminal: How Your Unconscious Mind Rules Your Behavior (2012) (ISBN 0-307-37821-7) Describes how things that we think are conscious, freely made choices, are in fact governed by our subconscious.
- The Upright Thinkers: The Human Journey from Living in Trees to Understanding the Cosmos (2015) (ISBN 978-0-30790-823-0) A history of human progress, from our time on the African savannah through the invention of modern quantum physics..
- Elastic: Flexible Thinking in a Time of Change (2018) (ISBN 1-101-87092-3) A new look at the neuroscience of change—and how elastic thinking can help us thrive in a world changing faster than ever before.
- Stephen Hawking: A Memoir of Friendship and Physics (2020) (ISBN 978-1524748685)
- Emotional: How Feelings Shape Our Thinking (2022) (ISBN 978-1-5247-4759-6)

=== Children's books ===
- The Kids of Einstein Elementary: Titanic Cat, co-authored with Matt Costello and Josh Nash (2004) (ISBN 0-439-53774-6)
- The Kids of Einstein Elementary: The Last Dinosaur, co-authored with Matt Costello and Josh Nash (2004) (ISBN 0-439-53773-8)

=== Articles ===
- Mlodinow, Leonard. "Meet Hollywood's Latest Genius." Los Angeles Times (July 2, 2006).
- Mlodinow, Leonard. "The Triumph of the Random," Was Joe Di Maggio's hitting streak a fluke?" Wall Street Journal (July 16, 2009).
- Mlodinow, Leonard. "A hint of hype, a taste of illusion." Wall Street Journal (November 20, 2009).
- Hawking, Stephen, and Leonard Mlodinow. "Why God did not create the universe." Wall Street Journal (September 4—5, 2010) W 3 (2010).
- Hawking, Stephen, and Leonard Mlodinow. "The (elusive) theory of everything." Scientific American 303.4 (2010): 68–71.
- Mlodinow, Leonard. "Physics: Fundamental Feynman." Nature 471 (2011), 296–297.
- Mlodinow, Leonard. "A Facial Theory of Politics." New York Times (April 22, 2012): 58.
- Mlodinow, Leonard. "In Hollywood, Theories of Infinite Dimensions." New York Times (June 3, 2012): 58.
- Mlodinow, Leonard. "Most of Us are Biased After All." New York Times (April 4, 2013): 58.
- Mlodinow, Leonard. "Love and Math: The Heart of Hidden Reality." New York Times (October 25, 2013): 15.
- Mlodinow, Leonard. "It is, in Fact, Rocket Science," New York Times (May 15, 2015): 23.
- Mlodinow, Leonard. "Mindware and Superforecasting." New York Times (October 15, 2015): 23.

== Awards and honors ==
- 2008 Robert P. Balles Prize for Critical Thinking for his book The Drunkard's Walk: How Randomness Rules our Lives awarded by the Committee for Skeptical Inquiry (CSICOP)
- 2010 Liber Press Award for the Popularization of Science
- 2013 PEN/E. O. Wilson Literary Science Writing Award, Subliminal
