= War of the Worldviews =

2011 book by Deepak Chopra and Leonard Mlodinow

- Authors: Deepak Chopra; Leonard Mlodinow
- Language: English
- Subjects: Science, spirituality
- Publisher: Harmony Books
- Publication date: 2011
- Publication place: United Kingdom
- Media type: Print (Paperback)
- Pages: 316
- ISBN: 978-0-307-88688-0
- OCLC: 708648095
- Dewey Decimal: 501

War of the Worldviews: Science vs. Spirituality is a book written by Deepak Chopra and Leonard Mlodinow, which was published in 2011, and is a debate between views on science and spirituality.

== Premise ==
The book is written as a series of essays by each author on a mutually-agreed-upon list of 18 questions. The science worldview is represented by Mlodinow and the spirituality worldview is represented by Chopra. Each presents his side which is followed by the other person's rebuttal.

== Overall ==
Mlodinow suggests that "the universe operates according to laws of physics while acknowledging that science does not address why the laws exist or how they arise". Chopra says that "the laws of nature as well as mathematics share the same source as human consciousness".

== See also ==
- The Tao of Physics
