= Sanjiv Chopra =

American medical academic

- Born: 9 September 1949 (age 77); Pune, Bombay State, India
- Education: St. Columba's School, Delhi; Hans Raj College; New Delhi; All India Institute of Medical Sciences (AIIMS)
- Occupations: Professor of Medicine, former academic for Continuing Medical Education at Harvard Medical School, writer
- Spouse: Amita Rani Chopra
- Children: 3
- Relatives: Deepak Chopra (brother); Mallika Chopra (niece); Gotham Chopra (nephew)
- Website: sanjivchopra.com

Sanjiv Chopra (born 9 September 1949) is an Indian-born American professor of medicine at Harvard Medical School and serves as the Marshall Wolf Distinguished Clinician Educator at Brigham and Women’s Hospital. He previously served as Faculty Dean for Continuing Medical Education at Harvard Medical School for twelve years.

Chopra is the editor-in-chief of the Hepatology section of UpToDate, an electronic clinical decision support resource used by physicians worldwide.

== Early life and education ==
Sanjiv Chopra graduated from St. Columba's School, Delhi in 1964. He did his premedical qualification at Hansraj College, Delhi University. He graduated from Medical School from the All India Institute of Medical Sciences (AIIMS). In 1972 he came to the United States for post-graduate training. After a year of Internship in Internal Medicine in New Jersey, he moved to Boston in 1973. Following his residency, he completed a fellowship in Gastroenterology and Hepatology, from 1975 - 1977. He has been on the faculty of Harvard Medical School since 1979.

== Medical and academic career ==
Chopra is a professor of medicine at Harvard Medical School. He served as Faculty Dean for Continuing Medical Education at Harvard Medical School for twelve years and is affiliated with Brigham and Women’s Hospital, where he holds the title of Marshall Wolf Distinguished Clinician Educator.

== Publications ==
Chopra has authored or co-authored books:

- Dr. Chopra Says: Medical Facts and Myths Everyone Should Know (with Allan Lotvin, MD)
- Live Better, Live Longer
- Leadership by Example: The Ten Key Principles of All Great Leaders
- Brotherhood: Dharma, Destiny, and the American Dream (with Deepak Chopra, 2013)
- The Big Five: Five Simple Things You Can Do to Live a Longer, Healthier Life
- The Two Most Important Days… (with Gina Vild, 2017)
- Coffee: The Magical Elixir
- Conquer Your Diabetes (with Martin Abrahamson)
- Ignite the Fire Within (with Rick Najera)
- Letters to a Young Doctor (with Pankaj Vij)
- From Splintered to Centered: The Seven Dimensions for Navigating Your Soul by Sanjiv Chopra and Loren Michaels Harris- In Press

== Awards and honors ==
- 1985 – George W. Thorn Award for Outstanding Contribution to Clinical Education, Brigham and Women’s Hospital
- 1991 – Excellence in Teaching Award, Harvard Medical School (Graduating Class of 1991)
- 1995 – Robert S. Stone Award for Excellence in Teaching
- 2003 – American Gastroenterological Association Distinguished Educator Award
- 2009 – Elected Master of the American College of Physicians (MACP)
- 2012 – Ellis Island Medal of Honor
- 2026 – Carnegie Foundation: Great American Great Immigrant
