= The Seven Spiritual Laws of Success =

1994 self-help book by Deepak Chopra

The Seven Spiritual Laws of Success – A Practical Guide to the Fulfillment of Your Dreams
- Author: Deepak Chopra
- Cover artist: Unknown, Detail of Asavari Ragini painting, from the Subimperial Mughal (c. 1625)
- Language: English
- Subject: Hinduist and spiritualistic concepts
- Genre: self-help
- Published: 1994
- Publication place: United States
- Pages: 118
- ISBN: 978-1878424112
- OCLC: 31074972
- Dewey Decimal: 650.1
- LC Class: HF5386 .C5475 1994

The Seven Spiritual Laws of Success – A Practical Guide to the Fulfillment of Your Dreams is a 1994 self-help, pocket-sized book by Deepak Chopra, published originally by New World Library, freely inspired in Hinduist and spiritualistic concepts, which preaches the idea that personal success is not the outcome of hard work, precise plans or a driving ambition, but rather of understanding our basic nature as human beings and how to follow the laws of nature. According to the book, when we comprehend and apply these laws in our lives, everything we want can be created, “because the same laws that nature uses to create a forest, a star, or a human body can also bring about the fulfillment of our deepest desires”.

== Summary ==
1. The Law of Pure Potentiality: Take time to be silent, to just BE. Meditate for 30 minutes twice a day. Silently witness the intelligence within every living thing. Practice non-judgment. Mantra - Om Bhavam Namah

2. The Law of Giving: Today, bring whoever you encounter a gift, a compliment, or a flower. Gratefully receive gifts. Keep wealth circulating by giving and receiving care, affection, appreciation and love. Mantra - Om Vardhanam Namah

3. The Law of Karma: Every action generates a force of energy that returns to us in like kind. Choosing actions that bring happiness and success to others ensures the flow of happiness and success to you. Mantra - Om Kriyam Namah

4. The Law of Least Effort: Accept people, situations, and events as they occur. Take responsibility for your situation and for all events seen as problems. Relinquish the need to defend your point of view. Mantra - Om Daksham Namah

5. The Law of Intention and Desire: Inherent in every intention and desire is the mechanics for its fulfillment. Make a list of desires. Trust that when things don’t seem to go your way, there is a reason. Mantra - Om Ritam Namah

6. The Law of Detachment: Allow yourself and others the freedom to be who they are. Do not force solutions—allow solutions to spontaneously emerge. Uncertainty is essential, and your path to freedom. Mantra - Om Anandham Namah

7. The Law of Dharma: We have taken manifestation in physical form to fulfill a purpose. Mantra - Om Varunam Namah

== Reception ==
The book appeared in the top 10 list of the 1995 New York Times.

== See also ==
- Law of Attraction
- The Secret (film)
