= Zachary Wohlman =

American boxer (1988–2021)

Personal information
- Nickname: Kid Yamaka
- Nationality: (United States) American
- Born: May 23, 1988 San Fernando Valley, Los Angeles, California, U.S.
- Died: February 14, 2021 (aged 32)
- Height: 5 ft 8 in (1.73 m)
- Weight: Welterweight

Boxing career
- Stance: Southpaw

Boxing record
- Total fights: 15
- Wins: 10
- Losses: 3
- Draws: 2

Zachary Wohlman, also known as Kid Yamaka (Note: A phonetic spelling of "yarmulke," the skullcap worn by Jews while praying) (May 23, 1988 – February 14, 2021), was an American boxer in the Welterweight division, who was an amateur and later a professional. Wohlman, a late-comer to the sport, went from juvenile delinquency to becoming the 2010 winner of the Los Angeles Golden Gloves Tournament. On February 15, 2021, it was announced that Wolhman had died at the age of 32.

He was trained by International Boxing Hall of Famer Freddie Roach, with whom he started training in 2008, and trainer Eric Brown. His record as of December 2017 was 10–3–2. He went on to help at risk youth, joining Ring of Hope Boxing.

== Early life ==
Zachary Wohlman was Jewish, and was born in the San Fernando Valley of Los Angeles to David Wohlman and his wife, a beautician. He lived in Northridge, Reseda, and Woodland Hills, California.

Wohlman’s early life was marked by a lack of family structure, fights in school, military school in Texas on the Mexico border where he had his first taste of boxing, drugs, and “behind-the-barn” amateur boxing matches across the border in Mexico. He was sent to Sylmar Juvenile Detention at age 16, worked on an oil rig in San Jose to support himself at age 17, and had brushes with the criminal justice system. He said: "If you’re getting hit in the face for a living, something fucked up happened [in your life]".

At the age of 20, he had a bar mitzvah and started attending Shabbat Friday night dinners each week, and said "I got that sense of family and community that I didn’t grow up with." He sported many tattoos, including a Star of David across his stomach, and wore a Star of David around his neck. He attended weekly Jewish services, and his nickname "Yamaka" referred to his Jewish heritage.

== Career ==
=== Amateur ===
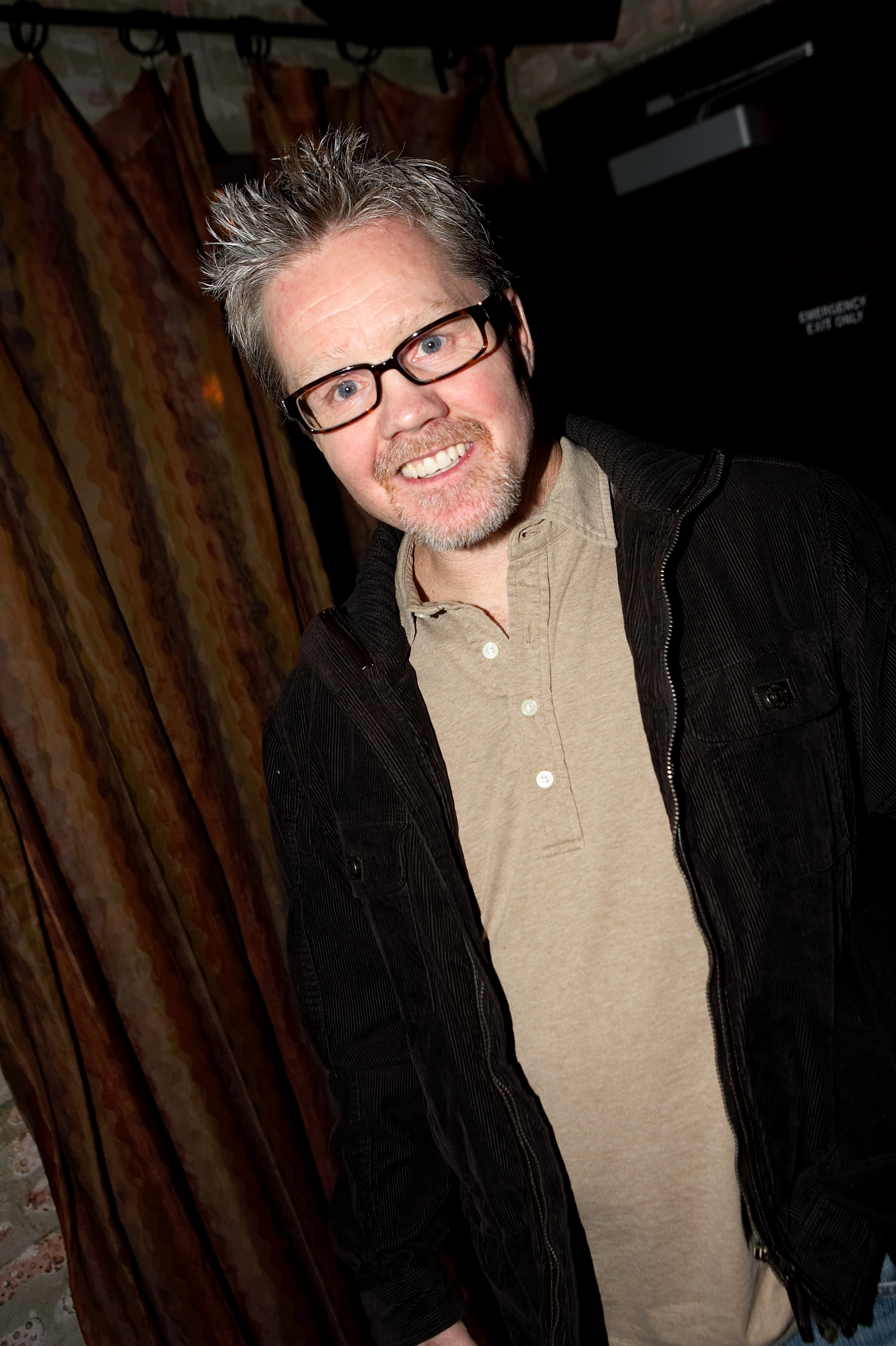
Freddie Roach

He was the first amateur boxer taken on by International Boxing Hall of Famer Freddie Roach, with whom he started training in 2008. Roach and Eric Brown trained him during his professional career. Brown says of him:

I've had him box with world champions and contenders, and Zac's held his own with all of them. He's got mad skills, heart, determination and an eagerness to learn.

He won the California Golden Gloves Championship in 2010. His amateur record was 18–4.

=== Professional ===
He made his professional boxing debut on December 1, 2011, at a packed Fight Night Club at Club Nokia in downtown Los Angeles, aired on Fox Sports Net, winning by unanimous decision. On March 31 Wohlman scored his first knockout, to improve his record to 3–0 (1 KO), over Clifford McPherson, when McPherson couldn’t continue due to an injured hand.

His performance on July 12, 2012, in Hollywood brought his record up to 4–0 and led to him being on the cover of LA Weekly. In February 2014 he defeated Luis Hernandez at the Florentine Gardens in Hollywood, California, in a four-round decision to bring his record to 7–1–1.

== Movies ==
Wohlman appeared in the movies Golden Boy Boxing (2009), Boxer (2011), and Xander Cohen (2012). He also worked as a commentator for Bash Boxing, alongside Jonathan King and Chris Strait

== Personal life ==
Wohlman was married to Serafina until his death. He died suddenly on February 14, 2021, in a gas station bathroom, at the age of 32.

== Professional boxing record ==
Source: BoxRec

14 fights	10 wins	2 losses
By knockout	2	1
By decision	8	1
Draws	2	

No.	Result	Record	Opponent	Type	Round	Date	Location	Notes
14	Draw	10-2-2	(United States) Matt Murphy	D	4 (4)	2017-06-22	Exchange LA, Los Angeles, California, United States	
13	Win	10–2-1	(Mexico) Roman Mendez	TKO	1	2017-02-24	Salon Mezzanine, Tijuana, Baja California, Mexico	
12	Win	9–2-1	(United States) Lionel Jimenez	UD	4 (4)	2016-03-12	Marriott Convention Center, Burbank, California, United States	
11	Loss	8–2-1	(United States) Paul Velarde	UD	6 (6)	2014-08-09	Civic Auditorium, Glendale, California, United States	
10	Win	8–1-1	(United States) Eddie Cordova	UD	4 (4)	2014-05-17	Forum, Inglewood, California, United States	
9	Win	7–1-1	(United States) Luis Hernandez	MD	4 (4)	2014-02-06	Florentine Gardens, Hollywood, California, United States	
8	Win	6–1-1	(Canada) Steve Conkin	UD	4 (4)	2013-11-14	Florentine Gardens, Hollywood, California, United States	
7	Win	5–1-1	(United States) Omar Avelar	UD	4 (4)	2013-07-13	Hollywood Park Casino, Inglewood, California, United States	
6	Loss	4–1-1	(United States) Alonso Loeza	TKO	4	2012-11-10	Staples Center, Los Angeles, California, United States	
5	Draw	4–0-1	(United States) Jesus Vallejo	D	3	2012-09-20	Florentine Gardens, Hollywood, California, United States	
4	Win	4–0	(United States) Jose Martell	UD	4 (4)	2012-07-12	Florentine Gardens, Hollywood, California, United States	
3	Win	3–0	(United States) Clifford McPherson	TKO	1	2012-03-31	Warner Center Marriott in Woodland Hills, California, United States	
2	Win	2–0	(United States) Tatsuro Irie	UD	4 (4)	2012-01-21	Warner Center Marriott in Woodland Hills, California, United States	
1	Win	1–0	(United States) Ricardo Malfavon	UD	4 (4)	2011-12-01	Club Nokia in Los Angeles, California, United States	Professional debut.
