= The Drunkard's Walk =

2008 book by Leonard Mlodonow

The Drunkard's Walk: How Randomness Rules Our Lives
- Author: Leonard Mlodinow
- Language: English
- Subject: Randomness, probability
- Genre: Non-fiction
- Published: 2008 (Pantheon Books)
- Publication place: United States
- Pages: 272 pp.
- ISBN: 978-0-375-42404-5
- Dewey Decimal: 519.2-dc22 2007042507
- LC Class: QA273.M63 2008

The Drunkard's Walk: How Randomness Rules Our Lives is a 2008 popular science book by American physicist and author Leonard Mlodinow, which became a New York Times bestseller and a New York Times notable book.

== Overview ==
The Drunkard's Walk discusses the role of randomness in everyday events, and the cognitive biases that lead people to misinterpret random events and stochastic processes. The title refers to a certain type of random walk, a mathematical process in which one or more variables change value under a series of random steps. Mlodinow discusses the contributions of mathematical heavyweights Jacob Bernoulli, Pierre-Simon Laplace, and Blaise Pascal, and introduces basic statistical concepts such as regression toward the mean and the law of large numbers, while discussing the role of probability in examples from wine ratings and school grades to political polls.

== Reception ==
In 2008 the Committee for Skeptical Inquiry (CSICOP) awarded Mlodinow the Robert P. Balles Prize for Critical Thinking for the book.
