= Tom vs Time =

- Genre: Documentary
- Created by: Gotham Chopra
- Directed by: Gotham Chopra
- Starring: Tom Brady; Gisele Bündchen
- Composers: Antonio Pinto; Ed Côrtes
- Country of origin: United States
- Original language: English
- No. of seasons: 1
- No. of episodes: 6

Production
- Executive producers: Gotham Chopra; Ameeth Sankaran; Chris Uettwiller; Martin Desmond Roe
- Producers: Nicolas Emiliani; Erik LeDrew
- Editor: Brady Hammes
- Running time: 14–21 minutes
- Production companies: Dirty Robber; Religion of Sports

Original release
- Network: Facebook Watch
- Release: January 25 – March 12, 2018

Tom vs Time is an American documentary web series created by Gotham Chopra that was released from January 25 to March 12, 2018 on Facebook Watch. The six-episode series follows New England Patriots quarterback Tom Brady and provides an intimate look at his off-season training regimen as well as his home life spent with wife Gisele Bündchen and their children.

== Premise ==
Tom vs Time was filmed during the Patriots 2017 season and provides "an intimate look at Brady’s home life, including his two children with wife Gisele Bündchen."

== Production ==
=== Development ===
On January 9, 2018, it was announced that Facebook Watch had given a series order to Tom vs Time, a new docuseries starring football quarterback Tom Brady. The series was created by Gotham Chopra who previously worked with Brady on Audience Network's Religion of Sports series. Brady granted Chopra extensive access to his life. It was announced that episodes are set to include footage shot at Brady's Brookline, Massachusetts home, with his children and wife, Gisele Bündchen, on family retreats to Costa Rica, on a trip to Montana (with teammates Julian Edelman and Danny Amendola), on a summer tour of China with his son Jack, and in the car during Brady’s commute to and from work in Foxborough, Massachusetts.

Following the Patriots' loss to the Philadelphia Eagles in Super Bowl LII, the release of the series finale was delayed. Chopra went on to explain that the episode had originally been "tied to the Pats winning the Super Bowl" and that following their defeat the episode had to be redeveloped. The episode was finally released on March 12, 2018.

=== Marketing ===
Simultaneously with the initial series announcement, Facebook released a trailer for the first season of the show.

=== Potential renewal ===
Chopra has indicated that there are currently no plans for any subsequent season. However, he considers it a possibility if "something is dramatically different." He went on to say that if Brady's circumstances changed or the production team came up with a new, worthwhile idea then another season could happen but that they would not produce one "just because."

== Episodes ==
No.	Title	Original release date
1	"The Physical Game"	January 25, 2018
Following the Patriots' victory at Super Bowl LI, Tom Brady looks towards the next season and demonstrates the unique and well honed training process he undergoes during the offseason.
2	"The Mental Game"	January 28, 2018
Brady explains how football is just as much a mental game for him as it is a physical one. And despite all of his offseason preparation, the Patriots narrowly lose their fourth game of the 2017 season. But Brady explains how having his family at home waiting for him and having another game the following week does not allow him time to dwell on a loss.
3	"The Social Game"	January 30, 2018
Brady takes some of his closest teammates to Yellowstone National Park for a brotherhood bonding experience aka “Gladiator Camp.” Even on these vacations, he and his teammates find themselves continuing to train.
4	"The Emotional Game"	February 1, 2018
5	"The Spiritual Game"	February 4, 2018
6	"The End Game"	March 12, 2018

== See also ==
- List of original programs distributed by Facebook Watch
