= Boston Regional Medical Center =

Coordinates: 42.4518°N 71.0891°W

- Seventh-day Adventist Church
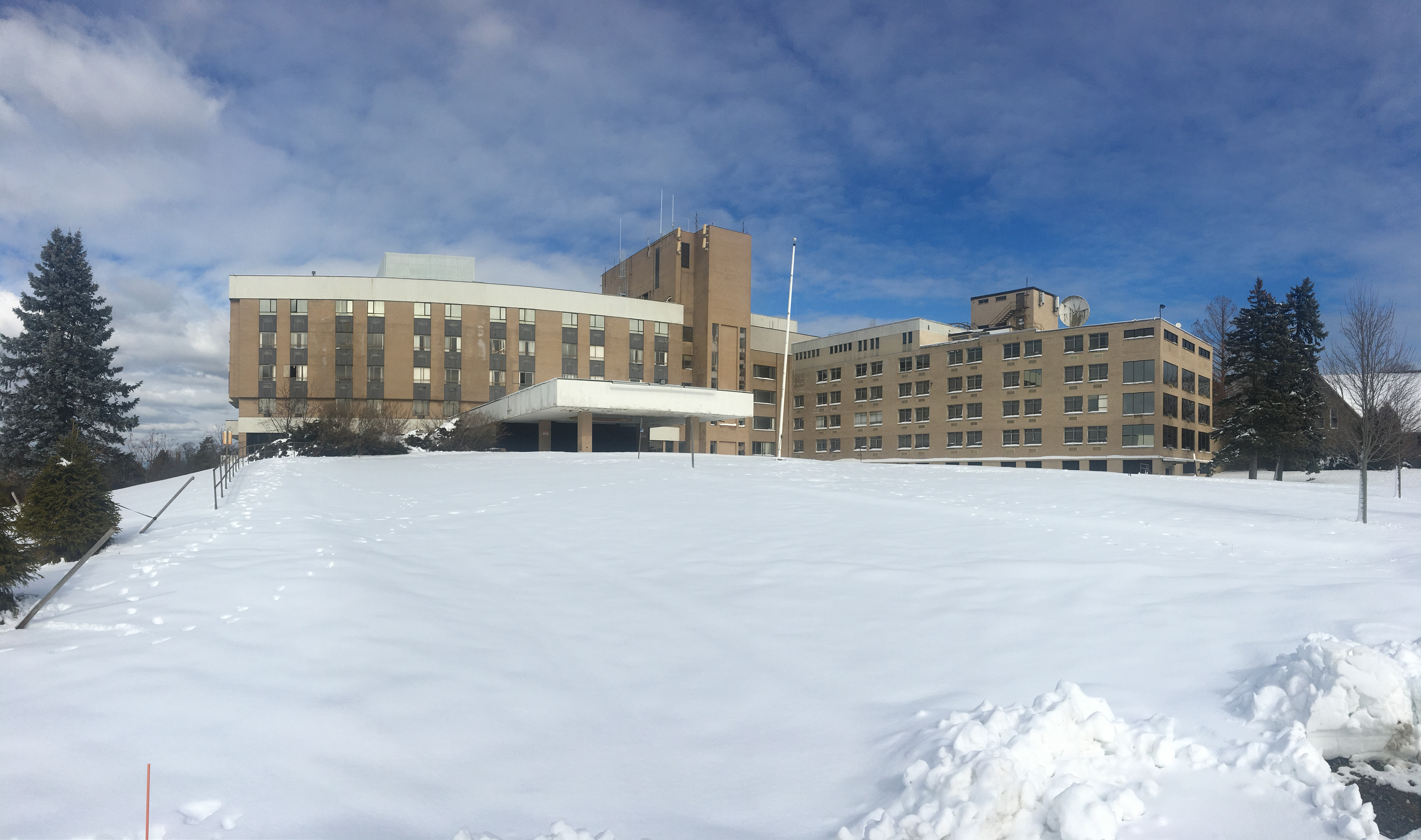
- The former Boston Regional Medical Center in February 2021

Geography
- Location: 5 Woodland Road, Stoneham, Massachusetts, United States

Services
- Beds: 187

History
- Founded: April 28, 1899
- Closed: February 1999

Links
- Lists: Hospitals in Massachusetts

Boston Regional Medical Center (often abbreviated to "Boston Regional" or "BRMC") was a 187-bed hospital located in Stoneham, Massachusetts. Previously known as New England Sanitarium and Hospital and later New England Memorial Hospital (in both instances a Seventh-day Adventist medical facility), it was located within the Middlesex Fells Reservation along Woodland Road in Stoneham, Massachusetts, until it closed in February 1999 for financial reasons.

Before its use as a hospital, the buildings formed the Langwood Hotel, operated during the 1880s by George F. Butterfield.

== Murder ==
Dr. Linda Goudey, an obstetrician who worked at New England Memorial Hospital, was strangled to death in her car in the hospital's parking lot.

== Births ==
- Buffy Sainte-Marie (Beverley Jean Santamaria)
