= The Playbook (2020 TV series) =

2020 documentary television series

- Genre: Documentary
- Country of origin: United States
- Original language: English
- No. of seasons: 1
- No. of episodes: 5

Production
- Running time: 31–35 minutes
- Production companies: Boardwalk Pictures; Delirio Films; SpringHill Entertainment

Original release
- Network: Netflix
- Release: September 22, 2020

The Playbook is a 2020 docuseries starring Patrick Mouratoglou, Glenn 'Doc' Rivers, Jill Ellis, José Mourinho, and Dawn Staley.

== Episodes ==
No.	Title	Original release date
1	"Doc Rivers"	September 22, 2020
2	"Jill Ellis"	September 22, 2020
3	"José Mourinho"	September 22, 2020
4	"Patrick Mouratoglou"	September 22, 2020
5	"Dawn Staley"	September 22, 2020

== Release ==
The Playbook was released on September 22, 2020, on Netflix.
