= Mallika Chopra =

American writer

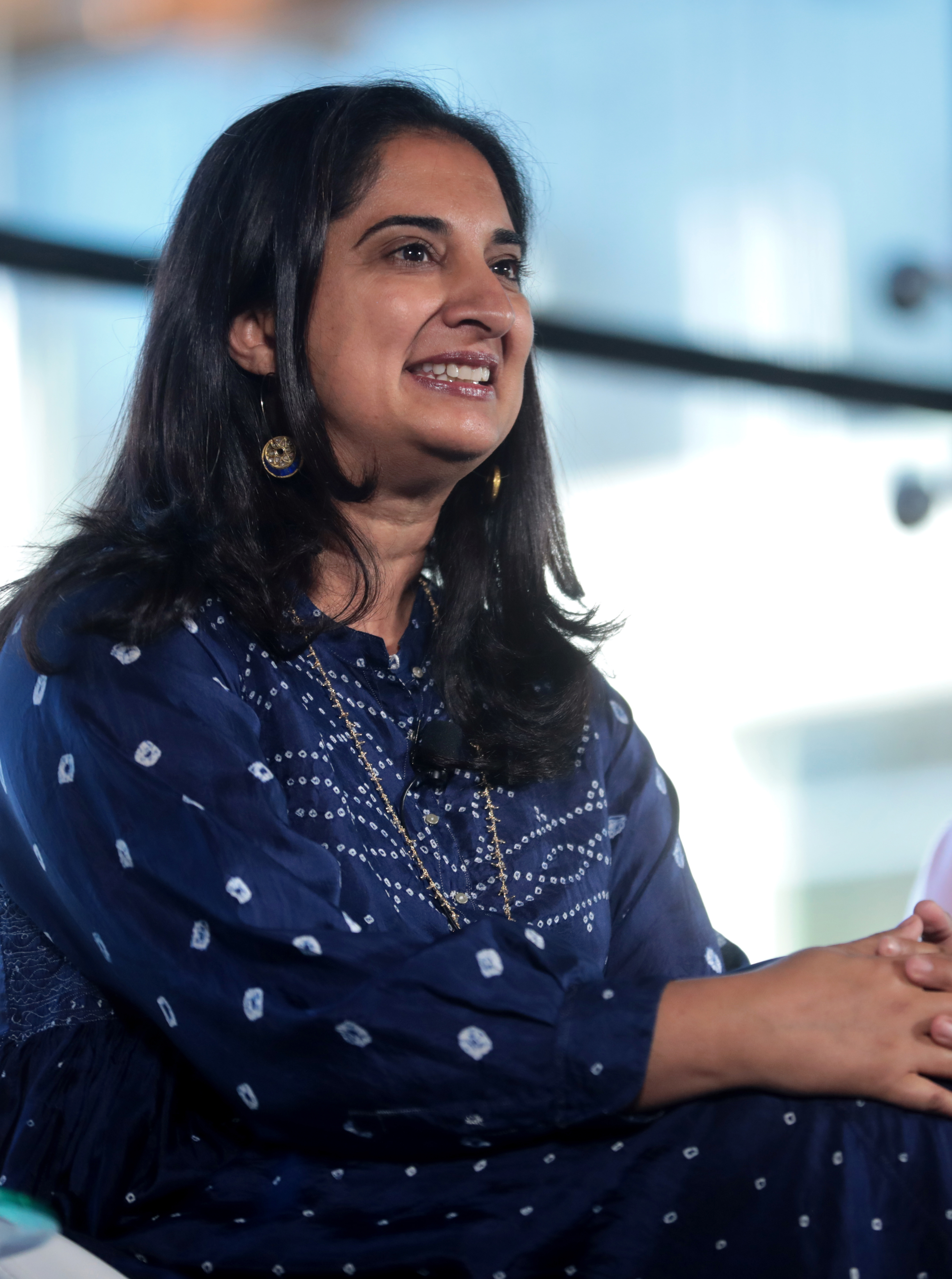
- Chopra in 2019
- Born: July 24, 1971 (age 55)
- Education: Columbia University, Kellogg School of Management, Concord Academy, Brown University
- Occupations: Author; motivational speaker
- Spouse: Sumant Mandal (m. 1996)
- Children: 2
- Father: Deepak Chopra
- Relatives: Gotham Chopra (brother); Sanjiv Chopra (uncle)

Mallika Chopra (born July 24, 1971) is an American author and businesswoman.

== Biography ==
Chopra's formative years were spent in Lincoln, Massachusetts. She pursued her secondary education at the nearby Concord Academy, in Concord, Massachusetts. She attained a Bachelor of Arts degree from Brown University, and an MBA from the Kellogg School of Management. She also holds a master's degree in Psychology and Education, from Columbia University.

In the early 2000s, Chopra co-established my potential.com website with her father, Deepak Chopra. She serves as the President of Chopra Media LLC, and is on the board of directors at Liquid Comics, previously known as Virgin Comics. Chopra also blogs on platforms such as Beliefnet and Huffington Post.

Chopra has written several self-help books aimed at adults, as well as a series of children's books (Just Be) centered on the theme of affirmations.

== Personal life ==
She is married to Sumant Mandal, who is currently a managing director of March Capital Partners. They have two daughters Tara and Leela.

== Bibliography ==
- 100 promises to my baby. Emmaus, Pennsylvania: Rodale, Inc. 2005. ISBN 978-1-59486-129-1. OCLC 57007749. "100 Promises to my baby."
- 100 questions from my child. New York, NY: Rodale, Inc. 2007. ISBN 978-1-59486-600-5. OCLC 80019848.
- Living With Intent: My Somewhat Messy Journey to Purpose, Peace and Joy. Harmony. 2015. ISBN 978-0804139878
- Just Breathe: Meditation, Mindfulness, Movement, and More. Running Press Kids. 2018. ISBN 978-0762491582
- Just Feel (2019) ISBN 978-0762494743
- Just Be You (2021) ISBN 978-0762471225
- My Body Is a Rainbow (2021) ISBN 978-0762499045
- Buddha and The Rose (2022) ISBN 978-0762478767
