= Greatness Code =

Documentary television series

- Promotional poster
- Genre: Sports documentary
- Directed by: Gotham Chopra
- Starring: LeBron James; Tom Brady; Alex Morgan; Shaun White; Usain Bolt; Katie Ledecky; Kelly Slater; Marcus Rashford; Russell Wilson; Letícia Bufoni; Scout Bassett; Bubba Wallace; Lindsey Vonn
- Country of origin: United States
- Original language: English
- No. of seasons: 2
- No. of episodes: 13

Production
- Executive producers: Gotham Chopra; Maverick Carter; Ameeth Sankaran; Devin Johnson
- Running time: 5-11 minutes
- Production companies: Religion of Sports; Uninterrupted

Original release
- Network: Apple TV+
- Release: July 10, 2020 – May 13, 2022

Greatness Code is short-form sports documentary television series directed by Gotham Chopra, highlighting untold stories about defining moments in professional athletes' careers. The series premiered on July 10, 2020 on Apple TV+, with season 2 premiered on May 13, 2022.

== Episodes ==
Dear... series overview
Season	Episodes	Originally released
1	7	July 10, 2020
2	6	May 13, 2022

=== Season 1 (2020) ===
No. overall	No. in season	Featuring	Original release date
1	1	LeBron James	July 10, 2020
2	2	Tom Brady	July 10, 2020
3	3	Alex Morgan	July 10, 2020
4	4	Shaun White	July 10, 2020
5	5	Usain Bolt	July 10, 2020
6	6	Katie Ledecky	July 10, 2020
7	7	Kelly Slater	July 10, 2020

=== Season 2 (2022) ===
No. overall	No. in season	Featuring	Original release date
8	1	Marcus Rashford	May 13, 2022
9	2	Russell Wilson	May 13, 2022
10	3	Letícia Bufoni	May 13, 2022
11	4	Scout Bassett	May 13, 2022
12	5	Bubba Wallace	May 13, 2022
13	6	Lindsey Vonn	May 13, 2022

== Release ==
On May 20, 2020, Apple announced Greatness Code, co-produced by Religion of Sports and Uninterrupted, with Gotham Chopra directing. The seven-episode series was released on July 10, 2020. Season 2 premiered on May 13, 2022.
