= List of Sindhi-language films =

This is a list of films produced by Sindhi cinema in Pakistan and India.

== A ==
- Abana (1958)
- Ach Ta Bhakar Payun (1976)
- Albeli (1973)
- Ali Gohar (1988)
- Allah Bachaeo (1992)
- Amar Uderolal (1988)
- Anya Ta Maan Nadhri Aahiyan
- Ammy Ain Mummy
- Aashiqi

== B ==
- Baadal (1972)
- Baadal Aain Barsat (1975)
- Barsat Ji Raat (1985)
- Bevis (1989)
- Bhagat Kanwar Ram (1951)

== C ==
- Chanduki (1969)
- Chanduki II: Deepak's revenge(1971)
- CHUD 2 (1988)

== D ==
- Darya Khan (1991)
- Dharti Aain Akash (1979)
- Dharti Dilanwarn Ji (1975)
- Dharti La Kanwar (1975)
- Dharti Manji Maa (1996)
- Dil Dije Dil Waran khe (2001)
- Ditho Waindo (1994)
- Dosten Jo Piar (1979)
- Dushman (1988)
- De Matha Par Khanje Hatha (2023)

== E ==
- Ekta (1942)

== F ==
- Faisala Zamir Jo (1989)
- Faatho Aah Bhagwaan (2013)

== G ==
- Ghairat Jo Sawal (1974)
- Ghato Ghar Na Aya (1981)
- Ghoonghat Lah Kunwar (1970)

== H ==
- Haidar Khan (1985)
- Hal ta Bhaji Haloon (1987)
- Halo Shaadiya Te (2004) - short film
- Hakim Khan (1986)
- Hazir Saeen (1979)
- Himmat (1997)
- Ho Jamalo (1986)
- Halyo Aa Putt Actor Thiyan (2012)
- Haseen Zindagi (2015)
- Hundraj Dukhayal: A True Sindhi Poet (2017)

== I ==
- Invisible Line (2017)
- Insaaf Kithe Ahe? (1959)
- Ishiqu Aazar? (2010)
- Indus Echoes (2023)

== J ==
- Jalal Chandio (1985)
- Jai Jhulelal (1989)
- Janu Dharial (1985)
- Jeejal Maa (1973)
- Jhoomar Ain Bandooq (1989)
- Jhulelal (1966)
- Jiye Lateef (1990)
- Jeevan Chakra (2010)
- Jeevan Saathi (2011)

== K ==
- Kalu Machhi (1990)
- Ker Kahinjo (1994)
- Karonjhar Te Kook (2014)
- Kayo Time Pass (2011)

== L ==
- Laila Majnu (1971)
- Ladli

== M ==
- Manju Pyar Pukare (1974)
- Meeran Jamali (1990)
- Mehboob Mitha (1971)
- Mehran Ja Moti (1988)
- Mithra Shal Millan (1972)
- Mofo Millions! (1998)
- Morak (1989)
- Mr. Shikarpuri (1993)
- Mr. Shakura (1991)
- Muhib Sheedi (1992)
- Mulakhro (1993)
- Mumta (1984)

== N ==
- Nadir Gohar (1988)
- Nakuli Shaan (1971)
- Nuri Jam Tamachi (1970)

== O ==
- Okha Pand Pyaar Ja

== P ==
- PKsindhi (2016)
- Paarewari (2002)
- Parai Zameen (1958)
- Phulji Station (2010)
- Perdesi (1960)
- Perdesi Aain Piar (1984)
- Phul Machhi (1984)
- Pland (1989)
- Poti Aeen Pag (1986)
- Pro (1987)
- Pukar (1989)
- Puke Party (1962)
- Punnu Aaqil (1970)
- Pyar Kare Dis (2007)
- Pyar Keyo Singhar (1974)
- Pyar Taan Sadqe (1974)
- Pahenjo Mikdo hi Yaar aa (2016)
- Pyar Jaa Rang (2013)

== Q ==
- Qurbani (1986)

== R ==
- Rang Mahal (1970)
- Rutt Ain Ajrak (1977)
- Rutt Ji Rand (1976)
- Rutt Ja Rishta (1975)
- Raat Hik Toofan Ji (1969)
- Riyasat (2007)

== S ==
- Son of Sindhi (2016)
- Shikarpur Ja Natak (2020) - Documentary Film
- Sajawal (1996)
- Sassi Punnu (1958)
- Sant Kanwarram (1990)
- Shaeed (1989)
- Shal Dheear Na Jaman (1970)
- Sherah Feroz (1968)
- Sindh Ja Sapot
- Sindhri Taa Sadqe (1975)
- Soda Putt Sindh Ja (1973)
- Sohna Saeen (1986)
- Soorath (1973)
- Shal Dhier Na Jaman
- Sant Kanwar Ram
- Sindhu Kinaray
- Sard Hawaoon (2014)
- Sindhyani (2017)
- Sasu Ser Nuhn Sawa Ser (2019)
- Shal Kainjhe Dea Na Bhaje (2023)

== T ==
- Tee Qaidi (1989)
- Tuhinje Pyaar Mein (2019)

== U ==
- Umeed (1983)
- Umar Marvi (1959)

== V ==
- Vardaan (2016)

== W ==
- Wadera Sain (1992)

== Z ==
- Zindagi Hik Natak (2009)

== See also ==
- Sindhi cinema
- List of Pakistani films
- List of Indian films
