= Ketan Anand =

Indian film director

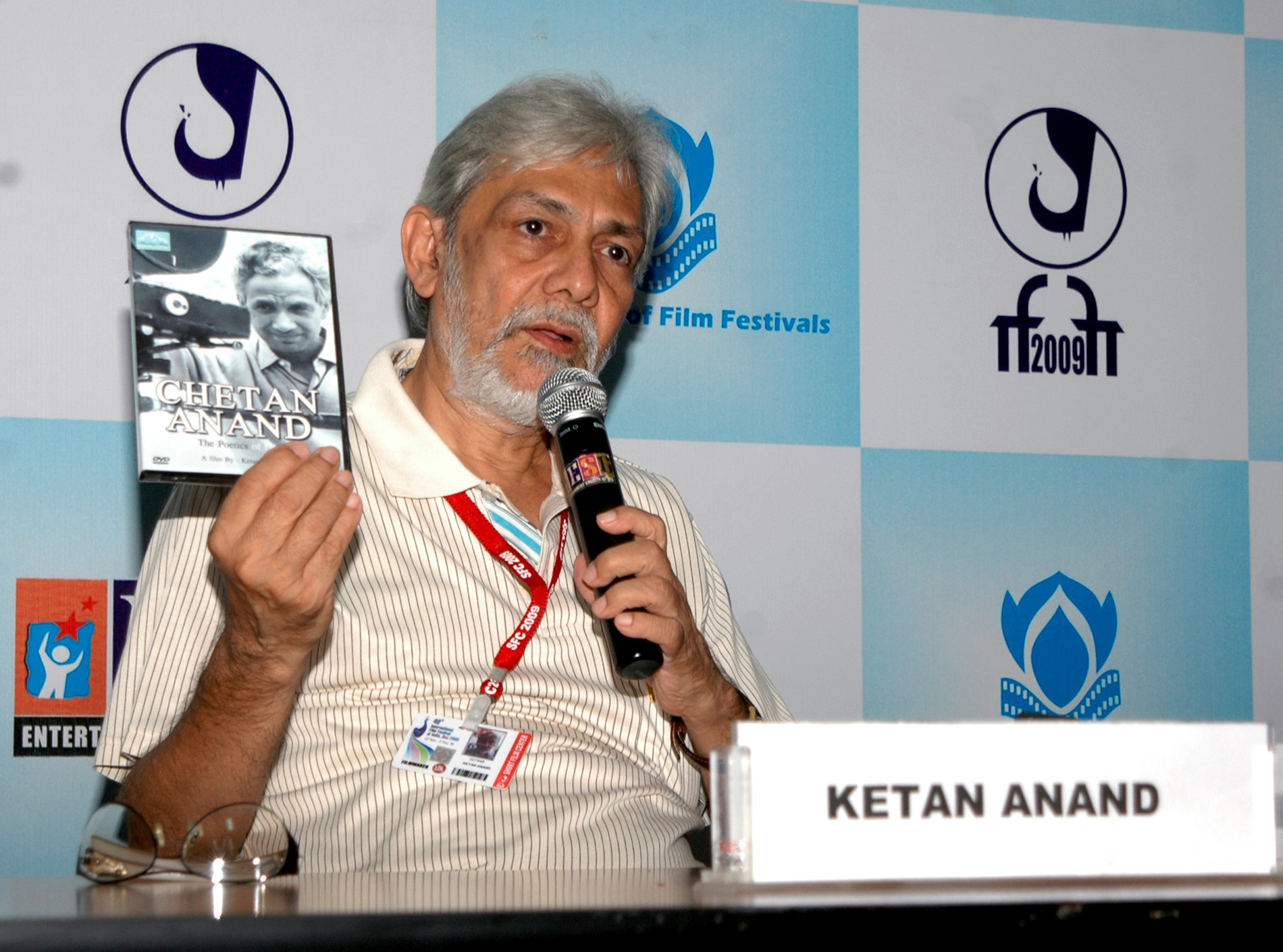
- Ketan Anand, IFFI (2009)
- Born: India
- Occupation: Film director
- Notable work: Heer Raanjha
- Parents: Chetan Anand (father); Uma Anand (mother)
- Relatives: Vivek Anand (brother)
- Family: Anand family

Ketan Anand is an Indian film director. He is son of filmmaker Chetan Anand and actress Uma Anand. He is the cousin of director Shekhar Kapur.

He has directed the movies Toote Khilone and Shart and was the associate producer of Heer Raanjha.

== Personal life ==
In early years of his life, Ketan and his brother Vivek Anand were featured in a song alongside Dev Anand and Sheila Ramani from the movie Funtoosh. Watching his father make films, Ketan decided to forgo Administration as his major and concentrated on theater. He graduated from St. Stephen's College, Delhi. In 2007, he co-authored the book Chetan Anand: The Poetics of Film with his mother.

In 2008, Ketan Anand was all set to revive his father, Chetan Anand's film banner Himalaya Films with a psychological love story titled Petrol Pump. This movie was written some 30–40 years ago by his father who had wanted to direct the film himself with Raaj Kumar and Rajesh Khanna in the lead. The script was his last gift to his son when he died.

He, along with his brother Vivek Anand and two employees, were convicted of murdering the actress Priya Rajvansh in 2000 and was sentenced to life imprisonment in July 2002. They were granted bail in November 2002 and got away with the murder.

== Filmography ==
- Aaja Meri Jaan (1993)
- Shart (1986)
- Hum Rahe Na Hum (1984)
- Toote Khilone (1978)
