= Shekhar Kapur's unrealized projects =

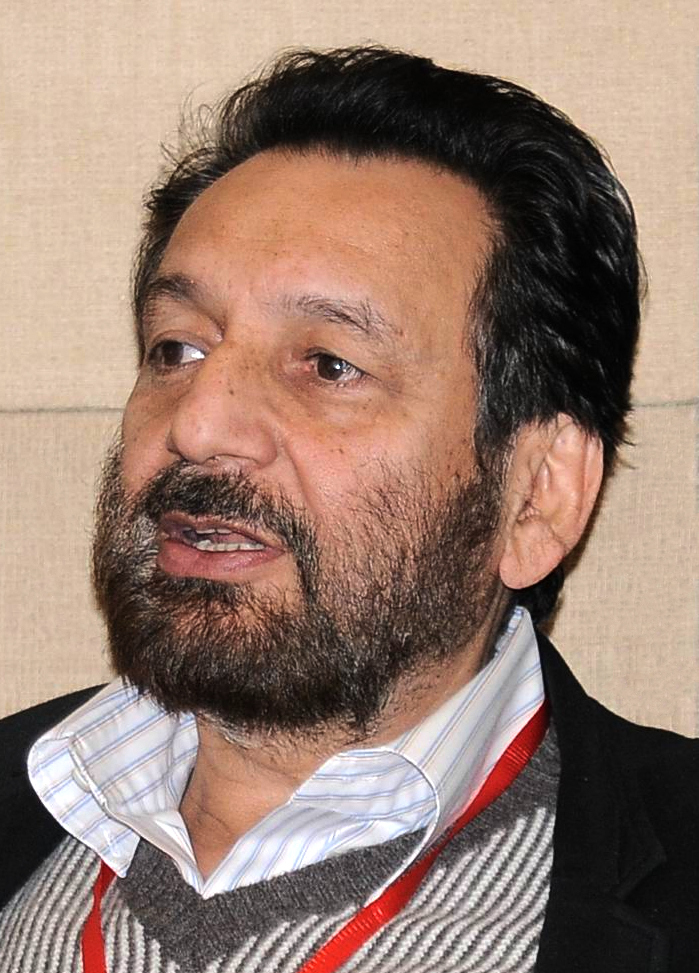
Shekhar in 2008

During his career, Indian director Shekhar Kapur has worked on a number of projects that never progressed beyond the pre-production stage under his direction. Some of these projects were canceled, some were turned over to other production teams, and others never made it past the speculative stage.

== Unrealized projects ==
=== Time Machine ===
In 1992, he was set to direct the sci-fi film titled Time Machine, which was to star Aamir Khan, Raveena Tandon, Naseeruddin Shah and Rekha, but he abandoned the project halfway through due to financial problems. The film was left incomplete, and there were talks many years later that Kapur would revive the project with a new cast, which never happened.

=== Elizabeth: The Dark Age ===
Elizabeth: The Dark Age, a third episode in the Queen Elizabeth series, was planned.

=== Foundation series ===
According to screenwriter John Rogers, the success of Elizabeth led to Kapur being tapped to work on an adaptation of Isaac Asimov's Foundation Trilogy for 20th Century Fox, but later the project got shelved.

=== Buddha ===
Kapur tentatively planned to direct a movie of the life of the Buddha, titled Buddha, but the plans were dropped for unstated reasons.

=== Larklight film adaptation ===
He planned to adapt Larklight, a book by Philip Reeve. Kapur traveled to Armenia to explore the possibility of making a film about the Armenian genocide. In an interview with Associated Content, Kapur announced he is no longer attached to Larklight.

=== Hippie Hippie Shake ===
In February 2002, it was reported that Kapur was attached to direct Hippie Hippie Shake, a script by Tom Butterworth based on Richard Neville's autobiographical account of his misadventures in London at the end of the swinging '60s.

=== Paani ===
In December 2002, Shekhar Kapur announced that his next project would be titled Paani, describing it as a "futuristic Blade Runner-type script based on India's haves and have nots". He revealed that the story would be based 60 years from the present in a hypothetical time when water has run out, and he noted that he thought of the theme when he was making Bandit Queen (1994). A team including scriptwriter Andrew Niccol, music composer A. R. Rahman, editor Jill Bilcock and production designer John Myhre was announced for the project. In 2003, Vivek Oberoi was approached to play the lead role in the film, but the project did not materialise.

In November 2007, Kapur announced his disappointment that the film had failed to find producers and revealed that he was keen to produce it. Reports throughout the late 2000s suggested that producers including Barrie Osborne and Danny Boyle were interested in the project but no official announcement from a studio was made. Kapur later revealed concept posters of the film and held a press conference at the Marche du Film of the Cannes Film Festival in 2010 in attempt to find financiers. Later in the year, Kapur began negotiations with Yash Raj Films to be the producers and for Hrithik Roshan to be the lead actor of the film.

In November 2012, Kapur's collaboration with Yash Raj Films and producer Aditya Chopra was confirmed. Discussions with Roshan continued in late 2012 but Kapur later revealed that the script and the actor had evolved with time, and there was no longer a match between the actor and the script. Ranbir Kapoor was considered for the film, then Sushant Singh Rajput was signed in September 2013. Kapur denied media reports that actresses Monica Bellucci and Anushka Sharma were approached to play the leading female role. Reports regarding the film's casting continued throughout 2014 and 2015 with actresses Kristen Stewart, Emma Watson, Jennifer Lawrence, Kangana Ranaut, Ayesha Kapur and Rekha speculated as being a part of the cast. John Travolta also revealed that Kapur had approached him for a role in the film. The delay in the film's production had led to Rajput opting out of twelve other projects. The actor had become involved in the making of the film, with Kapur noting that Rajput was "fully immersed in the character" and that the project had become an "addiction" for him.

By June 2015, Kapur and producer Chopra decided not to collaborate on the film owing to creative disagreements, especially on the casting of Rajput in the lead role. Rajput had been sidelined by Chopra on other films by Yash Raj Films, including Befikre (2016). Kapur suggested that he would seek international financiers because he felt producers in the Indian film industry were failing to relate to the film's core theme. The project was shelved by April 2017, but the success of Baahubali: The Beginning (2017) prompted Kapur to resume his plans of making the film in late 2017, potentially with Ranveer Singh in the lead role. As of 2025, the film remains unmade, with Kapur's noting that he would dedicate the film to Rajput, who died in 2020, if it is made.

=== Solace ===
In 2005, Kapur signed to direct the mystery thriller Solace, with Bruce Willis attached to star.

=== The Nine o'Clock War ===
One of his projects was a film tentatively titled The Nine o'Clock War. He had planned this project with his longtime friend and previous collaborator Heath Ledger in the role of a popular television news anchor. It never happened as a result of the actor's unexpected death in 2008.

=== TV series about Cleopatra ===
In 2015, He was set to direct a series titled Cleopatra about Cleopatra of ancient Egypt, developed by David Ellender's Slingshot Global Media. It was reported that Jennifer Lawrence would star as Cleopatra. The project later got shelved.

=== Bruce Lee biopic ===
It was announced that he will direct Little Dragon, an authorized biopic of martial arts legend Bruce Lee. As of 2025, there is no information regarding the project.

=== Sheikh Zayed biopic ===
It was announced in 2018 that Kapur was developing a biopic of Muslim leader and former President of United Arab Emirates, Sheikh Zayed, and would direct from a screenplay written by Cliff Dorfman.

=== Ibis Trilogy TV series ===
It was announced in March 2019 that Kapur will be directing a TV series for Endemol Shine based on historical novels by Amitav Ghosh, known as the "Ibis Trilogy", which details the opium wars among Britain, India and China in the mid-19th century.

=== Shiva Trilogy TV series ===
Kapur is all set to adapt Amish Tripathi's critically acclaimed book series Shiva Trilogy into a television web show. He will be co-directing the show with Suparn Verma.

=== Masoom... The New Generation ===
As of 2023, a sequel to Kapur's first film Masoom was being planned, under the title Masoom... The New Generation, with him returning to direct.

=== Ebony McQueen ===
In 2024, it was reported that Kapur was hired by Dave Stewart to direct the 1960s/70s coming-of-age story Ebony McQueen, inspired by Stewart's teen years in the North East of England.

== Abandoned projects ==
=== Joshilaay ===
He was originally the director of the 1989 film Joshilaay, which starred Sunny Deol, Anil Kapoor, Sridevi and Meenakshi Sheshadri, then he left the production halfway, and its producer Sibti Hassan Rizvi completed the film.

=== Barsaat ===
In 1992, he had shot some scenes for Barsaat, which originally was titled Champion, and it was going to be the debut film of Bobby Deol, but he left the production and was replaced by Rajkumar Santoshi.

=== Dushmani ===
In 1995, he partly directed Dushmani, starring Sunny Deol, Jackie Shroff and Manisha Koirala, then its producer Bunty Soorma completed the film.

=== Roop Ki Rani Choron Ka Raja ===
Roop Ki Rani Choron Ka Raja was announced in 1987 with Shekhar as the director, but he left the film stating "it (film) lacked soul." He was replaced by Satish Kaushik.

=== Prem ===
Shekhar was attached as a director. He convinced Tabu to stay in India and abandon her plans for her higher studies for this film but he never got on board with the project as a director. Later, Satish Kaushik directed the film.

=== Raja ===
This movie was supposed to be Shekhar's debut directorial, but he did not direct this movie for unknown reasons and it was directed by Indra Kumar. Sanjay Kapoor shared in an interview "Shekhar Kapur was initially supposed to direct Prem...the problem with Shekhar is that he is a very lazy guy, which is why he has made such few films over 30 years. He never wanted to start it, and that led to my frustration."

=== Steinbeck's Point of View ===
In 1999, Kapur struck a deal with Warner Bros. and Bel Air Entertainment to make Steinbeck's Point of View his next directorial assignment, but he left the project in favour of making The Four Feathers instead.

=== The Phantom of the Opera ===
In 1999, Kapur was developing to direct the long-awaited screen adaptation of Andrew Lloyd Webber's hit musical The Phantom of the Opera, planning to cast Antonio Banderas and Catherine Zeta-Jones in the main roles. However he left the project.

=== Superman Lives ===
Kapur was offered to direct Superman Lives after Tim Burton had dropped out, but he turned it down.

== See also ==
- Works of Shekhar Kapur
