= Samina Peerzada =

Pakistani actress and film director

- ثمینہ پیرزادہ
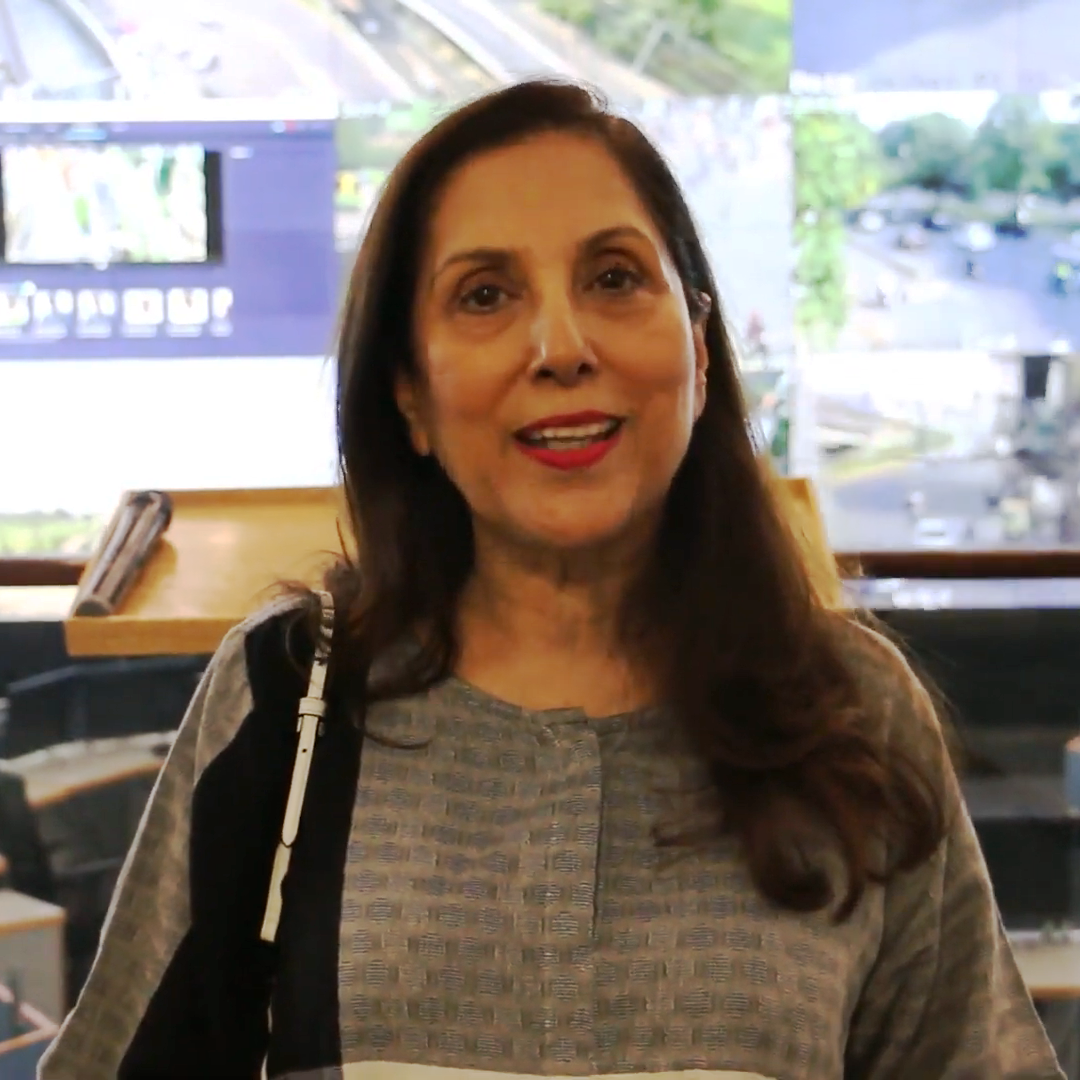
- Peerzada in 2019
- Born: Samina Butt; 9 August 1955 (age 71); Lahore, Punjab, Pakistan
- Education: Government College of Commerce & Economics
- Alma mater: PECHS, Karachi
- Occupations: Actress; Producer; Host; Model; Director; Activist
- Years active: 1974 – Present
- Known for: Performance, Progress, Peace
- Notable work: Zindagi Gulzar Hai; Meri Zaat Zarra-e-Benishan; Durr-e-Shehwar Ptv Drama Rangeel Pur
- Style: Versatile
- Spouse: Usman Peerzada (m. 1975)
- Children: 2
- Relatives: Faizan Peerzada (brother-in-law); Zara Peerzada (niece); Rafi Peer (father-in-law); Anwar Ul Haq Ansari (father); MBuggi Ansari (brother); Samina Zaman (cousin)
- Awards: Pakistan Television (PTV) Award (2011); Nigar Awards in 1988 and 1990; Lux Style Awards in 2007; Lifetime Achievement Award at Beyond the Mango Film Festival in 2013; HUM Awards in 2013, 2014 and 2015

Samina Peerzada (née Butt, Punjabi, Urdu: ثمینہ پیرزادہ) is a Pakistani film and television actress, producer and director. She was a popular model in the 1970s, and among the most successful Pakistani actresses of the 1980s and 1990s.

== Early life ==
Samina was born into an educated Kashmiri family in Lahore, but after separation of her parents she was raised in Karachi, Sindh, Pakistan. After graduating in commerce, she chose to pursue a career in acting. After many successful years of acting in television dramas and minor roles in television advertisements, Samina was cast in starring roles in several films.

== Career ==
Samina started her career as a model in 1974 and then she acted in several films including Nazdikiyan, Mukhra, Bazar-e-Husn, Shaadi Mere Shohar Ki and Bulandi.

She has traveled widely and has also performed in Oslo at The International Ibsen Festival. Her notable stage performances include productions such as Raaz-o-Niaz and Ibsen's A Doll's House.

Television plays to her credit include Zindagi Gulzar Hai, Meri Zaat Zarra-e-Benishan, Rehaai, Durr-e-Shahwar, Dastaan and Karobi.

Her first Hollywood film, The Valley, released on 2 March 2018. Alyy Khan, another actor from Pakistan is also starring in this film.

Peerzada made her directorial debut through Inteha, a critically acclaimed film addressing the social issue of marital rape. Subsequently, she directed the less well-received commercial film Shararat.

She is also the host of Rewind with Samina Peerzada on YouTube.

== Personal life ==
She married Usman Peerzada, a fellow media personality, in 1975. The couple have two daughters, Anum and Amal. Their younger daughter Amal is a miniature artist.

== Filmography ==
Actress

PTV drama series 'Jaane Do' in 1980s opposite Behrouz Sabzwari

=== Television series ===
Drama	Role	Year	Broadcasting Network	Additional Notes
Darya	Wife	1983	PTV	Plays the role of a runaway (city) wife who finds protection, acceptance, respect, love and boundless affection from simple village folks making a lifelong bond by marrying into the tribe.
Zard Dopehar	Zaitoon	1995	PTV	Zaytoon
Wafa Kay Mausam	Mother	2001	PTV	
Sheeshay Ka Mahal		2002	PTV	
Thori Si Mohabbat	Leading Lady	2004	Geo TV	
Ana	Sadiqa	2004	PTV	
Dil, Diya, Dehleez	Sheher Bano	2006	Hum TV	Dil, Diya, Dehleez is a drama which is based on the novel of same name by Riffat Siraj
Tere Aajaney Se		2006	TV ONE	
Ishq Ki Inteha		2009	Geo TV	Nominated for Best TV Serial
Thori Door Sath Chalo		2009	Hum TV	
Meri Zaat Zarra-e-Benishan	Tai Amma	2009	Geo TV	Meri Zaat is the most-viewed serial on Geo TV to date.
Noorpur Ki Rani	Anna	2009	Hum TV	
Tair-e-Lahooti		2009	Hum TV	
Mohabbat Kaun Rokay		2009	ARY Digital	
Dil Ki Dehleez Par		2009	PTV	
The Ghost		2009	Hum TV	
Dil-e-Nadan		2009	Geo TV	
Kalmoohi	Aasiya	2010	PTV	
Natak Mandi		2010	PTV	
Bebak		2010	Hum TV	
Dastaan	Bibi/Saleha	2010	Hum TV	Dastaan is based on a novel on the independence of Pakistan written by Razia Butt
Kafir	Mehwish	2011	ARY Digital	
Pani Jaisa Piyar	Arfa	2011	Hum TV	
Koi Lamha Gulab Ho		2011	Hum TV	
Rangeelpur	Mother	2011	PTV	
Mera Naseeb	Salima	2011	Hum TV	
Kuch Khwab Thay Meray	Annie	2011	ARY Digital	
Durr-e-Shahwar	Durr-e-Shahwar	2012	Hum TV	A phenomenal show that explores the difficulties faced by women after marriage
Shehr-e-Zaat	Naani/Amma	2012	Hum TV	
Roshan Sitara	Roshan Ara's mother	2012	Hum TV	
Zindagi Gulzar Hai	Rafia (Kashaf's Mother)	2012	Hum TV	Hum Award for Best Supporting Actress. Plays the role of a mother every one of us would want to have.
Ghaao	Mahjabeen	2012	Geo TV	
Rehaai	Sumaira	2013	Hum TV	Plays the role of a mother(in-law) every married lady would want to have, supportive, sensitive and always defending the rights and aspirations of daughter-in-law(s).
Kuch Is Tarah		2013	PTV	
Chaar Chaand	Mother	2013	Geo TV	
Meri Beti	Airaj's Grandmother	2013	ARY Digital	
Kitni Girhain Baaki Hain	Mother	2014	Hum TV	Episode: Wida Na Karna Maa
Kaanch		2014	ARY Digital	
Adhura Milan	Noor-ul-Ain	2014	A-Plus Entertainment	
Neelum Kinaray		2015	Hum TV	
Judai		2016	ARY Digital	
Beqasoor		2016	ARY Digital	
Aap Ke Liye	Nishat Malik	2016	ARY Digital	Plays the role of a crafty elder sister.
Bay Aib	Sadaf	2016	Urdu1	Plays the role of a high headed and very haughty lady.
Rasm E Duniya	Elder Sister-in-Law	2017	ARY Digital	Plays the role of a family matriarch.
Karb	wife		PTV	

=== Film ===
Film	Role	Year	Additional Notes
Ranga Daku		1978	
The Blood of Hussain	Lisa (General's daughter)	1980	Released in February 1981 in the UK. Banned in Pakistan.
Kala Dhanda Goray Log		1981	
Shaadi Mere Shohar Ki	Leading Lady	1986	
Mukhra	Nadeem's sister	1988	Punjabi film
Bazar-e-Husn		1988	
Jangju Goreelay		1990	
Bulandi	Mother	1990	
Nazdeekiyan	Samina Pirzada	1991	
Pabandi		1992	
Khwahish		1993	aka The Wish (International: English title)
Zar Gul	Nawab's Wife	1997	
The Valley	Didi	2017	Hollywood film
Motorcycle Girl	Zeinth's Mother	2018	Pakistani film
Huey Tum Ajnabi	Indira Gandhi	2023	
Deemak	Kulsoom Begum	2025	

=== Direction ===
Films
Film	Role	Year	Additional Notes
Zar Gul	Director, writer, Nawab's Wife	1997	
Inteha	Director, Producer	1999	The movie was Samina Peerzada's debut directorial attempt
Shararat	Director	2003	

== Awards and recognition ==
Samina Peerzada's directorial debut Inteha received nine national awards. She was also conferred with a Lifetime Achievement Award at the Beyond the Mango Film Festival held in Bradford, UK, in November 2013. She consecutively won the Hum Award for Best Supporting Actress in 2013 and 2014 for Roshan Sitara and Zindagi Gulzar Hai. She was decorated with the Lifetime Achievement Award for Excellence in Television by Hum TV at the 3rd Hum Awards held in Dubai in April 2015.

=== Nigar Awards ===
Year	Award	Category	Result	Title	Ref.
1988	Nigar Award	Best Supporting Actress	Won	Mukhra	
1990	Nigar Award	Best Supporting Actress	Won	Bulandi	

=== PTV Awards ===
Year	Award	Category	Result	Title	Ref.
2011	16th PTV Awards	Best Compere	Won	Sunday Lounge	

=== Lux Style Awards ===
Year	Award	Category	Title	Result	Ref.
2005	4th Lux Style Awards	Best Television Actress (Satellite)	Ana	Nominated	
2007	6th Lux Style Awards	Best Television Actress (Terrestrial)	Kath Putli	Won	
2014	13th Lux Style Awards	Best Television Actress (Satellite)	Rehaai	Nominated	

=== Mango Film Festival ===
Year	Award	Category	Result	Title	Ref.
2013	Beyond the Mango Film Festival	Lifetime Achievement Award	Won	—N/a	

=== Hum Awards ===
Year	Award	Category	Result	Title	Ref.
2013	1st Hum Awards	Best Supporting Actress	Won	Roshan Sitara	
2014	2nd Hum Awards	Best Supporting Actress	Won	Zindagi Gulzar Hai	
2015	3rd Hum Awards	Hum Honorary Television Award	Won	—N/a	

=== Pakistan Media Awards ===
Year	Award	Category	Result	Title	Ref.
2013	4th Pakistan Media Awards	Best Supporting Actress	Nominated	Zindagi Gulzar Hai	

=== CPACT Canada Awards ===
Year	Award	Category	Result	Title	Ref.
2018	CPACT Awards	Best Iconic Couple Award	Won	—N/a	

== See also ==
- List of Pakistani actresses
