= Parai Zameen =

Parai Zameen پَرائي زمين
- Directed by: Shaikh Hassan
- Written by: Dukhi Prem Nagri
- Produced by: A. G. Mirza
- Starring: Talib Ali
- Cinematography: Mehboob
- Music by: Ghulam Nabi Abdul Lateef
- Release date: 14 August 1958
- Country: Pakistan
- Language: Sindhi
- Box office: Rs. 0.001 crore (US$36)

Parai Zameen (Sindhi: پَرائي زمين) is a Sindhi film released on 14 August 1958. It was directed by Shaikh Hassan, produced by A. G. Mirza and starred Talib Ali.

== See also ==
- Sindhi cinema
- List of Sindhi-language films
