= Ratan Rangwani =

Indian actor and writer

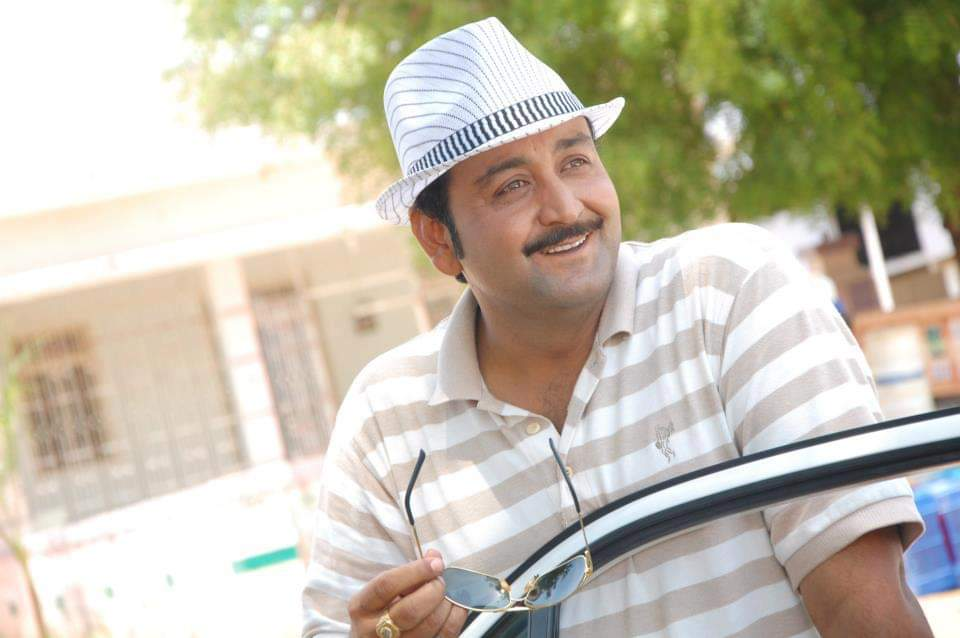
- Born: August 19, 1972 (age 53)
- Occupation: Actor
- Years active: 2008 - present

Ratan Rangwani (born August 19, 1972) is an actor, and writer associated with Gujarati cinema. He also performed in Hindi, Marathi, and Sindhi films. In 2014, Rangwani completed fifty films.

== Films ==
=== Gujarati-language films ===
- Harpalde Shakti Na Amar Anjvana
- City Girl 009
- Harpale Shakti Na Amar Anjwada
- Lekh Suhagan Na
- Mangu Sayba Janmon Janam No Saath
- Don Lewa Gayo Loan
- Rajput Nu DiL Ne Rajput Ni Dosti
- Annadata Shri Kuber Bhandari (Telefilm)
- Preet Karnar Kadi Duniya Thi Darta Nathi
- Ekaj Target
- Bajrang Leela
- Maadi Laaj Rakhje Mari Pratigya Ni
- Desh Ni Koi Sarhad Prem Ne Roki Shakti Nathi
- Haseen Zindagi (also writer)
- Radha Rahishu Saday Sathe
- Madi Laaj Rakhje Mari Pratigya Ni

=== Hindi-language films ===
- Deadly Encounter

== Television ==
=== Gujrati serial ===
- Bhagwan Shri Swaminarayan

=== Hindi serial ===
- Sankalp
