= Time Machine (unfinished film) =

- Directed by: Shekhar Kapur
- Starring: Aamir Khan; Rekha; Naseeruddin Shah; Raveena Tandon
- Music by: A R Rahman
- Country: India
- Language: Hindi

Time Machine is an unfinished Bollywood science-fiction film which was in production in 1992 and was directed by Shekhar Kapur. The film's cast included Aamir Khan, Rekha, Naseeruddin Shah, Raveena Tandon, Gulshan Grover and Vijay Anand. After three-fourths of the film's shooting was completed, it was shelved due to financial constraints and Kapur's departure to the U.S. In 2008, Shekhar Kapur announced he would attempt to revive the film with a new cast but this never materialised.

== Plot ==
The film was said to be based on the Hollywood hit time-travel film Back to the Future and H. G. Wells's The Time Machine. Aamir Khan was to play the leading character who goes back in time from the 1990s to the 1960s and meets his would be parents (played by Naseeruddin Shah & Rekha). Vijay Anand was cast as the scientist who invents the time machine. Raveena Tandon was cast as the love interest. Gulshan Grover and Amrish Puri were cast in other roles.

== See also ==
- Shekhar Kapur's unrealized projects
- Action Replayy (2010), another Indian film based on Back to the Future
