= Indus Echoes =

Sindhi language film

- Directed by: Rahul Aijaz
- Written by: Rahul Aijaz
- Produced by: Rahul Aijaz
- Starring: Vajdaan Shah; Ansaar Mahar; Samina Seher
- Production companies: Film N' Chips Media Productions; Big Meta Films; Shaam Films Entertainment
- Release date: 2025
- Country: Pakistan
- Language: Sindhi

Indus Echoes (Sindhi: سنڌوءَ جو پڙاڏو) is a 2025 Pakistani Sindhi-language. It is the first Sindhi language feature film in the last 26 years in Pakistan. The film is written, directed, and produced by entertainment journalist and filmmaker Rahul Aijaz and executive produced by Shamoon Abbasi, Akhtiar Ali Kalwar and Vajdaan Shah. It is a collaboration between Pakistani, South Korean and Bangladeshi production companies and talents. The film is currently in post-production.

== Cast ==
- Anika Kulsoom
- Ansaar Mahar
- Samina Seher

== Plot ==
Indus Echoes explore the relationship between humans and the great Indus River through five stories.

== See also ==
- Sindhi cinema
- List of Sindhi-language films
