= Zara Peerzada =

Pakistani model

Zara Peerzada (23 March 1992) is a model hailing from Lahore, Pakistan. She is famous for shoots and magazine covers. She belongs to a well-known family of artists.

== Background ==
As the daughter of Salmaan Peerzada, an actor and director, she is a member of the Peerzada Family based in Lahore. Her paternal uncles include the actor Usman Peerzada and puppeteer, Faiza Peerzada. Through Usman's marriage she is also the niece of Samina Peerzada. She was a Journalism student in her academic life. Peerzada is single and openly expresses her annoyance over pressure on young women for marriage. She is reported to have been asked 17 times in 5 days about her future marital plans. Apart from modelling, Peerzada likes travelling and charity work.

== Career ==
Peerzada became the face of Luscious in 2011.

She made her acting debut through 2025 Ramadan special television series My Dear Cinderella, along with Khaqan Shahnawaz.

=== Harassment incident ===
She was once approached by an agent for 'sex work'. When she refused, she was abused by the sender. She took to social media, expressing her annoyance. She also shared the pictures of the chat. On this incident, she is reported to have said on her Instagram profile, "Soliciting every woman in entertainment is a major problem in this country's narrative of the female entertainment. All of you shocked by the content of these messages must understand that this is only a fraction of what women in entertainment suffer on a daily basis, whether we are Meesha Shafi or Mahira Khan or just a small time model. There are daily threats and abuse because of the cultural and national perspective of women in entertainment. Friends the answer to this is not 'just ignore it'. Telling women to ignore their reality is never the answer. That is an opinion that comes from an incredibly privileged place of power. It is not the job of women to ignore and remedy the evil in the world. It is not the job of women to turn a blind eye to cultural and global offensives to us. It is our job to collectively call them out and rectify them. I will reiterate that I have nothing against sex workers. As a good friend Eman Suleman once said 'don't insult them, it takes courage to be one. Courage I have not.' My anger is the perspective and assumption of women in entertainment as a whole. No matter what we do, what accolades we earn this is all we will be reduced to by a community, by a country".

== Filmography ==
- My Dear Cinderella as Sana (2025) – Hum TV
