= Works of Shekhar Kapur =

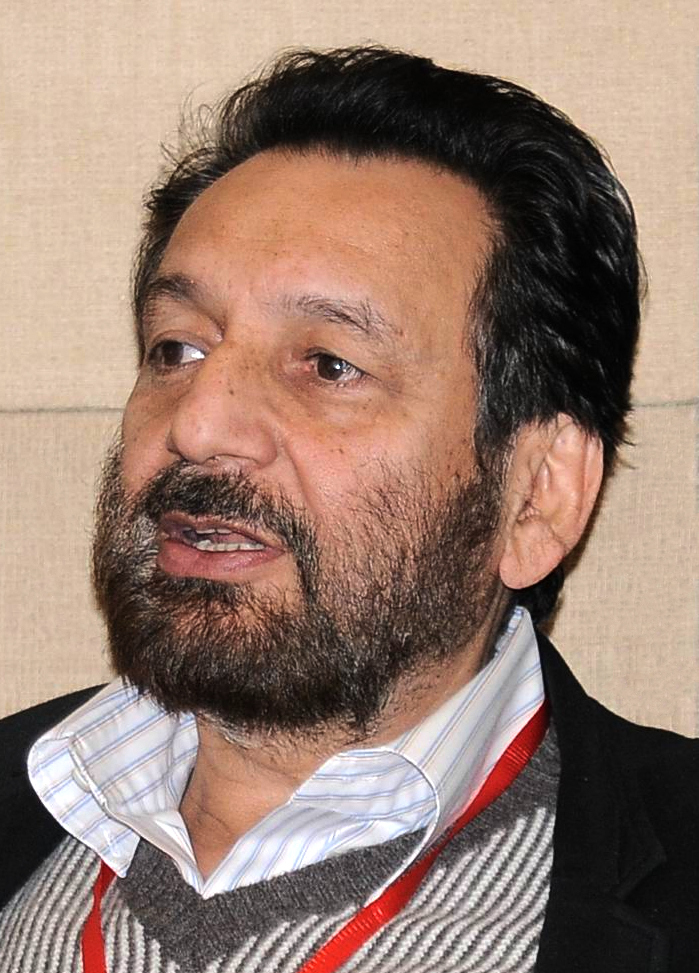
Shekhar in 2008

This is the complete list, in chronological order, for works of Shekhar Kapur, a film-maker, thought leader and a chartered accountant by training. This list includes his acting and directing credits in films, stage, television shows.

== Films ==
Year	Title	Director	Producer
1983	Masoom	Yes	No
1987	Mr. India	Yes	No
1989	Joshilaay	Uncredited	No
1994	Bandit Queen	Yes	No
1998	Dil Se..	No	Yes
1998	Elizabeth	Yes	No
2002	The Guru	No	Executive
2002	The Four Feathers	Yes	No
2007	Elizabeth: The Golden Age	Yes	No
2022	What's Love Got to Do with It?	Yes	No

=== Acting credits ===
Year	Title	Role	Notes
1974	Ishq Ishq Ishq		
1975	Jaan Hazir Hai		
1978	Toote Khilone		
1978	Pal Do Pal Ka Saath		
1979	Jeena Yahan		
1980	Khanjar	Ramesh	
1981	Agni Pareeksha		
1981	Bhula Na Dena		Uncredited
1984	Bindiya Chamkegi	Raj A. Kumar	
1988	Falak- The Sky	Inspector Jimmy	
1988	Akarshan	Himself	Cameo appearance
1989	Gawaahi	Ranjeet Chaudhary	
1990	Drishti	Nikhil	
1991	Nazar	Antique Dealer	
1992	Saatwan Aasman	Dev	
2013	Vishwaroopam	R.A.W Agent Colonel Jagannathan	Tamil-Hindi film
2013	Ishkq in Paris	Ranveer	
2015	Iftaar	Ghalib	Voice, short
2016	Teraa Surroor	Rajeev Kaul	
2016	Science of Compassion	Himself	Documentary
2018	Vishwaroopam II	R.A.W Agent Colonel Jagannathan	Tamil-Hindi film
2024	Schirkoa: In Lies We Trust	Council Member	Voice

=== Short films ===
Year	Title	Director	Producer	Notes
2008	New York, I Love You	Yes	No	Anthology
2009	Passage	Yes	No	
2013	Venice 70: Future Reloaded	Yes	Yes	Anthology
2015	Iftaar	No	Executive	
2019	Tipu	No	Yes	

=== Documentary films ===
Year	Title	Director	Producer	Notes
2011	Bollywood: The Greatest Love Story Ever Told	No	Yes	
2016	Science of Compassion	Yes	No	
2016	India in a Day	No	No	Creative consultant

== Television ==
Year	Title	Director	Executive producer	Notes
1994	Tehkikaat	Yes	No	
2016	Damien	Yes	Yes	Directed episode: "The Beast Rises"
2017	Will	Yes	Yes	Directed 4 episodes

=== Acting roles ===
Year	Title	Role	Notes
1985	Khandaan		
1988	Mahanagar		
1988	Uppanyas		
1989–1991	Udaan	Harish Menon	
2013–2014, 2020	Pradhanmantri	Himself	34 episodes
2021	OK Computer	Cyrus Noor Xerxes	Episode: "Hello World"

== Stage ==
Year	Title	Director	Producer	Creator	Notes
2002	Bombay Dreams	No	Yes	Yes	
2018	Matterhorn	Yes	No	No	
2022	Why? - The Musical	Yes	Yes	Yes	Co-produced with A.R. Rahman

== Comic books ==
Year	Title	Creator	Publisher	Notes
2006	Snake Woman	Yes	Yes	
2006–2008	Devi	Yes	Yes	
2006–2008	Ramayan 3392 A.D.	Yes	Yes	Co-created with Deepak Chopra
2007	Guy Ritchie's Gamekeeper	No	Yes	
2008	Project Kalki	No	Yes	
2008	Jimmy Zhingchak - Agent of D.I.S.C.O.	No	Yes	
