= Neecha Nagar =

1946 film by Chetan Anand

- Poster
- Directed by: Chetan Anand
- Written by: Khwaja Ahmad Abbas
- Story by: Hayatullah Ansari
- Based on: The Lower Depths by Maxim Gorky
- Produced by: Rashid Anwar; A. Halim
- Starring: Rafiq Anwar; Uma Anand; Kamini Kaushal; Rafi Peer; Hamid Butt; Zohra Sehgal
- Cinematography: Bidyapati Ghosh
- Music by: Ravi Shankar
- Production company: India Pictures
- Release date: 29 September 1946; (Cannes Film Festival)
- Running time: 122 minutes
- Country: India
- Language: Hindi

Neecha Nagar

Neecha Nagar (lit. 'Lowly City') is a 1946 Indian Hindi-language film, directed by Chetan Anand, written by Khwaja Ahmad Abbas and Hayatullah Ansari, and produced by Rashid Anwar and A. Halim. It was a pioneering effort in social realism in Indian cinema and led to many such parallel cinema films by other directors, many of them also written by Khwaja Ahmad Abbas. It starred Chetan Anand's wife Uma Anand, with Rafiq Anwar, Kamini Kaushal, Murad, Rafi Peer, Hamid Butt, and Zohra Sehgal. Neecha Nagar was a Hindi film adaptation in an Indian setting of Russian writer Maxim Gorky's 1902 play The Lower Depths.

Neecha Nagar became the first Indian film to gain recognition at the Cannes Film Festival, after it shared the Grand Prix du Festival International du Film (Best Film) award at the first Cannes Film Festival in 1946 with eleven of the eighteen entered feature films. It is the only Indian film to be ever awarded a Palme d'Or. Ironically, the film was never released in India. However the film was telecasted on Doordarshan, (India's national broadcaster) in 1980s.

== Overview ==
It was based on a Hindi story, Neecha Nagar, written by Hayatullah Ansari, which in turn was inspired by Gorky's The Lower Depths. It took an expressionist look at the gulf between the rich and poor in society.

Neecha Nagar was the debut film of actress Kamini Kaushal and Ravi Shankar as a music director.

== Production ==
The movie was financed and produced by the lead actor Rafiq Anwar's brother who had made money as a wrestler in England.

== Cast ==
- Rafiq Anwar as Balraj
- Uma Anand as Maya
- Kamini Kaushal as Rupa
- Murad as Hakim Yaqub Khan Sahab
- Rafi Peer as Sarkar
- S.P. Bhatia as Sagar
- Hamid Butt as Yaqoob Chacha
- Mohan Saigal as Raza
- Zohra Sehgal as Bhabi
- B. M. Vyas as Balraj's brother

== Soundtrack ==
The music of Neecha Nagar marked the film score debut of sitar maestro Ravi Shankar, who had become associated with the Indian People's Theatre Association (IPTA) after the closure of Uday Shankar's dance academy in Almora. The lyrics were written by Manmohan Anand and Vishwamitra Adil, and several of the songs drew on Hindustani classical and folk idioms, with two functioning as songs of protest within the film's social-realist narrative.

The soundtrack featured the playback singing debut of Lakshmi Shankar, Ravi Shankar's sister-in-law, who recorded the lullaby "So Na O Nanhi Sona" picturised on Kamini Kaushal. It also included one of the earliest film recordings of Geeta Dutt (then credited as Geeta Roy), who sang "Birha Ki Aag" in her first year as a playback singer, having made her Hindi cinema debut with Bhakta Prahlad earlier the same year.

1. "Utho Ke Hame Waqt Ki Gardish" – chorus
2. "Kab Tak Gahri Raat Rahegi" – Lakshmi Shankar
3. "Birha Ki Aag" – Geeta Dutt
4. "Dil Mein Samaake" – N/A
5. "Ek Nirali Jyot Bujhi Hai" – N/A
6. "Haiya Ho Haiya" – N/A
7. "Hum Rukenge Bhi Nahi" – N/A
8. "So Na O Nanhi" – Lakshmi Shankar

== Reception ==
According to film scholar Aruna Vasudev, the movie had unmistakable references to the British Government, Mahatma Gandhi, Jawaharlal Nehru, and the Indian elite epitomised in the daughter. Yet, the film censors at the time did not see it that way and passed it.

After production, movie could not find a distributor as it was a collaborative venture between a Hindu and Muslim in the wake of communal riots in post Indian independence. Eventually, it was shown in a small suburban theatre in Bombay where audience broke chairs and threw things on the screen. The movie was then withdrawn and never received a wide cinematic release. However, Nehru showed it at the First Asian Conference in Delhi for its delegates in 1949.

== Awards ==
1946 Cannes Film Festival

- Grand Prix du Festival International du Film
