= Abana (film) =

1958 Indian Sindhi-language film

- Directed by: Depk Asha; Arjen Khacharan
- Written by: Persam Zia; Parvo Wafa
- Starring: Sadhana Shivdasani
- Release date: 1958
- Country: India
- Language: Sindhi

Abana (lit. 'Native land') is a 1958 Indian Sindhi-language drama film directed by Arjun Hingorani and Dharam Kumar. It was the first Sindhi film to be released in independent India. Sadhana Shivdasani, a well-known actress in Indian films, played the lead role in this film and received only one rupee for it. In addition to him, the film starred Deepak Asha, Bhaji Advani, Master Shishil, Kan Mohen, and other actors. The film was directed by Depk Asha and Arjen Khacharan. Poets Persam Zia and Parvo Wafa wrote songs for the film, and Master Chander, Blushi Rani, Asen Mirani, Sarlsamthani, and Vija Gerbhasangi wrote the songs. The video of this film is available on DVD.

== Cast ==
- Sheila Ramani
- Kaan Mohan
- Sadhana

== See also ==
- Ekta (1942), the first Sindhi-language film
