= Mehboob Mitha =

- Directed by: A. Q. Pirzada
- Written by: Agha Saleem
- Produced by: G. S. Gurnani, Jhulelal Films
- Starring: Anila Niyaz, Mushtaque Changezi, Chakori, Kiran, Saqi
- Cinematography: Syed Rizvi
- Music by: Ghulam Ali
- Release date: 12 November 1971
- Country: Pakistan
- Language: Sindhi
- Box office: Rs. 0.003 crore (US$110)

Mehboob Mitha is a Pakistani film released on 12 November 1971. The Sindhi language film was directed by A. Q. Pirzada, produced by G. S. Gurnani (Jhulelal Films) and starred Anila Niyaz and Mushtaq Changezi.

== See also ==
- Sindhi cinema
- List of Sindhi-language films
