= Action Replayy =

2010 Indian film by Vipul Shah

- Theatrical release poster
- Directed by: Vipul Amrutlal Shah
- Written by: Suresh Nair; Aatish Kapadia
- Produced by: Vipul Amrutlal Shah
- Starring: Akshay Kumar; Aishwarya Rai Bachchan; Aditya Roy Kapur
- Cinematography: Sejal Shah
- Edited by: Amitabh Shukla
- Music by: Songs: Pritam; Background Score: Salim–Sulaiman
- Distributed by: PVR Pictures; Hari Om Entertainment; Sunshine Pictures
- Release date: 5 November 2010
- Running time: 129 minutes
- Country: India
- Language: Hindi
- Budget: ₹60 crore
- Box office: ₹48 crore

Action Replayy is a 2010 Indian Hindi-language science-fiction romantic comedy film directed by Vipul Amrutlal Shah starring Akshay Kumar, Aishwarya Rai Bachchan and Aditya Roy Kapur. Neha Dhupia, Rannvijay Singh, Om Puri, Kirron Kher and Rajpal Yadav play supporting roles in the film. The film is an uncredited remake of the 1985 film Back to the Future. Director Vipul Amrutlal Shah however insists that it is an adaptation of a Gujarati play of the same name, and of H. G. Wells' The Time Machine.

It follows a young man named Bunty, who enlists the help of his girlfriend's grandfather, a scientist, when his parents are about to divorce. With the help of a time machine created by the scientist, he travels back to 1975 when his parents were unmarried, and tries to make them fall in love.

The film was released theatrically on 5 November 2010, coinciding with Diwali.

== Plot ==
The story focuses on Bunty, who does not want to get married because of the loveless relationship between his parents. Bunty's girlfriend, Tanya, keeps proposing to him but he always rejects. She takes Bunty to her grandfather, Anthony Gonsalves, who happens to be a scientist and he is working on a time machine. Anthony asks Bunty why he refuses to get married. Bunty says that he is scared of marriage because his parents seem so unhappy with theirs.

On their 35th anniversary, Bunty's parents, Kishen and Mala get in an argument because of her friend Kundan. Kundan used to bully Kishen and tries to repeat it after all these years. Mala doesn't stop him, moreover laughs over Kishen along with her friends. This leads to a fight between Kishen and Mala and it goes too far that they decide to get a divorce. When Bunty hears this, he runs to Anthony's lab to use the time machine and go back in time, so that he can make his parents fall in love.

Without Anthony's supervision, Bunty enters the time machine and goes back to 1975, a time before his parents got married. He finds his grandfather's house, where he sees Kishen. Bunty realises that the younger Kishen was an unattractive, weak and socially awkward youth, whereas the younger Mala was attractive as well as spirited. Mala keeps making fun of Kishen. Bunty makes Kishen over into a 'cool dude' with the help of money he borrowed from younger Anthony. Mala's friend Mona falls in love with Bunty.

Bunty creates a plan to help Mala realise her love for Kishen. Meanwhile, Kundan also falls for Mala, making things more complicated. Bunty tells Kishen to ignore Mala, while she is becoming friendlier towards him. The plan succeeds in awakening Mala's feelings and she confesses her love for Kishen. She tells Mona about her feelings. However, Kishen and Mala's parents are against love marriages and, therefore, do not accept their relationship. So the lovers, helped by Bunty, decide to elope. Kundan takes Mala's mother Bholi Devi and servant Bhikhu, along with Kishen's father Rai Bahadur, to chase the love birds.

At the end of the chase, Kishen slaps Kundan for his bad behaviour. Their parents accept Kishen and Mala's relationship. Mona proposes to Bunty but he tells her that he loves another woman, who is waiting for him. Bunty then uses the time machine to return to the future. As expected, his parents are deeply in love with each other. But, unexpectedly, Mona and Kundan are also married to each other. Bunty then takes Tanya aside, proposes to her, and she accepts happily.

== Cast ==
- Akshay Kumar as Kishan Kumar Chopra
- Aishwarya Rai Bachchan as Mala Malhotra Chopra
- Aditya Roy Kapur as Bunty Chopra, Mala and Kishen's son
- Neha Dhupia as Mona / Maa Jogeshwari, Mala's best friend and Kundan's wife in the changed future
- Sudeepa Singh as Tanya Gonsalves, Bunty's girlfriend
- Om Puri as Rai Bahadur Dhyanchand Chopra, Kishen's father, Bunty's grandfather
- Kirron Kher as Bholi Devi Malhotra, Mala's mother, Bunty's grandmother
- Rannvijay Singh as Kundanlal "Kundan" Kapoor, a singer who can mimic the male and female voices, changed in the changed future
- Rajpal Yadav as Bhiku, an arrogant servant of Kishen, who has a changed attitude in the changed future
- Randhir Kapoor as Professor Anthony Gonsalves, Tanya's grandfather
- Gopi Bhalla as Fruit Vendor
- Vikas Shrivastav as Raman Raghav

== Production ==
Filming scheduled for Manali in July 2010 was rescheduled when landslides blocked the roads near Rohtang Pass and the crew was evacuated by the army. Akshay Kumar's hairstyle was inspired by Sunil Dutt's long-haired look from Zakhmee (1975).

== Reception ==
=== Critical reception ===
Action Replayy was panned by critics. Rajeev Masand of CNN-IBN rated it 1.5/5: "Sorely lacking in drama and genuine humour, Action Replayy is mind-numbingly dull because there's no conflict or plot progression, and everything seems to fall into place too conveniently". Mayank Shekhar of Hindustan Times rated it 1/5 "Scenes may well be dull and weak in parts. And they are. But for a musical, the soundtrack is pure third rate". Raja Sen of Rediff rated it 1/5: "This is, first and foremost, a tacky film. The tastelessness flowing right down into the script, however, makes for a very different league of disaster". Taran Adarsh of Bollywood Hungama rated it 3/5: "Action Replayy is a light-hearted rom-com that should be viewed without really seeking much rationale or logic behind every action and reaction". Nikhat Kazmi of The Times of India rated it 2.5/5: "Action Replayy needed a much smarter script to keep the laughter ringing". Sarita Tanwar of Mid-Day rated it 2.5/5: "Watch it for the effort and for Akshay-Aishwarya's crackling chemistry."

=== Box office ===
The film ultimately grossed ₹480 million.

== Awards and nominations ==
2011 Zee Cine Awards

Nominated

- Best Male Playback Singer – Daler Mehndi for "Zor Ka Jhatka"
- Best Female Playback Singer – Richa Sharma for "Zor Ka Jhatka"

== Music ==
Action Replayy

Soundtrack album by Pritam
- Released: 2010
- Genre: Film soundtrack
- Label: T-Series
- Producer: Pritam

Pritam chronology
Badmaash Company (2010)	Action Replayy (2010)	No Problem (2010)

The film score was composed by Salim–Sulaiman, while the songs and four remixes were by Pritam and lyrics were penned by Irshad Kamil.

=== Track listing ===
No.	Title	Singer	Length
1	"Zor Ka Jhatka"	Daler Mehndi, Richa Sharma	4:09
2	"O Bekhabar"	Shreya Ghoshal	4:29
3	"Nakhre"	Francois Castellino	5:34
4	"Chhan Ke Mohalla"	Sunidhi Chauhan, Ritu Pathak	5:16
5	"Tera Mera Pyaar"	Karthik, Mahalakshmi Iyer, Antara Mitra	5:57
6	"Dhak Dhak Dhak"	Mika Singh	4:14
7	"Luk Chup Jaana"	KK, Tulsi Kumar	4:22
8	"I've Turned Down Crazy"	Suraj Jagan	3:26
9	"Baaki Main Bhool Gayi"	Shreya Ghoshal	3:43
10	"Zor Ka Jhatka" (remix)	Master Saleem, Richa Sharma, Tiger Style	3:54
11	"Chhan Ke Mohalla" (remix)	Sunidhi Chauhan, Ritu Pathak, Tiger Style	4:49
12	"Tera Mera Pyaar" (remix)	Karthik, Antara Mitra, Hysinth	5:57
13	"Nakhre" (remix)	Francois Castellino, Dj A-Myth	5:02
Total length:	1:00:52		

== See also ==
- Time Machine (unfinished film), an unreleased Indian film by Shekhar Kapur based on Back to the Future
