= Tuhinje Pyaar Mein =

Indian Sindhi-language drama film

- Directed by: Deepak Tripathi
- Written by: Kishor Lalwani
- Release date: 11 January 2019
- Running time: 160 minutes
- Country: India
- Language: Sindhi

Tuhinje Pyaar Mein (English: In your love) is a 2019 Indian Sindhi-language romantic drama film directed by Deepak Tripathi and written by Kishor Lalwani. The film was released on 11 January 2019.

== Cast ==
- Om Praksh Asudani as Vishal
- Dristi Aswani as Ashu
- Srichand Makhija as Dwarkadas
- Seema Motwani as Reshma
- Jatin Udasi as Rishi

== See also ==
- List of Sindhi-language films
