= Sindhi cinema =

Sindhi-language film industry

- No. of screens: 57 (2023)
- Main distributors: Various local distributors

Sindhi cinema refers to the Sindhi language film industry in Sindh, Pakistan and among the Sindhi diaspora specially in India.

== History ==
The first Sindhi film was Ekta produced by Raes Karim Bux Nizamani in 1940 while it was directed by Homi Wadia; while the first Sindhi film produced in Pakistan was Umar Marvi in 1956 directed by Shaikh Hassan. The first blockbuster Sindhi film released was Abana in 1958 in India. Sindhi cinema used to see three to four releases a year until the 1990s. The last Sindhi film of note in Pakistan was Himmat in 1997.

=== Issues ===
Satish Anand said that the condition of the theatres is bad, funding is difficult and people prefer mainstream cinema. Many producers have tried to revive the industry but eventually it fell apart. An alternate model of releasing films only on television and home video was attempted, but that too didn't work because of rampant piracy.

== Films ==
Some notable Sindhi films include:

- Ekta (1942)
- Umar Marvi (1956)
- Abana (1958)
- Perdesi (1960)
- Sherah Feroz (1968)
- Chanduki (1969)
- Ghoonghat Lah Kunwar (1970)
- Mehboob Mitha (1971)
- Pyar Kare Dis (2007)
- Tuhinje Pyaar Mein (2019)
- Byo Cha Khape (2025)

== Actors ==
- Bhagwanti Navani
- Bhudo Advani
- Chakori
- Danish Nawaz
- Fahad Mustafa
- Hari Shivdasani
- Jiten Lalwani
- Menaka Lalwani
- Mushtaque Changezi
- Preeti Jhangiani
- Sadhana Shivdasani
- Salahuddin Tunio
- Sanam Baloch
- Sheila Ramani
- Uroosa Siddiqui

== See also ==
- Cinema of Pakistan
- Cinema of India
- Sindhis in India
