= Chakori (actress) =

Pakistani actress (1947–2010)

- چڪوري
- Born: Khawar Sultana; 1947; Hyderabad, Sindh
- Died: 2 November 2010 (aged 62–63); Lahore, Pakistan
- Occupation: Film actress
- Spouse(s): Mushtaque Changezi; Kaifee

Chakori (Sindhi: چڪوري), a.k.a. Chakori Begum (1947 – 2 November 2010), was a film actress from Sindh, Pakistan. She worked in Sindhi, Punjabi and Urdu films until the 1990s.

== Early life ==
Her real name was Khawar Sultana. She was born in 1947 in Hyderabad, Sindh, to a famous dancer Surieyaya. Whereas, according to her family, she was born in Gujrat, India. She was famous for her role Daro Natni in Maula Jatt (1979 film).

== Career ==
Chakori's was introduced in Sindhi cinema film Shehro Feroz in 1968, later her movie was Mehboob Mitha of Sindhi cinema, which was released in 1971. This movie was directed by A.Q Peerzado and musician was J.S Gorchani. Chakori worked in this movie as a side heroine. Later she did Urdu film Janwar in 1972 and Punjabi film Kon Sharif Kon Badmash in 1977. Meanwhile, she did the movie Piyaar taa'n Sadqay under the direction of Babu Bhai. Then she met actor Mushtaq Changezi, and married him in spite of disapproval/opposition by her mother Suraiya. Chakori married with Mushtaq Changezi in the court. After some time, this couple went to Lahore; they separated and got divorced there. Chakori was given new movie work in Lahore, and she did not return with her husband Mushtaque Changezi to Hyderabad. They quarreled and Mushtaq was sent to jail, and the noted actor Mustafa Qureshi helped Mushtaque Changezi in his release from the jail. Chakori married second time with director and actor Kaifee.

== Filmography ==
Chakori worked in Sindhi cinema, her movies were Jeejal Maau (English: Beloved Mother), Sodha Putr Sindh Ja, Muhinjo Piyar Pukary, Sindhiri taa Sadaqy, Acch ta Bhakur payoon. Raat'u aen Ajrak,۽ ’رت ۽ اجرڪ‘ Her Urdu and Punjabi movies were Maula Jatt, Hera Pheiri, Koounj, Takarao, Dangal, Permit, Badmashi Banda. She worked in these movies with various actors including Mushtaq Changezi, Kaifee, Sultan Raahi, Badar Muneer, Mustafa Qureshi, Shahid, Muhammad Ali, Yousuf Khan, Ghulam Muhiuddin, Anjuman, Saima, Rani, Aasia, Naghma and Aliya.

== Death ==
Chakori died due to asthma, diabetes and heart disease on 2 November 2010 in Lahore, Pakistan, She is buried in Lahore.Pakistan
