= Naukri (1954 film) =

1954 Indian Hindi-language film by Bimal Roy

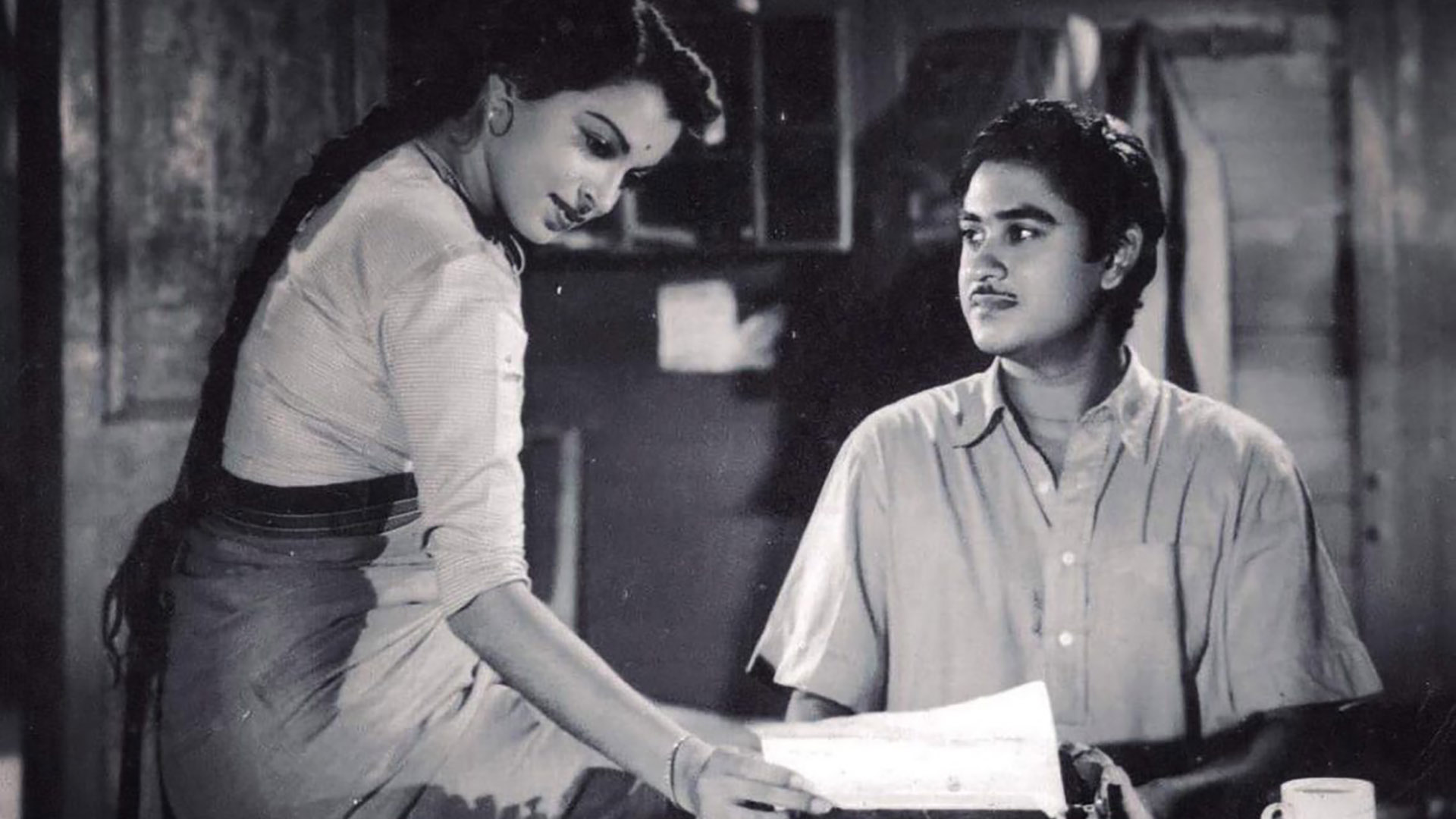
- A scene of Naukri
- Directed by: Bimal Roy
- Written by: Paul Mahendra
- Screenplay by: Nabendu Ghosh
- Story by: Subodh Basu
- Produced by: Bimal Roy
- Starring: Kishore Kumar; Sheila Ramani; Achla Sachdev; Mehmood; Kanhaiyalal; Jagdeep
- Cinematography: Kamal Bose
- Edited by: Hrishikesh Mukherjee
- Music by: Salil Chowdhury; Shailendra (lyrics)
- Production company: Mohan Studios
- Distributed by: Bimal Roy Productions
- Release date: 1954
- Running time: 126 mins
- Country: India
- Language: Hindi

Naukri (transl. Job) is a 1954 Indian Hindi-language film directed by Bimal Roy for Bimal Roy Productions. The lead actors were Kishore Kumar and Sheila Ramani. This film is about the dreams and aspirations of the educated youth getting shattered as they struggle in the city for employment, in the ensuing years after India attained independence. Naukri and Baap Beti (1954) are cited as "sensitive" and "memorable" films from Roy. In Naukri, Bimal Roy tackles yet another social problem, this time involving unemployment. Naukri is one of the earliest films where Kishore Kumar first gained prominence. Since his comic persona had not yet fully developed, Naukri sees a sincere, sensitive and restrained performance from him.

== Plot ==
Rattan Kumar Chowdhury (Kishore Kumar) stays with his widowed mother (Achala Sachdev) and sick sister, Uma (Noor Mahal) in the village. He is waiting for his college results. He dreams about the day when he has a job, a house and can find a good groom for his sister, and look after his mother. He narrates his dreams to his beloved sister in a beautiful song. She smiles happily and joins him in the song.

Rattan passes his BA and leaves for Calcutta where his father's colleague had promised him a job where his father had worked. In Calcutta, he takes up boarding in a lodge where he is neighbor to three other unemployed youths (one of whom is Iftekhar) in the "Bekar" (unemployed/without work) wing of the lodge. At his father's office, he finds out the manager has given the job to a relative. Rattan doesn't give up and perseveres applying wherever he can.

His sister, suffering from TB, is put on the waiting list at the sanatorium. Meanwhile, in Calcutta, Ratan also finds love with Seema (Sheila Ramani) who stays in the house in the next compound - much to her father's chagrin, who wants a son-in-law with a good job. Rattan woos her by singing romantically outside his window, and Seema listens from her window. She is attracted. Her father keeps intruding into her room, closing the window, etc. to prevent this romance.

Rattan struggles to get a job but to no avail. One day, even as he gets the news that his sister has been accepted at the sanatorium, he gets a telegram informing of her death. He is shocked and depressed, and his fellow lodgers console him.

One of the other unemployed youths in the lodge, Shankar, goes through similar misfortunes. He tries to kill himself, but Rattan stops him. Shankar gets a job later and is grateful to Rattan.

Rattan finally gets a job in Bombay. He writes a good newsletter to Seema and encloses his appointment letter an envelope. He puts it in her letterbox, to prove he has now got a job. The old man intercepts the letter, but his wife requests him not to open a private letter. The old man, thinking that an unemployed Rattan is wooing his daughter, burns the letter. Seema is unaware of all this. Rattan encounters her and finds out that she did not receive the letter. He confronts her father, who tells him that he burned it. A shocked Rattan tells him that he had an appointment letter in it and that he has a job in Bombay. Her father now changes his attitude and apologizes. Rattan has to leave for Bombay, but he cannot remember the name of the company. Seema's father tells him that the appointment letter that he had must have come in an envelope with the details. When Rattan returns to his apartment, he finds that his man-servant has thrown it away into the garbage can! Rattan now decides that he will just travel to Bombay and search for the company.

Rattan reaches Bombay. He constantly tries to remember the name of the company. As he walks along the various streets of Bombay, there are a bewildering number of company buildings, all looking alike. He keeps asking various locals about a company whose name he cannot remember! A pickpocket (Mehmood) and his partner steal his wallet. As Rattan realizes that, he shouts for the police and a crowd gathers. However, the pickpocket has thrown the wallet to his partner who has run away. So the pickpocket claims innocence. The policeman takes both to the police station. The police inspector suspects Rattan, as he has no documents to prove that he has a job. Rattan pleads and cajoles, but to no avail. He is confined to a cell, along with the pickpocket. At night in the cell, he suddenly remembers the name of the company. He spends the whole night without sleep, and when the police inspector arrives in the morning, he eagerly tells him.

Thus, he ultimately makes his way to the company. He tells the officer about the appointment letter. The officer asks him why he's a day late. Rattan narrates his travails. The officer sympathizes but then tells him that the job has been given to another person since he did not turn up the previous day. Rattan breaks down. Seeing his plight, the officer arranges a job for him.

Rattan is a good worker. One day he helps an old colleague who is asked to work overtime by their supervisor. He takes the old man's work on himself. But he makes some mistake. The next day the supervisor fires the old man for the mistake. Rattan takes up the side of the old man, saying it was he who made the mistake. The manager fires him. All his colleagues are agitated, and they assure him that they will cajole the supervisor to take him back.

Meanwhile, Seema runs away from Calcutta to be with Rattan in Bombay. He cannot bring himself to tell her he is jobless. He tries to commit suicide, but Seema stops him and they decide they will face life together. The story ends on a poignant yet hopeful note.

== Cast ==
- Kishore Kumar – Rattan Kumar Chowdhury
- Sheila Ramani – Seema
- Kanhaiyalal – Hari
- Achala Sachdev – Ratan's Mother
- Noor Mahal - Uma (Ratan's Sister)
- Krishnakant as Poet tenant
- Iftekhar as tenant
- Moni Chatterjee as Lodge manager
- S.N. Banerjee as Head clerk in Pioneer Trading
- Mehmood – Pickpocketer
- Jagdeep – Lalu Ustad (Boot Polish Man)

== Crew ==
- Director - Bimal Roy
- Producer - Bimal Roy
- Story - Subodh Basu
- Screenplay - Nabendu Ghosh
- Dialogue - Paul Mahendra
- Cinematography - Kamal Bose
- Music - Salil Choudhury
- Lyrics - Shailendra
- Editing - Hrishikesh Mukherjee
- Studio - Mohan Studios

== Music ==
Salil Chowdhury, the music director and Roy were not convinced about Kishore Kumar's singing potential at the time, and according to Bharatan, Kumar was taken on reluctantly as a singer.

One of the notable songs from the film was "Ek Chhoti Si Naukri Ka Talabgaar Hoon Main", sung by Kishore Kumar, Shyamal Mitra and Shankar Dasgupta, which reflected the young men's search for jobs. The other songs of note were "Arzi Hamaari Yeh Marzi Hamaari" and "Chhota Sa Ghar Hoga", both sung by Kumar.

The lyricist was Shailendra, and the other singers were Hemant Kumar, Shankar Dasgupta, Shyamal Mitra, Lata Mangeshkar, Geeta Dutt and Shaila Belle. The harmonica in "Chota Sa Ghar Hoga" was played by the popular Bengali harmonica player Milon Gupta.

=== Song list ===
Song	Singer(s)
"Chhota Sa Ghar Hoga" (Happy)	Kishore Kumar, Shaila Belle
"Chhota Sa Ghar Hoga" (Sad)	Hemant Kumar
"Ek Chhoti Si Naukri Ka Talabgaar Hoon"	Kishore Kumar, Shankar Dasgupta, Shyamal Mitra
"Arzi Hamaari Yeh Marzi Hamaari"	Kishore Kumar
"Jhoome Re Kali Bhanvara Ulajh Gaya"	Geeta Dutt
"O Man Re Na Gham Kar"	Lata Mangeshkar

== Trivia ==
In this movie, a live-in relationship has been shown, albeit in different circumstances between Rattan and Seema. This facet was unheard of in those times.

Noor Mahal who plays Rattan's sister in this movie, has appeared in movie Anmol Ghadi as young Lata.
