= Hayatullah Ansari =

Indian politician

Member of Parliament, Rajya Sabha
- In office 27 September 1982 – 26 September 1988
- Constituency: Nominated

Personal details
- Born: 1912 Firang Mahal, Lucknow, British India
- Died: 1999 (aged 86–87)
- Education: Aligarh Muslim University
- Occupation: Author, Journalist and Politician
- Awards: Sahitya Akademi Award

Hayatullah Ansari (1912–1999) was an Indian author, journalist and politician from Uttar Pradesh. He jointly wrote the script of Chetan Anand's Neecha Nagar along with Khwaja Ahmad Abbas and also served in the selection board of the Jnanpith Award.

== Early life ==
Hayatullah Ansari was born at Firangi Mahal, Lucknow. His father was Waheedullah Ansari. He was initially educated through the Madarassa itself and earned the degree of "uloom-e- shiqiya" from this institution. After schooling he joined the Aligarh Muslim University where he got his bachelor's degree. In Aligarh he came in contact with the leftist progressive writers. He was influenced by them and this is reflected in his short stories which reflect his socialist bent of mind. After his return to Lucknow he came into contact with Gandhian philosophy and also served a term at the "Sevagram" Gandhi's Ashram. He was initially associated with the Progressive Literature movement and was editor of the weekly Hindustan and Sab Saath for some time. Subsequently, he became the editor of Congress Party's official newspaper Qaumi Awaz which he served with dedication for several years and took it to great heights. Qaumi Awaaz became one of the most important Urdu dailies to be published from northern India. In 1938 he founded the All India Taleem Ghar in Lucknow which trains teachers in Urdu.

== Literary career ==
He was accepted as a reputable short story writer of Urdu. His first short story was published in the June 1930 issue of the Jamia. Nine years later his first collection of short stories called Anokhi Musibat was published in 1939. After a gap of 7 years, two collections of short stories followed in quick succession. Bhare Bazar Mein in 1946 and Shikasta Kagure in 1947. About his art as a short story writer, Ali Jawad Zaidi says "his stories develop with a natural ease and give lively portrayals of human suffering and aspiration. Some stories excel in the psychoanalytical technique. Aakhri Koshish is easily the most acclaimed of his short stories." His voluminous Urdu novel Lahoo ke Phool based on the history of India's freedom struggle was published in 1969 for which was awarded the Sahitya Akademi Award in 1970. Besides this he wrote a novel titled Madaar. He also pursued the cause of Urdu at various forums and did substantial work for the development of the language.

== Politics ==
He was a member of the Uttar Pradesh Legislative Council (1952–66) and was nominated as member of the Rajya Sabha in 1982 and served till 1988.

== Legacy ==
In 2013 museum named after him was inaugurated by former chief minister Narayan Datt Tiwari at the premises of Madrasa Hayatul Uloom, Farangi Mahal.

== Sources ==
- Brief Biodata
