= Chanduki =

- Directed by: A. Q. Pirzada
- Written by: Agha Saleem
- Produced by: S. Y. A. Group
- Starring: Meh Parah, Mushtaque Changezi, Qurban Jilani, Khurshid Kanul
- Cinematography: M. Hussain
- Music by: Ghulam Nabi Abdul Lateef
- Release date: 1969
- Country: Pakistan
- Language: Sindhi

Chanduki (Sindhi: چانڊوڪي) is a Pakistani Sindhi film released in 1969. It is directed by A. Q. Pirzada, produced by S. Y. A. Group, and stars Mushtaq Changezi.

== See also ==
- Sindhi cinema
- List of Sindhi-language films
