= Usman Peerzada =

Pakistani actor, director and producer

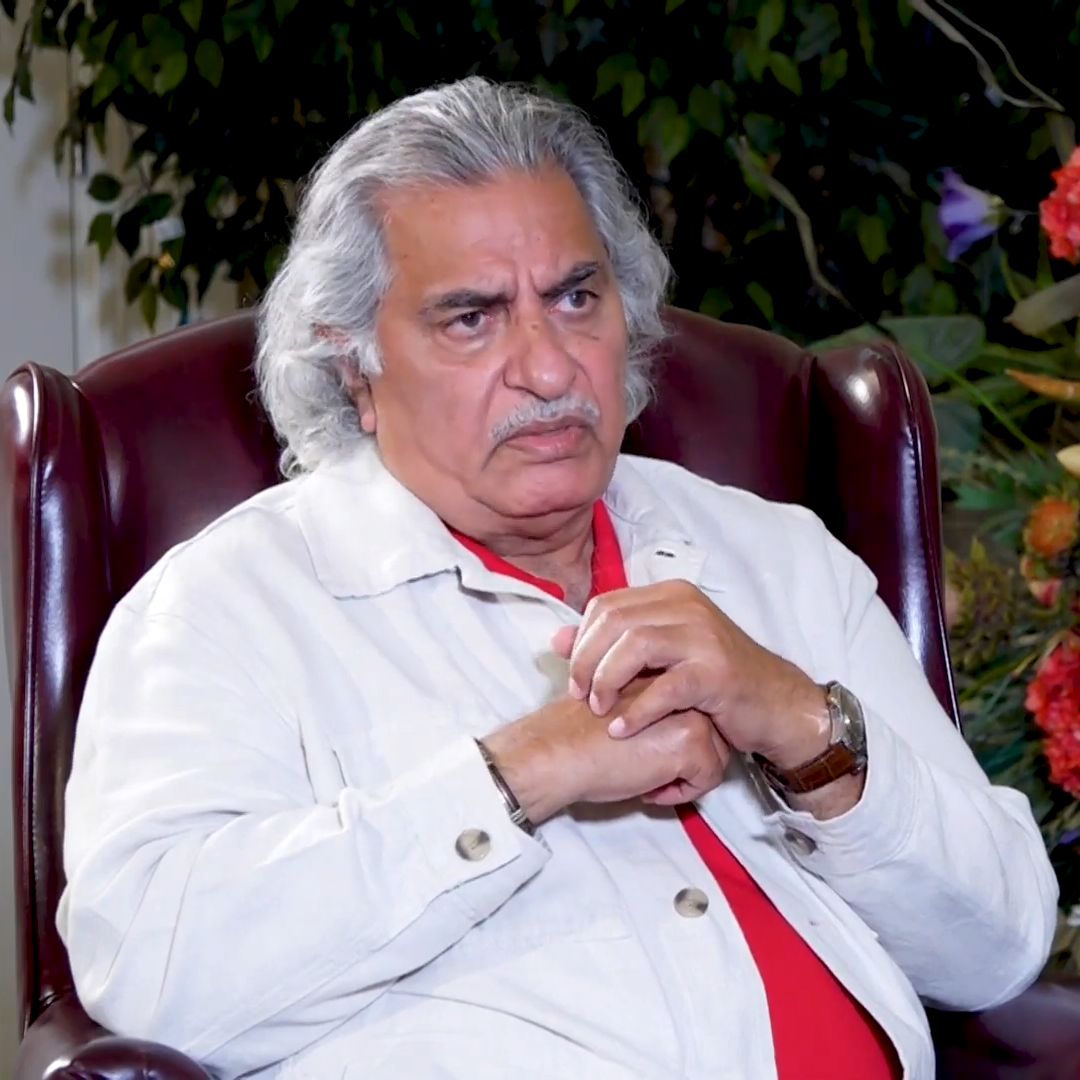
- Usman Peerzada in 2022
- Born: Syed Mohammad Usman Shah Peerzada; 24 May 1951 (age 75); Lahore, Punjab, Pakistan
- Other name: Usman Pirzada
- Education: Government College University
- Occupations: Actor; director; producer; screenwriter
- Years active: 1974–present
- Spouse: Samina Peerzada (m. 1975)
- Children: 2
- Parent: Rafi Peer (father)
- Relatives: Faizaan Peerzada (brother); Zara Peerzada (niece)
- Awards: PTV Award winner in 2023

Usman Peerzada (Urdu: عثمان پیرزادہ) (born 24 May 1951) is a Pakistani actor, director, producer and screenwriter.

He has acted in many Punjabi and Urdu films and serials, including Beyond the Last Mountain and Kahi Unkahi.

He is best known for portrayal of Prince Salim in drama Nangay Paoon.

== Early life and education ==
Usman was born in Lahore in 1951 into a Punjabi family involved in the performing arts: His father Rafi Peer (1898–1974) was an actor and playwright who pioneered theatre in Pakistan, his legacy in theatre being continued by Usman's brother Saadaan Peerzada; his other brothers Salmaan Peerzada and Imran Peerzada are active in cinema and on television as actors and filmmakers, his sister Tasneem Peerzada is an Urdu journalist specialized in culture, while yet another brother, Faizaan Peerzada (1958–2012), was an artist and a puppeteer.

He studied in St. Anthony's High School and then graduated in MA English in 1974 from Government College University (GCU).

== Career ==
=== Actor ===
Usman started his acting career from his college in 1974 in different plays and dramatic festivals. In 1976, he got an offer for the lead role in Pakistan's first English-language film, Beyond the Last Mountain.

=== Director and producer ===
Usman has directed, produced, written and acted in the Urdu-language movie Nazdeekiyan in 1986 and also directed, produced, written and acted in the Punjabi-language movie Gori Dyan Jhanjran in 1989, both receiving critical acclaim. In order to finance Nazdeekiyan he sold off his cars, but it eventually turned out to be a hit at the box-office.

In television he directed and wrote the PTV drama Sofia (1992), co-starring his wife Samina and which became popular.

In 1997, he directed the movie Karz, with the script written by Khalil-ur-Rehman Qamar, which remains the last movie he has directed.

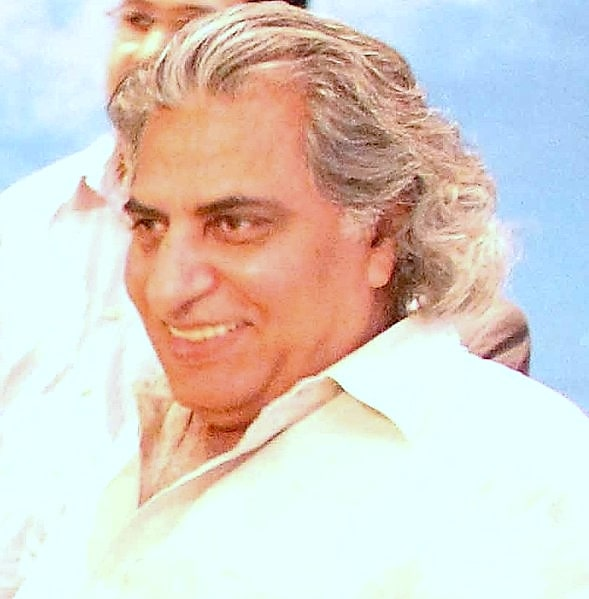
Usman Peerzada in 2012

In 2010, he directed and wrote the drama Rangeel Pur for PTV Home, the cast including his niece Yamina Peerzada.

In 2016, he announced that he would adapt his father Rafi Peer's play Namoos into a movie that he would direct.

== Personal life ==
Peerzada married actress and director Samina Peerzada in 1975.

They have two children Anum and Amal Peerzada, Amal being a miniature artist.

== Filmography ==
=== Films ===
Year	Film	Director	Screenwriter	Producer	Language
1976	Beyond the Last Mountain				English
1976	Sazish				Urdu
1977	Goonj				Urdu
1978	Parakh				Urdu
1978	Aali Jah				Punjabi
1978	Kall day Munday				Punjabi
1978	Accident				Urdu
1978	Shola				Punjabi
1979	Nei Tehzeeb				Urdu
1979	Nazr-e-Karm				Urdu
1979	Main Chup Rahun Gi				Urdu
1979	Aurat Raj				Urdu
1979	Miss Hong Kong				Urdu
1982	Wehshi Daku				Punjabi
1986	Nazdeekian	Yes	Yes		Urdu
1990	Gori Dian Jhanjhran	Yes	Yes		Punjabi
1991	Chann Meray				Punjabi
1997	Karz	Yes			Urdu
1997	Zar Gul			Yes	Urdu
2003	Shararat				Urdu

=== Television series ===
Year	Title	Role	Director	Screenwriter	Network
1980	Teesra Kinara	Raheel Obaid			PTV
1981	Chabi Aur Chabiyan	Ibrahim			PTV
1982	Nishan-e-Haider	Colonel Adam Khan			PTV
1983	Darya	Shah Mureed			PTV
1983	Nangay Paoon	Prince Salim			PTV
1983	Picnic	Amir			PTV
1983	Wadi-e-Purkhar	Naseer Aldeen			PTV
1984	Status	Ahsan Ali Khan			PTV
1985	Saahil	Zaheer			PTV
1986	Jungle	Sarang			PTV
1989	Hisaar	Tariq Ahmed			PTV
1991	Karrobi	Asad			PTV
1992	Sofia	Umar	Yes	Yes	PTV
1995	Dastak Aur Darwaza	Ahmed Hasan			PTV
2004	Qurban Tere Ishq Pe	Shaheen			PTV
2009	Ishq Ki Inteha	Malik Jalal			Geo TV
2010	Rangeel Pur	Shah Ji	Yes	Yes	PTV Home
2011	Nail Polish	Bedaar Alam			A-Plus
2012	Kahi Unkahi	Kamal			Hum TV
2013	Majazi Khuda	Minal's father			Geo TV
2013	Numm	Sikander Bakht			Geo Entertainment
2014	Zid	Qasim			Hum TV
2014	Ladoon Mein Pali	Farooq			Geo TV
2014	Goya	Rahat Hasmi			ARY Digital
2016	Tum Milay	Mirza			ARY Digital
2016	Shaam Dhaley	Alina's father			Geo TV
2016	Khuda Aur Muhabbat (season 2)	Amjad Raza			Geo TV
2017	Tau Dil Ka Kia Hua	Maya's father			Hum TV
2017	Dil-e-Jaanam	Rehman			Hum TV
2017	Alif Allah Aur Insaan	Hashmat Malik			Hum TV
2018	Noor Bibi	Rabia's father			Geo Entertainment
2018	Seep	Nawab Waqar Ahmed			TV One
2019	Abba	Pehlwan Ji			PTV
2019	Muthi Bhar Chahat	Chaudhry Sikandar Hayat			Express Entertainment
2019	Ruswai	Ariz Khan			ARY Digital
2021	Khuda Aur Muhabbat Season 3	Kazim Shah			Geo Entertainment
2021	Berukhi	Agha Jaan			ARY Digital
2021	Ishq E Laa	Ghiyas Ahmad			Hum TV
2021	Sinf-e-Aahan	Mahjabeen's father			ARY Digital
2022	Dikhawa Season 3	Akmal			Geo Entertainment
2022	Chaudhry and Sons	Professor Bakht			Geo Entertainment
2023	Heer Da Hero	Inayat Jatt			Geo Entertainment
2023	Jhoom	Toqeer			Geo Entertainment
2023	College Gate	Qamar Zaman			Green Entertainment
2023	Honey Moon	Shabir			Green Entertainment
2023	Gumn	Shakir Hussain			Green Entertainment
2023	Mein	Jaffar			ARY Digital
2023	Sukoon	Amjad			ARY Digital
2023	Standup Girl	Kabir's father			Green Entertainment
2024	Ghaata	Nihal			Geo Entertainment
2024	Kaffara	Tahir			Geo Entertainment
2025	Dayan	Dr. Naved			Geo Entertainment
2025	Main Manto Nahin Hoon	Mr. Dean			ARY Digital
2026	Nashtar	Dastoor Ali Khan			Geo Entertainment

=== Telefilms ===
Year	Title	Role
2002	Chor Dou	Manzoor
2013	Abhi Tou Main Jawan Hoon	Zehra's father
2021	Teri Meri Kahani	Jalal
2023	Yeh Tou 2 Much Hogaya	Taimoor Malik

== Awards and nominations ==
Year	Award	Category	Result	Title	Ref.
2018	CPACT Awards	Best Iconic Couple Award	Won	—N/a	
2023	PTV Icon Awards	National Icon Awards	Won	Contribution to Cinema	
