= Baadal Aain Barsat =

Sindhi cinema film

- Directed by: AQ Pirzadu
- Starring: A.R. Baloch
- Cinematography: A.K. M. Abbasi
- Music by: Ghulam Nabi-Abdul Latif
- Release date: 7 February 1975
- Country: Pakistan
- Language: Sindhi

Baadal Aain Barsat is a Sindhi film. It was the first presentation of the Sindh movies production, and was based on a love story. The film was released on 7 February 1975. The film was directed by AQ Pirzadu, composer Ghulam Nabi-Abdul Latif, and filmmaker A.K. M. Abbasi. The role of Wasim was played by actor A.R. Baloch in the film. The film was debuted at the Rahat Cinema Hyderabad and Shah Talkies Cinema Tando Adam along with Karachi Lighthouse, Khayam, and Sangeet Cinemania.

== Cast ==
Other actors were Qadu Sheedi, Abu-Balawal, Chingari, Shamsuddin, Rahim Shoro, Ishrat Hussein, Malik Anukho, Saad Qureshi, and Abdul Haq Abro.
