= Funtoosh =

- Poster
- Directed by: Chetan Anand; Vijay Anand (song sequences of "Ae Meri Topi Palatke Aa" & "Denewala Jab Bhi Deta")
- Written by: Story: Amarjeet (Credited as Amar Jeet); Screenplay: Uma Anand; Scenario & Dialogues: Chetan Anand
- Produced by: Dev Anand
- Starring: Dev Anand; Sheila Ramani; K. N. Singh
- Cinematography: Shyam Sunder Mallik
- Edited by: Mohammed Kasim
- Music by: S. D. Burman
- Distributed by: Navketan Films
- Release date: July 20, 1956
- Running time: 118 minutes
- Country: India
- Language: Hindi
- Box office: INR 90,000

Funtoosh is a 1956 Hindi film directed by Chetan Anand, except for two songs "Ae Meri Topi Palatke Aa" & "Denewala Jab Bhi Deta", picturized by Vijay Anand. The film stars Dev Anand, Sheila Ramani and K. N. Singh. It was the ninth highest-grossing film of 1956, and was declared a "Hit".

== Plot ==
Ram goes crazy after the death of his mother and sister, and once released from the mental hospital, he comes across Mr Kirorilal, who insures him and wants him dead for the money. However, Ram ends up marrying his daughter.

== Cast ==
- Dev Anand as Ram Lal "Funtoosh"
- Sheila Ramani as Neelu
- K.N. Singh as Karodimal
- Mehmood
- Vijay Anand as a struggling writer

== Soundtrack ==
The film music was composed by Sachin Dev Burman, assisted by his son R. D. Burman. When he was 17 years old, he composed the tune of "Ae Mere Topi Palat Ke Aa". The lyrics were by Sahir Ludhianvi.

Funtoosh

Soundtrack album by S. D. Burman
- Recorded: 1956
- Label: EMI Records
- Producer: Dev Anand

Song	Singer	Raga
"Ae Meri Topi Palatke Aa"	Kishore Kumar	
"Denewala Jab Bhi Deta"	Kishore Kumar	
"Dukhi Man Mere Sun"	Kishore Kumar	
"Woh Dekhe To Unki Inayat, Na Dekhe To Rona Kya"	Kishore Kumar, Asha Bhosle	Gaud Sarang
"Hamen Aaj Koi Na Chhediyo, Hamen Kisi Pe Dore Dalne Hai"	Kishore Kumar, Asha Bhosle	
"Phool Gendwa Na Maro"	Asha Bhosle	
"Pyar Ne Kitne Sapne Dekhe"	Asha Bhosle	
"Ae Jani, Jeene Mein Kya Hai"	Asha Bhosle	
