= Kaifi =

Pakistani film actor (1943–2009)

- Born: Kifayat Hussain Bhatti; 13 March 1943; Gujrat, Punjab British India
- Died: 13 March 2009 (aged 66); Lahore, Punjab, Pakistan
- Occupations: Actor; Director; Producer
- Years active: 1964 – 2004
- Spouse(s): Ghazala; Chakori Kaifee
- Relatives: Inayat Hussain Bhatti (brother); Waseem Abbas (nephew); Ali Abbas (grandnephew); Agha Ali (grandnephew)

Kaifi (born Kifayat Hussain Bhatti; 13 March 1943, Gujrat – 13 March 2009, Lahore) was a Pakistani film actor and a director.

He was the younger brother of the legendary Punjabi singer and actor Inayat Hussain Bhatti. Both brothers worked with each other to make some highly successful films in Pakistan.

Kaifee directed more than 30 films and acted in almost 100 films, with only two of his films as director being in Urdu language, Bikhray Moti (1975) and Roti, Kapra aur Insaan (1977).

His last film as an actor was Meri Hathjori (1989) while his last movie as a director was Maidan (2004).

== Career ==
After co-directing his brother Inayat's movie Waris Shah (1964), his first film as an independent film director was Munhzor (1966), which was a silver jubilee hit film, while his second film Chann Makhna (1968) became a super hit golden jubilee film. In the same year, he introduced himself as a film hero in film Sajjan Pyara (1968). His third film was Jind Jan (1969). Ishq Deevana (1971) was another golden jubilee film and his film Zulm da Badla (1972) celebrated diamond jubilee.

== Personal life ==
Kaifee was married to film actress Ghazala in the 1970s, and their son Amir Kaifi became an actor.

He later married actress Chakori and their sons Hasan Kaifi and Asad Kaifi are both active in the entertainment industry. Hasan Kaifi passed away on October 9, 2026.

== Death ==
He died in Lahore, Pakistan on his birthday on 13 March 2009 at the age of 66.

== Selected filmography ==
Year	Title	Actor	Director	Language	Note
1966	Munhzor	No	Yes	Punjabi	Debut film as director
1968	Sajjan Pyara	Yes	Yes	Punjabi	Debut film as actor
1968	Chann Makhna	No	Yes	Punjabi	Golden Jubilee super hit film
1969	Jind Jan	Yes	Yes	Punjabi	Super hit
1970	Dunya Matlab Di	Yes	No	Punjabi	Hit
1970	Sajjan Beli	Yes	No	Punjabi	Average
1971	Wehshi	Yes	No	Urdu	Hit
1971	Ishq Deevana	Yes	No	Punjabi	Hit film
1972	Zulm Da Badla	Yes	Yes	Punjabi	Super hit Diamond jubilee film
1975	Bikhray Moti	Yes	Yes	Urdu	Average
1977	Roti, Kapra Aur Insan	Yes	Yes	Urdu	Average, also producer
1979	Maula Jatt	Yes	No	Punjabi	Super hit
1985	Shah Behram	Yes	Yes	Punjabi	Average
1989	Meri Hathjori	Yes	No	Punjabi	Last film as actor
2004	Maidan	No	Yes	Punjabi	Last film as director
