= Rafi Peer =

Pakistani actor (1898–1974)

- Born: Rafi Peerzada Shah; 21 March 1898; Rawalpindi, Punjab, British India
- Died: 11 April 1974 (aged 76); Lahore, Pakistan
- Resting place: Lahore
- Other name: Rafi Peerzada
- Education: King's College, Cambridge
- Alma mater: Heidelberg University
- Occupations: Actor; Director; Playwright; Radio Artist; Voice Actor
- Years active: 1922 – 1974
- Spouse: Ismat Peerzada (wife)
- Children: Usman Peerzada (son); Faizan Peerzada (son)
- Relatives: Samina Peerzada (daughter-in-law)
- Honours: Pride of Performance (1967)

Rafi Peerzada Shah, also known as Rafi Peer (21 March 1898 – 11 April 1974) was a Pakistani actor, playwright, and director. Rafi was a leading intellectual and playwright who helped shape the modern drama tradition in the subcontinent. He is considered one of the founders of modern drama in the country and with his background in Western theatre, he significantly influenced the development of Pakistani performing arts.

== Early life and education ==
Rafi was born in Rawalpindi and grew up in Lahore. He studied at Government College, Lahore and during his time at this institution, Peer became involved with the Khilafat Movement and the All-India Muslim League. He also began his initial work as a writer.

His father, Pir Taj-ud-Din, was a respected lawyer in the High Court and a leading intellectual involved in the political awakening of the subcontinent. Peer came from a family of intellectuals and was associated with key figures in the Pakistan Movement, such as Muhammad Ali Jinnah and Allama Muhammad Iqbal.

In 1916, he went to England to study law at King's College, Cambridge. His proud Indian heritage led to friction with his British rulers, culminating in a scuffle that ended his time there after three years.

After studying law in England, he went to Germany and attended Heidelberg University there he studied philosophy; he wrote plays in multiple languages, including Sanskrit, Punjabi, Urdu, English, and German. He moved permanently to Germany in the early 1920s, he met Austrian-American director Max Reinhardt, a pioneer of modern European drama. Impressed by Reinhardt's work, Peer chose to abandon his conservative family's expectations for a conventional career and trained with Reinhardt to become an actor. This experience provided him with an extensive knowledge of Western theater.

== Career ==
=== Theatre ===
After studying theatre in Berlin under renowned European director Max Reinhardt in the 1920s, Peerzada returned to India in the 1930s to teach, act, and direct at the Indian Academy of Dramatic Arts. He became a central figure in developing contemporary national theatre, which combined modern European and traditional Indian theatrical elements. Rafi was instrumental in moving South Asian theatre from classic styles toward a more contemporary, modern approach.

He wrote plays, written in Punjabi and Urdu, often challenged societal norms. He wrote about social injustice and the role of women, presenting themes that were often revolutionary for his time and designed to provoke audiences into new realms of thought.

=== Radio ===
He wrote many radio plays and dramas. In 1941, All India Radio broadcast his Punjabi play, Akhiyan, which became a timeless classic. It was a landmark production that showed the emotional and narrative potential of the Punjabi language in drama.

Rafi's radio dramas bridged the gap between traditional storytelling and modern dramatic seriousness. His work was praised for exploring the deep, primordial emotions and mystic experiences of common people, proving that their lives could be the subject of profound drama.

=== Acting ===
Peerzada believed that a truly skilled actor could create and perform a drama without needing a writer or director. In the 1946 film Neecha Nagar, Rafi Peer portrayed the villainous wealthy landlord named Sarkar. The film was a landmark in Indian social realist cinema, portrays the stark class divide between the affluent and the poor. The film received three awards at the 1946 Cannes Film Festival. It became the first Indian film to win an award at the Cannes Film Festival, sharing the Grand Prix award in 1946.

Despite his film work, He was skeptical of the film industry's creative merit, believing it did not provide the fertile ground needed for true dramatic art.

He believed the stage offered actors the creative freedom to fully express themselves because he felt that in cinema the directors dominated and didn't allowed the artists to fully express their thoughts. He was about passion about stagecraft but he also gained acting experience and explored film.

=== Migration to Pakistan ===
After the 1947 partition of India, he moved to Lahore and established the Drama Markaz, a theatre group that fostered Pakistan's emerging radio drama tradition. He advocated for the art of theatre, lecturing at universities and writing on theatrical theory. In Lahore, he became a key figure in establishing and developing Pakistan's modern performing arts scene, particularly in radio and theatre.

In Lahore, he founded a theatre group called Drama Markaz. The group was instrumental in pioneering the tradition of nascent radio drama in Pakistan and played a vital role in shaping the country's early theatre. He wrote and produced numerous dramas for Radio Pakistan in Lahore throughout the 1950s and 1960s.

In 1967, he was honored by the Government of Pakistan with the Pride of Performance for his contributions towards cinema and arts. His productions helped to establish and mature the form of radio drama in the newly-formed nation.

== Personal life ==
He married a German woman and had a daughter. Later he married Ismat Peerzada at the insistence of his mother and the couple had seven children: Salman Peerzada, Tasneem Peerzada, Kausar Peerzada, Usman Peerzada, Imran Peerzada and the twin brothers, Faizan Peerzada and Saadan Peerzada.

== Death ==
He died on April 11, 1974, at Lahore, Pakistan.

== Filmography ==
=== Film ===
| Year | Film | Role | Ref. |
|---|---|---|---|
| 1946 | Neecha Nagar | Sarkar | |

== Awards and recognition ==
| Year | Award | Category | Result | Title | Ref. |
|---|---|---|---|---|---|
| 1967 | Pride of Performance | Award by the President of Pakistan | Won | Arts | |
