= Maula Jatt =

1979 Pakistani film

- Theatrical release poster
- Directed by: Yunus Malik
- Written by: Nasir Adeeb
- Produced by: Sarwar Bhatti
- Starring: Sultan Rahi; Mustafa Qureshi; Aasia; Kaifee; Adeeb; Aliya Begum; Ilyas Kashmiri
- Cinematography: Masud Butt
- Music by: Master Inayat Hussain
- Production company: Bahu Films
- Release date: 1979
- Running time: 145 minutes
- Country: Pakistan
- Language: Punjabi

Maula Jatt (Punjabi: مَولا جٹ), is a 1979 Pakistani Punjabi-language action, musical film directed by Yunus Malik and produced by Sarwar Bhatti.

The film is an unofficial sequel to the 1975 Wehshi Jatt, starring Sultan Rahi as Maula Jatt and Mustafa Qureshi as his arch-rival Noori Natt.

This film belongs to a genre which represents the rural culture of Pakistani central Punjab. Its success set the trend of action films being popular in Pakistan and cemented Sultan Rahi as Lollywood's main hero. The film was inspired by Ahmed Nadeem Qasmi's short story "Gandasa" which described the culture of Gujranwala's rural areas. It received positive reviews from critics. An unofficial sequel titled Maula Jatt in London, also directed by Yunus Malik, was released in 1981.

== Plot ==
The story is set in a village of the town of Mamdal, near Kabirwala. Following the settlement of Maula Jatt's family feud, Maula has renounced violence and is in charge of administering the peace of 25 villages.

A member of the Natt clan, Maakha, chases a girl, who is given protection by Maula's sister-in-law Daani. When Maakha refuses to retreat, Maula's friend Moodha beats up Maakha and leaves a scar on his nose. Maula decrees that if Maakha wants to avoid the fate of being killed by his 'Gandasa', he should marry the girl whom he has dishonoured and marry his sister off to her brother. As the girl has no family, so Maula orders Maakha to marry his sister to Moodha. When Makha returns home, his sister Daaro kills him for cowardice. Daaro then goes to kill Maula, but is arrested on the way for Maakha's murder. However she is bailed out by a man who calls her sister, who is actually Maula.

When Noori Natt gets out of jail, he tells the police that he has run out of competition and he wants a worthy opponent. The police direct him to Malik Haaku, whose clan Maula had slaughtered. Haku doesn't tell Noori the name of his old rival and warns him not to get in his way if he ever finds out about him. On returning home, Daaro tells him of Maakha's defeat and Maula's judgement that she should marry Moodha. Noori comes to Maula's village seeking revenge while Maula is away, and breaks Moodha's leg. When Maula returns, he vows to take Noori's leg in return and recovers his Gandasa. (Note: At the end of Wehshi Jatt he had buried his Gandasa at the grave of his friend Roshna, who had tried to keep him from violence and whose murder resulted in Maula Jatt's killing spree at the end of Wehshi Jatt.)

Maula then rides to find Noori and defeats many of Natt's men. Maula and Noori finally face off but police stop them from killing each other. In the meantime, Noori's brother-in-law Akku Qatil kills many of Maula's villagers in revenge. Finally a judge decrees that both Maula and Noori should be sent back to their villages under house arrest. However, soon both Jatt and Natt are provoked and ride against each other, although by the time they reach each other for a fight both have been shot several times by the police guarding them. In the hospital, Daaro realizes Maula had called her sister.

After Maula and Noori pretend to reconcile, the police lift the blockade from both villages. Immediately, Akku goes to attack Maula's village, but is himself killed. Maula sends Akku's body and other wedding gifts to Daaro, telling them the wedding procession is coming now, and Noori swears revenge on Maula's village.

As the groom's procession sets out for Daaro's village, Noori leads many Natt clansmen to attack the procession. Maula defeats all the Natt men, and then also Noori himself. Just as he is about to deliver the final blow, Daaro, comes to the rescue and requests Maula to spare Noori and considering that Maula had called her his sister. Maula agrees but Noori amputates his own leg so Maula's revenge is completed. The film ends with Daaro agreeing to marry Moodha and their rivalry resolved forever. Maula immediately throws away his Gandasa and makes an impassioned plea to the audience to choose seeking justice over revenge.

== Cast ==
- Sultan Rahi as Maula
- Mustafa Qureshi as Noori
- Aasia as Mukkho Jatti
- Kaifee as Moodha Gaadi
- Chakori as Daaro Nattni
- Adeeb as Maakha Natt
- Aliya Begum
- Asad Bukhari as Akku Natt
- Seema as Daani
- Shakeel as Jailor
- Rangeela
- Albela
- Ilyas Kashmiri as Malik Haku
- Khalid Saleem Mota

== Legacy ==
Film Maula Jatt was commercially successful in the 1980s and celebrated its Diamond Jubilee at the cinemas and the box office. Over the years, the film has been able to attain cult status.

=== Adaptation ===
In December 2013, Bilal Lashari, the director of Waar (2013), announced that he would direct a new version of Maula Jatt. Lashari described the project as a multi-million-dollar attempt to revisit the Punjabi gandasa film tradition and pay homage to the 1979 film. The producers later described The Legend of Maula Jatt as neither a remake nor a sequel, but an adaptation based on the characters from Maula Jatt.

The film's release was delayed by a copyright dispute with Muhammad Sarwar Bhatti, the producer of the 1979 film, and later by the COVID-19 pandemic. A settlement was reached in February 2020, under which Bhatti was recognised as the copyright and trademark owner of the original film and allowed the new film's production, release, promotion and distribution to proceed. The Legend of Maula Jatt was released in 2022 and became the highest-grossing Pakistani film and the highest-grossing Punjabi-language film worldwide.

== Banning of the film by the government ==
It is said that this film was banned because of violence, but later this ban was lifted.

== Soundtracks ==
The songs were composed by Master Inayat Hussain. These were sung by singers: Noor Jehan, Mehnaz, Inayat Hussain Bhatti, Alam Lohar, Shaukat Ali and Ghulam Ali.

The soundtrack consisted of the following songs:

- Nashe diye botlay, na aini att chukk ni... Inayat Hussain Bhatti
- Jhanjhar kare teinu pyar we, main mar gayi Mehnaz
- Rowe maan te gharoor, ajj hasse majboor Noor Jehan
- Dildar mere pyar kolun bach ke te kithe Noor Jehan
- A te wela aap dasse ga, kon maarda ae maidan pehle halle Alam Lohar, Shaukat Ali and others (a Punjabi bhangra song)
