= Toote Khilone =

- Directed by: Ketan Anand
- Starring: Shekhar Kapur; Shabana Azmi; Utpal Dutt
- Music by: Bappi Lahiri
- Release date: 1978
- Country: India
- Language: Hindi

Toote Khilone (transl. Broken Toys) is a 1978 Indian Hindi-language film produced by Prem Sawhney and Mahendra Shah. The film is directed by Ketan Anand. The film stars Ketan's cousin Shekhar Kapur, Shabana Azmi and Utpal Dutt. The film's music is by Bappi Lahiri. The song "Maana Ho Tum" written by Kaifi Azmi and sung by Yesudas is the highlight of this film.

== Songs ==
The film's soundtrack was composed by Bappi Lahiri to the lyrics written by Kaifi Azmi:

- "Nanha Sa Panchhi Re Tu" (part 1) – Kishore Kumar
- "Nanha Sa Panchhi Re Tu" (part 2) – Kishore Kumar
- "Bandhan Kat Gaye" – Bappi Lahiri
- "Doob Raha Hai Mera Dil" – Lata Mangeshkar
- "Kya Jane Yeh Duniya" – Amit Kumar, Sulakshana Pandit
- "Mana Ho Tum Behad Haseen" – K. J. Yesudas
- "Mana Ho Tum" (sad) – K. J. Yesudas

== Reception ==
Ranjan Das Gupta of The Hindu has praised the lyrics.
