= Uma Anand =

Indian journalist and actress

Uma
- Born: 1923; Lahore, British India
- Died: 13 November 2009 (aged 85–86)
- Occupations: Journalist, Actress, Broadcaster
- Spouse: Chetan Anand (m. 1943; died 1997)
- Children: 2; Ketan Anand and Vivek Anand
- Family: Anand family

Uma Anand (1923 – 13 November 2009) was an Indian journalist, actress, and a broadcaster in the mid-1900s.

== Life ==
She was born in 1923 in Lahore, Punjab, British India to a Bengali Christian family. One of her sisters, Indu Mitha, is a Bharatanatyam exponent based in Pakistan.

Uma was the wife of the Bollywood film director Chetan Anand (married in 1943) and mother of Ketan Anand and Vivek Anand. She worked as an actress in Neecha Nagar (1946). She also wrote Taxi Driver with her husband Chetan and her brother-in-law Vijay Anand, that starred her mother's cousin Kalpana Kartik and her brother-in-law Dev Anand. After estrangement from her husband, she became a companion of Ebrahim Alkazi.

From 1965 to 1981, Anand was an editor of Sangeet Natak, a journal published by the Sangeet Natak Akademi. She also wrote many children books that were translated and published in different Indian languages by the National Book Trust of India. Her last book, Chetan Anand: The Poetics of Film, was co-authored with her eldest son Ketan Anand, and it portrayed life in the theatre and cinema in Mumbai, India in the early 1940s and 1950s.

She died on 13 November 2009.

== Filmography ==
- Neecha Nagar (1946)
- Taxi Driver (1954)
