= Jaan Hazir Hai =

- जान हाज़िर है
- Directed by: Manohar Nath Rangroo
- Produced by: Vijay Anand
- Starring: Prem Kishan, Shekhar Kapoor, Natasha (real name Bilkis Noori), Urmila Bhatt, Iftikhar, Murad, Tirlok Kapoor, Ranjan, Jankidas
- Music by: Jaikumar Parte Lyrics: Shaily Shailendra
- Release date: 1975
- Country: India
- Language: Hindi

Jaan Hazir Hai is a 1975 Bollywood film directed by Manohar Nath Rangroo. This film produced by Vijay Anand. Prem Kishan, Shekhar Kapoor, Natasha (real name Bilkis Noori), Urmila Bhatt, Iftikhar, Murad, Trilok Kapoor, Ranjan, Jankidas and Komila Virk were a team of film cast. Film released on 1 January 1975.This was the first film of main lead. Music for the film was given by Jai Kumar Parte.

== Cast ==
- Urmila Bhatt
- Iftekhar
- Jankidas
- Trilok Kapoor
- Shekhar Kapur
- Prem Krishen
- Murad
- Natasha
- Ranjan
- Mohan Sherry
- Komilla Wirk

== Soundtrack ==
There were 5 songs in the movie :

1- Arre meri chhammak chhallo (Amit Kumar, Usha Timothy)

2- Sawan Aya badal aaye (Dilraj Kaur)

3- Bhaande phoot jayenge (Amit Kumar, Manhar)

4- Ye shehri mor dekho (Dilraj Kaur, Amit Kumar)

5- Hum na rahenge (Amit Kumar, Manhar, Dilraj Kaur)

All songs were written by the son of popular lyricist Shailendra with the pen name Shaily Shailendra.
