= Mushtaque Changezi =

Pakistani actor (1943–2012)

- مشتاق چنگيزي
- Born: Mushtaque Malano; 1943; Kotri, Jamshoro district, Sindh, Pakistan
- Died: March 1, 2012 (aged 68–69); Kotri, Sindh, Pakistan
- Other name: Dileep Kumar of Sindhi Films
- Occupations: Actor, producer, writer
- Years active: 1960 – 1990
- Spouse: Chakori
- Honours: Pride of Performance by the President of Pakistan

Mushtaque Changezi ,(Sindhi: مشتاق چنگيزي )(1943 - March 2012) was a Pakistani actor, director and writer of Sindhi film industry. He was nicknamed as Dileep Kumar of Sindhi films.

== Early life ==
Mushtaque Changezi was born in 1943 in Kotri in Jamshoro district of Sindh province of Pakistan. His real name was Mushtaque Malano. His father, Muhammad Yaqoob Malano, served as a police officer. Mushtaque initially pursued a career as a photographer at Sindh Agriculture College (now known as Sindh Agriculture University) in Tando Jam.

== Career ==
He began his acting career as a comedian in stage dramas. He was also a radio artist. In 1960, he auditioned for a comedic role in the film Shehru Feroz. During the audition, the film's director, Hassan Shaikh, was greatly impressed by Mushtaque's photogenic looks and talent, leading him to cast Mushtaque as the film's hero instead. This marked a turning point in his career, propelling him to stardom.

Following the success of "Shehru Feroz," Mushtaque went on to play leading roles in approximately 60 Sindhi language films. His pairing with actress Chakori became immensely popular. Some of his notable films include "Mithra Shal Milan," "Laila Majnu," "Chandoki," "Nuri Jam Tamachi," "Piyar Tan Sadquau," "Piyar Kayo Seengar," and "Sodha Puta Sindh Ja." His last film was "Miran Jamali" in 1990.

In addition to acting, Changezi also ventured into writing and directing films.

As the Sindhi film industry declined, he transitioned to television dramas. Despite being a prominent hero, he was offered a supporting role as a lawyer in Imdad Shah Rashdi's Sindhi drama "Aukha Pandh." He also played minor roles in other television plays.

In the final years before his death, he returned to Radio Pakistan, hosting an entertainment program. He produced plays for radio based on the seven Surs of Shah Abdul Latif Bhitai and also participated in a radio program called "Katchehri."

Mushtaque's autobiography, titled "Maan Ker Aahiyan" (Who Am I?), was published by Naz Sanai.

== Filmography ==
- Shehro Feroz (1968)
- Chandoki (1969)
- Laila Majnu (1971)
- Mahboob Mitha (1971)
- Mithra Shaala Milan (1972)
- Albeli (1973)
- Jeejal Mau (1973)
- Sodha Puta Sindh Ja (1973)
- Muhinjo Piyar Pukaray (1974)
- Piyara Kayo Seengar (1974)
- Piyar Tan Sadquay (1974)
- Ach Ta Bhakir Payoon (1976)
- Rut Aaen Ajrak (1977)
- Rata Ji Rand (1976)
- Mumta (1984)
- Jalal Chandio (1985)
- Paru Chandio (1987)
- Bewas (1989)
- Shaheed (1989)
- Meeran Jamali (1990)

== Death ==
Mushtaque Changezi died on March 1, 2012, in Hyderabad. His mortal remains were laid to rest in Tando Jahanian graveyard, Hyderabad.
