= Ekta (film) =

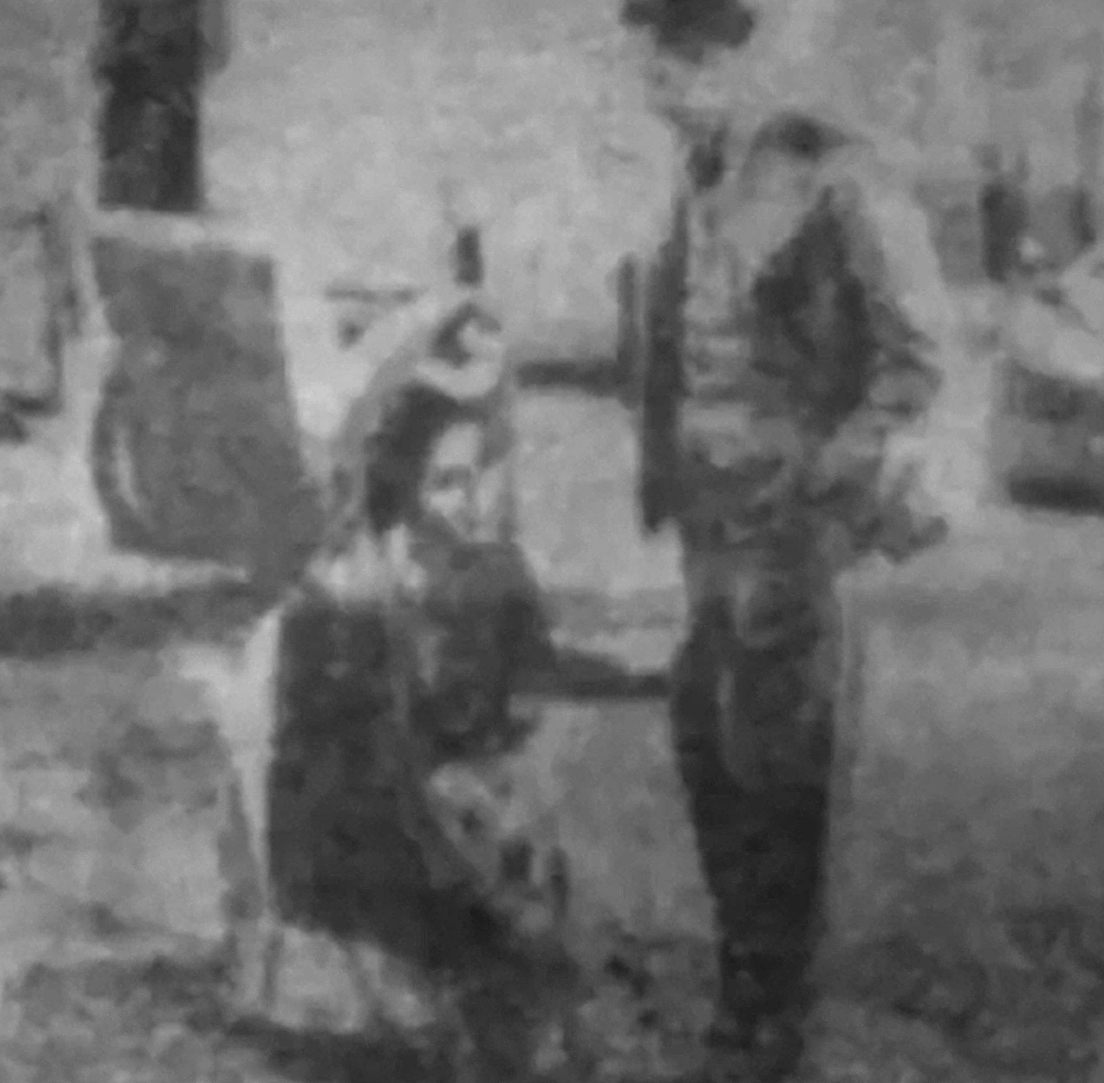
- Directed by: Jamshed Boman Homi Wadia
- Written by: Agha Ghulam Nabi, Khialdaas Fani
- Produced by: Karim Bux Nizamani
- Starring: Karim Bux Nizamani; Kaushalya; Maya Devi; Gulshan Sufi; Chandu Shivdasani; Sikandar; Chander Vasvani; Hari Shivdasani
- Music by: Gulshan Sufi, Ram Panjwani
- Production company: Wadia Studios
- Release date: 1942
- Country: British India
- Language: Sindh

Ekta is a 1942 Sindhi film produced by Karim Bux Nizamani and directed by Homi Wadia in Bombay (now Mumbai) at Wadia Studios. This black and white film holds the distinction of being the first Sindhi film and was entirely financed by Karim Bux Nizamani. The movie starred Nizamani and Kaushalya in the lead roles, with a central theme revolving around Hindu-Muslim unity.

Its premier at the Taj Mahal Cinema in Karachi was inaugurated by the then Premier of Sindh, Allah Bux Soomro, as it was the first ever film in Sindhi language. According to Nizamani it became a great success and the government had to call the police to control the outburst of fans. After a few weeks the Taj Mahal Cinema had to stop displaying the film. Nizamani writes in his famous autobiography 'Kaee Kitab'–Page 194:

"After paying tribute to Jamshed Wadia, the unit head of the film, the inauguration was done. After that he returned to his special seat and sat down. The film then began. Since this was the first film made in the Sindhi language, there was an immense, endless, uncontrollable crowd of fans outside the cinema, all trying to get tickets. In their attempt to obtain tickets, the crowd pushed so forcefully that they reached all the way to the ticket windows inside, breaking the security arrangements. Because of this rush, the crowd broke the cinema’s windows, doors, glass panes, and barriers. The police, with great difficulty, managed to control this vast and uncontrollable crowd.

This heavy rush continued outside the cinema for many weeks. Finally, the cinema owners forcibly stopped showing the film. Had the cinema owners wanted, the film could have continued running for many more weeks."

== Production ==
This film was directed by Jamshed Boman Homi Wadia, produced and financed by Karim Bux Nizamani, who also played the lead role in the film. Nizamani was not only a film actor but also a writer, social worker, and a landlord in Matli, Sindh. His autobiography "Kayee" is considered one of the best autobiographies in Sindhi literature. The film's heroine, Kaushalya hailed from Uttar Pradesh, India, and was a talented dancer, playback singer, and actress. Her father, Lachhu Maharaj, was a famous dancer himself and trained Kaushalya in Kathak dance. Her mother's name was Rama Devi.

In addition to Nizamani and Kaushalya, the film featured Hari Shivdasani, Chandu Shivdasani, Sikander, Gulshan Sufi, Chander Vaswani, Maya Devi, and others in their respective roles. The story and dialogues were penned by the noted writer Agha Abdul Nabi Sufi, while the famous poet Khialdas Fani composed the film's lyrics. The central theme of the movie was Hindu-Muslim harmony, as the title "Ekta" signifies unity. The film was released at Taj Mahal Cinema in Karachi. Kaushalya and Gulshan Sufi lent their melodious voices as playback singers for this film.

== See also ==
- Sindhi cinema
- List of Sindhi-language films
