= Shehro Feroz =

Shero Feroz
- Directed by: Shaikh Hassan
- Produced by: Khadim Films
- Starring: Meh Parah, Mushtaque Changezi
- Music by: Ghulam Ali
- Release date: 18 October 1968
- Country: Pakistan
- Language: Sindhi
- Box office: Rs. 0.002 crore (US$72)

Shero Feroz (Sindhi: شهرو فيروز) is a Pakistani film released on 18 October 1968. Produced by Khadim Films (a film production company founded by the brothers Ali Baloch and Khadim Hussain Baloch), it was directed by Shaikh Hassan and launched the career of two famous Sindhi actors, Meh Parah and Mushtaq Changezi.

== See also ==
- Sindhi cinema
- List of Sindhi-language films
