= Ghoonghat Lah Kunwar =

Sindhi language film

- Directed by: Ghulam Hyder Siddiqui
- Screenplay by: Bashier Ahmed
- Produced by: Saleh Muhammad Bhatti
- Starring: Saeeda; Waseem
- Music by: Imdad Hussain
- Release date: 18 September 1970
- Country: Pakistan
- Language: Sindhi

Ghooghat Lah Kunwar (Sindhi: گهونگهٽ لاھ ڪنوار) is a Sindhi language film which was released on 18 September 1970 from Karachi. Saeeda and Waseem played leading roles in this film. Famous singer Noor Jahan and Mahedi Hassan were playback singers among others. The story is said to be written by Bashier Ahmed.

== Details ==
This Sindhi film was released on 18 September 1970 from Karachi, Sindh, Pakistan. The film was produced by Saleh Muhammad Bhatti and directed by Ghulam Hyder Siddiqui. The music director of this film was Imdad Hussain (1930 - 21 February 2000) and lyrics were written by Syed Manzoor Naqvi. The dialogues of this film were written by the renowned writer Amar Jaleel. This was the first partially coloured Sindhi Pakistani movie.

== Playback Singers ==
The film gained popularity primarily due to its captivating lyrics. Renowned Pakistani singer Noor Jahan and the King of Ghazals, Mehdi Hassan, recorded the songs for this film. Other notable playback singers included Runa Laila, Muhammad Yousuf, and Irene Parveen.

This film marked actor Waseem's debut as a hero, with Saeeda as the leading actress. The cast also included Chakori, Hanif, Malik Anokho, Abdul Haque Abro, Khanum, Beena, and Qamar.
