= Perdesi =

- Directed by: S. A. Ghaffar
- Written by: Syed Hussain Ali Shah Fazlani
- Produced by: Syed Hussain Ali Shah Fazlani, Fazlani Films
- Starring: Noor Muhammad Charlie; Shamsuddin Soomro; Mustafa Qureshi; Lali; Salomi; Rumi
- Cinematography: Suhail Hashmi
- Music by: Ghulam Nabi Abdul Lateef
- Release date: 21 April 1960
- Country: Pakistan
- Language: Sindhi

Perdesi is a 1960 Sindhi film directed by S. A. Ghaffar.

== Cast ==
- Noor Mohammad Charlie
- Fazlani
- Shamsuddin Soomro
- Mustafa Qureshi
- Lali
- Salomi
- Rumi
