= Faizan Peerzada =

Pakistani artist and puppeteer (1958–2012)

- Born: Syed Faizan Peerzada; 1958; Lahore, Punjab
- Died: 21 December 2012 (aged 53–54); Lahore, Punjab
- Occupations: Artist, puppeteer, theatre director
- Father: Rafi Peer
- Relatives: Usman Peerzada (brother)
- Awards: Tamgha-i-Imtiaz (Medal of Excellence) for puppetry from the Government of Pakistan in 2004

Faizan Peerzada (Urdu: فیضان پیرزادہ) (born 1958 Lahore – died 21 December 2012, Lahore) was a Pakistani artist, puppeteer and theater director.

== Career ==
Peerzada began painting and crafting puppets as a young adult and his lifelong passion for the arts colored the course of his entire life. His mark in the artistic world remains as a puppeteer, a painter and a patron of the arts. Peerzada also received the Tamgha-i-Imtiaz, the Presidential Award, for puppetry in 2004.

=== Life of Faizan Peerzada ===
Faizan Peerzada was born, with a twin brother Sadaan, in Lahore, Pakistan in 1958. He was one of the sons of Pakistan's leading theatre playwright Rafi Peer along with his brothers Salman Peerzada and Usman Peerzada. Faizan finished his basic schooling at St. Anthony High School, Lahore, Pakistan and then attended the National College of Arts, Lahore without finishing his education there.

Faizan started his career at Rafi Peer Theatre Workshop in 1977. He held his first painting exhibition at the American Cultural Centre, Karachi in 1977

Faizan held approximately 40 painting exhibitions in Pakistan, and 26 solo art exhibitions in the United States and Europe.

Faizan began his career at Rafi Peer Theatre Workshop, and later became the artistic director there in 1979.

He especially designed programmes to celebrate the 'International Year of the Child' spread over the entire year, designed three major art festivals in which at least 35,000 children participated in a span of six months in 1980.

Faizan's fascination for lights began (He designed stages and lights for several Pakistani and International events) for 'Rafi Peer Theatre Workshop' in 1992.

'Rafi Peer Theatre Workshop' develops plays mainly for youth and child audiences and holds collaborative project events with international groups. It later founded the 'Museum of Puppetry' in Lahore, Pakistan in 2004.

He was appointed the president of UNIMA (world-wide puppetry organisation) in Pakistan.

Faizaan and his other family members produced Sim Sim Hamara (Our Sim Sim), a Pakistani version of Sesame Street in 2011.

== Death ==
Faizan Peerzada died of a heart attack at the age of 54 on 21 December 2012, in Lahore, Pakistan.

== Awards and recognition ==
- Tamgha-i-Imtiaz (Medal of Excellence) Award for puppetry by the Government of Pakistan in 2004.
