= Sheila Ramani =

Indian actress (1932–2015

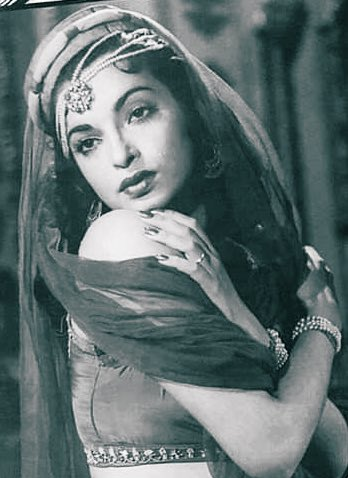
- Born: Sheila Ramani; 2 March 1932; Karachi, Sindh, British India
- Died: 15 July 2015 (aged 83); Mhow, Indore, Madhya Pradesh, India
- Occupation: Actress
- Years active: 1952–1967
- Works: Taxi driver Funtoosh
- Spouse: Jal Cowasji (m. 1963)
- Children: Rahul Cowasji (son); Zal Cowasji (son)
- Father: Kewal Ramani

Sheila Ramani (2 March 1932 – 15 July 2015) was an Indian actress who was introduced into Bollywood by the film-maker Chetan Anand. She is known for her role in the movie Taxi Driver. She was born in Sindh and was one of the few actresses from Sindh to join the Indian film industry.

== Life and career ==
Ramani was crowned Miss Shimla in the early 1950s. She was mostly seen as an upper-class mod girl in the roles she portrayed in many movies. She played the lead in a Pakistani film. Ramani went back to India and starred in further movies in Mumbai. In the later part of her career, she was reduced to obscure films.

Later on in her life Ramani married and moved to the United States. She lived her last years in Mhow, a small cantonment town in the Indore district of Madhya Pradesh. She died on 15 July 2015. Ramani's husband Jal Cowasji, a noted industrialist, died about three decades ago. She was survived by her two sons Rahul and Zal.

== Filmography ==
Year	Film	Role	Notes
1952	Anand Math	Court singer-dancer (unnamed)	Debut film and role; dubbed in Tamil and re-released as Ananda Madam (1953)
1952	Badnam		
1953	Surang	Rani	
1953	Teen Batti Char Raasta	Kamala	
1954	Kalakar		
1954	Mangu		
1954	Meenaar	Sheila	
1954	Naukri	Seema	
1954	Taxi Driver	Sylvie	
1955	Ghamand		
1955	Joru Ka Bhai		
1955	Railway Platform	Indira	
1955	Shahzada		
1956	Anokhi		Pakistani film
1956	Awara Shahzadi		
1956	Funtoosh	Neilu	
1956	Gulam Begum Badshah		
1956	Guru Ghantal		
1956	Sultana Daku		
1957	Anjali	Madhavi	Abridged version of Arpan (1957)
1957	Arpan	Madhavi	
1957	Mumtaz Mahal		
1958	Abana		First Indian Sindhi language film; she became the first leading actress of Sindhi Cinema.
1959	Bhagwan Aur Shaitan		
1959	Jungle King		
1960	Return of Mr. Superman	Usha	
1962	Maa Beta	Muniya	
1967	Awara Ladki		Last release
