= Shekhar Kapur =

Indian filmmaker (born 1945)

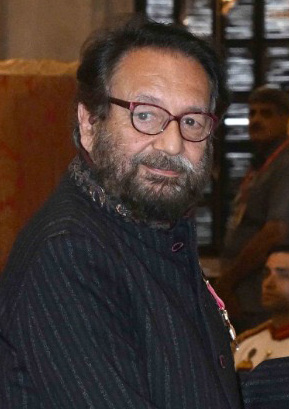
- Kapur in 2025
- Born: Shekhar Kulbhushan Kapur; 6 December 1945 (age 80); Lahore, Punjab, British India
- Occupation: Filmmaker
- Years active: 1974–present
- Works: Full list
- Spouses: Medha Gujral (m. 1984; div. 1994); Suchitra Krishnamoorthi (m. 1999; div. 2007)
- Children: 1
- Relatives: Sohaila Kapur (sister); Dev Anand (uncle); Chetan Anand (uncle); Vijay Anand (uncle); Purab Kohli (nephew)
- Family: Anand-Sahni family
- Honours: Padma Bhushan (2025); Padma Shri (2000)

Chairman of Film and Television Institute of India
- In office 30 September 2020 – 1 September 2023
- Preceded by: B. P. Singh
- Succeeded by: R. Madhavan

Shekhar Kulbhushan Kapur (born 6 December 1945) is an Indian filmmaker. Born into the Anand-Sahni family, Kapur is the recipient of several accolades, including a BAFTA Award, a National Film Award, a National Board of Review Award and three Filmfare Awards, in addition to nomination for a Golden Globe Award.

Kapur became known in Bollywood with his recurring role in the television series Khandaan. He then made his directorial debut with cult classic Masoom in 1983, before gaining widespread acclaim with Mr. India in 1987. He then gained international recognition and acclaim in 1994 with biographical film Bandit Queen, based on the infamous Indian bandit and politician Phoolan Devi. The film premiered in the directors' fortnight section of the 1994 Cannes Film Festival and was screened at the Edinburgh Film Festival.

Kapur achieved further international prominence with the 1998 period film Elizabeth, a fictionalized account of the reign of English Queen Elizabeth I, which was nominated for seven Academy Awards. He then directed war drama film The Four Feathers (2002). In 2007, he directed Elizabeth: The Golden Age, the sequel to his 1998 film.

Shekhar Kapur was awarded the Padma Bhushan, India's third highest civilian award, in 2025.

== Early life and education ==
Shekhar was born on 6 December 1945 in Lahore, Punjab, British India, in a Punjabi Hindu family to Kulbhushan Kapoor, a doctor with a flourishing practice, and his wife Sheel Kanta Kapoor.

Whilst travelling on a train from the newly created Pakistan to India, a massacre took place; Kapur's mother Sheel played dead and hid both him and his sister under her body. Reflecting on this, Kapur stated that the partition of India happened through "the blood of one people".

The nephew of famous Indian actor Dev Anand (Kapur's mother Sheel Kanta was the sister of actors Chetan, Dev and Vijay Anand), he was discouraged from getting into films by his father. Kapur is the only son of his parents and he has three sisters. One of his sisters, Neelu, was the first wife of actor Navin Nischol, while another sister, Aruna, is the wife of actor Parikshit Sahni. His third and youngest sister is Sohaila Kapur.

Kapur attended Modern School of New Delhi. He studied economics at St. Stephen's College. At 22, he became a Chartered Accountant with the ICAEW in England, having studied accountancy at the behest of his parents. He then started his career working with a multinational oil company. He moved to the United Kingdom in 1970, and spent several years working as an accountant and management consultant.

== Filmmaking career ==
=== In India ===
He turned director with the family drama Masoom (1983), starring Naseeruddin Shah, Shabana Azmi and a young Jugal Hansraj and Urmila Matondkar. The plot followed the story of an illegitimate boy who struggles to find acceptance from his stepmother. He then directed the 1987 science-fiction film Mr. India, starring Anil Kapoor, Sridevi and Amrish Puri in his most famous role as the villain Mogambo. Puri's most famous dialogue in this film "Mogambo Khush Hua" is still remembered. In 1994 he directed the critically acclaimed Bandit Queen and played a cameo in the film as a truck driver.

Kapur was infamous for abandoning several films in which he was originally the director. He was originally the director of the 1989 film Joshilaay, which starred Sunny Deol, Anil Kapoor, Sridevi and Meenakshi Sheshadri before leaving the production halfway, and its producer Sibti Hassan Rizvi stepped in to complete the film. In 1992, he had shot some scenes for Barsaat, which was originally titled Champion and was going to be the debut film of Bobby Deol, but he left the production and was replaced by Rajkumar Santoshi. In 1995, he partly directed Dushmani, starring Sunny Deol, Jackie Shroff and Manisha Koirala before its producer Bunty Soorma stepped in to complete the film.

Kapur was the executive producer of the film The Guru. He established an Indian film company with Ram Gopal Verma and Mani Ratnam, though the group has thus far produced only one film, Dil Se.. (1998), starring Shahrukh Khan and Manisha Koirala. Kapur executive-produced the Bollywood-themed musical Bombay Dreams by Andrew Lloyd Webber, which ran in London's the West End and on Broadway in New York City for 1 year.

In 2016, Kapur delivers an autobiographical film and documentary about Amma, well known as Mata Amritanandamayi Devi, called "The Science of Compassion".

=== International ===
In 1998, he received international recognition for the second time after Bandit Queen, when he directed the Academy Award-winning period film Elizabeth, a fictional account of the reign of British Queen Elizabeth I nominated for seven Oscars. The 2007 sequel, Elizabeth: The Golden Age, was nominated for two Oscars. He was accused of being anti-British by British tabloids for his inaccurate portrayal of the British Army in the 2002 movie The Four Feathers. He denied the accusations and stated that he was merely "anti-colonisation".

== Other ventures ==
Kapur started his career as an actor in the movie Jaan Hazir Hai (1975) starring Prem Kishen and Trilok Kapoor and later in Toote Khilone, in Bollywood. He appeared in several Hindi television dramas, such as Udaan (Doordarshan), opposite Kavita Chaudhary, Upanyaas (Doordarshan) opposite Nisha Singh, and Masoom opposite Neena Gupta.

He served as judge on the reality TV series India's Got Talent, aired on Colors.

In an unusual role for him, Kapur provided the voice of Mohandas Gandhi in the Charkha Audiobooks title of The Story of My Experiments with Truth, alongside Nandita Das as narrator.

In 2013, Kapur hosted the TV show Pradhanmantri on ABP News. On the show, which aims to bring never-seen-before facets of Indian history, he was the narrator.

=== Comic book publishing ===
In 2006, Kapur formed Liquid Comics and Virgin Animation, an entertainment company focused on creating new stories and characters for a global audience. The Shakti titles of Kapur and Deepak Chopra's company debuted with Devi and The Sadhu. Devi is about "a fierce feminine warrior, stronger than the Gods themselves ... a champion of the heavens, and the protector of man", while The Sadhu "is about one man's choice between his spiritual oath and his human instinct."

== Personal life ==
Kapur had a relationship for seven years with actress Shabana Azmi. He first was married to Medha Gujral, niece of former Indian Prime Minister Inder Kumar Gujral. They divorced in 1994. She died on 25 November 2014 at a hospital in New York City of liver failure following a second heart and first kidney transplant. Kapur later married actress Suchitra Krishnamoorthi in 1999. They have a daughter named Kaveri Kapur. The couple divorced in 2007.

In March 2020, Krishnamoorthi filed a case against Kapur over a property dispute concerning their daughter Kaveri. She claimed that the property rightfully belongs to their daughter, but has been rented to actor Kabir Bedi and his wife Parveen.

== Filmography ==
Directed features
Year	Title	Distributor
1983	Masoom	Bombino Video
1987	Mr. India	Sujata Films
1994	Bandit Queen	Kaleidoscope Entertainment/Content Flow Studios
1998	Elizabeth	PolyGram Filmed Entertainment
2002	The Four Feathers	Paramount Pictures / Buena Vista International
2007	Elizabeth: The Golden Age	Universal Pictures
2022	What's Love Got to Do with It?	StudioCanal UK

== Awards and honours ==
In 2000, he received Padma Shri, the fourth highest civilian award in India. In 2010, he served as one of the Jury Members in international competition at the 63rd Cannes Film Festival. In 2020, Kapur became the president of the Film and Television Institute of India.

In 2023, Kapur served as the chairperson of the International competition Jury at the 54th International Film Festival of India held from 20 November to 28 November.

Award	Year	Category	Nominated work	Result	Ref(s)
BAFTA Awards	1999	Best Direction	Elizabeth	Nominated	
BAFTA Awards	1999	Outstanding British Film	Elizabeth	Won	
David di Donatello Awards	2008	Best European Film	Elizabeth: The Golden Age	Nominated	
Filmfare Awards	1984	Best Film - Critics	Masoom	Won	
Filmfare Awards	1984	Best Director	Masoom	Nominated	
Filmfare Awards	1995	Best Film - Critics	Bandit Queen	Won	
Filmfare Awards	1997	Best Director	Bandit Queen	Won	
Filmfare Awards	1999	Special Award	—N/a	Won	
Golden Globe Awards	1999	Best Director – Motion Picture	Elizabeth	Nominated	
Italian National Syndicate of Film Journalists	2008	Best European Director	Elizabeth: The Golden Age	Nominated	
National Board of Review Awards	1998	Best Director	Elizabeth	Won	
National Film Awards	1996	Best Feature Film - Hindi	Bandit Queen	Won	
Valladolid International Film Festival	1994	Best Film	Bandit Queen	Nominated	
