= List of Virgin Comics publications =

Virgin Comics is a comic book publisher.

Virgin divide their output into a number of different lines which focus on topics derived from Indian mythology (Shakti), work with film directors (Director's Cut) and with other notable individuals (Virgin Voices).

== Lines ==
=== Director's Cut ===
- Dock Walloper (Edward Burns project)
- Guy Ritchie's Gamekeeper (Guy Ritchie project)
- The Megas (Jonathan Mostow project)
- Seven Brothers (John Woo project)
- Snake Woman (Shekhar Kapur project)

=== Shakti ===
- Devi
- The Sadhu
- Ramayan 3392 A.D.
- India Authentic
- The Tall Tales of Vishnu Sharma
- The Asura Analogues
- The Master Blaster
- Project Kalki
- Beyond
- Blade of the Warrior: Kshatriya
- Buddha
- Priyanka Chopra comic
- Mumbai Macguffin
- Jimmy Zhingchak - Agent of D.I.S.C.O.

=== Virgin Voices ===
- Walk-In (David A. Stewart project)
- Voodoo Child (Nicolas Cage project)
- The Stranded (joint venture with the Sci Fi Channel)
- Masked Magician (based on the character from Breaking the Magician's Code)
- Shadow Hunter (Jenna Jameson project)
- Zombie Broadway (David A. Stewart project)
- Nowhere Man (Hugh Jackman project)

=== Other ===
- Dan Dare
