= Gotham Entertainment Group =

American comic book publisher and distributor

- Founder: Sharad Devarajan (CEO)
- Key people: Sharad Devarajan; Suresh Seetharaman; Christopher Linen; Raju Puthukarai; Peter Feldman; Jeevan Kang; Nagavito Chophy

Gotham Entertainment Group LLC was an American company established in 1997 to establish a leadership position in the Indian comic magazine and children's book market. The company was established by executives in the industry including the former CEO of Time-Life, the former Presidents of Warner Music Media and Bertelsmann Music Group (BMG) Direct, and the former Regional Creative Director of J. Walter Thompson-Asia Pacific. Gotham's CEO, Sharad Devarajan, is an entrepreneur with prior media experience at MTV Networks, Ford Modeling Agency, Elektra Entertainment, and DC Comics.

== History ==
The special Indian version of Spider-Man

Gotham comics started publishing comics in India in the year 1998. In the early to mid-2000s, Gotham established itself as one of the leading providers of international comic magazines in India, securing publishing relationships with DC Comics, Marvel Comics, Dark Horse Comics, MAD Magazine, Panini, S.p.A. and Warner Bros. Worldwide Publishing. Through these arrangements, Gotham had access to a large library of publishing content, featuring over 10,000 character properties and more than 700 monthly comic magazine titles including Superman, Batman, Spider-Man, Hulk, X-Men, Tarzan, Scooby-Doo, The Powerpuff Girls, The Flintstones, and Wonder Woman. Gotham's products were available in English, Hindi, Assamese, Bengali, Tamil, Malayalam, and other regional languages, reaching readers in South Asia.

Perhaps their most significant partnership was with Marvel Comics to create an Indian version of Spider-Man, which incorporated India's ancient, mystical heritage and coincided with the launch of the second Spider-Man film in India.

In July 2008, Gotham announced a partnership with Richard Branson's Virgin empire to launch Virgin Comics in India. The first three titles that were made available in India were: Devi, Snake Woman and The Sadhu followed by Ramayan 3392 A.D., a futuristic sci-fi story inspired by the original Ramayana mythology.

== Staff ==
- Sharad Devarajan - President, CEO, Director
- Suresh Seetharaman - Chief Operating Officer, director
- Christopher Linen - Chairman
- Raju Puthukarai - Vice-chairman
- Peter Feldman - Vice-chairman
- Jeevan J. Kang - Studio chief
- Nagavito Chophy - Asst. studio co-ordinator & digital artist

== Format ==
Gotham Comics was usually published in three varying formats: standard issues (usually 22 pages in length); double issues (48 pages in length, sometimes a combination of two separate stories); and giant specials (six standard issues in one volume).

== See also ==
- Indian comics
- Spider-Man: India
- Virgin Comics
- Raj Comics
- Indrajal Comics
- Amar Chitra Katha
- India Book House
- Level10 Comics
