= The Silent Ones =

Cover art for Sadhu #03 Art by Jeevan Kang

The Silent Ones is a miniseries from Virgin Comics featuring the character of James Jensen from the series Sadhu created by Gotham Chopra. It is written by Saurav Mohapatra and edited by Ron Marz

== Story ==
The Silent Ones continues from the end of the issue #8 of the Sadhu series and is about James searching for his son, Jack, who is the captive of an evil cult.

James comes face to face with the many faces of mysticism in the evil Grand Mistress of the Silent Ones and Trishanku, a sadhu driven to insanity who becomes his ally.

== Availability ==
The miniseries (5 issues) was collected into a Trade Paperback titled Sadhu vol 2: The Silent Ones. In August 2010, Liquid Comics (the successor of Virgin Comics) released all 5 issues for free online on scribd.

== See also ==
- The Sadhu (comics)
- Virgin Comics
- Indian comics
