= Rakshasa in fiction =

Use of Rakshasas in creative works

The term Rakshasa, originally referring to a demon in Dharmic religions, has been used in western and Japanese literature and popular culture. The following are some examples:

== Books and comics ==
- Roger Zelazny's novel Lord of Light, the Rakasha are a type of extraterrestrial beings consisting of "stable fields of energy". They were present before the arrival of humans on the planet of the novel, and are apparently native to it.
- In the novel "The Man-Eater of Malgudi," by Indian writer R.K. Narayan, the anxieties of the protagonist, Nataraj, about a relentlessly violent hunter who has come to town are eased when his employee reminds him that rakshasas always contain the seeds of their own destruction. He tells Nataraj of a rakshasa who scorched the earth with the flames at the ends of his arms but in the end killed himself when he was tricked into touching his hands to his own forehead. The moral of inevitable self-destruction of the "monster-demons" is central to the book's plot and theme, as it allows Nataraj to maintain his pacifism and fatalism even in the face of the antagonist's worst provocations.
- In Journey to the West, a famous Chinese novel, one of the antagonists is named 'Lady Raksha'
- In the manga Berserk, There is a character called Rakshas, who is one of Griffith's apostle lieutenants in the new Band of the Hawk. His body is composed of an amorphous cloak, with his head (and possibly other body parts) hidden inside. He also wears a three eyed mask.
- In the manga Fist of the North Star, the character Shachi is referred to as "Rakshasa, the Asura-devouring beast".
- In the fantasy novel Song in the Silence, by Elizabeth Kerner, the demons are referred to as rakshasa by their dragon enemies.
- In the Children of the Lamp novels by P.B. Kerr, the elder djinn of the Marid tribe is named Mr. Rakshasas.
- In the Gold Digger comic series, the character Genn is a member of the Rakshasa race, which is a genderless race of shapeshifters who feed on the ethereal energy of other beings for sustenance.
- In F. Paul Wilson's novel The Tomb, hero Repairman Jack confronts a Bhagavad Gita-studying foe who commands a pack of demonic Rakosh (Rakoshi, plural). While the name of the creatures is not an exact match for Rakshasa, the correspondence of origin, name, and demonic character is clear.
- A group of rakshasas makes a brief appearance in Neil Gaiman's novel American Gods.
- A Rakshasa turns out to be the primary villain in The Iron Ring, a fantasy book by Lloyd Alexander.
- In Chaos Comics, Rakshasa is the girlfriend of the lesbian vampiress Purgatori. Rak was the child of demon rape, when her English missionary mother was attacked by a Rakshasa demon.
- Rakshasa is the name of one of the three Loki accidentally released by Tiger in Sword-Singer by Jennifer Roberson.
- Rakshasa feature in the original novel Resurrecting Ravana based on the Buffy the Vampire Slayer TV series.
- In The Last Vampire, a Rakshasa is briefly mentioned as the cause of a plague that ravages Sita's village, and the priest that comes to this conclusion attempts to summon a Yakshini to destroy the Rakshasa, setting the story in motion.
- Rakshasas have a major role in the Game World Trilogy by Samit Basu. The trilogy includes The Simoqin Prophecies, The Manticore's Secret and The Unwaba Revelations. Here the rakshasas are magical creatures, know plenty of magic themselves, see humans as snacks, are efficient shape-shifters and have a country of their own, called Imokoi. Their chief, a combination of Harry Potter's Voldemort and the Ramayan's Ravan, is known as the Dark Lord.
- Rakshasa feature in Benedict Jacka's novels Cursed and Taken.
- The light novel series Campione! involves characters called Campioni ("champions") who kill a god and thereby steal that god's power. Rakshasa Monarch is one of the many names that Campioni are known by; they are believed by Japanese mages to be reincarnations of a Rakshasa King.
- In the Doctor Who Virgin New Adventures novel All-Consuming Fire, an alien menace turns its slaves into winged demons, which are referred to as "Rakshassa".
- In Rakasha: Legend of the Hindi Tiger Demon, the short story collection by Robert B. Davis, a Rakasha serves as the primary antagonist.
- In the Japanese light novel series Chivalry of a Failed Knight (Rakudai Kishi no Eiyuutan or Rakudai Kishi no Cavalry) by Riku Misora, one of the main character Ikki Kurogane's supernatural martial arts techniques is called Ittou Rasetsu, meaning "single-strike rakshasa" (rasetsu being Japanese for "rakshasa").
- In the Steampunk novel Prudence by Gail Carriger, the Rakshasas are a vampire-like people in India. They co-operate with the British East India Company and serve as tax collectors.
- Argentinean creators Eduardo Mazzitelli and Enrique Alcatena created a hardcover comic book rating just over one hundred pages in early 2022, named after and featuring the Rakshasas.

== Video games ==
- In the Exile and Avernum series of games, Rakshasas are magic-casting tiger lookalikes; they're one of the nastier adversaries in the later stages of the game.
- In Linley's Dungeon Crawl roguelike game, the Rakshasa is a type of monster found in the main dungeon levels, and able to create illusionary copies of itself.
- In the video game FreeSpace 2 the Rakshasa is a class of enemy Shivan cruiser.
- In the MMORPG Tantra Online, Rakshasa is a character class resembling a female assassin.
- In the game Final Fantasy (packaged with Final Fantasy II and released as Final Fantasy Origins by Square for PlayStation), there is a tiger-headed creature called a Rakshasa which is a tough spellcaster. This name has been retained in the Game Boy Advance (Dawn of Souls) and PlayStation Portable (20th Anniversary) releases. In the original Final Fantasy for the Nintendo Entertainment System, this was shortened to "Mancat" due to the constraints of the 8-bit machine.
- In Final Fantasy XII, many inhabitants of the sky-city Bhujerba call the monsters from the nearby mines Raksas, derived from Rakshasas.
- In The Legend of Heroes: Trails of Cold Steel II and its follow-up, a character named Aurelia Le Guin is also known for her alias, Golden Rakshasa.
- Rakshasas are demons in the Megami Tensei series and its spinoffs, including Persona 5. In Shin Megami Tensei: Nocturne, the demon known in other games as Vetala was named Rakshasa in the English localization.
- In the turn-based strategy game Heroes of Might and Magic V, the Rakshasa Rani is a powerful melee unit in the Academy faction. It is humanoid in appearance, but has the head of a tiger and blue skin, with glowing lower arms and legs. The upgraded units, Rakshasa Raja and Rakshasa Kshatra, have the head of a lion and four arms. The Rakshasa are supposed to be vengeful spirits whom the wizards have learned to control. In Heroes of Might and Magic VII, Rakshasas and Rakshasa Rajas appear again as Academy creatures, depicted as half‑human, half‑feline Beastmen who combine feral speed and swordsmanship with enchanted weapons granted by their wizard masters.
- In Summoners War: Sky Arena, Rakshasa are female, humanoid, whip wielding monsters.
- In Hatsune Miku: Project DIVA F 2nd and Hatsune Miku: Project DIVA Extend, the song Close and Open, Demons and the Dead (also known by the other translation of its title: Hold, Release; Rakshasa and Carcasses) mentions Rakshasa.
- In Far Cry 4, the Rakshasa are featured as invaders of Shangri-La. They take many forms including masked humanoids, dogs, and fish, as well as an enormous bird that appears to act as their leader.
- In Halo Infinite, one of the available armor cores bears the name Rakshasa
- In Elden Ring, Rakshasa is an optional boss.
- In UFO 50, one of the games is titled Rakshasa.

== Role-playing games ==
- Rakshasa have long been a race of villains in the Dungeons & Dragons role-playing game. They appear as animal-headed humanoids (generally with tiger or monkey heads) with their hands inverted (palms of its hands are where the backs of the hands would be on a human). They are masters of necromancy, enchantment, and illusion (which they mostly use to disguise themselves) and are very hard to kill.
- Magic: The Gathering features a wide variety of Rakshasa in the "Khans of Tarkir" Block, appear as the cat-headed humanoids similar to the Dungeons & Dragons's Rakshasa. Later when Wizards of the Coast bringing the "Khans of Tarkir" Block to the video game Magic: The Gathering Arena, they remove the Cat subtype and update the visual to better represent the actual Rakshasa.
- The Palladium RPG has Rakshasas as a race of Demons, but here, it is spelled "Raksasha".
- In the White Wolf game Exalted, the raksha is the name by which the Fair Folk refer to themselves as a race.
- In the new World of Darkness game, Vampire: the Requiem, the Rakshasa are a bloodline of the Nosferatu.
- In the BattleTech universe, the Rakshasa is a 75-ton Battlemech. An attempted copy of the signature Mad Cat (Timber Wolf) design.

== Films and television ==
- Although not particularly common in Western fiction, the short-lived 1974 television series Kolchak: The Night Stalker (which influenced The X-Files) has an episode (Horror in the Heights) featuring a Rakshasa which—like its Dungeons & Dragons counterpart—is vulnerable to blessed crossbow bolts. The rakshasa preyed upon its victims by magically disguising itself in the image of people that its victims trusted until it was about to strike.
- Rakshasa are referenced in the Outer Limits episode, "Under the Bed" an episode about child-stealing myths. Also mentioned were Baba Yaga, Norse Trolls, Jinn, and the Boogeyman.
- A Rakshasa was featured in the Supernatural episode "Everybody Loves a Clown".
- The Rakshasa were one of the Nietzschean prides in the TV series Andromeda (for example, season 4 episode "Harper-Delete")
- In the film World War Z, the Indians refer to the hordes of infected zombies as "rakshasa".
- The song "Circle of Cysquatch" by progressive Metal band Mastodon makes reference to Rakshasa.
- In the series The Secret Saturdays, the Rakshasa is depicted as a large purple cat-like creature with limited shapeshifting powers.
