= Rakshasa (disambiguation) =

A Rakshasa is a malevolent being in Hinduism and Buddhism.

Rakshasa may also refer to:

- Rakshasa kingdom, Hindu mythological kingdom
- Rakshasa in fiction, the use of Rakshasas in fiction
- Rakshasa (amatya), character in the ancient Indian drama Mudrarakshasa by Vishakhadatta, amatya (minister) of the Nanda Empire
- Rakshasa (Dungeons & Dragons), creatures in the role-playing game Dungeons & Dragons
- Rakshassu, a 1984 Indian film
- Rakshasa (2005 film), an Indian Kannada-language film
- Rakshasa (2025 film), an Indian Kannada-language horror thriller film
- Rakshas (film), a 2018 Indian film
- Bhagwat Chapter One: Raakshas, a 2025 Indian Hindi-language crime thriller film
- Rakshasa Rajavu, a 2001 Indian Malayalam-language film

== See also ==
- Brahmarakshasa, a type of rakshasa
- Ratchagan, a 1997 Indian film
- Ratsasan, 2018 Indian film by Ram Kumar
- Raatchasi, 2019 Indian film by Sy Gowthamraj
- Rakkhosh, a 2019 Indian film
- Rakshasudu (disambiguation)
- Raksha (disambiguation)
