= Celia Calle =

American fashion designer, comic book penciller

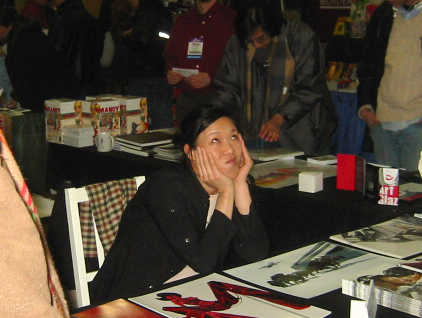
- Celia Calle New York Comic Con
- Born: August 30; Boston, Massachusetts
- Known for: graphic designer, illustrator, comic books

Celia Calle is a Boston-born and New York City-based illustrator, fashion designer and comic book penciller. Educated at the Parsons School of Design, Calle began her career as a costume designer before eventually turning to illustration. Her illustration work has included the cover art for comic books such as Vertigo Comics' American Virgin (#15-#23), Virgin Comics' Walk-In and Seven Brothers, and Marvel Comics' Mekanix. Other illustration credits include work with ESPN Magazine, Adidas, Nike and MTV Networks. Calle's illustrations were included in the first issue of IDW Publishing's magazine Swallow. She's currently working on an adaptation of Emily Brontë's Wuthering Heights.
