= Spider-Man (Pavitr Prabhakar) =

Marvel Comics superhero

Pavitr Prabhakar Spider-Man
- Spider-Man (Pavitr Prabhakar) taken from the cover of Spider-Man: India #2 (February 2005); Art by Jeevan J. Kang.

Publication information
- Publisher: Marvel Comics
- First appearance: Spider-Man: India #1 (2004)
- Created by: Jeevan J. Kang; Suresh Seetharaman; Sharad Devarajan

In-story information
- Alter ego: Pavitr Prabhakar
- Species: Human mutate
- Place of origin: Mumbai/Mumbattan, India
- Supporting character of: Meera Jain (Indian alternate version of Mary Jane Watson); Uncle Bhim (Indian alternate version of Uncle Ben); Aunt Maya (Indian alternate version of Aunt May); Pukar Basnet (Indian alternate version of Ned Leeds)
- Notable aliases: Evaraj Singh
- Abilities: Superhuman strength, speed, agility, reflexes, durability, and balance: Ability to cling to solid surfaces; Expert hand-to-hand combatant; Acrobatics

Altered in-story information for adaptations to other media
- Partnerships: Gayatri Singh (girlfriend); Inspector Singh (police chief); Spider-Woman; Miles Morales; Spider-Man; Spider-Punk; SP//dr; Spider-Ham; Spider-Man Noir

Spider-Man is a superhero appearing in American comic books published by Marvel Comics in collaboration with Gotham Entertainment. Pavitr Prabhakar is an Indian alternate version of Spider-Man who lives in Mumbai, India.

In the Marvel Comics universe, Spider-Man lives on Earth-50101. His secret identity is Pavitr Prabhakar, a shy high school student living with his Aunt Maya and Uncle Bhim in Mumbai. He has several supporting characters, such as Meera Jain, Flash Thompson, Nalin Oberoi, and Doctor Octopus. Pavitr moved to Mumbai from a small village. Despite financial struggles, his uncle was determined for him to receive a good education at the Heritage International School, one of the top schools in Mumbai.

Pavitr was often bullied in school for being from a village and wearing a dhoti. A Yogi gives him the magical powers of a spider, which he uses to fight Nalin Oberoi, an evil businessman searching for a powerful, magical amulet. In his quest, Oberoi destroys Pavitr's village, killing everyone. As Spider-Man, Pavitr defeats Oberoi and hands him over to the police.

Pavitr "Pav" Prabhakar / Spider-Man India made his cinematic debut in the 2023 animated feature film Spider-Man: Across the Spider-Verse, voiced by Karan Soni in English. He is depicted as a member of Miguel O'Hara's Spider-Society. He is set to reappear in the film's sequel, Spider-Man: Beyond the Spider-Verse.

== Publishing history ==
Pavitr Prabhakar first appeared in Spider-Man: India #1 (January 2005). Marvel created this Indian version in collaboration with the Gotham Entertainment Group, with Debdatta Das as a co-creator.

== Fictional character biography ==
Pavitr Prabhakar, an Indian boy from a remote village, moves to Mumbai with the encouragement of his aunt Maya and Uncle Bhim after receiving a partial scholarship to attend Heritage International School, a prestigious academy. At school, he is frequently bullied for his rural background. His uncle urges him to endure the challenges and stay in school, believing in his potential. A popular girl, Meera Jain, befriends him after they bond over their shared experience of moving to the city from a small village.

Meanwhile, a local crime lord named Nalin Oberoi uses an amulet to perform an ancient ritual, becoming possessed by a demon intent on opening a gate for other demons to invade Earth. While being chased by bullies, Pavitr encounters an ancient yogi who grants him the powers of a spider to combat the evil threatening the world. Pavitr dons the iconic Spider-Man costume and tests his new abilities, such as creating webs and clinging to walls. While exploring his powers, Pavitr witnesses a woman being attacked but dismisses it, thinking the police will intervene. Unbeknownst to him, his uncle attempts to help the woman and is fatally injured. Hearing his uncle's cry, Pavitr rushes to the scene, but it's too late. Overcome with grief, he confronts the attackers, nearly killing them before regaining control. He then realises that with great power comes great responsibility, and vows to use his abilities to protect others.

Nalin Oberoi briefly reverts to human form and transforms a mild-mannered doctor into a demon with four magical tentacles (the Indian version of Doctor Octopus), sending him to kill Spider-Man as instructed by the demon voices. "Doc Ock" fails, and Spider-Man makes his public debut as a hero. However, the newspapers label him a threat.

Oberoi kidnaps Pavitr's aunt and takes her to a refinery outside Mumbai. There, he betrays Doctor Octopus, blasting him into the ocean. Spider-Man arrives to fight Oberoi, who has also kidnapped Meera. Oberoi drops both Maya and Meera from the top of the refinery. Spider-Man dives to save his aunt but fails to rescue Meera, who is saved by Doctor Octopus. Pavitr reveals his identity to Meera and asks her to take his aunt to safety.

Oberoi finally eliminates Doctor Octopus and touches Spider-Man with the amulet. A Venom-like creature emerges from the amulet, attempting to lure Spider-Man to the dark side. Pavitr remembers his uncle's words about responsibility and rejects the evil, shattering the link between Oberoi and the demons, turning Oberoi human again. Spider-Man throws the amulet into the ocean, and Oberoi is sent to a mental institution.

Peace returns to Mumbai. Pavitr begins a romance with Meera and is seen celebrating Diwali with his aunt. The story concludes with a quote from the Bhagavad Gita, hinting that the Venom-Demon is alive.

=== Spider-Verse ===
During the Spider-Verse storyline, which featured Spider-Men from various alternate realities, Pavitr Prabhakar fought a mysterious new villain named Karn, whom he mistook for a demon. The Superior Spider-Man (Doctor Octopus' mind in Peter Parker's body) saved him and recruited him into his army of Spiders. In the second volume of Spider-Verse, set during the Secret Wars event, Pavitr found himself in the domain of Battleworld called Arachnia, where he teamed up with Spider-Gwen, Spider-Ham, Spider-Man Noir, Spider-UK, and Anya Corazon, although none of them remembered their previous encounter during the original Spider-Verse.

Following the conclusion of Secret Wars, the team of six Spiders that formed during the event was renamed and featured in a new ongoing series called Web Warriors, a name coined by Peter Parker from the Ultimate Spider-Man TV series during the original Spider-Verse.

=== Spider-Geddon ===
During the Spider-Geddon storyline, Pavitr, along with Spider-Girl, Spider-Punk, Spider-UK, and Master Weaver, has been monitoring Earth-3145. They discover that the Inheritors have become malnourished since their last appearance.

== In other media ==
=== Film ===
Pavitr Prabhakar as he appears in Across the Spider-Verse.

- Pavitr "Pav" Prabhakar / Spider-Man India appears in Spider-Man: Across the Spider-Verse (2023), voiced by Karan Soni. This version is a member of Miguel O'Hara's Spider Society and a friend of Spider-Punk and Spider-Woman. He lives in Mumbattan, an Indian city based on Mumbai and Manhattan, and is dating Inspector Singh's daughter, Gayatri. His fighting style is inspired by the Indian martial art kalaripayattu.
  - Pavitr was also voiced in Hindi and Punjabi by cricketer Shubman Gill.
  - Pavitr Prabhakar is set to return in the upcoming sequel Spider-Man: Beyond the Spider-Verse (2027).

=== Video games ===
- Pavitr Prabhakar appears as an unlockable playable character in Spider-Man Unlimited.
- Pavitr Prabhakar appears as an unlockable playable character in Marvel Strike Force.
- Spider-Man (Pavitr Prabhakar) appears as a playable character in Marvel Contest of Champions.

== Reception ==
James Whitbrook of io9 ranked Pavitr fourteenth among the greatest alternate versions of Spider-Man, stating that he "shares much in common with the general Spider-Man legacy, but he's probably the best example of a foreign Spider-Man Marvel's ever attempted." Ryan Linch of Screen Rant ranked Pavitr tenth, noting that the character "has some really clever deviations from his American counterparts, but still retains everything that makes Spider-Man great."
