= Raksha =

Raksha (lit. 'protection' in Indian languages) may refer to:

== Film and literature ==
- Raksha (1982 film), a 1982 Hindi action film
- Raksha (2008 film), a 2008 Telugu horror film
- Rakshas (film), a 2018 Marathi fantasy film
- Racha (film), a 2012 Telugu film release in Hindi as Raksha
- Raksha (The Jungle Book), a character from Rudyard Kipling's The Jungle Book
- Raksha, a group of mutants in Marvel Comics

== People ==
- Raksha Khadase (born 1987), Indian politician

== Places ==
- Ragsha, also known as Rakshā, a village in Iran

== Religion and philosophy ==
- Raksha Bandhan, an Indian religious festival
- Raksha Sainyam, the Salvation Army in Kerala, India
- Raksha (Vedic), a Hindu philosophical concept
- Rakshasa, mythological being in Hinduism and Buddhism

== Universities ==
- Raksha Shakti University

== See also ==
- Rakshasa (disambiguation)
