= India Authentic =

Comic book

- Cover to issue #1 of India Authentic: Ganesha (May 2007). Pencils, inks and colors by Abhishek Singh.

Publication information
- Publisher: Virgin Comics
- Schedule: Monthly
- Format: Ongoing series
- Publication date: May 2007-

Creative team
- Created by: Deepak Chopra
- Written by: Saurav Mohapatra
- Penciller(s): Abhishek Singh, Satish Tayade, M. Subramanian
- Inker(s): Abhishek Singh, Satish Tayade, M. Subramanian
- Colorist(s): Abhishek Singh, Satish Tayade, Narasimhamurthy M.N.

Deepak Chopra's India Authentic is a series of one-shot comic books from Virgin Comics which re-tell the iconic myths and legends of India for a global audience. The series has been created by Deepak Chopra (with Saurav Mohapatra), who also presents the foreword for each issue. The first five issues were collected as the 'Book of Shiva'. The next will likely be collected as a 'Book of Vishnu'.

== Credits ==
The series is the creation of Deepak Chopra and is written by Saurav Mohapatra. This features art by many of Virgin Comics' artists like Abhishek Singh (Ramayan 3392 A.D.), Satish Tayade (Kama Sutra) and others.

== Plot summary ==
=== Issue #1: Ganesha ===
The first issue recounts the story of the birth of Ganesha, son of Shiva, who gave up his life for a promise made to his mother, Uma.

=== Issue #2: Kali ===
The second issue recounts the story of the awakening of Kali, an unstoppable destroyer, who was summoned by the gods to battle a demonic army.

=== Issue #3: Indra ===
The third issue recounts the story of the battle between Indra, king of the heavens, and the serpent demon Vritra.

=== Issue #4: Uma ===
The fourth issue recounts the story of Uma and her quest to win the heart of Shiva.

=== Issue #5: Shiva ===
This issue tells the story of Shiva, the destroyer, and the churning of the primordial ocean.

=== Issue #6: Vishnu (Narasimha Avatara) ===
This issue tells the story of Narasimha, the fourth incarnation of Vishnu, who defended the people of Earth against a demon overlord.

=== Issue #7: Yama ===
This issue tells the story of Yama, the lord of death, who rules over the underworld Naraka.

=== Issue #8: Garuda ===
This issue tells the story of Garuda, the mighty Eagle-headed god, the Avian warrior.

=== Issue #9: Kartikkeya ===
This issue tells the story of Kartikkeya, also called Murugan, the son of Shiva and Uma

=== Issue #10: Parshuram ===
This issue tells the story of Parashurama Bhargava, and his vendetta against the kings.

=== Issue #11: Hanuman ===
from the pages of Ramayana, the story of the mighty warrior Hanuman

=== Issue #16: The Saffron Princess ===
Created by: Deepak Chopra, Written by: Yogesh Chandekar, Art & Cover by: Virgin Studios

The narrative follows Prince Gulfaam after he rescues a large black panther leading him to discover a hidden realm of talking animals and a forgotten kingdom. There, he meets the "Saffron Princess," who has been targeted by a scheme that Prince Gulfaam and the panther attempt to thwart.

== Critical reception ==
The reception for this series has been generally positive .

== Collected Editions ==
There are currently two volumes of collected editions available as trade paperbacks.

- India Authentic Vol 1 : Book of Shiva (Collecting issues #1-5) ISBN 1934413089
- India Authentic Vol 2 (Collecting issues #6-10) ISBN 1934413151

== See also ==
- Saurav Mohapatra
- Virgin Comics
- Indian comics
- Amar Chitra Katha
