= Saurav Mohapatra =

Writer and filmmaker

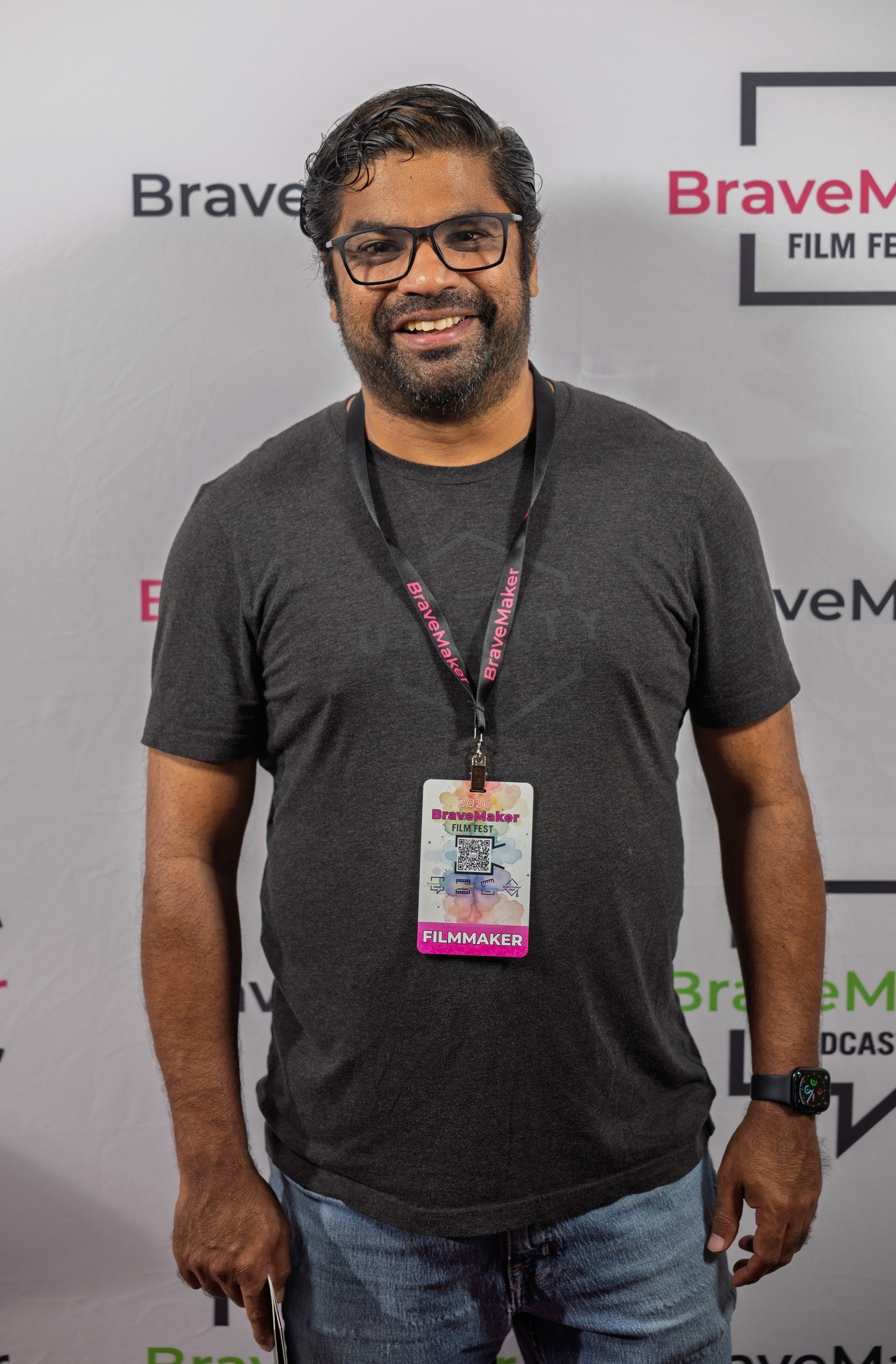
- Mohapatra at the BraveMaker Film Festival in 2026
- Born: 1978 (age 47–48); Khurda, India
- Occupations: Writer, Filmmaker
- Writing career
- Period: 2006 –
- Website: www.sauravmohapatra.com

Saurav Mohapatra is a filmmaker and writer based out of San Francisco, California, USA.

== Work ==
His comic book work includes the Devi (#11 onwards), The Sadhu : "The Silent Ones" and Deepak Chopra's India Authentic from Virgin Comics. He is the co-creator/writer of the crime-noir comic book series Mumbai Confidential from Archaia. His recent work includes Bibhutibhushan Bandyopadhyay’s Chander pahar into a graphic novel called Moon Mountain for Penguin Random House (India) and Sholay: Gabbar, an authorized prequel graphic novel for the iconic Hindi feature film Sholay.

He wrote all eight episodes of season one of the streaming series Nakaab (directed by Soumik Sen and starring Mallika Sherawat, Esha Gupta, and Gautam Rode) that released on MX Player on 15 September 2021.

As a filmmaker, he's known for his short film The First Rule, that he wrote and directed. The First Rule won the award for "Best International Short Film" at the Port Blair International Film Festival, 2021.

== Biography ==
Born in 1978 in Khurda, India, Mohapatra attended the Indian Institute of Technology, Kharagpur and later emigrated to United States in 2000.

He was also the co-founder of Dimdim inc., an open source web conferencing company (acquired by Salesforce.com in 2011).

== Bibliography ==
- Sholay: Gabbar (Westland/Graphic India)
- Way of the Warrior, The Legend of Abhimanyu (Penguin India)
- Moon Mountain (Penguin India)
- Mumbai Confidential (Archaia)
- Witchblade (issues 140-141 co-written with Ron Marz (Top Cow)
- India Authentic (Virgin Comics)
- Devi #11-onwards (Virgin Comics)
- The Sadhu : "The Silent Ones" (Virgin Comics)
- Jimmy Zhingchak - Agent of D.I.S.C.O. (one shot) (Virgin Comics)
- Mumbai Macguffin (one shot) (Virgin Comics)

== Filmography ==
- Amelia runs through a meadow (2024) (short film) (writer/director)
- The Ukulele (2023) (short film) (writer/director)
- A Good Fight (2022) (short film) (writer/director) - Winner "Best Action/Adventure Short Film" at Another Hole in the Head Film Festival 2022
- Nakaab (2021) (streaming series) (MXPlayer) (writer) - Season 1
- The First Rule (2021) (short film) (writer/director) - Winner "Best International Short Film" award at Port Blair International Film Festival 2021
- Cora (2020) (short film) (writer/director)
- Lathe (2020) (short film) (writer/director)

== See also ==
- Indian comics
- Virgin Comics

| Preceded by Samit Basu | Devi writer 2007 | Succeeded by – |
| Preceded by – | India Authentic writer 2007 | Succeeded by – |
