= Walk-in =

Walk-in can refer to:

- Walk In, 1997 Hong Kong film directed by Herman Yau
- The Walk-In (TV series), a British TV crime drama series
- "The Walk In" (The Americans), an episode of the US TV series The Americans
- Walk-in agent
- Walk-in (concept)
- A large refrigerator or freezer installed in a industrial kitchen that allows a human being to enter
- Walk-In (comics), a 2006 comic book series
- Walk-in closet
- Walk-in clinic
