= Transcreation =

Process of creatively adapting a message from one language to another

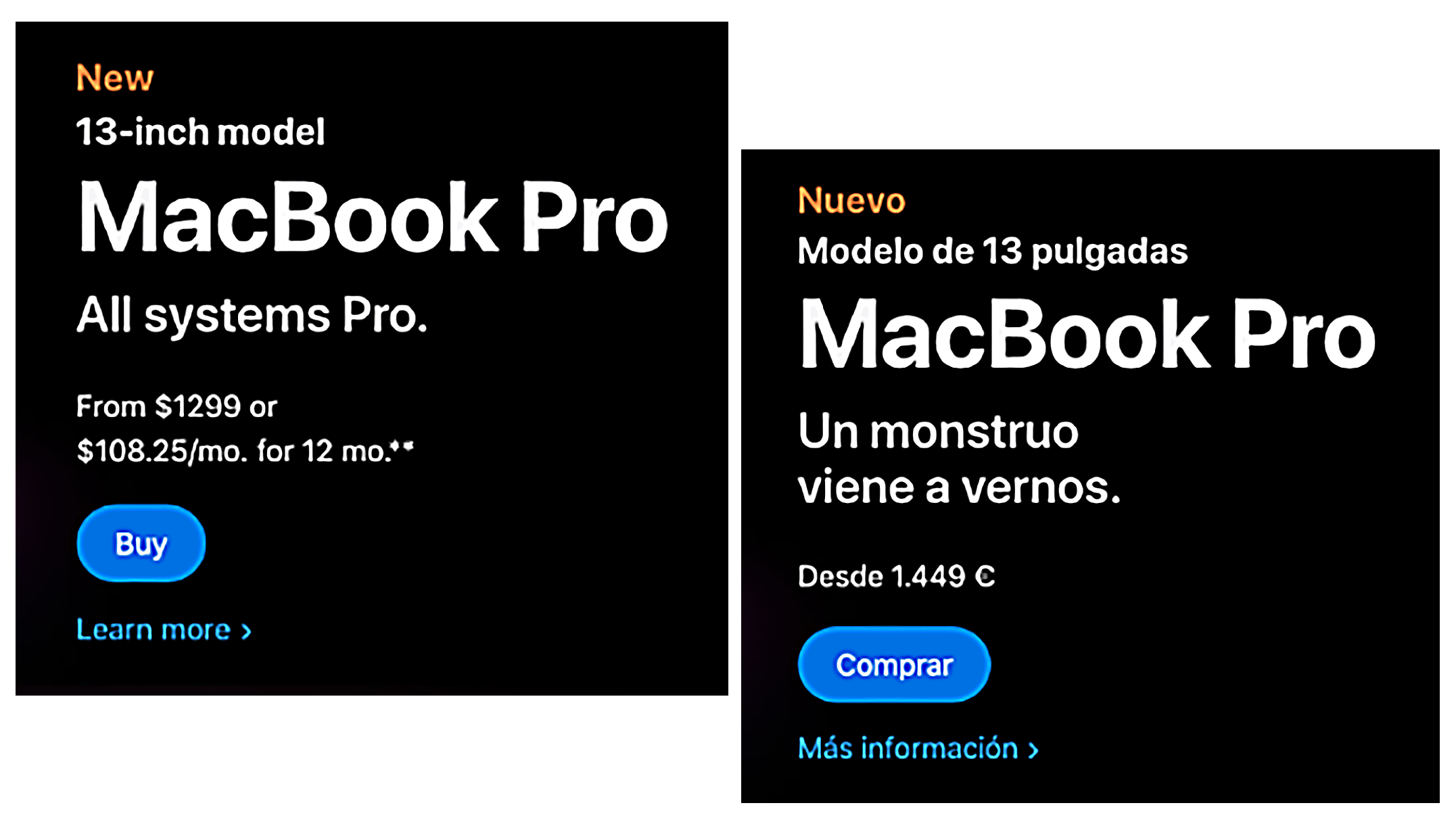

Transcreation is a term coined from the words "translation" and "creation", and a concept used in the field of translation studies to describe the process of adapting a message from one language to another, while maintaining its intent, style, tone, and context. A successfully transcreated message evokes the same emotions and carries the same implications in the target language as it does in the source language. It is related to the concept of localization, which similarly involves comprehensively adapting a translated text for the target audience. Transcreation highlights the translator's creative role. Unlike many other forms of translation, transcreation also often involves adapting not only words, but video and images to the target audience. Transcreation theory was first developed in the field of literary translation, and began to be adapted for use global marketing and advertising in the early 21st century. The transcreation approach is also heavily used today in the translation of video games and mobile apps.

The concept of transcreation emphasizes the translator's independent creative role. In the context of marketing, the professional translators engaging in transcreation are often referred to as "copywriters" or "copyeditors", or alternatively as "transcreators".

Transcreation is a term from Leibnizian philosophy dating back to 1676. It is a holistic approach, working on creating content from the source and applying it to the target using a translation technique. Changes made during transcreation have reasons, kinds, degrees, levels and limits.

== Background ==
The concept of transcreation was first developed by translators in India and Brazil in the mid-20th century. In 1964, the Indian scholar Purushottama Lal wrote, regarding contemporary translations of the Sanskrit classics, that "the translator must edit, reconcile, and transmute; his job in many ways becomes largely a matter of transcreation". In the Brazilian context, the term is associated with the work of Haroldo de Campos, who compared transcreation to the giving of a blood transfusion.

The term is also recognized in China. In 2010, the Chinese design and advertising publication, Modern Advertising Magazine, discussed the term in an article for the first time.

== Examples ==
Transcreation has been found in such fields as literature, marketing, advertising, video-games, websites, information materials, and mobile applications.

In popular culture, one example of the use of a strongly transcreational approach is in the United States adaptation of the Japanese anime Doraemon, in which characters and settings were dramatically modified to suit United States sensibilities. For example, depictions of Japanese yen notes were replaced by United States currency, and a stand selling roasted sweet potato was replaced by a food truck selling popcorn.

Similarly, the United States story of Spider-Man was transcreated for Indian audiences in Spider-Man: India, which is set in Mumbai. This transcreated Spider-Man features an Indian-born Spider-Man whose "real" name is Pavitr Prabhakar. Thus, rather than battling the Green Goblin in the canyons of New York City, Prabhakar, clad in a dhoti, fights the demon Rahshasa against backdrops such as the Taj Mahal. "Unlike traditional translations of American comics, Spider-Man India will become the first-ever 'transcreation', where we reinvent the origin of a Western property," said Sharad Devarajan, the chief executive of the Gotham Entertainment Group. The goal in this case closely matched that of cross-cultural marketers: to make Spider-Man more relevant to the Indian audience, establish a deeper emotional connection with readers, and thus sell more comic books.

The concept of transcreation has also been applied to other specialized fields such as technical and legal translation. For example, the creation of new technical vocabulary by specialized Icelandic translators in the mid-20th century has been retrospectively characterized as transcreation. Accordingly, one author has defined transcreation as a "holistic" process of "re-interpretation of the original work suited to the readers/audience of the target language which requires the translator to come up with new conceptual, linguistic and cultural constructs to make up for the lack (or inadequacy) of existing ones."

== Purpose ==
As advertisers expand into new markets, there is an incentive to transcend language and cultural boundaries. As well as obtaining correct translations of copy, other factors such as culture, mores, dialects, idiom, humor, and context are considered. Any perceived lack of respect for local heritage, values, beliefs and cultures may have a negative impact on consumers, which is why companies that market internationally are increasingly using transcreation, whether via their advertising company or with a company specializing in transcreation.

The tasks of a transcreator include establishing an emotional connection between the audience and the message, and maximizing cultural relevance. Many factors may differ across cultural and linguistic boundaries and must be considered, such as cultural heritage, shared values, practices, prevalent social cueing, reception thereof, expression of emotions, gestures, body language, and facial expressions. These factors in turn influence consumers' behavior and their reactions to advertising elements such as text, tone of voice, humor, settings, casting, and tonality.

Transcreation can also have a positive impact on a website's SEO performance, as search engines favour user experience and content quality.

== Relationship to translation ==
Classically, in a schema dating from the 17th century, translation has been divided into three approaches: metaphrase (word-for-word translation), paraphrase (i.e. "say in other words"), and imitation. Transcreation is thus a variation on the "imitation" or "adaptation" approach to translation. Similarly, viewed in terms of the continuum between free translation and literal translation, transcreation is considered to be "closest to 'free' on the literal – free cline."

The validity of transcreation as a distinct form of translation, however, has been questioned. While the term has been widely embraced by translation brokers seeking new business, it has been greeted with considerably more skepticism by professional translators.

== Commercial use ==
In the 21st century, some translation agencies began to specifically market themselves as transcreation agencies. Transcreation allows local marketers to take the essence of a global advertising message and tailor it to their market. Thus, a global advertising campaign subjected to transcreation becomes more supple, while still adhering to an overall global strategy.

Accordingly, the rise of transcreation has paralleled the growth in international marketing campaigns. In 1960, international billings accounted for 6% of the gross revenues of the top ten U.S. advertising agencies. By 1991, that share had climbed to 60%, and it has been rising ever since, in line with the "think global; act local" principle.

== See also ==
- Language localisation
