= Sharad Devarajan =

American comic book publisher

- Born: New York, USA
- Education: Syracuse University, BFA Columbia Business School, MBA
- Occupations: Media entrepreneur, author, superhero creator, screenwriter, film and television producer, adjunct professor
- Employer(s): Liquid Comics, Graphic India, Columbia Business School

Sharad Devarajan is the co-founder and CEO of Liquid Comics LLC, a digital entertainment company. Devarajan is also the co-founder and CEO of the Graphic India, which he co-founded with CA Media LP, the Asian investment arm of Peter Chernin's The Chernin Group, LLC.

== Career ==
Devarajan has also served as an adjunct professor of business at Columbia Business School, Columbia University in New York City, for over fifteen years, where he teaches classes on media, entrepreneurship and innovation, including the courses "Media, Marketing and Entrepreneurship" and "Virtual Reality and Artificial Intelligence".

Forbes magazine described Devarajan as 'The Indian Marvel' comparing him as the Stan Lee of India.

In film, Devarajan was a Producer on the live action film, The Archies for Netflix, based on the global comic book series. The film was directed by filmmaker Zoya Akhtar and produced by Tiger Baby Films and Graphic India. The film was prominently featured at the 54th International Film Festival of India on 22 November 2023. In its first week of release the film was #3 on the Netflix global top 10 films (non-English) list. The film also reached #2 on the Netflix India top 10 films list for the first two weeks post release. Robert Lloyd of The Los Angeles Times wrote in his review that the film was "a joyous Bollywoodification of beloved American comic book characters that would be on my year-end list if that weren't already in the can" and further added, "if you want to schedule it as part of your dedicated holiday viewing. The year will bring you no better present."

Devarajan is also the co-creator, writer, showrunner & Executive Producer on the Disney+Hotstar series, The Legend of Hanuman which became one of the top binged and top watched shows across all streaming platforms in India in 2021 and is currently in production for its third season for release in 2024. The series is the most viewed animated streaming series in Indian history and broke records on Disney+Hotstar with over 8.5 million views in the first 10 days of release. The Legend of Hanuman received one of the highest audience ratings on IMDb of any original Indian streaming series with a 9.2/10 and a google audience rating of 4.9/5.0.

In 2023, the animated feature film Spider-Man: Across the Spider-Verse, featured Spider-Man India, a character created by Devarajan. In 2004, Devarajan worked with Marvel as the creator of a new version of Spider-Man as an Indian boy growing up in Mumbai, transforming Peter Parker into Pavitr Prabhakar. His series, Spider-Man: India was heralded as one of the industry's first "trans-creations." Devarajan's character was pivotal to the success of Spider-Man: Across the Spider-Verse becoming the highest grossing animated theatrical film ever released in India.

Since 2015, Devarajan has worked with filmmaker S. S. Rajamouli and producer Shobu Yarlagadda of Arka Media Works to architect the transmedia strategy around the Indian film franchise, Baahubali: The Beginning and Baahubali 2: The Conclusion. The two films collectively grossed over US$360 Million at the global box office. Devarajan developed the publishing, gaming and animation strategy for the franchise and was also the co-creator, writer, and Executive Producer of the animated series Baahubali: The Lost Legends, which premiered on Amazon Prime Video in India. The series continued for five seasons with 71 episodes produced.

In 2022, Devarajan partnered with producer and actress, Mila Kunis and Emmy-nominated writer, Hugh Sterbakov to launch the mythic-fantasy comic series and game franchise Armored Kingdom.

Devarajan also worked closely with Marvel Comics founder and icon, Stan Lee to create a new Indian superhero, Chakra the Invincible which debuted on Cartoon Network India in 2013 and is now in development as a live action feature film. Devarajan had been a frequent collaborator with Lee over the course of two decades and also worked with him to co-create the superhero character, Monkey Master now in development as a live action feature film with filmmaker John Woo. In a tribute piece in The Times of India upon Lee's death in 2018, Devarajan wrote "Stan Lee was a mentor, friend, inspiration and teacher. He was my guru. As a child, his work shaped my life and spoke to me in a way that no other author or creator ever has, and probably ever will. To have had the honor to create a superhero with Stan Lee was like being able to paint a picture with Picasso or write a poem with Shakespeare. It was quite simply one of the greatest joys of my life."

In digital entertainment, Devarajan worked with Batman comic book writer Grant Morrison as executive producer and co-writer on Graphic India's digital comic and web series 18 Days, inspired by the Indian epic, The Mahabharata.

At Liquid Comics, Devarajan oversaw the creation of a number of original graphic novel projects that are being developed as live-action Hollywood films or series projects with Devarajan as a producer, including Dominion: Dinosaurs Versus Aliens with Barry Sonnenfeld; The Gamekeeper with filmmaker Guy Ritchie; Coming of Rage with Wes Craven; and Seven Brothers with John Woo. In addition, Devarajan also created Striker Force 7, with Cristiano Ronaldo, as the athlete's first comic book project. The first issue of the comic series was released in 2019 as part of the comic industry's Free Comic Book Day event. At Liquid Comics he also worked with the estate of Elvis Presley to launch a book Graphic Elvis, which he served as editor and co-author of and which was released on the 35th anniversary of Elvis's death.

In 2010, Devarajan partnered with the Open Hands Initiative to bring together a group of American and Middle Eastern students with disabilities to work together and create a new superhero that reflected their shared challenges and shared values. The superhero Silver Scorpion received worldwide acclaim for promoting advocacy for the rights of the disabled in the Middle East.

Describing his love of the comic book medium, Devarajan has said, "The purest medium I always found for art was comic books. It is a place where imagination is unbridled, and you can create the entire universe in a single page or destroy it in the next."

For his work, Devarajan has been a frequent speaker on his efforts in comics and animation to "change the perception of India from being an outsourcer to becoming the source". In 2013, Devarajan gave a TEDx talk in Mumbai on "The Evolution of Superheroes" which has received over 1 million views. He has been featured as a speaker on superheroes and his work at the Fortune Global Forum in 2007, the Paley International Council Summit in 2014, the Wall Street Journal's Tech Live conference in 2015, NPR's Fresh Air, and other media outlets.
