= Mumbai Confidential =

- Cover of "Good Cop, Bad Cop", the first volume in the series

Publication information
- Publisher: Archaia
- Format: Limited series
- Genre: Crime noir
- Publication date: May 2013
- Main character(s): Arjun Kadam; Sunil Sawant; Yateem Qureshi

Creative team
- Created by: Saurav Mohapatra; Vivek Shinde
- Written by: Saurav Mohapatra
- Artist: Vivek Shinde
- Colourist(s): Vivek Shinde; Saurav Mohapatra

Collected editions
- Book 1 "Good Cop, Bad Cop": ISBN 1-9363-9365-4

Mumbai Confidential is a hardboiled comic book series by Saurav Mohapatra and Vivek Shinde, published by Archaia. The story is set in the Indian city of Mumbai against the backdrop of the Mumbai Police Encounter killings, a series of alleged extrajudicial slayings carried out by an elite squad of policemen. The story contains a western crime noir narrative, and a setting and structure inspired by Bollywood movies.

== Publication history ==
The first volume, titled "Good Cop, Bad Cop", was launched at San Diego Comic-Con in July 2012. It was initially made available as a digital comic from Comixology, serialized into a 9-issue run. The hardcover print edition was released on 21 May 2013.

== Plot ==
"Good Cop, Bad Cop" follows the story of Arjun Kadam, a washed-out, drug-addicted ex-cop in Mumbai, as he tries to solve the murder of a street urchin. His investigation brings him face to face with his own murky past as a member of the Encounter Squad of the Mumbai Police. The story begins in media res at the chronological end as Kadam is involved in a bloody shoot-out in the alleys of the Dharavi slums. A series of flashbacks follow his tale as he navigates the Mumbai Underworld, forming alliances with gangsters against his former colleagues, the Encounter Cops.

== Influences ==
Mumbai Confidential is inspired by the "Mumbai gangster noir" movies by Ram Gopal Verma, Anurag Kashyap, and others, including Satya, Company, and Black Friday. Hardboiled crime fiction from the West also has major influences on the series. It is thematically influenced by the Hong Kong crime movies and seminal crime-noir comics like Criminal, Sin City, and 100 Bullets.

== Reception ==
The series has been well received by reviewers, especially for its unique setting (a crime-noir tale set in Mumbai, India). The painted art of the title has also been generally favorably mentioned by reviewers, along with the "grim and gritty" execution of the story.

Publishers Weekly found the book to be "stylish, sophisticated, and metropolitan: a fresh entry in the noir genre with an Asian twist."

Library Journal praised the book's story and art : "The twisty plot, well-tuned slang dialog, and unpredictable characters make this an appealing read for adult crime noir buffs looking for an international take on classic tropes.", while noting the use of "plenty of violence and strong language plus some inexplicit sex."

A review in Paste Magazine criticised the scrambled timeline of the narrative and the varying art style as distracting: "The overall hash (not only the varying quality of the contributions, but also the rearranged chronology of the narrative) resembles Danny Boyle's Slumdog Millionaire, and not just because of the setting. Both are magpies for ideas, more invested in throwing too much at a problem than in simplifying it, and although this tendency makes the result a sort of garbage salad, its provocations have a liveliness that saves the final product to a degree.". The review also pointed out the use of "gratuitous profanity" in the book, while noting that the story played with and subverted classic tropes of hardboiled fiction: "It's rich material, and although Mohapatra relies too much on gratuitous profanity and violence mixed with sentimentality, he also explicitly nods to conventions, like when his protagonist Kadam monologues while mocking the fact that he's doing so."
