= Jimmy Zhingchak =

One-shot comic book written by Saurav Mohapatra

Jimmy Zhingchak - Agent of D.I.S.C.O.

Publication information
- Publisher: Virgin Comics
- Format: One-shot
- Genre: , humor/comedy, superhero
- Publication date: July 2008
- No. of issues: 1
- Main character: D.I.S.C.O.

Creative team
- Created by: Saurav Mohapatra
- Written by: Saurav Mohapatra
- Penciller: Anupam Sinha

Jimmy Zhingchak - Agent of D.I.S.C.O. is a one-shot comic book written by Saurav Mohapatra, with art by Anupam Sinha. It was originally published by Virgin Comics in 2008 in collaboration with UTV Spotboy.

== Plot ==
A parody of the fascination with disco in 1980s Hindi cinema, the film tells the story of Jimmy, a young dancer who helps defend India against the sinister organisation F.I.R.A.N.G., led by Sir John. In his quest, Jimmy is aided by Colonel Jaani of the Department of Internal Security and Covert Operations (D.I.S.C.O.). The foreword was written by Mithun Chakraborty, an Indian film star known for his disco films.

== Themes ==
The comic introduces the concept of 'Zhingchak', which is a nod to both the Force in Star Wars and 'Mojo' from the Austin Powers films. It makes use of hackneyed plot devices commonly found in Hindi films, such as the character of the blind mother, as popularised by Nirupa Roy, miraculous restoration of sight by divine intervention (again a Nirupa Roy staple), and long lost twin brothers.

== See also ==
- Mithun Chakraborty
- Disco Dancer
- Kasam Paida Karne Wale Ki
- Dance Dance
- Classic Dance of Love
- Dance Bangla Dance
- Dance India Dance
