= The Asura Analogues =

Series of comics from Virgin Comics

The Asura Analogues is a series of comics from Virgin Comics, that re-tell stories of the Asura demons prevalent in eastern Hindu and Buddhist mythology, as well as horror stories in general.

== Virulents ==
Virulents is the first issue in the series that was written by Shamik Dasgupta and illustrated by Suryoday De. It features a story revolving around a team of soldiers in Afghanistan, who stumble across an ancient demon from Indian legend.

== Eat the Dead ==
Eat the Dead is the second stand-alone story in the series, written and illustrated by Siddharth Kotain. It features a story about a group of youths who visit a 'haunted' temple, only to encounter their own karmic ghosts.

== The Leaves ==
The Leaves will be the third stand-alone story in the series, written by Kevin J. Walsh and illustrated by Ashwin Chikerur. It features a story about a surgeon who visits India and is declared to be a being by an astrologer, and is forced to flee.

== Critical reception ==
Virulents, the first stand alone story, was highly regarded for its art, and received mixed but generally positive appraisal for its story, which some reviews considered simplistic, and others satisfyingly 'unsettling' and original. Most reviews found the originality of the Indian theme noteworthy, and some praised the realistic racial and political aspects.

== See also ==
- Indian comics
