= Rakshasudu =

Rakshasudu may refer to:

- Rakshasudu (1986 film), an Indian Telugu-language crime action film
- Rakshasudu (2019 film), an Indian Telugu-language psychological thriller film

== See also ==
- Rakshasa (disambiguation)
- Ratchagan or Rakshakudu, a 1997 Indian film
