= Deepak Chopra's Buddha =

Comic book of the Deepak Chapra

Buddha - A Story of Enlightenment
- Cover to issue #1 of Deepak Chopra's Buddha (2008).

Publication information
- Publisher: Virgin Comics
- Schedule: Monthly
- Format: Limited series
- Genre: , historical, philosophical
- Publication date: March - July 2008

Creative team
- Written by: Deepak Chopra, Joshua Dysart
- Artist(s): Harshvardhan Kadam

Deepak Chopra's Buddha is a comic book on the life of Buddha, featuring artwork by Virgin Comics artists, written by Deepak Chopra.

Chopra explained that the six-part series "explores Buddha's life in three phases: the Prince, the Monk, and the Enlightened Buddha. The first phase is full of mystery and adventure. The second focuses on Buddha's seeking the answers to his existential wonderings. And the third phase is about Buddha's enlightenment under the Bodhi tree and as well as his teaching."

It was adapted into a comic mini-series from Chopra's 2007 novel Buddha: A Story of Enlightenment, with art by Harshvardhan Kadan.
