= Abhishek Singh (artist) =

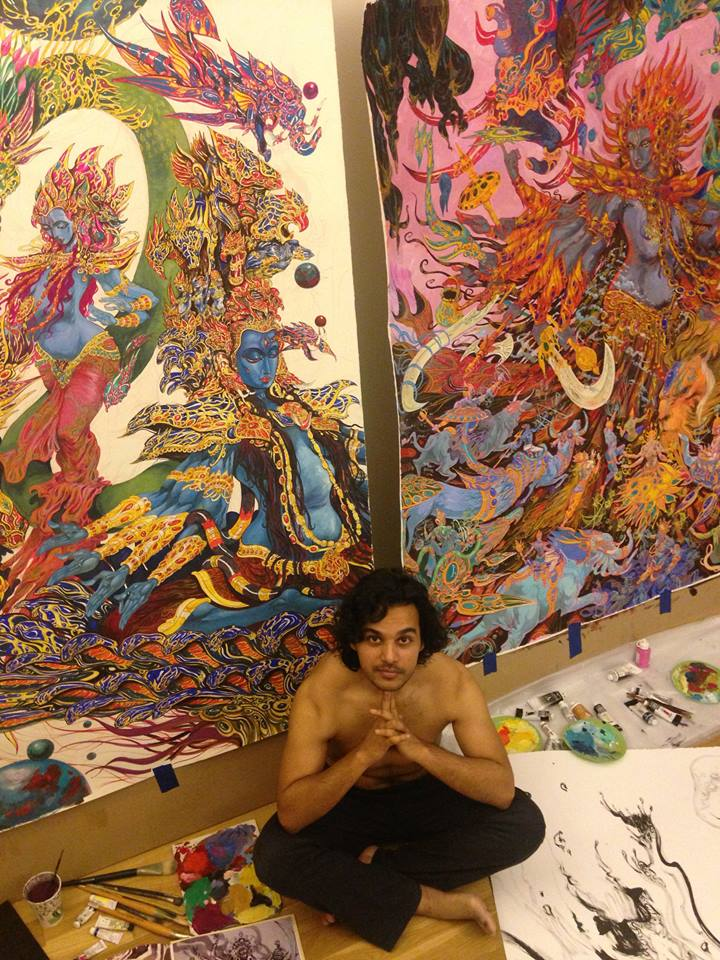
Artist Abhishek Singh in front of his Goddess Paintings. (Left) Triveni – the three aspects of the river; (right) Bhagvati-Shakti creating the gods.

Abhishek Singh (born July 1982) is an Indian graphic novelist acclaimed for his unique interpretations of myths and ancient philosophies instigating environmental themes, universal identity and spiritual oneness.

Singh was born in Gwalior and studied Animation and Film Design at India's National Institute of Design. He is the writer and illustrator for graphic novel KRISHNA: A Journey Within published by Image Comics. He was the illustrator for the Ramayana 3392 A.D and India Authentic comics. His work spans fine-art exhibitions, comic-books, animation and virtual reality films, original futuristic fables and re-imaginations of the mythological stories of India.

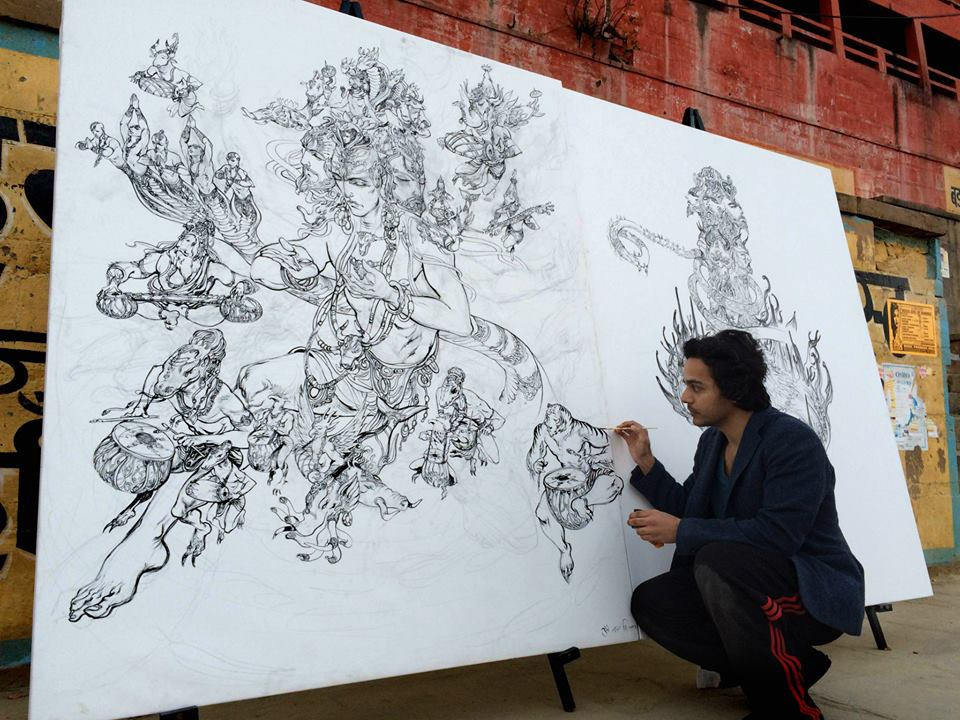
Singh painting Shiva at the ghats of Varanasi for the social impact project "An ode to Ganges"

His paintings, drawings and digital works have featured in the following exhibitions: "Heroes and Villains: the Battle for Good in India's Comics" at the Los Angeles County Museum of Art (LACMA);, "Transcendent Deities of India: The Everyday Occurrence of the Divine" at the Asia Society in Houston, Texas; at the ghats of Varanasi, India; a social impact project organized by Ojas Art Foundation, other exhibitions include "Dhyana Roopa" at the Academy of Fine Arts and Literature in Delhi, "India Imagined" sponsored by the Nirula Family Art Trust and at the visionary Fractal Gallery at Burning Man sponsored by the Black Rock Arts Foundation.

Singh made a virtual reality film for Deepak Chopra. The film explores VR as a therapeutic platform of the future where conventional medicine can be substituted with immersive experiences.

Singh has also designed and developed animation properties for Cartoon Network, Hong Kong and India. He served as an art director on UTV's Arjun: The Warrior Prince for a brief time. He was invited to design a small sequence for Juanjo Guarnido's "Freak Kitchen" animated video and has served as concept artist on several unannounced live-action and animated projects.
