= Mekanix =

Comic titles by Marvel

- Cover art for Mekanix #5; Art by Celia Calle.

Publication information
- Publisher: Marvel Comics
- Format: Limited series
- Publication date: Dec 2002 - May 2003
- No. of issues: 6
- Main character(s): Kitty Pryde; Xuân Cao Mạnh

Creative team
- Written by: Chris Claremont
- Artist(s): Juan Bobillo and Marcelo Sosa
- Colorist: Edgar Tadeo

Mekanix is a six-issue comic book limited series published in 2002-2003 by Marvel Comics, written by Chris Claremont, pencilled by Juan Bobillo and inked by Marcelo Sosa.

== Plot ==
Once the youngest member of the X-Men, Kitty Pryde has made the decision to leave her former super hero life. She enrolls in the University of Chicago and tries to lead a normal life. However, bigotry and hatred against mutants continues to haunt her, threatening new and old friends alike. The anti-mutant group Purity sabotages an experiment Kitty is participating in, causing her and two other mutants, Xuân Cao Mạnh (Karma) and Genoshan exchange student Shola Inkosi, to reveal their mutant powers to save their fellow students.

The three are investigated by the FBI under the suspicion of terrorism and generally harassed by the mutant-hating population. The student Alice Tremaine, the mastermind behind Purity, even goes as far as trying to get them banned from campus. While the student council meeting ensues, they are attacked by a group of rogue Sentinels. They give it their all and successfully defeat them.
