= Dimdim =

Software company

Dimdim, Inc.
- Type: Acquired by Salesforce.com
- Industry: Software
- Founded: 2006; 20 years ago
- Defunct: 2011; 15 years ago
- Fate: Acquired
- Successor: Salesforce.com
- Headquarters: Boston, Massachusetts, U.S.
- Key people: DD Ganguly (CEO); Prakash Khot (CTO); Steve Chazin (CMO); Saurav Mohapatra (Director of Technology); Rohit Shankar (Director of Engineering); Sundar Subramanian (Director of Business Development); Uday Khatua (Director of Operations)
- Products: Web conferencing and collaboration
- Website: www.dimdim.com

Dimdim was a software company that provided a web-based platform for realtime collaboration and meetings. Dimdim provided web conferencing service where users could share desktops, show slides, collaborate, chat, talk, and broadcast via webcam. It was compared to the WebEx 2.0 web conferencing application. Dimdim was acquired by Salesforce.com for $31 million on January 6, 2011.

== Investors ==
Dimdim was financially backed by Index Ventures, Nexus India Capital and Draper Richards.

== Open source ==
Dimdim was made available primarily as an enterprise edition and as a Virtual Machine appliance, but an open source community edition has also been made available to developers under the GNU General Public License (GPL), giving them the option to install and host Dimdim in their own networks. The most recent open source version, released in December 2008 and hosted at sourceforge.net, is V4.5 "Liberty". However, no installation instructions were provided, and the software had several arbitrary limitations, leading some to describe it as "crippled". Distributions of the system for the installation to several OSes, Virtual Machines and the corresponding documentation are available in several archives on the SourceForge.net Dimdim site.

Dimdim can be integrated with the e-learning platforms Moodle, Claroline and Docebo, the collaborative suite Zimbra and the CRM software SugarCRM. Unlike Dimdim's web-hosted services, the Dimdim open source server does not restrict the number of attendees or simultaneous meetings allowed.

As of December 2010, at Dimdim's website, there was no download available for the open source version and the only way to download it was from SourceForge.net. Dimdim's acquisition FAQ states that the company would no longer be contributing to the open source project. As of January 2011, an open source fork called miDmiD had been started.

== History ==
An alpha version of Dimdim was released in fall 2006, followed by a private beta launch in fall 2007. The company's first public beta was in April 2008. Version 4.0 beta was released in July 2008. Dimdim formally exited beta in December 2008 with the launch of version 4.5. Fall 2008, Starin Marketing, Inc., an American company that supplies products to the audio visual market connected with Sundar Subramanian and worked to develop an on-site turnkey solution that provided multi-user collaboration combining Dimdim software with products Starin offered.

The most recent upgrade of Dimdim 5.5 was received with much criticism and numerous complaints of it being an alpha product. Various major changes took place in the interface of the system and its integration API with other systems.

== Acquisition ==
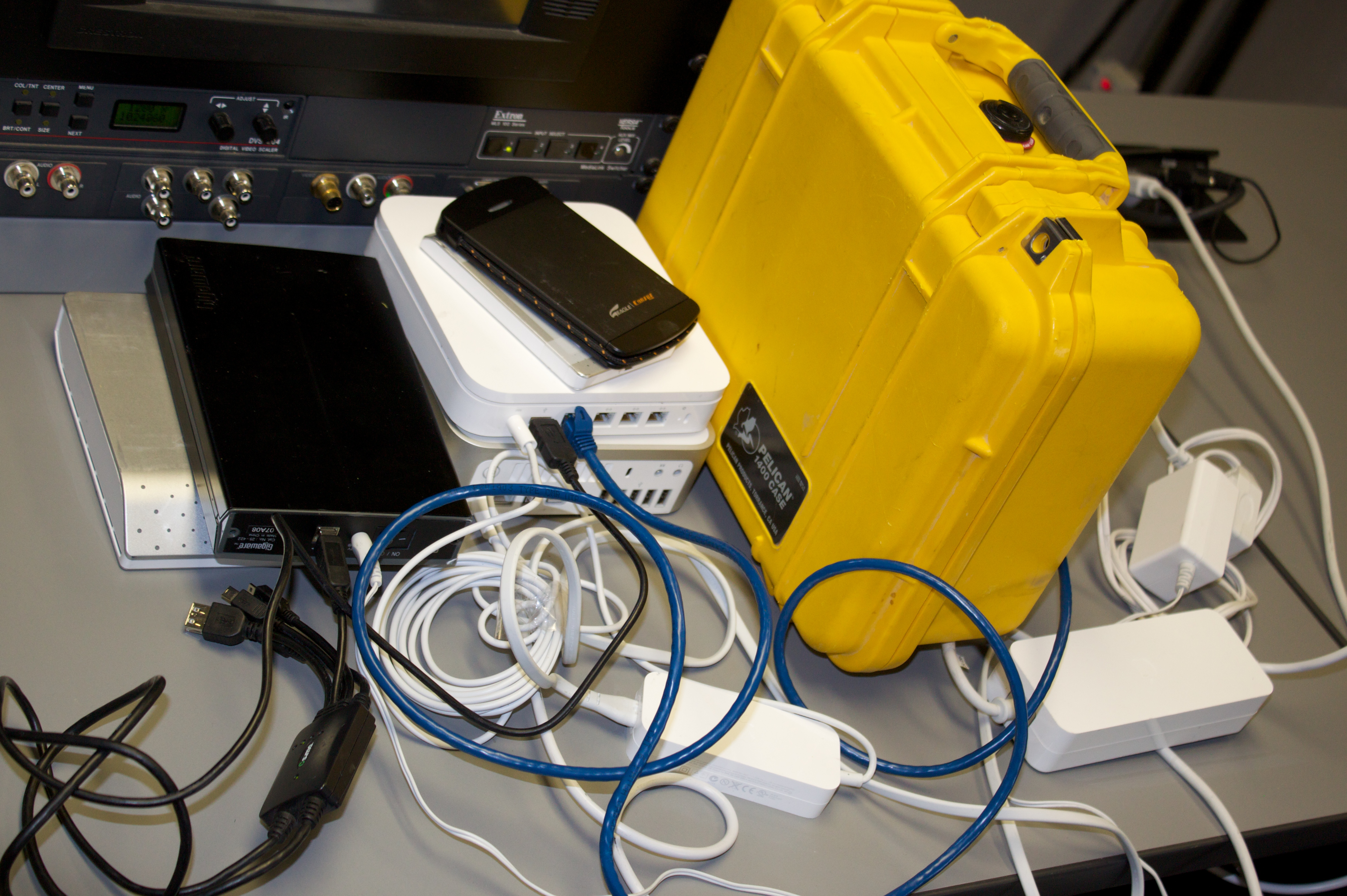
Portable 'Internet In A Box', which includes a router and a Mac Mini running DimDim, for web-based videoconferencing.

On January 6, 2011, Dim Dim was acquired by Salesforce.com for US$31 million.

== Revenue streams ==
As of 2010, Dimdim provided for hosted meetings, similar to GoToMeeting. Free meetings were made available for up to ten users. Professional meetings with collaboration tools for up to 50 users were also made available for US$25 per month, and webinar hosting for up to 100 users or 1,000 event attendees was available for US$75 per month.

== See also ==
- Collaborative software
- Comparison of web conferencing software
- Web conferencing
