= Snake Woman (comics) =

Snake Woman #1 Art by Michael Gaydos

Snake Woman is a comic series created by Shekhar Kapur and published by Virgin Comics (now Liquid Comics) for their Director's Cut line. Snake Woman was created by Shekhar Kapur, written by Zeb Wells, with art by Michael Gaydos and covers by Jeevan Kang. There are 10 issues in the series.

== Plot summary ==
The narrative of Snake Woman centers on Jessica Peterson, a contemplative young woman from the Midwest who relocates to Los Angeles. She finds employment as a waitress in a downtown LA bar. The plot takes a significant turn one night when Jessica is assaulted by a seemingly trustworthy yuppie patron at the bar. During this encounter, the attacker mentions an obscure entity known as 'The 68'. In the ensuing struggle, Jessica manages to defend herself and fatally injures the assailant, a moment that triggers a complex range of emotions in her.

Drawing inspiration from traditional Indian Naga legends, which depict the reincarnation of a serpent's soul in a human female, the story explores Jessica's gradual transformation. She begins to manifest reptilian traits and instincts, leading her on a path of vengeance to rectify an ancient injustice. This journey positions her within a larger, more mystical context than her individual existence.

A key theme of Snake Woman is the internal conflict experienced by Jessica. She grapples with the dichotomy between her human qualities, such as ethics, morality, and intellect, and the primal, instinctual characteristics of her emerging reptilian nature. As she uncovers the inherent power of her reptilian side, Jessica is confronted with the challenge of reconciling it with her human conscience and values.

== Characters ==
=== Jessica Peterson ===
The character of Jessica Peterson is portrayed as a quiet Midwesterner in her twenties who is torn between her intellect and her instinct. Her journey leads her to shed her skin and become more comfortable with her environment, which suddenly feels more alive.

=== Jin ===
Jess's roommate – a sexy, spunky, extroverted firecracker that's constantly pushing Jess to hook up with guys, “otherwise I will!”

== Collections ==
The series is being collected into trade paperbacks:

- A Snake in the Grass (collects #1–5, 144 pages, June 2007, ISBN 1-934413-01-1)

== See also ==
- Indian comics
