= The Unwaba Revelations =

Novel by Samit Basu

- Author: Samit Basu
- Language: English
- Genre: Fantasy
- Publisher: Penguin Books
- Publication date: 2007
- Publication place: India
- Media type: Print (paperback, hardback)
- Pages: 520
- ISBN: 0-14-310352-0

The Unwaba Revelations is a 2007 Indian fantasy novel written by Samit Basu. It is the third and final novel in the Game World trilogy after The Simoqin Prophecies (2004) and The Manticore's Secret (2005). The "Unwaba" is a chameleon, borrowed from a similar creature in the Zulu tradition, which acts as a narrator to the story. The novel was a critical and commercial success.

== Reception ==
Devangshu Datta of Outlook said that the novel "leans on both Tolkien and Pratchett in terms of format, while liberally borrowing from the Ramayana, John Brunner, George Lucas, Lovecraft et al." Parizaad Khan of Mint gave a positive response and called it a "delicious read". Ramya Sarma of Daily News and Analysis said, "Basu’s latest offering is worth reading, if only to find out how the ends left loose in the first two novels are tied up." A review carried by Hindustan Times wrote: "Epic battles between the gods and the bad guys (demons, in this case) scorch the pages of this 500-page-plus book."
