= The Simoqin Prophecies =

2004 novel by Samit Basu

- Cover to the first edition of The Simoqin Prophecies
- Author: Samit Basu
- Language: English
- Series: The Gameworld Trilogy
- Genre: Fantasy novel
- Publisher: Penguin Books, India
- Publication date: 15 January 2004
- Publication place: India
- Pages: 505 pp (paperback edition)
- ISBN: 978-0-14-303043-0
- OCLC: 61172755
- Followed by: The Manticore's Secret

The Simoqin Prophecies (2004, Penguin India) is a fantasy novel in English written by Indian author Samit Basu, and is the first novel in the GameWorld trilogy. It has also been published in Swedish, German and Spanish.

Other novels in the Gameworld Trilogy are The Manticore's Secret (2005) and The Unwaba Revelations (2007).

The Simoqin Prophecies contains a mix of Eastern and Western fantasy, featuring mythic creatures such as vanars, dragons, manticores, rakshases and various others.

The story revolves around two prophecies made before a great war two centuries before the events in the book take place, one foretelling the return of the great rakshas Danh-Gem, and the other revealing that a hero would also rise to challenge the reborn rakshas.

As the day of Danh-Gem's rising draws closer and the chosen hero is sent on a quest, another young man learns of terrible things he must do in secret and the difficult choices he must make in order to save the world from the rakshas.

== Plot summary ==
The story begins in the expected year of the rakshas Danh-Gem's return. Asvin, prince of Avranti is sent on an Aswamedh, a journey supposed to bring him fame and glory. But as soon as he reaches the forest, his guards turn on him and tell him that he would be executed at sunset. This is in accordance with the laws of a secret brotherhood, which ensured that all younger princes of Avranti who were too eager for glory would be dealt with this way. However he is rescued by the Silver Dagger and his men, on the orders of the Chief Civilian of Kol, who wanted him to be the prophecised hero.

In Kol, the Chief Civilian is very worried about the sudden emergence of the danavs of Imokoi along with their city asur cousins. Also the skuans under their lord Bjorkun are planning something. Manticores have been seen in the forest. It is later revealed that this is a plot to bring back Danh Gem, instigated by Bjorkun and Bali, later on joined by the asur king Leer, and Omar of Artaxerxeia. This group is called the secret Brotherhood of Renewal, dedicated to bring Danh-Gem back.

The spellbinders notice that magical levels all over the world are rising. Maya, a powerful spellbinder discovers that her best friend Kirin is in fact a ravian. Kirin himself had discovered this fact only a short while back and remembers that he is actually over two hundred years old. He recalls his memories back from his earlier days when he lived in the forest with a roving band of ravian warriors. Then he remembers the day the ravians had departed from the world. Somehow he was turned into stone at that time and didn't remember anything until Spikes, a pashan unlike any other, caused him to wake up. This is a great mystery which Maya is determined to solve.

Bali is convinced that the pashans are the key to Danh-Gem's return after learning about the secret of pashan birth from the storks. He tries to steal books called Untranslatables from the library of Enki, as they were written by Danh-Gem and are sure to have information on how to bring the rakshas back. He succeeds, and nearly kidnaps Maya as well, but Maya escapes by setting fire to his tail. Snow trolls under the orders of Bjorkun try to abduct the pashan Yarni, but they fail. Many including the vanar lord Bali, are looking for Spikes.

The Chief Civilian sends Asvin to study with Mantric, best of the Koli spellbinders, who was now on a vacation on the island of Bolvudis. He is accompanied by Maya, Kirin, Spikes, the Dagger (under the name of Amloki), a centauress Red Pearl, and a vaman Gaam. During this journey they are attacked by a nundu. They also meet Sir Cyr who seemed to be a harmless knight of Ventelot.

Kirin discovers a book in the library of Kol which is full of magic and purported to be written by Narak. This book speaks to him and reveals that his task was to slay Danh Gem when he rises again, but until then, he would have to work with the followers of Danh-Gem. The book convinces him to leave the others as he will bring danger to them. Kirin leaves with Spikes. Red pearl follows him. Bali catches up with Kirin while on the trail with Spikes. During the confrontation, Bali kills Red Pearl from behind. Kirin is furious but remembers what the book said remains silent. He thus joins the Brotherhood of Renewal feigning to be a Karisman. Kirin translates the Untranslatables that Bali had stolen earlier. It mentions five objects to be brought together for Danh-Gem's return. Kirin steals the Tear of heaven from Avranti and the Gauntlet of Tatsu.

Asvin goes on a series of quests, earning renown as well as many magical objects. The two most remarkable were his visit to the rakshasi Akarat, which earned him the ring of Akarat and the sword of Raka, and his journey through the pyramid of Elaken to get the armour of the scorpion man.

On the day of Danh Gem's arising, the brotherhood meets in the circle of Imokoi and lays down the five things needed. All but Kirin are turned to stone. Danh Gem materializes as a ghost like form Kirin tries to kill him but cannot as he is not in material form. Danh Gem reveals to him, in style reminiscent of star wars, that he is actually Kirin's father.

Kirin understands he is being offered a choice, between becoming a dark lord and trying to put things right in this world, or to let the brotherhood create havoc by starting the war. Kirin chooses the former as he decides the latter is too heroic. He ascends to the throne as Dark Lord.
