= Raksha (Vedic) =

Sanskrit term associated with protection

Raksha (Sanskrit: रक्षा, IAST: rakṣā, rakshas, rakshah) is a Sanskrit word associated with protection. Raksha and its various derivatives which occur predominantly in the Vedas and auxiliary texts means – to protect, guard, take care of, tend, rule, govern, to keep, not to divulge, to preserve, save, keep away from, spare, to avoid, to observe or to beware of, an evil spirit, a demon, an imp and is the root of numerous words. In the Vedas it refers to the evil tendencies that continuously afflict humanity.

Raksha is also a feminine name that is often given to girls in families that value protection and security. It is associated with the Hindu goddess Durga, who is the protector of the universe.

== Literature ==
In Sukta 53 of the VII Mandala of the Rig Veda in the 4th and 5th mantra addressed to Surya (Sun) beginning-

अदा॑भ्यो॒ भुव॑नानि प्र॒चाक॑शद्व्र॒तानि॑ दे॒वः स॑वि॒ताभि र॑क्षते प्रास्रा॑ग्बा॒हू भुव॑नस्य प्र॒जाभ्यो॑ धृ॒तव्र॑तो म॒हो अज्म॑स्य राजति.

त्रिर॒न्तरि॑क्षं सवि॒ता म॑हित्व॒ना त्री रजां॑सि परि॒भूस्त्रीणि॑ रोच॒ना ति॒स्रो दिवः॑ पृथि॒वीस्ति॒स्र इ॑न्वति त्रि॒भिर्व्र॒तैर॒भि नो॑ रक्षति॒ त्मना॑.

The god of the suns protects the worlds from the sun. Prasragbahu bhuvanasya prajabhyo dhritavrata maho ajmasya rajati.

The sun is the greatness of the three spaces, the three dusts, the three lights. The three heavens and the earth protect us with three vows

Rishi Vasishthahmaitravaruni refers to the Rakshas (रक्षस्) as groups of evil tendencies (vritti), having base animal qualities stemming from the rajas and tamas (gunas), modes of being: viz. 1) ulookavritti, owl tendency, attachment, 2) shushlookavritti, wolf tendency, anger, 3) shvavritti, dog tendency, envy, 4) kokavritti, goose tendency, lustfulness, 5) suparnavritti, kite tendency, ego, and 6) grddhavritti, vulture tendency, greediness.

Raksha, the demon, is a fictional character in Rudyard Kipling's The Jungle Book. She is the female leader of the wolf pack who adopts Mowgli.
