= The Manticore's Secret =

2005 novel by Samit Basu

- Cover to the first edition of The Manticore's Secret
- Author: Samit Basu
- Language: English
- Series: The Gameworld Trilogy
- Genre: Fantasy novel
- Publisher: Penguin Books
- Publication date: 2005
- Publication place: India
- Pages: 536 pp (paperback edition)
- ISBN: 0-14-400067-9
- Preceded by: The Simoqin Prophecies
- Followed by: The Unwaba Revelations

The Manticore's Secret (2005) is the second novel in Indian fantasy author Samit Basu's GameWorld trilogy.

== Characters ==
- Myrdak, of the house of Aegos, a ravian warrior.
- Peori, of the house of Hanash, a ravian warrior, wise and strong, a scholar as well as a warrior.
- Behrim, veteran of the great war was assigned the task of slaying Danh Gem reborn, destroying the rakshas lords and thus restoring the honour of the ravians.

== Plot summary ==
The book begins initially by showing the return of the ravians to the world, which they now call Obiyalis. The vamans loyal to the ravians (called the rebel union of marginal labour) and Manticore open the ravian portal to this world. Three champions of the ravians, Myrdak, Peori and Behrim, promptly kill the vamans so as to make sure there are no traitors to inform the world of the return of the ravians.

Meanwhile in the newly constructed dark tower of Izakar, Kirin is facing trouble. Most of his council of rakshases are issuing mad orders in his name, while all he wanted was to stop the war. Aciram warns Kirin of the return of the ravians and their plan to take over the earth. It seems that they are more dangerous to the humans now than to the dark lord. Nasud, a cousin of Kirin, grows tired of Kirin's peace efforts and declares a kin strife. Kirin kills him with a lightning bolt.

Meanwhile in Kol, a secret society of the shapeshifters, called the Rainbow Council, prepare to battle against the mind-controlling foes who threaten history. Many Hero and villain guilds are formed in Kol in the wake of Kirin's ascension as dark lord. Arathognan (or Thog the barbarian) was one of these. In one of these encounters, Thog kills four jaykinis who were trying to eat children. However he notices that he is being followed by a mysterious girl, later revealed to be Peori.

Asvin and Maya have fallen in love. Maya is now having doubts about Kirin, who was her former best friend. Asvin, however is eager to battle the hordes of the dark lord and still believes the ravians to be noble heroes who would save humanity.

Red, the shapeshifter, is part of the rainbow council. She had named two voices in her head and was never able to make up her mind about anything. It is also revealed here that the heart of Kol and the seven Hero mirrors where actually created by the shapeshifters although earlier they had been credited to lord Simoqin.

The ravians Myrdak and Peori attack the palace of Kol one night with the intention of kidnapping Maya and using her to get rid of Kirin. They encounter the Silver Dagger and battle with the shapeshifters but finally manage to escape with Maya. Asvin and Red (in the guise of Rukmini) follow her to the great forest of Vrihataranya. Red falls in love with Asvin on the way (although this may be because of the alter ego Rukmini she had named in her mind).

In the meanwhile Behrim, whose task had been to assassinate the dark lord is shocked to learn that the dark lord is in fact Kirin. In an attempt to talk to Kirin, he is detected by the rakshases but barely managed to escape. However he is then caught by the werewolves who nearly kill him. He is healed within the dark tower, where he tells Kirin that it is his destiny to become a great leader of the ravians.

Peori visits Ararthogorn and reveals to him that he is a descendant of the kings of Kol. She points out that he had the amulet that proved it so. She told him of the existence of a third Simoqin prophecy, that when the dark lord rose, the true king of Kol would return and with his hands strike down the evil powers which ruled Kol. She convinces him to assassinate Lady Temat. Thog tries to infiltrate the labyrinth but is easily caught.

Meanwhile, Maya has managed to escape from Myrdak and is lost in the forest. She comes across some little fat men, whom she initially suspected to be dangerous but turned out to be harmless. They arrive at the temple of the black Star, where Myrdak recaptures her.

Myrdak challenges dark lord Kirin to a duel, knowing he would come to rescue the girl he loved.

Kirin seeks the advice of Behrim, who states flatly that he could not be defeated in an open duel as he was the greatest ravian warrior alive. Behrim rather suggests that they go to Asroye and seek help from the ravian council. Kirin agrees to this and leaves on a dragon along with Behrim, ignoring pleas by Aciram. As soon as Kirin leaves, Aciram, who probably aspired for the throne of Danh-Gem himself, takes on Kirin's face.

Rakshases in the forest attack Myrdak and Maya manages to escape from the manticore. She takes shelter in Vanarpuri but Myrdak finds her. She escapes again with the help of Djongli and arrives at a peculiar place guarded by knights of Ventelot, called the Desolate Gard. Myrdak finally catches up with Maya and tells her that it was a ravian portal, and the nundu would give its blood to activate it. Maya then meets the unwaba, who tells her about the gods playing with this world. Myrdak leaves for his duel with Kirin.

Kirin and Behrim arrive at the ravian outpost of Epsai, only to find it deserted. Behrim realizes that Myrdak and Peori are traitors to the council and the ravians had not yet returned in their numbers. Both of them feel very tired and want to play with some apparently harmless little fat men. However these creatures turn out to be monsters, who eat only ravian. Behrim is devoured by them but Kirin is saved by Qianzai, mother of dragons. It is revealed that these creatures are these world's response to the arrival of the ravians. He then goes along to the duel.

Meanwhile in Kol, Peori has successfully infiltrated the labyrinth but runs into some minotaurs. She underestimates them and one of them gashes her. The Dagger appears and tells her they have some scores to settle. Peori raises the splintered glass to kill the dagger but Steel-bunz, who was small enough not to figure as dangerous nipped her from behind. This momentary distraction enabled the Dagger to throw his dagger and kill her.

Asvin is guided by a firebird to the temple of the black star. Red keeps a watch on him. when he is attacked by the manticore, she changes it into a frog.

Kirin's duel with Myrdak, which lasted for many hours resulted in Myrdak getting the upper hand, even though Kirin was armed with his shadowknife and his rakshas powers. After some time Asvin appears. He initially decides to fight against Kirin as he was the son of Danh Gem, however he realized that Myrdak was only interested in getting his armor and turned upon him. Myrdak whirled his sword in a blur and cut off his head. The duel continued.

Myrdak then pushes Kirin into a state of trance duel, in which Kirin had no experience at all. He wins the trance duel, but as he emerges back into the real world intending to strike Kirin down, the shapeshifter Red kills him with his own sword.

== Theme elements ==
The book is similar to its prequel and the first book of the series in terms of the writing style and the thematic exploration undertaken. The emerging theme elements include the distinction between good and evil, the subjectivity of history and the animosity between races, to name a few. There are many cultural references, which range from those to The Beatles, to Star Wars to those to traditional games played by kids in Bengal. The universe created by the author encompasses elements from Indian mythology with those from other mythologies. The resulting setting and the characters add to the element of humor in the series.
