= Walk-In (comics) =

Comic book series

Dave Stewart's Walk-In #1 Cover by Celia Calle Art by Ashish Padlekar

Walk-In is a comic book series, published starting in 2006, created by musician David A. Stewart, Jeff Parker, and Ashish Padlekar. The series is part of Virgin Comics' "Virgin Voices" line, the purpose of which is to let artists from other mediums create comics.

== Plot summary ==
Ian Dormouse is a vagabond who lives off free food from bars. He accidentally ends up doing a hokey stage show where he tells a dream, and coincidentally, the dream ends up being one from an audience member. Two strippers let him live with them in a hostel, and with a steady job whereupon he tells people about their dreams, he manages to obtain some money.

One day, Ian wakes up to witness a futuristic version of reality. It is then revealed that Ian Dormouse was a shifty vagrant who sleepwalked through life but he has since converted to become the Dream King, the most enigmatic mystic in Moscow's underground Burlesque scene. Furthermore, strange and evil men begin to follow him while he attempts to escape them.

== See also ==
- Indian comics
