= Spider-Man: India =

Superhero comic book series

Publication information
- Publisher: Marvel Comics
- Schedule: Yearly
- Format: Limited series
- Publication date: November 2004 – February 2005
- No. of issues: 4
- Main character: Spider-Man (Pavitr Prabhakar)

Creative team
- Written by: Sharad Devarajan; Jeevan Kang; Suresh Seetharaman
- Artist: Jeevan Kang
- Letterer: Dave Sharpe
- Colorist: Gotham Studios Asia
- Editor(s): John Barber; Nick Lowe; Ralph Macchio

Collected editions
- Spider-Man: India: ISBN 0-7851-1640-0

Spider-Man: India is a superhero comic book series published in India by Gotham Entertainment Group in 2004, retelling the story of Marvel Comics' Spider-Man in an Indian setting. It ran for four issues, which were later also published in the United States in 2005 and collected into a trade paperback (ISBN 0-7851-1640-0). The series was created by Sharad Devarajan, Suresh Seetharaman, and Jeevan J. Kang with Marvel Comics.

The titular character of Pavitr Prabhakar / Spider-Man made his cinematic debut in the 2023 feature film Spider-Man: Across the Spider-Verse voiced by Karan Soni, depicted as a member of Miguel O'Hara's Spider-Society.

== Plot summary ==
Pavitr Prabhakar, a simple Indian boy from a remote village, moves to Mumbai with his Aunt Maya and Uncle Bhim to study after getting half a scholarship. His parents died a couple of years ago. Other students at his new school tease him and hit him for his studious nature and village background. He knows his Uncle Bhim is struggling to support him and his aunt Maya, and pay his school fees. Only Meera Jain, a popular girl from his school, befriends him. Meanwhile, a local crime lord named Nalin Oberoi uses an amulet to perform an ancient ritual in which he is possessed by a demon committed to opening a gate for other demons to invade Earth. While being chased by bullies, Pavitr encounters an ancient yogi who grants him the powers of a spider, in order to fight the evil that threatens the world. While discovering his powers, Pavitr refuses to help a woman being attacked by several men. He leaves the place, but comes back when he hears his uncle cry out, and discovers that he has been killed. He learns that Bhim was stabbed when he tried to help the woman. Pavitr understands that with great power comes great responsibility, and promises to use his powers for the good of others.

Nalin Oberoi briefly becomes human again and transforms a mild-mannered doctor into a demon with four magical tentacles (the Indian version of Doctor Octopus), and sends him to kill Spider-Man, as instructed by the demon voices. Doc Ock fails, and Spider-Man makes his public debut as a hero. He is, however, labeled a threat by the newspapers.

Oberoi kidnaps Pavitr Prabhakar's aunt, taking her to a refinery outside Mumbai. There he betrays Doctor Octopus, blasting him into the ocean with a ray. Spider-Man arrives and fights Oberoi, who has also kidnapped Meera. He drops both Maya and Meera from the top of the refinery. Spider-Man dives for his aunt, but fails to rescue Meera, who is saved by Doctor Octopus. Pavitr reveals his identity to Meera and asks her to take his aunt to safety.

Oberoi gets rid of Doctor Octopus for good and touches Spider-Man with the amulet. A Venom-like creature emerges from the amulet and tries to lure Spider-Man to the dark side. Pavitr remembers his uncle's saying about responsibility and rejects the evil. By doing so, the link between the demons and Oberoi is shattered, and he becomes human again. Spider-Man throws the amulet into the ocean, and Oberoi is sent to a mental institution.

Peace is restored to Mumbai eventually. Pavitr Prabhakar begins a romance with Meera, and is shown celebrating the festival Diwali with his aunt. The story ends with a quote from the Bhagavad Gita, showing the Venom-Demon still alive.

== Parallels with Western Spider-Man ==
Spider-Man's alter ego in the comic is named Pavitr Prabhakar, a phonetic distortion of Peter Parker. There are a number of other parallels with the original comic book characters:

- Meera Jain – Analogous to Mary Jane Watson.
- Auntie Maya – Analogous to Aunt May.
- Uncle Bhim – Analogous to Uncle Ben.
- Hari Oberoi – Analogous to Harry Osborn.
- Nalin Oberoi – Analogous to Norman Osborn, a local crime boss, and father of Hari Oberoi. He transforms into a demon reminiscent of the Ultimate Marvel version of the Green Goblin.
- Aadi – Analogous to Eddie Brock/Venom.
- Doctor – A mild-mannered doctor whom Nalin Oberoi transforms into a demon with four magical tentacles.

== Later comic appearances ==
During the Spider-Verse storyline, which features Spider-Men from various alternate realities, Pavitr Prabhakar is seen fighting a mysterious new villain named Karn, who he mistakes for a demon. The Superior Spider-Man (Doctor Octopus' mind in Peter Parker's body) manages to save Pavitr and recruits him into his army of Spiders. In the second volume of Spider-Verse, set during the Secret Wars event, Pavitr finds himself in the Battleworld domain Arachnia, where he teams up with Spider-Gwen, Spider-Ham, Spider-Man Noir, Spider-UK, and Anya Corazon. However, none of them remember their previous encounter during the original Spider-Verse.

Following the conclusion of Secret Wars the team of six Spiders that formed during the event is renamed and featured in an ongoing series called Web Warriors, a name coined by Peter Parker from the Ultimate Spider-Man TV series during the original Spider-Verse.

== In other media ==
- Pavitr Prabhakar / Spider-Man appears in Spider-Man: Across the Spider-Verse, voiced by Karan Soni. Additionally, analogues of Gwen Stacy and Captain George Stacy named Gayatri Singh and Inspector Singh make minor appearances.
- Pavitr Prabhakar / Spider-Man appears as a playable character in Spider-Man Unlimited.
- Spider-Man (Pavitr Prabhakar) appears as a playable character in Marvel Contest of Champions.
