= Rakkhosh =

Rakkhosh may refer to:

- Bilu Rakkhosh (2017 film), an Indian Bengali-language film directed by Indrasis Acharya
- Rakkhosh (2019 film), an Indian Bengali-language film directed by Abhijit Kokate and Srivinay Salian
- Rakkhosh (2026 film), a Bangladeshi film directed by Mehedi Hassan Hridoy
