= Ramayan 3392 A.D. =

2006-07 American comic series

- The first cover of Ramayan 3392 A.D. by Alex Ross

Publication information
- Publisher: Virgin Comics
- Schedule: Monthly
- Format: Ongoing series
- Publication date: September 2006 - April 2007; August 2007 - (Reloaded)
- No. of issues: 8; 8 (as of August 2008) (Reloaded)

Creative team
- Created by: Deepak Chopra; Shekhar Kapur
- Written by: Shamik Dasgupta, Abhishek Singh
- Artist(s): Abhishek Singh; Jeevan Kang (Reloaded)
- Letterer: Ravikiran B.S.
- Colorist: Ashwin Chikerur
- Editor(s): MacKenzie Cadenhead; Gotham Chopra; Mahesh Kamath; Ron Marz (Reloaded)

Collected editions
- Volume 1: ISBN 1-934413-04-6
- Volume 2: ISBN 1934413127
- Volume 3: ISBN 1934413313

Ramayan 3392 A.D. (formerly called Ramayan Reborn) is a comic book series published by Virgin Comics based upon the Ramayana. It is written by Shamik Dasgupta, the art is by Abhishek Singh, and it is a brainchild of Deepak Chopra and Shekhar Kapur. It features a re-imagining of the historical classic in a post-apocalyptic future.

The story primarily deals with the last kingdom of humans who are fighting demons (Asuras) to survive. The series' prime protagonist is the human prince Rama who, alongside his brothers, aims to bring down the demon-lord Ravan.

== Plot summary ==
In the third age of mankind, the world, after a nuclear third world war, is divided into two continents, Nark and Aryavarta. In Aryavarta the last kingdom of humans exists inside a city called Armagarh.

The city is ruled by a council, the leader of which is a man by the name of Dashrath. His four sons, Rama, Lakshman, Shatrughan and Bharat are sent by the council to outposts of the kingdom to provide assistance. Rama and Lakshman go to the docile region of Fort Janasthan while Bharat and Shatrughan are dispatched to war-torn Khundgiri.

At Fort Janasthan, Rama and Lakshman are surprised to find a heavy regiment of Asuras attacking the fort. After sustaining heavy losses and injury to Lakshman, Rama barters with the enemy and surrenders so as to allow the Janasthanians safe passage while the Asuras destroy the Fort. This act angers the council who then plead with the gods that then subsequently punish Rama by banishing him into exile.

After Rama is exiled, the kingdom of Armagarh falls into disarray. Dashrath succumbs to his death while Lakshman finds himself having to deal with assassination attempts from rogue elements within the council that are aiming to cause an insurrection within the kingdom. In order to obtain support, he goes to Khundgiri to try and meet his brothers but on the way, he meets an old seer by the name of Vishwamitra who instead takes him to Rama. The seer, one of an exalted group of seven, convinces Rama (after showing him the vision of a devastated future) to follow him on a quest to a mythical city called Mithila.

Upon reaching the forests of Dandakaranya (a place near Janasthan), they are then told by an owl that the horde of Asuras that had destroyed Fort Janasthan had been busy fighting and slaughtering all the beasts of the region in the past few months. The Asuras, however, had also suffered equal losses and only a handful amongst them had survived. Rama and his fellow travelers then sprint towards Mithila in order to prevent further destruction.

At Mithila, they subdue the last remnants of the dispatched Asura force thus saving the princess of the region, a woman by the name of Seeta who is gifted with magical powers of nature. Vishwamitra states that it is to be Rama's role to act as a protector to this woman, a role that he refuses to take up. They are then attacked by three Asura warriors (who are actually three of Ravan's children). In the battle, the three warriors are killed thus earning the humans the ire of Ravan himself who then arrives to destroy Mithila. Rama, Lakshman and Seeta flee through a secret route while the king of the region, Janak, prepares to fight Ravan.

On the other hand, a small faction of Armagarhian rebels led by the former prime minister Sumantra, aims to bring down the conspiracy revolving around the House of Suryavansha (Rama's clan). The sons of Dashrath are being eliminated one by one, systematically. Rama is exiled, Lakshman on the run, and Bharat lost in the battles of Khundgiri. They find out the prime culprit Kalnemi, an Asura who is disguised as a councilor in Armagarh. Bharat is held in captivity deep below in the mines of Khundgiri. Sumantra, with his daughter and Shatrughan, release Bharat from his prison, and they all go to Armagarh to bring down Kalnemi and his cohorts. Kalnemi is killed by Bharat and the valiant prince assumes the role of the first King of Armagarh, dissolving the corrupt council. Bharat vows that he will bring back Rama and crown him as the true king of Armagarh, until then he will rule over the great country.

=== Ramayan 3392 AD reloaded ===
The series is being rehashed after the first arc consisting of eight issues. Now a new beginning starts with writer Shamik Dasgupta and artist Jeevan Kang with the guidance of celebrated writer/editor Ron Marz. The story continues after Rama, Lakshman and Seeta escape from Mithila and are teleported to the wastelands of the far north. Rama suffers from severe wounds and is at death's door. This new chapter will soon be collected in a trade paperback called 'Ramayan 3392 AD Reloaded: Tome of the Wastelands'.

== Characters ==
Note: The characters' names were taken from original Ramayan (to whom the links go), but the description and information about them is created by the story maker.

- Dashrath - Chief Councillor of the land of Armagarh. He is the father of the brothers Rama, Lakshman, Bharat and Shatrughan.
- Rama - Dashrath's eldest son and protagonist of the series. He is blue-skinned and according to Vishvamitra, is linked to a Loka, a different realm of existence, of which he is a Master.
- Ravan - The leader of the continent of Nark and a product of nanotechnology, Ravan was created by one of the seven nations of the world during the 'pre-Mahavinash' period, in an attempt to obtain an edge over the other six nations during the world war that consumed the planet.
- Lakshman - Dashrath's third son and Rama's travelling companion, Lakshman is described as strong-willed and warrior-minded as well as rash and thoughtless.
- Bharat - Dashrath's second son, Bharat was sent to the region of Khundgiri where he was manipulated by an Asura agent and captured. He later returns with the aid of others and declares himself the Sovereign King of Amragarh, until Rama's return.
- Shatrughan - Dashrath's fourth and last son, Shatrughan is described as physically weak but intellectually strong.
- Seeta - The adopted daughter of King Janak of Mithila and the daughter of the Earth, Seeta is endowed with magical properties that enable her to control and manipulate nature. Ravan wishes to capture her and use her powers in order to understand the various emotions felt by living beings, especially humans.
- Vishvamitra - One of the seven seers, the great ancient ones, who takes Rama, Lakshman and Guha to Mithila where he charges Rama with the task of protecting Seeta.
- Guha - A fisherman friend of Rama, Guha travels with him to Mithila where he meets his demise at the hands of an Asura.

== Themes ==
This adaptation of the ancient epic significantly changes the roles of many pivotal characters, which has been a tradition through ancient Indian literature. The spiritual themes of the ancient epic are in this case replaced by technological ones, often culminating in the same situations. This may reflect the classical Indian belief that the history of the universe repeats in cycles, eventually leading history to repeat itself in similar yet alien ways.

== Reception ==
Ramayan 3392 A. D. has met with mixed reviews from many sources, particularly for its original take on the epic, and artwork.

== Collected editions ==
The series has been collected as a trade paperback:

- Volume 1: The Mahavinaash Age (collects Ramayan 3392 A.D. #1-8, 196 pages, July 2007, ISBN 1-934413-04-6)
- Volume 2: Reloaded - Tome of the Wastelands (collects Ramayan 3392 A.D.: Reloaded #1-5, 144 pages, April 2008, ISBN 1-934413-12-7)
- Volume 3: Reloaded (144 pages, solicited for November 2008, ISBN 1-934413-31-3)

== Film ==
Mandalay Pictures will be working on a film version, with Mark Canton producing the adaptation.

== Video game ==
Jump Games, an Indian mobile video game developer also released an adaptation of the comic.

== See also ==
- Indian comics
