= Devi (Virgin Comics) =

Female Superhero Character

- Cover to issue #1 of Devi (July 2006). Art by Mukesh Singh.

Publication information
- Publisher: Virgin Comics
- Schedule: Monthly
- Format: Ongoing series
- Publication date: July 2006 - July 2008
- Main character(s): Tara Mehta

Creative team
- Written by: Siddharth Kotian, Samit Basu, Saurav Mohapatra
- Artist(s): Mukesh Singh, Aditya Chari, Saumin Patel

Devi is a fictional character created by Shekhar Kapur and Virgin Comics, as part of their debut Shakti line, which focuses on Indian settings. The character is loosely based upon the mythological figure Durga.

== Plot summary ==
Devi was a celestial warrior goddess created by the gods to fight the renegade god Bala in the 2nd century of man. When Bala rose again to threaten the universe, Devi was reborn within the body of a young woman named Tara Mehta.

The Devi entity had emerged within a warrior-woman of the Durapasya (human warriors of light) clan. She had led the armies of the gods and men on an all-out assault on Bala's Fortress.

After defeating Bala through hand-to-hand combat, which led to the fallen god being blinded, captured, and imprisoned by Bodha, the supreme Lord of creation inside Jwala, the fortress of fire and stone (hidden deep within the earth) she had created a source to hold the prayers of humanity and channel them to Akashik, the story's representation of heaven, thus replenishing the powers of the other pure gods.

The key to Bala's sarcophagus prison was entrusted to a creature of fire and stone called the Gatekeeper.

In the present, a woman by the name of Tara Mehta, who is the unawakened Devi incarnate, lives a posh lifestyle alongside her boyfriend Iyam (who was the former favorite general of Bala during the ancient battle, and currently Sitapur's most notorious ganglord). He also owns “the Abyss” night club.

An investigation by Inspector Rahul Singh, a functioning alcoholic of the Sitapur police who drinks alcohol in order to self-medicate an overactive supernatural ability, leads to pinpointing Iyam as a culprit. Meanwhile, Kratha, an Apsara - an assassin of heaven hired by Lord Bala using a woman named Amara Gaelle - goes to try to eliminate Tara Mehta before she becomes Devi. However, she is unsuccessful as the Durapasya kidnap and drug her before she can kill her target.

Tara comes into contact with the first Devi who attempts to lead Tara on the road to rebirth as the Devi. Inspector Rahul Singh follows Iyam to a private meeting with Amara where he learns of the supposed assassination attempt.

Iyam and Kratha come to a truce ending with Iyam paying Kratha double the amount of what she was paid by her previous master. Amara, Lord Bala's contact, kills 2 of Iyam's bodyguards who had captured Inspector Rahul thus freeing him and seemingly following her own agenda.

== Characters ==
- Devi - A supernatural entity created by the gods to defeat their enemy, Lord Bala.
- Lord Bala - An evil god bent on conquering heaven and subjugating man to his will. He feeds on the forced worship of his followers and he plans to stop the modern era version of the Devi and also to find the Source so as to gain its power.
- Tara Mehta - A woman from the city of Sitapura who is said to become the next incarnation of Devi.
- Rahul Singh - A cynical burnt out alcoholic police officer who, by a strange turn of events, finds himself as the sidekick of the current Devi incarnate, Tara Mehta.
- Kratha - An apsara assassin hired by Lord Bala to kill Tara Mehta.
- Agantuk - A priest of the order of the Durapasya who advocates the "radical" idea of keeping the human host alive for the Devi entity. He is largely responsible for Tara's survival when the Devi entity manifests itself within her mind and body.

== Reception ==
Critical response to Devi has generally been positive, especially towards the artwork, which has drawn almost unanimous praise. The first two issues drew some criticism for lack of world development and cliché dialogue, but reviewers found these issues were resolved in Devi #3. In terms of sales, Devi is the most popular comic of the Shakti line.

== Credits ==
Issues #1-#2 were written by Siddharth Kotain, with art and cover by Mukesh Singh, and colours by J Nanjan. Issues #3-#10 were written by Samit Basu. Issue #11 and all later issues are written by Saurav Mohapatra. Acclaimed creator Ron Marz has signed on as story consultant and editor for the series.

== Collections ==
The series is being collected as trade paperbacks:

- Volume 1 (collects #1-5, 144 pages, June 2007, ISBN 1934413003)
- Volume 2 (collects #6-10, 144 pages, October 2007, ISBN 1934413062)
- Volume 3 (collects #10-15, 144 pages, January 2008, ISBN 1934413119)
- Volume 4 (collects #16-20, 144 pages, July 2008, ISBN 1934413224)

== See also ==
- Indian comics
- Tara Mehta
- Bala
- Rahul Singh
- Iyam
- Kratha
