= Jeevan Kang =

Indian comic book artist and writer

- Areas: Writer, Artist

Jeevan J. Kang is an Indian comic book artist and writer.

== Work ==
He was responsible for the artwork and script of the comic Spider-Man: India, and was signed on by Virgin Comics to create art for their Indian comics. He is also the co creator of The Legend of Hanuman - an Indian animated Epic fantasy television series

== Publications ==
His comic work includes:

- The Sadhu (with Gotham Chopra, Virgin Comics, 2006)
- Seven Brothers (with Garth Ennis, based on a concept by John Woo, 5-issue mini-series, Virgin Comics, 2006)
- Ramayan 3392 AD (with Gotham Chopra, Virgin Comics, 2008)

== See also ==
- Indian comics
