= The Sadhu =

Cover art for Sadhu #01 Art by Jeevan Kang

The Sadhu is a comic book series based on the character of the same name. The Sadhu was created by Gotham Chopra and Jeevan Kang and the series is part of the Shakti line of comics published by Virgin Comics.

The plot revolves around a British soldier by the name of James Jensen who finds himself to be the reincarnated form of a powerful sage from the past. The story primarily deals with the lessons that he has to learn so as to remove his connection with his current life.

The comic book series is the first series from the Virgin line to have been confirmed for a film adaptation.

== Plot summary ==
Cover art for Sadhu #03 Art by Jeevan Kang

In India, the British Imperial army is fighting the natives and a group of Robin Hood-like bandits called the Dakaits. Allied to the British are the Zamindars, landowners that find it in their interest to have the British ruling over India. A sadhu by the name of Dada Thakur is directing the efforts of the Dakaits against the British and is told by a goddess that help is on the way for the Dakaits.

In England, a young man named James is working in the docks of London with his younger brother William. They are both unemployed and looking for work and have to fight other job-seekers to get a place on the ships. His brother gets a job on a certain ship and while James bids him farewell, he is approached by a soldier who offers him a chance to join the British Indian Army in India. James eventually agrees after finding that his wife, Tess, is pregnant.

A brutal colonel by the name of Timothy Townsend is the commanding officer in charge in India. Due to numerous mutinies erupting within the colony, he is requested to postpone his retirement. He works for the East India company in the vicinity of the Bengal province.

James arrives in India and one day accidentally stumbles upon a temple of Kali, the goddess of Death. There he finds a brief moment of spiritual epiphany and a feeling that his destiny is somehow intertwined with this foreign land. His wife also bears him a boy called Jack. James is trained within the army but he is found to be unfitting as a soldier and Colonel Townsend is particularly displeased with him. One night, while drunk, Townsend berates him and attempts to entice James' wife which forces James to publicly rebuke the colonel angering him in the process.

The next day, James is ordered by the colonel to shoot an Indian soldier who disobeyed orders. When James refuses, he is taken away and beaten up and to further exacerbate the situation, the Colonel brings in his wife and sexually assaults her. Within a short while, he kills her and James' son in front of him. James is buried alive but with the help of one of his fellow soldiers, he manages to flee the military unit. While escaping within the jungle, he finds a band of Indian killers whose leader, Dada Thakur, saves him by using manipulation of reality powers to shrink James to the size of an atom. The shaman, Dada Thakur, declares James to be "the one" and tells him that James was once his mentor.

Cover art for Sadhu #05 Art by Jeevan Kang

Colonel Townsend is reprimanded for the casualties suffered and in order to cover up, he lies by stating that an insane James was to blame as he killed his wife and child and allowed natives to enter the encampment. He is told by his superiors that India has officially become a colony of the British Empire and that the East India company wants him to firmly secure the region as it is a key producer of opium that is sold to China.

James wakes up and finds himself in a Bengali village. Dada Thakur says that he had once promised to help James "remember" himself, back when James was the Sadhu. Dada Thakur orders James to be attacked through sticks and bullets but James' unconscious mystical powers awaken and protect him. James becomes impressed when Dada Thakur heals a wounded boy and also when Dada Thakur repels a contingent of British soldiers by freezing their bullets in mid-air and by unleashing a wave of energy through a third eye on his forehead. He requests to be trained in the same arts and Dada accepts his request.

James begins his training with Dada Thakur who tells him that reality is ultimately a perception and hence through his mind, he can change what he perceives. Also, since he creates reality by perceiving it, Dada tells James that he is ultimately responsible for the deaths of his family and the deaths of anyone else. He learns how to obtain enhanced speed, phasing, advanced fighting capability, time manipulation and even absolute concentration. He is also told by Dada that one day he will betray the shaman. After three years, James ends his training abruptly as the desire to seek vengeance from Townsend grows beyond control within him.

James visits an English University where a professor, known for his knowledge of occult studies, is lecturing about Sadhus. After demonstrating that he can fly to the unbelieving professor, James asks the professor for information about a "demon Sadhu" that he believes to be present within the country.

James then goes to an inn and ignoring the advances of a prostitute, he goes to meet the owner who happens to be his brother, William. A bar fight ensues which is stopped when the owner of the entire establishment comes and kills a worker who was apparently stealing. He exits the place by simply vanishing and James pursues his trail. He catches up with the coach of this demon Sadhu and he finds that the person is none other than Colonel Townsend. James was aware of this and he challenges Townsend to a fight but because of his lack of experience, he finds himself easily beaten. His battered body is taken in by the English University professor whose daughter is also aware of James' powers and who subsequently nurses him.

The professor tells James that Townsend may have gone to a Kali temple and therein worshiped the destructive side of the goddess thus becoming a demon Sadhu. James takes his leave after being informed by the professor's daughter that Townsend has established a deep power base within the London underworld.

James meets his brother and tells him of Tess's death and Townsend's part in it but William refuses to take him to the Colonel for fear of being killed. James publicly demands Townsend to confront him and later that night evades an assassination attempt in his sleep. His brother comes to meet him to try and dissuade him from his goal but James refuses to listen to the advice and continues in his quest.

== Reception ==
The comic series has generally been well received with comparisons being made to Neil Gaiman's Sandman (another series focused on an individual character). The artwork has especially been praised for its surreal aspects. The use of Hindu history and mythology alongside many fantasy elements has been said to have brought out a fresh approach within the comic series.

== Continuation ==
The story of Sadhu continues with two 5 issue miniseries, sequel The Silent Ones, and third part The Wheel of Destiny.

== Characters ==
=== James Jensen ===
James Jensen is an Englishman who moved to India in order to work under the British army. However, after his family's murder, he meets an enigmatic mystic by the name of Dada Thakur who tells him that he was a sadhu before he was James Jenson. Finding that he possesses mystical powers, James decided to obtain vengeance and thus embarked on a quest to find his family's killer.

=== Colonel Timothy Townsend ===
Colonel Timothy Townsend is a brutal commander leading the British contingent in India. After murdering James' family, he prays to the dark side of the Indian goddess Kali thus becoming blessed with extreme powers. He becomes a demon Sadhu in the process and manages to become a dominant force within the London crime scene. It is stipulated that he is indirectly responsible for James' conversion to a Sadhu.

=== Dada Thakur ===
Dada Thakur is a shaman who leads a band of Dakaits against the British. However, he is also revealed to have been a pupil of James in the past (back when he was a sadhu) thus being a minor, but powerful, Sadhu. He takes it upon himself to train James and to also help him "remember" himself. Dada Thakur has also revealed of knowing that James will betray him in the future, a claim that James refuses.

=== Tess Jensen ===
Tess is James' wife who goes with him to India. She is pregnant with a boy called Jack and within months, she is pregnant with another baby. She is forcibly taken and almost raped by Colonel Timothy Townsend who subsequently kills her in front of James.

=== William Jensen ===
William is James' younger brother. He stays behind in London while his brother goes to the East. He eventually ends up running an inn under Colonel Townsend.

== Themes ==
The Sadhu is based on Eastern (Hindu) concepts such as karma, shakti (the female embodiment of the Goddess) and the four stages of living. It is revealed that the Sadhu is a force for good recruited by the goddess and that his entire life is a preparation for this conversion.

The idea of reality being a perception plays a dominant role as James constantly confesses to a feeling of familiarity when he should be a stranger to the foreign lands that he visits. Moreover, brief asides and notes at the ends of each issue (by Deepak Chopra) further demonstrate the spiritual nature of the story.

As explained in the four stages of living, the sadhu is the embodiment of the final stage of living where emotional attachment and worldly ties are abandoned. Thus, the death of James' family was a necessary component for James' conversion into the Sadhu.

The Sadhu is also said to be a "seeker" who goes through life trying to find the reason for his existence. In the comics, this is further backed up as even before reaching India, James Jenson felt that "India was already somehow already a part of me".

== Film adaptation ==
In late 2006, there were rumors of a film adaptation starring Nicolas Cage.

In early 2014, it was reported that a film adaption would be co-produced by Mark Canton of Atmosphere Entertainment with Sharad Devarajan and Gotham Chopra of Graphic India.

== Collections ==
The series is being collected as trade paperbacks:

- When Realities Collide (196 pages, July 2007, ISBN 1-934413-03-8)

== See also ==
- Indian comics
- The Silent Ones (miniseries)
