= Samit Basu =

Indian writer (born 1979)

- Born: 14 December 1979 (age 46); Kolkata, India
- Occupations: Novelist, film director
- Writing career
- Period: 2004–present
- Genres: Fantasy, science fiction, superhero, children's, rom-com
- Website: samitbasu.com

Samit Basu (born 14 December 1979) is an Indian novelist and filmmaker whose body of work includes science fiction, fantasy and superhero novels, children's books, graphic novels, short stories, and a Netflix film. His most recently published novel is The City Inside, an anti dystopian near future science fiction novel set in Delhi and published by Macmillan imprint Tordotcom. Its previous Indian edition Chosen Spirits, published 2020, was shortlisted for the JCB Prize for Literature.

He currently lives and works in Delhi and Mumbai, India.

== Biography ==
Born 14 December 1979 in a Bengali family, Basu grew up in Calcutta, where he studied at Don Bosco School, and later Presidency College, Kolkata, where he obtained a degree in economics. He dropped out of the Indian Institute of Management Ahmedabad to write The Simoqin Prophecies and then went on to complete a course in broadcasting and documentary film-making at the University of Westminster, London. His sister is Sayoni Basu, co-founder of Duckbill Books.

== Writing ==
Basu is the author of the GameWorld Trilogy, The Simoqin Prophecies, The Manticore's Secret and The Unwaba Revelations, a fantasy trilogy published by Penguin Books, India. He gained worldwide presence with the metahuman duology, Turbulence and its sequel Resistance, a superhero novel set in India, Pakistan and England, published by Titan Books. He is also the author of the Adventures of Stoob series of children's books set in Delhi, and Terror on the Titanic a YA novel. In 2020, Chosen Spirits was published by Simon and Schuster. The book is described as 'anti-dystopian'.

The UK publication of Turbulence in 2012 introduced Basu to the West. Wired said "Turbulence has it all… Solid writing, great character development, humor, personal loss, and excellent points to ponder in every chapter." It also won a Wired Geekdad Goldenbot Award and appeared at no.2 on the list of hot new Amazon Science Fiction titles on the week of its release. Since 2013, Basu has also written a series of children's books titled The Adventures of Stoob. Three books have been published so far in the series - Testing Times, A Difficult Stage and Mismatch Mayhem. All three have been illustrated by graphic artist Sunaina Coelho.

Basu is also a comics writer. His initial projects with Virgin Comics were as a writer for Shekhar Kapur's Devi (#3-#10) and The Tall Tales of Vishnu Sharma based on the Panchatantra. Basu also co-wrote Untouchable (comics), a graphic novel with X-Men and Lucifer writer Mike Carey and went on to write UnHoli, an episodic zombie comedy set in and around New Delhi. In 2013, Basu published Local Monsters, a comic/fantasy take about six immigrant monsters living in a house in Delhi, and contributed to 18 Days, a Grant Morrison take on the Mahabharata.

== Direction and Screenwriting ==
In April 2019, Netflix announced that Basu was a co-director and writer of House Arrest, one of their new International Originals series from India.

== Bibliography ==
Title	Series	Publisher	ISBN	Publishing date
The Simoqin Prophecies	The Gameworld Trilogy	Penguin Books India	ISBN 0-14-303043-4	2004
The Manticore's Secret	The Gameworld Trilogy	Penguin Books India	ISBN 0-14-400067-9	2005
The Unwaba Revelations	The Gameworld Trilogy	Penguin Books India	ISBN 0-14-310352-0	2007
Terror on the Titanic		Scholastic	ISBN 978-81-8477-460-3	2010
Turbulence	Turbulence	Titan Books	ISBN 978-1-78116-119-7	2012
Resistance	Turbulence	Titan Books	ISBN 1781162492	2013
Testing Times	The Adventures Of Stoob	Red Turtle	ISBN 8129132753	2014
A Difficult Stage	The Adventures Of Stoob	Red Turtle	ISBN 8129134985	2015
Mismatch Mayhem	The Adventures Of Stoob	Red Turtle	ISBN 8129135914	2016
Chosen Spirits		Simon & Schuster	ISBN 9386797828	2020
The City Inside		Tordotcom Publishing	ISBN 9781250827487	2022
The Jinn-Bot of Shantiport		Tordotcom Publishing	ISBN 9781250827517	2023
