= Seven Brothers (comics) =

2006 five-issue comic book limited series

Devi
- 7 Brothers #1 Art by Yoshitaka Amano

Publication information
- Publisher: Virgin Comics
- Schedule: Monthly
- Publication date: October 2006-
- No. of issues: 5

Creative team
- Created by: John Woo
- Written by: Garth Ennis
- Artist: Jeevan Kang

John Woo's 7 Brothers is a 2006 five-issue comic book limited series published under the Director's Cut imprint of Virgin Comics. The series was produced by John Woo, written by Garth Ennis and illustrated by Jeevan Kang. In 2007, the series was followed by a sequel, John Woo's 7 Brothers II, written by Ben Raab and Deric Hughes, with art by Edison George.

== Plot summary ==
Six hundred years ago, a treasure fleet set out to sail the oceans of the world. They reached every continent and discovered lands long before history's explorers stole the credit for their feats. Now, in modern-day Los Angeles, the destinies of seven men with nothing in common are drawn together in service of a mysterious young woman. An ancient prophecy must be fulfilled. Something terrible is reaching out across the centuries. There's a world to be saved. The only hope is a motley crew of so-called brothers and a power too terrifying to be used.

== Similar books ==
- The graphic novel Seven Sons, by Alexander Grecian and Riley Rossmo and released through AiT/Planet Lar, was based on the same folktale about seven Chinese brothers with unique powers. The original title of Seven Sons was 7 Brothers, but it was changed to avoid confusion with the Woo/Ennis book.

== Publications ==
- Seven Brothers (by Garth Ennis and Jeevan Kang, based on a concept by John Woo, 5-issue mini-series, Virgin Comics, 2006, tpb, 144 pages, July 2007, ISBN 1-934413-02-X)

== See also ==
- Indian comics
