= Liquid Comics =

Indian comic book publishing company

- Industry: Comics
- Founded: 2006 as Virgin Comics, renamed Liquid Comics in 2008
- Founder: Richard Branson; Deepak Chopra; Shekhar Kapur; Sharad Devarajan; Suresh Seetharaman; Gotham Chopra
- Headquarters: New York, Bangalore
- Key people: Sharad Devarajan (Co-Founder & CEO); Gotham Chopra (Co-Founder); Suresh Seetharaman (Co-Founder & President)
- Website: Official website

Liquid Comics is an Indian comic book publishing company, founded in 2006 as Virgin Comics LLC, which produces stories (many of which are Indian-culture related) for an international audience. The company was founded by Sir Richard Branson and his Virgin Group, author Deepak Chopra, filmmaker Shekhar Kapur, and entrepreneurs Sharad Devarajan, Suresh Seetharaman, and Gotham Chopra. In August 2008, the company restructured and relocated from New York to Los Angeles. On September 24, 2008, it was announced that Virgin Comics was renamed Liquid Comics after a management buyout.

== Company ==
=== Formation ===
Virgin Comics logo

Virgin Comics LLC and Virgin Animation Private Limited are collaborative companies formed by Virgin Group entrepreneur Sir Richard Branson, author Deepak Chopra, filmmaker Shekhar Kapur and Gotham Entertainment Group (South Asia's largest comics publisher) in 2006. The companies spun out of the previously announced partnership between Chopra, Kapur, and Gotham Entertainment (but not Branson). Gotham Studios Asia was announced in late 2004, planning its first release in 2005, which failed to occur. Variety reported in January 2006 that Gotham Entertainment head Sharad Devarajan and Chopra's son Gotham were the key movers, and approached Branson as a potential partner. With Branson on board, Gotham Studios Asia became Virgin Comics and Animation, with Devarajan taking the role of CEO, with Gotham Chopra as chief creative officer, with Indian advertising executive Suresh Seetharaman running Virgin Animation from India. The companies are based in Bangalore with the comics arm having its headquarters in New York. Variety reported that Devarajan and Chopra planned to spend 2006 "staffing the Indian operation with approximately 150 people, most of them artists".

Devarajan, who continues to operate Gotham Entertainment as a separate entity, stated the aim of the Virgin imprint was to "create content that not only reaches a global audience but also helps start a creative renaissance in India."

Focusing on Asia "as an area to inspire and create content and drive revenue... to reach a global audience." the two arms allow for properties to be translated into "full media properties across a wide line of products and media outlets".

Adrian Sington, Executive Chairman of Virgin Books noted that "the market for comics and graphic novels worldwide is exploding... [partly due to] the emergence of comics out of Asia." Sharad Devarajan referred to the Japanese forms of Anime and Manga, stressing their impact on world media, and outlining Virgin Comics' "mission... to spark a creative renaissance in India, reinventing Indian character entertainment and permeating this new style and vision throughout the globe... launching a new wave of characters that simultaneously appeal to audiences from Boston to Beijing to Bangalore."

=== Restructuring ===
On August 26, 2008, it was reported that Virgin Comics had shut down its New York office. A statement released by CEO Sharad Devarajan confirmed closure of the New York office, but indicated that the company would be restructuring and relocating to Los Angeles. Devarajan said that further information would be released later. Gotham Entertainment will be unaffected by this change. According to sources, Virgin will continue to own the rights for the properties which it published.

=== Liquid Comics ===
On September 24, 2008, it was announced that Virgin Comics changed its name to Liquid Comics. The company entered into an agreement with FremantleMedia Enterprises to create television shows. The first two shows in development under the partnership are First Family and Ani-Max.

Gotham Chopra was working with Michael Jackson on a graphic novel called Fated which was announced for a June 2010 release through Villard and is copyrighted to Liquid Comics.

=== Graphic India ===
On February 20, 2013, Liquid Comics began to refocus on Devarajan's company Graphic India, a digital comics and animation startup.

== Comic lines ==
Virgin Comics' initial lines were their flagship Shakti line, the Maverick (later Voices) line and the Director's Cut imprint. Although the first title, scheduled to debut mid-2006, was meant to be the first "Director's Cut" title, by John Woo, it in fact was the second "Director's Cut" comic, and Virgin's fifth overall when it debuted in October.

=== Shakti ===
The Shakti line ("Shakti" means "power" in Sanskrit) feature Indian mythology, art, history, classical stories, and other related themes, often with a modern twist. Its debut titles - two of the first three to see print from Virgin Comics - were Devi and The Sadhu. Devi was written by Siddharth Kotain, and featured "a modern take on a very ancient myth", in which title character Devi becomes a "warrior of the light" after the pantheon of gods rebirth her in response to "the rapid decay of the city of Sitapur" caused by "fearsome renegade god Bala."

The Sadhu, written by Gotham Chopra himself, is a story of revenge, from an individual who "was once a Sadhu – what, in the East, they call mystics."

=== Director's Cut ===
The Director's Cut line is designed to showcase the work of film directors, and effectively give them an unlimited budget to create works that might be more difficult to realise on screen. It sees directors such as Shekhar Kapur, Guy Ritchie and John Woo creating comics, and is rumoured to include the legendary Terry Gilliam at some point in the future. Gilliam's reputed interest (and that of the other directors) is said to be in part due to the comics' ability to "provoke new Hollywood interest in old ideas and, if nothing else, give the audience a glimpse of what [was] intended" in a potential film version. Guy Ritchie's Gamekeeper was optioned by Warner Brothers Studios to be made into a motion picture.

Virgin Comics' initial comments stated that the aim was "to launch comic titles in collaboration with iconic film-makers", with "Woo’s Seven Brothers [originally listed as] the debut comic of the Director’s Cut line". In fact, the first "Director's Cut" comic, and Virgin Comics' second overall was Snake Woman, from Shekhar Kapur and artist Zeb Wells. It revolves around 25-year-old Jessica Peterson, a Los Angeles-based woman with the tagline: "STUDENT…WAITRESS…MASS-MURDERER."

Virgin's highest-profile comic in the west, and the one announced before any other, became the company's fifth release in October, 2006. John Woo's Seven Brothers was a Chinese folklore idea was expanded by Preacher, Hitman and Punisher author Garth Ennis into "a modern, global story," in a manner that is "clearly a brother to the film medium," said Woo. John Woo described his experience "working in comics [as] quite comfortable", since "it's like the ultimate storyboard". Ennis described the manner in which he became involved as remarkably straightforward. Indeed, in his own words: "All they had to say was ‘John Woo’ and I was sold instantly." The covers were by Yoshitaka Amano, with Greg Horn producing a variant for #1.

=== Voices ===
The Voices line (formerly known as the Maverick line) is intended to feature new talent, as well as presenting comics by actors and musicians. The line's first release was in December, 2006, and written by Eurythmics frontman Dave Stewart. Dave Stewart's Walk In #1 was loosely based on "Stewart’s real-life experiences as a young man doing stage shows as "Memory Man" and – during this time of his life – suffering from odd moments of memory loss himself". It was scripted and expanded by Jeff Parker, author of the acclaimed comic Interman.

=== Other ===
Virgin comics produced a Dan Dare mini-series, written by Garth Ennis.

Additionally, "the company will tap into innovative creators in comics, film and entertainment from around the world." Virgin Comics animators have worked on graphic novels, and the venture is linked to Virgin Animation. One such graphic novel is the upcoming children's environmental book The Econauts.

At the NYCC it was revealed Grant Morrison would working with Virgin Comics to produce "webisodes" (short animated stories) based on the Mahābhārata, he said it would not be a direct translation but "Like the Beatles took Indian music and tried to make psychedelic sounds…I'm trying to convert Indian storytelling to a western style for people raised on movies, comics, and video games." It was also announced that Stan Lee will create a new superhero team to appear in a new Virgin title, the details of which were being kept secret for the moment.

Virgin also started Coalition Comix on MySpace, where users could suggest ideas for a comic which would then get made. The first one was Queen's Rook, written by Mike Carey.

==== Novel art ====
- Kama Sutra
- The Life of Buddha

== Comics creators ==
Virgin Comics' creators include:

- Jenna Jameson
- John Woo
- Nicolas Cage
- Garth Ennis
- Alex Ross
- Guy Ritchie
- Shekhar Kapur
- Deepak Chopra
- Gotham Chopra
- Samit Basu
- Dave Stewart
- Andy Diggle
- Mike Carey
- Saurav Mohapatra
- Shamik Dasgupta
- Terry Gilliam
- Edward Burns
- Duran Duran
- Bart Sears
- Ron Marz
- Grant Morrison

== Television ==
Virgin Comics will be co-producing a number of TV series with the Sci-Fi Channel and the first will be The Stranded, written by Mike Carey.

== See also ==
- Gotham Entertainment Group
- Indian comics
