= List of films: J–K =

indexed lists of films
0–9	A	B	C	D	E	F
G	H	I	J–K	L	M	N–O
P	Q–R	S	T	U–V–W	X–Y–Z	

This is an alphabetical list of film articles (or sections within articles about films). It includes made for television films. See the talk page for the method of indexing used.

== J ==
- J'accuse (1919)
- J'accuse! (1938)
- J.A.C.E. (2011)
- J'ai faim !!! (2001)
- J'ai perdu Albert (2018)
- J'ai peur d'oublier (2011 TV)
- J'ai quelque chose à vous dire (1930)
- J'ai Rencontré Le Père Noël (1984)
- J'ai rêvé sous l'eau (2008)
- J'ai tant aimé... (2008)
- J'attendrai le suivant (2002)
- J.C. (1972)
- J. Cole: 4 Your Eyez Only (2015)
- JCVD (2008)
- J. D.'s Revenge (1976)
- J. Edgar (2011)
- J. Edgar Hoover (1987)
- J'entends plus la guitare (1991)
- JFK (1991)
- JFK: 3 Shots That Changed America (2009)
- JFK Revisited: Through the Looking Glass (2021)
- JFK: The Lost Bullet (2013)
- JK Enum Nanbanin Vaazhkai (2015)
- JLA Adventures: Trapped in Time (2014)
- J-Men Forever (1979)
- JT Leroy (2018)
- J-U-N-K (1920)

=== Ja ===
- Ja saapuu oikea yö (2012)
- Ja sam iz Krajine, zemlje kestena (2013)

==== Jaa ====
- Jaadayum Mudiyum (2015)
- Jaadugar: (1989 & 2022)
- Jaag Utha Insan: (1966 & 1984)
- Jaago: (1985, 2004 & 2010)
- Jaagruti (1992)
- Jaaji Mallige (2009)
- Jaal: (1952, 1967, 1973 & 1986)
- Jaal: The Trap (2003)
- Jaalakam (1987)
- Jaali Note (1960)
- Jaan (1996)
- Jaanam Samjha Karo (1999)
- Jaan-e-Bahaar (1979)
- Jaan-E-Mann: Let's Fall in Love... Again (2006)
- Jaan Hatheli Pe (1987)
- Jaan Hazir Hai (1975)
- Jaan Ki Baazi (1985)
- Jaan Ki Kasam (1991)
- Jaan Kurbaan (2011)
- Jaan Pechaan (1991)
- Jaan Se Pyaara (1992)
- Jaan Tere Naam (1992)
- Jaana (1994)
- Jaana Pehchana (2011)
- Jaanam (1992)
- Jaanam Samjha Karo (1999)
- Jaanara Jaana (1967)
- Jaanbaaz (2019)
- Jaandaar (1979)
- Jaane-Anjaane (1971)
- Jaane Bhi Do Yaaro (1983)
- Jaane Bhi Do Yaaron (2007)
- Jaane Hoga Kya (2006)
- Jaane Jaan (1983)
- Jaane Jigar (1998)
- Jaane Kahan Se Aayi Hai (2010)
- Jaane Tu... Ya Jaane Na (2008)
- Jaaneman: (1976 & 2012)
- Jaani Dost (1983)
- Jaani Dushman (1979)
- Jaani Dushman: Ek Anokhi Kahani (2002)
- Jaani Dyakha Hawbe (2011)
- Jaanisaar (2015)
- Jaanoo (1985)
- Jaanu: (2012 & 2020)
- Jaanwar: (1983 & 1999)
- Jaathakam (1989)
- Jaathi Malli (1993)
- Jaathi Pookkal (1987)
- Jaathre (2015)
- Jaatishwar (2014)

==== Jab ====
- Jab Harry Met Sejal (2017)
- Jab Jab Phool Khile: (1965 & 1975)
- Jab Pyaar Kisise Hota Hai (1998)
- Jab Pyar Kisi Se Hota Hai (1961)
- Jab Tak Hai Jaan (2012)
- Jab We Met (2007)
- Jab Yaad Kisi Ki Aati Hai (1967)
- Jaba Jaba Maya Bascha (2011)
- Jaban (1972)
- Jabardasth (2013)
- Jabariya Jodi (2019)
- Jabberwocky: (1971 & 1977)
- Jabe Babe – A Heightened Life (2005)
- Jabilamma Pelli (1996)

==== Jac ====
- Jacaré (1942)
- Jack: (1996, 2004, 2013 TV, 2014 & 2015)
- Jack of All Trades: (1936 & 2012)
- Jack Attack (2013)
- Jack Be Nimble (1993)
- Jack and the Beanstalk: (1902, 1917, 1931, 1952, 1967, 1974 & 2009)
- Jack Brooks: Monster Slayer (2008)
- The Jack Bull (1999 TV)
- Jack of Diamonds (1967)
- The Jack of Diamonds (1949)
- Jack & Diane (2012)
- Jack the Dog (2001)
- Jack Em Popoy: The Puliscredibles (2018)
- Jack Frost: (1934, 1964, 1979 TV, 1997 & 1998)
- Jack Frost 2: Revenge of the Mutant Killer Snowman (2000)
- Jack Frusciante Left the Band (1996)
- Jack the Giant Killer: (1962 & 2013)
- Jack the Giant Slayer (2013)
- Jack Goes Boating (2010)
- Jack Goes Home (2016)
- The Jack of Hearts (1919)
- Jack and Jenny (1963)
- Jack and Jill: (1917, 1998 & 2011)
- Jack and Jill vs. the World (2008)
- Jack and Jill: A Postscript (1970)
- Jack Johnson (1970)
- Jack, Jules, Esther and Me (2013)
- Jack to a King – The Swansea Story (2014)
- Jack Lemmon – A Twist of Lemmon (1976)
- Jack London (1943)
- Jack McCall, Desperado (1953)
- Jack O'Lantern (2004)
- Jack Reacher (2012)
- Jack Reacher: Never Go Back (2016)
- Jack of the Red Hearts (2016)
- Jack Reed: Badge of Honor (1993)
- Jack Rio (2008)
- Jack the Ripper: (1959 & 1976)
- Jack Ryan: Shadow Recruit (2014)
- Jack Says (2008)
- Jack Slade (1953)
- Jack of Spades (1960)
- Jack Straw (1920)
- Jack Strong (2014)
- Jack Tar (1915)
- Jack's Back (1988)
- Jack's the Boy (1932)
- Jack-Jack Attack (2005)
- The Jack-Knife Man (1920)
- Jack-O (1995)
- Jack-Wabbit and the Beanstalk (1943)
- The Jackal: (1997 & 2010)
- Jackal of Nahueltoro (1969)
- Jackals (2017)
- The Jackals: (1917 & 1968)
- The Jackals of a Great City (1916)
- Jackass series:
  - Jackass: The Movie (2002)
  - Jackass Number Two (2006)
  - Jackass Presents: Mat Hoffman's Tribute to Evel Knievel (2008)
  - Jackass 3D (2010)
  - Jackass Presents: Bad Grandpa (2013)
  - Jackass Forever (2022)
  - Jackass: Best and Last (2026)
- Jackboot Mutiny (1955)
- Jackboots on Whitehall (2010)
- The Jackeroo of Coolabong (1920)
- The Jacket (2005)
- The Jackhammer Massacre (2004)
- Jackie: (1921, 2010, 2012 & 2016)
- Jackie Brown (1997)
- Jackie and Bruce to the Rescue (1982)
- Jackie Chan: My Stunts (1999)
- Jackie Chan's First Strike (1997)
- The Jackie Robinson Story (1950)
- Jackie & Ryan (2014)
- Jackie's Back (1999)
- Jacknife (1989)
- Jackpot: (1960, unfinished film, 1993, 2001, 2006, 2009, 2013, 2015, & 2018)
- The Jackpot (1950)
- Jackrabbit (2015)
- Jackson: (2008 & 2015)
- Jackson: My Life... Your Fault (1995)
- Jacktown (1962)
- Jacky (2000)
- Jacky in Women's Kingdom (2014)
- Jaco (2014)
- Jacob (1994)
- Jacob and Esau (1963)
- Jacob the Liar (1975)
- Jacob Two-Two Meets the Hooded Fang: (1978 & 1999)
- Jacob's Ladder: (1990 & 2019)
- Jacob's Sound (2003)
- Jacobo Timerman: Prisoner Without a Name, Cell Without a Number (1983 TV)
- Jacqueline (1956)
- Jacques Brel Is Alive and Well and Living in Paris (1975)
- Jacques and Jacotte (1936)
- Jacques and November (1984)
- Jacquou le Croquant (2007)

==== Jad–Jaf ====
- Jada (2019)
- Jade (1995)
- Jade Dynasty (2019)
- The Jade Faced Assassin (1971)
- Jade Goddess of Mercy (2003)
- Jade Love (1984)
- The Jade Mask (1945)
- The Jade and the Pearl (2010)
- Jade Warrior (2006)
- Jaded (1998)
- Jadesoturi (2006)
- Jadhikkoru Needi (1981)
- Jadi Jantem (1974)
- Jadoo: (1951 & 2013)
- Jadoogadu (2015)
- Jadu Ka Shankh (1974)
- Jadu Nagri (1940)
- Jadu Tona (1977)
- Jadugar (1946)
- Jadui Bandhan (1941)
- Jadui Kismat (1944)
- Jadui Putli (1946)
- Jadup and Boel (1980)
- Jadur Banshi (1977)
- Jadur Bashi (1977)
- Jael and Sisera (1911)
- Jaffa: (2009 & 2013)

==== Jag–Jah ====
- Jag Biti (1946)
- Jag Jeondeyan De Mele (2009)
- Jag Mandir (1991)
- Jaga Hatare Pagha (2015)
- Jaga Mecchida Maga (1972)
- Jaga Mechida Huduga (1993)
- Jagadam (2007)
- Jagadeka Veera (1991)
- Jagadeka Veerudu Athiloka Sundari (1990)
- Jagadeka Veeruni Katha (1961)
- Jagadguru Aadisankaran (1977)
- Jagadguru Adi Shankara (2013)
- Jagajyothi Basveshwara (1959)
- Jaganmohini: (1951, 1978 & 2009)
- Jagannatakam (1991)
- Jagapati (2005)
- Jagat (2015)
- Jagat Mohini (1940)
- Jagathalapratapan: (1944 & 1990)
- Jagathy Jagadeesh in Town (2002)
- Jagga (1964)
- Jagga Jasoos (2017)
- Jagga Tay Shera (1984)
- Jagged (2021)
- Jagged Edge (1985)
- Jaggu (1975)
- Jaggu Dada (2016)
- Jaggubhai (2010)
- Jagir (1984)
- Jagirdar (1937)
- Jagratha (1989)
- Jagriti (1954)
- Jagte Raho (1956)
- Jaguar: (1956, 1967, 1979, 1994 & 2016)
- Le Jaguar (1996)
- Jaguar Lives! (1979)
- The Jaguar's Claws (1917)
- Jahan Ara (1964)
- Jahan Jaaeyega Hamen Paaeyega (2007)
- Jahan Pyar Mile (1969)
- Jahan Teri Yeh Nazar Hai (1981)
- Jahan Tum Le Chalo (1999)
- Jahan Tum Wahan Hum (1968)

==== Jai ====
- Jai: (2004 Tamil & 2004 Telugu)
- Jai Bangladesh (1971)
- Jai Bhim (2021)
- Jai Bhim Comrade (2011)
- Jai Bhole (2018)
- Jai Bolo Telangana (2011)
- Jai Chiranjeeva (2005)
- Jai Devaa (unreleased)
- Jai Gangaajal (2016)
- Jai Hind (1994)
- Jai Ho (2014)
- Jai Ho Democracy (2015)
- Jai Jagannatha (2007)
- Jai Jawaan Jai Kisaan (2016)
- Jai Jawan (1970)
- Jai Jawan Jai Makan (1971)
- Jai Jwala (1972)
- Jai Kaali (1992)
- Jai Karnataka (1989)
- Jai Karoli Maa (1988)
- Jai Lalitha (2014)
- Jai Lava Kusa (2017)
- Jai Maharashtra Dhaba Bhatinda (2013)
- Jai Maruthi 800 (2016)
- Ja Mata Di (1977)
- Jai Mummy Di (2019)
- Jai Radhe Krishna (1974)
- Jai Santoshi Maa (1975)
- Jai Simha (2018)
- Jai Sriram (2013)
- Jai Swadesh (1940)
- Jai Veeru (2009)
- Jai Vikraanta (1995)
- Jaider, der einsame Jäger (1971)
- Jaihind (2012)
- Jaihind 2 (2014)
- Jail: (2009 & 2021)
- Jail Bait: (1937, 1954 & 2004)
- Jail Birds (1914)
- Jail Birds of Paradise (1934)
- Jail Breakers (2002)
- Jail Busters (1955)
- Jail House Blues (1942)
- Jail Yatra: (1947 & 1981)
- Jailbait (2004)
- The Jailbird (1920)
- Jailbirds: (1940, 1991 & 2015)
- Jailbreak: (1936 & 2017)
- Jailbreak in Hamburg (1971)
- Jailbreakers (1994)
- The Jailbreakers (1960)
- Jailer: (2023 Tamil & 2023 Malayalam)
- The Jailhouse (2010)
- Jailhouse Rock (1957)
- Jailor: (1938 & 1958)
- Jailor Gaari Abbayi (1994)
- Jailppulli (1957)
- Jaime: (1974 & 1999)
- Jaisi Karni Waisi Bharnii (1989)
- Jait Re Jait (1977)
- Jaitra Yatra (1991)

==== Jaj–Jak ====
- Jajabara (1975)
- Jajantaram Mamantaram (2003)
- Jajo's Secret (2009 TV)
- Jak básníci neztrácejí naději (2004)
- Jak dostat tatínka do polepšovny (1978)
- Jak se Franta naučil bát (1959)
- Jak se zbavit Helenky (1967)
- Jaka Sembung (1981)
- Jakarta Twilight (2011)
- Jakarta Undercover (2007)
- Jake Spanner, Private Eye (1989 TV)
- Jake Speed (1986)
- Jake Squared (2013)
- Jake's Corner (2008)
- Jakkamma (1972)
- Jakkanna (2016)
- Jako kníže Rohan (1983)
- Jakob the Liar (1999)
- Jakob's Wife (2021)

==== Jal ====
- Jal (2013)
- Jal Bin Machhli Nritya Bin Bijli (1971)
- Jal Mahal (1980)
- Jalachhayam (2010)
- Jalakanyaka (1971)
- Jalal's Story (2014)
- Jalam (2016)
- Jalamarmaram (1999)
- Jalan Kembali: Bohsia 2 (2012)
- Jalatharangam (1978)
- Jalebi (2018)
- Jalisco Sings in Seville (1949)
- Jalitgeola (1927)
- Jalla! Jalla! (2000)
- Jallaad (1995)
- Jallian Wala Bagh (1977)
- Jallikattu (1987)
- Jallikattu Kaalai (1994)
- Jalna (1935)
- Jalolsavam (2004)
- Jalopy (1953)
- Jalpari: The Desert Mermaid (2012)
- Jalsa: (2008 & 2016)
- Jalsaghar (1958)
- Jalte Badan (1973)
- Jalti Nishani (1932)

==== Jam ====
- Jam (2006)
- Jam Session (1942)
- Jam Session (1944)
- Jam Session (1999)
- Jama (2024)
- A Jamaâ (2010)
- Jamadagni (1988)
- Jamai 420 (2015)
- Jamai Badal (2019)
- Jamai Raja (1990)
- Jamai Sasthi (1931)
- Jamaibabu (1996)
- Jamaibabu Jindabad (2001)
- Jamaica Inn (1939)
- Jamaica Motel (2006)
- Jamaica Run (1953)
- Jamba Lakidi Pamba: (1992 & 2018)
- Jambhavan (2006)
- Jamboo (1980)
- Jamboo Savari (2014)
- Jamboree (1944)
- Jamboree (1957)
- Jambulingam (1982)
- Jambulingam 3D (2016)
- Jambyl (1953)
- Jameen Kottai (1995)
- James (2005)
- James (2008)
- James (2022)
- James & Alice (2016)
- James Bay 1975: The Shock of Two Nations (2025)
- James Blunt: Return to Kosovo (2007)
- James Bond (1999)
- James Bond (2015)
- James Bond series:
  - Casino Royale (1967 & 2006)
  - Diamonds Are Forever (1971)
  - Die Another Day (2002)
  - Dr. No (1962)
  - For Your Eyes Only (1981)
  - From Russia with Love (1963)
  - GoldenEye (1995)
  - Goldfinger (1964)
  - Licence to Kill (1989)
  - Live and Let Die (1973)
  - The Living Daylights (1987)
  - The Man with the Golden Gun (1974)
  - Moonraker (1979)
  - No Time to Die (2021)
  - Octopussy (1983)
  - On Her Majesty's Secret Service (1969)
  - Quantum of Solace (2008)
  - Skyfall (2012)
  - Spectre (2015)
  - The Spy Who Loved Me (1977)
  - Thunderball (1965)
  - Tomorrow Never Dies (1997)
  - A View to a Kill (1985)
  - The World Is Not Enough (1999)
  - You Only Live Twice (1967)
- The James Brothers of Missouri (1949)
- James Brown: Man to Man (1968)
- James Dean (1976) (TV)
- James Dean (2001) (TV)
- James Dean: The First American Teenager (1976)
- The James Dean Story (1957)
- James and the Giant Peach (1996)
- James Joyce's Women (1985)
- James Tont operazione U.N.O. (1965)
- James Tont operazione D.U.E. (1966)
- James White (2015)
- James' Journey to Jerusalem (2003)
- Jamesy Boy (2014)
- Jamie Marks Is Dead (2014)
- Jamila (2011)
- Jamila, the Algerian (1958)
- Jamila dan Sang Presiden (2009)
- Jamilya (1968)
- The Jammed (2007)
- Jammin' the Blues (1944)
- Jamna Par (1946)
- Jamna Pyari (2015)
- Jamón jamón (1992)

==== Jan ====
- Jan Amos Comenius (1983)
- Jan Dara (2001)
- Jan Dara the Beginning (2012)
- Jan Dara: The Finale (2013)
- Jan Hus: (1954 & 2015)
- Jan Vermeulen, the Miller of Flanders (1917)
- Jan Źiźka (1955)
- Jana (2004)
- Jana Aranya (1976)
- Jana Gana Mana (2012)
- Janaadhipan (2019)
- Janaan (2016)
- Janakan (2010)
- Janakeeya Kodathi (1985)
- Janakiraman (1997)
- Janala (2009)
- Janam: (1985 & 1993)
- Janam Janam Na Saathi (1977)
- Janam Kundli (1995)
- Janam Se Pehle (1994)
- Jananam (2004)
- Janani: (1993 & 2006)
- Janani Janmabhoomi (1984)
- Janapriyan (2011)
- Janasheen (2003)
- Janatar Aadalat (2008)
- Janathipathyam (1997)
- Janbaaz (1986)
- Janda Pai Kapiraju (2015)
- Jandamarra's War (2011)
- Jandek on Corwood (2004)
- Jane: (1915, 2016 & 2017)
- The Jane Austen Book Club (2007)
- Jane Austen's Mafia! (1998)
- Jane Doe (2001)
- Jane Eyre: (1910, 1934, 1943, 1970 TV, 1973 TV, 1983 TV, 1996, 1997 & 2011)
- Jane Got a Gun (2015)
- Jane and the Lost City (1987 TV)
- Jane Shore (1915)
- Jane Steps Out (1938)
- Jane Wants a Boyfriend (2015)
- Jane White Is Sick & Twisted (2002)
- Jane's House (1994)
- Janeane from Des Moines (2012)
- Jangan Pandang Belakang (2007)
- Jangan Pandang Belakang 2: Aku Tahu Asal Usulmu (2024)
- Jangan Pandang Belakang Congkak (2009)
- Janghwa Hongryeon jeon: (1924, 1936, 1956 & 1972)
- Jango (1984)
- Jani (2017)
- Janice Beard (1999)
- Janice Meredith (1924)
- Janie: (1944 & 2006)
- Janika (1949)
- Janji Joni (2005)
- Janky Promoters (2009)
- Jannat (2008)
- Jannat 2 (2012)
- The January Man (1989)

==== Jao–Jar ====
- Jaoon Kahan Bata Ae Dil (2018)
- Japan (2008)
- Japan Japan (2007)
- Japan, Our Homeland (2006)
- Japan Yin Thwe (1935)
- Japan's Longest Day (1967)
- Japanese Devils (2001)
- The Japanese Dog (2013)
- Japanese Girls Never Die (2016)
- A Japanese Idyll (1912)
- A Japanese Nightingale (1918)
- Japanese Relocation (1942)
- Japanese Story (2003)
- A Japanese Tragedy (1953)
- Japanese War Bride (1952)
- The Japanese Wife (2010)
- The Japanese Woman (1919)
- Japanil Kalyanaraman (1985)
- Japón (2002)
- Japon İşi (1987)
- Jappeloup (2013)
- Jaque Mate (2011)
- The Jar (1984)
- The Jar: A Tale From the East (2001)
- Jar City (2006)
- Jara Bristite Bhijechhilo (2007)
- Jarasandha (2011)
- Jargo (2004)
- Jarhead (2005)
- Jarka a Věra (1938)
- Jarní vody (1968)
- Jarosław Dąbrowski (1976)
- Jarrett (1973 TV)
- Jarum Halus (2008)
- Jarvik (2019)

==== Jas–Jav ====
- Jasamine Freckel's Love Affair (1921)
- Jasmine (2015)
- Jasmine Women (2004)
- Jaśnie pan szofer (1935)
- Jason and the Argonauts (1963)
- Jason Becker: Not Dead Yet (2012)
- Jason Bourne (2016)
- Jason Goes to Hell: The Final Friday (1993)
- Jason and Shirley (2015)
- Jason Takes Manhattan (1989)
- Jason X (2002)
- Jason's Letter (2017)
- Jason's Lyric (1994)
- Jasper Goes Hunting (1944)
- Jasper and the Haunted House (1942)
- Jasper in a Jam (1946)
- Jasper Jones (2017)
- Jasper, Texas (2003)
- Jassy (1947)
- Jatagam (1953)
- Jathara (1980)
- Jathi (2005)
- Jathi Ratnalu (2021)
- Jatinga Ityadi (2007)
- Jatra (2016)
- Jatra: Hyalagaad Re Tyalagaad (2006)
- Jatrai Jatra (2019)
- Jatt James Bond (2014)
- Jatt & Juliet (2012)
- Jatt & Juliet 2 (2013)
- Jatt Pardesi (2015)
- Jatt Punjab Daa (1992)
- Jatt Te Dogar (1983)
- Jatta (2013)
- Jatts In Golmaal (2013)
- Jattu Engineer (2017)
- Jatugriha (1964)
- Jauja (2014)
- Una Jaula no tiene secretos (1962)
- Jaundya Na Balasaheb (2016)
- Java Head: (1923 & 1934)
- Java Heat (2013)
- Javier's Passion (2019)

==== Jaw–Jaz ====
- Jawaan (2017)
- Jawaani (1984)
- Jawaani Jaaneman (2020)
- Jawab: (1942, 1970 & 1995)
- Jawai Maaza Bhala (2008)
- Jawan (2023)
- Jawan Ki Pukar (1942)
- Jawan Mohabbat (1971)
- Jawan of Vellimala (2012)
- Jawani (1942)
- Jawani Diwani (1972)
- Jawani Diwani: A Youthful Joyride (2006)
- Jawani Ka Rang (1941)
- Jawani Ki Hawa (1935)
- Jawani Phir Nahi Ani series:
  - Jawani Phir Nahi Ani (2015)
  - Jawani Phir Nahi Ani 2 (2018)
- Jawani Zindabaad (2010)
- Jawani Zindabad (1990)
- Jawbone (2017)
- Jawbreaker (1999)
- Jawker Dhan (2017)
- Jaws series:
  - Jaws (1975)
  - Jaws 2 (1978)
  - Jaws 3-D (1983)
  - Jaws: The Revenge (1987)
- Jaws of Death (2005)
- Jaws in Japan (2009)
- Jaws of Justice (1933)
- Jaws of Satan (1982)
- Jaws of Steel (1927)
- The Jay Bird (1920)
- Jay Jay (2003)
- Jay and Seth versus the Apocalypse (2007)
- Jay and Silent Bob Reboot (2019)
- Jay and Silent Bob Strike Back (2001)
- Jay & Silent Bob's Super Groovy Cartoon Movie (2013)
- Jaya (2002)
- Jaya Ganga (1996)
- Jaya Janaki Nayaka (2017)
- Jaya Jaya Jaya Jaya Hey (2022)
- Jaya Pita Jaya (2010)
- Jaya Sri Amathithuma (2019)
- Jayabheri (1959)
- Jayadeb (1962)
- Jayakodi (1940)
- Jayam: (1999, 2002 & 2003)
- Jayam Manade: (1956 & 1986)
- Jayam Manadera (2000)
- Jayamkondaan (2008)
- Jayamma Panchayathi (2022)
- Jayammana Maga (2013)
- Jayammu Nischayammu Raa: (1989 & 2016)
- Jayantabhai Ki Luv Story (2013)
- Jayanti (2021)
- Jayaprada (1939)
- Jayeshbhai Jordaar (2022)
- Jayasimha: (1955 & 1987)
- Jayeebhava (2009)
- Jayhawkers (2014)
- The Jayhawkers! (1959)
- Jayikkaanaay Janichavan (1978)
- The Jayne Mansfield Story (1980 TV)
- Jayne Mansfield's Car (2012)
- Jazbaa (2015)
- Jazbaat: (1980 & 1994)
- Jazz All Around (1969)
- Jazz Boat (1960)
- The Jazz Cinderella (1930)
- The Jazz Girl (1926)
- Jazz Heaven (1929)
- Jazz and Jailbirds (1919)
- Jazz Mad (1928)
- Jazz Mama (2010)
- Jazz Musume Tanjō (1957)
- Jazz Is My Native Language (1983)
- Jazz Rhythm (1930)
- The Jazz Singer: (1927, 1952 & 1980)
- Jazz on a Summer's Day (1959)
- A Jazzed Honeymoon (1919)
- Jazzgossen (1958)
- Jazzin' for Blue Jean (1984)
- Jazzland (1928)
- A Jazzman's Blues (2022)
- Jazzmania (1923)
- Jazzy (2024)

=== Je ===
- Je Bho Ramrai Bho (2003)
- Je suis Charlie (2015)
- Je fais le mort (2013)
- Je t'aime John Wayne (2000)
- Je l'ai été trois fois (1952)
- Je lutte donc je suis (2015)
- Je me souviens: (2002 & 2009)
- Je Pan Kahish E Sachuj Kahish (2016)
- Je Suis Auto (TBD)
- Je suis Karl (2021)
- Je suis le seigneur du château (1989)
- Je suis né d'une cigogne (1999)
- Je suis timide mais je me soigne (1978)
- Je suis un sentimental (1955)
- Je t'aime, je t'aime (1968)
- Je t'aime moi non plus (1976)
- Je Tu Il Elle (1974)
- Je vous aime (1980)
- Je vous salue, mafia! (1965)
- Je vous trouve très beau (2006)

==== Jea–Jed ====
- The Jealous God (2005)
- Jealous Husbands (1923)
- Jealous James (1914)
- Jealous as a Tiger (1964)
- Jealousy: (1916, 1922, 1925, 1929, 1932, 1934, 1942, 1945, 1953 Finnish, 1953 Italian, 1999 & 2013)
- Jealousy Is My Middle Name (2002)
- Jean and the Calico Doll (1910)
- Jean Charles (2009)
- Jean Chouan (1926)
- Jean de Florette (1986)
- Jean of the Joneses (2016)
- Jean-Michel Basquiat: The Radiant Child (2010)
- Jean-Philippe (2006)
- Jean's Plan (1946)
- Jeanne (1934)
- Jeanne d'Arc (1899)
- Jeanne Dielman, 23 quai du Commerce, 1080 Bruxelles (1975)
- Jeanne du Barry (2023)
- Jeanne Eagels (1957)
- Jeannette: The Childhood of Joan of Arc (2017)
- Jeannie (1941)
- Jeans (1998)
- Jebu Donga: (1975 & 1987)
- Jed's Trip to the Fair (1916)
- Jedenácté přikázání (1935)
- Jedda (1955)
- Jeder stirbt für sich allein (1962)
- Jedermann (1961)
- The Jedi Hunter (2002)

==== Jee ====
- Jee Aayan Nu (2002)
- Jeedar (1981)
- Jeem Boom Bhaa (2019)
- Jeena Hai Toh Thok Daal (2012)
- Jeena Isi Ka Naam Hai (2017)
- Jeena Marna Tere Sang (1992)
- Jeena Sirf Merre Liye (2002)
- Jeena Teri Gali Mein (1991)
- Jeena Yahan (1979)
- Jeene Do (1990)
- Jeene Ki Arzoo (1981)
- Jeene Ki Raah (1969)
- Jeene Nahi Doonga (1984)
- Jeeo Aur Jeene Do (1982)
- Jeeo Shaan Se (1997)
- Jeepers Creepers: (1939 animated & 1939 live-action)
- Jeepers Creepers series:
  - Jeepers Creepers (2001)
  - Jeepers Creepers 2 (2003)
  - Jeepers Creepers 3 (2017)
  - Jeepers Creepers: Reborn (2022)
- Jeerjimbe (2018)
- Jeet: (1949, 1972 & 1996)
- Jeet Hamaari (1983)
- Jeete Hain Shaan Se (1988)
- Jeetenge Hum (2011)
- Jeeva: (1986, 1988, 1995, 2009 & 2014)
- Jeevakke Jeeva (1981)
- Jeevan (1944)
- Jeevan Baator Logori (2009)
- Jeevan Dhaara (1982)
- Jeevan Ek Sanghursh (1990)
- Jeevan Jyoti (1976)
- Jeevan Ki Shatranj (1993)
- Jeevan Lata (1936)
- Jeevan Mrityu (1970)
- Jeevan Mukt (1977)
- Jeevan Naiya (1936)
- Jeevan Prabhat (1937)
- Jeevan Sangram (1974)
- Jeevan Sathi (1962)
- Jeevan Swapna (1946)
- Jeevan Yatra (1946)
- Jeevan Yudh (1997)
- Jeevana Chaitra (1992)
- Jeevana Chakra (1985)
- Jeevana Jokali (1972)
- Jeevana Jyothi: (1975, 1987 & 1988)
- Jeevana Mukthi (1942)
- Jeevana Nataka (1943)
- Jeevana Poratam (1986)
- Jeevana Tarangalu (1973)
- Jeevana Teeralu (1977)
- Jeevana Tharanga (1963)
- Jeevanaamsam (1968)
- Jeevanadhi (1996)
- Jeevanadi (1970)
- Jeevante Jeevan (1985)
- Jeevikkan Anuvadikku (1967)
- Jeevikkan Marannupoya Sthree (1974)
- Jeevitha Chakram (1971)
- Jeevitha Nouka (1951)
- Jeevitham (1950)
- Jeevitham Oru Gaanam (1979)
- Jeevithayaathra (1965)
- Jeevithe Lassanai (2012)
- Jeewan Hathi (2016)
- Jeewan Jyoti (1953)
- Jeeya Jurir Xubax (2014)

==== Jef–Jep ====
- Jefe (2018)
- Jeff (1969)
- Jeff Gordon, Secret Agent (1963)
- Jeff, Who Lives at Home (2012)
- Jefferson in Paris (1995)
- Jeffrey: (1995 & 2016)
- Jeffrey Archer: The Truth (2002)
- The Jeffrey Dahmer Files (2012)
- Jeg drepte! (1942)
- Jeg elsker dig (1957)
- Jeg har elsket og levet (1940)
- Jekhane Ashray (2009)
- Jekhane Bhooter Bhoy (2012)
- Jekyll (2007)
- Jekyll and Hyde... Together Again (1982)
- Jellyfish (2007)
- Jellyfish Eyes (2013)
- Jem and the Holograms (2015)
- Jemima & Johnny (1966)
- Jenatsch (1987)
- Jenma Natchathram (1991)
- Jennie (1940)
- Jennie Gerhardt (1933)
- The Jennie Project (2001)
- Jennifer: (1953 & 1978)
- Jennifer 8 (1992)
- Jennifer Hale (1937)
- Jennifer on My Mind (1971)
- Jennifer's Body (2009)
- Jenny: (1936, 1958, 1962 TV & 1970 TV)
- Jenny Be Good (1920)
- Jenny Is a Good Thing (1969)
- Jenny Kissed Me (1986)
- Jenny Lind (1932)
- Jenny and the Soldier (1947)
- Jenny's Stroll Through Men (1929)
- Jenny's Wedding (2015)
- The Jensen Project (2010)
- Jenu Goodu (1963)
- Jeon Woo-chi: The Taoist Wizard (2009)
- Jeopardy (1953)
- Jephtah's Daughter: A Biblical Tragedy (1909)
- Jeppe på bjerget (1981)

==== Jer ====
- Jeremiah (1998 TV)
- Jeremiah Johnson (1972)
- Jeremy (1973)
- Jeremy Hardy vs. the Israeli Army (2003)
- Jeremy Scott: The People's Designer (2015)
- Jericho: (1937, 1946, 1991 & 2000)
- Jericho Mansions (2003)
- The Jericho Mile (1979 TV)
- Jerichow (2008)
- The Jerk (1979)
- The Jerk, Too (1984 TV)
- The Jerky Boys: The Movie (1995)
- Jerky Turkey (1945)
- Jerry (2006)
- Jerry Before Seinfeld (2017)
- Jerry Cotton (2010)
- Jerry-Go-Round (1966)
- Jerry and the Goldfish (1951)
- Jerry, Jerry, Quite Contrary (1966)
- Jerry and Jumbo (1953)
- Jerry and the Lion (1950)
- Jerry Maguire (1996)
- Jerry and Tom (1998)
- Jerry's Cousin (1951)
- Jerry's Diary (1949)
- Jerry's Mother-In-Law (1913)
- Jersey: (2019 & 2022)
- Jersey Boys (2014)
- Jersey Girl: (1992 & 2004)
- Jersey Shore Shark Attack (2012 TV)
- Jerusalem: (1996 & 2013)
- Jerusalem Countdown (2011)
- The Jerusalem File (1972)
- JeruZalem (2015)

==== Jes ====
- Jes' Call Me Jim (1920)
- Jessabelle (2014)
- Jesse James: (1927 & 1939)
- Jesse James at Bay (1941)
- Jesse James vs. the Daltons (1954)
- Jesse James, Jr. (1942)
- Jesse James Meets Frankenstein's Daughter (1966)
- Jesse James as the Outlaw (1921)
- Jesse James Under the Black Flag (1921)
- Jesse James' Kid (1965)
- Jesse James' Women (1954)
- Jesse Owens (2012)
- The Jesse Owens Story (1984 TV)
- Jesse Stone series:
  - Stone Cold (2005 TV)
  - Jesse Stone: Night Passage (2006 TV)
  - Jesse Stone: Death in Paradise (2006 TV)
  - Jesse Stone: Sea Change (2007 TV)
  - Jesse Stone: Thin Ice (2009 TV)
  - Jesse Stone: No Remorse (2010 TV)
  - Jesse Stone: Innocents Lost (2011 TV)
  - Jesse Stone: Benefit of the Doubt (2012 TV)
  - Jesse Stone: Lost in Paradise (2015 TV)
- The Jesse Ventura Story (1999 TV)
- Jessica (1962)
- Jessicka Rabid (2010)
- Jessie (2016)
- Jessie's Dad (2011)
- The Jester: (1937 & 1988)
- The Jester and the Queen (1987)
- The Jester's Supper (1942)
- A Jester's Tale (1964)
- #Jestem M. Misfit (2019)
- "#JeSuis" (2018)
- Jesus: (1973, 1979, 1999 & 2016)
- Jesus Camp (2006)
- Jesus Christ Superstar (1973)
- Jesus Christ Vampire Hunter (2001)
- Jesus Christ's Horoscope (1989)
- Jesus Freak (2003)
- Jesus Henry Christ (2012)
- Jesus Is King (2019)
- Jesus of Montreal (1989)
- Jesus of Nazareth (1977)
- Jesus Is a Palestinian (1999)
- Jesus People: The Movie (2009)
- Jesus Revolution (2023)
- The Jesus Rolls (2019)
- Jesus – The Film (1986)
- Jesus' Son (1999)

==== Jet–Jez ====
- Jet Attack (1958)
- The Jet Benny Show (1986)
- The Jet Cage (1962)
- Jet Carrier (1954)
- Jet Job (1952)
- Jet Lag (2002)
- Jet Li's The Enforcer (1995)
- Jet Over the Atlantic (1959)
- Jet Pilot (1957)
- Jet Set (2000)
- Jet Storm (1959)
- Jete Nahi Dibo (TBD)
- Jetpiloter (1961)
- Jetsam (2007)
- The Jetsons series:
  - The Jetsons Meet the Flintstones (1987)
  - Jetsons: The Movie (1990)
  - The Jetsons & WWE: Robo-WrestleMania! (2017)
- Jett Jackson: The Movie (2001)
- Jettatore: (1919 & 1938)
- Jettchen Gebert's Story (1918)
- La jetée (1962)
- Jetuka Pator Dore (2011)
- Jeu (2006)
- Le Jeune Werther (1993)
- Jeux d'enfants (2004)
- The Jew (1996)
- Jew Süss (1934)
- Jew Suss: Rise and Fall (2010)
- Jewboy (2005)
- Jewel: (1915 & 2001)
- The Jewel: (1933 & 2011)
- The Jewel of the Nile (1985)
- A Jewel in Pawn (1917)
- Jewel Robbery (1932)
- Jewel of the Sahara (2001)
- Jewel Thief (1967)
- Jewelpet the Movie: Sweets Dance Princess (2012)
- Jewels of Brandenburg (1947)
- Jewels of Desire (1927)
- The Jewess and the Captain (1994)
- The Jewess of Toledo (1919)
- A Jewish Girl in Shanghai (2010)
- The Jewish Steppe (2001)
- The Jews (2016)
- Jews and Baseball: An American Love Story (2010)
- Jews and Buddhism (1999)
- Jews of Egypt (2013)
- Jews of Iran (2005)
- Jews on Land (1927)
- Jewtopia (2012)
- Jexi (2019)
- Jezebel: (1938 & 2019)
- The Jezebels (1975)

=== Jh ===
- Jhanak Jhanak Payal Baaje (1955)
- Jhankaar Beats (2003)
- Jhansi Ki Rani (1953)
- Jhansi Rani (1988)
- Jheel Ke Us Paar (1973)
- Jhimma (2021)
- Jhinder Bandi (1961)
- Jhing Chik Jhing (2010)
- Jhol (unreleased)
- Jhoola: (1941 & 1962)
- Jhoom Barabar Jhoom (2007)
- Jhoomar (2007)
- Jhoota Kahin Ka (1979)
- Jhooth Bole Kauwa Kaate (1998)
- Jhootha Hi Sahi (2010)
- Jhoothi (1985)
- Jhoothi Shaan (1991)
- Jhuk Gaya Aasman (1968)
- Jhumke (1946)
- Jhummandi Naadam (2010)
- Jhumroo (1961)
- Jhumura (2015)
- Jhund (2019)
- Jhutha Sach (1984)
- Jhuthi Sharm (1940)

=== Ji ===
- Ji (2005)

==== Jia–Jim ====
- Jia Aur Jia (2017)
- Jian Bing Man (2015)
- Jiang Hu (2004)
- Jiang hu: The Triad Zone (2000)
- Jiang Ziya (2020)
- Jiao Yulu (1990)
- Jiban Maran (1938)
- Jiban Saikate (1972)
- Jiban Trishna (1957)
- Jibon Niye Khela (1999)
- Jibon Theke Neya (1970)
- Jibril (2018)
- Jídlo (1992)
- Jig (2011)
- Jigar (1992)
- Jigariyaa (2014)
- Jigarthanda: (2014 & 2016)
- Jigarwala (1991)
- Jiggs and Maggie series:
  - Bringing Up Father (1946)
  - Jiggs and Maggie in Society (1947)
  - Jiggs and Maggie in Court (1948)
  - Jiggs and Maggie in Jackpot Jitters (1949)
  - Jiggs and Maggie Out West (1950)
- Jigoku (1960)
- Jigoku: Japanese Hell (1999)
- Jigokumon (1953)
- Jigsaw: (1949, 1962, 1968, 1979, 1989 & 2017)
- The Jigsaw Man (1983)
- Jihad: A Story of the Others (2015 TV)
- A Jihad for Love (2008)
- Jihne Mera Dil Luteya (2011)
- Jiivi (2019)
- Jiivi 2 (2022)
- Jil (2015)
- Jil Jung Juk (2016)
- Jilebi: (2015 & 2017)
- Jill Rips (2000)
- The Jill & Tony Curtis Story (2008)
- Jilmil Jonak (2014)
- The Jilt (1922)
- Jilted (1987)
- Jim & Andy: The Great Beyond (2017)
- Jim in Bold (2003)
- Jim Brown: All-American (2002)
- Jim, the Conqueror (1926)
- Jim Dine: A Self-Portrait on the Walls (1995)
- Jim Hanvey, Detective (1937)
- Jim the Penman: (1915 & 1921)
- Jim & Piraterna Blom (1987)
- Jim Thorpe – All-American (1951)
- Jim the World's Greatest (1976)
- Jim: The James Foley Story (2016)
- Jim's Atonement (1912)
- Jimi Plays Monterey (1986)
- Jimi: All Is by My Side (2013)
- Jimi Hendrix (1973)
- Jiminy Glick in Lalawood (2004)
- Jimmie's Millions (1925)
- Jimmy: (1979, 2008, 2013 & 2026)
- Jimmy Boy (1935)
- Jimmy, the Boy Wonder (1966)
- Jimmy the Gent (1934)
- Jimmy Hollywood (1994)
- Jimmy and Judy (2006)
- Jimmy the Kid (1982)
- Jimmy Neutron: Boy Genius (2001)
- Jimmy P: Psychotherapy of a Plains Indian (2013)
- Jimmy and Sally (1933)
- The Jimmy Show (2001)
- Jimmy: The Tale of a Girl and Her Bear (1923)
- Jimmy Vestvood: Amerikan Hero (2016)
- Jimmy Zip (1996)
- Jimmy's Hall (2014)
- Jimmywork (2004)
- Jimpa (2025)

==== Jin–Jiy ====
- Jin-Roh (1999)
- Jina Sikho (1946)
- Jindabyne (2006)
- Jindalee Lady (1990)
- Jindua (2017)
- Jingle All the Way: (1996 & 2011 TV)
- Jingle All the Way 2 (2014)
- Jingle and Bell's Christmas Star (2014 TV)
- Jingle Jangle (2020)
- Jingles the Clown (2009)
- Jingzhe (2004)
- Jinn (2013)
- Jinnah (1998)
- Jinni (2010)
- Jinpa (2018)
- Jinsei no Yakusoku (2016)
- Jinuyo Saraba: Kamuroba Mura e (2015)
- Jinx (1919)
- Jinx Money (1948)
- Jinxed (2013)
- Jinxed! (1982)
- Jio Pagla (2017)
- Jiraiya the Hero (1921)
- Jirga (2018)
- Jiro Dreams of Sushi (2011)
- Jis Desh Mein Ganga Behti Hai (1960)
- Jis Desh Mein Ganga Rehta Hain (2000)
- Jism: (2003, 2006 & 2016)
- Jism 2 (2012)
- Jit (1990)
- Jithan (2005)
- Jithan 2 (2016)
- A Jitney Elopement (1915)
- Jitterbugs (1943)
- Jivaro (1954)
- Jive Junction (1943)
- Jivin' in Be-Bop (1947)
- Jiyo Kaka (2011)
- Jiyo To Aise Jiyo (1981)

=== Jj ===
- Jjunction (2002)

=== Jo ===
- Jo (1971)
- Jo Bole So Nihaal (2005)
- Jo and the Boy (2015)
- Jo Darr Gya Woh Marr Gya (1995)
- Jo Jeeta Wohi Sikandar (1992)
- Jo Jo Dancer, Your Life Is Calling (1986)
- Jo Jo in the Stars (2003)
- Jo for Jonathan (2010)
- Jo Pil-ho: The Dawning Rage (2019)

==== Joa–Jod ====
- Joan of Arc: (1900, 1935, 1948 & 2019)
- Joan of Arc of Mongolia (1989)
- Joan of Arc at the Stake (1954)
- Joan Didion: The Center Will Not Hold (2017)
- Joan Does Dynasty (1986)
- Joan Lui (1985)
- Joan the Maiden (1994)
- Joan of Ozark (1942)
- Joan of Paris (1942)
- Joan of Plattsburg (1918)
- Joan Rivers: A Piece of Work (2010)
- Joan and the Voices (2011)
- Joan the Woman (1916)
- Joanna: (1925, 1968 & 2013)
- Joanne Lees: Murder in the Outback (2007 TV)
- Joaquim (2017)
- The Job: (2003 & 2009)
- Job, czyli ostatnia szara komórka (2006)
- Joba (2019)
- Jobs (2013)
- Jobson's Luck (1913)
- Jocaste (1925)
- Jocelyn: (1933 & 1952)
- Jock the Hero Dog (2011)
- Jockey (2021)
- Jocks (1987)
- The Jockstrap Raiders (2011)
- Jodi: (1999 & 2001)
- Jodi Arias: Dirty Little Secret (2013 TV)
- Jodi Breakers (2012)
- Jodi Kya Banayi Wah Wah Ramji (2003)
- Jodi No.1 (2001)
- Jodorowsky's Dune (2013)

==== Joe–Jog ====
- Joe: (1924, 1970 & 2013)
- Joe Bell (2020)
- Joe + Belle (2011)
- Joe Bullet (1973)
- Joe Butterfly (1957)
- Joe and Caspar Hit the Road (2015)
- Joe Cinque's Consolation (2016)
- Joe Dakota: (1957 & 1972)
- Joe Dirt (2001)
- Joe Dirt 2: Beautiful Loser (2015)
- Joe and Ethel Turp Call on the President (1939)
- Joe Glow, the Firefly (1941)
- Joe Gould's Secret (2000)
- Joe Kidd (1972)
- Joe the King (1999)
- The Joe Louis Story (1953)
- Joe MacBeth (1955)
- Joe and Max (2002)
- Joe the Menace (1955)
- Joe the Red (1936)
- Joe Somebody (2001)
- Joe Strummer: The Future Is Unwritten (2007)
- Joe Torre: Curveballs Along the Way (1997 TV)
- Joe Versus the Volcano (1990)
- Joe's Apartment (1996)
- Joe's Bed-Stuy Barbershop: We Cut Heads (1983)
- Joe's So Mean to Josephine (1996)
- Joe's Violin (2016)
- Joey: (1977, 1985, 1986 & 1997)
- Joey Boy (1965)
- Joffa: The Movie (2010)
- Jogajog (2015)
- Jogan (1950)
- Jogayya (2011)
- Joggers' Park (2003)
- Jogi (2005)
- Jogo de Damas (2015)
- Jogwa (2009)

==== Joh ====
- Joh's Jury (1993)
- Johan (1921)
- John A.: Birth of a Country (2011)
- John Appa Rao 40 Plus (2008)
- John Barleycorn (1914)
- John Carter (2012)
- John Dies at the End (2012)
- John Doe: Vigilante (2014)
- John F. Kennedy: Years of Lightning, Day of Drums (1966)
- John Halifax (1938)
- John Halifax, Gentleman: (1910 & 1915)
- John Henry: (2000 & 2020)
- John Henry and the Inky-Poo (1946)
- John Heriot's Wife (1920)
- John and the Hole (2021)
- John Hus (1977)
- John Jani Janradhan: (1984 & 2016)
- John Meade's Woman (1937)
- John Paul Jones (1959)
- John Q (2002)
- John Rabe (2009)
- John Smith (1922)
- John Tucker Must Die (2006)
- John Wesley (1954)
- John Wick series:
  - John Wick (2014)
  - John Wick: Chapter 2 (2017)
  - John Wick: Chapter 3 – Parabellum (2019)
  - John Wick: Chapter 4 (2023)
- John Wycliffe: The Morning Star (1984)
- Johnno's Dead (2016)
- Johnny: (1980, 2003 & 2018)
- Johnny 100 Pesos (1993)
- Johnny Angel (1945)
- Johnny Apollo (1940)
- Johnny Belinda: (1948 & 1967 TV)
- Johnny Cash! The Man, His World, His Music (1969)
- Johnny Come Lately (1943)
- Johnny Comes Flying Home (1946)
- Johnny Concho (1956)
- Johnny Cool (1963)
- Johnny Corncob (1973)
- Johnny Dangerously (1984)
- Johnny Dark (1954)
- Johnny Doesn't Live Here Any More (1944)
- Johnny Doughboy (1942)
- Johnny Eager (1942)
- Johnny English series:
  - Johnny English (2003)
  - Johnny English Reborn (2011)
  - Johnny English Strikes Again (2018)
- Johnny Frank Garrett's Last Word (2016)
- Johnny Frenchman (1945)
- Johnny Get Your Gun (1919)
- Johnny Get Your Hair Cut (1927)
- Johnny Be Good (1988)
- Johnny Got His Gun (1971)
- Johnny Guitar (1954)
- Johnny Handsome (1989)
- Johnny Holiday (1949)
- Johnny Johnny Yes Papa (2018)
- Johnny Kapahala: Back on Board (2007)
- Johnny Mad Dog (2008)
- Johnny Mnemonic (1995)
- Johnny Nobody (1961)
- Johnny O'Clock (1947)
- Johnny One-Eye (1950)
- Johnny Reno (1966)
- Johnny Sharma (2008)
- Johnny Shiloh (1963) (TV)
- Johnny Skidmarks (1998)
- Johnny on the Spot (1954)
- Johnny Stool Pigeon (1949)
- Johnny Suede (1991)
- Johnny Tremain (1957)
- Johnny Tsunami (1999)
- Johnny, You're Wanted (1956)
- Johns (1997)
- Johnson Family Vacation (2004)
- Johnny (1993)
- Johny I Love You (1982)
- Johny Johny Yes Appa (2018)
- Johny Mera Naam (1970)
- Johny Mera Naam Preethi Mera Kaam (2011)
- Johny Tolengo, el majestuoso (1987)

==== Joi–Jol ====
- Joi Baba Felunath (1979)
- Join the Flumeride (1998)
- Join the Marines (1937)
- Joint Body (2011)
- The Joint Brothers (1986)
- Joint Security Area (2000)
- Jojo Rabbit (2019)
- JoJo's Bizarre Adventure series:
  - JoJo's Bizarre Adventure: Phantom Blood (2007)
  - JoJo's Bizarre Adventure: Diamond Is Unbreakable Chapter I (2017)
- The Joke (1969)
- A Joke of Destiny (1983)
- The Joke Thief (2018)
- The Joke's on You (1925)
- Joker: (1993, 2000, 2012, 2016 & 2019)
- The Joker: (1928 & 1960)
- The Joker Is Wild (1957)
- The Joker King (1935)
- Joker: Folie à Deux (2024)
- The Jokers (1967)
- The Jokes (2004)
- Jolanda, the Daughter of the Black Corsair (1953)
- Jolanta the Elusive Pig (1945)
- Jolene (2008)
- Le Joli Mai (1963)
- Jolly (1998)
- A Jolly Bad Fellow (1964)
- Jolly Boy (2011)
- The Jolly Boys' Last Stand (2000)
- Jolly Fellows: (1934 & 2009)
- Jolly Hallo (2001)
- Jolly Life (2009)
- Jolly Little Elves (1934)
- Jolly LLB series:
  - Jolly LLB (2013)
  - Jolly LLB 2 (2017)
- Jolly Roger: Massacre at Cutter's Cove (2005)
- Jolson Sings Again (1949)
- The Jolson Story (1946)

==== Jom–Jor ====
- Jom kha mung wej (2005)
- Jomer Raja Dilo Bor (2015)
- Jomfru Trofast (1921)
- Jon (1983)
- Jonah Hex (2010)
- Jonah and the Pink Whale (1995)
- Jonah Who Lived in the Whale (1993)
- Jonah Who Will Be 25 in the Year 2000 (1976)
- Jonah: A VeggieTales Movie (2002)
- Jonas Brothers: The 3D Concert Experience (2009)
- Jonas in the Jungle (2013)
- Jonathan: (1970, 2016 & 2018)
- Jonathan of the Bears (1993)
- Jonathan Livingston Seagull (1973)
- Jonathan: The Boy Nobody Wanted (1992)
- Jonathas' Forest (2012)
- The Jones Family in Big Business (1937)
- The Jones Family in Hollywood (1939)
- The Joneses (2010)
- The Joneses Have Amateur Theatricals (1909)
- Jonestown: Paradise Lost (2007)
- Jonestown: The Life and Death of Peoples Temple (2006)
- Jongens (2014) (TV)
- Jongno (1933)
- Joni (1980)
- Joni's Promise (2005)
- Jonmo Theke Jolchi (1981)
- Jonny Quest vs. The Cyber Insects (1995)
- Jonny Saves Nebrador (1953)
- Jonny's Golden Quest (1993)
- Jons und Erdme (1959)
- Jonsun and Gonsun (2001)
- Jor (2008)
- Jora 10 Numbaria (2017)
- Joradighir Chowdhury Paribar (1966)
- Jordan Is a Hard Road (1915)
- Jordon Saffron Taste This! (2009)
- Jorge Mautner: O Filho do Holocausto (2012)
- Joroo Ka Ghulam (1972)
- Joru Ka Ghulam (2000)
- Jory (1973)

==== Jos ====
- José and Pilar (2010)
- José do Telhado: (1929 & 1945)
- Josee, the Tiger and the Fish (2003)
- Josef (2011)
- Josef the Chaste: (1930 & 1953)
- Joseph: (1995 & 2018)
- Joseph and the Amazing Technicolor Dreamcoat (1999)
- Joseph Andrews (1977)
- Joseph and the Dreamer (1962)
- Joseph: King of Dreams (2000)
- Joseph in the Land of Egypt (1932)
- Joseph & Mary (2016)
- Joseph of Nazareth (2000)
- Joseph Smith: The Prophet of the Restoration (2005)
- Joseph's Gift (1998)
- Josephine (2001)
- The Josephine Baker Story (1991)
- Josephine and Men (1955)
- Josette: (1937 & 1938)
- Josh: (2000, 2009 Telugu & 2010)
- Jhossh (2009)
- Josh Jarman (2004)
- Josh and S.A.M. (1993)
- Josh: Independence Through Unity (2013)
- Joshikō (2016)
- Joshua: (1976, 2002 & 2007)
- Joshua: Teenager vs. Superpower (2017)
- Joshua Then and Now (1985)
- Joshua Tree (1993)
- Joshy (2016)
- Josie (2018)
- Josie and the Pussycats (2001)
- Josselyn's Wife: (1919 & 1926)
- Josser in the Army (1932)
- Josser on the Farm (1934)
- Josser Joins the Navy (1932)
- Josser on the River (1932)

==== Jot–Jou ====
- Jothe Jotheyali (2006)
- Jothegara (2010)
- Jothi: (1939 & 2022)
- Le Jouet criminel (1969)
- Jour de fête (1949)
- Le Jour se Leve (1940)
- Journal of a Crime (1934)
- A Journal for Jordan (2021)
- Journalist (1979)
- The Journalist: (1967 & 1979)
- The Journals of Knud Rasmussen (2006)
- The Journals of Musan (2011)
- Journey: (1972 & 1995 TV)
- The Journey: (1942, 1959, 1986, 1992, 1995, 2004, 2014 Malaysian, 2016 & 2017)
- Journey 2: The Mysterious Island (2012)
- Journey of Akaki (1912)
- Journey Among Women (1977)
- Journey to Ararat (2011)
- Journey to Arzrum (1936)
- The Journey of August King (1995)
- Journey Back to Oz (1972)
- Journey Back to Youth (2001)
- Journey Beneath the Desert (1961)
- Journey Beyond Sodor (2017)
- Journey Beyond Three Seas (1957)
- Journey of Bhangover (2017)
- A Journey Called Love (2002)
- Journey to the Center of the Earth: (1959, 1989, 1993 TV, 2008 TV, 2008 direct-to-video & 2008)
- A Journey to the Center of the Earth (1977)
- Journey into Darkness (1968 TV)
- Journey to the End of the Night (2006)
- Journey from the Fall (2006)
- Journey into Fear: (1943 & 1975)
- A Journey of Happiness (2019)
- The Journey Home (2014)
- Journey of Hope (1990)
- Journey to Italy (1954)
- The Journey of Jared Price (2000)
- The Journey of Karma (2018)
- Journey into Life: The World of the Unborn (1990)
- Journey into Light (1951)
- A Journey to London (1975 TV)
- Journey for Margaret (1942)
- Journey into Medicine (1947)
- The Journey to Melonia (1989)
- The Journey of Natty Gann (1985)
- Journey into the Night (1921)
- Journey Out of Darkness (1967)
- Journey to Paradise Falls (2009)
- The Journey of Punjab 2016 (2016)
- Journey of a Red Fridge (2007)
- A Journey of Samyak Buddha (2013)
- Journey into Self (1968)
- Journey into Spring (1958)
- Journey for Survival (1981)
- Journey Through China (2015)
- A Journey Through Fairyland (1985)
- A Journey Through Filmland (1921)
- Journey Through the Past (1973)
- Journey Through Rosebud (1972)
- The Journey to Tilsit (1939)
- Journey Together (1945)
- Journey to the West: Conquering the Demons (2013)
- The Journey of a Young Composer (1985)
- Journey from Zanskar (2010)
- Journey's End: (1930, 2010 & 2017)
- Journeyman (2017)

==== Jov–Joy ====
- Joven, viuda y estanciera (1970)
- #Jowable (2019)
- Joy: (2010 & 2015)
- Joy Division: (2006 & 2007)
- Joy and the Dragon (1916)
- Joy of Fatherhood (2014)
- The Joy Girl (1927)
- Joy House (1964)
- Joy of Learning (1969)
- The Joy of Life (2005)
- The Joy of Living (1961)
- The Joy Luck Club (1993)
- Joy in the Morning (1965)
- Joy Ride: (1935, 2000 & 2023)
- Joy Ride series:
  - Joy Ride (2001)
  - Joy Ride 2: Dead Ahead (2008)
  - Joy Ride 3 (2014)
- Joy Scouts (1939)
- Joy Street (1929)
- The Joy That Kills (1984)
- Joy de V. (2013)
- Joyeux Noël (2005)
- Joyful Journeys (2018)
- Joyful Noise (2012)
- Joyjatra (2004)
- Joyless Street (1925)
- Joymoti: (1935 & 2006)
- The Joyous Liar (1919)
- Joyride: (1977, 1997, 2005 & 2022)
- The Joyriders (1999)
- Joys of the Youth (1987)
- Joysticks (1983)

=== Ju ===
- Ju Dou (1990)
- Ju-On series:
  - Ju-On: The Curse (2000)
  - Ju-On: The Curse 2 (2000)
  - Ju-On: The Grudge (2002)
  - Ju-On: The Grudge 2 (2003)
  - Ju-On: White Ghost (2009)
  - Ju-On: Black Ghost (2009)
  - Ju-On: The Beginning of the End (2014)
  - Ju-On: The Final Curse (2015)
- Ju-Rei: The Uncanny (2004)

==== Jua–Jud ====
- Juan Apóstol, el más amado (2019)
- Juan of the Dead (2010)
- Juan Moreira: (1936, 1948 & 1973)
- Juan Pistolas: (1936 & 1966)
- Juan que reía (1976)
- Juan Simón's Daughter: (1935 & 1957)
- Juan Tamad at Mister Shooli sa Mongolian Barbecue (1991)
- Juan & Ted: Wanted (2000)
- Juanita: (1935 & 2019)
- Juanito (1960)
- Juarez (1939)
- Juarez 2045 (2017)
- Juarez and Maximillian (1934)
- Jubal (1956)
- Jubiabá (1986)
- Jubilee (1978)
- Jubilee Bunt-a-thon (2012)
- The Jubilee of Mr Ikel (1955)
- Jubilee Trail (1954)
- Jubilee Window (1935)
- Jubilo (1919)
- Jubilo, Jr. (1924)
- The Jucklins (1921)
- Jucy (2010)
- Jud Süß (1940)
- Judaai: (1980 & 1997)
- Judas: (1930, 1936, 2001 & 2004)
- Judas and the Black Messiah (2021)
- Judas Ghost (2013)
- Judas Kiss: (1998 & 2011)
- Judas' Kiss (1954)
- The Judas Project (1990)
- The Judas of Tyrol (1933)
- Jude (1996)
- Judex: (1916, 1934 & 1963)
- The Judge: (1921, 1960, 1984 & 2014)
- The Judge and the Assassin (1976)
- Judge for a Day (1935)
- Judge Dredd (1995)
- Judge and the Forest (1975)
- The Judge and the General (2008)
- Judge Hardy and Son (1939)
- Judge Hardy's Children (1938)
- The Judge and Jake Wyler (1972 TV)
- Judge Not: (1914 & 1920)
- Judge Not; or The Woman of Mona Diggings (1915)
- Judge Priest (1934)
- The Judge Steps Out (1948)
- Judgement: (1990 TV, 1992, 1999 & 2020)
- The Judgement Book (1935)
- Judgement Day: (1949, 1988 & 2013)
- Judgment (1990)
- The Judgment (2014)
- The Judgment House (1917)
- Judgment in Berlin (1988)
- Judgment Day (1999)
- Judgment Night (1993)
- Judgment at Nuremberg (1961)
- Judith: (1923 & 1966)
- Judwaa (1997)
- Judy (2019)
- Judy Berlin (1999)
- Judy Moody and the Not Bummer Summer (2011)
- Judy and Punch (2019)

==== Jue–Jum ====
- Juego de Héroes (2016)
- Juego de Niños (1995)
- Juego peligroso (1967)
- Jug Band Hokum (2015)
- Jug Face (2013)
- Jugaadi Dot Com (2015)
- Jugaari (2010)
- Le Juge Fayard dit Le Shériff (1977)
- Juggernaut: (1936 & 1974)
- The Juggler (1953)
- Jugni: (2011 & 2016)
- Jugnu: (1947 & 1973)
- Juha: (1937 & 1999)
- Juice (1992)
- Juicio de faldas (1969)
- Juke-Bar (1989)
- Juke Box Jenny (1942)
- Juke Box Rhythm (1959)
- Juke box urli d'amore (1959)
- Juke Girl (1942)
- Juke Joint (1947)
- Jukti Takko Aar Gappo (1974)
- Jules and Jim (1961)
- Jules of the Strong Heart (1918)
- Jules Verne's Mysterious Island: (1961 & 2012 TV)
- Julia: (1974, 1977, 2008, 2014 & 2021)
- Julia's Eyes (2010)
- Julia Has Two Lovers (1991)
- Julian Bond: Reflections from the Frontlines of the Civil Rights Movement (2012)
- Juliana (1988)
- Julie: (1956, 1975, 1998, 2004 & 2006)
- Julie 2 (2017)
- Julie & Julia (2009)
- Julie and Me (1998)
- Julie Walking Home (2002)
- Julien Donkey-Boy (1999)
- Juliet & Romeo (2025)
- Juliet, Naked (2018)
- Juliet of the Spirits (1965)
- Julieta (2016)
- Julietta (1953)
- Juliette, or Key of Dreams (1951)
- Julieum 4 Perum (2017)
- Julio comienza en julio (1979)
- Julius Caesar: (1914, 1950, 1953 & 1970)
- Julius Caesar Against the Pirates (1962)
- Julot the Apache (1921)
- July 4 (2007)
- July 7 (2016)
- July Days (1923)
- July Kaatril (2019)
- July Rain (1967)
- July Rhapsody (2002)
- Jumanji franchise:
  - Jumanji (1995)
  - Jumanji: Welcome to the Jungle (2017)
  - Jumanji: The Next Level (2019)
- Jumbo (2008)
- Jump: (1999, 2009 & 2012)
- Jump! (2007)
- Jump Britain (2005 TV)
- Jump for Glory (1937)
- Jump the Gun (1997)
- Jump into Hell (1955)
- Jump In! (2007 TV)
- Jump London (2003 TV)
- Jumper: (1991 & 2008)
- Jumpin' at the Boneyard (1992)
- Jumpin' Jack Flash (1986)
- Jumpin' Jupiter (1955)
- Jumping (1986)
- Jumping the Broom (2011)
- Jumping Into the Abyss (1933)
- Jumping Jacks (1952)
- Jumping for Joy (1956)
- Jumping Ship (2001)
- Jumpman (2018)

==== Jun ====
- Junction: (2012 & 2024)
- The Junction Boys (2002 TV)
- Junction City (1952)
- June (2019)
- June 9 (2008)
- June 17th, 1994 (2010)
- June Night (1940)
- Junebug (2005)
- Jung: (1996 & 2000)
- Jung Baaz (1989)
- Junga (2018)
- Jungfer, Sie gefällt mir (1969)
- The Jungle: (1914, 1952, & 1967)
- Jungle: (2000 & 2017)
- Jungle 2 Jungle (1997)
- Jungle Adventurer (1965)
- The Jungle Book: (1942, 1967, 1994 & 2016)
- The Jungle Book: Mowgli's Story (1998)
- The Jungle Book 2 (2003)
- A Jungle Book of Regulations (1974)
- Jungle Boy: (1987 & 1998)
- Jungle Bride (1933)
- The Jungle Bunch (2017)
- Jungle Captive (1945)
- Jungle Cat (1960)
- Jungle Cavalcade (1941)
- Jungle Child (2011)
- Jungle Cruise (2021)
- Jungle Emperor Leo (1997)
- Jungle Fever (1991)
- Jungle Flight (1947)
- Jungle Gents (1954)
- Jungle Goddess (1948)
- Jungle Headhunters (1951)
- Jungle Heat (1957)
- Jungle Hell (1955)
- Jungle Holocaust (1977)
- Jungle Jim (1948)
- Jungle Jim in the Forbidden Land (1952)
- Jungle Jingles (1929)
- Jungle Jitters (1938)
- Jungle Ka Jawahar (1953)
- Jungle Ka Qanoon (1995)
- Jungle Ki Beti (1988)
- Jungle Ki Pukar (1946)
- The Jungle King (1994)
- Jungle Love (1990)
- Jungle Man (1941)
- Jungle Man-Eaters (1954)
- Jungle Manhunt (1951)
- Jungle Master (2013)
- Jungle Moon Men (1955)
- Jungle Mystery (1932)
- Jungle Patrol: (1944 & 1948)
- The Jungle Princess (1936)
- Jungle Raiders (1985)
- Jungle Rhythm (1929)
- Jungle Shuffle (2014)
- Jungle Siren (1942)
- Jungle Stampede (1950)
- Jungle Street (1960)
- Jungle Warriors (1984)
- Jungle Woman: (1926 & 1944)
- Junglee: (1961, 2009 & 2019)
- Junglee Tarzan (2001)
- Jungleland (2019)
- Junior: (1994 & 2008)
- Junior Army (1942)
- Junior Bonner (1972)
- The Junior Defenders (2007)
- Junior G-Men (1940)
- Junior G-Men of the Air (1942)
- Junior High School (1978)
- Junior Mandrake (1997)
- Junior Miss (1945)
- Junior Prom (1946)
- Junior Senior: (2002 & 2005)
- Juniper Tree (2003)
- The Juniper Tree (1990)
- Junk (1999)
- Junk Mail (1997)
- The Junk Shop (1965)
- The Junkman (1982)
- The Junky's Christmas (1993)
- Junkyard Dog (2010)
- Juno (2007)
- Juno and the Paycock (1930)
- Junoon: (1978 & 1992)

==== Jup–Juw ====
- Jupiter Ascending (2015)
- Jupiter's Darling (1955)
- Jupiter's Moon (2017)
- Jupiter's Thigh (1980)
- El Juramento de Lagardere (1955)
- Jurassic Park series:
  - Jurassic Park (1993)
  - The Lost World: Jurassic Park (1997)
  - Jurassic Park III (2001)
  - Jurassic World (2015)
  - Jurassic World: Fallen Kingdom (2018)
  - Jurassic World Dominion (2022)
  - Jurassic World Rebirth (2025)
- Jurassic Shark (2012)
- Jurm: (1990 & 2005)
- Jurmana: (1979 & 1996)
- The Juror (1996)
- Juror #2 (2024)
- Juror 8 (2019)
- Jurrat (1991)
- Jury Duty (1995)
- The Jury of Fate (1917)
- Jury's Evidence (1936)
- The Jury's Secret (1938)
- Jus primae noctis (1972)
- Jushin Thunder Liger: Fist of Thunder (1995)
- Jusqu'à toi (2009)
- Jusqu'au bout de la nuit (1995)
- Just Across the Street (1952)
- Just Add Water (2008)
- Just Another Blonde (1926)
- Just Another Day: (2008 & 2009)
- Just Another Girl on the I.R.T. (1992)
- Just Another Love Story (2007)
- Just Another Margin (2014)
- Just Another Missing Kid (1981)
- Just Another Pandora's Box (2010)
- Just Another Romantic Wrestling Comedy (2006)
- Just Any Woman (1949)
- Just Around the Corner: (1921 & 1938)
- Just Ask for Diamond (1988)
- Just Before Dawn: (1946 & 1981)
- Just Before I Go (2014)
- Just Before Losing Everything (2013)
- Just Before Nightfall (1971)
- Just Behind the Door (1984)
- Just Between Friends (1986)
- Just Between Us (2010)
- Just Beyond This Forest (1991)
- Just a Breath Away (2018)
- Just Broke Up (2008)
- Just Buried (2007)
- Just Business (2008)
- Just Call Me Nobody (2010)
- Just Cause (1995)
- Just Desserts (2004 TV)
- Just Dogs (1932)
- Just Dropped In (1919)
- Just Ducky (1951)
- Just an Echo (1934)
- Just Follow Law (2007)
- Just Friends: (1993 & 2005 & 2018)
- Just Friends? (2009)
- Just for Fun (1963)
- Just a Game (1983)
- Just Getting Started (2017)
- Just a Gigolo: (1931 & 1978)
- Just a Girl (1916)
- Just Go with It (2011)
- Just Gold (1913)
- Just Henry (2011)
- Just Heroes (1989)
- Just Imagine (1930)
- Just Inès (2010)
- Just Jim: (1915 & 2015)
- Just Joe (1960)
- Just for Kicks: (2003 & 2005)
- Just a Kiss (2002)
- Just Let Go (2015)
- Just a life – the story of Fridtjof Nansen (1968)
- Just Like Brothers (2012)
- Just Like Heaven (2005)
- Just Like Our Parents (2017)
- Just Like the Son (2006)
- Just Like Us (2010)
- Just Like a Woman: (1912, 1923, 1939, 1967, 1992 & 2012)
- Just a Little Harmless Sex (1999)
- Just a Little Inconvenience (1977 TV)
- Just Looking (1999)
- Just Love Me (2006)
- Just Maath Maathalli (2010)
- Just Maduveli (2015)
- Just Married: (1928, 2003 & 2007)
- Just a Matter of Duty (1993)
- Just Me and You (1978)
- Just, Melvin: Just Evil (2000)
- Just Mercy (2019)
- Just Mickey (1930)
- Just My Luck: (1933, 1936, 1957 & 2006)
- Just Neighbors (1919)
- Just Not Married (2016)
- Just Nuts (1915)
- Just Off Broadway: (1924, 1929 & 1942)
- Just Once a Great Lady: (1934 & 1957)
- Just for One Day (2008)
- Just One Drink (2015)
- Just One of the Girls (1993)
- Just One of the Guys (1985)
- Just One Look (2002)
- Just One More Time (1974)
- Just Out of Reach (1979)
- Just Pals (1920)
- Just Peck (2009)
- Just Peggy (1918)
- A Just Punishment (1914)
- Just a Question of Love (2000 TV)
- Just Rambling Along (1918)
- Just Say Hi (2013)
- Just Sex and Nothing Else (2005)
- Just Sue Me (2000)
- Just Suppose (1926)
- Just Tell Me What You Want (1980)
- Just This Once (1952)
- Just the Ticket (1999)
- Just in Time (1997)
- Just for Tonight (1918)
- Just Us (1986 TV)
- Just Visiting (2001)
- Just a Walk in the Park (2002 TV)
- Just Walking (2008)
- Just Watch Me: Trudeau and the '70s Generation (1999)
- Just William (1940)
- Just William's Luck (1947)
- Just a Woman: (1918 & 1925)
- Just Wright (2010)
- Just Write (1997)
- Just for You: (1952 & 2017)
- Just You and Me, Kid (1979)
- Justice: (1914, 1917, 1993, & 2002 short)
- Justice League (2017)
- Justice League Dark (2017)
- Justice League Dark: Apokolips War (2020)
- Justice League vs. the Fatal Five (2019)
- Justice League vs. Teen Titans (2016)
- Justice League: Crisis on Two Earths (2010)
- Justice League: Doom (2012)
- Justice League: The Flashpoint Paradox (2013)
- Justice League: Gods and Monsters (2015)
- Justice League: The New Frontier (2008)
- Justice League: Throne of Atlantis (2015)
- Justice League: War (2014)
- Justice Society: World War II (2021)
- Justice, My Foot! (1992)
- Justin Bieber: Never Say Never (2011)
- Justine: (1969 & 2020)
- Jutra (2014)
- Jutro idziemy do kina (2007 TV)
- Juvana (2013)
- Juvana 2: Terperangkap Dalam Kebebasan (2015)
- Juvenile (2000)
- Juvenile Court (1938)
- The Juvenile Judge (1960)
- Juvenile Jungle (1958)
- Juvenile Liaison (1975)
- Juvenile Offender (2012)
- Juvenilia (1943)
- Juwanna Mann (2002)

=== Jw–Jy ===
- Jwaalamukhi (1985)
- Jwaar Bhata (1973)
- Jwala: (1969, 1971 & 1985)
- Jwala Daku (1981)
- Jwala Dweepa Rahasyam (1965)
- Jwalamukhi: (1980 & 2000)
- Jwanita (2015)
- Jwar Bhata: (1944 & 1973)
- Jwlwi: The Seed (2019)
- Jyeshta (2004)
- Jyeshthoputro (2019)
- Jyot Jale (1973)
- Jyothi (1976)
- Jyothi Lakshmi (2015)
- Jyoti: (1981 & 1988)
- Jyoti Bane Jwala (1980)
- Jyotibacha Navas (1975)

== K ==
- K (2002)
- K: Missing Kings (2014)
- K-11 (2012)
- K-13 (2019)
- K-19: The Widowmaker (2002)
- K2 (1991)
- K2: Siren of the Himalayas (2012)
- K-20: Legend of the Mask (2008)
- K3 en de Kattenprins (2007)
- K3 en het ijsprinsesje (2006)
- K3 en het Magische Medaillon (2004)
- K-9 (1989)
- K-9: P.I. (2002)
- K-911 (1999)
- KD No:1 (1978)
- K.G.F: Chapter 1 (2018)
- KIL (2014)
- KL 10 Patthu (2015)
- KL Gangster (2011)
- KL Gangster 2 (2013)
- KL Special Force (2018)
- KLK Calling PTZ – The Red Orchestra (1971)
- K-PAX (2001)
- KT (2002)

=== Ka ===
- Ka Kee (1980)
- Ka Kha Ga Gha (2018)
- Ka Kha Ga Gha Umo (1970)

==== Kaa ====
- Kaa (1965)
- Kaabil (2017)
- Kaada Beladingalu (2007)
- Kaadaaru Maasam (1976)
  1. Kaadal Kahaani (2022)
- Kaadhal: (1952 & 2004)
- Kaadhal Kavithai (1998)
- Kaadhal Kondein (2003)
- Kaadhal Mannan (1998)
- Kaadhal Oviyam (1982)
- Kaadhal Solla Vandhen (2010)
- Kaadhale Nimmadhi (1998)
- Kaadhali (1997)
- Kaadu: (1952, 1973 Kannada, 1973 Malayalam & 2014)
- Kaadu Kudure (1979)
- Kaadu Pookkunna Neram (2016)
- Kaaf Kangana (2019)
- Kaafi Thota (2017)
- Kaafila (2007)
- Kaafiron Ki Namaaz (2016)
- Kaagaz (2019)
- Kaagaz Ke Fools (2015)
- Kaagaz Ke Phool (1959)
- Kaagaz Ki Nao (1975)
- Kaahalam (1981)
- Kaajal (1965)
- Kaaka Muttai (2015)
- Kaakan (2015)
- Kaakha Kaakha (2003)
- Kaaki Sattai (2015)
- Kaakki Sattai (2015)
- Kaakka (2021)
- Kaakum Karangal (1965)
- Kaal: (2005 & 2007)
- Kaal Madhumas (2013)
- Kaal Sandhya (1997)
- Kaala: (2017 & 2018)
- Kaala Aadmi (1978)
- Kaala Koothu (2018)
- Kaala Patthar (1979)
- Kaala Rathri (1987)
- Kaala Samrajya (1999)
- Kaala Sona (1975)
- Kaalai (2008)
- Kaalaiyum Neeye Maalaiyum Neeye (1988)
- Kaalakaandi (2018)
- Kaalal Pada (1989)
- Kaalam: (1981 & 1982)
- Kaalam Kaathu Ninnilla (1979)
- Kaalam Maari Kadha Maari (1987)
- Kaalam Maari Pochu: (1956 & 1996)
- Kaalamellam Kaathiruppen (1997)
- Kaalamellam Kadhal Vaazhga (1997)
- Kaalangalil Aval Vasantham (1976)
- Kaalapani (1996)
- Kaalbela (2009)
- Kaalchilambu (2018)
- Kaali: (1980 & 2018)
- Kaalia: (1981 & 1997)
- Kaalinga (1980)
- Kaaliya Mardhanam (1982)
- Kaama (1999)
- Kaamam Krodham Moham (1975)
- Kaamana Billu (1983)
- Kaamannana Makkalu (2008)
- Kaamchor (1982)
- Kaamyab (1984)
- Kaanaakkinaavu (1996)
- Kaanal Neer (1961)
- Kaanatha Veshangal (1967)
- Kaanathaya Penkutty (1985)
- Kaanch Ki Deewar (1986)
- Kaanchi: The Unbreakable (2014)
- Kaanchi Thalaivan (1963)
- Kaand: Black Scandal (2013)
- Kaante (2002)
- Kaantha Valayam (1980)
- Kaapalika (1973)
- Kaappaan (2019)
- Kaaryasthan (2010)
- Kaash: (1987 & 2015)
- Kaashh (2012)
- Kaashi in Search of Ganga (2018)
- Kaashmora (2016)
- Kaasi (2004)
- Kaasua, komisario Palmu! (1961)
- Kaaterskill Falls (2001)
- Kaathadi (2018)
- Kaathala Kaathala (1998)
- Kaathil Oru Kinnaram (1996)
- Kaathirunna Divasam (1983)
- Kaathirunna Nimisham (1978)
- Kaathirupaen Unakaaha (1977)
- Kaathiruppor Pattiyal (2018)
- Kaatrin Mozhi (2018)
- Kaatrinile Varum Geetham (1978)
- Kaatru Veliyidai (2017)
- Kaatrukkenna Veli (2001)
- Kaattaruvi (1983)
- Kaatteri (2022)
- Kaattile Paattu (1982)
- Kaattile Thadi Thevarude Ana (1995)
- Kaattu (2017)
- Kaattu Kallan (1981)
- Kaattu Rani: (1965 & 1985)
- Kaattum Mazhayum (2015)
- Kaattumaina (1963)
- Kaattumallika (1966)
- Kaaval (2015)
- Kaaval (2021)
- Kaaval Dheivam (1969)
- Kaaval Nilayam (1991)
- Kaavalan (2011)
- Kaavalkaaran (1967)
- Kaavalmaadam (1980)
- Kaavilamma (1977)
- Kaaviya Thalaivan (2014)
- Kaaviya Thalaivi (1970)
- Kaaviyyan (2019)
- Kaay Raav Tumhi (2015)
- Kaayamkulam Kochunniyude Makan (1976)
- Kaazhcha (2004)

==== Kab ====
- Kab? Kyoon? Aur Kahan? (1970)
- Kab Tak Chup Rahungi (1988)
- Kaba Sone Hti (2005)
- Kabaddi: (2009 & 2013)
- Kabaddi Kabaddi (2015)
- Kabaddi Once Again (2012)
- Kabadi Kabadi (2001)
- Kabadieen! Gekitotsu Dokuro Koko hen (2014)
- Kabali (2016)
- Kabani Nadi Chuvannappol (1975)
- Kabayan, Becomes a Billionaire (2010)
- Kabeela (1976)
- Kabei: Our Mother (2008)
- Kabhi Alvida Naa Kehna (2006)
- Kabhi Andhera Kabhi Ujala (1958)
- Kabhi Dhoop Kabhi Chhaon (1971)
- Kabhi Haan Kabhi Naa (1994)
- Kabhi Khushi Kabhie Gham (2001)
- Kabhi Na Kabhi (1998)
- Kabhi Pyar Na Karna (2008)
- Kabhie Ajnabi The (1985)
- Kabhie Kabhie (1976)
- Kabhie Tum Kabhie Hum (2002)
- Kabir (2018)
- Kabir Singh (2019)
- Kabisera (2016)
- Kabita (1977)
- Kabloonak (1994)
- Kabluey (2007)
- Kaboklei (2009)
- Kabooliwala (1993)
- Kaboom (2010)
- Kaboye Alludu (1987)
- Kabrastan (1988)
- Kabukicho Love Hotel (2014)
- Kabul Express (2006)
- Kabula Barabula (2017)
- Kabuli Kid (2008)
- Kabuliwala: (1957 & 1961)
- Kabut Sutra Ungu (1979)
- Kabzaa (1988)

==== Kac ====
- Kac Wawa (2012)
- Kaccha Limboo (2011)
- Kacha Devayani (1941)
- Kachcha Chor (1977)
- Kachche Dhaage (1999)
- Kachche Heere (1981)
- Kachchi Sadak (2006)
- Kachehri (1994)
- Kacheri Arambam (2010)

==== Kad ====
- Kadachit (2008)
- Kadaicha (1988)
- Kadaikutty Singam (2018)
- Kadaisi Bench Karthi (2017)
- Kadaisi Vivasayi (2022)
- Kadaksham (2010)
- Kadal: (1968 & 2013)
- Kadal Kadannu Oru Maathukutty (2013)
- Kadal Meengal (1981)
- Kadal Pookkal (2001)
- Kadala Mage (2006)
- Kadaladu Vadaladu (1969)
- Kadalai (2016)
- Kadalamma (1963)
- Kadalkkaattu (1980)
- Kadalora Kavithaigal (1986)
- Kadalpalam (1969)
- Kadamai Kanniyam Kattupaadu (1987)
- Kadamba: (1983 & 2004)
- Kadamban (2017)
- Kadambari (2015)
- Kadan Vaangi Kalyaanam (1958)
- Kadaram Kondan (2019)
- Kadathanaattu Maakkam (1978)
- Kadathanadan Ambadi (1990)
- Kadathu (1981)
- Kadathukaran (1965)
- Kadavu (1991)
- Kadavul Irukaan Kumaru (2016)
- Kadavul Paathi Mirugam Paathi (2015)
- Kadavulai Kanden (1963)
- Kadavulin Kuzhandhai (1960)
- Kadawunu Poronduwa: (1947 & 1982)
- Kaddish (1924)
- Kaddu Beykat (1975)
- Kadeddulu Ekaram Nela (1960)
- Kadha, Samvidhanam Kunchakko (2009)
- Kadha Paranja Kadha (2018)
- Kadha Thudarunnu (2010)
- Kadhal 2 Kalyanam (unreleased)
- Kadhal Azhivathillai (2002)
- Kadhal Desam (1996)
- Kadhal Dot Com (2004)
- Kadhal Enum Nadhiyinile (1989)
- Kadhal FM (2005)
- Kadhal Kadhai (2009)
- Kadhal Kaditham (2008)
- Kadhal Kan Kattudhe (2017)
- Kadhal Kasakuthaiya (2017)
- Kadhal Kirukkan (2003)
- Kadhal Kisu Kisu (2003)
- Kadhal Kottai (1996)
- Kadhal Palli (1997)
- Kadhal Parisu (1987)
- Kadhal Pisase (2012)
- Kadhal Rojavae (2000)
- Kadhal Sadugudu (2003)
- Kadhal Samrajyam (unreleased)
- Kadhal Vaaganam (1968)
- Kadhal Virus (2002)
- Kadhalagi (2010)
- Kaadhalan (1994)
- Kadhalar Dhinam (1999)
- Kadhale En Kadhale (2006)
- Kadhalikka Neramillai (1964)
- Kadhalikka Vanga (1972)
- Kadhalil Sodhappuvadhu Yeppadi (2012)
- Kadhalil Vizhunthen (2008)
- Kadhalithal Podhuma (1967)
- Kadhaludan (2003)
- Kadhalukku Mariyadhai (1997)
- Kadhalum Kadandhu Pogum (2016)
- Kadhaveedu (2013)
- Kadikara Manithargal (2018)
- Kadina Benki (1988)
- Kadina Rahasya (1969)
- Kadinjool Kalyanam (1991)
- Kadinte Makkal (1986)
- Kado Kendo (2007)
- Kadosh (1999)
- Kaduvaye Pidicha Kiduva (1977)
- Kadu Makrani (1960)

==== Kae–Kah ====
- Kaena: The Prophecy (2003)
- Kaerazaru hibi (1978)
- Kaettekita Kogarashi Monjirō (1993)
- Kafan (1990)
- Kafi's Story (1989)
- Kafka (1991)
- Kafka au Congo (2010)
- Kafr kasem (1975)
- Kagaar: Life on the Edge (2003)
- Kagbeni (2008)
- Kagemusha (1980)
- Kagen no tsuki (2004)
- Kagojer Bou (2011)
- Kagojer Nouka (2013)
- Kagojer Phul (TBD)
- Kaguya-sama: Love Is War (2019)
- Kahaani (2012)
- Kahaani 2: Durga Rani Singh (2016)
- Kahan Hai Kanoon (1989)
- Kahani Ek Chor Ki (1981)
- Kahani Hum Sab Ki (1973)
- Kahani Kismat Ki: (1973 & 1999)
- Kahe Gaye Pardes Piya (2009)
- Kahin Aur Chal (1968)
- Kahin Chand Na Sharma Jaye (2013 TV)
- Kahin Hai Mera Pyar (2014)
- Kahin Pyaar Na Ho Jaaye (2000)
- Kahit Demonyo Itutumba Ko (2000)
- Kahl (1961)
- Kaho Naa... Pyaar Hai (2000)
- Kahpe Bizans (2000)
- Kahte Hain Mujhko Raja (1975)
- Kahvalhah Dhaandhen (2002)

==== Kai ====
- Kai Kodukkum Kai (1984)
- Kai Koduttha Dheivam (1964)
- Kai Naattu (1988)
- Kai Po Che! (2013)
- Kai Rabe gegen die Vatikankiller (1998)
- Kai Veesamma Kai Veesu (1989)
- Kaidan (2007)
- Kaidan Kasane-ga-fuchi (1957)
- Kaidan Shin Mimibukuro: Yūrei Mansion (2005)
- Kaiju funsen–Daigoro tai Goriasu (1972)
- Kaikeyi (1983)
- Kaikudunna Nilavu (1998)
- Kailan Ka Magiging Akin (1991)
- Kailan Sasabihing Mahal Kita (1985)
- Kailangan Kita (2002)
- Kailangan Ko'y Ikaw (2000)
- Kailashey Kelenkari (2007)
- Kaili Blues (2015)
- Kaip Pavogti Žmoną (2013)
- Kaise Kahoon Ke... Pyaar Hai (2003)
- The Kaiser, the Beast of Berlin (1918)
- The Kaiser's Shadow (1918)
- Kaiserjäger (1956)
- Kaisha monogatari: Memories of You (1988)
- Kaithappoo (1978)
- Kaithi: (1951 & 2019)
- Kaithi Kannayiram (1960)
- Kaithiyin Kathali (1963)
- Kaivantha Kalai (2006)
- Kaiwara Mahathme (1961)
- Kaiyethum Doorath (2002)
- Kaiyoppu (2007)
- Kaiyum Thlayum Purathidaruthe (1985)
- Kaizoku Sentai Gokaiger the Movie: The Flying Ghost Ship (2011)
- Kaizoku Sentai Gokaiger vs. Space Sheriff Gavan: The Movie (2012)
- Kaizokuban Bootleg Film (1999)

==== Kaj–Kak ====
- Kajaki (2014)
- Kajarya (2015)
- Kajillionaire (2020)
- Kajraare (2010)
- Kaka Ji (2019)
- Kakababu Here Gelen? (1995)
- Kakabakaba Ka Ba? (1980)
- Kakegurui – Compulsive Gambler (2019)
- Kakekomi (2015)
- Kaki Kitai (2014)
- Kakka (1982)
- Kakkai Siraginilae (2000)
- Kakkakuyil (2001)
- Kakkathamburatti (1970)
- Kakkathollayiram (1991)
- Kakki Sattai (2015)
- Kakkoos (2017)
- Kakkothikkavile Appooppan Thaadikal (1988)
- Kaks' tavallista Lahtista (1960)
- Kakshi: Amminippilla (2019)
- Kakushi Toride no San-Akunin: The Last Princess (2008)

==== Kal ====
- Kal Aaj Aur Kal (1971)
- Kal Ho Naa Ho (2003)
- Kal Kissne Dekha (2009)
- Kal Manja (2011)
- Kal: Yesterday and Tomorrow (2005)
- Kala Dhanda Goray Log (1986)
- Kala Malam Bulan Mengambang (2008)
- Kala Pani (1958)
- Kala Shah Kala (2019)
- Kala Suraj (1985)
- Kala Viplavam Pranayam (2018)
- Kalaakaar (1983)
- Kalaavida (1949)
- Kalaayaanulaa (2003)
- Kalabha Kadhalan (2006)
- Kalabha Mazha (2011)
- Kalachakram (1973)
- Kalakalappu: (2001 & 2012)
- Kalakalappu 2 (2018)
- Kalakkura Chandru (2007)
- Kalamasseriyil Kalyanayogam (1995)
- Kalamity (2010)
- Kalangarai Vilakkam (1965)
- Kalanjukittiya Thankam (1964)
- Kalankini Kankabati (1981)
- Kalari (2018)
- Kalari Vikraman (2003)
- Kalasi Vunte Kaladu Sukham (1961)
- Kalasipalya (2004)
- Kalat Nakalat (1989)
- Kalathur Gramam (2017)
- Kalathur Kannamma (1960)
- Kalatpadai (2003)
- Kalava (1932)
- Kalavaadiya Pozhuthugal (2017)
- Kalavani (2010)
- Kalavani 2 (2019)
- Kalavani Mappillai (2018)
- Kalavantin (1978)
- Kalavar King (2010)
- Kalavaram (2014)
- Kalavaramaye Madilo (2009)
- Kalavari Kodalu (1964)
- Kalavari Samsaram (1982)
- Kalavathi (1951)
- Kalavida (1997)
- Kalavu: (2013 & 2019)
- Kalavu Thozhirchalai (2017)
- Kalay Chor (1991)
- Kalaya Tasmai Namaha (2012)
- Kalayum Kaminiyum (1963)
- Kaleidoscope: (1966, 1990 & 2016)
- The Kalemites Visit Gibraltar (1912)
- Kali Ganga (1990)
- Kali Ghata: (1951 & 1980)
- Kali the Little Vampire (2012)
- Kalicharan: (1976 & 1988)
- Kalidas (1931)
- Kalifornia (1993)
- Kalika (1980)
- Kalikaalam: (1992 & 2012)
- Kalikalam (1991)
- Kalikkalam (1990)
- Kalinga (2006)
- Kalinka (2016)
- Kalippattam (1993)
- Kalippava (1972)
- Kaliveedu (1996)
- Kaliya Mardan (1919)
- Kaliyalla Kalyanam (1968)
- Kaliyattam (1997)
- Kaliyil Alpam Karyam (1984)
- Kaliyodam (1965)
- Kaliyoonjal (1997)
- Kaliyuga Bheema (1991)
- Kaliyuga Kannan (1974)
- Kaliyuga Krishnudu (1986)
- Kaliyuga Pandavulu (1986)
- Kaliyuga Ramudu (1982)
- Kaliyuga Seethe (1992)
- Kalki: (1984, 1996 & 2019 Malayalam & 2019 Telugu)
- Kalla Kulla (1975)
- Kalla Malla Sulla (2011)
- Kallai FM (2018)
- Kallan Kappalil Thanne (1992)
- Kallan Pavithran (1981)
- Kallang Roar the Movie (2008)
- Kallappadam (2015)
- Kallarali Hoovagi (2006)
- Kallattam (2016)
- Kallipennu (1966)
- Kalliyankattu Neeli (1979)
- Kalloori (2007)
- Kalloori Vaasal (1996)
- Kallu (1988)
- Kallu Kondoru Pennu (1998)
- Kallu Sakkare (1967)
- Kallukkul Eeram (1980)
- Kallum Kaniyagum (1968)
- Kalluveene Nudiyithu (1983)
- Kalos ilthe to dollario (1967)
- Kaloyan (1963)
- Kalpana: (1948, 1960, 1970 & 2012)
- Kalpana 2 (2016)
- Kalyana Agathigal (1985)
- Kalyana Galatta (1998)
- Kalyana Kacheri (1997)
- Kalyana Kalam (1982)
- Kalyana Kurimanam (2005)
- Kalyaanappanthal (1975)
- Kalyanam (2018)
- Kalyani: (1940, 1952, 1971 & 1979)
- Kalyanikku Kalyanam (1959)
- Kalyaniyin Kanavan (1963)
- Kalyanji Anandji (1995)

==== Kam ====
- Kam slunce nechodí (1971)
- Kama Sutra: A Tale of Love (1997)
- Kamaal Dhamaal Malamaal (2012)
- Kamagni (1987)
- Kamagong (1987)
- Kambakht (TBD)
- Kambakkht Ishq (2009)
- Kambal Na Kamao: Madugong Engkwentro (1988)
- Kambal Tuko (1988)
- Kamachi (2004)
- Kamadhenu (1941)
- Kamagni (1987)
- Kamakalawa (1981)
- Kamala (2019)
- Kamaladalam (1992)
- Kamalatho Naa Prayanam (2013)
- Kamali from Nadukkaveri (2021)
- Kamalolmolk (1984)
- Kamandag ng Droga (2017)
- Kamara's Tree (2013)
- Kamaraj (2004)
- Kamarasu (2002)
- Kamasutra 3D (2013)
- Kamay ni Cain (1957)
- Kambakht (TBD)
- Kambakkht Ishq (2009)
- Kambal Na Kamao: Madugong Engkwentro (1988)
- Kambhoji (2017)
- Kambili: The Whole 30 Yards (2020)
- Kamchatka (2002)
- Kameleon 2 (2005)
- Kamen Rider series:
  - Kamen Rider ZO (1993)
  - Kamen Rider J (1994)
  - Kamen Rider World (1994)
  - Kamen Rider Ryuki: Episode Final (2002)
  - Kamen Rider 555: Paradise Lost (2003)
  - Kamen Rider Blade: Missing Ace (2004)
  - Kamen Rider Hibiki & The Seven Senki (2005)
  - Kamen Rider: The First (2005)
  - Kamen Rider Kabuto: God Speed Love (2006)
  - Kamen Rider Den-O: I'm Born! (2007)
  - Kamen Rider: The Next (2007)
  - Kamen Rider Den-O & Kiva: Climax Deka (2008)
  - Kamen Rider Kiva: King of the Castle in the Demon World (2008)
  - Saraba Kamen Rider Den-O: Final Countdown (2008)
  - Cho Kamen Rider Den-O & Decade Neo Generations: The Onigashima Warship (2009)
  - Kamen Rider Decade: All Riders vs. Dai-Shocker (2009)
  - Kamen Rider × Kamen Rider W & Decade: Movie War 2010 (2009)
  - Kamen Rider W Forever: A to Z/The Gaia Memories of Fate (2010)
  - Kamen Rider × Kamen Rider OOO & W Featuring Skull: Movie War Core (2010)
  - OOO, Den-O, All Riders: Let's Go Kamen Riders (2011)
  - Kamen Rider OOO Wonderful: The Shogun and the 21 Core Medals (2011)
  - Kamen Rider × Kamen Rider Fourze & OOO: Movie War Mega Max (2011)
  - Kamen Rider × Super Sentai: Super Hero Taisen (2012)
  - Kamen Rider Fourze the Movie: Space, Here We Come! (2012)
  - Kamen Rider × Kamen Rider Wizard & Fourze: Movie War Ultimatum (2012)
  - Kamen Rider × Super Sentai × Space Sheriff: Super Hero Taisen Z (2013)
  - Kamen Rider Wizard in Magic Land (2013)
  - Kamen Rider × Kamen Rider Gaim & Wizard: The Fateful Sengoku Movie Battle (2013)
  - Heisei Riders vs. Shōwa Riders: Kamen Rider Taisen feat. Super Sentai (2014)
  - Kamen Rider Gaim: Great Soccer Battle! Golden Fruits Cup! (2014)
  - Kamen Rider × Kamen Rider Drive & Gaim: Movie War Full Throttle (2014)
  - Super Hero Taisen GP: Kamen Rider 3 (2015)
  - Kamen Rider Drive: Surprise Future (2015)
  - Kamen Rider × Kamen Rider Ghost & Drive: Super Movie War Genesis (2015)
  - Kamen Rider 1 (2016)
  - Kamen Rider Ghost: The 100 Eyecons and Ghost's Fated Moment (2016)
  - Kamen Rider Heisei Generations Final: Build & Ex-Aid with Legend Rider (2017)
  - Kamen Rider Ex-Aid the Movie: True Ending (2017)
  - Kamen Rider Amazons the Movie: The Last Judgement (2018)
  - Kamen Rider Build the Movie: Be the One (2018)
  - Kamen Rider Heisei Generations Forever (2018)
  - Kamen Rider Zi-O the Movie: Over Quartzer (2019)
  - Kamen Rider Reiwa The First Generation (2019)
  - Kamen Rider Zero-One the Movie: Real×Time (2020)
  - Shin Kamen Rider (2023)
- Kamera Obskura (2012)
- Kameradschaft (1931)
- Kami: (1982 & 2008)
- Kamihate Store (2012)
- Kamikaze (1986)
- Kamikaze 1989 (1982)
- Kamikaze Man: Duel at Noon (1966)
- Kamikaze Taxi (1995)
- Kamikazen: Last Night in Milan (1987)
- Kamilla and the Thief (1988)
- Kamilla and the Thief II (1989)
- Kamillions (1989)
- Kaminey (2009)
- Kamini (1974)
- Kamisama no Karute (2011)
- Kamisama no Karute 2 (2014)
- Kamla (1984)
- Kamla Ki Maut (1989)
- Kamli: (2006 & 2022)
- Kammara Sambhavam (2018)
- Kammatipaadam (2016)
- Kamome Shokudo (2006)
- Kamouraska (1973)
- Kampen mod uretten (1949)
- Kampen om Næsbygård (1964)
- Kampf um Norwegen – Feldzug 1940 (1940)
- Kampf um Rom (1968–69)
- Kamsale Kaisale (2012)
- Kamsin: The Untouched (1997)
- Kamui Gaiden (2009)
- Kamuki (2018)
- Kamulah Satu-Satunya (2007)
- Kamyabi (1984)

==== Kan ====
- Kan du vissla Johanna? (1994 TV)
- Kan Kanda Deivam (1967)
- Kan Pesum Vaarthaigal (2013)
- Kan Simittum Neram (1988)
- Kan Thiranthathu (1959)
- Kana Kandaen (2005)
- Kana Kanmani (2009)
- Kanaa (2018)
- Kanagavel Kaaka (2010)
- Kanaka (2018)
- Kanaka Simhasanam (2007)
- Kanakachilanga (1966)
- Kanakambarangal (1988)
- Kanakompathu (2011)
- Kanal (2015)
- Kanał (1956)
- Kanalizasyon (2009)
- Kanalkattakal (1978)
- Kanalkkattu (1991)
- Kanalukku Karaiyethu (1982)
- Kanamachi (2013)
- Kanamarayathu (1984)
- Kanana Sundari (1988)
- Kanasemba Kudureyaneri (2010)
- Kanashii kibun de joke (1985)
- Kanasina Rani (1992)
- Kanasugara (2001)
- Kanavan (1968)
- Kanavan Manaivi (1976)
- Kanavaney Kankanda Deivam (1955)
- Kanave Kalaiyadhe (1999)
- Kanavu (1954)
- Kanavu Meippada Vendum (2004)
- Kanavu Variyam (2017)
- Kanavugal Karpanaigal (1982)
- Kanchana (1952)
- Kanchana 2 (2015)
- Kanchana 3 (2019)
- Kanchenjungha (1962)
- Kancher Deyal (1963)
- Kanchhi (1984)
- KanColle: The Movie (2016)
- Kandahar (2001)
- Kan'du Ibilees (2018)
- Kandukondain Kandukondain (2000)
- Una Kang Naging Akin (1991)
- Kangaroo: (1952, 1986, 2007, 2015 & 2025)
- Kangaroo Island (2024)
- Kangaroo Jack (2003)
- Kangaroo Jack: G'Day U.S.A.! (2004)
- The Kangaroo Kid (1950)
- Kangaroo Palace (1997) (TV)
- Kangaroo: A Love-Hate Story (2017)
- Kanggeonneo maeul (1935)
- Kannathil Muthamittal (2002)
- The Kansan (1943)
- Kansas (1988)
- Kansas City (1996)
- Kansas City Bomber (1972)
- Kansas City Confidential (1952)
- Kansas City Kitty (1944)
- The Kansas City Massacre (1975 TV)
- Kansas City Princess (1934)
- Kansas Cyclone (1941)
- Kansas Pacific (1953)
- Kansas Raiders (1950)
- Kansas Saloon Smashers (1901)
- The Kansas Terrors (1939)
- Kantara (2022)

==== Kao–Kap ====
- Kaos (1984)
- Kapaemahu (2020)
- Kapag Puno Na ang Salop (1987)
- Kapag Tumibok Ang Puso: Not Once, But Twice (2006)
- Kapalkundala (1933)
- Kapantay ay Langit (1994)
- Kapitäne bleiben an Bord (1959)
- Kapitein Rob en het Geheim van Professor Lupardi (2007)
- Kapo: (1960 & 2000)
- Kapoor & Sons (2016)
- Kappal (2014)
- Kappal Muthalaali (2009)
- Kappalottiya Thamizhan (1961)
- Kappiri Thuruthu (2016)
- Kappu Bilupu (1969)
- Kaptaan (2016)
- Kapurush (1965)
- Kapus Kondyachi Goshta (2014)
- Kaputt Mundi (1998)
- Kapyong (2011)

==== Kar ====
- Kara Murat Şeyh Gaffar'a Karşı (1976)
- Karaar (2017)
- Karachi Lahore series:
  - Karachi Se Lahore (2015)
  - Lahore Se Aagey (2016)
- Karado: The Kung Fu Flash (1973)
- Karafuto 1945 Summer Hyosetsu no Mon (1974)
- Karagattakaran (1989)
- Karaikkal Ammaiyar: (1943 & 1973)
- Karaiyellam Shenbagapoo (1981)
- Karajan: The Maestro and His Festival (2017)
- Karakanakadal (1971)
- Karakolda Ayna Var (1966)
- Karakum (1994)
- Karam (2005)
- Karam Dosa (2016)
- Karama Has No Walls (2012)
- Karamay (2010)
- The Karamazovs (2008)
- Karamoja (1954)
- Karan Arjun (1995)
- Karanji (2009)
- Karaoke (2009)
- Karaoke Crazies (2016)
- Karar: The Deal (2014)
- Karate (1983)
- Karate Bearfighter (1975)
- Karate Cop (1991)
- The Karate Dog (2004 TV)
- Karate Girl (2011)
- The Karate Guard (2005)
- Karate Kiba (1973)
- The Karate Kid series:
  - The Karate Kid: (1984 & 2010)
  - The Karate Kid Part II (1986)
  - The Karate Kid Part III (1989)
  - The Next Karate Kid (1994)
  - Karate Kid: Legends (2025)
- The Karate Killers (1967)
- Karate for Life (1977)
- Karate Warrior (1987)
- Karate Warriors (1976)
- Karate-Robo Zaborgar (2011)
- Karateci Kız (1973)
- Karavan Lyubvi (1991 TV)
- Karayilekku Oru Kadal Dooram (2010)
- Karayuki-san, the Making of a Prostitute (1975)
- Karbala (2015)
- Kardec (2019)
- Kardia (2006)
- Kareeb (1998)
- Karel Havlíček Borovský (1925)
- Karel, Me and You (2019)
- Karem the Possession (2021)
- Karen (2021)
- The Karen Carpenter Story (1989 TV)
- Kargus (1981)
- Karie (2015)
- Karin Månsdotter (1954)
- Karin's Face (1984)
- Karina the Dancer (1928)
- Karinkunnam 6's (2016)
- Kariya (2003)
- Kariya 2 (2017)
- Kariyilakkattu Pole (1986)
- Karl Liebknecht – Solange Leben in mir ist (1965)
- Karl Liebknecht – Trotz alledem! (1972)
- Karmic Mahjong (2006)
- The Karnival Kid (1929)
- Kart Racer (2003)
- The Karthauzer (1916)
- Karthikeya (2014)
- Karthikeya 2 (2022)
- Karu süda (2001)
- Karujaht Pärnumaal (1914)
- Karz (1980)
- Karzzzz (2008)

==== Kas ====
- Kasaba: (1997 & 2016)
- Kasak: (1992 & 2005)
- Kasal: (2014 & 2018)
- Kasal, Kasali, Kasalo (2006)
- Kasalanan Bang Sambahin Ka? (1990)
- Kasam: (1993 & 2001)
- Kasam Paida Karne Wale Ki (1984)
- Kasam Suhaag Ki (1989)
- Kasam Vardi Ki (1989)
- Kasarkode Khaderbai (1992)
- Kasauti: (1941 & 1974)
- Kasavuthattam (1967)
- Kasba (1991)
- Kasethan Kadavulada: (1972 & 2011)
- Kash Aap Hamare Hote (2003)
- Kashchey the Immortal (1945)
- Kashmakash (1973)
- Kashmeeram (1994)
- Kashmir Daily (2017)
- The Kashmir Files (2022)
- Kashmir Ki Kali (1964)
- Kashmora (1986)
- Kasi (2001)
- Kasi Yathirai (1973)
- Kasidre Kailasa (1971)
- Kasimedu Govindan (2008)
- Kasme Vaade (1978)
- Kasoor (2001)
- Kassbach – Ein Porträt (1979)
- Kassettenliebe (1981)
- Kasthooriman (2003)
- Kasthuri Maan (2005)
- Kasturi (1980)
- Kasturi Nivasa (1971)
- Kasturi Thilakam (1970)
- Kastus Kalinovskiy (1928)
- Kasu Irukkanum (2007)
- Kasum Khoon Ki (1977)

==== Kat ====
- Katakataala Rudraiah (1978)
- Kataksha (2019)
- Katala (1989)
- Katalin Varga (2009)
- Katamarayudu (2017)
- Katanga Business (2009)
- Katari Veera (1966)
- Katari Veera Surasundarangi (2012)
- Katariina ja Munkkiniemen kreivi (1943)
- Katastrofa (1965)
- Katasumi (1998)
- Kate (2021)
- Kate – la bisbetica domata (2004)
- Kate Bliss and the Ticker Tape Kid (1978 TV)
- Kate & Leopold (2001)
- The Kate Logan Affair (2010)
- Kate Plus Ten (1938)
- Kate's Secret (1986 TV)
- Katerina Izmailova (1966)
- Katha: (1983 & 2009)
- Katha Deithili Maa Ku (2004)
- Katha Dilam (1991)
- Katha Ithuvare (1985)
- Katha Karana Heena (2019)
- Katha Kathmandu (2018)
- Kathanayakudu (1969)
- Katia (1938)
- Katie Tippel (1975)
- Katmandú, un espejo en el cielo (2010)
- The Katnips of 1940 (1934)
- Katutu, the Blind (1953)
- Katy Perry: Part of Me (2012)
- Katyń (2007)
- Katze im Sack (2005)
- Katzelmacher (1969)
- Katzgraben (1957)
- Katzhen (2005)

==== Kau–Kav ====
- Kauda Bole Alice (2000)
- Kauda Machan Alice (2014)
- Kauf dir einen bunten Luftballon (1961)
- Kaum De Heere (2014)
- Kaun (1999)
- Kaun Apna Kaun Paraya (1963)
- Kaun Hai Jo Sapno Mein Aaya (2004)
- Kaun Jeeta Kaun Haara (1987)
- Kaun Kare Insaaf (2015)
- Kaun Kare Kurbanie (1991)
- Kaun Kitne Paani Mein (2015)
- Kaun Rokega Mujhe (1997)
- Kaun Sachcha Kaun Jhootha (1997)
- Kausthubham (2010)
- The Kautokeino Rebellion (2008)
- Käuzchenkuhle (1968)
- Kavacha (2019)
- Kavacham: (1992 & 2018)
- Kavadiyattam (1993)
- Kavalai Illaadha Manithan (1960)
- Kavalai Padathe Sagodhara (1998)
- Kavalai Vendam (2016)
- Kavalam Chundan (1967)
- Kavalan Avan Kovalan (1987)
- Kavaleredu Kulavandu (1964)
- Kavalukku Kettikaran (1990)
- Kavan (2017)
- Kaveri: (1955, 1975 & 1986)
- Kavi Uddheshichathu..? (2016)
- Kaviyam (1994)
- Kavya (1995)
- Kavya's Diary (2009)

==== Kaw–Kaz ====
- Kaw (2007)
- Kawa (2010)
- Kawasaki's Rose (2009)
- Kawashima Yoshiko (1990)
- Kay Tagal Kang Hinitay (1998)
- Kaya (1967)
- Kayal (2014)
- Kayalkkarayil (1968)
- Kayalum Kayarum (1979)
- Kayam: (1982 & 2011)
- Kayamkulam Kochunni: (1966 & 2018)
- Kayan Beauties (2012)
- Kayda Kanoon (1993)
- Kaydyacha Bola (2005)
- Kazaam (1996)
- Kazablan (1974)
- Kazan (1921)
- Każdemu wolno kochać (1933)
- Kaze, Ghost Warrior (2004)
- Kaze, Slow Down (1991)
- Kaze ni Tatsu Lion (2015)
- Kazhakam (1996)
- Kazhugu: (1981 & 2012)
- Kazhugu 2 (2019)
- Kazhugumalai Kallan (1988)
- Kazhukan (1979)
- Kazhumaram (1982)
- Kazimierz Wielki (1975)
- Kazoku (1970)

=== Kd ===
- Kdybych byl tátou (1939)
- Když rozvod, tak rozvod (1982)
- Když struny lkají (1930)

=== Ke ===
- Ke Tumi (2008)

==== Kea–Kee ====
- Kean: (1921, 1924 & 1940)
- Kean: Genius or Scoundrel (1956)
- Keane (2005)
- Keane of Kalgoorlie (1911)
- Keanu (2016)
- Keaton's Cop (1990)
- Keats and His Nightingale: A Blind Date (1985)
- Kebab Connection (2005)
- Kebabaluba (1995)
- Kebe Tume Nahan Kebe Mu Nahin (2012)
- Kedarnath (2018)
- Kedi: (2006, 2010 & 2016)
- Kedi Billa Killadi Ranga (2013)
- Kedma (2002)
- Kedok Ketawa (1940)
- Kee (2019)
- Kee en Janus naar Berlijn (1923)
- Kee en Janus naar Parijs (1924)
- Keechaka Vadham (c. 1917)
- Keelu Bommalu (1965)
- Keelu Gurram (1949)
- Keemat: (1946 & 1973)
- Keemat – They Are Back (1998)
- Keen as Mustard (1989)
- The Keep (1983)
- Keep 'Em Flying (1941)
- Keep 'Em Rolling (1934)
- Keep 'Em Slugging (1943)
- Keep Away from the Window (2000)
- Keep Calm and Be a Superstar (2018)
- Keep Cool (1997)
- Keep an Eye Out (2018)
- Keep Fit (1937)
- Keep It in the Family (1973)
- Keep It Up, Jack (1973)
- Keep Laughing (1932)
- Keep Not Silent (2002)
- Keep Quiet (2016)
- Keeper: (2015 & 2025)
- The Keeper: (1976, 2004, 2009 & 2018)
- The Keeper: The Legend of Omar Khayyam (2005)
- The Keeper of the Bees: (1925 & 1935)
- Keeper of Darkness (2015)
- The Keeper of Lost Causes (2013)
- Keeper of Promises (1962)
- Keeping the Faith (2000)
- The Keeping Hours (2017)
- Keeping Mum (2005)
- Keeping the Promise (1997 TV)
- The Keeping Room (2014)
- Keerthi Chakra (2006)
- Keetje Tippel (1975)

==== Keh–Kem ====
- Kehtaa Hai Dil Baar Baar (2002)
- Keiko (1979)
- Keiko: The Untold Story (2010)
- Kein Mann zum Heiraten (1959)
- Keiron: The First Voyager (1995)
- Keisatsu Nikki (1955)
- Keïta! l'Héritage du griot (1995)
- Keith (2008)
- Keith Lemon: The Film (2012)
- Kekec (1951)
- Kekec's Tricks (1968)
- Kekexili: Mountain Patrol (2004)
- Kékszakállú (2016)
- Keladi Kanmani (1990)
- Keli (1991)
- Kelkkaatha Sabdham (1982)
- Kelly (1981 TV)
- Kelly & Cal (2014)
- The Kelly Gang (1920)
- Kelly and Me (1957)
- Kelly the Second (1936)
- Kelly of the Secret Service (1936)
- Kelly + Victor (2012)
- Kelly's Heroes (1970)
- The Kellys of Tobruk (unreleased)
- Kelor Kirti (2016)
- Kelviyum Naane Pathilum Naane (1982)
- Kempe Gowda (2011)
- Kemper: The CoEd Killer (2008)

==== Ken–Kep ====
- Ken (1964)
- Ken Park (2002)
- Kencho Khunrte Keute (1995)
- Kencho Khurte Keute (2014)
- Kène ya ma kène... (2010)
- Keni (1982)
- Kenji Comes Home (1949)
- Kenji Mizoguchi: The Life of a Film Director (1975)
- The Kennel Murder Case (1933)
- Kenner (1969)
- Kenny: (1988 & 2006)
- Kenny & Company (1976)
- Kenpei to Barabara Shibijin (1957)
- Kenpei to Yurei (1958)
- The Kentuckian (1955)
- The Kentuckians (1921)
- Kentucky (1938)
- Kentucky Blue Streak (1935)
- Kentucky Days (1923)
- The Kentucky Derby (1922)
- The Kentucky Fried Movie (1977)
- Kentucky Handicap (1926)
- Kentucky Jubilee (1951)
- Kentucky Kernels (1934)
- Kentucky Minstrels (1934)
- Kentucky Moonshine (1938)
- Kentucky Pride (1925)
- Kentucky Rifle (1955)
- Kentucky Woman (1983 TV)
- Keo Pneik Somnob Jet (2008)
- Keoma (1976)
- Kept and Dreamless (2005)
- Kept Husbands (1931)
- Kept Man (2014)

==== Ker–Key ====
- Kerala House Udan Vilpanakku (2004)
- Kerala Kesari (1951)
- Kerala Varma Pazhassi Raja (2009)
- Keralida Simha (1981)
- Keralotsavam 2009 (2009)
- Kerd ma lui (2004)
- Kereta Hantu Manggarai (2008)
- Kerim, Son of the Sheik (1962)
- The Kerry Gow (1912)
- Kes (1969)
- Kesari (2019)
- Kesarina Kamala (1973)
- Keshava (2017)
- Keshin (1986)
- The Ketchup Effect (2004)
- Keto and Kote (1948)
- Kettévált mennyezet (1981)
- Ketti Melam (1985)
- Kettle of Fish (2006)
- The Kettles in the Ozarks (1956)
- The Kettles on Old MacDonald's Farm (1957)
- Kevade (1969)
- Kevi Rite Jaish (2012)
- Kevin of the North (2001)
- Kevin & Perry Go Large (2000)
- Kevvu Keka (2013)
- Key (2011)
- The Key: (1934, 1958, 1961, 1965, 1971, 1983, 2007 & 2014)
- Key to the City (1950)
- Key Exchange (1985)
- Key to Harmony (1935)
- Key Largo (1948)
- Key of Life (2012)
- The Key Man: (1957 & 2011)
- The Key to Paradise (1970)
- The Key to Reserva (2007)
- Key West (1973)
- Key Witness: (1947 & 1960)
- The Key of the World (1918)
- Keyamat Theke Keyamat (1993)
- Keye Luke (2012)
- Keyhole (2012)
- The Keyhole (1933)
- Keys to the Heart (2018)
- The Keys to the House (2004)
- The Keys of the Kingdom (1944)
- Keys to Tulsa (1997)
- Keystone Hotel (1935)

=== Kh ===
==== Kha ====
- Khaad (2014)
- Khaan Dost (1976)
- Khabardar (2006)
- Khaddama (2011)
- Khadeeja (1967)
- Khadeema Kallaru (1982)
- Khadgam (2002)
- Khaidi: (1983 & 1984)
- Khaidi Kannaiah (1962)
- Khaidi No. 150 (2017)
- Khaidi No. 786 (1988)
- Khajoor Pe Atke (2018)
- Khal-Naaikaa (1993)
- Khaled (2001)
- Khalifa (1976)
- Khalifah (2011)
- Khamma Mara Veera (1976)
- Khamosh (1985)
- Khamosh Nigahen: (1946 & 1986)
- Khamosh Pani (2003)
- Khamosh Raho (2011)
- Khamoshh... Khauff Ki Raat (2005)
- Khamoshi: (1970 & 2019)
- Khamoshi: The Musical (1996)
- Khamoshiyan (2015)
- Khamsa (2008)
- Khan Bahadur (1937)
- Khan Kluay (2006)
- Khan Kluay 2 (2009)
- Khana Baraha (1981)
- Khandaan (1979)
- Khandan: (1942 & 1965)
- Khandavideko Mamsavideko (1979)
- Khandhar (1984)
- Khangri: The Mountain (1996)
- Khanjar (1980)
- Khao Chon Kai (2006)
- Khap (2011)
- Khara Kadhi Bolu Naye (1987)
- Kharms (2017)
- Khartoum (1966)
- Khatra (1991)
- Khatron Ke Khiladi: (1988 & 2001)
- Khasi Katha– A Goat Saga (2013)
- Khatta Meetha: (1978 & 2010)
- Khauff (2000)
- Khazana (1987)
- Khazanchi: (1941 & 1958)
- Khazanchi Ki Beti (1943)

==== Khe–Kho ====
- Khel (1992)
- Khel Khel Mein (1975)
- Khel Khilari Ka (1977)
- Khel Mandala (2012)
- Khel Mohabbat Ka (1986)
- Khel – No Ordinary Game (2003)
- Khel Toh Ab Shuru Hoga (2016)
- Khela (2008)
- Khelein Hum Jee Jaan Sey (2010)
- Khichdi: The Movie (2010)
- Khilaaf (1991)
- Khiladi: (1968, 1992, 2013 & 2016)
- Khiladi 420 (2000)
- Khiladi 786 (2012)
- Khiladiyon Ka Khiladi (1996)
- Khilona: (1942 & 1970)
- Khodar Pore Ma (2012)
- Khoey Ho Tum Kahan (2001)
- Khoj: (1971, 1989 & 2017)
- Khoj: The Search (2010)
- Khoka 420 (2013)
- Khokababu (2012)
- Khokababur Pratyabartan (1960)
- Khola Hawa (2014)
- Khoobsurat: (1999 & 2014)
- Khoon Aur Paani (1981)
- Khoon Bhari Maang (1988)
- Khoon Ka Badla Khoon (1978)
- Khoon Ka Karz (1991)
- Khoon Ka Khoon (1935)
- Khoon Ka Rishta (1981)
- Khoon Khoon (1973)
- Khooni (1946)
- Khooni Bistar (2002)
- Khooni Darinda (1987)
- Khooni Ilaaka:The Prohibited Area (1999)
- Khooni Katar (1931)
- Khooni Khanjar (1930)
- Khooni Laash (1943)
- Khooni Murda (1989)
- Khooni Panja (1991)
- Khooni Raat (1991)
- Khooni Shikanja (2000)
- Khooni Tantrik (2001)
- Khoonkar Darinde (1999)
- Khopdi: The Skull (1999)
- Khosla Ka Ghosla (2006)
- Khouya (2010)
- Khovanshchina (1959)
- Khoya Khoya Chand (2007)

==== Khr–Khy ====
- Khrustalyov, My Car! (1998)
- Khubsoorat (1980)
- Khuda Gawah (1992)
- Khuda Kasam: (1981 & 2010)
- Khuda Kay Liye (2007)
- Khuddar: (1985 & 1994)
- Khudgarz (1987)
- Khulay Aasman Ke Neechay (2008)
- Khuli Khidki (1989)
- Khullam Khulla Pyaar Karen (2005)
- Khulood (1948)
- Khurafat: Perjanjian Syaitan (2011)
- Khush (1991)
- Khush Naseeb (1946)
- Khushboo: (1975 & 2008)
- Khushi: (2003 Hindi & 2003 Kannada)
- Khushi Khushiyagi (2015)
- Khwaabb (2014)
- Khyanikaa: The Lost Idea (2017)

=== Ki ===
- Ki Jadu Korila (2008)
- Ki Je Kori (1976)
- Ki & Ka (2016)
- Ki Kore Bojhabo Tomake (2012)
- Ki Kore Toke Bolbo (2016)

==== Kib–Kic ====
- Kiangnan 1894 (2019)
- Kibbutz (2005)
- Kibera Kid (2006)
- The Kibitzer (1930)
- Kiccha (2003)
- Kiccha Huccha (2010)
- Kicha Vayasu 16 (2005)
- Kichhhu Sanlap Kichhu Pralap (1999)
- Kichiku Dai Enkai (1997)
- Kick: (1999, 2009 & 2014)
- Kick 2 (2015)
- The Kick (2011)
- Kick-Ass series:
  - Kick-Ass (2010)
  - Kick-Ass 2 (2013)
- Kick Ball (2015)
- Kick-Heart (2013)
- Kick In: (1917, 1922 & 1931)
- Kick in Iran (2010)
- Kick Me (1975)
- Kick the Moon (2001)
- Kickaroo (1921)
- The Kickback (1922)
- Kickboxer series:
  - Kickboxer (1989)
  - Kickboxer 2 (1991)
  - Kickboxer 3 (1992)
  - Kickboxer 4 (1994)
  - Kickboxer 5 (1995)
  - Kickboxer: Vengeance (2016)
  - Kickboxer: Retaliation (2018)
- Kickboxing Academy (1997)
- Kicked in the Head (1997)
- Kicked Out (1918)
- Kickin' the Crown Around (1933)
- Kickin' It Old Skool (2007)
- Kicking the Germ Out of Germany (1918)
- Kicking It (2008)
- Kicking the Moon Around (1938)
- Kicking Out Shoshana (2014)
- Kicking and Screaming: (1995 & 2005)
- Kicks (2016)

==== Kid ====
- Kid: (1990 & 2012)
- A Kid (2016)
- The Kid: (1910, 1921, 1950, 1999, 2000, 2010 & 2019)
- The Kid with the 200 I.Q. (1983)
- Kid Auto Races at Venice (1914)
- The Kid from the Big Apple (2016)
- The Kid with a Bike (2011)
- Kid Blue (1973)
- Kid Boots (1926)
- The Kid from Borneo (1933)
- The Kid from Broken Gun (1952)
- The Kid with the Broken Halo (1982)
- The Kid from Brooklyn (1946)
- The Kid Brother (1927)
- Kid Candidate (2021)
- Kid Cannabis (2014)
- The Kid from Cleveland (1949)
- The Kid Comes Back (1938)
- Kid Cop (1993)
- The Kid and the Cowboy (1919)
- The Kid Detective (2020)
- Kid Dynamite (1943)
- Kid Galahad: (1937 & 1962)
- Kid Gang on the Go (1971)
- Kid Glove Killer (1942)
- Kid Gloves (1929)
- Kid with the Golden Arm (1979)
- The Kid & I (2005)
- The Kid from Kansas (1941)
- A Kid in King Arthur's Court (1995)
- A Kid in Aladdin's Palace (1997)
- The Kid from Kokomo (1939)
- Kid Kulafu (2015)
- The Kid from Left Field: (1953 & 1979)
- Kid Millions (1934)
- Kid Monk Baroni (1952)
- Kid Nightingale (1939)
- The Kid Rides Again (1943)
- Kid Rodelo (1966)
- Kid Safe: The Video (1988)
- The Kid Sister (1945)
- Kid Snow (2024)
- The Kid from Spain (1932)
- Kid Speed (1924)
- The Kid Stakes (1927)
- The Kid Stays in the Picture (2002)
- The Kid from Texas: (1939 & 1950)
- A Kid for Two Farthings (1955)
- The Kid Who Couldn't Miss (1983)
- The Kid Who Would Be King (2019)
- Kida Poosari Magudi (2016)
- Kidaari (2016)
- Kidappadam (1955)
- Kidco (1984)
- Kidder & Ko (1918)
- Kiddie Kure (1940)
- Kiddie League (1959)
- The Kiddies in the Ruins (1918)
- Kidi (2017)
- Kidnap: (1974, 2008, 2017 & 2019)
- Kidnap Capital (2015)
- Kidnap Syndicate (1975)
- Kidnapped: (1917, 1935, 1938, 1948, 1960, 1971, 1974, 1986, 1995 TV, 2010) & Kidnapped (2021)
- The Kidnapped Bride (1914)
- Kidnapped in New York (1914)
- Kidnapped to Mystery Island (1964)
- The Kidnapper (1958)
- The Kidnappers (1953)
- Kidnapping Freddy Heineken (2015)
- Kidnapping the Kid (1914)
- The Kidnapping of Lola (1986)
- The Kidnapping of Michel Houellebecq (2014)
- The Kidnapping of the President (1980)
- Kidnapping Stella (2019)
- Kidnapping, Caucasian Style (1967)
- Kidnapping, Caucasian Style! (2014)
- Kids (1995)
- The Kids (2015)
- Kids in America (2005)
- Kids + Money (2008)
- Kids World (2001)
- The Kids Are All Right (2010)
- The Kids Are Alright (1979)
- The Kid's Clever (1929)
- The Kids Grow Up: (1942 & 1976)
- The Kids from the Marx and Engels Street (2014)
- The Kids Menu (2016)
- The Kids from the Port (2013)
- Kids of the Round Table (1995)
- The Kids in the Shoe (1935)
- Kidulthood (2006)

==== Kie–Kik ====
- Kie Kahara (1968)
- Kif Tebbi (1928)
- Kika (1993)
- Kikaider Reboot (2014)
- Kikansha Sensei (2004)
- Kiki: (1926, 1931, 1932 & 2016)
- Kiki, Love to Love (2016)
- Kiki's Delivery Service: (1989 & 2014)
- Kiko Foils the Fox (1936)
- Kiko and the Honey Bears (1936)
- Kikoku (2003)
- Kikoriki. Team Invincible (2011)
- Kikos: (1931 & 1979)
- Kiku to Isamu (1959)
- Kikujiro (2000)

==== Kil–Kim ====
- Kill Bill: Volume 1 (2003)
- Kill Bill: Volume 2 (2004)
- Kill Code (2026)
- Kill a Dragon (1967)
- Kill the Irishman (2011)
- Kill List (2011)
- Kill the Man (1999)
- Kill Me Again (1989)
- Kill Me Later (2001)
- Kill Me Three Times (2016)
- Kill the Poor (2006)
- Kill Switch: (2008 & 2017)
- Kill Them All and Come Back Alone (1968)
- Kill Time (2016)
- Kill the Umpire (1950)
- Kill Your Darlings: (2006 & 2013)
- Kill! (1968)
- Kill, Baby, Kill (1968)
- Killer: (1991 & 1998)
- The Killer: (1953, 1972, 1989, 2006, 2017 & 2023)
- A Killer Among Us (1990 TV)
- Killer Bash (2005)
- Killer Condom (1996)
- Killer Diller: (1948 & 2004)
- The Killer Elite (1975)
- Killer Elite (2011)
- The Killer Inside Me: (1976 & 2010)
- Killer Instinct: (1988 TV & 1992)
- Killer Joe (2011)
- Killer Klowns from Outer Space (1988)
- Killer Meteors (1976)
- Killer Nun (1978)
- The Killer Reserved Nine Seats (1974)
- Killer of Sheep (1978)
- The Killer Shrews (1959)
- Killer Sofa (2019)
- Killer Tattoo (2001)
- Killer: A Journal of Murder (1996)
- Killer Whale (2026)
- The Killer Within (2006)
- The Killer's Game (2024)
- Killer's Kiss (1955)
- Killer's Moon (1978)
- Killers: (2000 TV, 2003, 2010 & 2014)
- The Killers: (1946, 1956 & 1964)
- Killers of the Flower Moon (2023)
- Killers in the House (1998 TV)
- Killers from Space (1954)
- Killers Three (1968)
- Killing (2018)
- The Killing (1956)
- Killing Car (1993)
- The Killing of a Chinese Bookie (1976)
- Killing Faith (2025)
- The Killing Fields (1984)
- The Killing Gene (2007)
- Killing Hasselhoff (2017)
- The Killing Jar (2010)
- Killing Me Softly (2002)
- Killing Mr. Griffin (1997)
- The Killing Room (2009)
- The Killing of a Sacred Deer (2017)
- Killing Season (2013)
- The Killing of Sister George (1968)
- Killing Them Softly (2012)
- Killing Zoe (1994)
- KillRoy Was Here (2022)
- Killshot (2009)
- Kim: (1950 & 1984)
- Kim Possible series:
  - Kim Possible (2019 TV)
  - Kim Possible: A Sitch in Time (2003 TV)
  - Kim Possible Movie: So the Drama (2005 TV)
- Kimi (2022)
- Kimi ni Todoke (2010)
- Kimjongilia (2009)
- Kimmy Dora series:
  - Kimmy Dora: Kambal sa Kiyeme (2009)
  - Kimmy Dora and the Temple of Kiyeme (2012)
  - Kimmy Dora: Ang Kiyemeng Prequel (2013)
- Kimo and his Buddy (2004)
- Kimurake no Hitobito (1988)

==== Kin ====
- Kin (2018)
- Kin-dza-dza! (1986)
- Kin Fables (2013–2015) Canadian film project including three short films
- Kinamand (2005)
- Kinatay (2009)
- Kinavalli (2018)
- Kind Hearts and Coronets (1949)
- A Kind of Loving (1962)
- Kinda Pregnant (2025)
- Kindergarten: (1983 & 1989)
- Kindergarten Cop (1990)
- Kindergarten Cop 2 (2016)
- Kindling (1915)
- Kindred (2020)
- The Kindred (1987)
- Kinds of Kindness (2024)
- Kinetta (2005)
- King: (2002 & 2008)
- The King: (1936, 1995, 2002, 2005, 2007, 2017 Korean, 2017 American & 2019)
- The King – Jari Litmanen (2012)
- King of the Ants (2003)
- King Arthur (2004)
- King Arthur Was a Gentleman (1942)
- King Arthur: Legend of the Sword (2017)
- King Boxer (1972)
- King of California (2007)
- King of the Children (1987)
- King of Chinatown (1939)
- The King and the Clown (2005)
- King Cobra: (1999 & 2016)
- King of Comedy (1999)
- The King of Comedy (1983)
- King and Country (1964)
- King Creole (1958)
- King David (1985)
- King for a Day: (1940 & 1983)
- The King and Four Queens (1956)
- King of Hearts: (1936, 1966 & 1968)
- King of the Hill (1993)
- The King and I: (1956 & 1999)
- The King of Kings: (1927, 1963 & 2025)
- King of Kings (1961)
- King Knight (2021)
- King Kong: (1933, 1976 & 2005)
- King Kong Escapes (1968)
- King Kong vs. Godzilla (1962)
- King Kong Lives (1986)
- The King of Kong: A Fistful of Quarters (2007)
- The King of Marvin Gardens (1972)
- The King of Masks (1996)
- The King and the Mockingbird (1980)
- King of the Mountain (1981)
- The King of the Mountain (2007)
- A King in New York (1957)
- King of New York (1990)
- King Ralph (1991)
- King Rat (1965)
- King Richard (2021)
- King Richard and the Crusaders (1954)
- King Solomon's Mines: (1937, 1950, 1985 & 2004 TV)
- The King of Staten Island (2020)
- King of the Zombies (1941)
- King: A Filmed Record... Montgomery to Memphis (1970)
- The King's Daughter: (1916 & 2022)
- The King's Man (2021)
- King's Ransom (2005)
- The King's Speech (2010)
- A King's Story (1965)
- The Kingdom (2007)
- The Kingdom and the Beauty (1959)
- Kingdom Come: (1919 & 2001)
- The Kingdom of the Fairies (1903)
- Kingdom of Heaven (2005)
- Kingdom of the Planet of the Apes (2024)
- Kingdom of the Spiders (1977)
- Kingpin: (1985 & 1996)
- Kings: (2007 & 2017)
- Kings of the Road (1976)
- Kings Row (1942)
- The Kings of Summer (2013)
- Kings of the Sun (1963)
- Kingsglaive: Final Fantasy XV (2016)
- Kingsman series:
  - Kingsman: The Secret Service (2014)
  - Kingsman: The Golden Circle (2017)
  - Kingsman: The Blue Blood (2023)
- Kini and Adams (1997)
- Kinjite: Forbidden Subjects (1989)
- Kinky Boots (2005)
- Kinsey (2004)
- Kinski Paganini (1989)

==== Kip–Kir ====
- Kipps: (1921 & 1941)
- Kippur (2000)
- Kira Kiralina (2014)
- Kira's Reason: A Love Story (2001)
- Kiraatham (1985)
- Kiragoorina Gayyaligalu (2016)
- Kirai Dada (1987)
- Kirataka (2011)
- Kiratha Arjuna (1940)
- Kirathakudu (1986)
- Kirayi Rowdylu (1981)
- Kireedam: (1989 & 2007)
- Kireedamillatha Rajakkanmar (1996)
- Kiri no Hata (1965)
- Le Kiri Kandulu (2003)
- Kirik Party (2016)
- Kirikou and the Men and Women (2012)
- Kirikou et les bêtes sauvages (2005)
- Kirikou and the Sorceress (1998)
- The Kirishima Thing (2012)
- Kiriti O Kalo Bhromor (2016)
- Kiriti Roy (2016)
- Kirpaan: The Sword of Honour (2014)
- Kirpi (2009)
- Kirrak Party (2018)

==== Kis ====
- Kisan (2006)
- Kisan Aur Bhagwan (1974)
- Kisan Kanya (1937)
- Kisapmata (1981)
- Kisaragi (2007)
- Kishen Kanhaiya (1990)
- Kishibe-chou Kidan: Tanbou-hen (2012)
- Kishore Kumar Junior (2018)
- Kisise Na Kehna (1942)
- Kiski Biwi (1942)
- Kismat Ka Dhani (1946)
- Kismat Konnection (2008)
- Kismat Love Paisa Dilli (2012)
- Kismet: How Turkish Soap Operas Changed the World (2014)
- Kismet Ka Khel (1956)
- Kismetwala (1986)
- Kisna: The Warrior Poet (2005)
- The Kiss: (1896, 1914, 1921, 1929, 1958, 1988, 2003, 2004 & 2007)
- A Kiss Before Dying: (1956 & 1991)
- The Kiss Before the Mirror (1933)
- Kiss the Blood Off My Hands (1948)
- Kiss the Bride: (2002 & 2008)
- Kiss of the Damned (2012)
- Kiss of Death: (1947 & 1995)
- Kiss of the Dragon (2001)
- The Kiss of Evil (2011)
- Kiss the Girls (1997)
- Kiss Kiss (Bang Bang) (2000)
- Kiss Kiss Bang Bang (2005)
- Kiss Me Deadly (1955)
- Kiss Me Goodbye (1982)
- Kiss Me Kate (1953)
- Kiss Me, Guido (1997)
- Kiss Me, Stupid (1964)
- A Kiss on the Nose (2004)
- Kiss the Sky (1999)
- Kiss of the Spider Woman: (1985 & 2025)
- Kiss Tomorrow Goodbye (1950)
- Kiss of the Vampire (1963)
- Kissa Kursi Ka (1977)
- Kisse Pyaar Karoon (2009)
- Kissebaaz (2019)
- Kissed: (1922 & 1996)
- Kissin' Cousins (1964)
- The Kissing Booth series:
  - The Kissing Booth (2018)
  - The Kissing Booth 2 (2020)
  - The Kissing Booth 3 (2021)
- Kissing a Fool (1998)
- Kissing Jessica Stein (2001)
- Kissinger and Nixon (1995 TV)

==== Kit–Kiz ====
- Kit Carson: (1903, 1928 & 1940)
- Kit Kittredge: An American Girl (2008)
- Kita Kita (2017)
- Kitaab (1977)
- Kitchen: (1966 & 1997)
- The Kitchen: (1961, 2012 & 2019)
- Kitchen Party (1997)
- Kitchen Stories (2003)
- Kitchen. The Last Battle (2017)
- Kite: (1999 & 2014)
- Kite Liberator (2008)
- The Kite Runner (2007)
- Kites (2010)
- The Kites Flying in the Sky (2008)
- Kites Grounded (TBD)
- Kithakithalu (2006)
- Kitne Door Kitne Paas (2002)
- Kitten with a Whip (1964)
- Kittu (2006)
- Kittu Puttu (1977)
- Kittu Unnadu Jagratha (2017)
- Kittur Chenamma (1961)
- Kitturiaq (2013)
- Kitturina Huli (1991)
- Kitty: (1929, 1945, 2002 & 2016)
- Kitty and the Bagman (1983)
- Kitty at Boarding School (1912)
- Kitty Foyle (1940)
- Kitty and the Great Big World (1956)
- Kitty from Kansas City (1931)
- Kitty Kelly, M.D. (1919)
- Kitty Kornered (1946)
- Kitty and the World Conference (1939)
- Kivitoo: What They Thought of Us (2018)
- Kiwani: The Movie (2008)
- Kiwi! (2006)
- Kiwwada Nahi Nokiwwada Nahi (2011)
- Kizhakkan Pathrose (1992)
- Kizhakke Pogum Rail (1978)
- Kizhakke Varum Paattu (1993)
- Kizhakku Africavil Sheela (1987)
- Kizhakku Cheemayile (1993)
- Kizhakku Kadarkarai Salai (2006)
- Kizhakku Karai (1991)
- Kizhakku Mugam (1996)
- Kizhakku Vasal (1990)
- Kizhakkum Merkkum (1998)
- Kizhakkunarum Pakshi (1991)
- Kizudarake no Akuma (2017)
- Kizumonogatari Part 1: Tekketsu (2016)
- Kizumonogatari II: Nekketsu-hen (2016)
- Kizumonogatari Part 3: Reiketsu (2017)

=== Kk–Kl ===
- Kkoli: A Journey of Love (2014)
- Klamek ji bo Beko (1992)
- Klann – grand guignol (1969)
- The Klansman (1974)
- Klanta Aparahna (1985)
- Klapzubova jedenáctka (1938)
- Klara and the Sun (2026)
- Klass (2007)
- Klassfesten (2002)
- Klassiki periptosi vlavis (1987)
- Klassikokkutulek (2016)
- Klatretøsen (2002)
- Klaus (2019)
- Kleine Freiheit (2003)
- Kleine Scheidegg (1937)
- Kleinhoff Hotel (1977)
- Kleinruppin forever (2004)
- Klepto (2003)
- Kleren Maken de Man (1957)
- Klettermaxe: (1927 & 1952)
- Klezmer (2015)
- Klimt (2006)
- Klingende toner (1945)
- Klondike (1932)
- Klondike Annie (1936)
- Klondike Fever (1980)
- Klondike Fury (1942)
- Klondike Kate (1943)
- Klopka (2007)
- Klotz am Bein (1958)
- Klown (2010)
- Klown Forever (2015)
- Klown Kamp Massacre (2010)
- Klunkerz: A Film About Mountain Bikes (2006)
- Klute (1971)

=== Kn ===
==== Kna–Kni ====
- The Knack ...and How to Get It (1965)
- Knall and Fall as Detectives (1953)
- Knall and Fall as Imposters (1952)
- Knave of Hearts (1954)
- The Knave of Hearts (1919)
- The Kneeling Goddess (1947)
- Knhom Jea Neakna (2009 TV)
- Knick Knack (1989)
- Knickerbocker Holiday (1944)
- The Knife: (1961 & 2024)
- Knife Edge (2009)
- Knife Fight (2012)
- Knife in the Head (1978)
- Knife for the Ladies (1974)
- The Knife of the Party (1934)
- Knife Skills (2017)
- The Knife That Killed Me (2014)
- Knife in the Water (1962)
- Knight of 100 Faces (1960)
- The Knight of the Black Sword (1956)
- A Knight in Camelot (1998)
- Knight Club (2001)
- Knight of Cups (2015)
- Knight and Day (2010)
- The Knight of the Dragon (1985)
- The Knight Errant (1922)
- Knight Moves (1992)
- Knight Rider (2008) (TV)
- Knight Rider 2000 (1991) (TV)
- Knight Rider 2010 (1994) (TV)
- The Knight of San Marco (1939)
- The Knight of Shadows: Between Yin and Yang (2019)
- The Knight of the Snows (1912)
- Knight of the Trail (1915)
- Knight Without Armour (1937)
- Knight Without a Country (1959)
- A Knight's Tale (2001)
- Knightquest (2001)
- Knightriders (1981)
- Knights (1993)
- Knights of the City (1986)
- Knights for a Day (1937)
- Knights of the Desert (1942)
- Knights of Justice (2000 TV)
- Knights Must Fall (1949)
- The Knights of the Quest (2001)
- Knights of the Round Table (1953)
- Knights of the South Bronx (2005) (TV)
- Knights of the Teutonic Order (1960)
- Knighty Knight Bugs (1958)
- Knitting (2008)
- The Knitting (2012)
- The Knitting Needles (1916)
- Knives Out (2019)

==== Kno–Knu ====
- Knock on Any Door (1949)
- Knock at the Cabin (2023)
- Knock Down the House (2019)
- Knock 'Em Dead, Kid (2009)
- Knock Knock: (1940 & 2015)
- Knock Knock, It's Tig Notaro (2015)
- Knock Off (1998)
- Knock Out (2010)
- Knock on Wood: (1954 & 1981)
- Knockabout (1979)
- Knockaround Guys (2002)
- Knocked Up (2007)
- Knockin' on Heaven's Door (1997)
- Knocking: (2006 & 2021)
- Knocking on Death's Door (1999)
- Knocking on Heaven's Door (2014)
- Knockout: (1935, 1941, 2001 & 2011)
- The Knockout: (1914, 1923 & 1925)
- The Knockout Kid (1925)
- Knockout Reilly (1927)
- Knocks at My Door (1994)
- The Knot: (1921 & 2006)
- Knots (2005 TV)
- Know Thy Child (1921)
- Know Thy Wife (1918)
- Know Your Ally: Britain (1944)
- Know Your Enemy: Japan (1945)
- Know Your History: Jesus Is Black; So Was Cleopatra (2007)
- Know Your Men (1921)
- Know Your Mushrooms (2008)
- Knowing (2009)
- Knowing Men (1930)
- The Knowledge (1979)
- Known Strangers (2010)
- Knuckle (2011)
- Knuckleball! (2012)
- Knucklebones (1971)
- Knucklehead: (2010 & 2015)
- Knute Rockne, All American (1940)
- Knutzy Knights (1954)

=== Ko ===
- Ko (2011)
- Ko 2 (2016)
- Ko Antey Koti (2012)
- Ko Bongisa Mutu (2002)
- Ko Ko (2012)
- Ko Mark No Mark (2014)
- Ko Tint Toh Super Yat Kwat (2014)
- Ko Yal Toe Yal Soe Soe Yal (1967)

==== Koa–Kod ====
- Koala Kid (2012)
- Kobarweng or Where is Your Helicopter? (1992)
- Kobbari Bondam (1991)
- Kobbari Matta (2018)
- Kobe Doin' Work (2009 TV)
- Kobiety nad przepaścią (1938)
- Koch (2012)
- Koch Brothers Exposed (2012)
- Kochadaiiyaan (2014)
- Kochaj albo rzuć (1977)
- Kochaj tylko mnie (1935)
- Kochaniyan (1994)
- Kochaniyathi (1971)
- Kochavva Paulo Ayyappa Coelho (2016)
- Kochi Rajavu (2005)
- Kochu Kochu Santhoshangal (2000)
- Kochu Kochu Thettukal (1980)
- Kochu Thampuratti (1979)
- Kochu Themmadi (1986)
- Kochumon (1965)
- Kod Adı: K.O.Z. (2015)
- Kodachrome (2017)
- Kōdai-ke no Hitobito (2016)
- Kodaikanal (2008)
- Kodakara Sodo (1935)
- Kodalu Diddina Kapuram (1970)
- Kodambakkam (2006)
- Kodanda Rama (2002)
- Kodanda Ramudu (2000)
- Kodathi Samaksham Balan Vakeel (2019)
- Kodathy (1984)
- Kodi (2016)
- Kodi Parakuthu (1988)
- Kodigo Penal: The Valderrama Case (1980)
- Koditta Idangalai Nirappuga (2017)
- Kodiveeran (2017)
- Kodiyettam (1978)
- Koduku Diddina Kapuram (1989)
- Koduku Kodalu (1972)
- Kodumudikal (1981)
- Kodungallooramma (1968)
- Koduthu Vaithaval (1963)

==== Koe–Kok ====
- Koenigsmark: (1923, 1935 & 1953)
- Koeputkiaikuinen ja Simon enkelit (1979)
- Kofuku (1981)
- Kohinoor: (1960 & 2015)
- Kohlhiesel's Daughters: (1930 & 1962)
- Kohlhiesels Töchter (1920)
- Kohta 18 (2012)
- Kohtalon kirja (2003)
- Koi Aap Sa (2005)
- Koi Jeeta Koi Haara (1976)
- Koi Kisise Kum Nahin (1997)
- Koi Mere Dil Mein Hai (2005)
- Koi Mere Dil Se Poochhe (2002)
- Koi... Mil Gaya (2003)
- Koi Sugata Kitsune Goten (1956)
- Koi Tujh Sa Kahaan (2005)
- Koisuru Onnatachi (1986)
- Koisuru Vampire (2015)
- Koizora (2007)
- Kojak: The Price of Justice (1987)
- Kokey (1997)
- Kokila: (1937, 1977 & 1990)
- Kokilamma (1983)
- Kokki (2006)
- Kokkuri-san (1997)
- Kokkuri-san: Gekijoban (2011)
- Kokkuri-san: Shin Toshi Densetsu (2014)
- Koko and the Ghosts (2011)
- Koko: A Talking Gorilla (1978)
- Koko-di Koko-da (2019)
- Kokoda (2006)
- Kokoda Crescent (1988)
- Kokoro ga Sakebitagatterun Da (2015)
- Kokowääh (2011)
- Kokowääh 2 (2013)
- Kokurikozaka kara (From Up on Poppy Hill) (2011)
- Kokusai himitsu keisatsu: Kagi no kagi (1965)

==== Kol–Kom ====
- Kola Kolaya Mundhirika (2010)
- Kolaigaran (2019)
- Kolaiyuthir Kaalam (2019)
- Kolakkomaban (1983)
- Kolamavu Kokila (2018)
- Kolamba Sanniya (1976)
- Kolamba Sanniya Returns (2018)
- Kolangal: (1981 & 1995)
- Kolberg (1945)
- Kolka Cool (2011)
- Kolkatay Kohinoor (2019)
- Kollaikaran (2012)
- Kollura Sri Mookambika (1993)
- Kolpaçino (2009)
- Kolpaçino: Bomba (2011)
- Kolumittayi (2016)
- Kolumpo (2013)
- Kolya (1996)
- Koma (2004)
- Komaali Kings (2018)
- Komal Gandhar (1961)
- Komaligal (1976)
- Komaram (1982)
- Komaram Bheem (2010)
- Komatha En Kulamatha (1973)
- Komban (2015)
- The Komediant (2000)
- Komedianti (1954)
- Komm, süßer Tod (2000)
- Kommando 1944 (2018)
- Komodo (2000)
- Komodo vs. Cobra (2005)
- Komola Rocket (2018)
- Komori Seikatsu Kojo Club (2008)
- Kompull Boros Mok 2 (1972)
- Komsomolsk (1938)

==== Kon–Kop ====
- The Kon Ichikawa Story (2006)
- Kon Khon (2011)
- Kon-Tiki: (1950 & 2012)
- Kona Coast (1968)
- Koncert: (1954 & 1982)
- Konchem Ishtam Konchem Kashtam (2009)
- Konchem Koththaga (2008)
- Konda (2022)
- Kondapalli Raja (1993)
- Kondattam (1998)
- Kondaveeti Raja (1986)
- Kondaveeti Simham (1981)
- Konec básníků v Čechách (1993)
- Konec cesty (1960)
- Konec jasnovidce (1957)
- Konec milování (1913)
- Koneline: Our Land Beautiful (2016)
- Kong: Skull Island (2017)
- Konga (1961)
- Konga Yo (1962)
- Kongo (1932)
- Kongsi (2011)
- Kongunattu Thangam (1961)
- Konji Pesalaam (2003)
- Konjiki no Gash Bell!! Movie 2: Attack of the Mecha-Vulcan (2005)
- Konjum Kumari (1963)
- Konjum Salangai (1962)
- Konthayum Poonoolum (2014)
- Kontinuasom (2009)
- Kontroll (2003)
- Kony (1986)
- Kony 2012 (2012)
- Koodal Nagar (2007)
- Koodanayum Kattu (1986)
- Koodi Balona (1975)
- Koodi Vazhnthal Kodi Nanmai: (1959 & 2000)
- Koodikazhcha (1991)
- Koodum Thedi (1985)
- Kooduthedunna Parava (1984)
- The Kook (2011)
- Kook's Tour (1970)
- Koondukkili (1954)
- Koormavatara (2011)
- Kootathil Oruthan (2017)
- Koothara (2014)
- Koottinilamkili (1984)
- Koottu (2004)
- Koottukar: (1966 & 2010)
- Koottukudumbam (1969)
- Koottu Puzhukkal (1987)
- The Kopanoi (1987)
- Koper (2006)
- Kopps (2003)

==== Kor–Koz ====
- Kora Badan (1974)
- Kora Kagaz (1974)
- Kora Terry (1940)
- Koratty Pattanam Railway Gate (2011)
- Korczak (1990)
- Korea: (1952 & 1995)
- Korea: Battleground for Liberty (1959)
- The Korean Connection (1974)
- A Korean in Paris (2015)
- The Korean Wedding Chest (2009)
- Koritharicha Naal (1982)
- Kosh ba kosh (1993)
- Kosher Kitty Kelly (1926)
- Koshish (1972)
- Kostas (1979)
- Kotch (1971)
- Kote (2011)
- Koteeswarudu (1984)
- Kotha Bangaru Lokam (2008)
- Kotha Janta (2014)
- Kotha Jeevithalu (1980)
- Kotha Pelli Koothuru (1985)
- Kotigobba (2001)
- Kotigobba 2 (2016)
- Kotlovina (2011)
- Koto (1980)
- Kotodama – Spiritual Curse (2014)
- Kotoko (2011)
- Kotovsky (1942)
- Kotreshi Kanasu (1994)
- Kotta Alludu (1979)
- Kottapeta Rowdy (1980)
- Kottappurathe Koottukudumbam (1997)
- Kottaaram Vilkkaanundu (1975)
- Kottai Mariamman (2001)
- Kottai Vaasal (1992)
- Kottaram Veettile Apputtan (1998)
- Kottum Kuravayum (1987)
- Kotwal Saab (1977)
- Koumara Swapnangal (1991)
- Koundi et le jeudi national (2010)
- Kounterfeit (1996)
- Kouthuka Varthakal (1990)
- The Kovak Box (2006)
- Kovil (2004)
- Koyaanisqatsi (1982)
- Koyelaanchal (2014)
- Koyil Kaalai (1993)
- Koyil Puraa (1981)
- Koyla (1997)
- Kozhi Koovuthu: (1982 & 2012)
- Kozure Ōkami: Sono Chiisaki Te ni (1993)

=== Kr ===
==== Kra–Kre ====
- Krabat (2008)
- Krabat – The Sorcerer's Apprentice (1978)
- Krack (2021)
- Krakatoa (1933)
- Krakatoa, East of Java (1969)
- Krakel Spektakel (2014)
- Kraken: Tentacles of the Deep (2006)
- Krakonoš a lyžníci (1981)
- Kraljeva završnica (1987)
- Kramer vs. Kramer (1979)
- Krampus (2015)
- Krampus: The Devil Returns (2016)
- Krampus: The Reckoning (2015)
- Krampus Unleashed (2016)
- Kranthiveera Sangolli Rayanna (1967)
- Krantiveera Sangolli Rayanna (2012)
- Kranthiyogi Basavanna (1983)
- Kranti: (1981, 2002 & 2006)
- Kranti Veera (1972)
- Krantidhara (2016)
- Krantikaal (2005)
- Krantiveer (1994)
- Krates (1913)
- Kraven the Hunter (2023)
- The Krays (1990)
- Krazy Kat & Ignatz Mouse Discuss the Letter 'G' (1916)
- Krazy Kat and Ignatz Mouse: A Duet, He Made Me Love Him (1916)
- Krazy Spooks (1933)
- Krazy's Race of Time (1937)
- Krazy's Waterloo (1934)
- Krazzy 4 (2008)
- Krechinsky's Wedding (1953)
- Krek (1968)
- The Kremlin Letter (1970)
- Kremmen: The Movie (1980)
- The Kreutzer Sonata: (1911, 1915, 1920, 1922, 1927, 1937, 1987 & 2008)

==== Kri–Kry ====
- Kri (2018)
- Kri-Kri, the Duchess of Tarabac (1920)
- Krieg der Lügen (2014)
- Kriemhild's Revenge (1924)
- Kriminal (1966)
- Kriminaltango (1960)
- Kring... Kring... (2015)
- Krippendorf's Tribe (1998)
- Krisha (2015)
- Krishna: (1996 Hindi, 1996 Tamil, 2006, 2007 & 2008)
- Krishna Arjun (1997)
- Krishna Aur Kans (2012)
- Krishna Babu (1999)
- Krishna Bakthi (1949)
- Krishna Bhakta Bodana (1944)
- Krishna Cottage (2004)
- Krishna Gaadi Veera Prema Gaadha (2016)
- Krishna Gopalakrishna (2002)
- Krishna Krishna (2001)
- Krishna-Krishna (1986)
- Krishna Leela: (1946 & 2015)
- Krishna Nee Begane Baro (1986)
- Krishna Nee Kunidaga (1989)
- Krishna Nee Late Aagi Baaro (2010)
- Krishna Pakshakkilikal (2002)
- Krishna-Rukku (2016)
- Krishna Sudhaama (1943)
- Krishna Tere Desh Main (2000)
- Krishna Vijayam (1950)
- Krishnagudiyil Oru Pranayakalathu (1997)
- Krishnam Vande Jagadgurum (2012)
- Krishnamma Kalipindi Iddarini (2015)
- Krishnan Love Story (2010)
- Krishnan Marriage Story (2011)
- Krishnan Thoothu (1940)
- Krishnan Vandhaan (1987)
- Kristy (2014)
- Kroadh (1990)
- Krodh (2000)
- Krodham (1982)
- Krodham 2 (2000)
- Krodhi (1981)
- Krok do tmy (1937)
- Kroll (1991)
- Kronk's New Groove (2005)
- Kronos (1957)
- Krrish series:
  - Koi... Mil Gaya (2003)
  - Krrish (2006)
  - Krrish 3 (2013)
- Krudt og klunker (1958)
- Krull (1983)
- Krung Diew Kor Kern Por (1988)
- Krush Groove (1985)
- Kruté radosti (2002)
- Krvavý román (1993)
- Krybskytterne på Næsbygård (1966)
- Krystal (2017)

=== Ks ===
- Kshamichu Ennoru Vakku (1986)
- Kshana Kshana (2007)
- Kshanakkathu (1990)
- Kshanam (2016)
- Kshanbhar Vishranti (2010)
- Kshatriya (1993)
- Kshema Bhoomi (2010)
- Kshemamga Velli Labhamga Randi (2000)
- Kshetram (2011)
- Kshudhita Pashan (1960)

=== Ku ===
- Ku! Kin-dza-dza (2013)
- Ku-Fu? Dalla Sicilia con furore (1973)

==== Kua–Kud ====
- Kuarup (1989)
- Kubala (1955)
- Kubera Kuchela (1943)
- Kubera Theevu (1963)
- Kuberan: (2000 & 2002)
- Kubi Matthu Iyala (1992)
- Kubinke the Barber (1926)
- Kubo and the Two Strings (2016)
- Kubot: The Aswang Chronicles 2 (2014)
- Kucch Luv Jaisaa (2011)
- Kucch To Hai (2003)
- Kuch Khatti Kuch Meethi (2001)
- Kuch Kuch Hota Hai (1998)
- Kuch Kuch Locha Hai (2015)
- Kuch Naa Kaho (2003)
- Kuch Tum Kaho Kuch Hum Kahein (2002)
- Kuchh Bheege Alfaaz (2018)
- Kuchh Meetha Ho Jaye (2005)
- Kuchhe Dhaage (1973)
- Kuchibiru ni uta o (2015)
- Kudaikul Mazhai (2004)
- Kudamattam (1997)
- Kudesan (2012)
- Kudiattam (1986)
- Kudirithe Kappu Coffee (2011)
- Kudiyarasu (2009)
- Kudiyirundha Koyil (1968)
- Kudiyon Ka Hai Zamana (2006)
- Kudrat: (1981 & 1998)
- Kudumba Gouravam (1958)
- Kudumba Sangili (1999)
- Kudumba Thalaivan (1962)
- Kudumba Vaarthakal (1998)
- Kudumba Vilakku (1956)
- Kudumba Vishesham (1994)
- Kudumbam: (1954, 1967 & 1984)
- Kudumbam Namukku Sreekovil (1978)
- Kudumbam Oru Kadambam (1981)
- Kudumbam Oru Koyil (1987)
- Kudumbapuranam (1988)
- Kudumbasree Travels (2011)
- Kudumbini (1964)
- Kuduz (1989)

==== Kue–Kum ====
- Kuei-Mei, a Woman (1985)
- Kueki Ressha (2012)
- Kuffs (1992)
- Kuhak (1960)
- Kuheli (1971)
- Kuhio taisa (2009)
- Kuhle Wampe (1932)
- Kuhveriakee Kaakuhey? (2011)
- Kuiba (2011)
- Kuiba 2 (2013)
- Kuiba 3 (2014)
- Kukka Katuku Cheppu Debba (1979)
- Kuku 3D (2013)
- Kuku Mathur Ki Jhand Ho Gayi (2014)
- Kukurantumi, the road to Accra (1983)
- Kula Dheivam (1956)
- Kula Gotralu (1962)
- Kula Gourava (1971)
- Kula Gowravam (1972)
- Kulam (1997)
- Kulama Gunama (1971)
- Kulamagal Radhai (1963)
- Kulambadikal (1986)
- Kulavadhu (1963)
- Kule kidz gråter ikke (2014)
- Kulimlim (2004)
- Kulir 100° (2009)
- Kulirkaala Megangal (1986)
- Kull the Conqueror (1997)
- Kulla Agent 000 (1972)
- Kulla Kulli (1980)
- Kullanari Koottam (2011)
- Kultur (1918)
- Kulvadhu (1937)
- Kuma (2012)
- Kuma Ching (1969)
- Kumara Raja (1961)
- Kumara Sambhavam (1969)
- Kumaré (2011)
- Kumari: (1952 & 1977)
- Kumari 21F (2015)
- Kumari Kottam (1971)
- Kumari Penn (1966)
- Kumari Pennin Ullathile (1980)
- Kumbakarai Thangaiah (1991)
- Kumbakonam Gopalu (1998)
- Kumbalangi Nights (2019)
- Kumbasaram (2015)
- Kumiko, the Treasure Hunter (2014)
- Kumir (1988)
- Kumki (2012)
- Kumkum the Dancer (1940)
- Kumkuma Rakshe (1977)
- Kumkumacheppu (1996)
- Kummatty (1979)
- Kummeli: Kultakuume (1997)
- Kummelin Jackpot (2006)
- Kummi Paattu (1999)
- Kumo to Tulip (1943)
- Kumpanía: Flamenco Los Angeles (2011)
- Kumu Hina (2014)
- Kumudham (1961)

==== Kun ====
- Kun en Tigger (1912)
- Kundan (1955)
- Kundo: Age of the Rampant (2014)
- Kundun (1997)
- Kung Aagawin Mo Ang Lahat Sa Akin (1987)
- Kung Ayaw Mo, Huwag Mo! (1998)
- Kung Fu Angels (2014)
- Kung Fu Chefs (2009)
- Kung Fu Cult Master (1993)
- Kung Fu Divas (2013)
- Kung Fu Dunk (2008)
- Kung Fu Elliot (2014)
- Kung Fu Finger Book (1979)
- Kung Fu Hustle (2004)
- The Kung Fu Instructor (1979)
- Kung Fu Jungle (2014)
- Kung Fu Kid (1994)
- Kung Fu Killers (1974)
- Kung Fu Mahjong (2005)
- Kung Fu Mahjong 2 (2005)
- Kung Fu Mama (2011)
- Kung Fu Man (2012)
- Kung Fu Master (1988)
- Kung Fu Monster (2018)
- Kung Fu Panda series:
  - Kung Fu Panda (2008)
  - Kung Fu Panda 2 (2011)
  - Kung Fu Panda 3 (2016)
  - Kung Fu Panda 4 (2024)
- Kung Fu Pocong Perawan (2012)
- The Kung Fu Scholar (1993)
- Kung Fu Style (2015)
- Kung Fu Tootsie (2007)
- Kung Fu Vs. Yoga (1979)
- Kung Fu VS Acrobatic (1990)
- Kung Fu Yoga (2017)
- Kung Fu Zombie (1981)
- Kung Fu: The Movie (1986)
- Kung Fury (2015)
- Kung Fury 2 (2022)
- Kung-Fu Magoo (2010)
- Kung Hei Fat Choy (1985)
- Kung Ikaw Ay Isang Panaginip (2002)
- Kung Mangarap Ka't Magising (1977)
- Kung Phooey (2003)
- Kung Pow: Enter the Fist (2002)
- Kungajakt (1944)
- Kungfu Cyborg (2009)
- Kungliga patrasket (1945)
- Kunguma Chimil (1985)
- Kunguma Kodu (1988)
- Kunguma Poovum Konjum Puravum (2009)
- Kunguma Pottu Gounder (2001)
- Kungumam (1963)
- Kuni Mulgi Deta Ka Mulgi (2012)
- Kunisada Chūji: (1954 & 1958)
- The Kunoichi: Ninja Girl (2011)

==== Kup–Kur ====
- Kuppathu Raja: (1979 & 2019)
- Kuppivala (1965)
- Kura (1995)
- Kurama Tengu (1928)
- Kurama Tengu: Kyōfu Jidai (1928)
- Kurama Tengu ōedo ihen (1950)
- Kurangu Bommai (2017)
- Kurbaan: (1991 & 2009)
- Kurfürstendamm (1920)
- Kurigalu Saar Kurigalu (2001)
- The Kurnell Story (1957)
- Kuro Arirang (1989)
- Kuroko's Basketball The Movie: Last Game (2017)
- Kuroneko (1968)
- Kurosagi (2006)
- Kurosawa's Way (2011)
- Kurt Cobain: About a Son (2006)
- Kurt Cobain: Montage of Heck (2015)
- Kurt & Courtney (1998)
- Kurtlar Vadisi Irak (2006)
- Kurtuluş: The Steamship That Carried Peace (2006)
- Kurukkan Rajavayi (1987)
- Kurukkante Kalyanam (1982)
- Kurukshethram (1970)
- Kurukshetra: (1945, 2000, 2002, 2008 & 2019)
- Kurukshetram: (1977 & 2006)
- Kurulu Bedda (1961)
- Kurulu Pihatu (2006)
- Kuruthi Aattam (2022)
- Kuruthipunal (1995)
- Kuruthykkalam (1969)

==== Kus–Kuz ====
- Kusa Pabha (2012)
- Kusal (2018)
- Kusama: Infinity (2018)
- Kush (2007)
- Kushi: (2000, 2001 & 2022)
- Kushi Kushiga (2004)
- Kushti (2010)
- Kusruthi Kuruppu (1998)
- Kusruthikaatu (1995)
- Kusruthykuttan (1966)
- Kustom Kar Kommandos (1965)
- Kusum Kusum Prem (2011)
- Kusume Rumal (1985)
- Kusume Rumal 2 (2009)
- Kuthoosi (2019)
- Kuthu (2004)
- Kutravaaligal (1985)
- Kutsal Damacana (2007)
- Kutsal Damacana: Dracoola (2011)
- Kutsal Damacana 2: İtmen (2010)
- Kutsu-Juku seiklusi (1931)
- Kuttettan (1990)
- Kutti Puli (2013)
- Kuttikalundu Sookshikkuka (2016)
- Kuttikkuppayam (1964)
- Kuttram Purindhaal (2018)
- Kuttram Seiyel (2019)
- Kuttrame Thandanai (2016)
- Kuttrapathirikai (2007)
- Kuttravali (1989)
- Kutty: (2001 & 2010)
- Kutumba Gowravam (1957)
- Kutuzov (1943)
- Kuva Kuva Vaathugal (1984)
- Kuveni 2: Yakshadeshaya (TBD)
- Kuxa Kanema: The Birth of Cinema (2003)
- Kuyiline Thedi (1983)
- Kuzhandaiyum Deivamum (1965)
- Kuzhandhaigal Kanda Kudiyarasu (1960)
- Kuzhanthaikkaga (1968)

=== Kv–Ky ===
- Kvadrat (2013)
- Kwai Boo (2015)
- Kwaidan (1965)
- Kwaku Ananse (2013)
- The Kwannon of Okadera (1920)
- Kwiecień (1961)
- Kya Dilli Kya Lahore (2014)
- Kya Kehna (2000)
- Kya Love Story Hai (2007)
- Kya Yahi Sach Hai (2011)
- Kya Yehi Pyaar Hai (2002)
- Kyaa Dil Ne Kahaa (2002)
- Kyaa Kool Hai Hum (2005)
- Kyaa Kool Hain Hum 3 (2016)
- Kyaa Super Kool Hain Hum (2012)
- Kyan Sit Min (2005)
- Kyō Kara Hitman (2009)
- Kyo Kii... Main Jhuth Nahin Bolta (2001)
- Kyon? Kis Liye? (2003)
- Kyon Ki (2005)
- Kyoufu Densetsu Kaiki! Frankenstein (1981 TV)
- Kyu-chan no Dekkai Yume (1967)
- Kyuketsu Onsen e Yokoso (1997)
- Kyun...! Ho Gaya Na (2004)
- Kyun Tum Say Itna Pyar Hai (2005)

Previous: List of films: I Next: List of films: L

== See also ==
- Lists of films
- Lists of actors
- List of film and television directors
- List of documentary films
- List of film production companies
