= Baburao Pendharkar =

Indian actor (1896–1967)

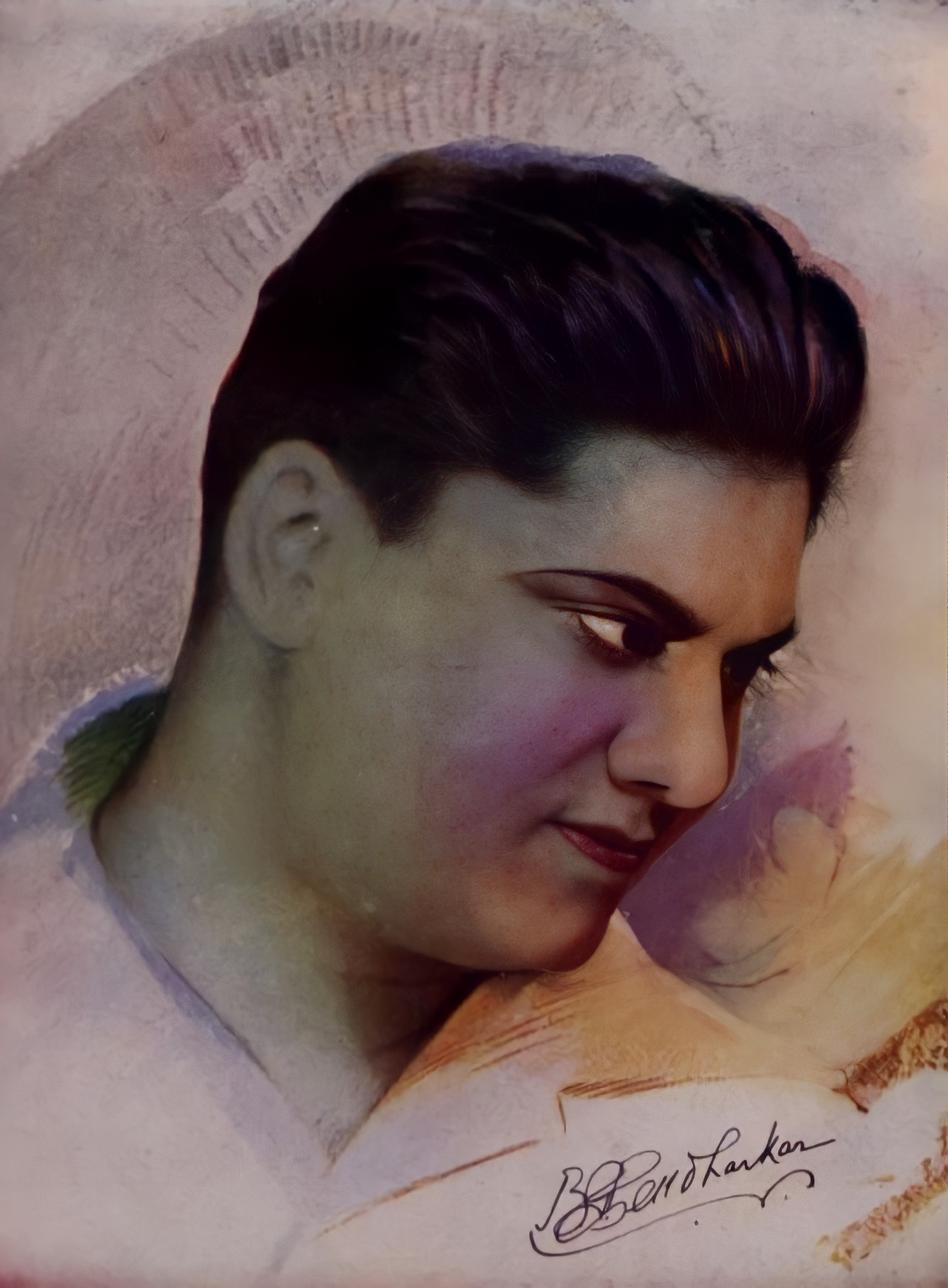
- Modern AI-enhanced upscaling of a 1930s film poster
- Born: 22 June 1896; Kolhapur, Maharashtra, India
- Died: 3 November 1967 (aged 71); Bombay, Maharashtra, India
- Occupations: Film actor; director; Film producer; writer
- Relatives: Bhalji Pendharkar (brother); V. Shantaram (cousin); Master Vinayak (half-brother Nanda (niece)

Baburao Pendharkar (22 June 1896 – 3 November 1967), was an Indian actor, director, film producer and writer.

== Personal life ==
Baburao Pendharkar was born on 22 June 1896 in Kolhapur in a Brahmin family. Born to Radhabai and her patron Dr Gopal Pendharkar, Baburao was related to quite a few film personalities in Indian film industry. His younger brother Bhalji Pendharkar was a famous film director, producer and writer. Other famous names in family included his younger maternal half-brother Master Vinayak, Radhabai's son after she married Karnataki, and maternal cousin V. Shantaram, son of Kamalabai, Radhabai's younger sister. Baburao married Shree Kumudini and had two sons and two daughters each with her.

He died on 9 November 1967, in Bombay aged 71.

== Film career ==
Baburao started his career in the era of silent films.

=== Actor (68 credits) ===
- 1966 Amrapali
- 1966 Ladki Sahyadri Ki
- 1963 Mohityanchi Manjula
- 1963 Sehra
- 1961 Stree
- 1959 Navrang
- 1958 Mausi
- 1957 Naikinicha Sazza
- 1957 Do Ankhen Barah Haath (as Superintendent)
- 1956 Devghar
- 1956 Pavankhind
- 1955 Pyaara Dushman
- 1955 Adamkhor
- 1955 Bhedi Lutera
- 1954 Halla Gulla
- 1954 Africa
- 1954 Sitamgar
- 1953 Shyamchi Aai
- 1950 Shilanganache Sone
- 1949 Pyaar Ki Raat (as Baburao)
- 1949 Shaukeen (as Baburao)
- 1948 Adalat
- 1948 Lalach
- 1946 Black and White (as Baburao)
- 1946 Dr. Kotnis Ki Amar Kahani (General Fong)
- 1946 Jeevan Yatra (Vishwas)
- 1946 Jina Sikho
- 1946 Khooni
- 1946/II Rukmini Swayamvar
- 1946/I Valmiki
- 1945 Pahali Nazar (as Baburao)
- 1944 Bahadur (as Baburao)
- 1944 Draupadi
- 1944 Taxi Driver (as Baburao)
- 1943 Bhagta Bhoot
- 1943 Khooni Laash
- 1943 Nagad Narayan
- 1942 Pahila Palna (Dhananjay)
- 1941/II Amrit (Krishna)
- 1941/I Amrit (Krishna)
- 1940 Ardhangi
- 1940 Ghar Ki Rani
- 1940 Lapandav
- 1939 Devata (Ashok)
- 1939 Mera Haq (as Baburao)
- 1938 Na Honewali Baat (as Baburao)
- 1937/II Dharmaveer
- 1937/I Dharmaveer
- 1936/II Chhaya (Dr. Atal)
- 1936/I Chhaya (Dr. Atal)
- 1936 Nazar Ki Shikari (as Baburao)
- 1935 Kalkoot
- 1935 Nigah-e-Nafrat (Vilas-Ishwar)
- 1935 Sone Ka Shohar (as Baburao)
- 1935 Vilasi Ishwar (Vilas / Ishwar)
- 1934/II Akashwani (Dikpal)
- 1934/I Akashwani (Dikpal)
- 1934 Prem Pariksha (as Baburao)
- 1933 Chandrahasa (as Baburao)
- 1933 Sinhagad (Udaybhanu)
- 1932 Agnikankan: Branded Oath (Raja Naagraya)
- 1932 Ayodhyecha Raja (Mahajan Ganganath)
- 1932 Maya Bazaar (as Baburao)
- 1932 Maya Machhindra
- 1930 Randhir (as Baburao)
- 1930 Udaykal
- 1927 Vande Mataram Ashram
- 1920 Sairandhri (Krishna)

=== Director (2 credits) ===
- 1952/I Vishwamitra
- 1933 Seeta Kalyanam

=== Producer (2 credits) ===
- 1944 Draupadi (producer)
- 1927 Vande Mataram Ashram (producer)

=== Writer (1 credit) ===
- 1930 Udaykal
