= List of Hindi films of 1946 =

A list of films produced by the Bollywood film industry based in Mumbai in 1946:

== Highest-grossing films ==
The five highest-grossing films at the Indian box office in 1946:

Rank	Title	Nett collection
1	Anmol Ghadi	₹1 crore
2	Shahjehan	₹60 lakh
3	Phulwari	₹40 lakh
4	Omar Khaiyyam	₹35 lakh
5	1857	₹30 lakh

== A-B ==
Title	Director	Cast	Genre	Notes/Music
1857	Mohan Sinha	Surendra, Suraiya, Menaka Devi, Nigar	Drama, History	Music: Sajjad Hussain; Lyrics: Anjum Pilibhiti
Aath Din a.k.a. 8 Days	Dattaram N. Pai	Ashok Kumar, Veera, Saadat Hasan Manto, Sunalini Devi, Upendranath Ashk, Raja Mehdi Ali Khan, S. L. Puri, Leela Mishra, Agha Jaan		Story: Saadat Hasan Manto; Music: S. D. Burman; Lyrics: Qamar Jalalabadi, Gopal Singh Nepali
Aai Bahar	Shankar Mehta	Irshad, Om Prakash, Ajmal, Asha Posley, Noor Mohammed Charlie, Ramesh	Social	Music: Pandit Amarnath, Anupam Ghatak; Lyrics: D. N. Madhok
Aap Ki Sewa Mein				
Airmail	A. Rashid	Dilawar, Surekha, Atish Sayani, Maqbool Ali, Mannan	Action	Music: Khan Mastana; Lyrics: Shewan Rizvi
Alibaba	Nanubhai Vakil	Prakash, N. A. Ansari, Shanta Patel	Fantasy	Music: Ram Gopal, Damodar Sharma; Lyrics:
Amar Raj	Homi Wadia	Trilok Kapoor, Nirupa Roy, Naseem Jr, Prakash, Dalpat, Atish Sayani	Mythological	Music: Firoz Nizami; Lyrics: Pandit Phani, I. C. Kapoor
Anmol Ghadi	Mehboob Khan	Noor Jehan, Surendra, Suraiya, Zahur Raja, Murad, Leela Mishra, Anwari, Amir Banu, Bhudo Advani	Romantic Drama	Music: Naushad; Lyrics: Tanveer Zaidi
Arabian Nights	Niren Lahiri	Kanan Devi, Nawab, Molina, Hiralal, Sunder, Debi Mukherjee	Adventure, Fantasy	Music: Kamal Dasgupta; Lyrics: Fayyaz Hashmi
Arab Ka Chand	Naseem Siddiqi	Prakash, Shanta Patel, Iqbal, Rafiq Ansari, Mumtaz	Costume	Music: Ram Gopal Pandey; Lyrics: Roopbani
Arab Ka Sitara	Nanubhai Vakil	Prakash, Amirbai Karnataki, Iqbal, Cuckoo	Costume	Music: S. Qureshi; Lyrics: Shewan Rizvi
Attention				
Baap	S. Shamsuddin	Paresh Bannerjee, Urmila, Sunder, Tandon, Radharani, Shobha	Family	Music: K. P. Sen; Lyrics: Pt. Deepak Chakravarti, Jameel Mazhari
Bachchon Ka Khel	Raja Nene	Agha, Nimbalkar, Kabir, Baby Meena Kumari, Baby Shakuntala,	Social	Music: C. Ramchandra; Lyrics: Mukhram Sharma. Magan
Badnami	Majnu	Balraj Sahni, Geeta Bali, Zubeida, Pran, Manorama, Majnu, Asha Posley, Leela	Social	Music: Anupam Ghatak, Lachhiram Tamar; Lyrics: Aziz Kashmiri
Baghdad Ka Chor	Nanubhai Vakil	Prakash, N. A. Ansari, Ayaz Begum	Costume	Music: Ram Gopal Pandey; Lyrics: Roopbani
Behram Khan	Gajanan Jagirdar	Mehtab, Sunalini Devi, Jagirdar, Suresh, Lalita Pawar, David, Benjamin, Hansa	Historical Biopic Drama	Music: Ghulam Haider; Lyrics: Buta Ram Sharma
Bhakta Prahlad	Dhirubhai Desai	Ulhas, Raj Kumari, Anant Marathe, Leela Chitnis, Dixit, Kedar Kapoor, Tiwari	Devorional	Music: K C Verma, Hanuman Prasad; Lyrics: Rammurti Chaturvedi, Bekal, Saraswati Kumar Deepak
Bhedi Dushman	Ramjibhai Arya	Kusum Deshpande, Kishore, Dalpat, Nazira, Majnu, Bibijan	Action	Music: Hafiz Khan Mastana; Lyrics:Shewan Rizvi
Bhedi Khazana	S. Usman	Sardar Mansur, Madhurika, Bibijan, Bacha	Action	Music: Lyrics:
Bindiya	Chimanlal Luhar	Ragini, Shakir, Kamal Zamindr, Amar, Leela Mishra	Social	Music: Kamal Dasgupta; Lyrics: Pandit Rammurti, Pandit Madhur
Black and White	S. M. Raza	John Cawas, Kusum Kumari, Nazira, Ranibala, Bacha, Baburao Pendharkar	Action	Music: K. Narayana Rao; Lyrics: Shewan Rizwi
Black Shirt	Framji Havewala	Benjamin, Malika, Pratima Devi	Action	Music: H. N. Sharma; Lyrics: Safdar Mirza
Brahman Kanya	Safdar Mirza	Benjamin, Malika, Pratima, Razia, Younus, Mannan	Social	Music: Lyrics:

== C-G ==
Title	Director	Cast	Genre	Notes
Chalis Karod	Nanabhai Bhatt	Nirmala, Arun Kumar Ahuja, Yakub, Agha, Gope, Gulab, Shantarin		Music: Lyrics: Safdar Mirza
Chamakti Bijli	Homi Master	E. Billimoria, Sulochana Chatterjee, Sheikh, Mohammed Ali, Mehndi Raza	Action	Music: Vasant Kumar Naidu; Lyrics: Pandit Bhardwaj
Chandni Chowk	Thakur Himmat Singh	Erika, Naeem Hashmi	Drama	Music: Lyrics:
Chehra	R. Sharma	Suraiya, Kamal Zamindar, Najma, S, Kapoor, Zulfi, Jugal Kishore, Amir Banu	Social	Music: M. A. Mukhtar; Lyrics: I. C. Kapoor
Circus King	B.R. Mudnaney	Brijmala, Baburao, Cuckoo, Mirajkar, Ghori	Action	Music: N. Nagesh Rao, J. Abhyankar; Lyrics: Raziuddin
Dasi Ya Maa	Shaukat Hussain Rizvi	Durga Khote, Shahu Modak, Jilloo, Shantarin, Majid	Family Drama	Music: Mushtaq Hussain; Lyrics: Waheed Qureshi
Dev Kanya	Dhirubhai Desai	Leela Desai, Ulhas, Leela Chitnis, Wasti, Jilloo, Kashinath, Indira	Fantasy	Music: Shyam Sundar; Lyrics: Rammurti Chaturvedi, Saraswati Kumar Deepak, Ramchandra Pandey
Devar	S.M. Yusuf	Yakub, Kumar, Jyoti, Yashodhra Katju, Agha, Khurshid Jr.	Family	Music: Gulshan Sufi; Lyrics: Aziz Siddiqui, Khumar Barabankvi, Shams Azimabadi, M. Naseem
Dhadkan	Zahur Raja	Zahur Raja, Jyoti, Murad, Misra, Chandrika	Romance Drama	Music: G. M. Durrani; Lyrics: Zahur Raja
Dhanwan	Vishnu Vyas	P. Jairaj, Paro Devi, Anjana, Dulari, Bhagwandas, Radha, Dhulia	Social	Music: Shanti Kumar; Lyrics: Behzad Lakhnavi, Roopbani
Dharti	Manibhai Vyas	Trilok Kapoor, Mumtaz Shanti, Padma Bannerjee, Bikram Kapoor	Social	Music: Bulo C. Rani; Lyrics: Pandit Indra
Dharti Ke Lal	Khwaja Ahmad Abbas	Balraj Sahni, Tripti Mitra, Damyanti Sahni, Hameed Butt, Zohra Sehgal (debut), Shombu Mitra, K. N. Singh, David, Rashid Ahmed	Socialist realism	Music: Ravi Shankar; Lyrics: Ali Sardar Jafri, Prem Dhawan, Nemichand Jain, Vamik
Dhokhebaaz	R. Shivraj	Chandrakala, Agha, Baburao Pehalwan, Radharani, Pesi Patel, Raj Kumar, Putli	Action	Music: K. Narayana Rao; Lyrics: Bhadar Gundvi
Dil	S. F. Hasnain	Noorjehan, Abdul Latif, Baby Zubaida, Amina	Romantic Drama	Music: Zafar Khursheed; Lyrics: Raziuddin
Door Chalen	Phani Majumdar	Naseem Banu, Balraj Sahni, Damyanti Sahni, Agha, Raj Kumari, David, Kamal	Social Drama	Music: K. C. Dey; Lyrics:
Dosti	Bhagwan	Bhagwan, Usha Shukla, Azim, Harish, Sarita, Inamdar, Vasant Rao, Bibijan		Music: Ram Chitalkar; Lyrics: Chabi Kumar Mast
Dr. Kotnis Ki Amar Kahani	V. Shantaram	V. Shantaram, Jayashree, Keshavrao Date, Dewan Sharar, Vinayak, Jankidas, Ulhas, Baburao Pendharkar	Biopic Drama	Music: Vasant Desai; Lyrics: Dewan Sharar
Double Face	M. Udwadia	Satyanarayan, M. Udwadia, Naval	Action	Music: Shyam Babu Pathak; Lyrics: Indeevar
Dulha	Manibhai Vyas	Noor Mohammed Charlie, Gulab, Chandraprabha, Moni Chatterjee, Sankatha Prasad, Bhagwandas, Indira	Social	Music: Gyan Dutt; Lyrics: B. R. Sharma
Duniya Ek Sarai	Kidar Sharma	Begum Para, Gajanan Jagirdar, Pandit Iqbal, Meena Kumari	Social	Music: Hansraj Behl; Lyrics: Kidar Sharma
Durban	S. M. Yusuf	Kumar, Sulochana Chatterjee, Kaushalya, Yakub, Leela Mishra, S. D. Narang	Social	Music: Gulshan Sufi; Lyrics: Tanveer Naqvi, M. Naseem
Ever Ready	Nari Ghadiali	Benjamin, Sharda, Ali, Bibijan, Pepo Oliva	Action	Music: Narayan Rao Vyas; Lyrics:
Fighting Hero	Keshav Talpade	Ramesh Vyas, Sudha Rao, Iqbal Begum, Moolchand, Niranjan Sharma, S. Nazir	Action	Music: Chitragupta; Lyrics: I. C. Kapoor
Flying Prince	Homi Wadia	Fearless Nadia, John Cawas, Sona Chatterjee, Dalpat, Atish Sayani, Boman Shroff, Master Mohammed	Action	Music: Aziz Khan; Lyrics: Pandit Gyan Chandra
Ghungat	Shanti Kumar	Nirmala, Arun Kumar, Uma Kant, Ramesh Sinha, Leela Mishra	Family Drama	Music: Shankar Rao Vyas; Lyrics: Ramesh Gupta
Gwalan	Baburao Patel	Trilok Kapoor, Sushila Rani (Patel), David, Bipin Gupta, Madhuri, Bikram Kapoor	Social	Music: Hansraj Behl; Lyrics: Pandit Indra

== H-J ==
Title	Director	Cast	Genre	Notes
Haqdar	Rafiq Rizwi	Sayani Atish, Najma Begum, Harish	Costume	Music: Mohammed Shafi; Lyrics: C. M. Hunar
Hasrat	Shail Mukherjee	Suraiya, Dilawar, Ranibala, Mehrunissa, Sadiq, Roshan, Rashid	Social	Music: M. Sagar, Arun Roy; Lyrics:
Hawai Khautala	A. M. Khan	Gauhar Karnataki, Devraj, Chisti, Ameena, Bashir	Action	Music: Bashir Dehalvi; Lyrics: Qaiser Sabai, Munshi Nayab
Her Highness	Balwant Bhatt	Prakash, Dilawar, Sarla Devi, Jankidas, Mehndi Raza	Action	Music: Harishchandra Bali; Lyrics:
Hoor-e-Baghdad	A. M. Khan	Leela Pande, Shiraz, Mumtaz, Anwaribai, Fazlu Devraj	Costume	Music: Damodar Sharma; Lyrics: F. M. Pindavi
Hoor-e-Jungle	Jaswant Jhaveri	Shabnam, Shyam Sunder, Ashiq Hussain	Action	Music: Ram Gopal Pandey; Lyrics: A. Karim
Humjoli	Ismail Memon	Noor Jehan, P. Jairaj, Ghulam Mohammed, Agha, Mukri, Jilloo	Social	Music: Hafiz Khan; Lyrics: Anjum Pilibhiti
Hum Ek Hain	P.L. Santoshi	Dev Anand, Rehana, Rehman, Alka Achrekar, Ranjit Kumari, Rane, Kamla Kotnis, Durga Khote, Ram Singh	Social	Music: Husnlal Bhagatram; Lyrics: P. L. Santoshi
Inam	Tara Harish	Latika, Harishchandra Rao, Nazira, Ram Kamlani, Munshi Shyam, Bibijan	Action	Music: Baldev Nayak; Lyrics: Munshi Shyam
Insaaf a.k.a. Justice	Phani Majumdar	Swarnalata, Balraj Sahni, Navin Yagnik, Noor Mohammed Charlie, Sunalini Devi, David, K. C. Dey	Social	Music: H. P. Das; Lyrics: D. N. Madhok
Jadugar	Anand Prasad Kapoor	Master Vithal, Putli, Nurjehan, Athavale, Varne	Fantasy	Music: Dinkar S Bidkar; Lyrics:
Jadui Putli	Ramanlal Desai	Navinchandra, Basant Malini, Moni Chatterjee, Kalavati, Narhari Narayan Joshi	Fantasy	Music: Indravadan Bhatt; Lyrics: Neelkanth Tiwari
Jag Biti	M. Sadiq	Suraiya, Shakir, Sadiq Ali, Sulochana Chatterjee, Himalayawala, Ibrahim, Shalini, Ghulam Hussain, Nalini	Social Drama	Music: Ghulam Haider; Lyrics: Shams Lucknavi, Nazim Panipati, Husaini
Jamna Par	A. R. Zamindar	Mehru, Raja Salim, Maqbul, Habib, Samson	Social	Music: Nisar Bazmi; Lyrics: Shewan Rizvi, Vinod Sharma, Haneef Khumar
Jeb Katra	Nari Ghadiali	Navin Yagnik, Rajrani, Samson, Ali, Habib	Action	Music: Nisar Bazmi; Lyrics: Ehsan Rizvi, Shams Lakhnavi
Jeevan Chhaya a.k.a. Kul Kalank	Nanubhai Vakil	Shanta Hublikar, Masood, Shahzadi, Majid, Dulari, W. M. Khan, Saroj Borkar	Social	Music: Allah Rakha; Lyrics: Roopbani
Jeevan Swapna	A. Karim	Naseem Banu, Trilok Kapoor, Leela Pawar, N. A. Ansari, Sadiq Ali, Ahmed	Social	Music: Hafiz Khan Mastana; Lyrics:
Jeevan Yatra	Master Vinayak	Nayantara, Baburao Pendharkar, Yakub, Sunalini Devi, Pratima Devi, Shantarin, Sundarabai	Social	Music: Vasant Desai; Lyrics: Deewan Sharar
Jhumke	J.K. Nanda	Gajanan Jagirdar, Lalita Pawar, Satish, Akhtar	Social	Music: Pandit Amarnath; Lyrics: Sharma, Latif
Jina Sikho	Heera Singh	Shobha Devi, Baburao Pendharkar, Shalini, Nandrekar	Social	Music: Hanuman Prasad; Lyrics:
Jungle Ka Sher	Harbans	Shanta Patel, Baburao Pehalwan, Roshan, Ghory, Mirajkar	Action	Music: Damodar Sharma; Lyrics: Harbans
Jungle Ki Pukar	Ramji Arya	Shankar Vazare, Ameena Khatoon, Mohammed Hussain, Amit Roy, Usha, Ravikant	Action	Music: S. Bannerjee, G. Goswami; Lyrics: Indeevar

== K-L ==
Title	Director	Cast	Genre	Notes
Kahan Gaye	Niranjan	Geeta Bali, Chand Burke	Social	Music: Lachchhiram Tamar, Anupam Ghatak; Lyrics:
Kamala	Chimanlal Trivedi	Leela Desai, Nandrekar, Gulab, Agha, Badri Prasad	Social	Music: Gyan Dutt; Lyrics: Swami Ramanand Saraswati, Neelkanth Tiwari
Kangoo	G. Karim	Mahapatra, Sadiq Ali, Qamar, Anwar Sultan	Action	Music: Mohammed Shafi; Lyrics: C. M. Hunar, Shewan Rizvi, Pandit Taresh
Kashmir Ki Kali	Jagannath Dhar	Master Vithal, Kavita Devi, Mehrunissa, Vasantrao Pehalwan, Gouri Shankar, Varne, Devaskar,		Music: A Karim; Lyrics: Matwala Pandit
Keemat	Nazeer Ajmeri	Amar, Sulochana Chatterjee, A. Shah, Badri Prasad, Sofia, Sharda, Nawab, Anwaribai	Social	Music: Naushad; Lyrics: Majrooh Sultanpuri
Khamosh Nigahen	Moti B. Gidwani	Manorama, Al Nasir, Zahur Shah, Pran, Subhasini,	Drama	Music: Vinod; Lyrics: Aziz Kashmiri
Khan Saheb	Prem Sethna	Master Mohan, Dalsukh, Patience Cooper, Narmada Shankar	Social	Music: Lyrics:
Khooni	K. L. Khan	Raj Rani, Dilawar, Baburao Pendharkar, Arun, Ali, Nawaz	Action	Music: M. Sagir Asif, K. Narayana Rao; Lyrics: Fiza Shahjahanpuri, Bashar Dehlvi, Shewan Rizvi, Preetam
Khush Naseeb	Vithaldas Panchotia	Rukmini Devi, Padma Devi, Vithaldas Panchotia, Indira, Gulab, Agha	Social	Music: Anupam Ghatak, Lachhiram Tamar; Lyrics:
Kismat Ka Dhani	Ramanlal Desai	Navinchandra, Indira, Agha, Kalavati, Gulab	Social	Music: Ramanlal Desai; Lyrics:
Krishna Leela	Debaki Bose	Paresh Bannerjee, Kanan Devi, Hiralal, Ranjit Roy	Devotional	Music: Kamal Dasgupta; Lyrics: Faiyyaz Hashmi, M N Pran
Kuldeep	N. Vaswani	Tasneem, Vijay Mohini, Madan Puri, Bhudo Advani	Social	Music: Sushant Bannerjee; Lyrics: Nava Naqvi
Laaj	Shazada Ayaz	Radharani, Shamim, Ramesh	Social	Music: Ramchandra Pal; Lyrics: Sagar Nizami
Laat Saheb	K.P. Bhave	Latika, Gope, Harishchandra, Khatun, Dalpat, Bibijan	Social	Music: Baldev Nayak; Lyrics: Munshi Shyam
Lady Robinhood	R. N. Vaidya	Fearless Nadia, Prakash, Shanta Patel	Action	Music: Chitragupta; Lyrics: A. Karim

== M-O ==
Title	Director	Cast	Genre	Notes
Maa Baap Ki Laaj	Nanabhai Bhatt	Swarnalata, Jayant, Nazir, Kusum Deshpande, Majid, Anwaribai, Gulab	Family Drama	Music: A R Qureshi; Lyrics:
Maaf Kijiyega	Nari Ghadiali	Prakash, Shanta Patel, Dalpat, Bibijan, Munchi Tuthi	Social	Music: K. Narayana Rao; Lyrics: Mustafa Usman
Magadraj	R.S. Choudhury	Chandra Mohan, Leela Desai, Mumtaz Shanti, Baburao Pendharker, Firoz Dastur, Sulochana Chatterjee	Epic Drama	Music: Bulo C. Rani; Lyrics: Pandit Indra
Magic Cap a.k.a. Jadui Topi	J. Arastani	Shankar Rao, Putli, Azurie, Dongre	Fantasy Action	Music: Master Vasant Mansoor; Lyrics:
Maharana Pratap	Jayant Desai	Khursheed, Ishwarlal, Mubarak, Sita Devi, Rewashanker, Nurjahan, Bhagwandas	Historical	Music: Ram Ganguly; Lyrics: Swami Ramanand
Maharani Minaldevi	Chimanlal Trivedi	Leela Desai, Prem Adib, Durga Khote, Moni Chatterjee, Jagdish Sethi, Sankatha Prasad, Ghulam Rasool		Music: Saraswati Devi; Lyrics: Neelkanth Tiwari, Swami Ramanand Saraswati
Mansarovar	Mahesh Chandra	Nishi Baran, David, Kanhaiyalal, Lakshman, Baby Nirmala	Devotional	Music: S. N. Tripathi; Lyrics: Deepak, I. C. Kapoor
Mera Geet	Shanti Kumar	Naseem Banu, Sushil Kumar, Mukri, Leela Pawar, Athavale, Shalini, Kesari, Mehndi Raza	Social	Music: Shankar Rao Vyas; Lyrics: Ramesh Gupta
Milan	Nitin Bose	Dilip Kumar, Mira Misra, Ranjana, Pahari Sanyal, Moni Chatterjee, S. Nazeer	Social Drama	Music: Anil Biswas; Lyrics: Pyare Lal Santoshi, Arzu Lakhnavi
Mohabbat Ki Duniya	Nanubhai Vakil	Zubeida, B. Dessa, Yousuf	Romance	Music: Dinkar S. Bidkar, S. K. Qadri; Lyrics: Lalchand Falak
Nai Maa	Kant J. Parmar	Ranjana, Jeevan, Rajkumari, Shukla	Family Drama	Music: Hanuman Prasad; Lyrics: Ramesh Gupta
Namumkin	Nari Ghadiali	Prakash, Sharda, Chandrika, Sadiq, Tun Tun, Shagun, Faqir Mohammed	Action	Music: Ayub Khan; Lyrics: A. Karim
Nargis	D.D. Kashyap	Nargis, Rehman, Shah Nawaz, David, Alka Achrekar, Pratima Devi	Social	Music: Husnlal Bhagatram; Lyrics: Qamar Jalalabadi
Neecha Nagar	Chetan Anand	Kamini Kaushal, Uma Anand, Rafiq Ahmed, Rafi Peer, Zohra Sehgal	Socialist realism	Won the Palme d'Or. Music: Ravi Shankar; Lyrics: Vishwamitra Adil, Manmohan Anand
Neera Aur Nanda	R. S. Junnarkar	Nishi Baran, Jaysinha, Shashi, Rupbasant, A. Chandrakant, Baby Naseem	Social	Music: Pandit Shankar; Lyrics: Brajendra Gaud
Nehle Pe Dehla	Hansraj Patel	E. Bilimoria, Shanta Patel, Prakash, Samson	Action	Music: Ravi Raj; Lyrics:
Nek Pervin	S. M. Yusuf	Ragini, Yakub, Ulhas, Yashodhara Katju, Masud, W. M. Khan	Family Drama	Music: Firoz Nizami; Lyrics: Waheed Qureshi
Nishana	K. L. Khan	Navinchandra, Radharani, Sadiq, Mannan, Razi	Action	Music: Sagir Asif; Lyrics: Anwar Murad Anari, Sagir Asif, Fida Shahjahanpuri
Noor-e-Arab a.k.a. Tilasmi Heera	A. M. Khan	Yashwant Dave, Ameena, Bhim, Sultan Alam, Dalpat, Mannan, Devasker, A. M. Ansari	Fantasy	Music: S. Habib; Lyrics: : Ehsan Rizvi, Qaiser Jafri
Omar Khaiyyam	Mohan Sinha	K. L. Saigal, Suraiya, Wasti, Shakir, Leela, Muammil, Madan Puri, Benjamin	Fictionalized Biopic	Music: Lal Mohammed; Lyrics: Safdar Aah

== P-R ==
Title	Director	Cast	Genre	Notes
Panditji	G. R. Durrani	Surekha, Nawaz, Ghulam Rasool, Agha, Mumtaz	Social	Music: Khan Aziz; Lyrics:
Panihari	Gunjal	Surendra, Shanta Apte, Yakub, Urmila, Kanhaiyalal, Gulab, Leela Mishra	Social	Music: S. N. Tripathi, Ali Hussain; Lyrics: Rammurti Chaturvedi, Brajendra Gaud, Pandit Indra
Paraye Bas Mein	Daud Chand	Zubeida, Zahur Shah, Pran, Asha Posley, Ramlal, Mala	Social Drama	Music: Niyaaz Hussain Shami, Vinod; Lyrics: Aziz Kashmiri, Tufail Hoshiarpuri
Pehchan	P.C. Barua	P. C. Barua, Ahindra Chowdhary, Jumna Barua, Robin Majumdar, Maya Bannerjee, Indu Mukherjee	Social	Music: Kamal Dasgupta; Lyrics: Munir Alam, Faiyyaz Hashmi
Phir Bhi Apna Hai	Raja Nene	Nalini Jaywant, Jagdish Sethi, Kusum Deshpande, Sunalini Devi, Saroj Borkar, Paresh Bannerjee	Social	Music: : Ramchandra Pal; Lyrics: Mukhram Sharma Ashant
Phoolwari	Chaturbhuj Doshi	Motilal, Khursheed, Madhubala, Tiwari, Dixit, Nazira	Social	Music: Hansraj Behl; Lyrics: Pandit Indra
Prem Ki Duniya	Jyotish Bannerjee	Alaknanda, Chhabi Biswas, Ahindra Choudhury, Kalpana	Social	Music: Subaldas Gupta; Lyrics:
Prithviraj Samyogita	Najam Naqvi	Prithviraj Kapoor, Neena, Bharat Vyas, Tiwari, Neelam, Shyama, Ram Avtar	Historical Romance Drama	Music: S. K. Pal; Lyrics: Josh Malihabadi, Akhtar ul Iman, Bharat Vyas
Pujari	Aspi Irani	Mumtaz Shanti, Masood, Baby Mumtaz, Yashwant Dave, Bipin Gupta	Social	Music: Hansraj Beh First film Lyrics: Wali Sahab and Pandit Indra
Rajputani	Aspi Irani	P. Jairaj, Veena, Bipin Gupta, Ghulam Mohammed, Baby Mumtaz: Madhubala, Altaf, Noori, Usha Rani	Costume Drama	Music: Bulo C. Rani; Lyrics: Pandit Indra
Rangbhoomi	Mohan Dayaram Bhavnani	Nigar Sultana, K. N. Singh, Jagdish Sethi, Sulochana Chatterjee, Maqbul, Navin Yagnik, Gope, Leela Mishra, Amir Banu	Social	Music: Premnath; Lyrics: Arzoo Lakhnavi
Rasili	Hanuman Prasad	Radharani, Sushil Kumar, Anant Prabhu, Ranibala, Kanhaiyalal, Ramesh Gupta	Social Drama	Music: Hanuman Prasad; Lyrics: Ghaafil Harnaalvi
Rehana	Harbans	Manorama, Pran, Salim Raza, Ramesh, Majnu, Asha, Leela	Action	Music: Qadir Fareedi; Lyrics: Tufail Hoshiarpuri, Aziz Kashmiri
Reporter	D.S. Potdar	Ali, Benjamin, Bibìjan, Phoolrani, Dilawar, Vithaldas Panchoti, Azurie, D. S. Salvi, Putli	Action	Music: Master Vasant Mansoor; Lyrics:
Room No. 9	Vedi	Shyam, Geeta Nizami, K. N. Singh, Saroj Borkar, Ranjit, Randhir	Social	Music: Rasheed Atre; Lyrics: Nakshab Jarchvi
Royal Mail	Nari Ghadiali	Yashwant Dave, Husn Banu, Roopa, Chandrika, Habib	Action	Music: K. Narayana Rao; Lyrics: Mustafa Nisar Usmani
Rukmini Swayamvar	Baburao Painter	Durga Khote, Baburao Pendharkar, Master Vithal, Ratnamala, Devasker, D. S. Salvi	Mythology	Music: Vasudev, Sudhir Phadke; Lyrics:
Rupa	Nazir	Surekha, Ratanmala, Biman Banerjee, Agha, Jilloo	Social	Music: Gobind Ram; Lyrics: Rammurti Chaturvedi, I. C. Kapoor

== S-Z ==
Title	Director	Cast	Genre	Notes
Saathi	M. Sadiq	Mehtab, E. Ismail, Sadiq Ali, Badri Prasad, Gulab, Majid, Jyoti	Social	Music: Gulshan Sufi; Lyrics: Wali Sahab
Safar	Bibhuti Mitra	Kanu Roy, Shobha, V. H. Desai, Rajinder Singh, Haroon, S. L. Puri	Social	Music: C. Ramchandra; Lyrics: Gopal Singh Nepali
Salgirah	K. S. Daryani	P. Jairaj, Snehprabha Prdhan, Kumar, Gope, Pramila, Bibbo	Social	Music: Bulo C. Rani; Lyrics: Wali Sahab
Santan	B. Damania, Ram Prakash	Benjamin, Rehana, Lalita Pawar, David, Zeb Qureshi, Sumati Gupte	Social	Music: Ramchandra Pal; Lyrics: Anjum Pilibhiti
Sassi Punnu	Jagatrai Pesumal Advani	P. Jairaj, Geeta Nizami, E. Bilimoria, Gope, Bibbo, Yashodhra Katju, Majid	Legend Romance	Music: Gobind Ram; Lyrics: I. C. Kapoor
Sati Seeta	H. M. Reddy	Padmavati Shaligram, B. R. Tandon, Sundar Rao, Bhagwan Das, Sundaribai, Master Mohammed	Religious	Music: Master Mohammed; Lyrics: L Lalchand Falak
Shah-e-Misr	G. R. Sethi	Ajit, Geeta Bose, Abdul, Meghmala, Hamid	Costume	Music: Shanti Kumar; Lyrics: Roopbani
Shahi Khazana	S. Usman	Madhurika Devi, Sardar Mansur, Elizer, Violet Cooper	Action	Music: Vasant Kumar Naidu; Lyrics: Ehsan Elahi
Shaher Se Door	Barkat Mehra	Al Nisar, Meena Shorey, Om Prakash, Irshad, Ajmal, Durga Mota	Social	Music: Pandit Amarnath; Lyrics: D. N. Madhok
Shahjehan	Abdul Rashid Kardar	K. L. Saigal, Ragini, Nasreen, P. Jairaj, Afzal, Anwari, Sulochana Chatterji, Azurie	Fictionalised history, Romance, Drama	Music: Naushad; Lyrics: Majrooh Sultanpuri
Shalimar	Roop K. Shorey	Begum Para, Al Nasir, Chandra Mohan, Manorama, Amanath, Zahur Shah, Majnu	Fantasy	Music: Pandit Amarnath, Anupam Ghatak, Lachhiram Tamar; Lyrics: Aziz Kashmiri
Sham Savera	M. Sadiq	Swarnalata, Rafiq Ghaznavi, Wasti, Sulochana Chatterjee, Pratima Devi, Badri Prasad	Social	Music: Pandit Amarnath; Lyrics: D. N. Madhok, Nazim Panipati
Shama	Adi F. Keeka, Abdul Majid, R. Khambata	Mehtab, Prakash, Wasti, Chanda, Abu Bakar	Social Drama	Music: Ghulam Haider; Lyrics: Shams Lucknavi
Shatranj	Vaju Kotak	Gajanan Jagirdar Leela Chitnis, Krishnakant, Amritlal, Padma Banerjee, Nand Kishore	Social	Music: Madhav Lal, Baldev Nayak; Lyrics: G M Madhup
Sher-E-Baghdad	Homi Wadia	Fearless Nadia, John Cawas, Sardar Mansur, Sona Chatterjee, Atish Sayani, Master Mohammed, Sardar Mansur, Dalpat,		Music: Master Mohammed; Lyrics:
Shikari	Savak Vacha	Ashok Kumar, Veera, Paro Devi, Kishore Kumar, S. L. Puri, Leela Mishra, V. H. Desai, Rama Shukal	Drama	Music: S. D. Burman; Lyrics: Kavi Pradeep
Shravan Kumar	Ram Daryani	Menaka Devi, Pahari Sanyal, Mumtaz Shanti, Chandra Mohan, K. C. Dey, Gope, Gulab	Mythology	Music: Bulo C. Rani; Lyrics: Wali Sahab
Silver Queen	Raja Yagnik	Madhuri, Navinchandra, Bibijan, Agha, Dalpat, Devasker	Action	Music: S. Habib; Lyrics: Ehsan Rizvi
Sinbad The Sailor	Nanubhai Vakil, Amulakh Desai	Prakash, Shanta Patel, Mumtaz	Fantasy	Music: S. Qureshi; Lyrics: Muztar Behzadi, Roopbani
Sofia	G. S. Devare	Ibrahim, Noortanha, Sunder, Fatima, Tiwari, Vithaldas Panchotia	Action	Music: R Ramnathkar; Lyrics: Munshi Aashiq
Sohni Mahiwal	Ishwarlal, Ravindra Jaykar	Ishwarlal, Begum Para, Bibijan, Mubarak, Dixit, Rewashanker, Shobha		Music: Lyrics:
Sona Chandi	R. D. Pareenja	Kamala, Chandni, Kishori, Ghulam Rasool, Haroon, Saroj Borkar, Kathana	Sona Chandi	Music: Tufail Faruqui, D C Dutt; Lyrics: Wali Sahab, Khawar Zaman, Shamim
Subhadra	Master Vinayak	Prem Adib, Shanta Apte, Ishwarlal, Yakub Meenaxi, Usha Mantri	Mythology	Music: Vasant Desai; Lyrics: Moti
Suleh	Apurba Kumar Mitra	Ahindra Choudhury, Biman Bannerjee, Mrinal Kanti Ghosh, Manorama, Devbala, Bipin Gupta, Tulsi Chakraborty	Social	Music: Anil Bagchi; Lyrics: Narottam Vyas
Swadesh Sewa	Nagendra Majumdar	N. Majumdar, Madhav Kale, Gauhar Karnataki, David, Athavale	Social	Music: Lyrics: Dhaniram Prem
Talwarwala	Nagendra Majumdar	Master Vithal, Noor Jehan, Dinkar, Azurie	Action Drama	Music: Dinkar; Lyrics:
Tassavvur	Premkishan Jani	Anjum Aaga, Adil jaan, Noor-Jahan, Nandan	Drama	Music: Shamji Gupta, Mirza Baig Lyrics: Risu Sahay
Tilasmi Duniya	A. M. Khan	Sarla Devi, Shiraz, S, Kulkarni, Ansari, Madhukar Gupte, Rampyari	Social	Music: Sajjad Hussain; Lyrics: Hamid Hyderabadi, Madhup Sharma
Toofan Queen	Ramnik Vaidya	Fearless Nadia, Prakash, Agha, Shanta Patel, Shyam Sunder	Action	Music: Chitragupta; Lyrics: Shyam HIndi
Tum Aur Main	Apurba Kumar Mitra	Kanan Devi, Talat Mehmood, Manorama, Chhabi Biswas, Purnima, Paresh Bandhopadhyay, Sabita Devi, Sandhyarani	Drama	Music: Robin Chatterjee; Lyrics: Zaakir Hussain
Urvashi	Babubhai Jani	Shobhana Samarth, Prem Adib, Suraiya, S. B. Nayampalli, Nandkishore		Music: Ramchandra Pal, Paigankar, Shyam Sundar Lyrics: Pandit Raghuvir
Uttara Abhimanyu	Sarvottam Badami	Ashok Kumar, Chhaya Devi, Shahu Modak, Shanta Apte, S. N. Tripathi	Mythology	Music: S. N. Tripathi; Lyrics: Roopdas, Saraswati Kumar Deepak
Valmiki	Bhalji Pendharkar	Prithviraj Kapoor, Shanta Apte, Pratima Devi, Vinay Kale, Leela, Prabhakar, Pratima Devi, Vinay Kale, Baburao Pendharkar	Biopic	Music: Shankar Rao Vyas; Lyrics: Mahesh Gupta
Wamaq Azra	Nazir Ajmeri	Swarnalata, Nazir Ahmed Khan, Prakash, W. M. Khan, M. Esmail, Kusum Deshpande	Costume	Music: A R Qureshi; Lyrics: Tanveer Naqvi
Zameen Aasmaan	Dwarka Khosla	Ranjana, Jeevan, Om Prakash, Kusum Deshpande, Athavale	Social	Music: Kamal Dasgupta; Lyrics: Faiyyaz Hashmi
