= Durga Khote =

Indian actress (1905–1991)

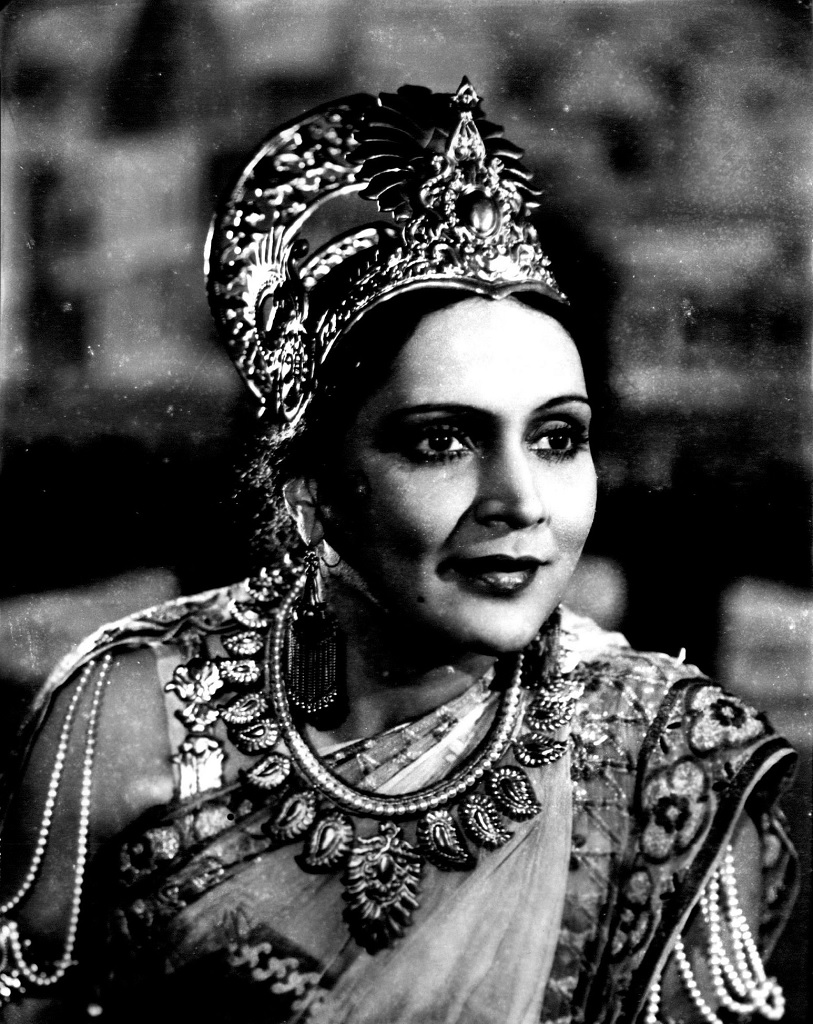
- Khote in Prithvi Vallabh (1943)
- Born: Vita Lad; 14 January 1905; Bombay, Bombay Presidency, British India (present-day Mumbai, Maharashtra, India)
- Died: 22 September 1991 (aged 86); Bombay, Maharashtra, India (present-day Mumbai)
- Education: Cathedral High School
- Alma mater: St. Xavier's College, Mumbai (BA)
- Occupations: Actress; film producer
- Years active: 1931–1983
- Spouse: Vishwanath Khote
- Family: Viju Khote (nephew); Shubha Khote (niece); Bhavna Balsavar (grand-niece)
- Awards: BFJA Award for Best Actress; Filmfare Award for Best Supporting Actress
- Honours: Padma Shri (1968); Maharashtra State Award (1970); Dadasaheb Phalke Award (1983)

Durga Khote (née Vita Lad; 14 January 1905 − 22 September 1991) was an Indian actress, beginning as one of the foremost leading ladies of her time. She remained active in Hindi and Marathi cinema and theatre for over 50 years, starring in around 200 films and numerous theatre productions.

In 2000, in a millennium issue, India Today named her among "100 People Who Shaped India", noting: "Durga Khote marks the pioneering phase for women in Indian Cinema". She was one of the first women from respectable families to enter the film industry, thus breaking a social taboo.

She also ranks among the top ten actresses in mother roles in Hindi cinema, most notable among them being her portrayal of Jodhabai in K. Asif's Mughal-e-Azam (1960), which earned her a nomination for the Filmfare Award for Best Supporting Actress, and as Kaikeyi in Vijay Bhatt's classic Bharat Milap (1942). Her other memorable roles as mother were in Charnon Ki Dasi (1941); Mirza Ghalib (1954); Bobby (1973) and Bidaai (1974), winning the Filmfare Award for Best Supporting Actress for the lattermost. She has received the highest award in Indian cinema, the Dadasaheb Phalke Award (1983), for lifetime contribution to Indian cinema.

== Early life ==
Khote was born as Vita Lad to a Konkani Brahmin family which hailed from Goa and spoke Konkani at home. Her father's name was Pandurang Shamrao Lad and her mother's name was Manjulabai. She grew up in a large Hindu joint family in Kandewadi. She was educated at Cathedral High School and St. Xavier's College where she studied for a Bachelor of Arts degree. While still a college-going teenager, she married into the Khote family and settled down with her husband Vishwanath Khote.

By the age of 26, Durga Khote was a widowed mother with two young sons; Bakul and Harin. She had to seek work in film to support her children. In doing so, she became a pioneer of sorts: She hailed from a traditional family and the film industry was regarded as the preserve of the base and the bawdy. Also, most of the female characters were played by men at the time.

== Career ==
=== Early career ===
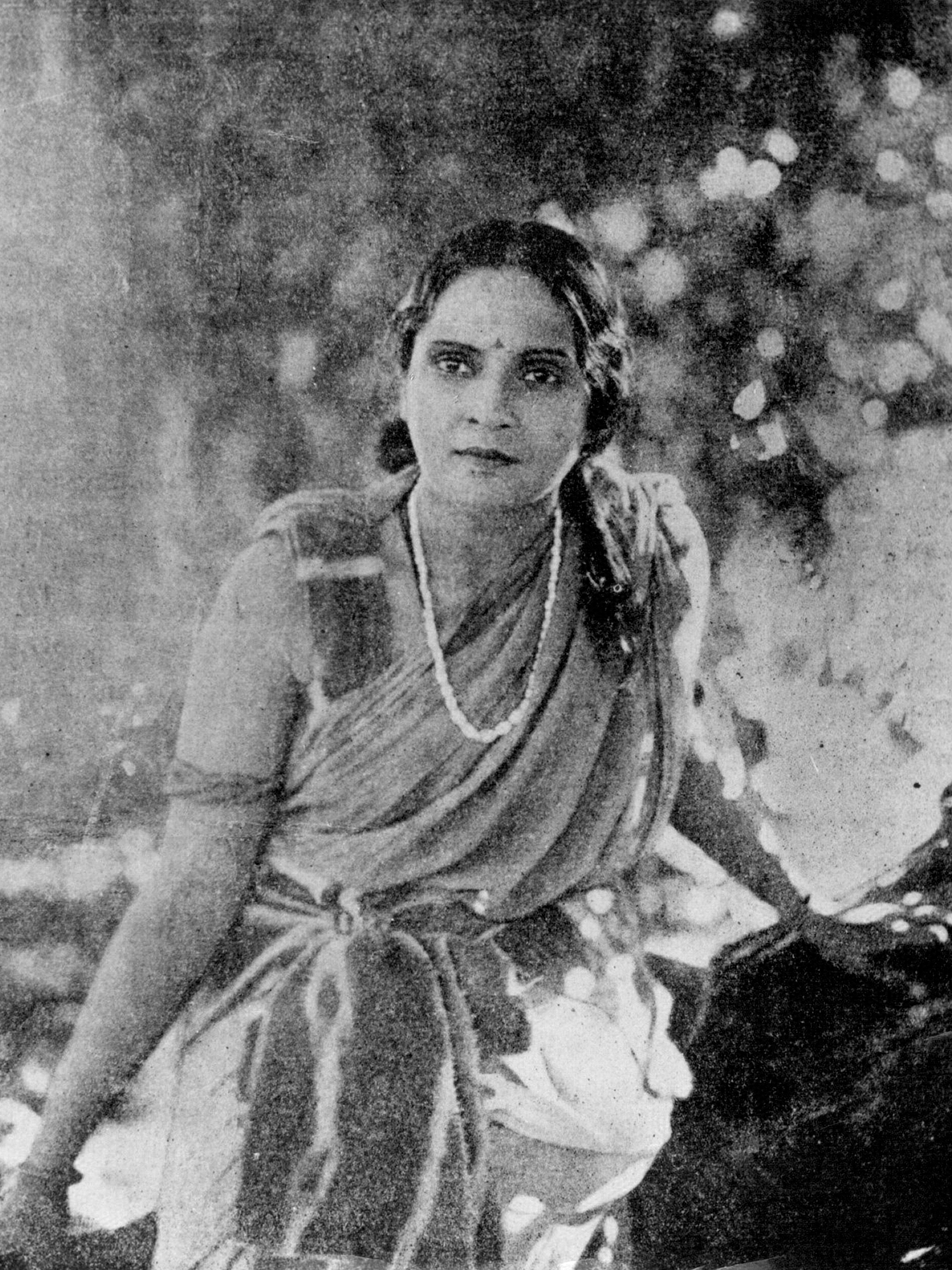
Khote in Seeta (1934).

Durga Khote debuted in a minor role in the obscure 1931 silent film Farebi Jaal, by the Prabhat Film Company, followed by Maya Machindra (1932). She was soon promoted to play heroine in the 1932 double version (Hindi and Marathi) Ayodhyecha Raja, another Prabhat film, which was the first ever Marathi talkie, and proved to be a runaway hit, where she played the role of Rani Taramati. Indeed, she ventured yet another pioneering trend: Despite working closely with the Prabhat Film Company, she broke away from the "studio system" (exclusive contract with a studio to work in its films on a monthly salary) then in vogue and became one of the first "freelance" artistes of that era by working occasionally with the New Theatres, East India Film Co. (both at Calcutta), and Prakash Pictures.

In 1936, she played Saudamini in Amar Jyoti, which is one of her most memorable roles. The characters played by her were very much like her regal personality and she commanded a screen presence even in front of legendary actors like Chandra Mohan, Sohrab Modi and Prithviraj Kapoor.

In 1937, she produced and directed a film titled Saathi, making her one of the first women to step into this role in Indian cinema. The 40s opened for her in a big way, with award-winning performances in Aachary Atre's Payachi Dasi (Marathi) and Charnon Ki Dasi (Hindi) (1941) and Vijay Bhatt's classic Bharat Milap (1942), both of which got her the BFJA Best Actress Award for two consecutive years.

Durga Khote remained active in the theatre circuit for many years, especially the Marathi theatre in Mumbai. She was actively associated with the Indian People's Theatre Association (IPTA) and worked in several plays for the Mumbai Marathi Sahitya Sangh. In 1954, she famously performed the role of Lady Macbeth in V.V. Shirwadkar's Marathi adaptations of Macbeth, as Rajmukut, The Royal Crown, along with Nanasaheb Phatak.

=== Later career ===
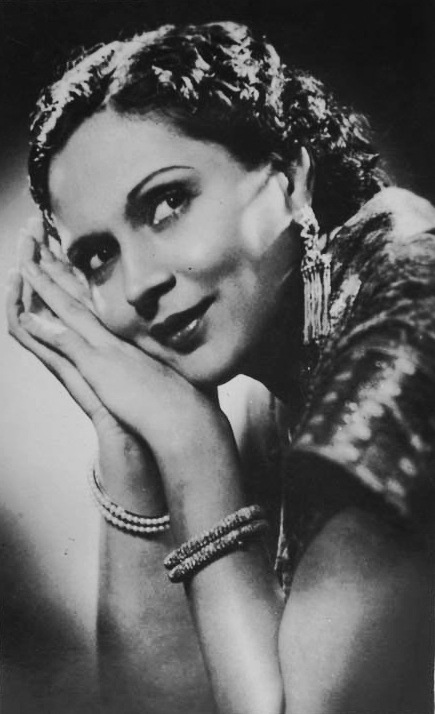

Durga Khote played a wide variety of roles over a career that was not only long, but also untouched by scandal. She was the inspiration for several generations of Indian actresses, including veterans such as the late Shobhna Samarth, who frequently spoke of how she had been inspired by Khote's example.

During later years, she played several important character roles, such as the mother of the protagonist. Her portrayal of Jodhabai, the queen of Akbar torn between duty towards her husband and love towards her son in Mughal-e-Azam (1960) was highly acclaimed and earned her a nomination for the Filmfare Award for Best Supporting Actress. In 1963, she acted in Merchant Ivory's debut film The Householder (1963).

She went on to play other widely appreciated character roles in later movies, such as the role of the grandmother of the heroine in Bobby (1973), the hero's aunt in Abhimaan (1973), and the very memorable Bidaai (1974), where she played a mother, which earned her the Filmfare Award for Best Supporting Actress.

Her final memorable role was in Subhash Ghai's Karz (1980), where she played the role of the mother of Raj Kiran and later, mother to Rishi Kapoor, who played the role of Raj Kiran's reincarnation after the screen death of Raj Kiran in the film.

She acted in over 200 films in her career. By the 1980s she successfully diversified into production of short films, ad films and documentaries by setting up Fact Films and later, Durga Khote Productions, which produced the Doordarshan TV series Wagle Ki Duniya.

== Personal life ==
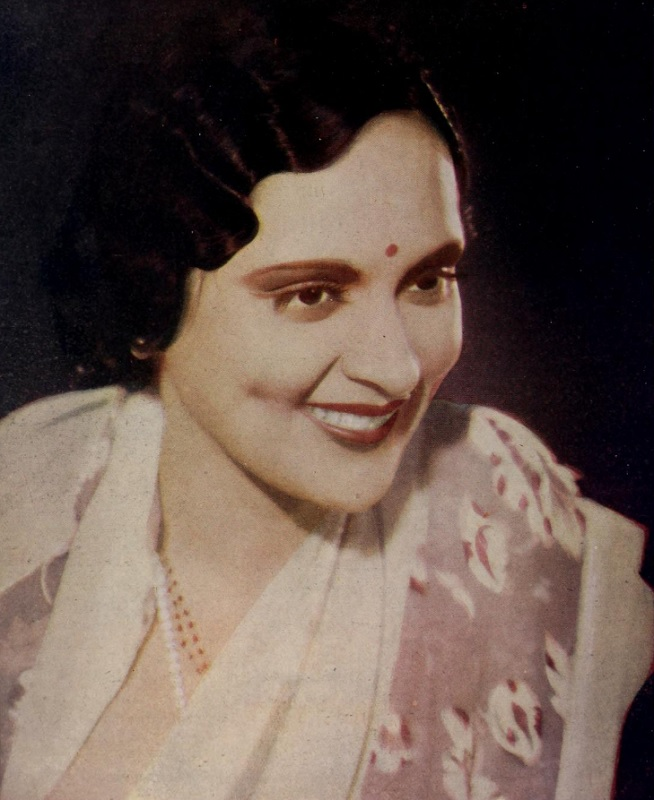
Khote in 1938

Durga Khote was married when she was a teenager to Vishwanath Khote, of her own caste and similar social background, in a match arranged by their parents. It was a traditional marriage into an orthodox family, and the couple lived a harmonious and happy life. They had two sons. Vishwanath was a mechanical engineer who had graduated from Banaras Hindu University. His family was upper middle class, with modern English education and high social standing; his ancestors had been prominent bankers.

Unfortunately, Vishwanath Khote died young, when Durga was 26. She and her sons continued to reside with her in-laws, as is traditional in India, but she was not comfortable with her dependent, especially because her father-in-law was no more, and they were dependent on other family members financially. She thus felt compelled to make a living any which way she could, and the opening in films happened entirely by chance. The fact that she came from a modern and English-educated family meant that, even as a widow, she was able to act in films, which was derided as a disreputable profession in those days.

She thus raised her two sons, Bakul and Harin, single-handedly. Both of them went on to be well-settled in life. But she suffered the loss of her son Harin, who predeceased her and died in his 40s. Harin was married to Vijaya Jaywant, and they were the parents of two sons. After Harin's early death, his widow married a Parsi man named Farrokh Mehta and became famous as the film-maker Vijaya Mehta.

Durga Khote's grandchildren include her grandson Ravi, a filmmaker; granddaughters Anjali, Rekha and Priya; and grandson Deven Khote, a successful producer who is one of the co-founders of UTV, and who has also directed a film. Deven Khote is noted for producing films such as Jodhaa Akbar and Life in a Metro.

Durga Khote's brother-in-law, Nandu Khote (brother of Vishwanath), was a noted stage and silent movie actor. Two of Nandu's children also became actors in the film industry. His son Viju Khote (1941–2019) was an actor perhaps best known for his role of "Kalia" in Sholay (1975). Nandu's daughter is the actress Shubha Khote, who debuted in Seema (1955) and worked as a heroine in several films before moving to character roles. Still later, she moved to directing and producing Marathi films and also entered television in the '90s. Shubha's daughter, Bhavana Balsavar, is also an award-winning TV actress who appeared in sitcoms like Dekh Bhai Dekh and Zabaan Sambhalke before deciding to settle down and raise a family. Thus, the acting profession which was pioneered by Durga Khote in her family has been embraced by her late husband's family.

Durga Khote also had some rather improbable, distinguished relatives with no connection to films. The socialite and politician Sharda Mukherjee (née Sharada Pandit), who herself served as governor of the states of Gujarat and Andhra Pradesh, and who was the wife of Subroto Mukherjee, India's first Chief of the Air Staff, was Durga Khote's first cousin (her mother's sister's daughter). Sharda Mukherjee's paternal uncle, Ranjit Sitaram Pandit, was the husband of Jawaharlal Nehru's sister Vijayalakshmi Pandit.

Later in life, Durga Khote wrote an autobiography in Marathi, entitled Mee, Durga Khote, which was translated into English as I, Durga Khote, and moved to Alibaug, near Mumbai. Durga Khote died on 22 September 1991.

== Filmography ==
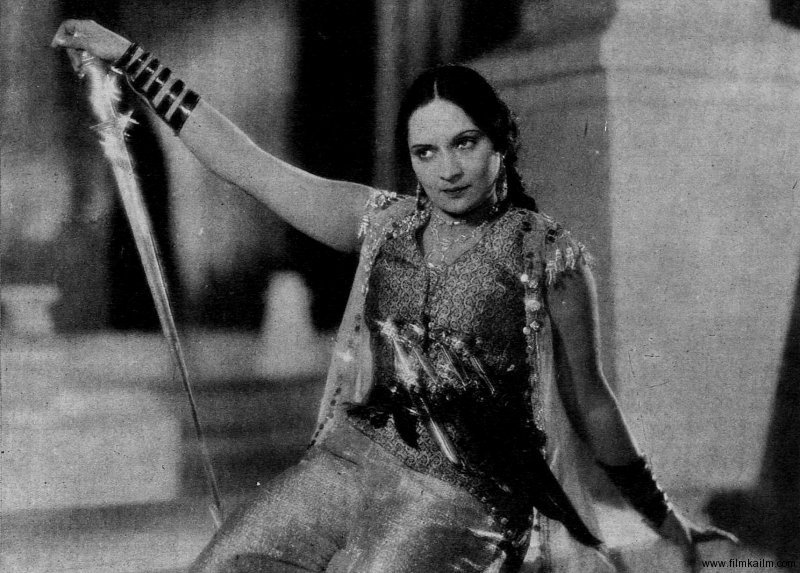
Khote in Amar Jyoti (1936)

Year	Title	Role	Notes
1931	Farebi Jaal		
1932	Ayodhyecha Raja	Taramati	Hindi / Marathi film
1932	Maya Machhindra	Queen	Hindi / Marathi film
1933	Patit Pawan		
1933	Rajrani Meera	Meera	
1934	Seeta	Seeta	
1935	Inquilab	Miss Renee	
1935	Jeevan Natak	Miss Queen	
1936	Amar Jyoti	Saudamini	
1937	Pratibha	Pratibha	
1938	Nandakumar		
1938	Saathi		
1939	Adhuri Kahani	Harbala	
1940	Geeta	Durga	Hindi / Marathi film
1940	Narsi Bhagat	Manekbai	Gujarati / Hindi film
1940	Yamla Jat		
1941	Charnon Ki Dasi	Vidya's mother-in-law	Hindi / Marathi film
1942	Bharat Milap	Maharani Kaikeyi	Hindi / Marathi film
1942	Vijay		
1943	Kurbani		
1943	Mahasati Ansuya		
1943	Mahatma Vidur		
1943	Prithvi Vallabh	Mrinalvati	
1943	Tasveer	Vidya Devi	
1943	Zameen		
1944	Dil Ki Baat		
1944	Maharathi Karna	Kunti	
1945	Gaon Ki Gori		
1945	Lakharani	Bichwa	
1945	Pannadai		
1945	Phool		
1945	Veer Kunal		
1946	Hum Ek Hain	Zamindari Ma	
1946	Maharani Minaldevi		
1946	Rukmini Swayamvar		
1948	Anjuman		
1948	Seeta Sawayamwar		
1949	Jeet	Ratan's mother	
1949	Maya Bazaar		
1949	Singaar	Kishan's Mother	
1950	Alakh Niranjan		
1950	Beqasoor		
1950	Hamara Ghar		
1950	Har Har Mahadev		
1950	Magroor		
1950	Nishana		
1950	Surajmukhi		
1951	Aaram	Sita	
1951	Hamari Shaan		
1951	Hum Log	Mother	
1951	Nai Zindagi		
1951	Nandkishore		
1951	Sazaa		
1952	Aandhiyan		
1952	Hyderabad Ki Nazneen	Mrs. Jwala Prasad	
1952	Lal Kunwar		
1952	Mordhwaj		
1952	Narveer Tanaji		
1952	Sandesh		
1953	Chacha Chowdhury		
1953	Dharma Pathni	Nataraj's Wife	
1953	Malkin		
1953	Mashooka		
1953	Naag Panchami	Rani Sanka	
1953	Naulakha Haar	Devla	
1953	Shikast		
1953	Shri Chaitanya Mahaprabhu		
1954	Laila		
1954	Lakeeren		
1954	Maan		
1954	Mirza Ghalib	Amma, Chaudvin's mother	
1955	Adl-E-Jahangir	Mallika-e-Jahangeer	
1955	Haseena		
1955	Jagadguru Shankaracharya		
1955	Madh Bhare Nain		
1955	Shri Ganesh Vivah		
1956	Dwarikadheesh		
1956	Harihar Bhakti		
1956	Insaaf		
1956	Parivar		
1956	Patrani	Raj Mata	
1956	Rajdhani		
1957	Bade Sarkar	Sumitra Maan Singh	
1957	Bhabhi	Ratan's aunt	
1957	Mera Salaam		
1957	Musafir	Mrs. Nilambar Sharma	
1957	Ram Hanuman Yuddha		
1957	Talaash		
1958	Gopichand		
1959	Ardhangini	Prakash's mom	
1959	Ghar Ghar Ki Baat		
1959	Maine Jeena Seekh Liya		
1959	Raj Tilak		
1960	Love in Simla	Sonia's grandmother	
1960	Mughal-E-Azam	Maharani Jodha Bai	Nominated – Filmfare Award for Best Supporting Actress
1960	Parakh	Rani Ma, J.C. Roy's mother	
1960	Usne Kaha Tha	Paro	
1961	Bhabhi Ki Chudiyan	Prabha's mother	
1961	Do Bhai	Gopi's Mother	
1961	Ek Ladki Saat Ladke		
1961	Kismet Palat Ke Dekh		
1961	Senapati		
1962	Main Shaadi Karne Chala		
1962	Man-Mauji	Dr. Mohan's mother	
1962	Rungoli	Subhagi	
1962	Son of India	Head Nun	
1963	Mujhe Jeene Do	Dhara Khan's Mom	
1963	The Householder	Prem's mother	
1964	Benazir		
1964	Door Ki Awaaz	Prakash's mother	
1964	Kaise Kahoon		
1964	Main Suhagan Hoon		
1964	Shagoon		Uncredited
1964	Tere Dwaar Khada Bhagwan		
1965	Do Dil	Ranimaa	
1965	Janam Janam Ke Saathi		
1965	Kaajal	Rani Sahiba	
1965	Purnima	Sharda R. Lal	
1966	Anupama	Ashok's mother	
1966	Daadi Maa	Daadi Maa / Maharani	
1966	Devar	Gopinath's Mom	
1966	Pyar Mohabbat	Rajmata Rajeshwari	
1966	Sagaai	Sheel's mother	
1967	Chandan Ka Palna	Mrs. Radha Laxmidas	
1968	Jhuk Gaya Aasman	Mrs. Saxena	
1968	Sapno Ka Saudagar	Peter's mother	
1968	Sunghursh	Mrs. Bhawani Prasad	
1969	Dharti Kahe Pukarke	Parvati	
1969	Ek Phool Do Mali	Leela	
1969	Jeene Ki Raah	Janki	
1969	Pyar Ka Sapna	Sudha's mother	
1970	Dhartichi Lekaren		
1970	Gopi	Kunwar's Mother	
1970	Khilona	Thakurain Singh	
1970	Umang	Aunti Ji	Uncredited
1971	Anand	Renu's mother	Guest Appearance
1971	Banphool	Haria's maternal grandma	
1971	Chingari	Mohan's Mother	
1971	Ek Nari Ek Brahmachari	Rajlaxmi S. Chaudhary	
1972	Bawarchi	Sita Sharma	
1972	Mangetar		
1972	Mere Bhaiya	Avinash's mother	
1972	Raja Jani	Rajmata	
1972	Shararat	Harry's mother	
1973	Abhimaan	Durga Mausi	
1973	Agni Rekha	Durga	
1973	Bobby	Mrs. Braganza	
1973	Door Nahin Manzil	Dadima	
1973	Namak Haraam	Somu's mother	
1973	Sone Ke Hath	Vijay Khanna's mother	
1974	Bidaai	Parvati	Won – Filmfare Award for Best Supporting Actress
1974	Dil Diwana	Vijay's Dadimaa	
1974	Insaaniyat	Ram's mother	
1975	Biwi Kiraya Ki		
1975	Chaitali	Manish's mother	
1975	Kala Sona	Mrs. Ranjeet Singh	
1975	Khushboo	Brindaban's mother	
1975	Vandana	Rakesh's Mother	
1976	Jaaneman	Ronnie's mother	
1976	Jai Bajrang Bali	Devi Maa Anjani	
1976	Rangila Ratan		
1976	Shaque	Mrs. Bannerjee	
1977	Chacha Bhatija	Mrs. D'Silva	
1977	Chor Sipahee	Mrs. Khanna, Raja's mother	
1977	Darling Darling		
1977	Do Chehere	Daadima	
1977	Naami Chor		
1977	Paapi	Ashok's mother	
1977	Paheli	Brij Mohan's mother	
1977	Saheb Bahadur	Meena's grandmother	
1980	Karz	Mrs. Shanta Prasad Verma	
1981	Sangdil		
1983	Daulat Ke Dushman	Sunil's mother	(final film role)

== Awards ==
Year	Nominee / work	Award	Result
1942	Charnon Ki Dasi	BFJA Awards: Best Actress	Won
1943	Bharat Milap	BFJA Awards: Best Actress	Won
1958	–	Sangeet Natak Akademi Award	Awarded
1968	–	Padma Shri, fourth highest civilian award by the Government of India.	Awarded
1970	Dhartichi Lekre	Maharashtra State Award	Won
1974	Bidaai	Filmfare Award for Best Supporting Actress	Won
1983	–	Dadasaheb Phalke Award, the lifetime recognition award for films from Government of India	Awarded

== Legacy ==
The Encyclopaedia of Indian Cinema (2014) describes Khote as "the first Marathi star to catapult to All-India film popularity". According to scholars Ashish Rajadhyaksha and Paul Willemen, Khote represented a new kind of actress in 1930s Indian cinema: an educated, upper-class woman who entered films without having to conform to the "Sangeet Natak stereotypes" attached to then-actresses.

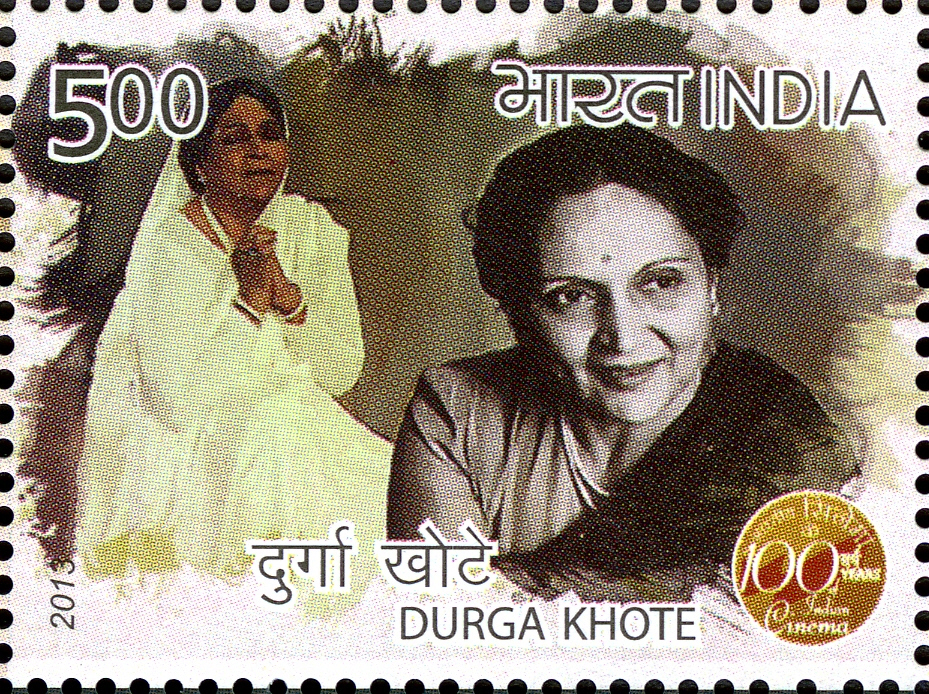
Khote on a 2013 stamp of India

In 2000, India Today's millennium issue named her one of the 100 people who shaped India in the 20th century.

A postage stamp, bearing her face, was released by India Post to honour her on 3 May 2013.
