= Brahmachari (1938 film) =

- Theatrical release poster
- Directed by: Master Vinayak
- Written by: P. K. Atre (story and dialogues for Marathi version); Pandit Indra (dialogues for Hindi version)
- Starring: Master Vinayak; Meenakshi Shirodkar; Damuanna Malvankar; G D Madgulkar
- Cinematography: Pandurang Naik
- Music by: Dada Chandekar
- Release date: 1938
- Country: India
- Languages: Marathi; Hindi

Brahmachari

Brahmachari (transl. Celibate) is a 1938 black and white Marathi film. The film was directed by Master Vinayak and written by Pralhad Keshav Atre and starred Master Vinayak himself along with Meenakshi Shirodkar in lead roles.The film was also made in Hindi language. The film was a major box-office success, running for 25 weeks in Mumbai and 50 weeks in Pune.

Atre paired with Master Vinayak for the second time for this film after the 1937 film Dharmaveer. Apart from the witty dialogues and satirical theme, the film became popular for Shirodkar's seductive song sequence wearing a swimsuit.

== Plot ==
Audumbar is a young and ordinary man. On one occasion he happens to listen to the lecture given by Deshbhakta Jatashankar. Jatashankar in his speech emphasizes discipline and celibacy. This speech inspires Audumbar and he decides to join the Institute of Acharya Chandiram. He renounces his sexual desires and also throws away his collection of posters of film actors.

But at the institute, he comes across Kishori, a young woman and all his vows to Brahmacharya are tested. Kishori tempts Audumbar but Audumbar manages to avoid the temptation. Kishori pretends to hurt herself and calls out Audumbar. Audumbar finally has no choice and carries her. Her father and the townsfolk from the association come and find him carrying Kishori. She screams and the blame comes on Audumbar. Audumbar years later runs a collection of goods from the institute. He once again meets Kishori who appears with one of the members of Acharya Chandiram. He resents and doesn't like her but slowly over time she wins him over. But then Audumbar fights constantly with Kishori. She is left in tears. Her father tries to comfort to no avail. The member who goes with Kishori is attracted to her. He eventually is caught in an allegation that Audumbar tells the chief and Audumbar marries Kishori.

== Cast ==
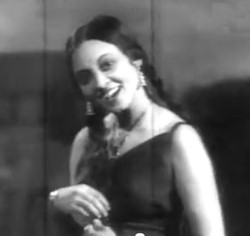
Shirodkar in the swimsuit with twin-plait look as seen in the song "Yamuna Jali Khelu Khel"

- Master Vinayak as Audumbar / Kanhaiya (in Hindi version)
- Meenakshi Shirodkar as Kishori
- Damuanna Malvankar as Acharya Chandiram
- Javdekar as Deshbhakta Jatashankar
- G D Madgulkar
- V.G. Jog
- Dada Salvi
- Vasant Eric

== Production ==
Pralhad Keshav Atre, who had previously published many novels, poems and also written stories and dialogues for films, paired with Master Vinayak for the second time for this film. Previously they had worked together on the 1937 Marathi film Dharmaveer, which was a religious satire.

The film was actress Meenakshi Shirodkar's debut film. She had previously worked in theatre. The film became notable for the song sequence "Yamuna Jali Khelu Khel" where Shirodkar wore a swimsuit. The scene involved the character Kishori trying to seduce Audumbar while bathing on a ghat.

== Reception and legacy ==
The film had dialogues written by Atre, who is known for his sense of humour. His satirical handling of Hindu nationalist organization Rashtriya Swayamsevak Sangh's ideologies in the Marathi medium and Pandit Indra's writing for the Hindi medium brought in audiences. Critics have also credited the success of the film to these strong dialogue writers. Apart from the dialogues, the film's main attraction was Shirodkar's song sequence with the swimsuit that brought repeat audiences and also brought fame to Shirodkar. The film was a hit at the box office and ran for twenty five weeks in Mumbai and for fifty in Pune. The then critics had also criticized the bold song sequence.

After stunning the traditional Marathi audience and despite the criticism for the bold scene, the film brought popularity for Shirodkar. Her twin-plait hairstyle also became popular and trendy among teenage girls. The pair of Master Vinayak and Shirodkar was well received by audiences. The two went on to play successful lead roles in various film like Brandichi Batli (1939), Ardhangi / Ghar Ki Rani (1940), Amrut (1941), Mazhe Bal (1943) and more.

The film was also adapted as a play of same name in 1984. It starred Prashant Damle and Varsha Usgaonkar in lead roles and was directed by Damu Kenkre. The music was revived by Ashok Patki and the popular song "Yamuna Jali Khelu Khel" was still maintained with Usgaonkar now in a swimsuit, trying to seduce Damle. The play proved to be a turning point for the current female lead also. Usgaonkar was noticed by director-actor Sachin Pilgaonkar, who then launched her in films through Gammat Jammat.

The song "Yamuna Jali Khelu Khel" still remains popular. After its use in Kenkre's play, the song was recently also used in the film Pratibimb (2011). Sung by newcomer Sampada Hire, the music was composed by Avadhoot Gupte and was picturised on Ankush Choudhary and Sonali Kulkarni.
