= Pehchaan =

Pehchaan or Pehchan may refer to:

- Pehchan (1946 film), Indian Hindi-language film by P. C. Barua
- Pehchan (1970 film), Indian Hindi-language film by Sohanlal Kanwar, starring Manoj Kumar, Babita, and Balraj Sahni
- Pehchan (1975 film), Pakistani action-drama film
- Pehchaan (1993 film), Indian Hindi-language action thriller film by Deepak S. Shivdasani, starring Suniel Shetty, Saif Ali Khan, Siddharth Ray, Madhoo and Shilpa Shirodkar
- Pehchaan (2009 TV series), 2009 Indian drama series broadcast on DD National
- Pehchaan 3D, 2013 Indian Punjabi-language film
- Pehchaan: The Face of Truth, 2005 Indian Hindi-language drama film by Shrabani Deodhar, starring Vinod Khanna, Rati Agnihotri and Raveena Tandon
- Pehchaan (2006 TV series), 2006 Pakistani drama serial aired on Hum TV directed by Mehreen Jabbar
- Pehchaan (2014 TV series), 2014 Pakistani drama television series aired on A-Plus Entertainment
- "Pehchaan", Indian TV episode of Crime Patrol and Crime Patrol Dial 100
- "Pehchaan", episode of the 2021 Indian TV series Grahan
