= Eveready =

Eveready Everready, or Ever Ready may refer to:

- Eveready Battery Company, a U.S. battery manufacturer which became Energizer Holdings
  - Eveready Industries India, a battery maker in Kolkata once was owned by the above
  - Eveready East Africa, a Kenyan battery maker and seller and affiliate of the above
  - Eveready Australia
    - Dolphin
- British Ever Ready Electrical Company, a battery maker later acquired by Energizer Holdings
- Eveready Inc., a Canadian company acquired by Clean Harbors in 2009
- Everready (The Religion), an album by Tech N9ne
- Ever-Ready, a brand of the American Safety Razor Company
- Ever Ready (film), a 1946 Indian film

== See also ==
- Eveready Harton in Buried Treasure, a 1929 pornographic animated cartoon
