= Dhanwan =

Dhanwan (lit. 'wealthy' or 'rich' in Hindi) may refer to these Indian films:

- Dhanwan (1937 film), a 1937 Hindi social film
- Dhanwan (1946 film), a 1946 Bollywood film
- Dhanwan (1981 film), a 1981 Hindi film
- Dhanwan (1993 film), a 1993 Indian romance film
