= Meenakshi Shirodkar =

Indian actress

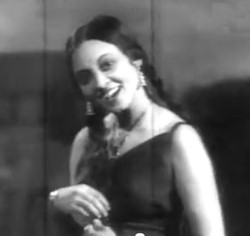
- Meenakshi Shirodkar in Bramhachari (1938)
- Born: Ratan Pednekar; 11 October 1916
- Died: 3 June 1997 (aged 80); Mumbai, Maharashtra, India
- Occupation: Actress
- Known for: Brahmachari
- Spouse: Dr. Shirodkar (m. 1936)
- Relatives: Namrata Shirodkar (granddaughter); Shilpa Shirodkar (granddaughter); Mahesh Babu (grandson-in-law)

Meenakshi Shirodkar (born Ratan Pednekar; 11 October 1916 – 3 June 1997), was an Indian actress who mainly worked in Marathi films, Marathi theatre and television. She made her debut in 1938 and continued to act in films until the early 1970s. Her appearance in a swimsuit in the Marathi film Brahmachari (1938) with Master Vinayak stunned the traditional audience. She is the paternal grandmother of two Bollywood actresses, Namrata Shirodkar and Shilpa Shirodkar.

== Personal life ==
Shirodkar was born Ratan Pednekar on 11 October 1916 to a Maharashtrian family with Goan roots. She started learning Indian classical music at an early age.

In 1936, she married Dr. Shirodkar, with whom she had a son, who married Marathi actress Gangu Bai and became parents of film actresses Namrata Shirodkar and Shilpa Shirodkar. Namrata was crowned Miss India in 1993 and is married to Tollywood actor Mahesh Babu and has two children.

On 4 June 1997, Shirodkar died at the age of 80 in Mumbai.

== Career ==
In 1935, Shirodkar joined All India Radio (AIR) where she worked in radio dramas. After her marriage in 1936, she got a film offer from Pandurang Naik, one of the partners in a film company called Hans Pictures. Though Shirodkar declined the offer in the beginning, Naik convinced Shirodkar's husband that she should make a film debut.

Shirodkar debuted with a 1938 Marathi film Brahmachari, opposite Master Vinayak. The writer of the film Pralhad Keshav Atre, better known as "Āchārya Atre", changed her name from "Ratan" to "Meenaxi" to suit her big eyes. She created a stir by appearing in a swimsuit in the song "Yamuna Jali Khelu Khel" in the film and stunned the traditional audience. She rose to fame for her then daring act, and for her twin-plait hairstyle in the song, but also got criticized heavily. The song was sung by Shirodkar herself and became a hit. It was also reused in the play by the same name, and years later in other films as well. She continued to do several other films with Master Vinayak such as Brandichi Batli (1939), Ghar Ki Rani (1940), Amrut (1941) and Majhe Bal (1943).

After retiring from major roles in 1950, Shirodkar played a few minor roles in films and joined Marathi theatre with "Nutan Sangeet Natak Mandali". During the period 1950-75, she worked in twelve Sangeet Nataks (musical plays) including Mruchhakatik, Maanaapmaan, Ekach Pyaala and others.

== Films ==
Year	Film Title	Role	Language
1938	Brahmachari	Kishori	Marathi / Hindi
1939	Devata	Pushpa	Marathi
1939	Brandichi Batli / Brandy Ki Botal	Malati	Marathi / Hindi
1940	Lapandav	Meena	Marathi
1940	Ardhangi / Ghar Ki Rani	Savitri	Marathi / Hindi
1941	Amrut / Amrit	Gulab	Marathi / Hindi
1941	Jhoola		Hindi
1942	Jawani		Hindi
1943	Majhe Bal	Shashi	Marathi
1943	Sangam		Marathi
1943	Amanat		Hindi
1943	Chimukala Sansar		Marathi
1944	Ramshastri	Janaki	Marathi / Hindi
1945	Badi Maa	Usha	Hindi
1945	Pannadai		Marathi
1952	Pelli Chesi Choodu / Kalyanam Panni Paar		Telugu / Tamil
1955	Raftar		Hindi
1957	Miss Mary		Hindi
1958	Raj Tilak		Hindi
1966	Gaban		Hindi
1968	Mere Huzoor		Hindi
1970	Moojrim		Hindi
1972	Pakeezah		Hindi

== Theater ==
Play Title	Language
Mruchhakatik	Marathi
Sanshaykallol	Marathi
Maanaapmaan	Marathi
Saubhadra	Marathi
Ekach Pyaala	Marathi
Bhavbandhan	Marathi
Udyacha Sansar	Marathi
