= Attention (disambiguation) =

Attention is the mental process involved in attending to other objects.

Attention may also refer to:

== Psychology ==
- Attention seeking, behavior which is intended to attract attention from others
- Attention span, the amount of time a person can concentrate on a single activity
- Attentional bias, a type of cognitive bias
- Attention management, at the individual or collective level

== Economics ==
- Attention (advertising), the measure of an advertisement's ability to win the audience's attention
- Attention economy, an approach to the management of information that treats human attention as a scarce commodity

== Music ==
- "Attention" (bugle call), for troops about to be called to attention
- Attention (band), an American rock band

=== Albums ===
- Attention (GusGus album), 2002
- Attention (Philmont album), 2009
- Attention!, by Alexander Klaws, 2006
- Attention: Miley Live, by Miley Cyrus, 2022
- AttenCHUN!, by BoneCrusher, 2003

=== Songs ===
- "Attention" (Charlie Puth song), 2017
- "Attention" (Doja Cat song), 2023
- "Attention" (Fat Joe song), 2018
- "Attention" (NewJeans song), 2022
- "Attention" (Omah Lay and Justin Bieber song), 2022
- "Attention" (Ulrikke Brandstorp song), 2020
- "Attention" (Vilija Matačiūnaitė song), 2014
- "Attention", by Bryson Tiller from Bryson Tiller, 2024
- "Attention", by James from Girl at the End of the World, 2016
- "Attention", by Kep1er from Doublast, 2022
- "Attention", by Miley Cyrus from Attention: Miley Live, 2022
- "Attention", by Ringo Starr from Stop and Smell the Roses, 1981
- "Attention", by Tiwa Savage from Celia, 2020
- "Attention", by Todrick Hall from Haus Party, Pt. 1, 2019
- "Attention", by Tokio Hotel from Humanoid, 2009
- "Attention", by The Weeknd from Starboy, 2016
- "Attention!", by Kesha, Slayyyter and Rose Gray from . (...), 2025
- "Attention!", by XXXTentacion from Bad Vibes Forever, 2019

== Other uses ==
- Attention (machine learning), a technique that mimics natural attention in organisms
- Sati (Buddhism), a Buddhist conception of attention
- At attention, the military courtesy of standing erect when ordered to
- Attention (film), a 1946 Bollywood film

== See also ==
- Attentional control or selective attention, a subset of stimuli received by our sensory organs are selected to enter the consciousness
- Attention deficit hyperactivity disorder, a developmental disorder
  - Adult attention deficit hyperactivity disorder, an attention-deficit hyperactivity disorder that persists in adulthood
- Attention Profiling Mark-up Language, an XML-based format for capturing a person's interests and dislikes
- Continuous partial attention, constantly paying attention to different things, but only partially
- Eight Points of Attention, a military doctrine that was issued in 1928 by Mao Zedong
- Inattentional blindness, failing to perceive an unexpected stimulus in plain sight
- Meditation
- Philosophy
- Secure attention key, a key combination entered before a login screen is presented
