= Keemat =

Keemat (lit. 'Prize' or 'Cost') may refer to these Indian Hindi-language films:

- Keemat (1946 film), a Bollywood film
- Keemat (1973 film), a 1973 Bollywood film starring Dharmendra and Rekha
- Keemat – They Are Back, a 1998 Bollywood film
