= Sati Seeta =

- Release date: 1946
- Country: British India
- Language: Hindi

Sati Seeta is a Bollywood film. It was released in 1946.
