= Sher-E-Baghdad =

- Poster
- Release date: 1946
- Country: India
- Language: Hindi

Sher-E-Baghdad (lit. 'The Lion of Baghdad') is a Bollywood film. It was released in 1946.

The film stars Nadia.
