= Swadesh Sewa =

- Release date: 1946
- Country: India
- Language: Hindi

Swadesh Sewa (transl. Service to one's own country) is a Bollywood film. It was released in 1946.
