= Dhake Ki Malmal =

1956 Indian Hindi-language romantic comedy film

- Directed by: J. K. Nanda
- Starring: Madhubala; Kishore Kumar; Om Prakash
- Music by: O. P. Nayyar
- Release date: 29 March 1956

Dhake Ki Malmal (transl. "Muslin of Dhaka") is a 1956 Indian Hindi-language romantic musical comedy directed by J. K. Nanda and produced under the Nanda Films banner. The film stars Madhubala and Kishore Kumar in lead roles, while Jeevan, Om Prakash and Jagdeep are among the supporting cast.

Dhake Ki Malmal was the first film to star Kumar and Madhubala together, who would later act in several popular musical comedies which include classics like Chalti Ka Naam Gaadi (1958) and Half Ticket (1962). The music was composed by O. P. Nayyar. The print of Dhake Ki Malmal was lost by the studio just after few years of its release, making it a lost film.

== Cast ==
- Madhubala as Mono, a member of Shivana clan
- Kishore Kumar as Jeeva, a member of Bhabana clan who falls in love with Mono
- Om Prakash
- Jagdeep
- Jeevan as Mono's father
- Ulhas
- Sajjan as Kalicharan
- Raj Mehra
- Rajen Haksar
- Shyam Kumar

== Production ==
The film's production began with a muhurat shot in late September 1952, as reported in The Times of India.

== Soundtrack ==
The music director was O. P. Nayyar with D. N. Madhok, Jan Nisar Akhtar and Saroj Mohini Nayyar being the three lyricists. The playback singing was given by Kishore Kumar, Asha Bhosle, Manna Dey, Shamshad Begum and C. H. Atma.

| Song | Singer |
|---|---|
| "Behta Paani Behta Jaaye" | Kishore Kumar, Asha Bhosle, Manna Dey |
| "Ab To Tum Sang" | Asha Bhosle |
| "Jadugar Sanwariya" | Asha Bhosle |
| "More Man Mein Uthe Hai" | Asha Bhosle |
| "Preetam Jab Aan Milenge" | Asha Bhosle |
| "Kuch Kuch Hone Laga, Mera Dil Khone Laga" | Asha Bhosle, Shamshad Begum |
| "Kadar Mori Jane Na, Hay Piya Mane Na" | Asha Bhosle, Shamshad Begum |
| "Diya To Jala Sab Raat Re" | C. H. Atma |

== Reception ==
=== Critical reception ===
Dhake Ki Malmal received a strongly negative review by Baburao Patel of Filmindia, who panned it as a "trite affair" ruined by poor direction from J. K. Nanda. While acknowledging the film's promising historical premise regarding Dacca's muslin weavers, Patel noted that the film is eventually reduced to a slow and "uninspiring" melodrama and fails to entertain.

On the other hand, a Cineplot review praised Dhake Ki Malmal extensively. It wrote that director J.K. Nanda brought the film on the screen with "vivid authenticity and poignant human appeal." It also praised Madhubala for delivering "probably the finest performance of her career so far in the picture's most captivating and important role."

=== Box office ===
Revenue wise, it was the sixteenth highest-grossing film of 1956 and a moderate commercial success.
