= Tum Aur Main =

- Starring: Kanan Devi; Sandhyarani
- Release date: 1946
- Country: India
- Language: Hindi

Tum Aur Main is a Bollywood film. It was released in 1946.
