= Khooni =

- Directed by: K. L. Kahan
- Starring: Raj Rani, Navin Chandra, Hari Mohan, Baburao Pahalwan
- Release date: 1946
- Country: British India
- Language: Hindi

Khooni is a Hindi horror film of Bollywood directed by K. L. Kahan. It was released in 1946 under the banner of Lucky Films.

== Cast ==
- Raj Rani
- Navin Chandra
- Hari Mohan
- Baburao Pahalwan
