= Wamaq Azra =

- Directed by: Nazir Ahmed Khan (Nazir)
- Starring: Swaran Lata; Nazir Ahmed Khan; M. Esmail; Prakash
- Music by: Alla Rakha also known as Allah Rakha Qureshi Film song lyrics by: Tanvir Naqvi
- Release date: 1946
- Country: India
- Language: Hindi

Wamaq Azra is a 1946 Bollywood film.

== Cast ==
- Swaran Lata
- Nazir Ahmed Khan
- M. Esmail
- Prakash
- Kusum Deshpande
