= Gwalan =

- Release date: 1946
- Country: India
- Language: Hindi

Gwalan (lit. 'Village belle') is a Bollywood film. It was released in 1946. It was directed by Baburao Patel and starred Trilok Kapoor, Madhur and Sushila Rani.
