= J. K. Nanda =

Indian director and screenwriter (1904–1983)

Jai Kishan Nanda
- Nanda's portrait c. 1941
- Born: 1904
- Died: 1983 (aged 78–79)
- Occupations: Film director; screenwriter; actor
- Years active: 1930s–1960s

Jai Kishan Nanda (1904–1983) was an Indian film director, screenwriter and actor. Belonging to Chakwal district of the pre-Partition Punjab, he was one of the prominent Punjabi directors of early Indian cinema. His rise as a director coincided with the growing demand for more sophisticated talkies in the early 1930s. The Bombay Chronicle in 1933 called him one of the Indian directors influenced by Western style of filmmaking, alongside Ezra Mir and Mohan Bhavnani.

After acting in films such as Vasantsena (1930), Nanda directed several features including Kurmai (1941), Ishaara (1943), Parwana (1947), Singaar (1949), and Dhake Ki Malmal (1956). He gave Suraiya her first leading role in Ishaara and later directed her opposite K. L. Saigal in Parwana, the actor-singer's final film released after his death. Nanda also wrote the screenplays for two Sohrab Modi films: Jailor (1938) and the National Film Award-winning Mirza Ghalib (1954).

== Career ==
Nanda acted in three films during the late 1920s. He was one of the leading actors of Mohan Bhavnani's drama Vasantsena (1930), based on the Sanskrit play Mṛcchakatika.

Nanda's early work as a director included Pavitra Ganga (1932), Inteqam (1933), and Bahen Ka Prem (1935). A 1936 article in The Bombay Chronicle described his films as "very successful" and noted that he had trained at Germany's UFA Studios after a decade in filmmaking.

Nanda wrote the screenplay of Sohrab Modi's Jailor (1938). In 1941, he directed the Punjabi comedy Kurmai, produced by A. R. Kardar and starring Wasti and Radha Rani. Filmindia's editor Baburao Patel praised the film as the finest Punjabi film produced to date, and wrote that the film established Nanda among India's "front rank" of directors; according to Patel, a distinguishing feature of Nanda's direction was that "all along as the drama unfolds itself, the direction is not felt at all."

Nanda introduced actress Suraiya in his 1943 film Ishaara, which was one of the biggest earners of the year. He then cast Suraiya alongside K. L. Saigal in the musical Parwana; Nanda was apprehensive of completing the film due to Saigal's declining health, but was reasssured by the actor-singer. Parwana was eventually released after Saigal's death in 1947.

In 1949, Nanda directed Singaar, a marital drama centered on birth control, featuring Suraiya, Jairaj and Madhubala. Reviewing the film, critic S. A. Aziz described Nanda's treatment of East Lynne's story as an "absurd hotch-potch", arguing that its altered ending undermined the original drama's integrity. The film was nevertheless reported to be popular with audiences.

During the 1950s, Nanda wrote the screenplay for the musical hit Mirza Ghalib (1954), which won the National Film Award for Best Feature Film. He then directed the romantic comedy Dhake Ki Malmal (1956), based on the production of muslin in Dhaka. It starred Madhubala and Kishore Kumar as members of rival clans who fall in love with each other. In the mid-1960s, Nanda was making Chalaak, a film starring Madhubala and Raj Kapoor, but it remained unfinished due to Madhubala's health problems and her eventual death in 1969.

== Personal life ==
According to the memoirs of Kamlesh Puri (son of Madan Puri), Nanda lived in Bombay's Punjabi Gully, also known as the city's "Hollywood Lane", where his home was frequented by actors such as Madhubala and Nargis, as well as filmmakers such as D. N. Madhok and A. R. Kardar.

Nanda had five daughters. In June 1949, his eldest daughter, Snehalata, married Madan Mohan in Bombay at a wedding that Filmindia described as "perhaps the most popular and best attended" in the film industry in the preceding decade.

== Filmography ==
=== As an actor ===
Prior to his directorial career, Nanda acted in three silent films as an actor.

Year	Film	Role	Ref.
1928	Razalati Rajkumari	Also known as Pauper Princess	
1929	Bagdad No Baharvatio	Also known as Bandit of Bagdad	
1930	Vasantsena	Also known as The Toy Cart	

=== As a director ===
All films in Hindi, unless specified:

Year	Title	Notes	Ref.
1932	Pavitra Ganga	Also known as Sacred Ganges	
1933	Inteqam	Also known as Curses of Cupid and Mohabbat Ki Maar	
1935	Bahen Ka Prem	Also known as Benoor Aankhen	
1941	Kurmai	Punjabi film	
1943	Ishaara		
1946	Jhumke		
1947	Parwana		
1949	Singaar		
1952	Chamkee		
1954	Barati		
1956	Dhake Ki Malmal		
1960s	Chalaak	Unfinished; abandoned due to Madhubala's illness	

=== As a screenwriter ===
Year	Title	Notes	Ref.
1938	Jailor	Directed by Sohrab Modi	
1954	Mirza Ghalib	Directed by Sohrab Modi	
