= Rasili =

- Directed by: Kishore Sharma
- Starring: Sushil Kumar, Radharani
- Release date: 1 January 1946
- Country: India
- Language: Hindi

Rasili is an Indian film released in 1946.

== Cast ==
- Sushil Kumar
- Radharani
- Kanhaiya Lal
- Rani Bala
- Anant

== Soundtrack ==
The music of the film was composed by Hanuman Prasad. Hanuman Prasad and Gafil Harnalvi wrote the lyrics.

=== Song list ===
Song	Singer	Lyricist
Aagaz Chala Anjam Chala	Mukesh, Narayan	Hanuman Prasad
Ye Nayan Kyun Sharma Gaye	Mohammed Rafi, Shamshad Begum	Gafil Harnalvi
Dil Mujhko Jalata Hai	Mohammed Rafi, Shamshad Begum	Hanuman Prasad
Neh Laga Mukh Mod Gaya	Sharma, Geeta Dutt	Gafil Harnalvi
Naino Ki Pyali Se	Sharma, Geeta Dutt	Gafil Harnalvi
Kitne Bedard Hai	Shamshad Begum	Gafil Harnalvi
Gaiya O Gaiya Sansar Ki Maiyya	Shamshad Begum	Gafil Harnalvi
Main Kheto Ki Rani	Shamshad Begum	Gafil Harnalvi
Mori Tuti Kamariya Re	Shamshad Begum, Kalyani	Gafil Harnalvi
Sansar Se Asha Toot Gayi	Shamshad Begum	Gafil Harnalvi
