= Maa Baap Ki Laaj =

- Directed by: Nanabhai Bhatt
- Starring: Swaran Lata; Nazir Ahmed Khan; Jayant
- Music by: A.R. Qureshi
- Distributed by: Hind Pictures
- Release date: 1946
- Country: India
- Language: Hindi

Maa Baap Ki Laaj is a Bollywood film. It was released in 1946.

== Cast ==
- Swaran Lata
- Nazir Ahmed Khan
- Jayant
- Kusum Deshpande
