= Ishaara (1943 film) =

1943 film

Ishaara इशारा
- Directed by: J. K. Nanda
- Starring: Prithviraj Kapoor; Swaran Lata; Suraiya; Jagdish Sethi; K. N. Singh
- Music by: Khwaja Khurshid Anwar
- Distributed by: D.R.D. Production
- Release date: 1943
- Country: India
- Language: Hindi

Ishaara (इशारा "gesture") is a 1943 Indian Bollywood film by J. K. Nanda. It was the tenth highest grossing Indian film of 1943.

== Cast ==
- Prithviraj Kapoor
- Suraiya
- Swaran Lata
- Jagdish Sethi
- K. N. Singh

== Film's popular songs ==
| Song title | Sung by | Lyrics by | Music by | Film notes |
|---|---|---|---|---|
| Shabnam Kyun Nir Bahaaye | Gauhar Sultana | D. N. Madhok | Khwaja Khurshid Anwar | Khwaja Khurshid Anwar's music career began to blossom with this song's popularity in 1943. |
| Panghat Pe Muraliyaa Baaje | Suraiya | D. N. Madhok | Khurshid Anwar | |
| Baghon Mein Koyal Boli | Suraiya | D. N. Madhok | Khurshid Anwar | |
