= Singaar =

1949 film by J. K. Nanda

- Directed by: J. K. Nanda
- Written by: J. K. Nanda
- Screenplay by: J. K. Nanda
- Produced by: R. B. Haldia
- Starring: Suraiya; Madhubala; Jairaj
- Cinematography: Rajnikant Pandya
- Music by: Khurshid Anwar
- Production company: Shree Sound Studio
- Release date: 16 December 1949
- Country: India
- Language: Hindi

Singaar (lit. 'Embellishment') is a 1949 Indian Hindi-language romantic film directed by J. K. Nanda. Produced by R. B. Haldia under his production company, the film stars Suraiya, Madhubala and Jairaj, with Durga Khote and K. N. Singh appearing in supporting roles. The music of the film was composed by Khurshid Anwar.

Also written by Nanda, Singaar featured Suraiya and Jairaj as a couple whose marriage begins troubling after he falls in love with a prostitute named Sitara, played by Madhubala. Principal photography of Singaar took place in Shree Sound studio in Bombay, and was marked by professional rivalry between Suraiya and Madhubala. After many delays, the film was theatrically released on 16 December 1949, and became a critical and commercial success. Madhubala's work specially gained widespread praise. The following year Anwar won an award for composing the music of the film.

== Plot ==
The film tells the story of a doctor who carries an extramarital affair with a dancing girl.

== Cast ==
The cast of Singaar included:

- Suraiya as Shanta
- Madhubala as Sitara
- Jairaj as Dr. Kishan
- Amir Banu as Sitara's mother
- Durga Khote as Kishan's mother
- Madan Puri as Dr. Niranjan
- K. N. Singh as Kishan's father
- Shivraj as Ramu
- Randhir as Ramesh
- Cuckoo as Dancer
- Prem Dhawan as Dancer

== Production ==
The principal photography of Singaar took place in Shree Sound studios between February and May 1949. The film's was a troubled production, marked by professional rivalry between Madhubala and Suraiya. Reportedly, the latter was unhappy with Madhubala's rising fame and felt that the diligent actress did not deserve the attention director Nanda was paying to her. Mohan Deep, Madhubala's biographer, has stated the following in his book The Mystery And Mystique of Madhubala (1996):

Unit hands wouldn't notice the cold vibes since Suraiya and Madhubala, the actresses that they were, never gave a hint of their true feelings. But they would play games and friendly journalists would come in handy. [...] It was the producer who would have ulcers. If Madhubala had five close-ups, Suraiya wanted seven and if Suraiya was given an expensive silk sari to wear, Madhubala wanted some thing more expensive. Hero Jairaj would look silently amused.

== Soundtrack ==
The soundtrack was composed by Khursheed Anwar, and lyrics were penned by Deenanath Madhok, Nakshab and Shakeel Badayuni.

No.	Title	Singer(s)	Length
1.	"Woh Din Kidhar Gaye Kaho"	Suraiya
2.	"Ae Bhoolne Wale"	Suraiya
3.	"O Bedardi Yun Hamko Na Sata"	Surinder Kaur
4.	"Aayi Aayi Suhag Ki Raat"	Shamshad Begum
5.	"Ae Dard-E-Mohabbat"	Suraiya, Surinder Kaur
6.	"Naya Nainon Mein Rang Nayi Uthi Umang"	Suraiya
7.	"Dhadhak Dhadhak Tere Bin Mora Jiyara"	Suraiya
8.	"Ari O Mohe Chhed Gaya"	Rajkumari Dubey
9.	"Kaun Samjega Dil Aane Ke Dhang, lyricist by Nakhshab Jarchavi"	Surinder Kaur
10.	"Chanda Re Main Teri Gawaahi Lene Aayi"	Surinder Kaur

== Release ==
Singaar, despite being completed in May, was distributed in July.

It was released at Liberty Cinema, Bombay, on 16 December 1949.

== Reception ==
The film was a box office success and became the seventeenth highest-grossing film of the year. According to an advertisement in Amrita Bazar Patrika, the film ran for over 13 weeks in theatres.

=== Critical reception ===
It received excellent reviews from critics, but while its production values and soundtrack were lauded, some criticism was directed towards the slow-paced direction. The Motion Picture Magazine nevertheless called it one of the best films made in 1949, describing it as a "fabulous picture well acted". The Times of India's review read: "Director Nanda Crashes Into The Singaar China Shop".

Madhubala's portrayal of a prostitute was critically praised, and critics rated her superior to the leading actress Suraiya. Film critic Baburao Patel stated: "Madhubala beats Suraiya hollow in every sequence they meet. She stores more emotions in a single face than would a thousand girls with as many faces." Singaar is said to be a watershed film, which started the downfall of Suraiya, the leading star of the time, and simultaneous rise of Madhubala, who later became the top actress in the 1950s and early 1960s.

== Awards ==
Music director Anwar won the "Clare Award for Best Music Director." He was praised for giving "folk touch to several numbers."
