= Chehra (1946 film) =

- Directed by: Rajendra Sharma
- Written by: S. K Ojma
- Produced by: H.K Malhotra
- Starring: Surrya Zulfi; Najma; Kaneez
- Cinematography: Mozelle Zamir
- Music by: M.A Mukhtar
- Release date: 1946
- Country: India
- Language: Hindi

Chehra is a Bollywood film. It was released in 1946.
