= Swaran Lata (actress) =

Pakistani actress (1924 - 2008)

- سوَرن لتا
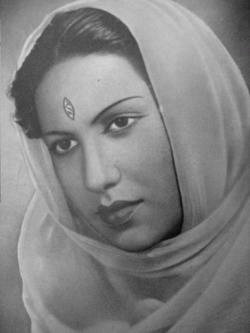
- Swaran Lata
- Born: 20 December 1924; Rawalpindi, Punjab, British India
- Died: 8 February 2008 (aged 83); Lahore, Punjab, Pakistan
- Other names: The Tragedy Queen; Saeeda Bano
- Occupation: Actress
- Years active: 1942 – 1971
- Spouse(s): Pessi Billimoria (div. 1945) Nazir Ahmed Khan (m. 1945–1983)
- Children: 4

Swaran Lata (Urdu: سوَرن لتا, Hindi: स्वर्न लता, 20 December 1924 – 8 February 2008) was a Pakistani film actress. She started her career in the film industry in British India and later moved to Pakistan. She was known as The Tragedy Queen for her portrayal in emotional, tragic roles, and moving dialogue delivery. She worked both in Bollywood and in Pakistani cinema.

== Early life ==
Swaran Lata was born into a Sikh family in Rawalpindi, British India, now in Pakistan on 20 December 1924. She did her Senior Cambridge diploma from Delhi and then joined the Academy of Music and Arts, Lucknow. In the early 1940s, her family moved to Bombay. She acted in a total of 22 movies in British India from 1942 to 1948.

Swaran Lata later converted to Islam after she married Nazir Ahmed, a famous actor, director and producer at the time. She changed her name to Saeeda Bano. The Swaran-Nazir pair was a very creative couple, churning out many movies together both before and after the Partition of India in 1947.

== Film career ==
Swaran's parents died when she was very young and she lived most of her adolescent life with her elder brother, whom she recalls being "very strict" on her. However, it is the story of how she got discovered that Swaran tells with great passion:

"I was a student at a college in Lucknow, India. When I was traveling from Delhi to Lucknow, a few film directors happened to see me. They approached me to act in films but I was not interested at first. One of them then went to my elder brother with the offer, and to my utmost surprise he agreed".

Swaran Lata started her career as a stage actress. Her first film was Awaaz released in 1942. Her position as a lead actress was secured when she played the lead in the box office hit Rattan (1944). She fell for Nazir, her co-star in Preet and Laila Majnu (both 1945) and married him. At the time of the Partition of India in 1947 Swaran and Nazir, left everything they had behind in Bombay and migrated to Pakistan, settling in Lahore, Punjab. The duo had to start from scratch and were considered among the pioneers of the early Pakistani film industry.

Swaran Lata was the lead actress of Pakistan's first ever silver jubilee film Pheray (1949). This film was a Punjabi film but she was comfortable as an Urdu language speaker who was educated in Lucknow, the home of Urdu littérateurs. For the film, she was coached in Punjabi language by Baba Alam Siahposh, a Punjabi poet, who was also one of the lyricists of the film songs.

As a lead actress, Laarey (1950), Naukar (1955), Heer (1955) were her famous films, and as a supporting actress, Sawaal (1966) was her famous film. From 1960 onwards, she cut back her film appearances and mainly shifted towards supporting roles until she gracefully retired in 1971.

In her lifetime, Swaran worked with great names like Prithviraj Kapoor and Motilal in India and with Santosh Kumar, Darpan, Inayat Hussain Bhatti and Habib in Pakistan.

== Personal life ==
Lata was initially married to Pessi Billimoria, whom she reportedly divorced in late 1945. The same year, she married actor Nazir Ahmed Khan. The couple had four children including three daughters and one son. Famous Pakistani actor Nauman Ijaz is her grandson.

== Death ==
Swaran Lata died at the age of 83 in Lahore, Pakistan on 8 February 2008.

== Filmography ==
=== Television shows ===
Year	Title	Role	Network
1983	Silver Jubilee	Herself	PTV
1987	Aaap Ka Zamir	Herself	PTV

=== Film ===
Year	Film	Language
1942	Awaaz	Hindi
1943	Inkaar	Hindi
1943	Tasveer	Hindi
1943	Pratiggya	Hindi
1943	Heer Ranjha	Punjabi
1943	Ishaara	Hindi
1944	Uss Paar	Hindi
1944	Swarna Bhoomi	Hindi
1944	Raunaq	Hindi
1944	Rattan	Hindi
1944	Ghar Ki Shobha	Hindi
1944	Badi Baat	Hindi
1944	Maharathi Karna	Hindi
1945	Preet	Hindi
1945	Laila Majnu	Hindi
1945	Pratima	Hindi
1945	Chand Tara	Hindi
1946	Wamaq Azra	Hindi
1946	Insaf	Hindi
1946	Maa Baap Ki Laaj	Hindi
1946	Sham Savera	Hindi
1947	Abida	Hindi
1948	Gharbar	Hindi
1949	Sachai	Urdu
1949	Pheray	Punjabi
1950	Anokhi Daastan	Urdu
1950	Laaray	Punjabi
1952	Bheegi Palken	Urdu
1953	Shehri Babu	Punjabi
1955	Khatoon	Urdu
1955	Naukar	Urdu
1955	Heer	Punjabi
1956	Sabira	Urdu
1956	Soteeli Maa	Urdu
1957	Noor-e-Islam	Urdu
1959	Shama	Urdu
1962	Billo Jee	Punjabi
1965	Azmat-e-Islam	Urdu
1966	Sawaal	Urdu
1969	Qasm Us Waqt Ki	Urdu
1971	Duniya Na Maney	Urdu

=== Other appearance ===
Year	Title	Role	Network
1997	Tum Jo Chaho Tu Suno	Herself	PTV

== See also ==
- List of Lollywood actors
