= Jeevan Yatra =

- Directed by: Master Vinayak
- Produced by: V Shantaram
- Starring: Nayantara; Prathima Devi
- Release date: 1946
- Country: India
- Language: Hindi

Jeevan Yatra is a Bollywood film. It was released in 1946.
