= Kismat Ka Dhani =

- Release date: 1946
- Country: India
- Language: Hindi

Kismat Ka Dhani is a Bollywood film. It was released in 1946.
