= Bhedi Khazana =

1946 film

- Release date: 1946
- Country: India
- Language: Hindi

Bhedi Khazana (lit. 'Piercing treasure') is a Bollywood film. It was released in 1946.
