= Jhumke =

- Directed by: J. K. Nanda
- Written by: Saadat Hassan Manto
- Starring: Gajanan Jagirdar; Lalita Pawar
- Release date: 1946
- Country: India
- Language: Hindi

Jhumke is a Bollywood film. It was released in 1946.
