= Zameen Aasmaan (1946 film) =

- Directed by: Dwarka Khosla
- Music by: Kamal Dasgupta
- Release date: 1946
- Country: India
- Language: Hindi

Zameen Aasmaan is a Bollywood film. It was released in 1946.
