= Raunaq =

Raunaq रौनक
- Directed by: Dwarka Khosla
- Starring: Chandraprabha; Swaran Lata; Noor Mohammed Charlie; Chandra Mohan
- Music by: C. Ramchandra
- Release date: 1944
- Country: India
- Language: Hindi

Raunaq is a 1944 Bollywood film directed by Dwarka Khosla and starring Chandraprabha, Swaran Lata, Noor Mohammed Charlie (billed as Charlie), Chandra Mohan, Motilal and Subarnalata Subarnalata. It was released in 1944.

== Cast ==
- Swaran Lata
- Noor Mohammed Charlie
- Chandra Mohan
- Motilal
- Subarnalata Subarnalata

== Music ==
1. "Duniya Kisi Ko Haye Majbur Na Kare" – Hamida Banu
2. "Ghunghat Me Haule Haule Bole Dulhan" – N/A
3. "Hum Dil Ko Lutaate Hai" – Hamida Banu
4. "Teri Na Me Kuch Nihan Hai" – N/A
5. "Aye Dard Itna Badh Jaa" – N/A
6. "Ek Kahar Barpa Karta Hai" – Charlie
7. "O Saawariya Na Tarsa" – N/A
8. "Wah Sapne Jo Mann Bhaye" – Srimati Ghosh
9. "Ye Kaisi Ladaai" – N/A
10. "Zara Bansi Baja" – Srimati Ghosh
