= Shama (1946 film) =

1946 film

- Directed by: Sibtain Fazli
- Screenplay by: K.B. Hakeem Ahmed Shuja
- Story by: K.B. Hakeem Ahmed Shuja
- Produced by: Sohrab Modi
- Starring: Mehtab; Chanda Bai; Sadat Ali; Wasti; Ameem Banu; Abu Baqar; Anwari; Prakash
- Cinematography: S.D. Patel
- Edited by: D.D. Shirdhankar
- Music by: Ghulam Haider
- Production company: Minerva Movietone
- Release date: 1946 (British India)
- Country: India
- Language: Hindi/Urdu

Shama is a 1946 (pre-partition) Bollywood film, directed by Sibtain Fazli, starring Mehtab, Chanda Bai, Sadat Ali, Wasti and Amir Bano in lead roles.

== Music ==
Ghulam Haider composed the music for the film and for playback singers, Shamshad Begum, Hamida Banu, Zohrabai Ambalewali and G. M. Durrani. Shams Lucknavi, Ehsan Rizvi and Shewan Rizvi wrote the lyrics.
