= Mera Geet =

- Release date: 1946
- Country: India
- Language: Hindi

Mera Geet is a Bollywood film. It was released in 1946.
