= Haqdar =

1946 film

- Directed by: Rafiq Rizvi
- Music by: Mohammed Shafi
- Release date: 1946
- Country: India
- Language: Hindi

Haqdar is a Bollywood film. It was released in 1946.
