= Sham Savera =

- Directed by: M. Sadiq
- Written by: M. Sadiq
- Starring: Swaran Lata; Rafiq Ghaznavi; Sulochana Chatterjee; Prathima Devi
- Music by: Amar Nath
- Distributed by: J.M.R. Pictures; Saregama
- Release date: 1946
- Country: India
- Language: Hindi

Sham Savera is a Bollywood film. It was released in 1946.

== Cast ==
- Swaran Lata
- Rafiq Ghaznavi
- Sulochana Chatterjee
- Prathima Devi
