= Hamida Banu (singer) =

Pakistani singer

- Born: Hamida Banu Begum; 19 October 1928; Lahore, Punjab Province, British India
- Died: 9 November 2006 (aged 78); Lahore, Punjab, Pakistan
- Occupations: Actress; Singer; Producer
- Years active: 1935 – 1971
- Children: 1

Hamida Banu was an Indian classical singer and playback singer as well a ghazal singer in Cinema of India in 1930s till 1960s.

== Early life ==
Hamida was born on 19 October in 1928 at Lahore during British India. Hamida and her younger sister loved singing and then a person advised her that she should move to Bombay and try singing in films.

Hamida and her family then moved to Bombay but she couldn't find work so then her family went to Calcutta there she started to act and sing in stage dramas and theatre plays at Prithvi Theatre. She was spotted by Prithviraj Kapoor, he liked her singing and he had her sing in his plays. She met Raj Kapoor in a stage play and he told her that she had a good voice and should act in films then she acted in few films.

She and Shashi Kapoor worked together in stage plays and dramas which were written by Agha Hashar Kashmiri.

== Career ==
Hamida also sang ghazals and geets at stage plays and later she started singing ghazals in films. Then she started singing at All India Radio.

Later actor Bhagwan Dada recommended her to director C. Ramchandra later she sang Kaun Gali Ka Chhora Pukare in film Sanjog the song was composed by Naushad.

Then she worked in films Raunaq (1944), Nagma-E-Sahara (1945), Amar Raj (1946), Duniya Ek Sarai (1946) Zevaraat (1949), Chor (1951), Rajput (1951).

In 1945 she and Suraiya sanged a deut song in film Main Kya Karoon. In 1948 she did playback singing in film Parai Aag in which she sanged Kuch Bhi Na Kaha the song was composed by Ghulam Mohammed. In 1951 she worked with Geeta Dutt by singing a duet song in Rajput later she did playback singing in film Bikhare Moti by singing Dono Hain Majboor Pyare the song was composed by Ghulam Mohammed.

In 1956 she moved to Pakistan and there she worked at Radio Lahore Pakistan later she started singing songs on musical programs that aired on PTV.

In 1967 she worked as a producer in film Pyar Ki Baazi and then in 1971 she worked as producer in film Gehra Raaz.

In late 1971 she retired and went to live with her son at Lahore.

== Personal life ==
Hamida was married and she had one son.

== Death ==
She died on 9 November 2006, at Lahore, Pakistan.

== Filmography ==
=== Television shows ===
Year	Title	Role	Network
1999	Focus Punjab	Herself	PTV

=== Film ===
Year	Film	Language
1935	Bharat Ki Beti	Hindi
1935	Bhool Ka Bhog	Hindi
1937	Sarojini	Hindi
1943	Sanjog	Hindi
1944	Jeevan	Hindi
1944	Raunaq	Hindi
1944	Badi Baat	Hindi
1944	Anban	Hindi
1944	Bade Nawab Saheb	Hindi
1944	Lalkar	Hindi
1944	Manorama	Hindi
1944	Mauji Jeevan	Hindi
1944	Mera Khwab	Hindi
1944	Parakh	Hindi
1944	Shahenshah Babar	Hindi
1945	Sawan	Hindi
1945	Naseeb	Hindi
1945	Moorat	Hindi
1945	Naghma-E-Sahara	Hindi
1945	Preet	Hindi
1945	Sharbati Aankhen	Hindi
1945	Main Kya Karun	Hindi / Urdu
1946	Amar Raj	Hindi
1946	Bhakhta Prahlad	Hindi
1946	Dharti	Hindi
1946	Shama	Hindi
1946	Devar	Hindi
1946	Nek Pervin	Hindi
1946	Durban	Hindi
1946	Insaaf	Hindi
1946	Phoolwari	Hindi
1946	Magadhraj	Hindi
1946	Duniya Ek Sarai	Hindi
1946	Pujari	Hindi
1946	Rajputani	Hindi
1947	Khaufnak Aankhen	Hindi
1947	Neel Kamal	Hindi
1947	Chheen Le Azadi	Hindi
1947	Lakhon Mein Ek	Hindi
1947	But Tarash	Urdu
1947	Pahali Pehchan	Hindi
1947	Pati Seva	Hindi
1947	Pul	Hindi
1947	Tohfa	Hindi
1948	Grihasthi	Hindi
1948	Kajal	Hindi
1948	Parai Aag	Hindi
1948	Kamyabi	Hindi
1948	Khel	Hindi
1948	Majboor	Hindi
1948	Yeh Hai Duniya	Hindi
1949	Dhoom Dham	Hindi
1949	Rimjhim	Hindi
1949	Janmapatri	Hindi
1949	Zevaraat	Hindi
1949	Shohrat	Hindi
1949	Tara	Hindi
1950	Chor	Hindi
1950	Hanste Aansoo	Hindi
1950	Maang	Hindi
1951	Rajput	Hindi
1951	Bikhare Moti	Hindi
1952	Anjaam	Hindi
1954	Majboori	Hindi
1955	Shree 420	Hindi
1959	Zara Bachke	Hindi
1965	Black Arrow	Hindi
1967	Pyar Ki Baazi	Hindi
1971	Gehra Raaz	Hindi
