= Dil (1946 film) =

- Starring: Junaid Zamindar
- Release date: 1946
- Country: India
- Language: Hindi

Dil is a Bollywood film. It was released in 1946.
