= Ghar Ki Rani =

- Directed by: Master Vinayak
- Release date: 1940
- Country: India
- Language: Hindi

Ghar Ki Rani is a 1940 Bollywood film directed by and starring Master Vinayak.

== Cast ==
- Master Vinayak as Satyavan
- Meenakshi Shirodkar as Savitri
- Baburao Pendharkar
- Damuanna Malvankar
- Leela Chitnis as Arundhati
