= Duniya Ek Sarai =

- Directed by: Kidar Sharma
- Starring: Meena Kumari
- Release date: 1 January 1946
- Country: India
- Language: Hindi

Duniya Ek Sarai (lit. 'World a Serai') is a 1946 Indian Hindi-language film directed by Kidar Sharma. It stars Jagirdar, Begum Para, and Altaf with Meena Kumari in a supporting role. Kumari after her career as a child artist, started doing adult roles as heroines in mythological and fantasy genres before she finally made it in mainstream cinema with Baiju Bawra (1952).

== Music ==
1. "Ek Musaafir Aaye Bawa" – Mohammed Farooqui
2. "Dekh Hame Muskaye Kyo Balamwa Sajanwa" – Hamida Banu, Mukesh
3. "Ghat Par Ek Matka Ek Matki" – Shamshad Begum
4. "Aayi Baisakhi Bagiya Mehki" – Mohammed Farooqui
5. "Chanda Ki Chandni Na Suhaye To Kya Kare" – Shamshad Begum
6. "Cheen Li Hamari Hansi De Gaye Rona Humko" – Zohrabai Ambalewali, Meena Kumari
7. "Joban Pe Kyon Itraai Kali" -
8. "Ma Dekh Ri Ma Badli" – Meena Kumari
9. "Sawan Beet Gayo Mayi Ri" – Meena Kumari
