= Badi Maa =

- Directed by: Master Vinayak
- Written by: V. S. Khendekar; Zia Sarhadi Screenplay
- Produced by: Prafulla Pictures, Kanpur
- Starring: Noor Jehan; Ishwarlal; Sitara Devi; Yakub
- Cinematography: Madhav Bulbule
- Music by: K. Dutta
- Production company: Prafulla Pictures
- Distributed by: Manzoor Productions
- Release date: 1945
- Running time: 122 minutes
- Country: India
- Language: Hindi

Badi Maa (Hindi pronunciation: ['bə.ɽiː 'mɑ̃ː]; transl. Elder Mother), also called Bari-Ma, is a 1945 Indian Hindi-language war drama film. It was produced and directed by Master Vinayak. Made under the banner of Prafulla Pictures, Kolhapur, it had story written by V. S. Khendekar. Zia Sarhadi wrote the screenplay and lyrics for six songs. The other lyricists were Anjum Pilibhiti and Raja Badhe. The music director was K. Datta (Datta Koregaonkar).

The film starred Noor Jehan, Ishwarlal, Yakub, Sitara Devi, Meenaxi, Baby Alka, Damuanna Malvankar, Leela Mishra and Girish. It had playback singer Lata Mangeshkar in one of her rare early acting roles, performing alongside Noor Jehan. Besides Mangeshkar, the film also had singer Asha Bhosle in a minor role with the other two singers.

Made at the end of WWII, the film factors the Japanese involvement, with Yakub and Sitara Devi acting as spies for Japan. The lead pair, Ishwarlal and Noor Jehan take them on, emerging victorious.

== Plot ==
Set against the backdrop of WW II, Dinesh is stuck in London during the Blitz. Dinesh's father Durgadas lives in the village of Dinapur in India, with his daughter Usha. Durgadas owes money to Ghanshyam, a money-lender with two children. Ghanshyam's son Rajinder, is a spy for the Japanese and is helped by a dancer called Mona. His daughter Hema is a compassionate, patriotic girl unaware of her brother's plans and is in love with Dinesh.

Ghanshyam offers to free Durgadas of his debt if he will agree to his daughter's marriage to Rajinder. When Durgadas refuses, Ghanshyam has his property confiscated. Dinesh returns to India and is shocked to find his father in penury and an attack on his village by the Japanese. He takes up arms to fight and is joined by Hema. His sister Usha dies under enemy firing, and a repentant Rajinder fights the enemy dying in the bargain. Hema and Dinesh survive the war having fought for Badi Maa (India), and get together.

== Cast ==
- Noor Jehan as Hema
- Ishwarlal as Dinesh
- Yakub as Rajinder
- Sitara as Mona, Rajinder's partner in spying
- Meenaxi as Usha, Dinesh's sister
- D. S. Salvi as Durgadas, Dinesh's father
- Girish as Ghanshyam, Hema and Rajinder's father
- Lata Mangeshkar
- Asha Bhosle in a minor role
- Baby Alka

== Review ==
Filmindia, with its newly formed rating system of one to five stars with one being Rotten, Avoid and five being Excellent, Don't miss, gave the film a one star rating. In its September 1945 issue, it panned the film terming it a "propaganda social" and claiming the film to be "the year's most rotten show".

Though the film came in for criticism for being a propaganda film, made "under the constant goading of the Information Department", it was a commercial success at the box-office, becoming the third highest grossing Indian film of that year.

== Soundtrack ==
The music was composed by K. Datta with the songs written by three lyricists. Zia Sarhadi wrote the lyrics for six of the ten songs in the film, Anjum Pilibhiti three songs, and Raja Badhe one song. The singers were Noor Jehan, Baby Alka, Lata Mangeshkar and Ishwarlal.

=== Song list ===
#	Title	Singer	Lyricist
1	"Aa Intezar Hai Tera Dil Beqarar Hai Mera"	Noor Jehan	Zia Sarhadi
2	"Aana Kya Hai Ek Bahaana Jaane Ka"	Meenaxi	Zia Sarhadi
3	"Chhananan Chhum Chhananan"	Baby Alka	Raja Badhe
4	"Diya Jalakar Aap Bhujaaya"	Noor Jehan	Zia Sarhadi
5	"Khil Jao Bagh Ki Kaliyon"	Baby Alka	Zia Sarhadi
6	"Kisi Tarah Se Mohabbat Mein Chain Paa Na Sakey"	Noor Jehan	Anjum Pilibhiti
7	"Mata Tere Charnon Mein"	Lata Mangeshkar, Ishwarlal	Zia Sarhadi
8	"Pyara Pyara Mausam Hai Rut Suhani"	Baby Alka	Anjum Pilibhiti
9	"Tum Humko Bhulaa Baithe Ho"	Noor Jehan	Zia Sarhadi
10	"Tum Ho Maa Badi Maa"	Lata Mangeshkar, Meenaxi	Anjum Pilibhiti
