= Maharani Minaldevi =

- Release date: 1946
- Country: India
- Language: Hindi

Maharani Minaldevi is a Bollywood film. It was released in 1946.
