= Keemat (1946 film) =

- Release date: 1946
- Country: India
- Language: Hindi

Keemat is a Bollywood film. It was released in 1946.
