= Maya Machhindra =

Maya Macchindra, alternatively named Alakh Niranjan, is the title of various films produced in different languages in India. The story is based on the life of Matsyendranath or Machindranath, one of the 84 Mahasiddhas, tantric yogic master and the founder of nath lineage, and his famous disciple, Gorakhnath.

== 1932 Marathi/Hindi film ==
Maya Machhindra

Maya Machhindra is a 1932 Marathi and Hindi black-and-white film, produced by Prabhat Films and directed by Shantaram Rajaram Vankudre. The film is based on Mani Shankar Trivedi's play Siddhasansar, with music scored by Govindrao Tembe.

=== Cast ===
- Govindrao Tembe—Machhindranath
- Durga Khote—Queen
- Master Vinayak—Gorakh
- Baburao Pendharkar

=== Production ===
Maya Machhindra was a popular legend in ancient India and Tibet about tantric masters, and was made into a movie six times. It was first made in Marathi and Hindi in 1932, soon after India's first sound film Alam Ara was made in 1931. The film was produced and directed by Vankudre (for V.) Shantaram. Govinda Rao Tembe played Machindranath. His disciple Gorakhnath was played by Vinayak, and the queen was played by Durga Khote.

== 1939 Tamil film ==
Maya Machindra
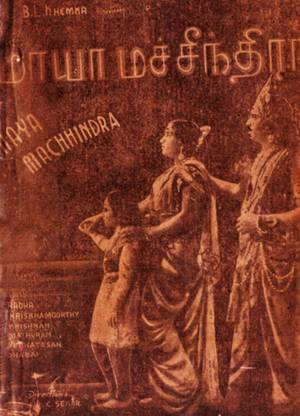
- Directed by: Raja Chandrasekhar
- Starring: M. K. Radha; M. B. Radha Bai; M. G. Ramachandran; N. S. Krishnan; T. A. Madhuram; M. G. Chakrapani
- Music by: Papanasam Sivan
- Production company: Metropolitan Pictures
- Release date: 22 April 1939
- Country: India
- Language: Tamil

Maya Machindra is a Tamil-language film, scripted by Lakshmana Das. The title role was essayed by M.K. Radha. The film was released in 1939 and had a successful run.

According to MGR's autobiography 'Naan Yaen Piranthaen', M.G. Nadaraja Pillai was originally selected to play the villain (Sooriya Kethu) in the movie, and MGR was given the minor role of Visaladcha Maharaja, a brother of Sooriya Kethu. This minor character would be killed in the first and only scene he appears in. But M.G. Nadaraja Pillai passed away one week before the shooting was scheduled to begin in Calcutta. As a result, MGR was given the Sooriya Kethu role, assigned to the deceased actor. MGR had praised M.G. Nadaraja Pillai, as the one who gave him 'good career enhancing break' by his death. Saradha Venkatachalam is the main role child artist whose only film was this. She is an adept in Carnatic music. She is the daughter of Shri Ramachandra Iyer a philanthropist. After this film she did not continue acting. She married Sh P K Venkatachalam Iyer. She died in 2019.

=== Cast ===
Actor	Role
M. K. Radha	Machindran
M. R. Krishnamurthi	Gorakhnath
M. G. Ramachandar	Sooryakethu
M. B. Radha Bai	Oormila Devi
Saradha Venkatachalam	Mouninath
T. V. Janakam	
N. S. Krishnan	
T. A. Mathuram	
M. G. Chakrapani	
P. G. Venkatesan	
K. S. Sankara Iyer	
T. M. Pattammal	
Saroja Ratnavali	
Ramalakshmi	
L. Chandrika	
K. Soundaram	
Sundari	
K.S. Velayudham	
V. Nataraj	

=== 1945 Telugu film ===
Maya Machhindra
- Directed by: P. Pullaiah
- Starring: Jandhyala Gaurinatha Sastry; Addanki Srirama Murthy; Kannamba; Satyajeet
- Music by: B. Narasimha Rao
- Release date: 1945
- Country: India
- Language: Telugu

Maya Machhindra is a 1945 Telugu language film directed by P. Pullaiah.

=== Cast ===
- Jandhyala Gaurinatha Sastry
- Addanki Srirama Murthy
- Kannamba
- K. Malathi
- Satyajeet
- Krishna Murthy

== 1975 Telugu Film ==
Maya Maschindra
- Directed by: Babubhai Mistry
- Written by: Gabbita Venkata Rao (story / dialogues)
- Screenplay by: Babu Bhai Mistry
- Produced by: Pinjala Subba Rao
- Starring: N. T. Rama Rao; Vanisri
- Cinematography: K. S. Prasad
- Edited by: Kanda Swamy
- Music by: Satyam
- Production company: P. S. R. Pictures
- Release date: 9 July 1975
- Running time: 138 mins
- Country: India
- Language: Telugu

Maya Maschindra is a 1975 Telugu language film produced by Pinjala Subba Rao and directed by Babu Bhai Mistry. It was also dubbed into Hindi.

=== Cast ===
- N. T. Rama Rao as Lord Vishnu / Maya Machhindra
- Vanisri as Goddess Lakshmi / Tilottama Devi
- Ramakrishna as Lord Siva / Ghoraknath
- Kantha Rao
- K. V. Chalam as Vaidyanath
- Kanchana

== Hindi movies ==
It was made into Bollywood film in 1950 as Alakh Niranjan, and Maya Machhindra in 1951, starring Trilok Kapoor and Nirupa Roy, in 1960 starring Manher Desai and Nirupa Roy.

== 1981 Gujarati movie ==
Allakh Niranjan is a 1981 Indian Gujarati film, directed by Jayant.K.Bhatt. The film stars Rita Bhaduri, Jayshree Gadkar, Jayshree T., Ramesh Mehta, Shrikant Jani, and Manhar Desai.
