= Attention (film) =

1946 film

- Directed by: M. Navewala
- Release date: 1946
- Country: India
- Language: Hindi

Attention is a 1946 Bollywood film.
