= Pehchan (1946 film) =

- Directed by: P.C. Barua
- Release date: 1946
- Country: India
- Language: Hindi

Pehchan is a Bollywood film. It was released in 1946.
