= Master Vinayak =

Indian actor and film director

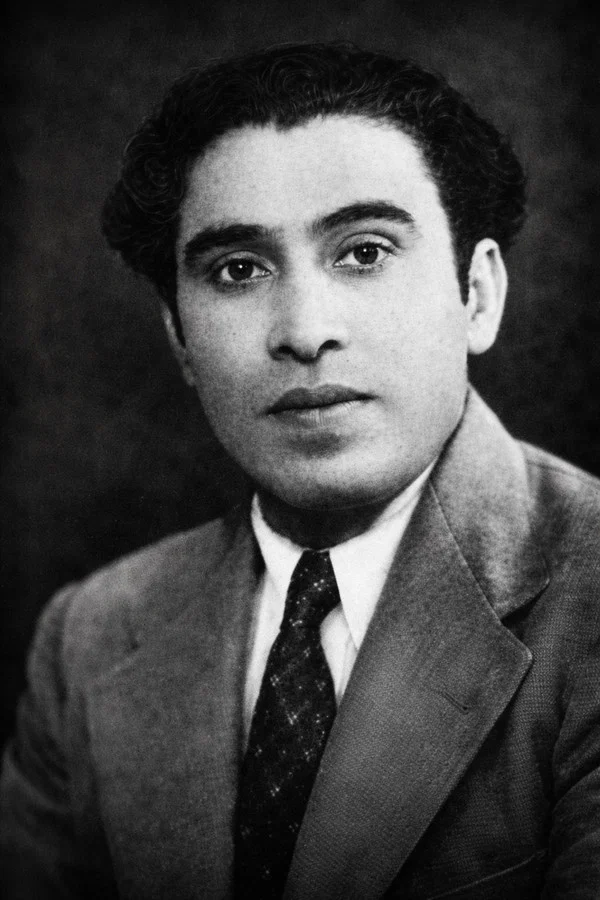
- Born: Vinayak Damodar Karnataki; 19 January 1906; Kolhapur
- Died: 19 August 1947 (aged 41)
- Occupations: Film actor; director
- Spouse: Sushila (m. 1930–1947)
- Children: 2 (including Nanda)
- Family: Karnataki family

Vinayak Damodar Karnataki (19 January 1910 – 19 August 1947), professionally known as Master Vinayak, was an acclaimed Indian actor, director, and producer. Over a cinematic career spanning sixteen years, he directed eighteen films and performed acting roles in the majority of them.

== Early life ==
Vinayak was born on 19 January 1910 in Kolhapur. He completed his formal education in his hometown. Due to the impoverished financial circumstances of his family, he was required to work as a school teacher for a brief period during his early life.

== Career ==
=== Early work and directorial debut ===
Vinayak began his career in the film industry in 1932, when he secured the role of the mythological sage Narada in the Hindi-Marathi bilingual film Ayodhyecha Raja, produced by the Prabhat Film Company and directed by his cousin V.Shantaram. After working across five films for Prabhat, the production company relocated its base to Pune. Following this transition, Vinayak moved to Kolhapur Cinetone, where he was granted his first opportunity to work as a film director.

=== Hans Pictures (1935–1939) ===
In 1935, Vinayak directed Vilasi Ishwar, an adaptation of a story written by Mama Warerkar that centered on the sensitive social issue of illegitimate children. Helming the project was considered a difficult task, but Vinayak successfully completed the direction using his deep understanding of literature and cinema.

During this timeframe, Vinayak co-founded the production house 'Hans Pictures' in partnership with Baburao Pendharkar and Pandurang Naik. He spent four years working with Hans Pictures as both an actor and a director. His most notable directorial works during these four years include Chhaya (1936), Jwala (1938), Brahmachari (1938), and Brandichi Batli (1939). While working under this banner, Vinayak acted on the advice of independence activist Vinayak Damodar Savarkar to translate the English opening credit titles of his films into the Marathi language.

Amongst his work, he is best remembered for the 1938 Marathi film Brahmachari. It was considered controversial by audiences at the time for having the leading lady (played by Meenakshi Shirodkar) in a bathing suit.

=== Navyug Chitrapat and Prafull Pictures (1940–1947) ===
Following the closure of Hans Pictures in 1940, Vinayak joined the Navyug Chitrapat organization. Under this company, he directed the films Lagna Pahave Karun (1940), Amrut (1941), and Sarkari Pahune (1942).

In 1942, Vinayak recognized the artistic potential of Lata Mangeshkar, the daughter of Master Dinanath, and cast her in the film Pahili Mangalagaur (1942), though he was unable to personally complete the production. In 1943, he established his own independent production banner, Prafull Pictures, and continued to feature Mangeshkar in its films. The company's production Maze Baal (1943) became highly popular. While managing his independent banner, Vinayak also accepted an acting role in V. Shantaram's film Dr. Kotnis Ki Amar Kahani (1946).

=== Final works ===
The last film that Vinayak fully completed directing was Rajkamal Kalamandir's Jeevanyatra (1946). He died before Prafull Pictures' upcoming film, Mandir (1948), could be fully prepared for release.

== Personal life ==
Master Vinayak was born in Kolhapur, Maharashtra, India. He married Sushila. The couple had seven children, including late actress Nanda and film producer and director, Jayaprakash Karnataki who is married to actress Jayshree T. His grandson Swastik Karnatki and his great-grand son Karann Gurbaxani are also directors in Mumbai.

Master Vinayak was related to many personalities in the Indian film industry. His brother Vasudev Karnataki became a cinematographer while noted film personalities Baburao Pendharkar (1896–1967) and Bhalji Pendharkar (1897–1994) were his half-brothers. He was also a maternal cousin of legendary film director V. Shantaram. Master Vinayak was a good friend of the Mangeshkar family and introduced Lata Mangeshkar to the film industry with his movie Pahilee Mangalagaur.

== Death ==
Vinayak died in Bombay on 19 August 1947.

== Filmography ==
- Dr. Kotnis Ki Amar Kahani (1946)
- Mazhe Bal (1943)
- Amrit (1941)
- Sangam (1941)
- Ardhangi (1940
- Ghar Ki Rani (1940)
- Lapandav (1940)
- Brandy Ki Botal (1939)
- Brahmachari (1938) ( Marathi & Hindi) ( old)
- Jwala (1938)
- Dharmaveer (1937)
- Chhaya (1936)
- Bhikharan (1935)
- Nigah-e-Nafrat (1935)
- Vilasi Ishwar (1935)
- Akashwani (1934)
- Sairandhri (1933)
- Sinhagad (1933)
- Agnikankan: Branded Oath (1932)
- Ayodhyecha Raja (1932)
- Maya Machindra (1932)

== Director ==
- Mandir (1948)
- Jeevan Yatra (1946)
- Subhadra (1946)
- Badi Maa (1945)
- Mazhe Bal (1943)
- Sarkari Pahune (1942)
- Amrit (1941)
- Ardhangi (1940)
- Ghar Ki Rani (1940)
- Lagna Pahave Karun (1940)
- Brandichi Batli (1939)
- Brandy Ki Botal (1939)
- Devata (1939)
- Brahmachari (1938)
- Jwala (1938)
- Dharmaveer (1937)
- Chhaya (1936)
- Nigah-e-Nafrat (1935)
- Vilasi Ishwar (1935)
