= Rukmini Swayamvar =

1946 Bollywood film

- Release date: 1946
- Country: India
- Language: Hindi

Rukmini Swayamvar is a Bollywood film. It was released in 1946.
