= Ashwini Bhave =

Indian actress and producer (born 1967)

Ashvini Bhave
- Born: 7 May 1967 (age 59); Mumbai, Maharashtra, India
- Occupations: Actress; producer
- Years active: 1986–present
- Spouse: Kishore Bopardikar (m. 1997)
- Children: 2

Ashvini Bhave (born 7 May 1967) is an Indian actress and producer known for her work in Marathi, Hindi, and Kannada cinema, as well as Hindi television. One of the most popular actresses in Marathi cinema during the late 1980s and 1990s, she earned acclaim for portraying resilient, emotionally layered women. Over the course of her career, she has received numerous accolades, including two Maharashtra State Film Awards, a Bengal Film Journalists' Association Award, a Zee Chitra Gaurav Puraskar, and three nominations at the Filmfare Marathi Awards.

Bhave began acting while still in school, appearing in the theatre play Gaganbhedi, and made her film debut in 1986 with a leading role in the Marathi family drama Shabas Sunbai. She rose to prominence with notable performances in films such as Ashi Hi Banwa Banwi (1988), Ek Ratra Mantarleli (1989), Kalat Nakalat (1989), and Halad Rusali Kunku Hasla (1991). Her transition to Hindi cinema came with R. K. Films' Henna (1991), which brought her national recognition. She went on to star in a range of successful Hindi films, including Meera Ka Mohan (1992), Sainik (1993), Cheetah (1994), Jurmana (1996), and Bandhan (1998), and earned critical acclaim for her emotionally charged performances in Aahuti (1992), Vazir (1994), Purush (1994), and Sarkarnama (1998). Her Kannada films Sharavegada Saradara (1989) and Vishnu Vijaya (1993) also performed well at the box office.

After taking a sabbatical from films in the early 2000s, Bhave returned with a critically acclaimed performance in Kadachit (2008), which also marked her debut as a producer. In later years, she earned further praise for her roles in Aajcha Divas Majha (2013), Dhyanimani (2017), and Manjha (2017), and for her portrayal of Sakshi Raikar in the web series The Raikar Case (2020). Her 2024 film Gharat Ganpati was both a commercial success and a strong contender on the awards circuit.

Outside of acting, Bhave holds a bachelor's degree in Motion Pictures & Television from the Academy of Art University, San Francisco. She is married to software engineer Kishore Bopardikar, and the couple has two children. Despite relocating to the United States, Bhave has remained an active and respected presence in Indian cinema, particularly in Marathi films.

== Early life ==
Bhave was born on 7 May 1967 in Mumbai, Maharashtra, into a Maharashtrian Kokanastha Brahmin family and grew up in the suburb of Chunabhatti. Her mother, Usha Bhave, was a teacher at Sadhana Vidyalaya, where Ashvini completed her schooling, while her father, Sharad Bhave, was a professor of physical chemistry at SIES College, and she has an elder brother, Atul, who is a civil engineer. While in school, she actively participated in activities such as recitation and elocution competitions. During her tenth-grade summer vacation, she was offered Madhukar Toradmal's Gaganbhedi by the Marathi theatre production company Chandralekha, marking her initial foray into acting. After completing her schooling, Bhave pursued a bachelor's degree in Philosophy from D. G. Ruparel College in Mumbai.

== Career ==
=== Early years and rise in Marathi cinema (1986–1990) ===
Ashvini Bhave began her professional acting journey in the mid-1980s with the Hindi science fiction television series Antariksh, which earned her initial public recognition. She made her film debut in 1986 with the Marathi family drama Shabas Sunbai, directed by Prabhakar Pendharkar, in it, she played a modern young woman who falls for a village boy, portrayed by Ajinkya Deo. Her performance was well received, and the film's success paved the way for a series of prominent roles in Marathi cinema.

Over the next few years, Bhave maintained a steady presence on screen. In 1988, her first major release was the ensemble buddy comedy Ashi Hi Banwa Banwi, directed by Sachin Pilgaonkar, where she starred alongside Ashok Saraf, Laxmikant Berde, Nivedita Joshi, Supriya Pilgaonkar, and Siddharth Ray. Bhave's portrayal of the strict shop employer opposite Saraf was particularly noted, with her appearance in a limbu-coloured (lemon shade) saree becoming an iconic image. The film was a significant commercial success, grossing a record-breaking ₹3 crore (US$320,000) worldwide, making it the highest-grossing Marathi film at the time, and has since achieved cult status. She next appeared in the comedy Gholat Ghol, which followed the story of two unemployed men who adopt disguises to woo women, resulting in a series of humorous romantic mix-ups. That same year, Bhave played the lead in the romantic comedy Kiss Bai Kiss, which revolved around a young couple who conceal their marriage from the girl's wealthy parents, who are against her marrying a poor man, leading to a cascade of comic confusion. Both films co-starred Laxmikant Berde and Nivedita Joshi. Kiss Bai Kiss was later remade in Hindi as Honeymoon (1992), in which Bhave reprised her role opposite Rishi Kapoor and Varsha Usgaonkar. However, the Hindi adaptation received only an average response and did not match the success of the original.

In 1989, Bhave appeared in Ek Ratra Mantarleli, a mystery thriller directed by Kumar Sohoni, portrayed a composed heiress caught in a night of supernatural chaos, alongside veteran actors Nilu Phule and Shriram Lagoo. The film is regarded as one of the finest thrillers in Marathi cinema. That year, she also featured in Smita Talwalkar's acclaimed family drama Kalat Nakalat, where she played a widow secretary who has a one-night stand with her married boss. The film was both a critical and commercial success, praised for its sensitive portrayal of family conflict, and went on to win several National and Maharashtra State Film Awards. Bhave also made her Kannada film debut in Sharavegada Saradara, which was notable for being the first Kannada film released in the 70mm format and was a box-office success.

She played a police sub-inspector in Mahesh Kothare's action-comedy Dhadakebaaz (1990). The film was the first Marathi production to be shot in CinemaScope format and emerged as a commercial success.

=== Establishment in Hindi films (1991–1998) ===
During 1991, she starred in the Marathi family drama Halad Rusali Kunku Hasla as a strong-willed woman who rejects a privileged suitor after he questions her integrity, choosing instead to marry a disabled man and face societal and familial backlash. The film proved to be a major success and significantly increased her popularity, becoming the household name in Maharashtra. During a photoshoot for Chanderi magazine with renowned photographer Gautam Rajadhyaksha, Bhave was recommended by him to Randhir Kapoor, who had called in search of a suitable actress for his upcoming film. He recommended Bhave, which ultimately led to her debut in Hindi cinema with R. K. Films' Henna, a cross-border romantic drama directed by Randhir Kapoor. In the film, she played Chandni, the devoted fiancée of Chandar Prakash (Rishi Kapoor), who is presumed dead after an accident in Kashmir. Though cast in a secondary role, her dignified portrayal, along with the poignant song picturised on her, "Der Na Ho Jaye Kahin", earned her praise from both critics and audiences. Henna was a major commercial success, earning around ₹12 crore (US$1.3 million) at the box office, and was selected as India's official entry for the Academy Award for Best Foreign Language Film. The film helped her gain broader recognition among Hindi-speaking audiences.

Her next Hindi release was the musical drama Meera Ka Mohan, in which she played the lead role of a woman whose friendship with another man is misunderstood by her husband, triggering emotional turmoil, courtroom conflict, and a test of trust. The film received a mixed response and proved to be an average grosser. That year also saw Bhave feature in three Marathi film releases, each showcasing her versatility across genres. In the comedy Than Than Gopal, she portrayed a smart and bold aspiring actress who exposes the deceit of the male protagonist by disguising herself as an elderly woman; in the crime thriller Zunj Tujhi Majhi, she played a supporting role in a story about a determined police officer seeking justice for his father's death while confronting corruption, resistance, and the sudden disappearance of his lover; and in Aahuti, she delivered one of her most acclaimed performances as a woman betrayed by her lover and forced into a marriage of convenience, who endures exploitation but ultimately fights to protect her dignity and her daughter, an emotionally charged role that earned her the Maharashtra State Film Award for Best Actress.

Yash Chopra's ensemble action drama Parampara was her first release of 1993, where she played a unifying presence in a fractured family, selflessly raising her husband's illegitimate child as her own and striving to end a long-standing generational feud. The film featured an ensemble cast including Sunil Dutt, Vinod Khanna, Aamir Khan, Saif Ali Khan, and Ramya Krishnan. Bhave portrayed the mother of both Saif and Aamir's characters, despite being of a similar age range. Though highly anticipated, Parampara opened to negative reviews and was a commercial failure. She was paired opposite Akshay Kumar in three releases that year. In Kayda Kanoon, she portrayed a dual role in a crime drama centered around a principled man's battle against injustice after suffering personal tragedy. She then starred in Sainik, playing the devoted wife of an army officer who silently bears the grief of his presumed death while protecting their family from emotional collapse; the film was a semi-hit at the box office. In the bilingual Vishnu Vijaya, directed by Keshu Ramsay, where she played the wife of ACP Vishnu (Vishnuvardhan), whose marriage is strained when her past with Vijay (Kumar) resurfaces, causing emotional turmoil before trust is ultimately restored. The Kannada version of the film was a superhit, while the Hindi version failed commercially.

In 1994, Bhave continued to work across both Hindi and Marathi cinema. She starred in the delayed crime drama Chauraha, opposite Jackie Shroff and Jeetendra, and also reunited with her Henna co-stars Rishi Kapoor and Zeba Bakhtiar in K. C. Bokadia's Mohabbat Ki Arzoo, a romantic drama with altered plot twists in which her character dies instead of Bakhtiar's, as in the original film. The film, however, failed at the box office. She also played a doctor in the action thriller Cheetah, opposite Mithun Chakraborty, which was a remake of the 1990 American film Hard to Kill, and turned out to be a commercial success, earning ₹6.74 crore (US$720,000). She made a guest appearance in the action-comedy Ekka Raja Rani, alongside Govinda and Vinod Khanna. Her fourth and final collaboration with Akshay Kumar came in Zakhmi Dil, a romantic drama about two childhood lovers separated by misunderstandings; the film received negative reviews and had a modest box office run. In Marathi cinema, she had two releases that year. In Mayechi Sawli, she played a Tamasha dancer who dies giving birth to her daughter, and in the crime drama Vazir, she portrayed a traumatized survivor of sexual assault, who is emotionally manipulated by her husband, played by Vikram Gokhale, for his own political ambitions. Manasi Joshi of Kalakruti Media remarked, "Bhave got a good strong role in this film and she did a great job of it," praising her emotionally layered performance. One of her most powerful performances in Hindi cinema came in Purush, where she starred opposite Irrfan Khan, depicted the harrowing story of a schoolteacher who is raped by a powerful politician and, after being denied justice, takes the law into her own hands, ultimately imprisoned and entrusting her child to her sister before her execution. Bhave's performances in the critically acclaimed Vazir and Purush earned her a Filmfare Marathi nomination for Best Actress and the Bengal Film Journalists' Association Award for Best Actress (Hindi), respectively.

Her film Jurmana, directed by T. L. V. Prasad, was one of her commercially successful ventures, earning ₹9.97 crore (US$1.1 million) at the worldwide box office. She also received critical praise for her performance in Aruna Raje's romantic drama Bhairavi, in which she portrayed Ragini, a blind but gifted woman who finds love and happiness after a life marked by personal loss, only to be left devastated when her husband mysteriously disappears, accused of fraud and theft.

In 1997, she had three releases, including the action drama Judge Mujrim, in which she played a police inspector opposite Suniel Shetty in a film that had an average box office run. That year also marked her final Kannada release, Rangena Halliyage Rangada Rangegowda, a romantic drama co-starring Ambareesh and Ramesh Aravind, about a man whose hidden identity leads to love, tragedy, and ultimately raising his late wife's child with another woman. From 1996 to 1997, Bhave was also part of the Hindi television series Yug, a fictionalized account of India's freedom struggle showcasing various revolutionaries. Additionally, she was cast as the warrior-princess Mastani in Asmita Chitra's historical series Rau, opposite Manoj Joshi as Peshwa Bajirao I and Smita Talwalkar as Kashibai. The following year, she appeared in two Hindi films in supporting roles. In Partho Ghosh's Yugpurush, she acted alongside Nana Patekar, and in K. Murali Mohana Rao's Bandhan, a remake of the Tamil film Pandithurai (1992), she portrayed a loyal wife whose peaceful life is disrupted when her husband (Jackie Shroff) takes a second wife under pressure and manipulation, leading to betrayal and tragedy. Her character eventually finds justice through the efforts of her devoted brother, played by Salman Khan. Bandhan was a commercial success, earning ₹21.45 crore (US$2.3 million) worldwide, and marked her final appearance in a Hindi film. In Marathi cinema, she delivered another powerful performance in Shravani Deodhar's political drama Sarkarnama, portraying a journalist who initially overlooks suspicious clues but ultimately becomes a key witness to political brutality. The film received widespread acclaim from critics and audiences alike and went on to win multiple awards, including the Filmfare, Screen, and Maharashtra State awards.

=== Comeback and intermittent work (2008–Present) ===
After a decade-long sabbatical, Bhave made a notable comeback with Kadachit (2008), a Marathi family drama directed by Chandrakant Kulkarni. The film centers around a daughter who accuses her father of murdering her mother, only to later question his guilt. Bhave played a neurosurgeon caught between her professional acumen and emotional turmoil, a role that earned her widespread critical acclaim. A critic from Kalakruti Media praised her performance, stating, “Her acting at every stage of her journey from a confident neurosurgeon to a self-aware Gayatri is admirable.” Kadachit also marked her debut as a producer and earned her Best Actress awards at the MaTa Sanman, Screen Awards, and Maharashtra State Awards, along with a nomination at the Zee Chitra Gaurav Puraskar, while the film was nominated for Best Indian Film at the Mumbai International Film Festival.

She went on to collaborate with director Kulkarni in two more significant projects. In Aajcha Divas Majha (2013), a political drama inspired by the life of Maharashtra's former Chief Minister A. R. Antulay, Bhave played the female lead in a story that explores the moral dilemmas faced by those in power. The film won the National Film Award for Best Feature Film in Marathi. She followed this with Dhyanimani (2017), an adaptation of the acclaimed Marathi play, co-produced by Mahesh Manjrekar and also directed by Kulkarni. In the psychological thriller, Bhave portrayed an overprotective mother, originally played by Neena Kulkarni in the stage version. The performance drew mixed critical reactions, with The Times of India critic Mihir Bhanage noting, “Bhave goes overboard at times, but that actually adds authenticity to her portrayal.” Despite the varied reviews, Dhyanimani was listed among the best Marathi films of the year. Also in 2017, Bhave starred in Manjha, a psychological drama where she played a single mother who refuses to remain silent in the face of abuse. The character takes a strong stand against her son's friend to protect her child, portraying quiet strength and resilience. A critic commented, “She plays a typical single mother who is strong enough to save her kid from any difficulties he faces in life.” For her performance, Bhave received a nomination for the Filmfare Marathi Award for Best Actress (Critics).

In 2020, she returned to the screen in Aditya Sarpotdar's murder-mystery web series The Raikar Case, released on Voot, where she starred alongside Atul Kulkarni. Playing Sakshi Raikar, the matriarch and emotional anchor of a powerful yet fractured family, Bhave delivered a layered performance that was well received by audiences and critics. Avinash Ramachandran of The New Indian Express praised her, writing, “Ashwini is brilliant as Sakshi, who undergoes a rollercoaster of emotions as she comes to terms with every secret, every catastrophe, and has a few skeletons of her own in the closet.” Bhave earned high praise for her performance in Navjyot Bandiwadekar's family drama Gharat Ganpati (2024), which revolves around an annual family tradition in Konkan and how it is cherished while navigating generational differences and strengthening familial bonds. She portrayed a strong-willed, possessive mother alongside Bhushan Pradhan, Nikita Dutta, and Ajinkya Deo, marking her reunion with Deo after twenty-five years. The film earned ₹4.75 crore (US$510,000) at the box office, becoming the tenth highest-grossing Marathi film of 2024, and was among the top six contenders being considered as India's entry for the Best International Feature Film category at the Academy Awards. Her performance garnered the Zee Chitra Gaurav Puraskar and nominations for Best Supporting Actress at the MaTa Sanman and Filmfare Marathi Awards.

== Personal life ==
Bhave married software engineer Kishore Bopardikar on 26 July 1997. The two met during the filming of Bandhan (1997) in Hyderabad, and after a period of courtship, they tied the knot. Following their marriage, the couple relocated to the United States and settled in the San Francisco Bay Area. They have two children: a son named Sameer and a daughter named Sachi. In 2002, while residing in the U.S., Bhave earned a bachelor's degree in Motion Pictures & Television from the Academy of Art University.

== Filmography ==
=== Films ===
Year	Title	Role	Language	Notes
1986	Shabas Sunbai	Ratan Inamdar	Marathi	
1987	Rajlakshmi	Jamuna	Hindi	Film version of series Shrikant (1987)
1988	Ashi Hi Banwa Banwi	Madhuri	Marathi	
1988	Kiss Bai Kiss	Gauri	Marathi	
1988	Gholat Ghol	Madhu Kulkarni	Marathi	
1989	Ek Ratra Mantarleli	Padma	Marathi	
1989	Kalat Nakalat	Manisha Salkar	Marathi	
1989	Sharavegada Saradara	Teja's love interest	Kannada	
1990	Dhadakebaaz	PSI Uma Jadhav	Marathi	
1990	Baap Re Baap	Anju	Marathi	
1991	Henna	Chandani Kaul	Hindi	
1991	Halad Rusli Kunku Hasla	Gauri	Marathi	
1992	Sagle Sarkhech	Madhavi Jagdale	Marathi	
1992	Meera Ka Mohan	Meera	Hindi	
1992	Naya Sawan	Kavita	Hindi	Unreleased
1992	Bank Robbery		Hindi	Unreleased
1992	Honeymoon	Lata	Hindi	
1992	Than Than Gopal	Priya / Radha Jawalkar	Marathi	
1992	Aahuti	Aasha Sathe	Marathi	
1992	Zunj Tujhi Majhi	Reshma Phadke	Marathi	
1993	Parampara	Rajeshwari	Hindi	
1993	Kayda Kanoon	Shehnaz Lucknowi / Maria D'Souza	Hindi	
1993	Sainik	Alka	Hindi	
1993	Vishnu Vijaya	Anita	Kannada	
1993	Vishnu Vijaya	Anita	Hindi	Released as Ashaant
1993	Janmathep	Kasturi	Marathi	
1994	Vazir	Kamal Kamble	Marathi	
1994	Chauraha	Poonam	Hindi	
1994	Mohabbat Ki Arzoo	Shalu Singh	Hindi	
1994	Cheetah	Dr. Anita Kedarnath	Hindi	
1994	Ekka Raja Rani	Asha	Hindi	
1994	Zakhmi Dil	Gayatri	Hindi	
1994	Mayechi Sawli	Radha Shehnaiwale	Marathi	
1994	Chal Gammat Karu		Marathi	
1994	Purush	Ambika Apte	Hindi	
1995	Vapsi Sajan Ki	Pooja	Hindi	
1996	Jurmana	Adv. Kiran Saxena	Hindi	
1996	Shastra		Hindi	Special appearance
1996	Bhairavi	Ragini Sridhar	Hindi	
1997	Rangena Halliyage Rangada Rangegowda	Kasthuri	Kannada	
1997	Police Station		Hindi	
1997	Judge Mujrim	Insp. Ashwini Sinha	Hindi	
1998	Yugpurush	Deepti	Hindi	
1998	Bandhan	Pooja Thakur	Hindi	
1998	Sarkarnama	Vaijayanti Patil	Marathi	
1999	Teri Mohabbat Ke Naam	Amrita	Hindi	
2008	Kadachit	Dr. Gayatri Pradhan	Marathi	
2013	Aajcha Divas Majha	Mrs. Mohite	Marathi	
2017	Dhyanimani	Shalini Pathak (Shalu)	Marathi	
2017	Manjha	Samidha	Marathi	
2024	The Still Life Of An Actor	Nina	English	Short film
2024	Gharat Ganpati	Ahilya Sharad Gharat	Marathi	
2024	Gulaabi	Gauri Apte	Marathi	

=== Television ===
- Partners
- Apne Paraye
- Antariksh
- Shrikant (1987) as Jamuna
- Yug (1997) as Rukmani
- Rau (1997) as Mastani

=== Theatre ===
- Gaganbhedi
- Lagnachi Bedi
- Vasuchi Sasu

=== Web series ===
Year	Film	Role	Language
2020	The Raikar Case	Sakshi Naik Raikar	Hindi

=== Producer ===
- Kadachit (2007)
- The Human Experiment (2013)

== Awards and nominations ==
Year	Awards	Category	Work	Result	Ref.
1993	Maharashtra State Film Award	Best Actress	Aahuti	Won	
1994	Filmfare Marathi Awards	Best Actress	Vazir	Nominated	
1994	Bengal Film Journalists' Association Awards	Best Actress (Hindi)	Purush	Won	
2008	Maharashtra State Film Award	Best Actress	Kadachit	Won	
2008	Mumbai International Film Festival	Best Indian Film	Kadachit	Nominated	
2009	MaTa Sanman	Best Actress	Kadachit	Won	
2009	Zee Chitra Gaurav Puraskar	Best Actress	Kadachit	Nominated	
2009	Star Screen Awards	Best Actress	Kadachit	Won	
2018	Filmfare Marathi Awards	Best Actress Critics	Manjha	Nominated	
2025	Zee Chitra Gaurav Puraskar	Best Supporting Actress	Gharat Ganpati	Won	
2025	NDTV Marathi Entertainment Awards	Best Actress in a Supporting Role	Gharat Ganpati	Nominated	
2025	MaTa Sanman	Best Supporting Actress	Gharat Ganpati	Nominated	
2025	Filmfare Marathi Awards	Best Supporting Actress	Gharat Ganpati	Nominated	

== See also ==
- List of Indian film actresses
