= Ek Ratra Mantarleli =

1989 Indian Marathi-language film

- Theatrical release poster
- Directed by: Kumar Sohoni
- Written by: Suresh Khare; Kumar Sohoni
- Produced by: Kumar Sohoni
- Starring: Ashwini Bhave; Nilu Phule; Prashant Damle; Shriram Lagoo; Asawari Joshi; Sanjay Mone; Ashutosh Gowarikar
- Cinematography: Suryakant Lavande
- Edited by: Ashok Patwardhan
- Music by: Anil Mohile
- Production company: Kuso Films
- Release date: 1989
- Country: India
- Language: Marathi

Ek Ratra Mantarleli is a 1989 Indian Marathi-language mystery thriller film co-written and directed by Kumar Sohoni, produced under the banner of Kuso Films. The film features Ashwini Bhave, Asawari Joshi, Shriram Lagoo, Nilu Phule, Prashant Damle, Sanjay Mone, Ashutosh Gowarikar.

== Plot ==
Two decades after Sardar Jagtap (Vasant Ingle) died, his lawyer, Pradhan (Shriram Lagoo), finally went to Sardar's house to read his will. The house had been taken care of by the loyal servant, Ramsharan (Nilu Phule), who stayed there all these years. Pradhan was waiting for Sardar's family members, aged between 20 and 30, to arrive.

When everyone was there, Pradhan started reading the will, which was in three envelopes. The second envelope revealed that Padma (Ashwini Bhave) would be the owner of everything. Pradhan didn't bother opening the third envelope because Padma seemed perfectly normal.

But then, weird things started happening in the house. Ramsharan said he saw the spirit of Sardar's dead son Shekhar (Ashutosh Gowariker), and the night became stranger. Pradhan even disappeared, and another mysterious figure joined the spooky happenings. The whole night turned into a spooky and confusing experience for everyone left in the house.

== Cast ==
- Ashwini Bhave as Padma
- Asawari Joshi as Surekha
- Shriram Lagoo as Solicitor Pradhan
- Nilu Phule as Ramsharan
- Prashant Damle as Manohar
- Sanjay Mone as Chandrakant
- Ashutosh Gowariker as Shekhar
- Jaywant Wadkar as Shankar
- Makarand Deshpande as Mohite
- Vasant Ingle as Sardar Jagtap
- Rahul Solapurkar as Doctor
- Madhukar Toradmal
- Uday Mithbavkar
