= Bhalji Pendharkar =

Indian film director and producer (1897–1994)

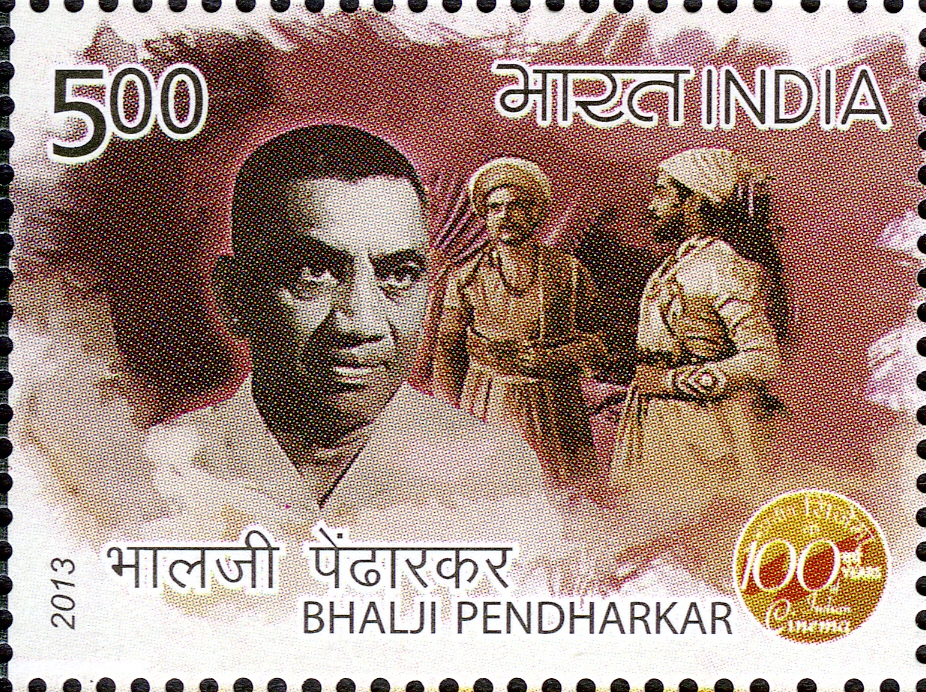
- Pendharkar on a 2013 stamp of India
- Born: Bhalji Gopal Pendharkar; 3 May 1897; Kolhapur, Kolhapur State, India
- Died: 26 November 1994 (aged 97); Kolhapur, Maharashtra, India
- Occupations: Film director; producer; writer
- Spouses: Saraswati Pendharkar; Leela Chandragiri
- Awards: Dadasaheb Phalke Award (1991)

Bhalji Pendharkar (3 May 1897 – 26 November 1994), was an Indian film director, producer, screenwriter and actor who worked mainly in Marathi cinema. He was known for films based on historical, social and cultural themes, particularly stories connected with Chhatrapati Shivaji Maharaj and the Maratha period. He was honoured in 1991 with Dadasaheb Phalke Award, the highest national film award for cinema artists.

Pendharkar began his career in theatre and later worked in the film industry in the 1920s. He was associated with filmmaking in Kolhapur and worked in different departments of film production before becoming a director. He founded Jayaprabha Studio, which became associated with Marathi film production. His films often combined historical subjects with themes of courage, social values, duty and cultural identity. Some of his notable films include Chhatrapati Shivaji (1933), Maharathi Karna (1944) (1953), Mohityanchi Manjula (1963), Sadhi Mansa (1965), and Tambadi Maati (1969).

== Early life ==
Pendharkar was born on 3 May 1988 in Kolhapur. His father Gopal Pendharkar was a well-known doctor in the city. From childhood, Pendharkar was interested in observing life and thinking independently. He enjoyed swimming and outdoor sports. He left school after completing the sixth standard. After leaving home, he worked for some time at the Kesari newspaper in Pune. He later returned to Kolhapur and worked for a period in the Maratha Light Infantry. He subsequently entered theatre and wrote and acted in nearly six plays. Several of his relatives were also active in the Indian film industry, including his elder brother Baburao Pendharkar, his half-brother Master Vinayak, and his cousin V. Shantaram.

== Personal life ==
Pendharkar was married twice. He first married Savitri Pendharkar. They had a son named Prabhakar Pendharkar who was associated with the production of Do Ankhen Barah Haath. He later wrote the book Rarang Dhang and directed documentaries.

His second wife, Leela Chandragiri, appeared in Hindi and Marathi films during the 1930s under the screen name Miss Leela. She had two children from a previous marriage, a son named Jayasingh and a daughter named Madhavi. He adopted both children. His adopted daughter later married novelist Ranjit Desai. She wrote the book Naach Ga Ghumaa and died in 2013. His other was Saroj Chindarkar. He named his studio Jayaprabha, combining the names of his adopted son Jayasingh and his son Prabhakar.

== Career ==
Pendharkar began his professional life as a journalist associated with the Marathi newspaper Kesari. He later turned towards theatre and wrote several plays before entering the film industry. His early interest in writing, performance, make-up and stagecraft helped him develop the range of skills that he would subsequently use in silent and sound cinema. During the early 1920s, he became associated with the Maharashtra Film Company in Kolhapur, one of the important centres of early Indian filmmaking. The studio, founded by Baburao Painter.

=== Silent-film period ===
One of Pendharkar’s earliest known film-related works was his association with Prithvi Vallabh, a silent film made in collaboration with N. D. Sarpotdar and other filmmakers. Pendharkar was involved in its writing and also appeared as an actor.

Pendharkar also wrote Bajirao Mastani, a silent film made in the mid-1920s. The film was based on the historical romance associated with Peshwa Bajirao I and Mastani. His interest in historical subjects, particularly stories connected with the Maratha period, became a recurring feature of his later career. In 1927, he directed and produced Vande Mataram Ashram. The film was a silent production and was connected with contemporary nationalist and educational concerns. In 1929, He was associated with the film Raj Hriday as a writer. During this phase, he continued to work across different departments of production and gradually moved towards independent direction.

=== Transition to sound cinema ===
The arrival of sound transformed the Indian film industry at the beginning of the 1930s. Pendharkar adapted to the new technology and began directing films that combined historical, mythological and social subjects with dialogue, music and performance. In 1932, he directed Shyam Sundar. The film became one of the important early successes of Marathi cinema and is commonly described as the first Marathi film to complete a silver jubilee run. Its success established Pendharkar as a significant filmmaker in the Marathi film industry.

During the 1930s, He directed a series of films based on mythological, historical and devotional themes. In 1934, he directed Partha Kumar and Akashwani. He was also credited as a writer for Akashwani. In 1935, he directed Muraliwala and Kalia Mardan. These films reflected the popularity of mythological and devotional narratives during the early sound period, when stories from Hindu mythology were frequently adapted for the screen. In 1936, He directed Savitri and Rukmani Kalyanam. The following year, he directed and wrote Kanhopatra, a film based on the life and devotional tradition associated with the saint-poet Kanhopatra. In 1938, he directed Raja Gopichand. In 1939, he directed, produced and wrote Netaji Palkar. The latter was based on the life of Netaji Palkar, a military commander associated with Chhatrapati Shivaji Maharaj. The film marked an important stage in Pendharkar’s development as a filmmaker of historical subjects. His treatment of the Maratha past would later become one of the defining characteristics of his work.

=== Historical and mythological films during the 1940s ===
During the 1940s, Pendharkar continued to work prolifically. In 1940, he directed Gorakhnath and Alakh Niranjan. These films drew upon religious, spiritual and mythological traditions. In 1941, he directed and wrote Thoratanchi Kamala. The film combined a historical setting with dramatic and social elements.

In 1942, Pendharkar directed Soonbai and Bhakta Damaji. Bhakta Damaji was based on the devotional figure Damaji and continued his interest in saint biographies and religious narratives. In 1943, he directed Bahirji Naik, a film centred on the famous intelligence officer associated with Shivaji’s administration. The subject further strengthened his association with Maratha history. In 1944, He directed Swarna Bhoomi and Maharathi Karna. The latter was based on Karna, one of the central figures of the Mahabharata. By moving between Maratha history, pan-Indian mythology and devotional narratives, Pendharkar developed a broad body of work that was not restricted to one genre. In 1946, he directed Valmiki and Sasurvaas. He was also credited as a writer for Sasurvaas. These films indicate the range of subjects he explored during the period: while Valmiki drew upon a mythological and literary figure, Sasurvaas dealt with a domestic and social theme.

=== Post-Independence period ===
After Indian independence, Pendharkar continued directing films while retaining his interest in history, social values and cultural identity. In 1949, he directed Meeth Bhakar. In 1950, he directed Shilanganache Sone and Mee Daru Sodli. The latter dealt with the subject of alcoholism and reform, showing that his work was not limited to historical or mythological films.

In 1952, Pendharkar directed, produced and wrote Chhatrapati Shivaji. The film focused on the life and legacy of Chhatrapati Shivaji Maharaj and represented one of the clearest expressions of Pendharkar’s historical interests. His historical films generally emphasised courage, loyalty, duty, sacrifice and resistance to injustice. They also contributed to the representation of Maratha history in popular cinema. In 1953, he directed Mazi Zameen. In 1954, he directed Maharani Yesubai, a film based on the historical figure associated with the Maratha royal family. In 1955, he directed Yere Majhya Maglya. The following year, he directed Pawankhind, a historical film based on the Battle of Pavan Khind and the sacrifice of Baji Prabhu Deshpande. The film became one of the significant historical works associated with Pendharkar’s name. In 1957, he directed Naikinicha Sazza. In 1959, he directed Akashganga, for which he was also credited as a writer. These films show that Pendharkar continued to alternate between historical subjects, social narratives and stories dealing with human relationships.

=== Later films ===
During the 1960s, Pendharkar continued to direct films dealing with Maratha history and social themes. In 1963, he directed Mohityanchi Manjula. The film was set against a historical background. He was also associated with the writing of Thoratanchi Kamla during this period. In 1964, He directed Maratha Tituka Melvava. The title referred to the idea of Maratha unity and reflected his continuing engagement with the history and political culture of the Maratha period. In 1965, he directed Sadhi Mansa, a social film. Unlike his historical productions, the film focused on contemporary social concerns and demonstrated his ability to work outside the historical genre. The film won National Film Award for Best Feature Film in Marathi.

In 1969, Pendharkar directed Tambdi Maati. The film is regarded as one of his important later works and received national recognition. He won National Film Award for Best Feature Film in Marathi. It dealt with rural life and social conditions, and its subject marked a movement towards a more grounded representation of village society. After a long career in filmmaking, Pendharkar directed Ganimi Kawa in 1981. It is generally identified as his last directorial film. The film’s title referred to the guerrilla-war strategy associated with Maratha military history.

In 1986, he wrote and produced Shabas Sunbai. By this stage, he had largely moved away from regular direction but continued to be associated with film production and writing. His career therefore extended from the silent-film era to the later decades of Marathi cinema, covering the transition from silent films to talkies, the studio period, post-Independence filmmaking and the development of modern Marathi cinema.

=== Working methods and themes ===
Pendharkar worked in several capacities during his career. Apart from directing, he was involved in writing stories and screenplays, producing films, acting and make-up. His early experience in theatre and studio production contributed to his ability to supervise different aspects of filmmaking. He was particularly known for historical films, especially those connected with Chhatrapati Shivaji Maharaj, the Maratha period and figures from Maratha history.

Pendharkar’s career also had a strong connection with Kolhapur. The city was an important centre of early Marathi filmmaking, and his work helped maintain that connection across several decades. Through films made during the silent era and the sound era, he became associated with the preservation and popularisation of historical narratives in Marathi cinema.

== Filmography ==
Year	Film	Language	Role	Notes
1924	Prithvi Vallabh	Silent film	Actor	Debut film
1925	Bajirao Mastani	Silent film	Director	Direction debut
1927	Vande Mataram Ashram	Silent film	Director	Also writer & producer
1931	Rani Rupmati	Silent film	Director	
1932	Shyam Sundar	Marathi & Hindi	Director	First silver jubilee film in India
1934	Akashwani	Marathi & Hindi	Director	Also writer
1934	Partha Kumar	Marathi & Hindi	Director	
1935	Kalia Mardan	Hindi	Director	
1935	Muraliwala	Hindi	Director	
1936	Rukmani Kalyanam	Tamil	Director	
1936	Savitri	Hindi	Director	
1937	Kanhopatra	Hindi	Director	Also writer
1938	Raja Gopichand	Hindi & Marathi	Director	
1939	Netaji Palkar	Marathi	Director	Also writer & producer
1940	Alakh Niranjan	Hindi	Director	
1940	Gorakhnath	Hindi & Marathi	Director	
1941	Thoratanchi Kamala	Marathi	Director	
1942	Bhakta Damaji	Marathi	Director	
1942	Soonbai	Marathi	Director	
1943	Bahirji Naik	Marathi	Director	
1944	Maharathi Karna	Hindi	Director	
1944	Swarna Bhoomi	Hindi	Director	
1946	Valmiki	Tamil	Director	
1946	Sasurvaas	Marathi	Director	
1949	Meeth Bhakar	Marathi	Director	
1950	Mee Daru Sodli	Marathi	Director	
1950	Shilanganache Sone	Marathi	Director	
1952	Chhatrapati Shivaji	Marathi	Director	
1953	Mazi Zameen	Marathi	Director	
1954	Maharani Yesubai	Marathi	Director	
1955	Yere Mazya Maglya	Marathi	Director	
1956	Pavankhind	Marathi	Director	
1957	Naikinicha Sazza	Marathi	Director	
1959	Akashganga	Marathi	Director	
1963	Mohityanchi Manjula	Marathi	Director	
1964	Maratha Tituka Melwawa	Marathi	Director	
1965	Sadhi Mansa	Marathi	Director	
1969	Tambadi Mati	Marathi	Director	
1981	Ganimi Kawa	Marathi	Director	
1986	Shabas Sunbai	Marathi	Producer	
