= Yeh Raat Phir Na Aayegi =

Yeh Raat Phir Na Aayegi (lit. 'This Night Won't Come Again') may refer to these Indian films:

- Yeh Raat Phir Na Aayegi (1966 film), a 1966 Bollywood film
- Yeh Raat Phir Na Aayegi (1992 film), a 1992 Bollywood film
