= Shabas Sunbai =

- Theatrical release poster
- Directed by: Prabhakar Pendharkar
- Written by: Bhalji Pendharkar
- Produced by: Bhalji Pendharkar
- Starring: Ajinkya Deo; Ashwini Bhave
- Cinematography: Vasant Shinde
- Edited by: Madhu Prabhavalkar
- Music by: Meena Mangeshkar
- Production company: Soham Chitra
- Release date: 1986
- Running time: 111 minutes
- Country: India
- Language: Marathi

Shabas Sunbai (transl. Well done daughter-in-law) is an Indian Marathi-language family drama film directed by Prabhakar Pendharkar and produced by Bhalji Pendharkar, starring Ajinkya Deo and debutant Ashwini Bhave in the lead roles.

== Plot ==
A modern girl falls in love with a simple village boy but is accepted by his family as she decides to win everyone's hearts to earn a place in the family.

== Cast ==
- Ajinkya Deo as Ratan Inamdar
- Ashwini Bhave as Ajinkya
- Madhukar Toradmal
- Chittaranjan Kolhatkar
- Kishore Jadhav
- Vijay Kadam
- Daulat Mutalekar
- Manikraj
- Bapusaheb Gawde
- Vasant Latkar
- Appasaheb Jadhav
- Chhaya Sagaonkar
- Shaila Neverekar
- Shobha Shiralkar

== Production ==
The film was produced at Jayprabha Studio in Kolhapur. Ashwini Bhave made her debut in Marathi cinema as lead actress alongside Ajinkya Deo. Madhukar Toradmal, Vijay Kadam, Chittaranjan Kolhatkar, Kishore Jadhav, Shobha Shiralkar also portrayed prominent roles in the film.

== Soundtrack ==
Shabas Sunbai

Soundtrack album by Meena Mangeshkar
- Released: 1986
- Genre: Feature film soundtrack
- Length: 16:43
- Language: Marathi
- Label: Ishtar Music

Official audio
- Shabas Sunbai - Full Album on YouTube

All music is composed by Meena Mangeshkar.

Track listing
No.	Title	Lyrics	Singer(s)	Length
1.	"Sukh He Vaate Have Have"	Sudhir Moghe	Lata Mangeshkar	3:53
2.	"Maay Bhavani Tujhe Lekaru"	Sudhir Moghe	Lata Mangeshkar	4:09
3.	"Aadhi Hote Itaradi"	Sudhir Moghe	Usha Mangeshkar, Shrikant Pargawkar	3:30
4.	"Navratricha Utsav Kela"	Yogesh	Chorus	3:42
5.	"Durge Durghatbhari"	Traditional	Shrikant Pargaonkar, Chorus	1:22
Total length:				16:43
