= Baidurya Rahasya =

1985 Bengali thriller movie

Baidurya Rahasya (বৈদুর্য রহস্য)
- Directed by: Tapan Sinha
- Story by: Tapan Sinha
- Produced by: Snehendu Bikash Gope
- Starring: Basanta Choudhury; Moon Moon Sen; Tapas Paul; Manoj Mitra
- Production company: Saraswati Chitram
- Release date: 1985
- Running time: 174 Minutes
- Country: India
- Language: Bengali

Baidurya Rahasya (Mystery of the Electric Gem) is a Bengali thriller movie directed by Tapan Sinha. This movie was released on 8 May 1985 under the banner of Saraswati Chitram. Storylining and music direction was also done by Tapan Sinha.

== Plot ==
An invaluable emerald was stolen from a Lord Krishna's temple in an island, that was insured for Rs. 8 lakhs. The insurance company appointed Hindusthan detective agency for investigation. The Head of the Detective agency Mr. Madan Bose went to the temple with his assistant to meet the Mohanta Maharaj of the temple. On the other hand, two young ladies went to the temple as devotees of lord Krishna. Without informing the local police they started investigation secretly. There are some mysterious people like young researcher, priest Nityananda, and Singh ji, trustee of the temple. When old garden keeper Charandas was brutally killed by a masked man in the night, the police started a parallel investigation. Finally it was revealed that not only theft but another murder was committed in the temple few days ago. The true culprit was identified and the jewel retrieved at last.

== Starring ==
- Basanta Choudhury - Head of the Temple, Mohanta, and smuggler (dual role)
- Moon Moon Sen - Devotee/Rangita
- Alpana Goswami - Devotee/Sangita
- Manoj Mitra - Madan Bose, Head of Detective agency
- Tapas Paul - Researcher/Indrajit Sarkar, S.I.
- Dulal Lahiri - Mr. Rakhsit
- Nirmal Kumar - Prithish Ganguly, Manager of Insurance Company
- Ramen Roychoudhury - Nityananda
- Bhishma Guhathakurata - Assistant of Madan Bose
- Ujjal Sengupta - Mr. Ghosh, Police Inspector

== Songs ==
no	Song	Singer
1	"Momo Giridhari Nacho"	Lily Sen
2	"Kanu Heno Gunonidhi"	Sreetama Gope, Lily Sen, Tapan Sinha
3	"Bela Jay Shyam Rai"	Ajoy Chakraborty
4	"Nain mein Nandalal"	Ajay Chakraborty
