= Chauraha =

- Theatrical release poster
- Directed by: Sadaqat Hussain
- Written by: Javed Siddique; Tahir Khan (dialogues)
- Screenplay by: Sadaqat Hussain; Javed Siddique
- Story by: Sadaqat Hussain
- Produced by: Pradeep Shirodkar
- Starring: Jeetendra; Jackie Shroff; Jaya Prada; Ashwini Bhave
- Cinematography: Kamal Bose
- Edited by: Prashant Khedekar; Vinod Nayak
- Music by: Laxmikant-Pyarelal
- Production company: Revathi Films
- Release date: 8 April 1994
- Running time: 162 minutes
- Country: India
- Language: Hindi

Chauraha (transl.Crossroads) is a 1994 Hindi-language action film, produced by Pradeep Shirodkar under the Revathi Films banner and directed by Sadaqat Hussain. The film stars Jeetendra, Jaya Prada, Jackie Shroff, Ashwini Bhave with music composed by Laxmikant-Pyarelal.

== Cast ==
- Jeetendra as Inspector Kailash Mathur
- Jaya Prada as Pooja Mathur
- Jackie Shroff as Amar
- Ashwini Bhave as Poonam
- Shakti Kapoor as Inspector Bankelal
- Sadashiv Amrapurkar as Kalinath / Badrinath
- Danny Denzongpa as Baba Bhatti
- Alok Nath as Masterji
- Avtar Gill as Tiwari
- Vikas Anand as IGP
- Yunus Parvez as Ibrahim, hotel owner
- Javed Khan as Prem
- Bharat Kapoor as Police Commissioner
- Farha Naaz as Dancer
- Dilip Dhawan as Raman
- Sulabha Deshpande as Mrs. D'Souza
- Shagufta Ali as Jerry D'Souza
- Shammi as Dai Maa
- Deep Dhillon as Girdhari
- Dan Dhanoa as Snaky
- Mac Mohan as Mac
- Mehmood Jr. as goon under Girdhari

== Soundtrack ==
Song	Singer
"Lal Lal Tere Gaal"	Alisha Chinoy
"I Love You"	Alka Yagnik, Vinod Rathod
"Yeh Kaisa Pyar Hai"	Kavita Krishnamurthy, Amit Kumar
"Zara Dekh To"	Amit Kumar
"Mujhe Apni Baahon Mein"	Suresh Wadkar, Sadhana Sargam
