= Shahu Modak =

Indian actor

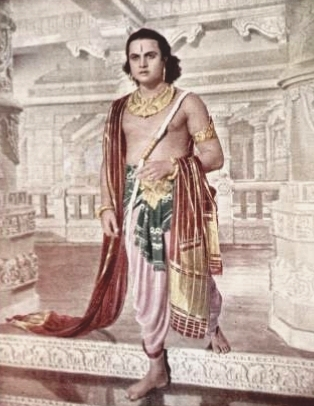
- Modak in Bharat Milap
- Born: Shahu Modak; 25 April 1918; Ahmednagar, India
- Died: 11 May 1993 (aged 75); Pune, India
- Known for: Acting
- Notable work: Shyam Sunder; Awara Shahzada; Aadmi; Sant Dnyaneshwar
- Spouse: Pratibha Modak

Shahu Modak (25 April 1918 – 11 May 1993) was an Indian actor who acted in many Hindi and Marathi movies. Shahu Modak was mostly famous for the mythological characters that he played. He mostly played the roles of Krishna, and Jñāneśvar.

== Personal life ==
Shahu Modak was born into a Marathi Christian family of Ahmednagar on 25 April 1918.

He died on 11 May 1993.

== Filmography ==
Modak acted in numerous films from 1932 to 1986. He played lord Krishna's character in around 30 movies. He also sang two songs for the 1942 movie Bharat Milap.

Year	Title	Role	Notes
1932	Shyam Sundar	Krishna	As a child actor
1932	Awara Shahzada	Doublerole: A Prince, A Pauper	
1933	Bulbule Punjab	Rashid	
1934	Nand Ke Lala	Krishna	
1934	Seva Sadan		
1936	Hind Mahila		
1936	Honhar		
1937	Begunah		
1938	Majha Mulga	Diwakar	
1939	Manoos	Ganpat	
1940	Sant Dnyaneshwar	Jñāneśvar	
1941	Apna Paraya	Vasant	
1942	Bharat Milap	Rajkumar Bharat	
1942	Shobha	Rajendra	
1942	Vasantsena	Charudatta	
1942	Pahili Manglagaur	Sadashiv	
1943	Dulhan		
1943	Ladaai Ke Baad	Kumar	
1943	Kanoon	Ashok	
1943	Mahasati Ansuya	Atri	
1944	Geet	Geet's love interest	
1944	Maharathi Karna	Krishna	
1945	Meghdoot	Meghadūta	
1945	Shri Krishnarjun Yuddha	Krishna	
1946	Dasi Ya Maa	King	
1946	Uttara Abhimanyu	Abhimanyu	
1947	Seedha Raasta	Shahu	
1948	Mandir	Shahu	Special appearance
1949	Maya Bazaar		
1949	Nar Narayan	Nara-Narayana	
1949	Sant Namdev	Namdev	
1949	Veer Ghatotkach	Krishna	
1950	Bhagwan Shri Krishna	Krishna	
1950	Bhishma Pratigya	Shantanu	
1950	Shri Ram Avtar	Rama	
1950	Vatsal Kalyanam		
1951	Jai Mahakali		
1951	Vitthal Rakhumai	Vitthal	
1951	Hi Mazi Lakshmi	Narayan	
1951	Shri Krishna Satyabhama	Krishna	
1952	Bhakta Puran		
1952	Draupadi Vastra Haran		
1954	Amar Kirtan		
1954	Chakradhari		
1954	Durga Pooja		
1955	Mastani	Bajirao I	
1955	Shiv Bhakta	Deena	
1955	Mi Tulas Tuzya Aangani		
1956	Astik	Bhaktraj	
1956	Dashera		
1956	Dwarikadheesh	Krishna	
1956	Harihar Bhakti	Harihar	
1956	Sudarshan Chakra		
1957	Bhakta Dhruva		
1957	Laxmi Pooja		
1957	Mohini	Ugrasen	
1957	Naag Lok		
1957	Narsi Bhagat		
1957	Utavala Narad	Ňárad	
1957	Raja Vikram	Vikram	
1957	Ram Laxman	Rama	
1957	Shesh Naag		
1957	Shyam Ki Jogan		
1958	Gaj Gauri		
1958	Gopichand		
1958	Sudamyache Pohe		
1958	Harishchandra		
1958	Ram Bhakta Vibhishan		
1959	Grihalaxmi		
1960	Bhakta Raj	Yogiraj	
1961	Ram Leela		
1962	Rangalya Ratri Asha	Nana	
1962	Soonbai		
1962	Vithu Maza Lekurwala		
1964	Bhakta Dhruva Kumar		
1964	Sant Dnyaneshwar		
1964	Subhadra Haran		
1964	Goswami Tulsidas	Tulsidas	
1964	Tere Dwar Khada Bhagwan		
1964	Veer Bhimsen		
1965	Mahasati Ansuya		
1965	Sant Tukaram		
1965	Shankar Seeta Ansuya	Shiva	
1968	Balram Shri Krishna	Krishna	
1968	Jyot Jale		
1968	Mata Mahakali		
1969	Talash	Guru Vidyasagar	
1970	Sampoorna Teerth Yatra	Vishnu	
1970	Zala Mahar Pandharinath	Pandharinath	
1972	Narad Leela	Vishnu	
1972	Sant Tulsidas		
1972	Hari Darshan		
1973	Shri Krishna Bhakti	Krishna	
1973	Vishnu Puran	Narad	
1974	Har Har Mahadev		
1975	Daku Aur Bhagwan	Bhagwan	
1975	Mahapawan Teerthyatra		
1975	Shri Satya Narayan Ki Mahapooja		
1976	Jai Bajrang Bali	Maharishi	
1977	Hatyara		
1977	Jai Ambe Maa		
1978	Ashapura Matani Chuandadi		
1979	Gopal Krishna		
1979	Meera		
1979	Ashtavinayak		
1980	Bhalu		
1983	Razia Sultan		
1986	Krishna-Krishna	Guru Sandeepan	

== Manoos Award ==
The Rangat Sangat Pratishthan gives this award since 2001 to a senior artist who has been associated with Shahu Modak as an actor. This award is given at the hands of police commissioner since Shahu Modak played the role of a police in film Manoos. Baby Shakuntala, Asha Kale and Sulochana has been some of the recipients of this award.
