= Bhishma Pratigya (1950 film) =

- Directed by: Vasant Painter
- Produced by: Nargis Art Concern
- Starring: Nargis
- Release date: 1950
- Country: India
- Language: Hindi

Bhishma Pratigya is a 1950 Indian Hindi-language film directed by Vasant Painter. The film was produced by Akhtar Hussain under the banner of Nargis Art Concern. Nargis played the principal character, and was supported by Shahu Modak, Misra, Purnima, Kumar, Mahipal, and Nimbalkar.

A Hindu mythological based on the legend of Bhishma, the film marked the only mythological acting role of Nargis's career. Negative reviews directed at her performance led Nargis to eschew such roles in future.

== Cast ==
- Nargis
- Shahu Modak
- Misra
- Purnima
- Kumar
- Mahipal
- Nimbalkar
