= Waqt Ka Badshah =

- Promotional Poster
- Produced by: Suresh Chowdhary
- Starring: Dharmendra; Vinod Khanna; Raj Babbar; Moon Moon Sen; Navin Nischol; Amjad Khan; Goga Kapoor
- Release date: 3 April 1992
- Country: India
- Language: Hindi

Waqt Ka Badshah (transl. Lord of Time) is a 1992 Indian Hindi-language film directed by Manmohan K. Sabir and produced by Suresh Chowdhary, starring Dharmendra, Vinod Khanna, Raj Babbar, Moon Moon Sen, Navin Nischol, Amjad Khan and Goga Kapoor.

== Cast ==
- Dharmendra as Ashok
- Vinod Khanna as Suraj
- Raj Babbar as Ajay
- Moon Moon Sen as Rita
- Navin Nischol as Mahesh
- Amjad Khan as Pratap
- Imtiaz Khan as Seth Ratanlal
- Goga Kapoor as Randhir

== Soundtrack ==
The music of the film was composed by Amar-Utpal.

=== Tracklist ===
No.	Title	Singer(s)	Length
1.	"Har Dil Jo Pyar Karega"	Kumar Sanu, Jayshree Shivram
