= Aval Kaathirunnu Avanum =

1986 film by P. G. Viswambharan

- Directed by: P. G. Vishwambharan
- Screenplay by: Vijayan Karote
- Produced by: K. P. Kottarakkara
- Starring: Mammootty; Mukesh; Moon Moon Sen; Sukumari
- Cinematography: Manohar
- Edited by: G. Murali
- Music by: Shyam
- Production company: Ganesh Productions
- Distributed by: Ganesh Productions
- Release date: 14 November 1986
- Country: India
- Language: Malayalam

Aval Kaathirunnu Avanum is a 1986 Indian Malayalam-language film, directed by P. G. Vishwambharan and produced by K. P. Kottarakkara. The film stars Mammootty, Mukesh, Moon Moon Sen and Sukumari. The film has musical score by Shyam. The movie was a commercial success.

== Cast ==
- Mammootty as Gopinath
- Mukesh
- Moon Moon Sen
- Sukumari
- Lissy
- Karamana Janardanan Nair
- Mala Aravindan
- Priya
- Sairabhanu
- Sudheesh
- Vanchiyoor Radha
- K. P. Kumar

== Soundtrack ==
The music was composed by Shyam and the lyrics were written by Poovachal Khader.

No.	Song	Singers	Lyrics	Length (m:ss)
1	"Anuraagatheeram"	K. J. Yesudas, K. S. Chithra	Poovachal Khader	
2	"Karineelamekhangal"	K. J. Yesudas	Poovachal Khader	
