= Dhyanimani =

- Directed by: Chandrakant Kulkarni
- Produced by: Aniruddha Deshpande; Medha Manjrekar
- Starring: Mahesh Manjrekar; Ashwini Bhave; Abhijeet Khandkekar; Mrunmayee Deshpande
- Cinematography: Ajith Reddy
- Edited by: Paresh Manjrekar
- Music by: Ajit Parab
- Release date: 10 February 2017
- Country: India
- Language: Marathi

Dhyanimani is an Indian Marathi language film directed by Chandrakant Kulkarni. The film stars Mahesh Manjrekar, Ashwini Bhave, Abhijeet Khandkekar and Mrunmayee Deshpande. The film's music is composed by Ajit Parab. The film was released on 10 February 2017.

== Synopsis ==
Parents-to-be Samir and Aparna take a weekend trip to visit Sada, Shalini, and their son, Mohit. However, their stay becomes eerie when they uncover a dark secret about the seemingly happy family.

== Cast ==
- Mahesh Manjrekar as Sadanand Pathak
- Ashwini Bhave as Shalini Pathak
- Abhijeet Khandkekar as Sameer Karandikar
- Mrunmayee Deshpande as Aparna
- Madhav Abhyankar as Karandikar Sir and Samir's father

== Soundtrack ==
Dhyanimani

Soundtrack album by Ajit Parab
- Released: 2017
- Recorded: 2017
- Genre: Feature film soundtrack
- Length: 8:28
- Language: Marathi

Official audio
- Dhyanimani – Full Album on YouTube

Track listing
No.	Title	Singer(s)	Length
1.	"Ashi Kashi Vedi Maya (Female)"	Madhura Datar	4:14
2.	"Ashi Kashi Vedi Maya (Male)"	Ajit Parab	4:14
Total length:			8:28

== Critical reception ==
Dhyanimani received Positive reviews from critics. Santosh Bhingarde of Sakal wrote "The period in which the play was set may have left it as it was. Yet gripping till the end, this psychological thriller is definitely worth watching". Reshma Raikwar of Loksatta says "'Dhyanimani', which conveys a different dramatic subject through the film, will be a different experience for the audience". Blessy Chettiar of Cinestaan.com wrote "All said and done, it’s good to see a Marathi film in this genre. Watch it for the top-class performances by Bhave and Manjrekar". Ganesh Matkari of Pune Mirror wrote "It’s a wonder how the film manages to deliver an improbable, but marginally acceptable climax, but it does. Considering the rest of the film, it’s a great achievement". A Reviewer of Maharashtra Times wrote "'Dhyanimani' is a movie with deep social content. This movie really comments on what can happen to a childless couple due to traditional social beliefs".
