= Kadachit =

- Theatrical release poster
- Directed by: Chandrakant Kulkarni
- Screenplay by: Girish Joshi
- Story by: Girish Joshi
- Produced by: Usha Bhave co-produced by Ashwini Bhave
- Starring: Ashwini Bhave; Sachin Khedekar; Sadashiv Amrapurkar; Tushar Dalvi
- Cinematography: Rajiv Jain
- Music by: Vishwanath More background music by Amar Mohile
- Release date: 25 October 2008
- Country: India
- Language: Marathi

Kadachit is an Indian Marathi movie released on 25 October 2008. Produced by Ashwini Bhave and directed by Chandrakant Kulkarni. The film stars an ensemble cast with Ashwini Bhave, Sachin Khedekar, Sadashiv Amarapurkar, Tushar Dalvi and Nilu Phule. Ashwini Bhave's Performance won her Second Maharashtra State Film Award Best Actress. The Film Marks Bhave's Comeback in the Film's After 10 years long gap.

== Cast ==
- Ashwini Bhave as Dr. Gayetri
- Sachin Khedekar as Dr. Shekhar
- Sadashiv Amrapurkar as Gayatri's father
- Tushar Dalvi as Dr. Rajesh
- Sulekha Talwalkar as Dr. Smita
