= Maharathi Karna (film) =

- Directed by: Bhalji Pendharkar
- Starring: Prithviraj Kapoor; Durga Khote; Shahu Modak; Swaran Lata
- Production company: Prabhakar Pictures
- Release date: 1944
- Country: India
- Language: Hindi

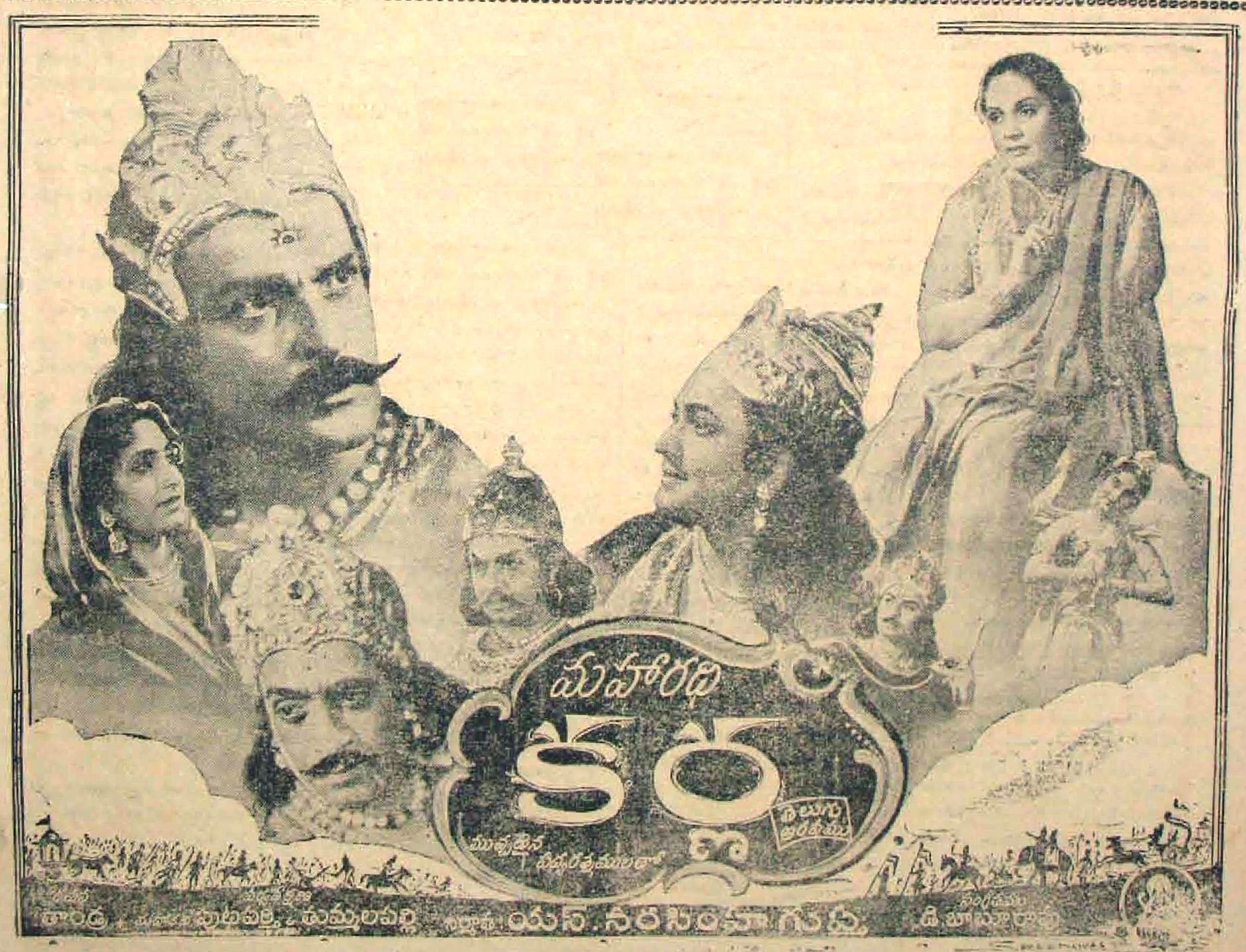
1960 poster of the Maharathi Karna film dubbed into Telugu

Maharathi Karna is a Bollywood mythological film based on the life of Karna directed by Bhalji Pendharkar. It was released in 1944 under the banner of Prabhakar Pictures.

== Cast ==
The cast of the film:

- Prithviraj Kapoor as Karna
- Durga Khote as Kunti
- Shahu Modak as Krishna
- K.N. Singh as Duryodhan
- Swaran Lata as Satybhama
- Kamalakar Torne as Kamalakar Torne
- Leela as Ramani
- Chandrakant as Arjun

== Reception ==
The film was cited as one of Kapoor's notable films by author Ashok Raj. The Indian Express, in their review of the film in 1945, praised the film as an "interesting biography" produced on "an elaborate scale", and commended the performances by Khote and Kapoor.
