= Moon Moon Sen =

Indian actress (born 1954)

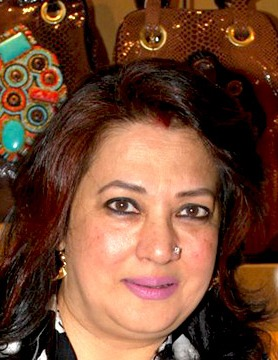
- Sen in 2017

Member of Parliament, Lok Sabha
- In office 16 May 2014 – 23 May 2019
- Preceded by: Basudeb Acharia
- Succeeded by: Subhash Sarkar
- Constituency: Bankura, West Bengal

Personal details
- Born: Srimati Sen; 28 March 1954 (age 72) Calcutta, West Bengal, India (present-day Kolkata)
- Party: All India Trinamool Congress (since 2014)
- Education: Somerville College, Oxford; Jadavpur University
- Occupations: Actress; politician
- Years active: 1982–present
- Spouse: Bharat Dev Varma (m. 1978; died 2024)
- Children: Raima; Riya
- Mother: Suchitra Sen

Moon Moon Sen (also Srimati Dev Varma, Bengali pronunciation: [munmun ʃen]; born Srimati Sen; 28 March 1954), also credited as Moonmoon Sen, is an Indian actress and politician, known for her works in Hindi, Bengali, Malayalam, Kannada, Telugu, Tamil, and Gujarati films. She eventually starred in Bollywood films. She has appeared in 60 films and 40 television series. She has received Andhra Pradesh state Nandi Award for Best Supporting Actress in 1987, for her role in the film Sirivennela. Sen was a Member of Parliament in the 16th Lok Sabha from Bankura constituency from 2014 to 2019.

== Early life ==
Moon Moon Sen was born in Calcutta (present-day Kolkata) to Bengali actress Suchitra Sen and Dibanath Sen. Her father, of Ballygunge Place, was the son of one of the wealthiest businessmen of Kolkata, Adinath Sen. Her great-grandfather Dinanath Sen was the Diwan or a Minister of the Maharaja of Tripura.

She was educated at Loreto Convent, Shillong and at Loreto House, Calcutta. She completed her graduation from Somerville College, Oxford and received her master's degree in Comparative Literature from Jadavpur University, Calcutta.

As a child, Sen learnt drawing from Jamini Roy, one of India's greatest artists. She loves paintings and collecting antiques. In an interview in 2000, she said she taught at Ballygunge Govt High School for a year and then taught graphics at Chitrabani, a school teaching film techniques. She was also active in social work and even thought about adopting a baby, even before she was married. Sen taught English at a well known Boys' school (Ballygunge Govt. High School) in Kolkata before joining films.

== Acting career ==
Moon Moon Sen started her career in films and television after marriage and motherhood. She made her debut in Andar Baahar (1984). Her daring role in that film apparently created a storm of controversy.

She had also starred in the suspense thriller 100 Days (1991) with Madhuri Dixit. After Zakhmi Dil (1994) she did not appear in films until 2003 when she starred in an unsuccessful thriller Kucch To Hai. She acted in Telugu movie Sirivennela (1986) directed by the legendary Telugu director K. Viswanath.

Before and after entering the film industry, she appeared alone (or with her daughters) in some modelling assignments. She notably modelled for soap ads which were quite controversial in the 1980s. Apart from doing some television serials, she also did a couple of Bengali tele-films.

Sen said she would bare all even at 70.

"Age is not important, the attitude is. Sophia is the ultimate glam girl who can manage to look beautiful in such a picture even now. But yes, India too has beautiful women like Rekha and Hema Malini who can carry such a thing out with aplomb. In fact, I wouldn't mind myself if the shoot is done aesthetically and with taste."

Her film My Karma (2004), directed by Korak Day received international awards and recognition for her as a "tough and sweet Indian wife, standing as a rock behind her husband".

She is now doing a few films at a time. She is also apparently writing a cookbook in Bengali.

== Political career ==
She joined Trinamool Congress in March 2014 and won in 2014 Lok Sabha Polls from Bankura constituency, where she defeated CPI(M)'s nine-time MP, Basudeb Acharia. In 2019, she lost the Asansol Lok Sabha constituency election to Babul Supriyo of BJP.

In 2015, Moon Moon Sen in an interview said 'I think we should give him (Modi) a chance. He has done a very good job winning all those votes and we have to give him a chance as a Prime Minister.' Though her party distanced itself from the statement and said that it is her own view and is certainly not the view of the party.

== Personal life ==
Moon Moon Sen married in 1978 to Bharat Dev Varma, a descendant of the erstwhile royal family of Tripura. They have two daughters, Raima and Riya, who also pursued a career in acting. She has stated that her husband was an immense support for her acting career.

Her late mother-in-law, Ila Devi, was the daughter of Indira Raje, the princess of Cooch Behar, and the elder sister of Gayatri Devi, the Maharani of Jaipur.

Deeply religious, in spite of her bohemian screen image, Moon Moon Sen is committed to family life and grieved at her mother Suchitra Sen's death on 17 January 2014 due to a heart attack. She immersed the ashes of her mother ritualistically in the Ganges on Wednesday, 29 January 2014. The prayers was attended by dignitaries, like West Bengal Chief Minister Mamata Banerjee and close friends and family who had missed the funeral, a hurried affair after five hours of death as per the last wishes of the dying actress.

== Awards ==
- Nandi Award for Best Supporting Actress – Sirivennela (1987)
- Kalakendra Screen Award
- Bharat Nirman Award
- Kalakar Awards.

== Filmography ==
Year	Title	Role	Language	Notes
1982	Rajbadhu		Bengali	Debut Film
1983	Rajeswari		Bengali	
1984	Ajantay		Bengali	
1984	Deepar Prem		Bengali	
1984	Pujarini		Bengali	
1984	Andar Baahar	Reema	Hindi	Debut In Hindi
1985	Surkhiyaan - The Headlines		Hindi	
1985	Antarale		Bengali	
1985	Baidurya Rahasya		Bengali	
1986	Amar Kantak		Bengali	
1986	Musafir		Hindi	
1986	Jaal		Hindi	
1986	Mohabbat Ki Kasam	Radha	Hindi	
1986	Sheesha	Manisha Prakash	Hindi	
1986	Aval Kaathirunnu Avanum		Malayalam	
1986	Sirivennela		Telugu	Won Nandi Award
1987	Anjali		Bengali	
1987	Anurodh		Bengali	
1987	Apon Ghorey		Bengali	
1987	Sargam		Bengali	
1987	Pyaar Ki Jeet	Rani Sahiba	Hindi	
1987	Maashuka		Hindi	
1987	Majnu	Shalini	Telugu	
1988	Tumi Kato Sundar		Bengali	
1988	Woh Phir Aayegi		Hindi	
1988	Be Lagaam		Hindi	
1989	Nishi Trishna		Bengali	
1989	Bandhabi		Bengali	
1989	Tere Bina Kya Jeena		Hindi	
1989	Mil Gayee Manzil Mujhe		Hindi	
1989	Ek Din Achanak		Hindi	
1989	Mirza Ki Shaadi		Hindi	
1989	Apna Desh Paraye Log	Journalist Sunita	Hindi	
1989	Jailkhana		Hindi	
1989	Yuga Purusha		Kannada	
1990	Byabodhan		Bengali	
1990	Chakranta		Bengali	
1990	Pathar Ke Insan	Dancer	Hindi	
1990	Jeevan Ek Sanghursh		Hindi	
1990	Bahaar Aane Tak	Renu	Hindi	
1990	Halaat		Hindi	
1990	Andher Gardi		Hindi	
1990	Sabar Tara Vehta Pani		Gujarati	
1991	Lakhi Durga Saraswati		Bengali	
1991	Thikana		Bengali	
1991	Iraada	Geeta Sen	Hindi	
1991	Lekin...	Pammi	Hindi	
1991	Yeh Aag Kab Bujhegi		Hindi	
1991	100 Days	Rama	Hindi	
1991	Vishkanya	Mrs. Sonal Vikram Singh	Hindi	
1992	Hirer Angti		Bengali	
1992	Mahashoy		Bengali	
1992	Krodhi		Bengali	
1992	Lal Pahari		Bengali	
1992	Waqt Ka Badshah		Hindi	
1992	Pyaar Ka Saudagar	Monalisa Sinha (Manorama)	Hindi	
1992	Seeta Salma Suzy		Hindi	
1993	Zakhmi Rooh	Seema/Reema	Hindi	
1993	Vaishakada Dinagalu		Kannada	
1993	Mangalya Bandhana	Rita	Kannada	
1994	Sopan		Bengali	
1994	Gajamukta		Bengali	
1994	Boumoni		Bengali	
1994	Zakhmi Dil	Mala	Hindi	
1994	Abhay		Hindi	
1994	Gentle Man Security		Malayalam	
1995	Protidhwani		Bengali	
1996	Parikrama		Bengali	
1996	Sautela Bhai	Sheena	Hindi	
1996	Durjan		Hindi	
1999	Inteqam Aurat Ka		Hindi	
1999	Sanghat		Assamese	
2000	Ganga Dacait		Hindi	
2000	Bechainee		Hindi	
2001	12B	Sulo	Tamil	
2001	Andheri Raaton Mein		Hindi	
2002	Se Aamar Prem		Bengali	
2003	Nil Nirjane		Bengali	
2003	Agni Balaka		Bengali	
2003	Kucch To Hai	Madam Sexena	Hindi	
2003	Love at Times Square	Sweety's Mother	Hindi	
2003	Taj Mahal: A Monument of Love		Hindi	
2004	My Karma	Mrs. Mullik	English	
2005	It Was Raining That Night		English	
2007	Bow Barracks Forever		English	
2010	Barood : (The Fire) – A Love Story		Hindi	
2010	Notobor Notout		Bengali	
2014	Buno Haansh		Bengali	
2014	Kolkata Calling		Bengali	
2018	Abar Basanta Bilap		Bengali	
2019	Bhobishyoter Bhoot		Bengali	
2020	Shotti Ei To Jibon		Bengali	

== Television ==
Year	Title	Language	Role	Network
1989	Rong Berong	Bengali	Beauty	
1995	Thoda Sa Asman			
	Zaban Sambhal Ke (Note: episodic role)			
	Paliyathachan	Malayalam		
	Rishtey	Hindi		
	Shudhu Tomari Jonyo	Bengali		
