= Shyam Sundar (1932 film) =

1932 film

- Directed by: Bhalji Pendharkar
- Written by: Bhalji Pendharkar
- Produced by: Dadasaheb Torne
- Starring: Shahu Modak; Shanta Apte; Bandopant Sohoni; Baburao Ketkar
- Cinematography: D. G. Gune
- Music by: Baburao Ketkar
- Production company: Saraswati Cinetone
- Release date: 1932
- Running time: 136 min
- Country: India
- Languages: Marathi; Hindi

Shyam Sundar was the Marathi talkie, released in 1932, directed by Bhalji Pendharkar. It is based on the story of Krishna's childhood in the rural setting of Gokul. It was first Indian film to complete a silver-jubilee theatrical run for 27 weeks at West End Cinema in Bombay. It stars Shahu Modak in lead role.

== Plot ==
The film is based on episodes from the childhood of Lord Krishna. It follows Krishna’s playful adventures in Gokul while Kamsa, the tyrant ruler of Mathura, learns of a prophecy that Krishna will cause his downfall. The story alternates between Krishna’s childhood activities and Kamsa’s attempts to prevent the prophecy from being fulfilled.

== Cast ==
- Shahu Modak as Krishna
- Shanta Apte as Radha
- Bandopant Sohoni
- Baburao Ketkar
- Raja Sandow
- Bapurao Apte

== Reception ==
It was a major commercial success. It reportedly ran for 27 weeks at West End Cinema in Bombay, becoming one of the earliest Indian films to achieve a silver-jubilee theatrical run. The film is also remembered for introducing Shahu Modak and Shanta Apte to cinema.
