= Bajirao Mastani (1925 film) =

1925 Indian silent film

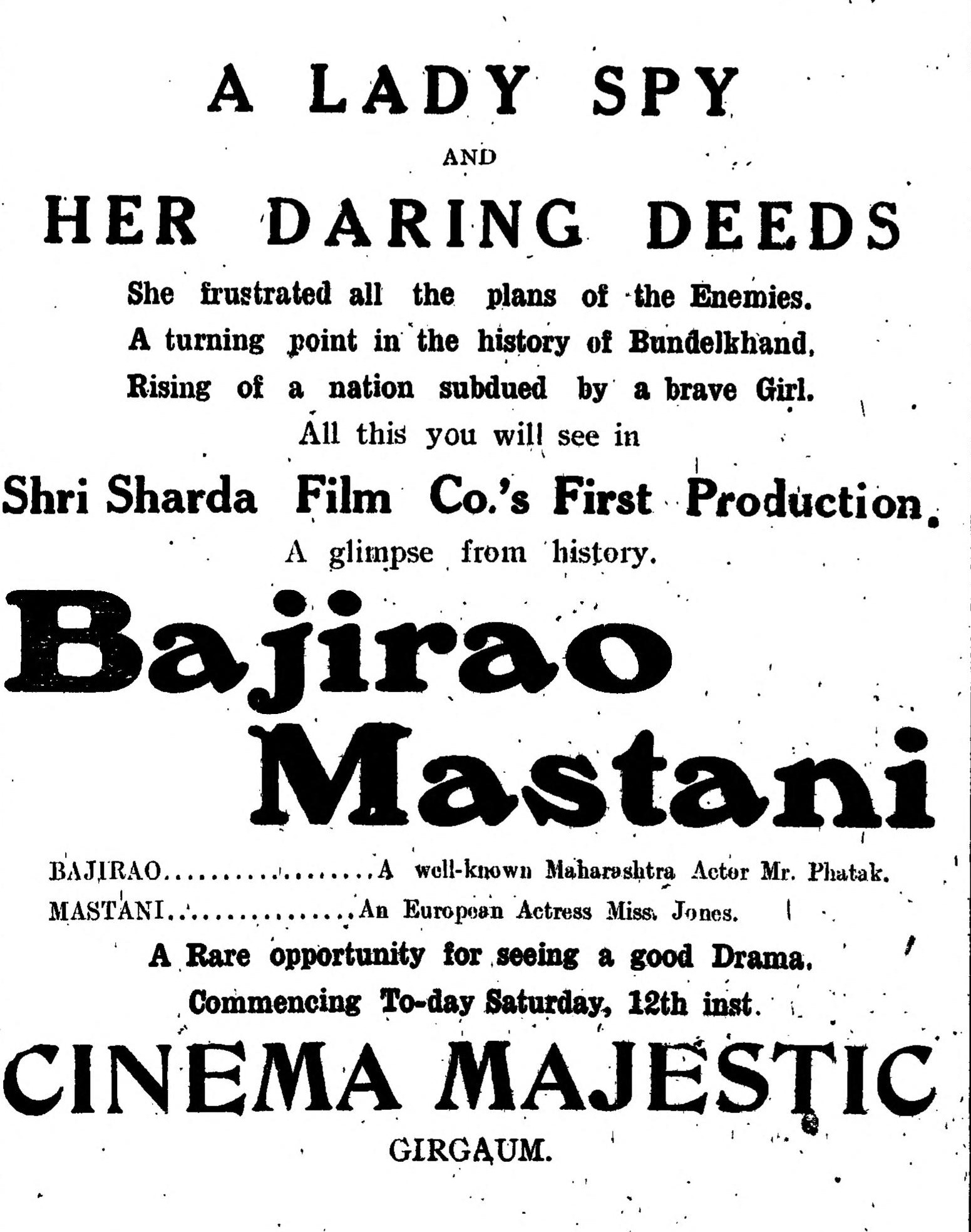
- 1925 Bombay Chronicle advertisement of Bajirao Mastani
- Directed by: Bhalji Pendharkar; Nanubhai Desai
- Starring: Master Vithal; Nanasaheb Phatak; Miss Jones; Sayani; Yakub
- Cinematography: Bhogilal K. M. Dave
- Production company: Sharda Film
- Release date: 1925
- Running time: 7,679 feet
- Country: British India
- Language: Silent

Bajirao Mastani is a 1925 Indian silent historical film co-directed by Bhalji Pendharkar and Nanubhai Desai. Produced by Sharda Film and photographed by Bhogilal K. M. Dave, the film was set during the 18th-century Maratha Peshwa period. It starred Master Vithal, Nanasaheb Phatak, Miss Jones, Sayani and Yakub. The film marked Pendharkar's directorial debut and foreshadowed his later use of Maratha history in his subsequent films.

== Cast ==
- Master Vithal
- Nanasaheb Phatak
- Miss Jones as Mastani
- Sayani
- Yakub

== Production ==
Pendharkar's first screenplay was Prithvi Vallabh (1924), directed by Manilal Joshi. Dissatisfied with the way the screenplay was adapted for the film, Pendharkar sought greater control over his subsequent work. In 1925, when Sharda Film Company invited him to write its next film, he insisted on directing it himself. The resulting Bajirao Mastani gave Pendharkar a start as a director and marked his directorial debut.

The film was based on the legendary love affair between the 18th-century Maratha Peshwa Baji Rao I and Mastani, depicted as his second wife who accompanied him into battle. Miss Jones, a white European actress, played Mastani.

== Female action figure ==
Bajirao Mastani was among the early examples of Indian silent cinema to feature a fighting woman, drawing on the virangana warrior-woman motif that had been prominent in Indian popular theatre and early cinema. Film historian Rosie Thomas notes that Miss Jones, a white European actress, was "probably India's first female action queen", although the surviving evidence does not establish precisely what fighting scenes she performed in the film.

The Bombay Chronicle promoted the film in its 19 December 1925 issue with the claim, "See an [sic] European Actress Playing Mastani... Real Fighting Scenes". According to Thomas, the advertisement indicates that Jones's portrayal as an action-oriented Mastani was used as an attraction in the film's publicity.
