= Swarna Bhoomi =

- Directed by: Bhalji Pendharkar
- Starring: Swaran Lata; Leela Chitnis
- Music by: S. N. Tripathi
- Release date: 1944
- Country: India
- Language: Hindi

Swarna Bhoomi is a Bollywood film. It was released in 1944.

== Cast ==
- Swaran Lata
- Leela Chitnis
- B. Nandrekar
- Chandrakant
- Asha Lata
- Sidha Aptay
