= Alpana Goswami =

Indian film actress

- Born: 19 August 1955 (age 71); West Bengal, India
- Citizenship: Indian
- Occupation: Actress
- Years active: 1976—1992

Alpana Goswami (born 18 August 1955), also known as Alpana Bose Goswami, is an Indian actress who is recognised for her work in Bengali cinema.

Goswami hails from Bandel in Hooghly district. She began her acting career in late 1970s. Her first leading role on silver screen was that in Krishna Sudama (1979). Presently she lives in USA.

== Career ==
Goswami began her acting career after joining in Rammohan Mancha and Bishwarupa. She regularly played in Theatre in Kolkata. Goswami first worked in the film Surya Trishna. She played the lead role in Krishna Sudama in 1979. After releasing the film she became a 1980s celebrated Bengali actress.

== Filmography ==
=== Hindi film ===
Year	Title	Role	Note	Ref.
1982	Dawedaar			
1992	Yeh Raat Phir Na Aayegi	Roopa		

=== Bengali film ===
Year	Title	Role	Note	Ref.
1979	Krishna Sudama			
1979	Arun Barun O Kiranmala	Queen		
1980	Bhagyachakra			
1980	Dui Prithibi		Cameo	
1980	Rajasaheb			
1980	Sandhi			
1981	Khana Baraha			
1981	Swami-Stree			
1982	Khelar Putul		Cameo	
1983	Abhinoy Noy			
1983	Ashleelotar Daye			
1984	Abhishek			
1984	Rashifal			
1984	Samarpita			
1984	Shorgol			
1985	Ajante			
1985	Nishantay			
1985	Baidurya Rahasya			
1985	Sandhya Pradip			
1986	Swarga Sukh			
1986	Uttarlipi			
1987	Dabar Chal			
1987	Bidrohi			
1987	Pratibha			
1987	Pratirodh		Bangladeshi film	
1988	Hushiyar		Bangladeshi film	
1988	Kalankini Nayika			
1989	Nishi Trishna			
1996	Abasheshe			
1996	Rabibar		Cameo	

=== Bhojpuri Film ===
Year	Title	Role	Note	Ref.
1985	Bihari Babu			

== In popular culture ==
Year	Title	Portrayed by	Director	Ref.
1993	Cinemawalla (Note: The Bengali TV series was produced by Teleframe)	Rituparna Sengupta	Dulal Lahiri	
