= Judge Mujrim =

- Theatrical release poster
- Directed by: Jagdish A. Sharma
- Written by: Naeem-Ejaz (dialogues)
- Screenplay by: S. Khan
- Story by: S. Khan
- Produced by: Jayant B. Shah
- Starring: Jeetendra; Sunil Shetty; Ashwini Bhave
- Cinematography: Raj Kumar Khatri
- Edited by: Hussain A. Burmawala
- Music by: Bappi Lahiri
- Production company: Shiv Shakti Productions
- Release date: 1997
- Running time: 138 mins.
- Country: India
- Language: Hindi

Judge Mujrim (transl. Judge Criminal) is a 1997 Hindi-language action film produced by Jayant B. Shah under the Shiv Shakti Productions banner and directed by Jagdish A Sharma. It stars Jeetendra, Sunil Shetty, and Ashwini Bhave. The music was composed by Bappi Lahiri.

== Plot ==
Judge Pratap Sinha (Jeetendra) is a renowned judge who does not pass judgement by sitting down on the judge's chair, but he himself investigates and brings the criminals to their fate. His wife, Sujata (Sujata Mehta), is a famous lawyer. He also has a sister Ashwini, (Ashwini Bhave), a brave police officer.

The city's Mafia, Don D. V. M's (Kiran Kumar) brother Jaggi, commits a gruesome murder of a journalist, Bharti. He is arrested and tried by judge Pratap Sinha, who passes a death sentence on Jaggi.

One day, while on his way to court, Judge Pratap sees Sunil (Sunil Shetty) stabbing another man to death. Acting as an eyewitness, Pratap instructs Ashwini to arrest Sunil—unaware that Sunil is her lover. Shocked but duty-bound, Ashwini carries out the arrest. During the trial, the court sentences Sunil to death. In prison, Sunil meets the notorious criminal Mangal (Mukesh Khanna), an enemy of Judge Pratap. Shortly before Sunil’s execution, D. V. M. reveals to Judge Pratap that Sunil is actually innocent and that he had framed Sunil for the murder. Horrified by the realization that justice has failed, Pratap decides that in order to preserve the true spirit of the law, he must break it. He helps Sunil escape from prison in an attempt to prove his innocence. Now fugitives, Pratap and Sunil find themselves pursued by the entire police force on one side and by D. V. M.'s henchmen on the other. During this time, Mangal joins Pratap’s cause, grateful because the judge once cared for his son while Mangal was imprisoned. In a final act of revenge, D. V. M. kidnaps Ashwini. Pratap, Sunil, and Mangal confront him in a climactic battle. During the fight, Sunil fires his gun at a statue above the courthouse; the falling statue pierces D. V. M., killing him. With the villain defeated, justice is restored, and the film concludes with Sunil and Ashwini finally reunited.

== Cast ==
- Jeetendra as Judge Pratap Sinha
- Sunil Shetty in a single role as: Sunil / Dhaga
- Ashwini Bhave as Inspector Ashwini Sinha
- Sujata Mehta as Mrs. Sujata Sinha
- Johnny Lever in four roles as:
  - Havaldar Amar Lokhande
  - Akbar Charsi
  - Anthony Bhai
  - Janakimma
- Mukesh Khanna as Mangal Singh (Horse Man)
- Kiran Kumar as D.V.M
- Ashok Saraf as PA Natwar
- Surendra Pal as PA Ranjeetey
- Vikas Anand as Prosecutor Mohandas Verma
- Ayesha Jhulka as an item number "Laila O Laila "
- Kunickaa Sadanand as an item number "Parda Parda"
- Archana Puran Singh as an item number "Qatra Shabnam Ka"

== Soundtrack ==
Music was composed by Bappi Lahiri and lyrics were written by Anwar Sagar. The song "Laila O Laila" was inspired on Kaadhalan's song "Mukkala Mukkabla". Film is also remembered for the song " Bin Sajni Ke Jivan Acha Nahi Lagta".

No.	Title	Singer(s)
1	"Bin Sajni Ke Jiwan Acha Nahi Lagta"	Kavita Krishnamurthy, Udit Narayan
2	"Hum Tum Dono Mil Gaye Laila Laila"	Jolly Mukherjee
3	"Qatra Shabnam Ka Shola Banne Laga"	Kavita Krishnamurthy, Kumar Sanu
4	"Parda Parda Ho Parda Parda"	Kavita Krishnamurthy, Amit Kumar
5	"Dil Tod Ke Na Jaa"	Alka Yagnik
6	"Jhoomo Jhoomo"	Sharon Prabhakar
