= Sainik =

1993 film by Sikander Bharti

- DVD Cover
- Directed by: Sikandar Bharti
- Written by: Madan Joshi; Dharam Veer Ram
- Produced by: Jimmy Nirula
- Starring: Akshay Kumar; Ashwini Bhave; Ronit Roy; Farheen; Anupam Kher; Alok Nath
- Cinematography: Kishore Kapadia
- Edited by: Nand Kumar
- Music by: Nadeem Shravan
- Distributed by: Manish Arts
- Release date: 10 September 1993
- Country: India
- Language: Hindi

Sainik (English: Soldier) is a 1993 Indian action drama film directed by Sikandar Bharti. The film stars Akshay Kumar, Ashwini Bhave, Ronit Roy, Farheen, Anupam Kher, and Alok Nath in pivotal roles.

== Plot ==
Army officer Suraj Dutt, is the son of Yashpal Dutt. Suraj goes to meet his sister Minni at a women's college before he falls in love with Alka. They soon get married, but Suraj is called for a year-long mission.

While Suraj is away a message arrives that he has been killed. Minni, Alka, and Yashpal each learn about this but don't tell each other as they feel the others will die upon hearing this.

Meanwhile, Minni is about to wed Vijay, but on the day of her wedding, she is kidnapped. The movie ends with the reappearance of Suraj, who was alive all this time and who saves Minni, as everybody is reunited.

== Cast ==
- Akshay Kumar as Lieutenant Suraj Dutt
- Ashwini Bhave as Alka Dutt
- Pradeep Kumar as Sonu Oberoi
- Ronit Roy as Vijay Ghai
- Farheen as Minni Dutt
- Anupam Kher as Retired Colonel Yashpal Dutt
- Aloknath as Bihari
- Ranjeet as Gajraj Chaudhary
- Laxmikant Berde as Guddu
- Guddi Maruti as Guddi
- Satish Shah as Alka's Father

== Soundtrack ==
Nadeem-Shravan composed the soundtrack of the film, with lyrics written by Sameer Anjaan.

#	Song	Singer
1	"Jaam Woh Hai Jo Bhar Ke"	Kumar Sanu
2	"Meri Wafayen Yaad Karoge"	Kumar Sanu, Asha Bhosle
3	"Kitni Hasrat Hai Humein"	Kumar Sanu, Sadhana Sargam
4	"Babul Ka Ghar Chod Ke"	Kumar Sanu, Alka Yagnik
5	"Humko Hua Hai Pyar"	Vinod Rathod, Alka Yagnik
6	"Hai Meri Saanson Mein Mere Piya"	Suhasini

== Reception ==
India Today wrote, "It's patriotism, Hindi movie style. The army scenes are awful. The music is good. On the whole, just short of bearable."
