= Nishi Trishna =

1989 Bengali film

- Directed by: Parimal Bhattacharya
- Starring: Moon Moon Sen; Prosenjit Chatterjee
- Release date: 1989
- Country: India
- Language: Bengali

Nishi Trishna (English: Nocturnal Thirst) is a 1989 Bengali-language supernatural action-horror film directed by Parimal Bhattacharya under the banner of S. B. Films Private Limited. It was the first vampire film in Bengali. The film stars Prasenjit Chatterjee, Shekhar Chatterjee and Moon Moon Sen.

== Plot ==
Few friends plan to visit the Garchampa Palace in a village. The palace had a bad reputation for demonic blood sucking spirit beings that were terrorising the area. They ultimately solve the mystery, and kill the vampire and his mentor.

== Cast ==
- Moon Moon Sen in duel roles as Shimli/Komli
- Prasenjit Chatterjee as Paul
- Sumanta Roy as Anjan
- Alpana Goswami
- Sumitra Mukherjee
- Shekhar Chatterjee
- Shailen Mukherjee
- Jeeban Guha
- Sumanta Mukherjee
- Manas Mukherjee
- Barnali Mitra
