= The Raikar Case =

2020 Indian Hindi-language web-series

- Official poster
- Genre: Crime; Mystery; Thriller
- Written by: Karmanya Ahuja
- Directed by: Aditya Sarpotdar
- Starring: Atul Kulkarni; Ashwini Bhave; Kunal Karan Kapoor; Parul Gulati; Neil Bhoopalam
- Country of origin: India
- Original language: Hindi
- No. of seasons: 1
- No. of episodes: 7

Production
- Producers: Aakansha Bisht; Mautik Tolia; Persis Siganporia
- Production locations: Goa, India
- Cinematography: Manoj Soni
- Editor: Praveen Kathikuloth
- Camera setup: Multi-camera
- Running time: 34-45 minutes
- Production company: Bodhi Tree Multimedia Limited

Original release
- Network: Voot
- Release: 9 April 2020

The Raikar Case is a Hindi-language murder-mystery web series directed by Aditya Sarpotdar and produced by Sukesh Motwani, Mautik Tolia and Persis Siganporia. It stars Atul Kulkarni, Ashwini Bhave, Parul Gulati and Neil Bhoopalam.

== Cast ==
- Atul Kulkarni as Yashwant Naik Raikar
- Ashwini Bhave as Sakshi Naik Raikar
- Ajay Purkar as Rajshekahar Apte
- Honey Kamboj as Tarun Naik Raikar
- Kunal Karan Kapoor as Mohit Naik Raikar
- Mohit Chauhan as Vinayak Naik Raikar
- Neil Bhoopalam as SP John Pereira
- Parul Gulati as Etasha Naik Raikar
- Manava Arun Naik as Anandi Apte
- Vaishnavi Kadam as Manika Apte
- Lalit Prabhakar as Eklavya
- Prakash Ramchandani as Jagdish Apte
- Reena Wadhwa as Lily D'Silva Naik Raikar
- Saloni Khanna as Mini, Eklavya's Fiancé

== Episodes ==
- Episode 1- Suicide Or Murder ??
- Episode 2- Hunt For The Killer.
- Episode 3- The Evidence Doesn't Lie.
- Episode 4- Hidden Secret, Buried Truth
- Episode 5- Raikar's Vs Raikar's
- Episode 6- Truth Over Family?
- Episode 7- Whodunnit?

== Release ==
The series was released on 9 April 2020 and it is now available on the popular OTT platform Voot.

== Reception ==
Reviewing for The Indian Express Arushi Jain wrote "The main selling point of The Raikar Case is its able cast. Atul Kulkarni, who plays the family patriarch, is as good as he has always been. He plays both the suspect of a murder and a victim of politics convincingly. Ashvini Bhave's experience shows in her performance as she plays Kulkarni's wife Sakshi."

The Times of India wrote "Each episode ends on a cliffhanger, making you want to jump right over to the next one. Though, after a point, the drama does become predictable and the pace too tends to slow down."

Ruchi Kaushal of Hindustan Times praised star cast performances and wrote "Atul is exemplary as he exudes power on one hand but appears vulnerable and fragile in circumstances not in his favour. Ashwini Bhave makes a wonderful comeback in a meaty role. Neil and Parul Gulati emerge as the central leads and do justice to the task at hand."

A critic from Pinkvilla rated the series 3 stars out of 5 and wrote "The Raikar Case couldn't have come through without good performances."

Scroll.in reviewed and wrote "Writers Bijesh Jayarajan, Karmanya Ahuja and Anitha Nair use the Rashomon technique to present varying possibilities. Repeated information (the dialogue is by Chinmay Mandlekar) and over-use of the structure waste precious minutes."

The New Indian Express wrote "It would have made for a good feature film too. But despite the makers choosing the web-series format, the all-important character arcs of these family members feel underdeveloped."
