= Mil Gayee Manzil Mujhe =

- VCD cover
- Directed by: Moeen Amjad
- Produced by: Shantilal J.Sopariwala
- Starring: Mithun Chakraborty; Moon Moon Sen; Shakti Kapoor; Amrish Puri
- Music by: R. D. Burman
- Release date: 13 January 1989
- Running time: 135 minutes
- Country: India
- Language: Hindi

Mil Gayee Manzil Mujhe is a 1989 Indian Hindi-language film directed by Moeen Amjad, starring Mithun Chakraborty, Moon Moon Sen, Shakti Kapoor and Amrish Puri.

== Plot ==
Vijay is an upright and laborious young man who works as a stunt man for films. Yearning for love drove him towards Renu, but before his yearning fructifies Renu goes out his life with a millionaire. Dinesh Singh his bruised heart find solace in the arms of Kamini but she comes out to be perfidious and avaricious for money. It makes Vijay realize the importance of money and in order to earn money, he joins the gang Shamsher Chattopadhyay, an underworld don, having come to know that Kamini has married a rich diamond merchant of Kathmandu, he goes their presenting himself as a wealthy businessman of Uganda, fond of collecting rare gems and diamonds, to take revenge from her. Vijay traps the avaricious Kamini in his clutches, but before he could avenge his insult and humiliation, Renu blocks his maneuver, Renu is the sister of Dinesh. This information banishes all his misconceptions regarding Renu from his heart and he again starts trying to win her love. Dinesh throws a party to announce the betrothal of Vijay's sister Asha with Ravi. Vijay takes away Asha from the party when he discovers that Asha has fallen with Ravi, another gang leader of the underworld. On reaching his suite in the hotel, where he is staying, he is shocked to find Shamsher Chattopadhyay and his henchmen waiting for him. Asha is very much heart to know that her brother works for Shamsher and he has amassed wealth through illegal means. Vijay promises Asha that he will toil hard even starve, to earn through honest means and leave the gang of Shamsher forever, but Shamsher exterminates those who dare to leave his gang.

== Cast ==
- Mithun Chakraborty as Vijay Malhotra
- Moon Moon Sen as Renu
- Shakti Kapoor as Inspector Ravi
- Shobha as Asha Malhotra
- Urmila Bhatt as Vijay and Asha's Mother
- Girish Karnad as Dinesh
- Kalpana Iyer as Kamini
- Amrish Puri as Shamsher Chattopadhyay

== Soundtrack ==
Song	Singer
"Mere Achhe Piya"	Lata Mangeshkar
"Ja Main Tose Rooth Gayi"	Asha Bhosle
"Janam Kahin Na Jaya Karo"	Asha Bhosle
"Yeh Zindagi Ka Fasana Hai Kya"	Asha Bhosle, Kishore Kumar
"Tum Jo Mile To Phool Khile"	Asha Bhosle, Kishore Kumar
"Ek Taraf Tum Ek Taraf Hum, Tum Kuch Bhi Ho Hum Bhi Nahin Kam"	Asha Bhosle, Kishore Kumar, Shailendra Singh
