= Bandhan (1998 film) =

- DVD cover
- Directed by: K. Murali Mohana Rao; Rajesh Malik
- Written by: Anwar Khan (dialogues)
- Story by: Manoj Kumar
- Based on: Pandithurai (Tamil)
- Produced by: Narendra Bajaj
- Starring: Salman Khan; Rambha
- Cinematography: Rajan Kinagi
- Edited by: J. Narasimha Rao
- Music by: Songs: Anand Raj Anand; Himesh Reshammiya; Background Score: Surinder Sodhi
- Production company: Siddhivinayak Creations
- Distributed by: Eros International
- Release date: 2 October 1998
- Running time: 154 minutes
- Country: India
- Language: Hindi
- Budget: ₹5.75 crore
- Box office: ₹21.45 crore

Bandhan (transl. Bond) is a 1998 Indian Hindi-language romantic drama action film directed by K. Murali Mohana Rao starring Jackie Shroff, Salman Khan, Rambha and Ashwini Bhave. It is a remake of the Tamil film Pandithurai.

== Plot ==
Thakur Suraj Pratap sees a young woman performing pooja at a temple, and instantly falls in love with her. This is Pooja, who belongs to a poor family, consisting of her dad, Ramlal, her mom and a brother named Raju. Thakur sends an emissary to Ramlal, who is delighted to give his daughter to Thakur in marriage, and the wedding is celebrated with due ceremony. Pooja is very fond of Raju and takes him along with her to her husband's house. This is the only "gift" that Pooja's impoverished parents are able to give their daughter at the wedding, and it is also beneficial for the young boy to grow up in a more affluent household. At the Thakur's palatial home, Pooja is greeted by Jyoti, Thakur's sister.

Years pass. Unfortunately, Pooja has been unable to bear children because of bilateral tubal block and failed IVF. Raju, now grown up, is intensely attached and loyal to Thakur, his brother-in-law. He and Thakur's sister Jyoti are in love. One day, Thakur meets Vaishali, a courtesan who sings and dances for a living. Vaishali has no relatives except one brother, an unscrupulous card-sharp named Gajendra who lives off his sister's earnings. Vaishali seduces the Thakur and becomes his mistress. Her brother, posing as a respectable man, demands that Thakur marry Vaishali and make the relationship public. Thakur is reluctant. On the one hand, he possibly hopes that Vaishali will make him a father. On the other hand, he is attached to his dutiful wife and loving brother-in-law. Gajendra and his friends hatch a plot to kill two birds with one stone: to induce Thakur to marry Vaishali, and at the same time, break the strong relationship between Thakur and Raju. The conspirators make a fool of Raju, as a result of which he causes the police to raid Gajendra's house, on the allegation that the house is being used as a brothel. During the police raid, Raju is horrified to find that the 'customer' found in Vaishali's company is none other than his brother-in-law. Thakur is also angered to find that the person who has caused him this infamy and police entanglement is none other than Raju. In order to avoid legal proceedings, Thakur tells the police that he is present in the house in order to discuss the possibility of marrying Vaishali, the reason being that his wife has remained childless. Raju falls at Thakur's feet, begs forgiveness, and pleads with him not to take a second wife. His pleas fall on deaf ears; Thakur duly marries Vaishali and takes her home. Raju tells his parents of what has happened, of how Pooja now has a co-wife. They come to Thakur's mansion and create a scene. Annoyed at the commotion, Thakur tells Pooja to make her choice once and for all: she can either accept Vaishali as her co-wife and remain in his household with the respectability of being the senior wife, or depart with her parents for good. Pooja chooses to remain with her husband and co-wife, for as she says, that is her wifely duty; her husband's house is the only suitable residence for a married woman. Raju, who has lived in Thakur's household for many years, now goes away with his parents.

These events cause a great rift between the two families, because of which the two lovers (Raju and Jyoti) are separated. Vaishali is ensconced in the Thakur's mansion, and her brother becomes Thakur's confidant. He now wants to marry Thakur's sister, Jyoti, so that he and his sister Vaishali will totally control the vast wealth of the Thakur family. A naïve Thakur is taken in by his new brother-in-law's seeming decency, and it is arranged that Gajendra will marry Jyoti. However, Jyoti bravely refuses to marry anyone except Raju. She is supported by Pooja, who makes the point that it would be wrong and even sinful for Jyoti to marry one man while being in love with another; chasteness of the mind is as important as chasteness of the body.

Thakur decides to delay the matter for the time being. Gajendra is aghast at this and makes a plan to abduct Jyoti so that afterward she will have no choice but to marry him. He reveals his plan to his sister and asks her to help him, but Vaishali has undergone a personality change after her marriage. She now wants to be a respectable woman and is extremely grateful to Thakur for having given her the chance to reform. She berates and opposes her brother, and makes it clear that she will inform her husband. Gajendra feels betrayed by his sister and sees that she has gained so much (Thakur's wealth, his social standing and the respectability of wifehood), whereas he, Gajendra, has, in fact, lost his only source of income, which was the money from his sister's song-and-dance performances. In a fit of rage, he plunges a knife into Vaishali's stomach and kills her. He then makes an effort to frame Thakur for Vaishali's murder. There are some further (rather incomprehensible) shenanigans until, in the climax, Thakur realizes that he has been used and manipulated, and also that Raju (the supporting hero of the film) is the epitome of goodness, loyalty, affection, and every noble human quality. At Thakur's behest, Raju dispatches the villains, rescues Jyoti and protects Thakur's honour, gamely taking a bullet in the shoulder during the Big Fight. He survives to dance another song, and Thakur, now reconciled with his beloved and loyal Raju, gives Jyoti in marriage to him. The two couples live happily ever after, with great love existing both within each couple and between the two couples.

== Cast ==
- Jackie Shroff as Thakur Suraj Pratap (Jyoti's brother)
- Salman Khan as Raju (Pooja's brother) and Jyoti's love interest
- Rambha as Jyoti (Thakur Suraj Pratap's sister) and Raju's love interest
- Ashwini Bhave as Pooja (Raju's sister) and Thakur Suraj Pratap's wife
- Himani Shivpuri as Raju and Pooja's mother
- Aanjjan Srivastav as Raju and Pooja's father
- Shakti Kapoor as Billu
- Ashok Saraf as Chillu
- Mukesh Rishi as Gajendra
- Shweta Menon as Vaishali (Gajendra's sister)
- Aasif Sheikh as Police Inspector
- Sharad Sankla as Police Constable
- Prashant Vishnoi
- Raju Kiran

== Soundtrack ==
Bandhan

Soundtrack album by Himesh Reshammiya Anand Raaj Anand
- Released: 8 August 1998 (Digital Release); 2 October 1998 (Film)
- Recorded: 1996
- Venue: Mumbai
- Genre: Feature film soundtrack

No.	Title	Lyrics	Music	Singer(s)	Length
1.	"Tere Naina Mere Naino Ki"	Arun Bhairav	Anand Raaj Anand	Kavita Krishnamurthy, Udit Narayan	05:43
2.	"Balle Balle"	Sudhakar Sharma	Himesh Reshammiya	Abhijeet Bhattacharya, Alka Yagnik, Sapna Awasthi	05:10
3.	"Bandhan ( Title Song)"	Dev Kohli	Anand Raaj Anand	Kumar Sanu	05:22
4.	"Chhora Phisal Gaya"	Sudhakar Sharma	Himesh Reshammiya	Alka Yagnik, Udit Narayan	05:16
5.	"Tere Dum Se Hai Mera Dum"	Sudhakar Sharma	Himesh Reshammiya	Alka Yagnik, Kumar Sanu	05:36
6.	"Bandhan" (Sad version)	Rajesh Malik	Anand Raaj Anand	Kumar Sanu	03:47
7.	"Main Deewani Main Mastani"	Dev Kohli	Anand Raaj Anand	Shweta Shetty	04:29
