= Rangena Halliyage Rangada Rangegowda =

Indian romantic drama film

- VCD cover
- Directed by: V. Umakanth
- Written by: Krishna Nadig (dialogue)
- Screenplay by: V Umakanth
- Story by: V Umakanth
- Produced by: Kantha Ramakrishna
- Starring: Ambareesh; Ramesh Aravind; Ashwini Bhave; Bhavyashree Rai
- Cinematography: P Rajan
- Edited by: S Prasad
- Music by: V. Manohar
- Production company: Sri Devamma Productions
- Release date: 21 January 1997
- Country: India
- Language: Kannada

Rangena Halliyage Rangada Rangegowda is a 1997 Indian Kannada-language romantic drama film directed by V Umakanth and starring Ambareesh, Ramesh Aravind, Ashwini Bhave and Bhavyashree Rai.

== Plot ==
Ranganath stays in Kasthuri's village home under the false identity of Rangegowda. He falls in love with her and marries her, and they move out to another house. His younger brother, Ramesh, comes to stay with him and Kasthuri. He initially falls for her and is enraged when he finds out she is pregnant but later falls for another girl Padma. Kasthuri's aunt, who despises Rangegowda for lying about his identity, comes to the house and attempts to set up an engagement between Ramesh and Kasthuri much to her dismay. An enraged Ramesh leaves their house, falls due to chest pain, gets admitted to the hospital and dies. Kasthuri, who was facing pregnancy problems, dies after childbirth. Rangegowda and Padma end up taking care of her baby.

== Cast ==
- Ambareesh as Rangegowda / Ranganath
- Ramesh Aravind as Ramesh
- Ashwini Bhave as Kasthuri
- Bhavyashree Rai as Padma
- Sathyapriya as Bangaram, Kasthuri's aunt
- Krishnegowda
- V. Manohar
- Agro Chikkanna
- BEML Somanna
- Aaganthuka Nagaraj

== Soundtrack ==
The music was composed by V. Manohar.

Rangena Halliyage Rangada Rangegowda

Soundtrack album by V. Manohar
- Released: 1997
- Genre: Feature film soundtrack
- Length: 24:16
- Language: Kannada
- Label: T-Series Kannada
- Producer: V. Manohar

V. Manohar chronology
Nodu Baa Nammoora (1997)	Rangena Halliyage Rangada Rangegowda (1997)	Chikka (1997)
External audio
- Rangena Halliyage Rangada Rangegowda – Jukebox on YouTube

All lyrics are written by V. Manohar.

Track listing
No.	Title	Singer(s)	Length
1.	"Ele Giniye"	K. S. Chithra	4:08
2.	"Laka Laka"	L. N. Shastri	3:32
3.	"Jum Jumkala"	S. P. Balasubrahmanyam, Sujatha Krishnan	4:31
4.	"Pattanakke Banda"	Ramesh Chandra, Mangala Anjan	3:49
5.	"Jaaliya Neralinda"	S. P. Balasubrahmanyam	4:22
6.	"Poguve Yethake Ramani"	V. Manohar, Rajesh Krishnan, L. N. Shastri, K. S. Chithra	3:52
Total length:			24:16

== In popular culture ==
Ramesh Aravind shared a still showing his elderly woman getup from the film on Twitter in 2017 and on Instagram in 2018. The still went viral after a couple years, and several news outlets reported that the still was from a 1997 Kannada film without mentioning its name.
