= Zakhmi Dil (1994 film) =

1994 film by Raj Subramaniam

- Directed by: Raju Subramaniam
- Produced by: Damodaran S. Mudaliar
- Starring: Akshay Kumar; Ashwini Bhave; Ravi Kishan
- Music by: Rishi Raj
- Release date: 25 November 1994
- Country: India
- Language: Hindi
- Budget: ₹85 lakh
- Box office: ₹1.36 crore

Zakhmi Dil is a 1994 Indian Hindi action film directed by Raju Subramaniam. It stars Akshay Kumar, Ravi Kishan and Ashwini Bhave in lead roles.

== Plot ==
Jaidev (Akshay Kumar) and Gayatri (Ashwini Bhawe) are childhood lovers who are separated due to some misunderstanding. Jaidev becomes a successful music director in Mumbai. Gayatri goes to Mumbai in search of Jaidev. There she meets Mala, who is the lead singer of Jaidev's music company. She addresses herself as Jaidev's wife (but she is not) in front of Gayatri, unknown to Jaidev. Gayatri, heartbroken, leaves from there with her daughter. Jaidev fires Mala due to her careless attitude towards music. Jaidev searches for a new voice for his company. There he meets Guddi (Vandana), who is a fabulous singer. Jaidev launches Guddi and she becomes a successful singer. Meanwhile, Jaidev falls in love with Guddi. Guddi, unaware of the fact, meets Abhimanyu (Ravi Kishan) in Darjeeling and falls in love with him. They come back to meet Jaidev and Jaidev decides to get them married. Abhimanyu is killed by Jaidev's rivals, who want to kill Vandana to close Jaidev's music company. Vandana still in depression after Abhimanyu's death, realises Jaidev's love for her and plans to get married. She bumps into Gayatri. Gayatri's misunderstandings are cleared when she knows the truth. She decided to tell that to Jaidev, but Vandana tries to stop her. During the wedding, some goons attack Vandana and she dies, reuniting Jaidev and Gayatri.

== Cast ==
- Akshay Kumar as Jaidev Anand
- Ashwini Bhave as Gayatri
- Anjali Raj as Vandana
- Ravi Kishan as Abhimanyu
- Aruna Irani as Kalpini
- Moon Moon Sen as Mala
- Raza Murad as D.K.
- Bindu as Mrs. Braganza
- Shashi Kiran as Parasmal Kriplani

== Soundtrack ==
#	Title	Singer(s)
1	"Mujhko Bhi Sang Le Chal"	Sadhana Sargam
2	"Payaliya Geet Sunayegi"	Udit Narayan, Kavita Krishnamurti
3	"Ae Meri Zindagi"	Kumar Sanu, Sadhana Sargam
4	"Khushiyon Ka Mausam"	Kumar Sanu
5	"Sakhi Mujhe Jaana Hai"	Ila Arun, Jayshree
6	"Phool Jahan Khiltey Hain"	Kumar Sanu, Sadhana Sargam
7	"Choodi Khankaoun"	Kavita Krishnamurti
