= Ekka Raja Rani =

1994 film by Afzal Ahmed Khan

Ekka Raja Rani एक राजा रानी
- Promotional Poster
- Directed by: Afzal Ahmed Khan
- Produced by: Xavier Marquis
- Starring: Vinod Khanna; Govinda; Paresh Rawal
- Music by: Nadeem-Shravan
- Distributed by: Mark Films
- Release date: 24 June 1994
- Country: India
- Language: Hindi

Ekka Raja Rani is a 1994 Bollywood action drama film directed by Afzal Ahmed Khan, produced by Xavier Marquis starring Vinod Khanna and Govinda.

== Plot ==
Vishal Kapoor alias V.K (Vinod Khanna) is an underworld Don of Mumbai. Asha (Ashwini Bhave) is in love with V.K. However, she gets no response from V.K as he does not believe in love.

V.K has his beloved friend Pasha (Anil Dhawan) who sacrifices his life to save V.K. Before death, Pasha took an oath from V.K that he will take care of his brother Sagar (Govinda).

Barkha (Ayesha Jhulka) is a good dancer. However, she is being kicked out by her guru on account of jealousy. One day, the enemies of V.K plant a time bomb under his car. Barkha is watching all this activity. When V.K is about to sit in the car. Barkha drags V.K away from the car. Hence saving his life. V.K appreciates what Barkha has done for him and offers her to remain in his house as a guest. Homeless, Barkha has no choice but to accept the offer.

At V.K's house, Barkha faces some problems with Sagar initially but falls in love with him later. Meanwhile, not knowing Barkha and Sagar are in love, V.K also starts to have feelings for Barkha. In her love, he leaves drinking.

V.K arranges a party to announce his engagement with Barkha. When he proposes to her, she turns him down, and tells him that she loves Sagar. Enraged, Vicky starts to drink again. Sagar and Barkha leave the house.

Nageshwar Rao (Paresh Rawal) being an enemy of V.K takes advantage of the situation and started to create misunderstandings between V.K and Sagar. Initially, he was successful in doing so. Later on, after the interference of Dr. Asha, the real bone of contention was revealed to V.K and Sagar. Both kill Nageshwar. Sagar marries Barkha and V.K marries Asha and all live happily.

== Cast ==
- Vinod Khanna as Vishal 'Vicky' Kapoor
- Govinda as Sagar
- Ayesha Jhulka as Barkha
- Ashwini Bhave as Asha
- Paresh Rawal as Nageshwar Rao
- Tinnu Anand as Dhalal
- Anil Dhawan as Pasha
- Bharat Kapoor as Police Commissioner
- Johnny Lever as Guruji (Dancemaster)
- Mushtaq Khan as Dharma, Vicky's Assistant
- Tej Sapru as Kali
- Sudhir Dalvi as Police Constable, Asha's Father
- Rajendra Nath as John
- Ishrat Ali as Mr. Dhanraj
- Sudhir as DSP Gaekwad
- Shiva Rindani as Rajeshswar Rao, elder brother of Nageshwar
- Vikas Anand as Builder

== Soundtrack ==
Soundtrack composed by the renowned duo Nadeem-Shravan, with lyrics penned by Sameer. The music album, released by Tips Industries Ltd, includes a mix of romantic and upbeat tracks, showcasing the era's signature melodic style.

#	Title	Singer(s)
1	"Ishq Karoge To Dard Milega"	Udit Narayan, Kumar Sanu & Sarika Kapoor
2	"Yeh Neeli Peeli Chudiyaan"	Udit Narayan, Alka Yagnik
3	"Pyar Karo To Aise"	Kumar Sanu
4	"Dil Ko Zara Sa Aaram Denge" (Duet)	Kumar Sanu, Alka Yagnik
5	"Dil Ko Zara Sa"	Babul Supriyo
6	"Mere Savre Savaria"	Bali Brahmbhatt, Sapna Awasthi
7	"Dil Milne Ko Tarasta Hai"	Vinod Rathod, Alka Yagnik
8	"Tadpun Ya Pyar Karun"	Alka Yagnik
