= Kayda Kanoon =

1993 film by Pradeep Mani

- DVD cover
- Directed by: Pradeep Mani
- Produced by: Suresh Sharma
- Starring: Akshay Kumar; Ashwini Bhave; Sudesh Berry; Tinnu Anand; Paresh Rawal; Aruna Irani; Ajit Vachani; Kader Khan
- Music by: Anand–Milind
- Release date: 11 June 1993
- Running time: 150 minutes
- Language: Hindi

Kayda Kanoon (transl. Rules and Regulations) is a 1993 Indian action film directed by Pradeep Mani and produced by Suresh Sharma. It stars Akshay Kumar, Ashwini Bhave, Sudesh Berry, Paresh Rawal and Kader Khan.

== Overview ==
D.D.,K.K. and Mirza take law into their hands to fight against corrupted officers and politicians who wronged them. Meanwhile, Sinha, a former freedom fighter, firmly believes in law and warns them not to take law in their hands and use lawful means for their purpose. Eventually realising how pitiful law is and how corrupted the system is.

== Cast ==
- Akshay Kumar as Inspector Dawood Durrani (D.D.)
- Ashwini Bhave as Shehnaz Lucknowi / Maria D'Souza
- Sudesh Berry as Inspector Kishan Kashyap (K.K.)
- Tinu Anand as Ranganathan
- Paresh Rawal as MP Kalika Prasad
- Anupam Kher as Sinha
- Aruna Irani as MLA Vimla Sinha
- Kader Khan as Mirza Lucknowi
- Ajit Vachani as Amrit Sinha
- Anant Mahadevan as Kashyap
- Arun Bali
- Pankaj Berry
- Pradeep Rawat as Inspector Deshmukh
- Shikha Swaroop as Kavita Sinha

== Soundtrack ==
#	Title	Singer(s)
1	"Aankhon Mein Nahin Dil Mein"	Kumar Sanu, Sadhana Sargam
2	"Aap Aaye"	Vinod Rathod, Sapna Mukherjee
3	"Dono Aalam Ka Sultan Hai"	Sabri Brothers
4	"Ek Aur Do Idhar Dekho"	Kavita Krishnamurthy
5	"Govinda Aaya Dhoom Machaane"	Udit Narayan
6	"Parvaton Pe Chhaayee Ghataayen"	Suresh Wadkar, Sadhana Sargam
7	"Pawan Basanti Behne Lagi"	Suresh Wadkar, Kavita Krishnamurthy
8	"Zulfen Bikhraaye Baahon Mein"	Suresh Wadkar, Kavita Krishnamurthy
9	"Tadpane Do Tadpane Do"	Sapna Mukherjee
