= Pandithurai =

- Theatrical release poster
- Directed by: Manoj Kumar
- Written by: Manoj Kumar
- Produced by: K. Balu
- Starring: Prabhu; Khushbu
- Cinematography: Rajarajan
- Edited by: P. Mohanraj
- Music by: Ilaiyaraaja
- Production company: K. B. Films
- Release date: 15 January 1992
- Running time: 150 minutes
- Country: India
- Language: Tamil

Pandithurai is a 1992 Indian Tamil-language film directed by Manoj Kumar. The film stars Prabhu and Khushbu. It was released on 15 January 1992, and completed a 100-day run. The film was remade in Telugu as Bava Bavamaridi (1993), in Hindi as Bandhan (1998), in Kannada as Baava Baamaida (2001) and in Bangladeshi Bengali as Bhalobashar Shotru (2005).

== Plot ==
Pandithurai left his mother and his father to live with his newlywed sister and his rich brother-in-law, Malaisamy.

A few years later, Pandithurai becomes an uneducated, angry youth, but respects Malaisamy more than anything. Malaisamy's daughter, Muthulakshmi, who studied in the city, comes back to her village. She then falls in love with Pandithurai. Malaisamy, who is respected among the villagers, has a secret relationship with Sinthamani, a stage dancer. Pandithurai tries to stop their relationship, but he fails, and Malaisamy evicts him from his house.

The rest of the story is how Pandithurai punished his brother-in-law and married Muthulakshmi.

== Cast ==
- Prabhu as Pandithurai
- Khushbu as Muthulakshmi
- Radha Ravi as Malaisamy
- Manorama as Pandithurai's mother
- Sumithra as Pandithurai's sister
- Silk Smitha as Chinthamani
- Goundamani as Mayilsamy
- Senthil as Chola
- Mansoor Ali Khan as Narasimma
- Major Sundarrajan
- Ajay Rathnam as Rudramani
- Singamuthu

== Soundtrack ==
The music was composed by Ilaiyaraaja.

Song	Singer(s)	Lyrics	Duration
"Aana Solli Kodutha"	Mano	Vaali	4:59
"Enna Marantha"	K. S. Chithra, Mano	Gangai Amaran	5:03
"Ennaipaarthu"	K. S. Chithra	Piraisoodan	5:12
"Kaana Karunkuyil"	S. P. Balasubrahmanyam, Swarnalatha	Vaali	4:48
"Maalaiyitta Ponn"	Malaysia Vasudevan	Piraisoodan	4:38
"Malliye Chinna Mullaiyae"	Mano, Swarnalatha	Gangai Amaran	5:14

== Reception ==
The Indian Express wrote, "The script [..] and dialogues [..] exploit the poignant turns that are likely to be faced by a tradition-bound family in a village". C. R. K. of Kalki wrote that even actors could not rescue the film because of its outdated plot and direction.
