= Alakh Niranjan =

Hindu creator deity

Alakh Niranjan (अलख निरञ्जन) is a term used by Nath Hindus for the creator deity. The original Sanskrit term Alakhshya means "one that can not be perceived"
