= Yeh Raat Phir Na Aayegi (1992 film) =

1992 Bollywood horror thriller film

- Theatrical release poster
- Directed by: Nusrat Sayeed
- Written by: Nusrat Sayeed
- Produced by: Zakir-Shabbir
- Starring: Jeetendra; Meenakshi Sheshadri
- Cinematography: Rusi Billimoria
- Music by: Rajesh Roshan
- Production company: Zakir Hussain Films
- Release date: 15 October 1992
- Running time: 117 minutes
- Country: India
- Language: Hindi

Yeh Raat Phir Na Aayegi (transl. This Night Will Never Again Come) is a 1992 Indian Hindi-language horror thriller film, produced by Zakir-Shabbir on Zakir Hussain Films banner and directed by Nusrat Sayeed. Starring Jeetendra, Meenakshi Sheshadri and music composed by Rajesh Roshan.

== Cast ==
- Jeetendra as CBI Officer Sunil Malhotra
- Meenakshi Sheshadri as Radha
- Aruna Irani as Lajwanti
- Sujit Kumar as Jagannath
- Sadashiv Amrapurkar as Thakur Jaswant Kumar
- Vijayendra Ghatge as Ranjeet Singh / Shyamlal
- Laxmikant Berde as Constable Gilli
- Anil Dhawan as Ranjeet Singh
- Mac Mohan as Rajan
- Abid as Vijay
- Sharmilee as Karishma (Vijay's Girlfriend)
- Neelam Mehra as Gulabo
- Alpana Goswami as Roopa
- Kishore Bhanushali as Receptionist

== Soundtrack ==
Lyrics: Ibrahim Ashq, Raj Tilak, Payam Sayeedi.

Song	Singer	Pictured on
"Aa Bhi Jaa"	Asha Bhosle	Alpana later also on Meenakshi
"Hay Hay"	Alka Yagnik	Meenakshi
"Janoon Na Main"	Asha Bhosle, Anwar	Meenaskshi, Jeetendra
"Mehfil Hai Khamosh"	Kavita Krishnamurthy, Mohammed Aziz	Meenaskshi, Jeetendra
"Tu Muskura"	Vicky Mehta, Shobha Joshi	Abid & Sharmilee
