= Madhukar Toradmal =

Indian actor, writer, professor, translator (1932–2017)

- Born: 24 July 1932; Chalisgaon , British Raj
- Died: 2 July 2017 (aged 84); Mumbai, India
- Occupations: Actor; writer; professor; translator
- Years active: 1978–2015
- Notable work: Tarun Turk Mhatare Ark
- Children: 3(including Trupti Toradmal)

Madhukar Toradmal (24 July 1932 – 2 July 2017) was a Marathi actor, writer, professor and translator who acted in numerous Marathi dramas and movies. He translated over 20 plays. He was associated with Marathi theatre since 1971 and performed in 16 different plays and a variety of roles. He died on 2 July 2017 in Mumbai.

== Career ==
He was better known as "Mama" in the Theater industry, as a matter of respect. He lost his father at the age of 10. His uncle was a police officer in Mumbai. His uncle took him to Mumbai and out in the Seth Anandila Potdar school. On the first day of school, he showed interest in a school play to his class teacher Jaykar Madam. Pratidnyapurto was his first play which he directed in the school. The play was written by Chintaman Vinayak Joshi. Later during his school and college days, he directed many plays.

After school and college education, he joined as clerk at Premier Automobiles Limited, Mumbai. Later in 1968, he moved to Ahmednagar and became a professor of English at a college in Ahmednagar. Toradmal quit his job to take the plunge into acting and straddled the world of Marathi theatre and cinema for more than five decades. He formed an organization called "Rasikranjan", dedicated to Marathi plays. He also played important roles in the plays of the organization like Natysampada, Natyamandar, The Goa Hindu Association etc.

He played a famous role in the play Tarun Turk Mhatare Ark, which he wrote and directed. More than 5000 shows were done. Initially the show was projected as not suitable for high class ladies by the media. But this show was a great success. On 14 January 1972, the play was put on three times in a single day at Bal Gandharva Ranga Mandir,Pune, which was an all-time record at that time. These shows were attended by famous personalities like Bal Thackeray, G. D. Madgulkar, Vasant Desai and many more.

He had done a lot of writing, including novels like Tisari Ghanta, Uttarmamayan, etc.

=== Translation work ===
He translated many novels and plays into the Marathi language. This includes a series called Buddhipramanyawad, by Dhondo Keshav Karve. This also includes translations of 27 novels by Agatha Christie from English to Marathi.

== Stage appearances - Character name and play ==
- Aba (Bap Bilandar Beta Kalandar) आबा (बाप बिलंदर बेटा कलंदर)
- Akhercha Saval अखेरचा सवाल
- Bhovara भोवरा
- Indrasen Angre (Indrasen Angre) इंद्रसेन आंग्रे (काळे बेट लाल बत्ती)
- Daku (Sangharsh) डाकू (संघर्ष)
- Docter (Goodbye Docter) डॉक्टर (गुड बाय डॉक्टर)
- Docter Vishwamitra (Gosht Janmantarichi) डॉक्टर विश्वामित्र (गोष्ट जन्मांतरीची)
- Deenanath (Chandne SHimpit Ja) दीनानाथ (चांदणे शिंपीत जा)
- Dhanraj (Beiman) धनराज (बेईमान)
- Professor (Aashchary Number 10) प्रोफेसर (आश्चर्य नंबर दहा)
- Professor Bartakke (Tarun Turk Mhatare Ark) प्रोफेसर बारटक्के (तरुण तुर्क म्हातारे अर्क)
- Bahadursingh (Sainik Navacha Manus) बहादुरसिंग (सैनिक नावाचा माणूस)
- Barrister Devdatta (Akhercha Saval) बॅरिस्टर देवदत्त (अखेरचा सवाल)
- Bhishma (Matsygandha) भीष्म (मत्स्यगंधा)
- Mama (Soubhagy) मामा (सौभाग्य)
- Ramshstri (Mrugtrushna) रामशास्त्री (मृगतृष्णा)
- Lalya (Gharat Fulala Parijat) लाल्या (घरात फुलला पारिजात)
- Sarjan Kamat (Chafa Bolena) सर्जन कामत (चाफा बोलेना)

== Filmography ==
- Bala Gau Kashi Angai (1977)
- Sinhasan (1979) as Daulatrao
- Shabas Sunbai (1986)
- Raakh (1989) as Karmali Shet
- Nirantharam (1995) Telugu film

== Television ==
- Sangharsh

== Awards received ==
- 2009-10 Jeevan Gaurav award by Maharashtra government
- 2012- Maharashtra Sahitya Parishad

== Family ==
Toradmal had three daughters. One of the girls is Trupti Toradmal.

== Death ==
Toradmal was found dead in his residence on 2 July 2017. Earlier, he was admitted to Asian Heat hospital but his condition was not improving. He was suffering from kidney failure. Maharashtra Chief Minister Devendra Fadnavis condoled his passing. "With his demise, we have lost a versatile and multi-talented personality who enriched Marathi theatre and cinema."
