= Prabhakar Pendharkar =

Marathi writer

Prabhakar Pendharkar (1933–2010) was a Marathi writer. He was the son of film personality and director Bhalji Pendharkar. He worked under his father in the film sector and later in V. Shantaram's studio, Rajkamal. Pendharkar started his writing career with the magazine Deepavali. He also published various novels like Arey Sansar Sansar, Rarang Dhang and Chakrivadal. His long story Pratiksha received an award.

Pendharkar was credited in films including Toofan Aur Deeya (1956) as assistant director. In 1981, he also directed Marathi film Bal Shivaji.

Pendharkar received the award for Best News Review at the 33rd National Film Awards based on the life of Taranath Shenoy, a handicap swimmer who crossed the English Channel. The News Review was directed by M. S. Gangadhar and Ashok Patil and was co-produced by Pendharkar with Pritam S. Arshi.
