= List of 1940s films based on actual events =

This is a list of films and miniseries that are based on actual events. Films on this list are generally from American production unless indicated otherwise.

== 1940 ==
- A Dispatch from Reuters (1940) – biographical drama film about Paul Reuter, the man who built the famous news service that bears his name
- Abe Lincoln in Illinois (1940) – biographical historical drama film depicting the life of Abraham Lincoln from his departure from Kentucky until his election as President of the United States
- Arise, My Love (1940) – romantic comedy film telling the love story of a pilot and a journalist who meet in the latter days of the Spanish Civil War, based on the true story of Harold Edward Dahl
- Bismarck (1940) – Nazi German historical film depicting the life of the Prussian statesman Otto von Bismarck, a German nationalist and lonely genius who withstands the Reichstag to act on behalf of the people
- Brigham Young (1940) – biographical Western film depicting Brigham Young's succession to the presidency of the Church of Jesus Christ of Latter-day Saints after founder Joseph Smith was assassinated in 1844
- The Campaign in Poland (German: Feldzug in Polen) (1940) – Nazi German propaganda film depicting the 1939 invasion of Poland
- The Cavalier from Kruja (Italian: Il cavaliere di Kruja) (1940) – Italian war film depicting the 1939 Italian invasion of Albania
- Chandraguptha Chanakya (Tamil: சந்திரகுப்த சாணக்கியர்) (1940) – Indian Tamil-language historical drama film about Chandragupta Maurya, the founder of the Maurya Empire
- Confucius (Mandarin: 孔夫子) (1940) – Chinese biographical historical drama film depicting Confucius's later life, as he traveled across a China divided by war and strife in an ultimately futile effort to teach various warlords and kings his particular philosophy
- Dr. Ehrlich's Magic Bullet (1940) – biographical drama film based on the true story of the German doctor and scientist Dr. Paul Ehrlich
- Edison, the Man (1940) – biographical drama film depicting the life of inventor Thomas Edison
- Eternal Melodies (Italian: Melodie eterne) (1940) – Italian historical drama film depicting a heavily fictionalized account of the life of the Austrian composer Wolfgang Amadeus Mozart
- The Fighting 69th (1940) – action-adventure war film based upon the actual exploits of New York City's 69th Infantry Regiment during World War I
- Forty Thousand Horsemen (1940) – Australian war film telling the story of the Australian Light Horse which operated in the desert at the Sinai and Palestine campaign during World War I
- Gorky 3: My Universities (Russian: Мои университеты) (1940) – Soviet drama film depicting the continued life of Maxim Gorky as he reaches maturity with an insatiable desire for personal and artistic freedom
- The Heart of a Queen (German: Das Herz der Königin) (1940) – Nazi German biographical drama film making selective use of the life story of Mary, Queen of Scots, and her execution by Queen Elizabeth I for anti-English and pro-Scottish propaganda, in the context of the Second World War going on at the time
- Kit Carson (1940) – Western film about the life of Kit Carson
- Knute Rockne, All American (1940) – biographical drama film telling the story of Knute Rockne, Notre Dame's legendary football coach
- Lady with Red Hair (1940) – historical drama film telling the story of Leslie Carter's rise to fame on Broadway through collaborations with impresario David Belasco
- Lillian Russell (1940) – biographical historical drama film based on the life of singer and actress Lillian Russell
- Little Old New York (1940) – historical drama film depicting the story of the hardships of the engineer Robert Fulton in financing and building the first successful steam-powered ship in America, which would revolutionize river transportation and then ocean commerce around the world
- Lucrezia Borgia (1940) – Italian historical film portraying the life of Lucrezia Borgia
- Northwest Passage (1940) – Western film telling a partly fictionalized version of the real-life St. Francis Raid by Rogers' Rangers, led by Robert Rogers
- Parole Fixer (1940) – action drama crime film based on the 1938 book called Persons in Hiding, an exposé of corruption within the American parole system
- Pastor Hall (1940) – British drama film based on the true story of the German pastor Martin Niemöller who was sent to Dachau concentration camp for criticizing the Nazi Party
- Rembrandt (1940) – Dutch biographical historical drama film portraying the life of the Dutch artist Rembrandt
- The Return of Frank James (1940) – Western film following the life of Frank James following the death of his outlaw brother, Jesse James, at the hands of the Ford brothers
- The Rothschilds (German: Die Rothschilds) (1940) – Nazi German historical propaganda film depicting the role of the Rothschild family in the Napoleonic wars. The Jewish Rothschilds are depicted in a negative manner, consistent with the anti-Semitic policy of Nazi Germany
- Sant Dnyaneshwar (Hindi: संत ज्ञानेश्वर) (1940) – Indian Hindi-language biographical drama film about the life of Jñāneśvar, a 13th-century Marathi poet, philosopher, sant and yogi of the Nath tradition
- Santa Fe Trail (1940) – Western drama film depicting the story of J.E.B. Stuart and his mission to stop John Brown
- Sarajevo (French: De Mayerling à Sarajevo) (1940) – French historical drama film portraying the love affair and marriage between Archduke Franz Ferdinand of Austria and Sophie, Duchess of Hohenberg, leading up to their eventual assassination in 1914 in events that triggered the First World War
- Sarajevo (1940) – Hungarian historical film set against the backdrop of events leading up to the assassination of Archduke Franz Ferdinand of Austria in 1914
- The Sea Hawk (1940) – historical adventure film about Elizabethan England's struggles with Spain, inspired by the exploits of Sir Francis Drake
- The Three Codonas (German: Die drei Codonas) (1940) – Nazi German drama film based on the life of the circus performer Alfredo Codona
- The Westerner (1940) – Western film concerning a self-appointed hanging judge in Vinegaroon, Texas, who befriends a saddle tramp who opposes the judge's policy against homesteaders
- Yakov Sverdlov (Russian: Яков Свердлов) (1940) – Soviet biographical drama film about the life and work of the Chairman of the Central Executive Committee Yakov Sverdlov
- Young Tom Edison (1940) – biographical drama film about the early life of inventor Thomas Edison

== 1941 ==
- The 47 Ronin (Japanese: 元禄 忠臣蔵) (1941) – Japanese jidaigeki film depicting the legendary forty-seven Ronin and their plot to avenge the death of their lord, Asano Naganori, by killing Kira Yoshinaka, a shogunate official responsible for Asano being forced to commit seppuku
- Atlantic Ferry (1941) – British historical film about the building of the RMS Britannia
- Beatrice Cenci (1941) – Italian historical drama film portraying the story of the sixteenth century Italian noblewoman Beatrice Cenci
- Belle Starr (1941) – Western film loosely based on the life of 19th-century American outlaw Belle Starr
- Billy the Kid (1941) – Western biographical drama film about the relationship between frontier outlaw Billy the Kid and lawman Pat Garrett
- Birth of the Blues (1941) – musical drama film loosely following the origins and breakthrough success of the Original Dixieland Jass Band in New Orleans
- Blossoms in the Dust (1941) – biographical drama film telling the true story of Edna Gladney, who helped orphaned children find homes and began a campaign to remove the word "illegitimate" from Texas birth certificates, despite the opposition of "good" citizens
- Buck Privates (1941) – musical comedy film based on the peacetime draft of 1940
- Carl Peters (1941) – Nazi German anti-British propaganda film portraying the titular German colonial leader while he is under investigation by the Reichstag for unnecessary brutality
- Citizen Kane (1941) – quasi-biographical film examining the life and legacy of Charles Foster Kane, played by Welles, a composite character based on American media barons William Randolph Hearst and Joseph Pulitzer, Chicago tycoons Samuel Insull and Harold McCormick, as well as aspects of the screenwriters' own lives
- The Comedians (German: Komödianten) (1941) – Nazi German historical drama film set in the eighteenth century, portraying the development of German theatre
- The Gaucho Priest (Spanish: El cura gaucho) (1941) – Argentine historical drama film depiciting the life of José Gabriel Brochero, the Cordovan priest who dedicated his life to those most in need
- The Great Awakening (1941) – historical musical drama film telling the story of Franz Schubert as he flees from Vienna to avoid conscription, ending up in Hungary where he falls in love
- Harmon of Michigan (1941) – biographical sport drama film about University of Michigan football player Tom Harmon's post-collegiate career as a coach
- Hudson's Bay (1941) – adventure historical western film about a pair of French-Canadian explorers, Pierre-Esprit Radisson and Médard des Groseilliers, whose findings lead to the formation of the Hudson's Bay Company
- Man Hunt (1941) – thriller film portraying Britain's pre-war policy of appeasement with Germany
- Men of Boys Town (1941) – drama film about how Father Flanagan founded a home for homeless boys in Omaha, Nebraska called Boys Town
- One Foot in Heaven (1941) – biographical drama film depicting an episodic look at the life of a minister and his family as they move from one parish to another based on the autobiography by Hartzell Spence
- The Prime Minister (1941) – British historical drama film detailing the life and times of Benjamin Disraeli, who became Prime Minister of the United Kingdom
- Salavat Yulayev (Russian: Салават Юлаев) (1941) – Soviet biographical action drama film about Bashkir national hero, poet Salawat Yulayev and Pugachev's Rebellion
- Sergeant York (1941) – biographical drama film about Alvin C. York, one of the most decorated American soldiers of World War I
- Sikandar (Hindi: सिकंदर) (1941) – India Hindi-language epic historical film telling the story of Alexander the Great
- Suvorov (Russian: Суворов) (1941) – Soviet biographical film based on the life of Russian general Alexander Vasilyevich Suvorov
- The Swedish Nightingale (German: Die schwedische Nachtigall) (1941) – Nazi German musical biographical film about the romance between the writer Hans Christian Andersen and the opera singer Jenny Lind
- That Hamilton Woman (1941) – historical film telling the story of the rise and fall of Emma Hamilton, dance-hall girl and courtesan, who married Sir William Hamilton, British ambassador to the Kingdom of Naples, and later became Admiral Horatio Nelson's mistress
- They Died with Their Boots On (1941) – Western biographical drama film depicting a highly fictionalized account of the life of Gen. George Armstrong Custer, from the time he enters West Point military academy through the American Civil War and finally to his death at the Battle of the Little Bighorn
- Uncle Kruger (German: Ohm Krüger) (1941) – Nazi German biographical propaganda film depicting the life of the South African politician Paul Kruger and his eventual defeat by the British during the Boer War
- Western Union (1941) – Western drama film about the early days of the company Western Union
- You Will Remember (1941) – British musical drama film portraying the life of the composer Leslie Stuart

== 1942 ==
- 5 June (German: Der 5. Juni) (1942) – Nazi German war film depicting the events of 1940 when German forces successfully invaded France
- Adventurer (Swedish: En äventyrare) (1942) – Swedish historical adventure film loosely based on the life of the seventeenth century writer Lars Wivallius
- Alexander Parkhomenko (Russian: Александр Пархоменко) (1942) – Soviet adventure film telling the story of the life of Alexander Parkhomenko, the commander who served in times of civil war, which goes to Tsaritsyn and there, leading the "Red" battalions, forcing the enemy to leave the city
- Andreas Schlüter (1942) – Nazi German historical biographical film portraying the life of the 18th-century German architect Andreas Schlüter
- Apache Trail (1942) – Western film about Tom O'Folliard
- The Countess of Castiglione (Italian: La contessa Castiglione) (1942) – Italian historical film portraying the life of the nineteenth-century Italian aristocrat Virginia Oldoini, Countess of Castiglione, best known as the lover of Napoleon III of France
- Diesel (1942) – Nazi German historical biographical film about the life of Rudolf Diesel, the German inventor of the diesel engine
- The Dismissal (German: Die Entlassung) (1942) – Nazi German historical drama film about the dismissal of Otto von Bismarck
- Eagle Squadron (1942) – war drama film inspired by media reports of the fighting in the Battle of Britain, in particular, the American pilots who volunteered before the United States entered World War II, to fly for the Royal Air Force in the actual Eagle Squadrons
- The Fantastic Symphony (French: La Symphonie fantastique) (1942) – French biographical drama film based upon the life of the French composer Hector Berlioz
- The First of the Few (1942) – British biographical drama film about R. J. Mitchell, the designer of the Supermarine Spitfire fighter aircraft
- Flying Tigers (1942) – war drama film dramatizing the exploits of the American Volunteer Group (AVG), Americans who fought the Japanese in China during World War II
- For Me and My Gal (1942) – musical film inspired by a true story about vaudeville actors Harry Palmer and Jo Hayden, when Palmer was drafted into World War I
- The Foreman Went to France (1942) – British war drama film based on the real-life wartime exploits of Welsh munitions worker Melbourne Johns, who rescued machinery used to make guns for Spitfires and Hurricanes
- General von Döbeln (1942) – Swedish historical drama film about Lieutenant General and war hero Georg Carl von Döbeln
- Gentleman Jim (1942) – sport drama film about heavyweight boxing champion James J. Corbett
- Giarabub (1942) – Italian propaganda war film portraying the Siege of Giarabub during the Second World War, in which Italian troops defended Jaghbub, Libya for nine months against British forces
- The Great King (German: Der große König) (1942) – Nazi German drama film depicting the life of Frederick the Great, who ruled Prussia from 1740 to 1786
- The Great Mr. Handel (1942) – British historical drama film about the 18th-century German-British composer Georg Friedrich Händel, focusing in particular on the years leading up to his 1741 oratorio Messiah
- Hitler – Dead or Alive (1942) – propaganda war film depicting a team of ex-con bounty hunters who go to Germany in search of Hitler, inspired by real events
- In Which We Serve (1942) – British drama war film inspired by the exploits of Captain Lord Louis Mountbatten, who was in command of the destroyer HMS Kelly when it was sunk during the Battle of Crete
- Kotovsky (1942) – Soviet biographical propaganda film about Grigory Kotovsky, a famous participant in the Civil War, who several times managed to escape from prison and never lost on the battlefield
- The Loves of Edgar Allan Poe (1942) – biographical drama film about Edgar Allan Poe, examining his romantic relationships with Sarah Elmira Royster and Virginia Clemm
- Mahakavi Kalidas (Hindi: महाकवि कालिदास) (1942) – Indian Hindi-language historical film chronicling the life as well many challenges faced by Sanskrit poet Kalidasa
- Mlle. Desiree (French: Le Destin fabuleux de Désirée Clary) (1942) – French historical drama comedy film depicting the life of Désirée Clary, the daughter of a Marseilles merchant, who became Queen of Sweden and the founder of a dynasty
- My Gal Sal (1942) – musical film about 1890s composer and songwriter Paul Dresser and singer Sally Elliot
- Native Land (1942) – biographical drama film based on the 1938 report of the La Follette Committee's investigation of the repression of labor organizing
- Odessa in Flames (Italian: Odessa in fiamme; Romanian: Odessa în flăcări) (1942) – Italian-Romanian war drama film about the Battle of Odessa in 1941, where the city was taken in an operation that was primarily conducted by Romanian forces and elements of the German Army's 11th Army
- The Pride of the Yankees (1942) – sport drama film depicting the life and career of the legendary New York Yankees first baseman Lou Gehrig
- Race (Spanish: Raza) (1942) – Spanish propaganda war film about Francisco Franco, in favour of the regime and against the supporters of the deposed Second Spanish Republic
- Rembrandt (1942) – Nazi German historical drama film depicting the life of the Dutch painter Rembrandt
- Rossini (1942) – Italian musical drama film depicting adult life events of Italian composer Gioachino Rossini
- Simón Bolívar (1942) – Mexican historical drama film about the revolutionary Simón Bolívar who fought to end Spanish rule over much of Latin America
- Sky Hounds (German: Himmelhunde) – Nazi German propaganda film portraying Hitler Youth learning to build and fly gliders in preparation for their joining the Luftwaffe when they are older
- Tennessee Johnson (1942) – biographical drama film about Andrew Johnson, the 17th president of the United States
- They Flew Alone (1942) – British biographical drama film about aviator Amy Johnson
- Tombstone, the Town Too Tough to Die (1942) – Western film about the Gunfight at the OK Corral
- The Vanishing Virginian (1942) – biographical drama film based on the true story of turn-of-the-century Robert Yancey, lawyer and ever-popular politician in Virginia
- Wake Island (1942) – action war drama film telling the story of the United States military garrison on Wake Island and the onslaught by the Japanese following the attack on Pearl Harbor
- Whom the Gods Love (German: Wen die Götter lieben) (1942) – Austrian historical musical film about the Austrian composer Wolfgang Amadeus Mozart
- Yankee Doodle Dandy (1942) – biographical musical film about George M. Cohan, known as "The Man Who Owned Broadway"
- The Young Mr. Pitt (1942) – British biographical drama film of the life of William Pitt the Younger and in particular his struggle against revolutionary France and Napoleon

== 1943 ==
- Air Force (1943) – war film depicting the aftermath of the attack on Pearl Harbor, revolving around actual events that occurred on 7 December 1941
- Bataan (1943) – war film about the doomed defense of the Bataan Peninsula by American forces during World War II
- Bhakta Potana (Telugu: భక్త పోతన) (1943) – Indian Telugu-language biographical drama film based on the life of poet-saint Potana who translated Bhagavatham into Telugu language
- Chetniks! The Fighting Guerrillas (1943) – war drama film based on exploits of General Draža Mihailović, Yugoslav guerilla leader
- Day of Wrath (Danish: Vredens dag) (1943) – Danish drama film depicting an incident from 1590, when Anne Pedersdotter, the widow of priest Absalon Pederssøn Beyer, was accused of witchcraft and burned alive in the city of Bergen
- Dixie (1943) – biographical film about songwriter Daniel Decatur Emmett
- The Endless Road (German: Der Unendliche Weg) (1943) – Nazi German biographical drama film depicting the life of Friedrich List, a German who emigrated to the United States in the nineteenth century
- Fires Were Started (1943) – British biographical drama film showing the lives of firefighters through the Blitz during the Second World War
- The Flag Bearer (Spanish: El abanderado) (1943) – Spanish historical drama film depicting the Dos de Mayo Uprising and the events that led to the death of Captain Daoíz and Captain Velarde
- The Flemish Farm (1943) – British war drama film about commando raids in occupied Belgium, based on actual events
- Guadalcanal Diary (1943) – war drama film recounting the fight of the United States Marines in the Battle of Guadalcanal
- Gung Ho! (1943) – war film based somewhat on the real-life World War II Makin Island raid led by Lieutenant Colonel Evans Carlson's 2nd Marine Raider Battalion
- Hangmen Also Die! (1943) – war drama film loosely based on the 1942 assassination of Heydrich, the Nazi Reich Protector of German-occupied Prague during World War II
- Hitler's Madman (1943) – war drama film depicting a fictionalized account of the 1942 assassination of Nazi official Reinhard Heydrich and the resulting Lidice massacre, which the Germans committed as revenge
- The Iron Major (1943) – biographical film about the famed college football coach and World War I hero, Frank Cavanaugh
- Jack London (1943) – biographical war film based on the life of the writer-adventurer Jack London who was, among other things, oyster pirate, hobo, sailor, prospector and war correspondent
- Lightning in the South (Spanish: El rayo del sur) (1943) – Mexican biographical film portraying the life of José María Morelos
- Madame Curie (1943) – biographical drama film telling the story of Polish-French physicist Marie Curie in 1890s Paris as she begins to share a laboratory with her future husband, Pierre Curie
- Maria Malibran (1943) – Italian historical drama film based on the life of the Spanish singer Maria Malibran
- Mission to Moscow (1943) – propaganda film chronlincling the experiences of the second American ambassador to the Soviet Union, Joseph E. Davies, and was made in response to a request by Franklin D. Roosevelt
- The Outlaw (1943) – revisionist Western film about Billy the Kid
- Paracelsus (1943) – Nazi German drama film based on the life of Paracelsus
- The Powers Girl (1943) – musical comedy film about women employed by John Robert Powers' modeling agency
- Rita of Cascia (Italian : Rita da Cascia) (1943) – Italian historical film portraying the life of the Catholic saint Rita of Cascia
- Sivakavi (Tamil: சிவகவி) (1943) – Indian Tamil-language biographical drama film based on the life story of Poyyamozhi Pulavar
- So Proudly We Hail! (1943) – war drama film following a group of American Red Cross nurses sent to the Philippines during the early days of World War II based, in part, on Lieutenant Colonel Juanita Hipps' own experiences
- The Song of Bernadette (1943) – biographical drama film portraying the story of Bernadette Soubirous, who reportedly experienced eighteen visions of the Blessed Virgin Mary from February to July 1858 and was canonized in 1933
- Titanic (1943) – Nazi German historical propaganda film depicting the catastrophic sinking of RMS Titanic in 1912
- Undercover (1943) – British war drama film loosely based on Draza Mihailovich's Chetnik resistance movement
- Vienna 1910 (German: Wien 1910) (1943) – Nazi German biographical drama film based on the life of Mayor of Vienna Karl Lueger
- The Woman of the Town (1943) – Western drama film loosely based on the true stories of Dora Hand and Bat Masterson

== 1944 ==
- The Adventures of Mark Twain (1944) – biographical drama film depicting the dramatized life of immortal humorist Samuel Langhorne Clemens, better known as Mark Twain, from his days as a riverboat pilot on the Mississippi River until his death in 1910 shortly after Halley's Comet returned
- Buffalo Bill (1944) – Western drama film about the life of the frontiersman Buffalo Bill Cody
- Centauros del pasado (1944) – Argentine historical biographical film about Pancho Ramirez, a governor of Argentina's Entre Ríos Province during the Argentine War of Independence, and founder of the Republic of Entre Ríos
- Champagne Charlie (1944) – British musical film loosely based on the rivalry between the popular music hall performers George Leybourne, who was called "Champagne Charlie" because he was the first artist to perform the song of that title, and Alfred Vance, who was known as "The Great Vance"
- David Bek (Armenian: Դավիթ Բեկ) (1944) – Soviet biographical adventure drama film about Davit Bek, an Armenian nobleman and revolutionary
- Dreaming (German: Träumerei) (1944) – Nazi German historical musical drama film portraying the lives of the pianist Clara Schumann and her composer husband Robert Schumann
- Enemy of Women (1944) – anti-Nazi propaganda film about Joseph Goebbels
- The Fighting Seabees (1944) – war drama film portraying a heavily fictionalized account of the dilemma that led to the creation of the U.S. Navy's "Seabees" in World War II
- The Fighting Sullivans (1944) – biographical war film depicting the lives of five Irish-American Sullivan brothers, who grew up in Iowa during the days of the Great Depression and served together in the United States Navy during World War II
- Four Jills in a Jeep (1944) – comedy-drama musical film based on the actual experiences of Kay Francis, Carole Landis, Martha Raye and Mitzi Mayfair, members of the Feminine Theatrical Task Force who left the United States on 16 October 1942, and performed several shows per day for American and British troops in England, Ireland and North Africa
- The Great Moment (1944) – biographical drama film telling the story of Dr. William Thomas Green Morton, a 19th-century Boston dentist who discovered the use of ether for general anesthesia
- Henry V (1944) – British historical drama film, based on William Shakespeare's play of the same title, about King Henry V of England and the Battle of Agincourt in 1415
- His Best Student (Spanish: Su mejor alumno) (1944) – Argentine biographical drama film based on the life of Domingo Sarmiento, the son of a former president of Argentina and the father of public education in the country, Domingo Faustino Sarmiento
- The Hitler Gang (1944) – pseudo-documentary film which traces the political rise of Adolf Hitler
- Ivan the Terrible (Russian: Иван Грозный) (1944) – Soviet epic historical drama film depicting Ivan IV of Russia during the early part of his reign, as he faces betrayal from the aristocracy and even his closest friends as he tries to unite the Russian people
- Ladies Courageous (1944) – war drama film telling the story of the paramilitary Women's Auxiliary Ferrying Squadron formed in the United States during World War II
- Lisinski (1944) – Croatian biographical drama film about the life of Croatian composer Vatroslav Lisinski
- Marine Raiders (1944) – war drama film depicting fictionalized accounts of the Guadalcanal Campaign, the Battle of Edson's Ridge, and the Bougainville Campaign
- Mumtaz Mahal (Hindi: मुमताज महल) (1944) – Indian Hindi-language historical epic film showcasing the love story of Mughal emperor Shah Jehan and his favourite wife Mumtaz Mahal, and the former's efforts to create Taj Mahal for housing the tomb of Mahal after her death
- Noroshi wa Shanghai ni Agaru (Japanese: 狼煙は上海に揚る) (1944) – Japanese historical film centring on Takasugi Shinsaku's trip to China to foster alliances to resist Western imperialism in Asia
- Porfirio Díaz (1944) – Mexican historical adventure film portraying the life of the nineteenth century Mexican soldier and President Porfirio Díaz
- The Purple Heart (1944) – war film loosely based on the trial of eight US airmen who took part in the 18 April 1942, Doolittle Raid on Japan
- Ramshastri (Marathi: रामशास्त्री) (1944) – Indian Marathi-language biographical film based on the life of Ramshastri Prabhune, the judge who had to decide on Raghoba's culpability in Narayanrao Peshwa's murder
- The Rats of Tobruk (1944) – Australian action drama film based on the siege of the Libyan city of Tobruk in North Africa by Rommel's Afrika Korps
- Roger Touhy, Gangster (1944) – biographical gangster film based on the life of Chicago mob figure Roger Touhy
- Saint Francis of Assisi (Spanish: San Francisco de Asís) (1944) – Mexican historical drama film portraying the life of the Italian Saint Francis of Assisi
- Shine On, Harvest Moon (1944) – musical–biographical film about the vaudeville team of Nora Bayes and Jack Norworth who wrote the popular song "Shine On, Harvest Moon"
- The Story of Dr. Wassell (1944) – war drama film inspired by the wartime activities of U.S. Navy Doctor Corydon M. Wassell which were referred to by President Roosevelt in a radio broadcast made in April 1942
- Thirty Seconds Over Tokyo (1944) – war drama film about Captain Ted W. Lawson who was a pilot on the historic Doolittle Raid, America's first retaliatory air strike against Japan, four months after the 7 December 1941, Japanese attack on Pearl Harbor
- Wilson (1944) – biographical drama film about the 28th American President Woodrow Wilson
- Wing and a Prayer, The Story of Carrier X (1944) – war drama film about the heroic crew of an American aircraft carrier in the desperate early days of World War II in the Pacific Ocean

== 1945 ==
- A Royal Scandal (1945) – comedy-drama film about the lovelife of Russian empress Catherine the Great
- A Song to Remember (1945) – biographical film which tells a fictionalnaziised life story of Polish pianist and composer Frédéric Chopin
- Back in the Seventies (Spanish: Allá en el setenta y tantos) (1945) – Argentine historical drama film depicting the story of Élida Paso, an Argentine pharmacist who became the first woman from South America to graduate from a university
- Back to Bataan (1945) – war drama film depicting events that took place after the Battle of Bataan on the island of Luzon in the Philippines
- Blood on the Sun (1945) – spy thriller film based on a fictional history behind the Tanaka Memorial document
- Caesar and Cleopatra (1945) – British biographical drama film about how, at the height of the Roman Civil War, a young Cleopatra meets a middle-aged Julius Caesar, who teaches her how to rule Egypt
- Captain Eddie (1945) – biographical drama film based on the life of Edward Vernon Rickenbacker, from his experiences as a flying ace during World War I to his later involvement as a pioneering figure in civil aviation, and his iconic status as a business leader who was often at odds with labour unions and the government
- Captain Kidd (1945) – adventure film depicting the fictionalized adventures of pirate William Kidd
- Dillinger (1945) – gangster film telling the story of John Dillinger
- The Dolly Sisters (1945) – biographical drama film about the Dolly Sisters, identical twins who became famous as entertainers on Broadway and in Europe
- Fear No Evil (Italian: Il sole di Montecassino) (1945) – Italian drama film about the life of Benedict of Nursia
- God Is My Co-Pilot (1945) – biographical war film recounting Robert Scott's service with the Flying Tigers and the United States Army Air Forces in China and Burma during World War II
- The Great John L. (1945) – biographical drama film about the women in the life of prizefighter John L. Sullivan
- The House on 92nd Street (1945) – Film noir spy based on the life of William G. Sebold, who becomes a double agent for the FBI in a Nazi spy ring
- Humayun (Hindi: हुमायूँ) (1945) – Indian Hindi-language historical epic film about the life of Badshah Naseerudin Humayun
- Incendiary Blonde (1945) – musical drama film about 1920s nightclub star Texas Guinan
- José do Telhado (1945) – Portuguese historical adventure film portraying the life of the nineteenth century bandit José do Telhado
- Kolberg (1945) – Nazi German propaganda historical film recounting the defence of the besieged fortress town of Kolberg against French troops between April and July 1807, during the Napoleonic Wars
- Objective, Burma! (1945) – action war film loosely based on the six-month raid by Merrill's Marauders in the Burma Campaign during the Second World War
- Pride of the Marines (1945) – biographical war film telling the story of U.S. Marine Al Schmid in World War II, his heroic stand against a Japanese attack during the Battle of Guadalcanal, in which he was blinded by a grenade, and his subsequent rehabilitation
- Rhapsody in Blue (1945) – biographical musical film about composer and musician George Gershwin
- Stairway to Light (1945) – short drama film depicting the story of Philippe Pinel and his efforts in pointing out that the mentally ill should not be treated as animals
- The Story of G.I. Joe (1945) – biographical war film telling the stort of the American infantryman during World War II, told through the eyes of Pulitzer Prize-winning war correspondent Ernie Pyle
- They Were Expendable (1945) – war drama film depicting the story of the exploits of Motor Torpedo Boat Squadron Three, a United States PT boat unit defending the Philippines against Japanese invasion during the Battle of the Philippines in World War II
- Viennese Girls (German: Wiener Mädeln) (1945) – Austrian historical musical film about composer Carl Michael Ziehrer who produced twenty two operettas during his career

== 1946 ==
- Anna and the King of Siam (1946) – biographical drama film based on the fictionalized diaries of Anna Leonowens, an Anglo-Indian woman who claimed to be British and became governess in the Royal Court of Siam (now modern Thailand) during the 1860s
- Camões (1946) – Portuguese drama film portraying the life of Luís de Camões
- The Captive Heart (1946) – British war drama film partly based on the true story of a Czechoslovak officer in the RAF Volunteer Reserve, Josef Bryks MBE, and his relationship with a British WAAF, Gertrude Dellar, who was the widow of an RAF pilot
- Devotion (1946) – biographical drama film depicting a highly fictionalized account of the lives of the Brontë sisters
- Dr. Kotnis Ki Amar Kahani (Hindi: डॉ. कोटनिस की अमर कहानी) (1946) – Indian film based on the life of Dwarkanath Kotnis, an Indian doctor who worked in China during the Japanese invasion in World War II
- Gallant Journey (1946) – historical drama film based on the life of the early U.S. aviation pioneer John Joseph Montgomery
- The Great Glinka (Russian: Глинка) (1946) – Soviet biographical film about Mikhail Glinka, a Russian composer of the 19th century
- The Jolson Story (1946) – biographical musical film based on the life of singer Al Jolson
- The Magic Bow (1946) – British biographical musical film based on the life and loves of the Italian violinist and composer Niccolò Paganini
- Magnificent Doll (1946) – historical drama film about how in the late eighteenth century Dolley Payne Madison is wooed by Aaron Burr and James Madison
- Mary Magdalene: Sinner of Magdala (Spanish: María Magdalena: Pecadora de Magdala) (1946) – Mexican Christian drama film portraying the companion of Jesus Christ and his apostles, Mary Magdalene
- My Darling Clementine (1946) – Western film about Wyatt Earp during the period leading up to the gunfight at the O.K. Corral
- Night and Day (1946) – biographical musical film depicting a fictionalized account of the life of American composer and songwriter Cole Porter
- O.S.S. (1946) – spy war drama film portraying the activities of the Office of Strategic Services during World War II
- The Queen's Necklace (French: L'affaire du collier de la reine) (1946) – French historical drama film portraying the Affair of the Diamond Necklace which damaged the reputation of the French queen Marie Antionette during the 1780s
- School for Secrets (1946) – British drama film telling the story of the research scientists who discovered and developed radar and helped avoid the German invasion of Britain in 1940
- Shahjehan (Hindi: शाहजहां) (1946) – Indian Hindi-language drama film depicting a fictionalized account of an episode during the reign of Emperor Shahjehan
- Sister Kenny (1946) – biographical drama film about Sister Elizabeth Kenny, an Australian bush nurse, who fought to help people who suffered from polio, despite opposition from the medical establishment
- Smithy (1946) – Australian adventure film about pioneering Australian aviator Sir Charles Kingsford Smith and his 1928 flight across the Pacific Ocean, from San Francisco, California, United States to Brisbane, Queensland, Australia
- So Goes My Love (1946) – comedy-drama film based on a true story, A Genius in the Family, the memoir of Hiram Percy Maxim, which focuses on the relationship between Maxim and his father, Sir Hiram Stevens Maxim
- Theirs Is the Glory (1946) – British war drama film about the British 1st Airborne Division's involvement in the Battle of Arnhem during Operation Market Garden in the Second World War
- Thyagaiah (Telugu: త్యాగయ్య) (1946) – Indian Telugu-language film based on the life of the saint Tyagaraja
- Till the Clouds Roll By (1946) – biographical musical film portraying the life of composer Jerome Kern
- Valmiki (Tamil: வால்மீகி) (1946) – Indian Tamil-language drama film based on the story of the Hindu sage Valmiki, who starts as a bandit and eventually undergoes spiritual transformation into a religious mendicant

== 1947 ==
- Admiral Nakhimov (Russian: Адмирал Нахимов) (1947) – Soviet biographical drama film based on the life of Russian Admiral Pavel Nakhimov (1802–1855)
- Albéniz (1947) – Argentine biographical drama film based on the life of Spanish composer and pianist, Isaac Albéniz
- Alisher Navoi (Russian: Алишер Навои) (1947) – Soviet biographical drama film about the life of the famous poet and statesman Alisher Navoi
- The Beginning or the End (1947) – biographical drama film about the development of the atomic bomb in World War II
- Black Gold (1947) – Western drama film loosely based on the true story of the horse Black Gold, who won the 1924 Kentucky Derby
- Bohemian Rapture (Czech: Housle a sen) (1947) – Czech historical drama film portraying the life of the Czech violinist Josef Slavík, a contemporary of Frédéric Chopin, and a rival of Niccolò Paganini
- Boomerang (1947) – crime film based on the true story of a vagrant accused of murder who is found not guilty through the efforts of the prosecutor
- Captain Boycott (1947) – British historical drama film about Captain Charles Boycott
- Eleonora Duse (1947) – Italian biographical film portraying the life of the celebrated Italian actress Eleonora Duse
- The Fabulous Dorseys (1947) – musical biographical film telling the story of the brothers Tommy and Jimmy Dorsey, from their boyhood in Shenandoah, Pennsylvania through their rise, their breakup, and their personal reunion
- The Holy Crown (Spanish: Reina santa; Portuguese: Rainha Santa) (1947) – Spanish-Portuguese historical drama film portraying the life of Isabel of Aragon, a Spanish-born Queen of Portugal who played a role of peacemaker between different factions at the Portuguese court as well as between Portugal and Castile
- It's Only Love (German: Seine einzige Liebe) (1947) – Austrian historical musical film portraying the life of the composer Franz Schubert
- The Love of Sumako the Actress (Japanese: 女優須磨子の恋) (1947) – Japanese drama film portraying the life story of actress Sumako Matsui
- Miklukho-Maklai (Russian: Миклухо-Маклай) (1947) – Soviet drama film about the famous Russian ethnographer Nicholas Miklouho-Maclay and his travels to Australia and Oceania
- Monsieur Vincent (1947) – French biographical drama film about the life of Vincent de Paul, the 17th-century priest and charity worker
- Mrs. Fitzherbert (1947) – British historical drama film depicting the relationship between George IV and Maria Fitzherbert
- My Wild Irish Rose (1947) – biographical musical film depicting the life of Chauncey Olcott and traces the rise of an Irish-American tenor to stardom at the end of the 19th century and start of the 20th
- Palnati Yuddham (Telugu: పల్నాటి యుద్ధం) (1947) – Indian Telugu-language historical war film based on the Battle of Palnadu
- The Peanut Man (1947) – biographical drama film about the life of George Washington Carver
- The Perils of Pauline (1947) – comedy film depiciting a fictionalized account of silent film star Pearl White's rise to fame
- Pirogov (Russian: Пирогов) (1947) – Soviet biographical drama film based on the life of Russian scientist and doctor Nikolay Ivanovich Pirogov
- The Princess of the Ursines (Spanish: La princesa de los ursinos) (1947) – Spanish historical film loosely based on real events that took place in the eighteenth century reign of Philip V of Spain
- The Road to Hollywood (1947) – musical biographical film depicting the life of Bing Crosby
- Song of Love (1947) – biographical film about the relationship between renowned 19th-century musicians Clara Wieck Schumann and Robert Schumann
- Song of Scheherazade (1947) – musical biographical film depicting the life of the Russian composer Nikolai Rimsky-Korsakov in 1865, when he was a young naval officer on shore leave in Morocco
- Trail Street (1947) – Western film about the legendary Bat Masterson who brings law and order to the town of Liberal, Kansas, and defends the local farmers against a murderous cattle baron
- Without Prejudice (Russian: Миклухо-Маклай) (1947) – Soviet biographical drama film depictung the famous Russian ethnographer Nicholas Miklouho-Maclay and his travels to Australia and Oceania, where he watched the natives

== 1948 ==
- A Toast for Manolete (Spanish: Brindis a Manolete) (1948) – Spanish drama film about the celebrated Spanish bullfighter Manolete, who had been killed the previous year
- Alisher Navoi (Russian: Алишер Навои) (1948) – Soviet drama film about the life of the famous poet and statesman Alisher Navoi
- The Babe Ruth Story (1948) – biographical sport drama film about professional baseball player Babe Ruth, who achieved fame as a slugging outfielder for the New York Yankees
- Bonnie Prince Charlie (1948) – British biographical drama film depicting the 1745 Jacobite Rebellion and the role of Bonnie Prince Charlie within it
- Call Northside 777 (1948) – crime drama film based on Joseph Majczek, who was wrongly convicted of the murder of a Chicago policeman in 1932, one of the worst years of organized crime during Prohibition
- Du Guesclin (1948) – French biographical film about Bertrand du Guesclin, a baron, Constable of France, and high-ranked officer in the French Army of the 14th Century, who fights in the Hundred Years' War
- Fighting Father Dunne (1948) – biographical crime film about the life of Father Peter Dunne, and the creation of his News Boys Home in St. Louis, Missouri
- He Walked by Night (1948) – police procedural film noir loosely based on the real-life actions of Erwin "Machine-Gun" Walker, a former Glendale, California police department employee and World War II veteran who unleashed a crime spree of burglaries, robberies and shootouts in the Los Angeles area in 1945 and 1946
- The Iron Curtain (1948) – crime thriller film based on the story of Soviet cypher-clerk Igor Gouzenko who was posted to the Soviet Embassy in Ottawa, Canada in 1943 and defected in 1945 to reveal the extent of Soviet espionage activities directed against Canada
- Joan of Arc (1948) – hagiographic epic film depicting the life of Joan of Arc, the French religious icon and war heroine
- The Lame Devil (French: Le Diable boiteux) (1948) – French historical drama film depicting the life of the titular French diplomat Talleyrand
- Macbeth (1948) – historical drama film telling the story of the Scottish general who becomes the King of Scotland through treachery and murder, loosely based on Macbeth, King of Scotland
- Man to Men (French: D'homme à hommes) (1948) – French-Swiss biographical drama film depicting Henri Dunant and the founding of the Red Cross in the nineteenth century after he had witnessed the suffering of troops at the Battle of Solferino
- Michurin (Russian: Мичурин) (1948) – Soviet biographical film about the life of Russian practitioner of selection Ivan Michurin
- The Mozart Story (1948) – Austrian-American biographical drama film depicting the life of Wolfgang Amadeus Mozart
- Operation Swallow: The Battle for Heavy Water (Norwegian: Kampen om tungtvannet) (1948) – Norwegian-French action drama film based on the best known commando raid in Norway during World War II, where the resistance group Norwegian Independent Company 1 destroyed the heavy water plant at Vemork in Telemark in February 1943
- Saraband for Dead Lovers (1948) – British biographical drama film depicting the doomed romance between Philip Christoph von Königsmarck and Sophia Dorothea of Celle, the wife of the elector of Hanover
- Scott of the Antarctic (1948) – British biographical adventure film telling the story of Robert Falcon Scott in his ill-fated attempt to reach the South Pole
- Up in Central Park (1948) – musical comedy film about a newspaper reporter and the daughter of an immigrant maintenance man who help expose political corruption in New York City in the 1870s
- The Viking Watch of the Danish Seaman (Danish: Støt står den danske sømand) (1948) – Danish war drama film telling the true story of Danish sailors who sailed with the Allied forces during the German occupation of Denmark in World War II
- Words and Music (1948) – biographical musical film based on the creative partnership of the composer Richard Rodgers and lyricist Lorenz Hart

== 1949 ==
- Alexander Popov (Russian: Александр Попов) (1949) – Soviet biographical drama film about the life and work of Alexander Stepanovich Popov, who was a notable physicist and electrical engineer and an early developer of radio communication
- Almafuerte (1949) – Argentine drama film about the Argentine poet Pedro Bonifacio Palacios
- Anthony of Padua (Italian: Antonio di Padova) (1949) – Italian historical drama film portraying the life of Anthony of Padua
- The Bad Lord Byron (1949) – British historical drama film about the life of Lord Byron
- The Battle of Stalingrad (Russian: Сталинградская битва) (1949) – Soviet war drama film about the Battle of Stalingrad
- Battleground (1949) – war drama film following a company in the 327th Glider Infantry Regiment, 101st Airborne Division as they cope with the siege of Bastogne during the Battle of the Bulge, in World War II
- Christopher Columbus (1949) – Cinema of the United Kingdom biographical adventure film about Christopher Columbus and his four Spanish-based voyages across the Atlantic Ocean sponsored by the Catholic Monarchs, opening the way for the widespread European exploration and European colonization of the Americas
- Come to the Stable (1949) – comedy drama film telling the true story of the Abbey of Regina Laudis and the two French religious sisters who come to a small New England town and involve the townsfolk in helping them to build a children's hospital
- Doctor Laennec (French: Docteur Laennec) (1949) – French historical drama film portraying the work of René Laennec, the inventor of the stethoscope
- Encounter at the Elbe (Russian: Встреча на Эльбе) (1949) – Soviet war drama film describing the conflict, spying, and collaboration between the Soviet Army advancing from the east and the U.S. Army advancing from the west
- Eroica (1949) – Austrian biographical drama film depicting composer Ludwig van Beethoven's life and work
- Eureka Stockade (1949) – British historical drama meat pie Western film telling the story surrounding Irish-Australian rebel and politician Peter Lalor and the gold miners' rebellion of 1854 at the Eureka Stockade in Ballarat
- The Farm of Seven Sins (French: La Ferme des sept péchés) (1949) – French historical drama film depicting the story of Paul-Louis Courier's murder at the farm where he had retired
- The Fight Against Injustice (Danish: Kampen mod uretten) (1949) – Danish drama film about Peter Sabroe's fight for the well-being of children
- The Flame That Will Not Die (Italian: Fiamma che non si spegne) (1949) – Italian war drama film based on the story of Salvo D'Acquisto, a Carabinieri officer who died to save others being executed by the Germans during the Second World War
- The Great Dan Patch (1949) – sport drama film about the pacing horse Dan Patch
- Heaven over the Marshes (Italian: Cielo sulla palude) (1949) – Italian historical drama film portraying the life of the saint Maria Goretti
- I Shot Jesse James (1949) – Western film about the murder of Jesse James by Robert Ford and Robert Ford's life afterwards
- I Was a Male War Bride (1949) – comedy drama film based on the biography of Henri Rochard (pen name of Roger Charlier), a Belgian who married an American nurse
- Ivan Pavlov (Russian: Академик Иван Павлов) (1949) – Soviet biographical drama film portraying the life of the Russian scientist Ivan Pavlov, known for his Pavlov's dog experiments
- Jolson Sings Again (1949) – biographical musical film based on the life of singer Al Jolson
- Look for the Silver Lining (1949) – biographical musical film portraying the life of Broadway singer-dancer Marilyn Miller
- Lost Boundaries (1949) – drama film telling the story of Dr. Albert C. Johnston and his family, who passed for white while living in New England in the 1930s and 1940s
- Loyola, the Soldier Saint (Spanish: El capitán de Loyola) (1949) – Spanish biographical drama film portraying the life of Ignatius of Loyola
- Oh, You Beautiful Doll (1949) – biographical musical film showcasing a fictionalized biography of Fred Fisher, a German-born American writer of Tin Pan Alley songs
- Samson and Delilah (1949) – romantic drama film depicting the biblical story of Samson, a strongman whose secret lies in his uncut hair, and his love for Delilah, the woman who seduces him, discovers his secret, and then betrays him to the Philistines
- The Secret of Mayerling (French: Le secret de Mayerling) (1949) – French historical drama film about the 1889 Mayerling Incident when the crown prince of the Austrian Empire was found having apparently committed suicide with his lover
- Special Agent (1949) – film noir crime film loosely based on the DeAutremont Brothers' 1923 train robbery
- The Stratton Story (1949) – biographical drama film telling the true story of Monty Stratton, a Major League Baseball pitcher who pitched for the Chicago White Sox from 1934 to 1938
- Twelve O'Clock High (1949) – war drama film based on the novel of the same name by Sy Bartlett and Beirne Lay Jr., who drew deeply on their own wartime experiences
