= José do Telhado (disambiguation) =

José do Telhado may refer to:

- José do Telhado (1818-1875), a Portuguese bandit
- José do Telhado (1929 film), a Portuguese silent film
- José do Telhado (1945 film), a Portuguese film
- The Return of José do Telhado, a 1949 Portuguese film
