= The Return of José do Telhado =

- Directed by: Armando de Miranda
- Written by: Manuel Guimarães; Gentil Marques; Armando de Miranda
- Produced by: Armando de Miranda
- Starring: Virgílio Teixeira
- Cinematography: Aquilino Mendes
- Release date: 27 September 1949
- Running time: 123 minutes
- Country: Portugal
- Language: Portuguese

The Return of José do Telhado (Portuguese: A Volta de José do Telhado) is a 1949 Portuguese historical drama film directed by Armando de Miranda and starring Virgílio Teixeira as José do Telhado, a nineteenth century Portuguese bandit. Teixeira had previously played him in the 1945 film José do Telhado, which had also been directed by de Miranda.

The writers of this story are Manuel Guimarães, Gentil Marques, and Armando de Miranda.

== Partial cast ==
- Virgílio Teixeira as José do Telhado
- Eduardo Colombo
- Juvenal de Araújo
- Milú

== Censorship ==
The film was approved by the Censorship Commissions for Shows in Portugal but only after cuts were made.

== Bibliography ==
- João Fatela. O sangue e a rua: elementos para uma antropologia da violência em Portugal (1926-1946). Publicações Dom Quixote, 1989.
