= K. P. Lakshmana Rao =

Diwan Bahadur Sir Kasaragod Patanashetti Lakshmana Rao (15 December 1887 - ?) was an Indian lawyer who served as a judge of the Madras High Court.

== Early life ==
Lakshmana Rao was born in Madras on 15 December 1887 in a Goud Saraswat Brahmin family which traced its origins to South Canara. Lakshmana Rao had his education in Madras and graduated from the Presidency College, Madras. On graduating, Lakshmana Rao studied law at the Madras Law College and enrolled as a vakil.

== Career as judge ==
In 1930, Lakshmana Rao was appointed acting judge of the Madras High Court. His appointment was confirmed after a few years. One of the important cases heard by him in his tenure was the Lakshmikanthan Murder Case. He was knighted in the 1946 Birthday Honours list, a year before India's independence.

== Other activities ==
Lakshmana Rao also played cricket and was a fast medium bowler for the Madras Cricket Club. In 1936, he was elected to the club, one of the first Indians to be accepted and in 1947, he became one of the club's office-bearers.

Lakshmana Rao, however, was more popular as a lawn tennis player and was a part of the team which won the doubles' title in the first South Indian Lawn Championship Tournament held in Madras in 1917.
