= Manmadha Leelayai Vendrar Undo =

Song

"Manmadha Leelayai Vendrar Undo" is a Tamil song sung by M. K. Thyagaraja Bhagavathar in his 1944 film Haridas. The song is considered one of the first important film songs composed in Charukesi raga. Video clippings from the song are featured in almost all documentaries and short films on pre-independence Tamil cinema.

The song is sung by the lead character Haridas (played by Bhagavathar) for a sadir performance by a devadasi (played by T. R. Rajakumari). Haridas' wife (played by N. C. Vasanthakokilam) clandestinely views the performance and is incensed by the amorous courtship between Haridas and the devadasi.

The popularity of the song has triggered remixes in recent times. The song also propelled the popular usage of the term "Manmadha Leelai". A film named Manmadha Leelai was made in 1976 with Kamal Haasan in the lead. The song was remixed in the 2002 film, Panchathantiram, also starring Haasan.
