= Rino Lupo =

Italian-Portuguese film director

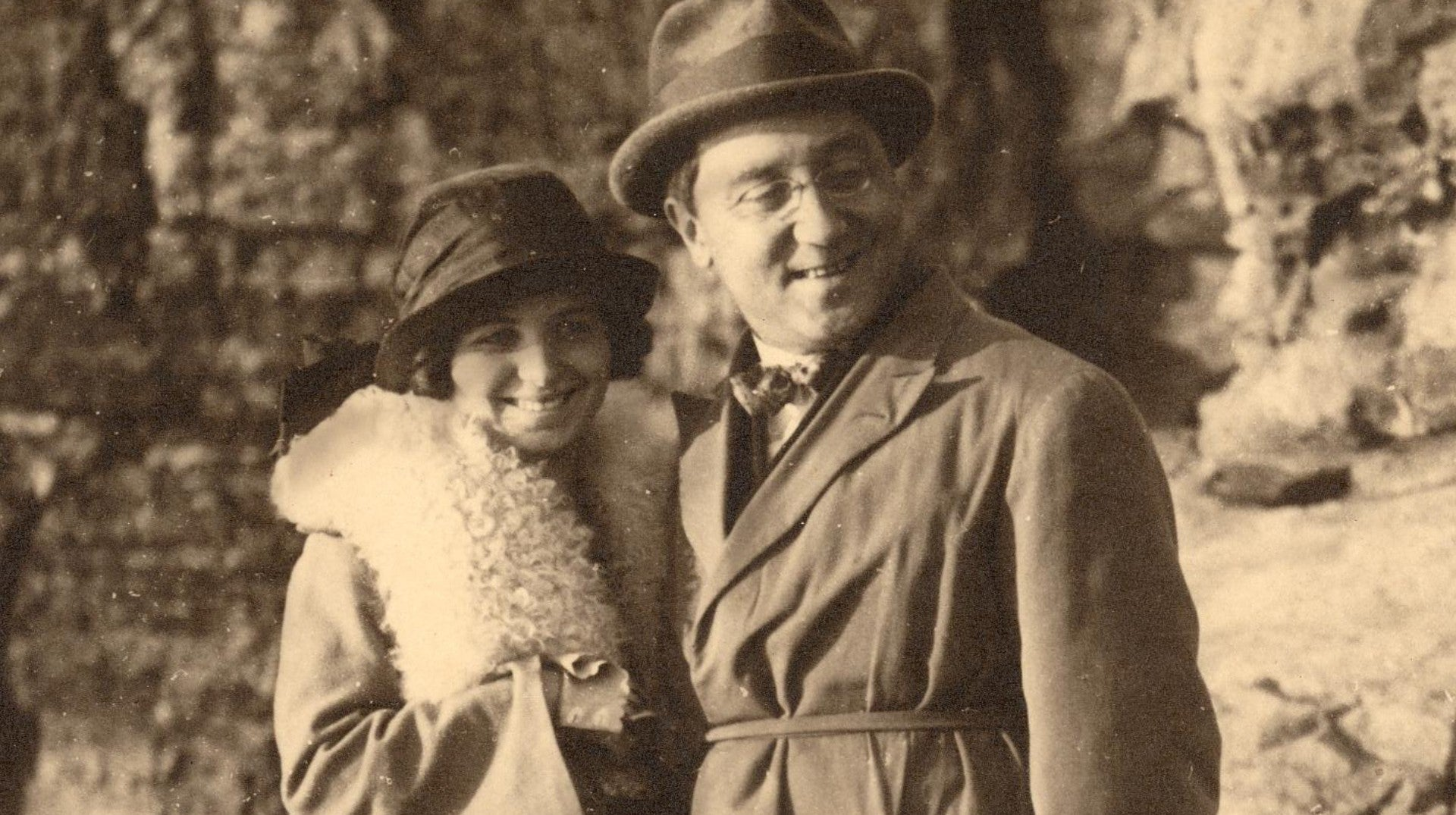
- Rino Lupo with Aida de Oliveira (not yet his wife) in the 1920s.
- Born: 15 February 1888; Rome, Lazio, Italy
- Died: 1934 (aged 45–46)
- Other name: Cesare Rino Lupo
- Occupations: Director, Writer
- Years active: 1915 - 1929 (film)

Rino Lupo (1888–1934) was an Italian-Portuguese film director. He made films in several countries during the silent era. He was forced to flee from Russia following the Russian Revolution in 1917.

== Selected filmography ==
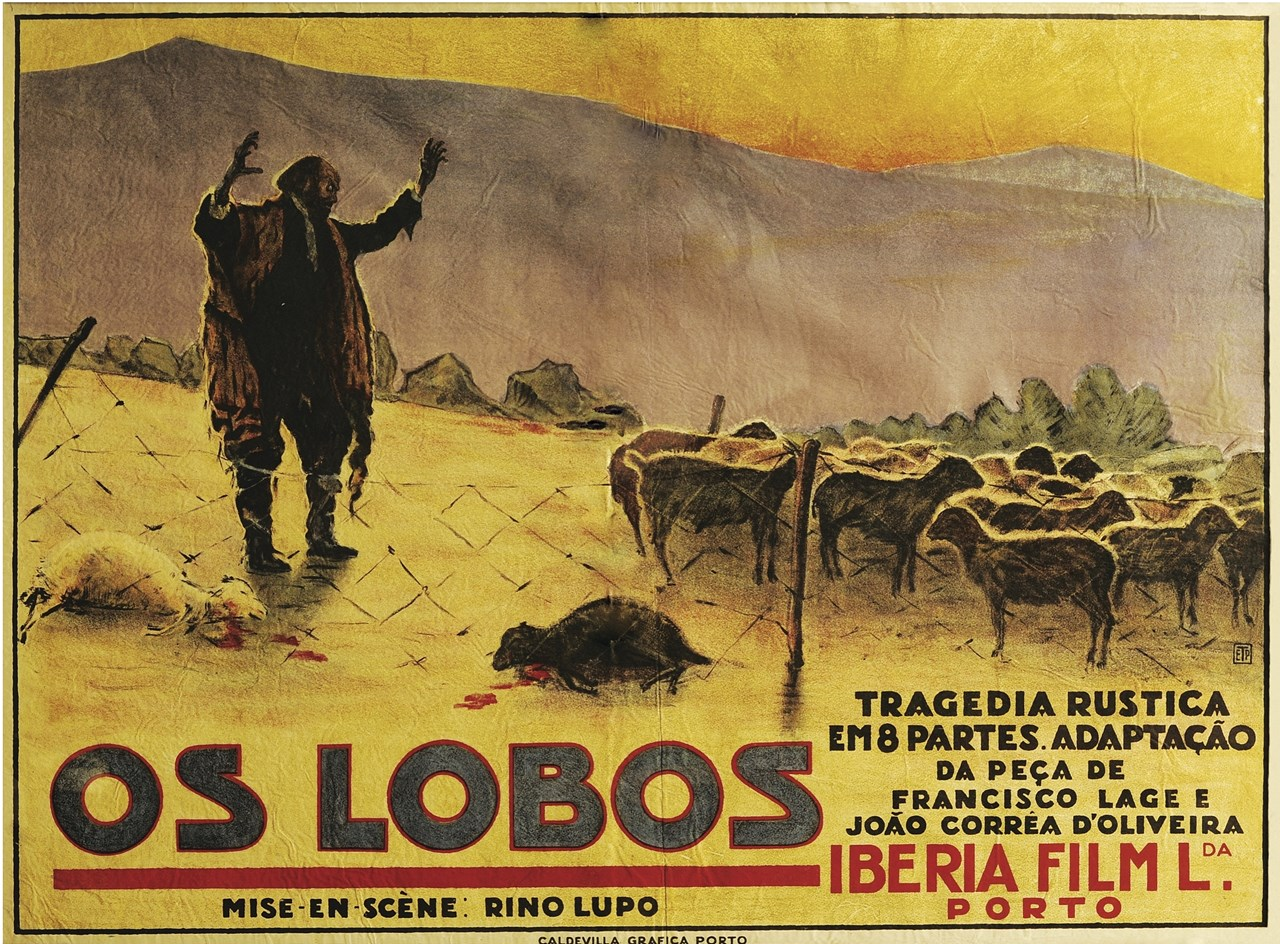
- Poster for The Wolves (1923)
  1915 - Wenn Völker streiten (uncredited)
- 1915 - Slør-Danserinden
- 1921 - Dwie urny (as Cezar Rino-Lupo)
- 1921 - Przez pieklo (as Cezar Rino-Lupo)
- 1923 – Mulheres da Beira
- 1923 – Os Lobos (The Wolves)
- 1926 – O Diabo em Lisboa (unfinished)
- 1926 – O Desconhecido (1926)
- 1926 – Carmiña, flor de Galicia
- 1927 – As Aventuras do Tenor Romão
- 1928 – Fátima Milagrosa
- 1929 – José do Telhado (1929)

== Bibliography ==
- Vieira, Patricia. Portuguese Film, 1930-1960,: The Staging of the New State Regime. A&C Black, 2013.
