= Armando de Miranda =

Portuguese film director, screenwriter, editor and producer (1904–1971)

- Born: 16 November 1904; Portimão, Portugal
- Died: 1975 (aged 70–71); Brazil
- Other name: Cesare Rino Lupo
- Occupations: Director, Writer
- Years active: 1937 - 1966 (film)

Armando de Miranda (1904–1975) was a Portuguese film director, screenwriter, editor and producer. He directed twenty six films, including a number of documentaries. He directed the 1945 historical adventure film José do Telhado and its 1949 sequel The Return of José do Telhado.

== Selected filmography ==
- José do Telhado (1945)
- Black Capes (1947)
- The Return of José do Telhado (1949)

== Bibliography ==
- Vieira, Patricia. Portuguese Film, 1930-1960,: The Staging of the New State Regime. A&C Black, 2013.
