= Gangavathar =

- Theatrical release poster
- Directed by: C. K. Sathasivam
- Starring: N. C. Vasanthakokilam; Nagarcoil K. Mahadevan
- Production companies: K. S. S. Pictures; Sundaram Studios
- Distributed by: K. S. S. Pictures
- Release date: 13 February 1942
- Country: India
- Language: Tamil

Gangavathar is a 1942 Indian Tamil-language Hindu mythological film directed by C. K. Sathasivam popularly known as C. K. Sachi and produced by Sundaram Sound Studio, Madras. The film starred N. C. Vasanthakokilam.

The film was released on 13 February, coinciding with Maha Shivaratri, a Hindu festival dedicated to Lord Shiva.

== Plot ==
The film is based on the story in Hindu beliefs related to the descent of the goddess Ganges to Earth.

== Cast ==
The list is adapted from the film's review article in The Hindu.

Male cast

- Nagercoil K. Mahadevan – Bhagiratha
- C. V. V. Panthulu – Shiva
- B. R. Panthulu
- P. G. Venkatesan – Narada
- D. Balasubramaniam
- M. Lakshmanan
- R. Rajagopalan
- Kali N. Rathnam
- T. S. Durairaj
- M. R. Swaminathan

Female cast

- N. C. Vasanthakokilam – Ganga
- T. S. Damayanthi – Parvati
- V. N. Janaki – Heavenly maiden
- S. K. Padmadevi
- T. V. Lakshmi
- C. T. Rajakantham
- P. R. Mangalam
- T.V.A. Poorani

== Production ==
The film was produced by Sundaram Sound Studio, Adyar, Chennai.

== Soundtrack ==
List of songs sung by N. C. Vasanthakokilam in this film.

1. "Paanganacholai Alangkaaram"
2. "Kalaivaani AruL Purivaai"
3. "Aanandham ALavillaa Miga Anandham"
4. "Idhuvenna Vedhanai"
5. "Jaya Jaya Buvanapathe Paalaya Jaya Karunajalathe"
6. "Aanandha Maaya Vaanulagidhe"
7. "Kaavin Manohara Kaatchiyin Maanbe"

== Reception ==
Writing in 2012, film historian Randor Guy said "The film did fairly well mainly due to its music and NCV's songs."
