= S. K. Padmadevi =

Indian film actress (1924–2019)

- Born: 1924; Bangalore, Karnataka, India
- Died: 19 September 2019 (aged 95); Bangalore, Karnataka, India
- Occupation: Actress
- Years active: since 1934
- Spouse: Padmanabha Rao

S. K. Padmadevi (1924 – 19 September 2019) was an Indian actress in the Kannada and Tamil film industries.

Padmadevi started working in Kannada theatre in 1930 and remained active on stage till 1960. Later she was associated with All India Radio for two decades.

She participated in “Bhakta Sudhama” by Kalaivani. The song “Yadukulanandanane” she sang in “Bhakta Sudhama” became popular at that time.

== Personal life ==
She was married to Padmanabha Rao, a theatre artist.

== Filmography ==
- Sati Sulochana (1934)
- Bhakta Dhruva (1934)
- Samsara Nauka (1936)
- Gangavathar (1942)
- Malgudi Days (TV series) (1987)

== Award ==
In 2016 she was awarded R. Nagendra Rao award by the Karnataka Chalanachitra Academy.
