= Sundar Rao Nadkarni =

Indian actor, editor, cinematographer, producer and director

Sundar Rao Nadkarni was an Indian film actor, editor, cinematographer, producer and director. He was the director of the first hit film for AVM productions Bhookailas in Telugu in the year 1940, and later the record-creating Tamil film Haridas.

== Early life ==
Sundar Rao Nadkarni was born in Mangalore, Karnataka. He started his career in Bangalore as an actor in silent films produced by Surya Films. Later, he moved to Bombay where he took to film direction and editing. Nadkarni caught the eye of film producer Avichi Meiyappa Chettiar who, after the success of Sabhapathy, was looking to make another comedy film. Thereon, he moved to Coimbatore and finally Madras, where he settled down permanently.

In 1942, Nadkarni directed the Tamil film En Manaivi which was a hit. Following this success, Nadkarni also made other successful Tamil films. But his greatest hit was the 1944 film Haridas which set a record by becoming the first Tamil film to run for 110 weeks at a single theatre. He directed all the top Tamil actors during his active years, notably M. K. Thyagaraja Bhagavathar and T. R. Rajakumari in Haridas (1944), Narsimha Bharathi in Krishna Vijayam (1950), and MGR and Savitri in Mahadevi (1957).

== Filmography ==
=== As director ===
Year	Title	Role(s)	Language	Notes
1928	Maya Na Rang	Director	Silent	
1930	Randhir	Director	Silent	
1930	Kaliko No Kop	Director	Silent	
1930	Dhoomketu	Director	Silent	
1931	Zindagi Nu Jugar	Director	Silent	
1931	Teer-e-Qatil	Director		
1931	Qurbani	Director		
1931	Ishq O Anjam	Director		
1931	Baaz Bahadur	Director		
1931	Asir-i-Hirs	Director		
1939	Shantha Sakkubai	Director, editor, actor, singer	Tamil	
1940	Bhookailas	Director	Telugu	
1942	En Manaivi	Director	Tamil	
1944	Haridas	Director	Tamil	
1946	Valmiki	Director	Tamil	
1950	Krishna Vijayam	Director	Tamil	
1953	Azhagi	Director	Tamil	
1955	Koteeswaran	Director	Tamil	
1957	Mahadhevi	Director	Tamil	
1963	Santha Thukaram	Director	Kannada	National Film Award for Best Feature Film in Kannada
