= Azhagi (1953 film) =

1953 film by Sundar Rao Nadkarni

- Directed by: Sundar Rao Nadkarni
- Written by: N. Swaminathan; Sridhar
- Story by: N. Swaminathan
- Produced by: T. S. Venkatasamy
- Starring: S. A. Natarajan; Krishna Kumari; M. N. Nambiar; Revathy; V. K. Ramasamy
- Cinematography: G. K. Ramu
- Edited by: Sundar Rao Nadkarni
- Music by: P. R. Mani
- Production company: Jupiter Pictures
- Release date: 13 December 1953
- Country: India
- Language: Tamil

Azhagi (transl. Beautiful Woman) is a 1953 Indian Tamil language film directed by Sundar Rao Nadkarni. The film stars S. A. Natarajan and Krishnakumari. It was released on 13 December 1953.

== Cast ==
The following list was compiled from Film News Anandan's database.

- S. A. Natarajan
- Krishnakumari
- M. N. Nambiar
- Revathy
- M. M. Mustapha
- C. K. Saraswathi
- V. K. Ramasamy
- Rathnam

== Soundtrack ==
Music was composed by P. R. Mani while the lyrics were penned by K. D. Santhanam and Kanagasurabhi.

Song	Singer/s
"Yereduthu Paarka Maatengire"	K. R. Sellamuthu & A. P. Komala
"Anjaadheenga Anjaadheenga"	K. R. Sellamuthu & A. P. Komala
"One Two Three; Photo Ready"	J. P. Chandrababu
"Aaraaro Aaraaro Aariraaro Amudhe"	Jikki
"Hello Darling Baby"	Jikki
"Mullai Malar Pol"	Jikki
