= En Manaivi =

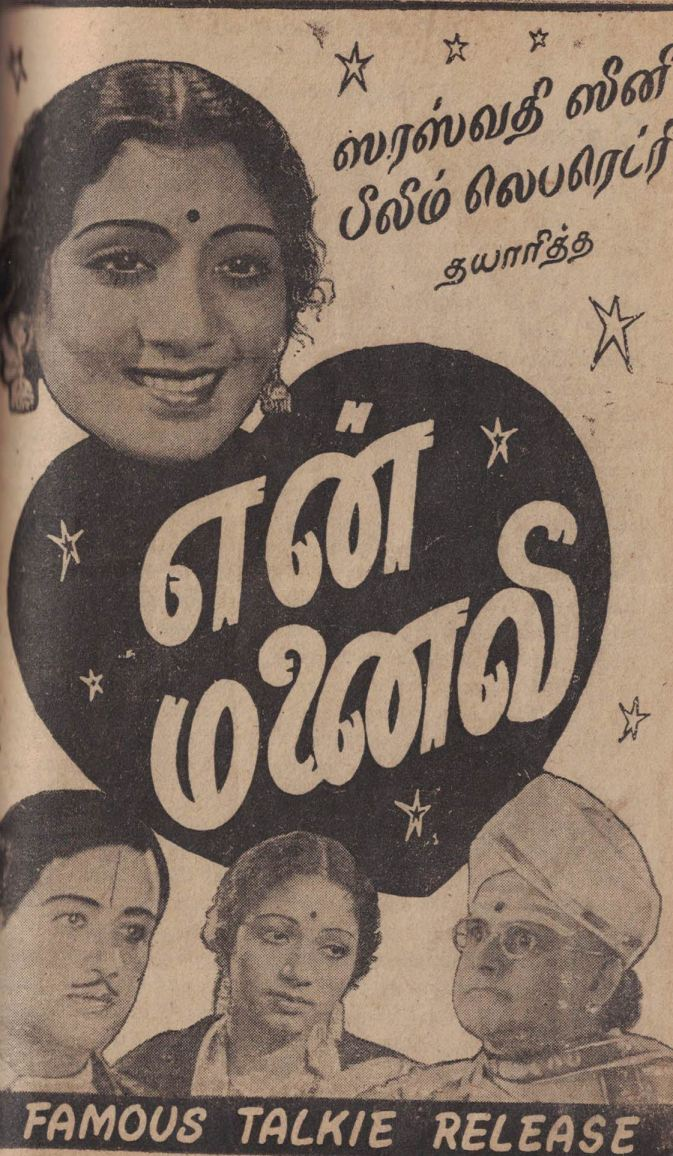
- Directed by: Sundar Rao Nadkarni
- Screenplay by: Sundar Rao Nadkarni
- Based on: Samshaya Kallol by G. B. Deval
- Produced by: A. V. Meiyappan
- Starring: K. Sarangapani; K. Mahadevan; M. K. Meenalochani; K. R. Chellam
- Cinematography: T. Muthuswamy
- Edited by: Sundar Rao Nadkarni
- Music by: Saraswathi Stores Orchestra
- Production company: Pragathi Pictures
- Distributed by: Famous Talkie Distributors
- Release date: 1942
- Country: India
- Language: Tamil

En Manaivi (transl. My Wife) is a 1942 Indian Tamil-language comedy film produced by A. V. Meiyappan and directed by Sundar Rao Nadkarni. It is based on the Marathi stage play "Samshai Kolli" which in turn was based on the French playwright Molière's Self- deceived Husband.

== Plot ==
In Madras, a wealthy young man, Dhanapal Gupta, secretly marries Revathy, a dancer from the dasi community, against her mother’s wishes. Meanwhile, Dr. Vembu Iyer, a middle-aged physician in Kodambakkam, is obsessively suspicious of his independent wife, Chellam.

One day, Iyer helps a fainting Revathy on the street, an encounter Chellam witnesses and misinterprets as an affair. Revathy accidentally drops a framed photograph of Dhanapal, which Chellam finds. When Iyer later sees his wife admiring the photograph, he wrongly assumes she has a secret lover, while Chellam accuses him of infidelity. The misunderstanding escalates when Iyer takes the photograph and searches the city for the man in it.

When Iyer finally encounters Dhanapal and shows him the picture, Dhanapal concludes that Revathy has been unfaithful and abandons her in despair. The remainder of the story revolves around untangling these mistaken identities and restoring the broken relationships.

== Cast ==
Male cast

- K. Sarangapani as Vembu Iyer
- K. Mahadevan as Dhanapal Gupta
- S. R. Krishna Iyengar as Gopal Gupta
- R. Natesa Iyer as Chef Subbu
- Appudu as Appayi

Male support cast

- N. S. Kannan, K. S. Jegadeeswara Iyer,
  K. V. Sornappa, G. Bhat and K. V. Shanmugam.

Female cast

- M. K. Meenalochani as Revathi
- K. R. Chellam as Chellam
- V. M. Pankajam as Baby
- R. Padma as Swathi
- T. R. Chandra as Rohini
- T. N. Chandramma as Dhanammal
- Lakshmikantham as Dhariha

== Production ==
After the success of his comedy Sabapathy, producer A. V. Meiyappan wanted to make another film in the same genre. He sought out Marathi film director Sundar Rao Nadkarni who had recently entered the Tamil film industry with Shantha Sakku Bai. The film was based on a Marathi stage play Samshaya Kallol which in turn was based on the French playwright Molière's Self- deceived Husband.

== Soundtrack ==
The lyrics were written by T. K. Sundara Vathiyar, with background music provided by the Saraswathi Stores Orchestra. The song Sangadamaana Samaiyalai vittu, sung by R. Nadesan, became particularly popular.
