= The Devil (2025 film) =

Indian action film

- Theatrical release poster
- Directed by: Prakash
- Written by: Prakash
- Produced by: Prakash; J. Jayamma
- Starring: Darshan; Rachana Rai; Mahesh Manjrekar; Achyuth Kumar; Sharmiela Mandre
- Cinematography: Sudhakar S. Raj
- Edited by: Harish Komme
- Music by: B. Ajaneesh Loknath
- Production companies: Vaishno Studios; Jai Mata Combines
- Release date: 11 December 2025
- Running time: 169 minutes
- Country: India
- Language: Kannada
- Box office: ₹43 crore

The Devil is a 2025 Indian Kannada-language political action thriller film written and directed by Prakash Veer and produced by Veer and J. Jayamma under the banners of Sri Jaimatha Combines, Vaishno Studios, and Saregama. The film features Darshan in a dual role as hero and villain, supported by Rachana Rai, Mahesh Manjrekar, Achyuth Kumar, Sharmiela Mandre, Roger Narayan, Shobaraj, and Srinivas Prabhu.

Principal photography for the film began in Bengaluru on 22 March 2024 but was temporarily halted in mid‑2024, when Darshan was arrested; filming resumed in February 2025. The cinematography is handled by Sudhakar S. Raj, and the music is composed by B. Ajaneesh Loknath.

The Devil premiered in theatres in Karnataka on 11 December 2025, with a runtime of 169 minutes. It received mixed-to-negative reviews from critics. The film is streaming from July 17th 2026 on Zee5.

== Synopsis ==
The film opens with Chief Minister Rajashekar being sentenced to prison on corruption charges, which have been orchestrated by his own nephews to undermine his political power. Desperate to retain control, Rajashekar tasks his trusted advisor, IAS officer Anant Nambiar, with finding his son Dhanush in London and bringing him to India to become the next chief minister.

Dhanush, a privileged and entitled young man, returns to a divided welcome. He is arrogant and violent, prioritising personal gain over public service. When he refuses to accept the responsibility and belittles Nambiar, Nambiar executes a daring plan: he recruits Krishna, a lookalike from Gandhinagar who runs a small eatery and aspires to be an actor, and convinces him to assume Dhanush's identity and lead the political campaign under supervision.

Upon entering the political scene, "Dhanush"—actually Krishna—instantly wins over the public with his genuine compassion. He connects emotionally with the masses, for instance by personally serving midday meals in government schools—a gesture that signals sincerity rather than political posturing. Meanwhile, Krishna grows closer to Rukmini, who sees him as a kind-hearted soul, and his warmth begins to soften her heart. Conflict emerges when the real Dhanush returns to India unexpectedly, overshadowing Krishna's growing acceptance. Dhanush's chaotic re-entry leads to confusion and emotional tension—especially when Rukmini mistakenly engages with him, leading to her abduction and a brewing rivalry between the two lookalikes. Nambiar uses the situation to manipulate both men while shoring up political support, blurring ethical lines in the process.

Striving to protect Rukmini and expose the truth, Krishna faces moral dilemmas and physical threats from Dhanush and the corrupt elements around him. Ultimately, the narrative converges on who is more deserving to claim the position of chief minister: the genuine everyman or the entitled heir.

== Cast ==
- Darshan in a double role as
  - Dhanush Rajashekhar aka Devil
  - Dhanush Rajashekhar aka Krishna
- Rachana Rai as Rukmini
- Mahesh Manjrekar as Chief Minister Rajashekar
- Achyuth Kumar as Anant Nambiar
- Sharmiela Mandre
- Roger Narayan
- Shobhraj
- Srinivas Prabhu
- Thulasi
- Huli Karthik
- Chandu Gowda
- Gilli Nata

== Production ==
The film was officially announced on 2 November 2023, and filming began on 22 March 2024, in Bengaluru. The project faced a major setback in mid-2024, when Darshan was arrested in connection with Renukaswamy's murder. In February 2025, filming resumed.

== Music ==
B. Ajaneesh Loknath composed the score for the film, with audio rights going to Saregama. The first single, "Idre Nemdiyaag Irbek", was released in August 2025, and shortly after, it clocked over 13 million views on YouTube.

Track listing
No.	Title	Lyrics	Singer(s)	Length
1.	"Devil Teaser Theme"	Instrumental	B. Ajaneesh Loknath	1:06
2.	"The Devil Motion Picture Theme"	Instrumental	B. Ajaneesh Loknath	1:06
3.	"Idre Nemdiyaag Irbek"	Aniruddha Sastry	Deepak Blue	4:19
4.	"Onde Ondu Sala"	Pramod Maravanthe	Kapil Kapilan, Chinmayi Sripaada	3:55
5.	"Alhomora – The True Emperor"	Aniruddha Sastry	Aniruddha Sastry	3:13
6.	"Yeno Onthara Chanda"	Pramod Maravanthe	Abby V, Harshika Devanath	4:48

== Marketing ==
The first glimpse of the film was released on 15 February 2024, and coincided with Darshan's birthday. The Times of India wrote, "With devilish dialogues and intense action sequences, the actor captivates audiences with his portrayal of a character still in mystery." A behind-the-scenes video was released on 10 May 2024.

== Release ==
The Devil was released on 11 December 2025, moved forward by one day from its initially planned 12 December launch to accommodate fan demand. The Devil is set to start streaming from July 17th 2026 on ZEE5.

== Reception ==
=== Box office ===
The Devil was reported to have netted around ₹10 crore (100 million) on its first day, with gross earnings around ₹13.8 crore (138 million). However, some sources have claimed earnings of ₹21 crore (210 million) for the first two days, while others estimated three-day earnings to be only ₹17.15 crore (171.5 million). First-weekend earnings were reported to be around ₹25 crore (250 million). While several sources reported that the movie had earned ₹260 million at the end of three weeks, a few claimed it had grossed ₹430 million in 25 days.

=== Critical reception ===
The Devil opened with mixed-to-negative reviews from critics. The Times of India gave it 2.5 out of 5 stars and wrote, "The Devil is a decent one-time watch for fans of mass cinema- just don't go in with high expectations." The Indian Express gave it 1.5 out of 5 stars, writing, "The latest film with Darshan, 48, is not only lazy and lacklustre in its writing and execution, but it is also objectionable in the way it treats its women." Vivek MV of The Hindu wrote, "The Devil has a lot to offer for ardent fans. That's an often-used expression to indirectly sum up a film."

Sruthi Raman of The Hollywood Reporter India wrote, "Prakash Veer's Kannada film twists and stretches a half-decent idea into dreadful form." Prathibha Joy of OTT Play gave the film 1.5 out of 5 stars and wrote, "Darshan vs Darshan is the bait, but is it worth a bite? Would you spend 3 hours on an outdated tale that's far from entertaining and has absolutely nothing by way of USPs?" Sanjay Ponnappa of India Today gave it 1.5 out of 5 stars and wrote, "Overall, the film is such a letdown that there's barely anything good to say about it. There are several scenes where the actor pays homage to his people – his "celebrities" – and those moments may offer some satisfaction to die-hard fans. For a casual viewer, The Devil can feel like hell for almost three hours."
