= Murder of Renukaswamy =

2024 kidnap and murder in Karnataka, India

Renukaswamy
- Born: 1991
- Died: 8 June 2024 (aged 32–33); Sumanahalli, Bengaluru, India
- Cause of death: Shock and haemorrhage
- Body discovered: Sumanahalli, Bengaluru
- Spouse: Sahana

Renukaswamy (1991 – 8 June 2024) was a resident of Chitradurga who was kidnapped and murdered by a group of men in Bengaluru in 2024; the gang was allegedly working with or for Kannada actor Darshan and would have attacked the victim in retaliation for lewd messages sent to Darshan's long-time partner, Pavithra Gowda. Although Renukaswamy was a habitual offender, not a fan of Darshan, Misinformation spread by Kannada Media and Journalists upon his death.As of 2025, the criminal case was still being investigated. In October 2025, they charged with Renukasway's death. On 29th October 2026, Key Witness Fails To Identify Darshan, Most Accused In Court for Renuka swamy Murder Trial.

== Victim background ==
Renukaswamy was the only son of Kashinatha Shivanagowdara and Rathnaprabha. As the sole breadwinner of his family, he married in 2023. At the time of his murder, his wife was pregnant with their first child. Renukaswamy worked at a pharmacy in Chitradurga, from where he was kidnapped and subsequently murdered in Bangalore.

It has been alleged that he was sending obscene, nudity and offensive messages to Pavithra Gowda. Renukaswamy had sent similar obscene messages to several other women. This controversy arose due to Darshan's relationship with Pavithra Gowda, despite still being married to his wife, Vijayalakshmi. On 16 October 2024, his son was born five months after the death of his father.

== Murder ==
On 7 June 2024, Renukaswamy was abducted by Raghu who is an associate of Darshan when he was held captive in the shed where he was beaten to death. According to some reports, Darshan allegedly beat the victim with a belt and gave him current shocks. His family reported him missing to Annapurneswari Nagar police station. On 9 June 2024, Darshan was on the set of his latest film The Devil when he was taken along with Pavithra Gowda for questioning.

Police said Ms Gowda was present in the shed for at least some time while Renukaswamy was beaten up with sticks and given multiple electric shocks. According to news agency PTI, it was Ms Gowda who instigated Darshan to punish Renukaswamy for the posts made by him.

The autopsy report says Renukaswamy died due to "shock haemorrhage as a result of multiple blunt injuries". Reports have said his testicles were ruptured and one of his ears was missing.

One of the accused Deepak Kumar, presently accused no. 13, has reportedly volunteered to be an approver in the case, the sources said. Deepak was in the shed, the scene of the crime, when Renukaswamy was killed, and he later distributed ₹5 lakh each to the four persons who surrendered to the police, confessing to the crime in a bid to protect Darshan, the police claimed.

However, Deepak has allegedly told the police that Darshan along with other accused tortured the victim and that it was the actor who kicked Renukaswamy on the private parts, which may have caused his death.

Renukaswamy's body was discovered at Sumanahalli Bridge by the police on 8 June 2024. His family, including his widow, demanded justice for him. Police officers Girish Naik and B. Dayananda were assigned to the case.

== Investigation and arrest ==
=== Timeline ===
==== 9 June 2024 - Body found near drain ====
An unidentified body with visible physical injuries was discovered near a drain in Sumanahalli, off Magadi Road. The security guard of a nearby apartment complex who stumbled upon the scene, found the corpse being disturbed by feral dogs. The guard chased the dogs away before alerting the authorities to the gruesome discovery.

==== 10 June 2024 - False confession of four youngsters who surrendered ====
Per the police report, Raghavendra, Karthik, Nikhil Naik, and Keshava Murthy surrendered at the Kamakshipalya police station around 7 PM on 10 June, confessing to the murder of Renukaswamy over a financial dispute. However, during questioning, the police found discrepancies in their statements. Further interrogation revealed Darshan's involvement in the case.

One of the accused, Deepak, had allegedly orchestrated a plan to protect Darshan. He offered Rs 5 lakh each to Nikhil Naik, Karthik, Raghavendra, and Keshava Murthy to conceal Darshan's name and take responsibility for the crime. According to Raghavendra’s statement, Nikhil and Keshava Murthy had already received Rs 5 lakh each. Karthik and Raghavendra's families were promised the money after their imprisonment. This revelation has added a complex layer to the investigation, as the police now have to probe the extent of Darshan's involvement and the motives behind the murder, beyond the initially claimed financial dispute.

An FSL (Forensic Science Laboratory) team visited the crime scene to gather all available evidence and corroborate the findings. The police recovered several critical pieces of evidence, including CCTV footage that captured key moments related to the crime. They also obtained call record details, which are being analyzed to trace communications among the accused and to establish a timeline of events.

Additionally, the police recovered a goods vehicle and an SUV that were allegedly used by the accused to transport Renukaswamy's body. These vehicles are being thoroughly examined for forensic evidence such as fingerprints, DNA, and other trace materials that might link the suspects to the crime.

==== 11 June 2024 - Darshan's arrest ====
On Tuesday, 11 June, Darshan was taken into custody in connection with a murder case. The police apprehended Darshan from a gym near a hotel in Mysuru, where he had been staying. Following his arrest, he was transported to Bengaluru by the jurisdictional police for further questioning. Later that day, the police made a significant announcement regarding the murder case of Renukaswamy. They disclosed that actor Darshan Thoogudeepa, his girlfriend Pavithra Gowda, and 11 others had been arrested. The charges against them included not only the murder of Renukaswamy but also attempting to destroy crucial evidence related to the crime.

==== 16 June 2024 - Court case begins ====
On 16 June, all the suspects accused in the murder of Renukaswamy were brought before the court for judicial proceedings. Among them, three suspects were remanded to judicial custody, indicating that they would be held in prison pending further legal proceedings.

Meanwhile, the police requested an extension of custody for Darshan Thoogudeepa, Pavithra Gowda, and 11 other suspects. The court granted this request, extending their police custody by five days. This extension allowed the police additional time to continue their interrogation, gather more evidence, and further investigate the roles and motives of the accused in connection with the murder case.

==== 22 June 2024 - Judicial Custody ====
On 22 June, prison officials formally designated Darshan Thoogudeepa as undertrial prisoner number 6106 at Parappana Agrahara Jail. Alongside him, the other suspects involved in the murder case of Renukaswamy were assigned subsequent prisoner numbers: Dhanaraj (6107), Vinay (6108), and Pradosh (6109).

Initially, due to the high-profile nature of the case and security concerns, Darshan and the co-accused were placed in a high-security cell within the prison premises. However, later on, they were transferred to the prison hospital for medical evaluation or treatment as needed. Subsequently, they were relocated to the regular barracks designated for undertrial prisoners within the jail.

The case was extended until 18 July and later 28 August. Darshan reportedly suffered from diarrhea and weight loss while imprisoned. He reportedly fainted and has recovered.

On 25 August, nine prison officials were suspended after a photo of them with Darshan went viral on social media.

On 3 September 2024, the Police filed a charge sheet against Darshan, Gowda, and others.

On 8 September 2024, Darshan confessed to hitting Renukaswamy.

==== 30 October 2024-present - Release on bail and cancellation of bail ====
After a plea from the actor regarding his detention conditions, Darshan was released on bail on 30 October 2024. The bail being cancelled in August 2025, the actor was sent back in custody.

==== Related developments ====
While covering this case, Rakshith Gowda, a journalist for The New Indian Express, was attacked by four unidentified men.

On 18 June, a specialised team proficient in cyber technology investigated whether Renukaswamy had been the victim of hacking or impersonation by another person who tried to pass for him to send a lewd message to Gowda. It was also revealed that Darshan's farmhouse manager took his own life in April.

== Reactions ==
Many celebrities, particularly from Kannada cinema and Telugu cinema, expressed shock and disbelief over Darshan's inclusion. Jaggesh and Rakshita, a frequent co-star of Darshan's, were among those on social media. Chetan Kumar pointed out that "there are observations connecting toxic masculinity with violence in movies which led to real-life consequences". One of his other frequent co-star, Ramya, spoke out against Darshan and demanded justice for Renukaswamy, and later his friend, Sudeep, also joined her by demanding justice. He said that celebrities should never be treated as demigods.

Upendra also demanded an inquiry on behalf of the victim's family. Ram Gopal Varma stated that a star used his fame to kill a fan, and director Hemanth M. Rao said that he was still shocked and heartbroken about the case. Protests in Chitradurga demanded that the Kannada Film Chamber completely ban Darshan from Kannada cinema. They also demanded strict punishment for him and Gowda, and called for a CBI inquiry into Renukaswamy's death for solidarity with the victim's family. Since Darshan has affiliations with Congress, BJP ex-MLA, R. Ashoka, demanded a ban on his future films. Sanjjanaa Galrani, Rachita Ram, Anusha Rai, Kasthuri Shankar, and Naga Shourya came to his defense. Deputy Chief Minister DK Shivakumar denied that Darshan received royal treatment at prison. Darshan's 15-year-old son, Vinesh, became a victim of cyberbullying on social media along with Gowda's daughter, Kushi.

Shiva Rajkumar, whose family knew the Thoogudeepa family for years, had expressed deep sympathy towards Renukaswamy's family and Vinesh. His co-star, Vinod Prabhakar, visited him in central prison on 24 June, followed by Prem and Rakshita. On 5 July 2024, Sumalatha Ambareesh expressed shock about the case. She said Darshan was like a son to her and her late husband. In August 2024, Malashree expressed support to Darshan.

=== Aftermath ===
Renukaswamy's parents met Chief Minister Siddaramaiah to obtain work for their son's widow.

== See also ==
- Lakshmikanthan murder case
