= Krishna Vijayam =

- Theatrical release poster
- Directed by: Sundar Rao Nadkarni
- Written by: Velavan; Karmayogi
- Screenplay by: Sundar Rao Nadkarni
- Based on: Epic Krishna Leela
- Produced by: M. Somasundaram; Mohideen
- Starring: N. C. Vasanthakokilam; P. V. Narasimha Bharathi; T. Premavathi; R. Balasubramaniam; A. L. Raghavan; Lakshmiprabha; M. R. Santhanam; Lalitha; Padmini
- Cinematography: P. Ramasamy
- Edited by: Sundar Rao Nadkarni
- Music by: S. M. Subbaiah Naidu; C. S. Jayaraman
- Production company: Jupiter Pictures
- Release date: 14 January 1950
- Country: India
- Language: Tamil

Krishna Vijayam (transl. Krishna's victory) is a 1950 Indian Tamil language Hindu mythological film written and directed by Sundar Rao Nadkarni. The film featured Carnatic music singer N. C. Vasanthakokilam in the role of Narada. Based on the epic story of Krishna's avatar, the film featured later-day playback singer A. L. Raghavan as the child Krishna. Adult Krishna was played by P. V. Narasimha Bharathi. It was released on 14 January 1950.

== Plot ==
The film is about the epic story of Krishna, an avatar of Lord Vishnu. The story is about his birth, elimination of his uncle, the King Kamsa and his boyhood leelas with gopikas.

== Cast ==
N. C. Vasanthakokilam as Narada

- R. Balasubramaniam as Kamsan
- Master A. L. Raghavan as Young Krishna
- P. V. Narasimha Bharathi as Radhakrishnan
- S. A. Natarajan
- N. C. Vasanthakokilam as Naradar
- T. Premavathi as Radha
- M. S. S. Bhagyam
- M. Lakshmiprabha

Dance

- Lalitha and Padmini as Gopikas

== Production ==
A. L. Raghavan was contracted with Baala Gaana Vinodha Sabha, a theatre troupe. Somasundaram Chettiar of Jupiter Pictures, impressed with his singing and acting prowess, decided to cast him as the younger Krishna in Krishna Vijayam, and gave ₹5,000 (US$52) to the theatre troupe to terminate Raghavan's contract with them. This was in 1946, when Raghavan was 13 years old.

== Soundtrack ==
Music was composed by S. M. Subbaiah Naidu and C. S. Jayaraman. The music for "Navaneetha Kannaney..." was scored by C. S. Jayaraman and the lyrics were written by K. P. Kamakshi. T. M. Soundararajan sang his first song "Radhey Nee Ennai Vittu Pokaathadi".

Song	Singer/s	Lyricist	Duration (m:ss)
"Navaneetha Kanna"	N. C. Vasanthakokilam	K. P. Kamakshi	
"Eppadi Sakippadhu"	Thiruchi Loganathan, S. S. Mani Bhagavathar, T. M. Soundararajan, K. S. Angamuthu & A. L. Raghavan		07:59
"Ennadi Aniyaayam Idhu"	P. Leela, K. V. Janaki, T. V. Rathnam, T. R. Bhagirathi & K. S. Angamuthu		07:22
"Vaasudevan Avatharithan"	N. C. Vasanthakokilam		03:22
"Radhey Nee Ennai Vittu Pokaathadi"	T. M. Soundararajan	Bhoomi Palakadas	03:40
"Vaasuki Paambu Thaampaki"	T. V. Rathnam & T. M. Soundararajan		05:00
"Porumai Kadalaagiya Boomaadhevi"	N. C. Vasanthakokilam		04:14
"Ullam Ellam Inba Vellam"	T. V. Rathnam & T. R. Bhagirathi		03:08

== Reception ==
According to historian Randor Guy, the film did not fare as well as expected. He theorised that by the time of its release, interest in medieval stories started waning among the audiences, especially because it was only the same studio that previously made Velaikari (1949), a contemporary story that was well received.
