= Valmiki (1946 film) =

- Theatrical release poster
- Directed by: Sundar Rao Nadkarni
- Produced by: B. Rangaswamy Naidu; S. M. Sriramulu Naidu; Samikannu Vincent
- Starring: Honnappa Bhagavathar; U. R. Jeevarathinam; T. R. Rajakumari; N. C. Vasanthakokilam; T. S. Balaiah
- Cinematography: P. Ramasamy; Muthusamy
- Edited by: Sundar Rao Nadkarni
- Music by: S. V. Venkatraman
- Production company: Central Studios
- Distributed by: Jupiter Pictures
- Release date: 13 April 1946
- Country: India
- Language: Tamil

Valmiki is a 1946 Indian Tamil-language film starring Honnappa Bhagavathar, U. R. Jeevarathinam, N. C. Vasanthakokilam, T. R. Rajakumari and T. S. Balaiah. It was directed by Sundar Rao Nadkarni.

== Plot ==
The film is based on the story of the Hindu sage Valmiki, who starts as a bandit and eventually undergoes spiritual transformation into a religious mendicant. Valmiki falls in love with a princess, who is kidnapped by the villain (played by T. S. Balaiah).

== Cast ==
Actor	Role
Honnappa Bhagavathar	Valmiki
U. R. Jeevarathinam	
T. R. Rajakumari	
N. C. Vasanthakokilam	Sage Narada
T. S. Balaiah	
D. Balasubramaniam	
Kali N. Rathnam	
C. T. Rajakantham	

== Production ==
The film began production in 1944 with M. K. Thyagaraja Bhagavathar as the lead actor. Mid-way through production, he was arrested in connection with the Lakshmikanthan murder case and with uncertainty over his release, the producers replaced him with Honnappa Bhagavathar; Thyagaraja Bhagavathar's scenes had to be re-shot.

== Soundtrack ==
The music was composed by S. V. Venkatraman and the lyrics were penned by Papanasam Sivan.

1. "Sundarananda Mukunda" by N. C. Vasanthakokilam
2. "Poi Thavazhum Maaya Bhoomi" by N. C. Vasanthakokilam
3. "Bhagawan Avadharipaar" by N. C. Vasanthakokilam
4. "Bhuvimeedhu" by N. C. Vasanthakokilam
5. "Ippozhudhe Varuvaar" by U. R. Jeevarathinam
6. "Bhagyasaaliyum Undo" by T. R. Rajakumari

== Release ==
Valmiki was released on 13 April 1946. According to historian Randor Guy, the film was a "reasonable success".
