= Haridas (1944 film) =

- Theatrical release poster
- Directed by: Sundar Rao Nadkarni
- Written by: Ilangovan
- Produced by: Rayal Talkie Distributors
- Starring: M. K. Thyagaraja Bhagavathar; T. R. Rajakumari; N. C. Vasanthakokilam
- Cinematography: Adi Irani; T. Muthuswamy
- Edited by: Sundar Rao Nadkarni
- Music by: Papanasam Sivan; G. Ramanathan
- Release date: 16 October 1944
- Running time: 117 minutes
- Country: India
- Language: Tamil

Haridas is a 1944 Tamil language film directed by Sundar Rao Nadkarni and starring M. K. Thyagaraja Bhagavathar, T. R. Rajakumari and N. C. Vasanthakokilam.

It holds the record for being the second longest-running Tamil film at a single theatre for 784 days, with the first being Chandramukhi (2005), running for 890 days. IBN Live included Haridas in its list of 100 greatest Indian films of all time. The film was initially released in black and white with just one scene in colour, which was manually colored by studio technicians. The film was re-released with full colour in 1946. It was the last film of M. K. Thyagaraja Bhagavathar before his two year imprisonment due to the Lakshmikanthan murder case.

== Plot ==
Haridas (Thyagaraja Bhagavathar) is a vain individual who spends his life in luxury and lust, ignoring his parents for his wife (Vasanthakokilam), and ignoring his wife for a courtesan (T. R. Rajakumari). But when his wealth is appropriated by the courtesan, he realizes life's realities, reforms and spends the rest of his days serving his parents and God.

== Cast ==
Cast according to the song book:

Male

- M. K. Thyagaraja Bhagavathar as Haridas
- P. B. Rangachari as Mahamunivar
- T. E. K. Achariar as Haridas's Father
- Annaji Rao as Lakshmi's Father
- S. R. Krishna Iyengar as Kannan
- N. S. Krishnan as Zamindar
- P. R. Rajagopala Iyer as Head Villager
- P. Ramaiah Sastri as Chettiar
- T. R. Ramasamy as Madhavi Das

Female

- N. C. Vasanthakokilam as Lakshmi, Haridas's Wife
- T. R. Rajakumari as Ramba (Dasi)
- M. A. Radha Bai as Harida's Mother
- T. A. Mathuram as Sarada, Ramba's Cook
- Baby Harini as Krishnan
- Pandari Bai

== Production ==
Haridas was directed by Sundar Rao Nadkarni, a Marathi film director, and produced by Rayal Talkie Distributors, a Madurai based Textile Yarn and Dye merchants at Central Studios in Coimbatore. The film was adapted from the book Sri Krishna Vijayam by Elangovan. It was based on the story of the life of a poet-saint called Haridas. The role of Haridas was played by M. K. Thyagaraja Bhagavathar, who was the highest-paid actor in the Tamil film industry at the time. It was very short (10,994 Feet) compared to other films from the same period. Featuring a number of melodious songs sung by Bhagavathar, the film was released on Diwali (16 October) 1944. Classical musician N. C. Vasanthakokilam, who was often compared to M. S. Subbulakshmi as a singer, played the role of Haridas' wife. The film also marked the debut of renowned Tamil actress Pandari Bai. The comedic duo of N. S. Krishnan and T. A. Mathuram were cast in this film. The film was shot at Central Studios, Coimbatore.

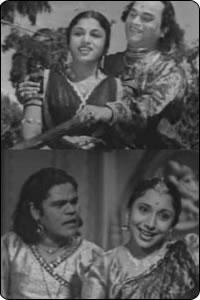
Upper: T. R. Rajakumari and M. K. Thyagaraja Bhagavathar Lower: N. S. Krishnan and T. A. Mathuram

== Soundtrack ==
All songs in this film became hits. The song "Manmadha Leelayai Vendrar Undo", based on Charukesi raga, celebrates erotic love and has become an enduring hit, with the phrase entering every day Tamil usage. Papanasam Sivan was the composer and G. Ramanathan was in charge of the orchestration. A partial list of songs from Haridas:

Two songs, sung by N. C. Vasanthakokilam ('Enadhu Manam Thulli Vilaiyaaduthe' and 'Kannaa Vaa') were recorded by HMV distinct from the film version of these songs and were released with black label. (See External links for link)

All lyrics are written by Papanasam Sivan.

No.	Title	Lyrics	Singer(s)	Length
1.	"Manmadha Leelayai Vendrar Undo"	Papanasam Sivan	M. K. Thyagaraja Bhagavathar	4:37
2.	"Vaazhvil Oru Thirunaal"	Papanasam Sivan	M. K. Thyagaraja Bhagavathar	2:46
3.	"Krishnaa Mukunda Muraree"	Papanasam Sivan	M. K. Thyagaraja Bhagavathar	3:21
4.	"Annaiyum Thanthaiyum"	Papanasam Sivan	M. K. Thyagaraja Bhagavathar	3:17
5.	"Nijamma Idhu Nijamma"	Papanasam Sivan	M. K. Thyagaraja Bhagavathar	2:15
6.	"Kadhiravan Udhayam"	Papanasam Sivan	M. K. Thyagaraja Bhagavathar	2:45
7.	"Ullam Kavarum En Paavai"	Papanasam Sivan	M. K. Thyagaraja Bhagavathar	2:30
8.	"Natanam Innum Aadanam"	Papanasam Sivan	M. K. Thyagaraja Bhagavathar	--
9.	"Ennalum Indha"	Papanasam Sivan	M. K. Thyagaraja Bhagavathar	--
10.	"Thottadharkellam"	Papanasam Sivan	M. K. Thyagaraja Bhagavathar	--
11.	"Enadhuyir Nadhar"	Papanasam Sivan	N. C. Vasanthakokilam	3:20
12.	"Ennudal Thanil"	Papanasam Sivan	M. K. Thyagaraja Bhagavathar	2:43
13.	"Kanna Vaa Manivanna Vaa"	Papanasam Sivan	N. C. Vasanthakokilam	2:59
14.	"Enathu Manam Thulli"	Papanasam Sivan	N. C. Vasanthakokilam	2:40
15.	"Kaavalai Tharum"	Papanasam Sivan	N. S. Krishnan. T. A. Mathuram	2:55
16.	"Kathathaikku"	Papanasam Sivan	Unknown	1:50

== Reception ==
Haridas hit the theatres on Diwali (16 October) 1944. It was a huge success and ran for three consecutive Diwalis at the Sun Theatres in Broadway, Madras. Across theatres it had an uninterrupted theatrical run of 133 weeks. With the profits earned from the film, the producers established a knitting company in Madurai. Bhagavathar became the Tamil cinema industry's highest paid star. However, he was not able to enjoy his success as he was arrested in November 1944 as a suspect in the Lakshmikanthan murder case. IBN Live included the film in its list of 100 greatest Indian films of all time.

== Bibliography ==
- Anandan, Film News (2004). Sadhanaigal padaitha Tamil Thiraipada Varalaaru (in Tamil). Chennai: Sivagami Publications. pp. 28.35, 33:2.
- Baskaran, S. Theodore (1996). The eye of the serpent: an introduction to Tamil cinema. Chennai: East West Books. p. 46.
- Dhananjayan, G. (2014). Pride of Tamil Cinema: 1931 to 2013. Blue Ocean Publishers.
- Limca book of records. Bisleri Beverages Ltd. 1996.
- Pillai, Swarnavel Eswaran (2015). Madras Studios: Narrative, Genre, and Ideology in Tamil Cinema. SAGE Publications. ISBN 978-93-5150-212-8.
- Thoraval, Yves (2000). The cinemas of India. India: Macmillan. p. 38. ISBN 0-333-93410-5.
