= José do Telhado (1945 film) =

- Directed by: Armando de Miranda
- Written by: António Reis; Armando de Miranda
- Produced by: Armando de Miranda
- Starring: Virgílio Teixeira; Adelina Campos; Juvenal de Araújo
- Cinematography: Octávio Bobone
- Edited by: Armando de Miranda
- Music by: Jaime Mendes
- Production company: Exclusivos Triunfo
- Distributed by: Exclusivos Triunfo
- Release date: 12 December 1945
- Running time: 98 minutes
- Country: Portugal
- Language: Portuguese

José do Telhado is a 1945 Portuguese historical adventure film directed by Armando de Miranda and starring Virgílio Teixeira, Adelina Campos and Juvenal de Araújo. It portrays the life of the nineteenth century bandit José do Telhado. A previous silent film José do Telhado had been released in 1929.

== Cast ==
- Virgílio Teixeira as José do Telhado
- Adelina Campos as Aninhas, José's wife
- Juvenal de Araújo as José Pequeno / Little Joseph
- Patrício Álvares as Boca Negra / Black-Mouth
- Fernando Silva as Gangster
- Flor de Almeida as Gangster
- Manuela Bonito as Baroness
- Jorge Grave as Administrative officer
- Anna Paula

== Bibliography ==
- Luís de Pina. A Aventura do cinema portuguęs. Vega, 1977.
