= N. C. Vasanthakokilam =

Indian singer

Nagapattinam Chandrashekharan Vasanthakokilam
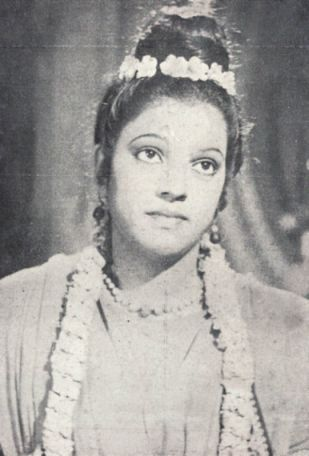
- Vasanthakokilam in the 1950 film Krishna Vijayam
- Born: Kamakshi; 1919; Irinjalakuda, Trichur Taluk, Cochin State, British India (now in Thrissur district, Kerala), India
- Died: 7 November 1951 (aged 32); Madras, Madras State (now Chennai, Tamil Nadu), India
- Occupations: Actor, Musician, Singer
- Father: Chandrashekharan Iyer

Nagapattinam Chandrashekharan Vasanthakokilam (1919 – 7 November 1951) was a Carnatic singer and actress. Her work included the performances of kritis by Tyagaraja and Muthuswami Dikshitar and in the years after Indian independence, she helped popularise the famous mystic poet of Tamil Nadu, Kavi Yogi Maharishi Dr. Shuddhananda Bharati's songs. She died of tuberculosis in 1951.

== Early life ==
NCV was born as Kamakshi in Irinjalakkuda, Cochin State of British India, the present Kerala. Her family then shifted to Nagapattinam, Madras Presidency (nowTamil Nadu). Her father, Chandrashekhara Iyer sent her under the tutelage of Nagapattinam 'Jalra' Gopala Iyer, an accompanist in Harikatha performances. In 1936, the family moved to Madras, where she started giving concerts. She won the first prize in vocal music at the Madras Music Academy annual conference of 1938, which was presided over by Ariyakudi Ramanuja Iyengar and declared open by the Yuvaraja of Mysore.

== Her Music ==
Her voice was described as melodious, with perfect intonation, sruti, emotion, and clear pronunciation of words. She was known for her skill in the rendering of higher octaves with ease. She was a regular performer of Tamil songs at the festivals of the Tamil Isai Sangam in Madras and Nellai Sangeetha Sabha in Thirunelveli.

She also performed for the Tyagaraja Aradhana each year from 1942 to 1951. NCV ranked among the top classical singers of that time and many records were released containing her classical and semi-classical songs. The famous Carnatic music vocalist Tiger Varadachariar had bestowed upon her the title "Madhurageetha Vani".

Some of her famous songs are:

- yen paLLi koNdeer ayyaa
- thanthai thaai irundhaal umakkindha
- nitiraiyil vandhu nenjil idam
- mahalakshmi jaganmatha
- aanandha nadanam aadinAL
- aasai koNdEn vaNdE
- thithikkum senthamizhaal dEsaabhimaanam enum
- andha naaL ini varumO
- varuvaanO vanakkuyilE
- aadu raattE
- saarasa dala nayana
- indha varam tharuvaan
- needayarada

=== Film Songs ===
She also sang the following songs for the Tamil film industry, which became very popular. The Tamil film songs are :

Year	Film	Song	Music	Production company
1940	Chandraguptha Chanakya		Papanasam Sivan	Trinity Theatres
1940	Venuganan	1. Punniya Dhinamindre Sri Kannan Pirandha Punniya Dhinam; 2. Eppo Varuvaaro Endhan Kali Theera; 3. Inbam Inbam Jagamengum	G. Govindarajulu Naidu	Jewel Pictures
1942	Gangavathar	1. Paanganacholai Alangkaaram; 2. Kalaivaani AruL Purivaai; 3. Aanandham ALavillaa Miga Anandham; 4. Idhuvenna Vedhanai; 5. Jaya Jaya Buvanapathe Paalaya Jaya Karunajalathe (See External links); 6.Aanandha Maaya Vaanulagidhe; 7. Kaavin Manohara Kaatchiyin Maanbe		Sundaram Sound Studios
1944	Haridas	1. Kadhiravan Udhayam Kandu KamalangaL Mugam Malarum; 2. Kannaa Vaa Mani Vannaa Vaa; 3. Enadhu Manam Thulli ViLayaadudhe; 4. Enadhu Uyir Naadhan Hrudhayam Nondhe Ennai Pirindhaan; 5. Thottadharkkellaam Thappedutthaal (with M. K. Thyagaraja Bhagavathar)	G. Ramanathan	Royal Talkie Distributors
1946	Valmiki	1. Sundaraanandha Vaikundhaa Hare Mukundhaa; 2. Puvi Meedhu Thava Gnaniye Uyar Pugazh Mevum Periyor Thanpaal; 3. Poithavazhum Maayappuvi Vaazhvu	Papanasam Sivan	Central Studios
1947	Kundalakesi		S. M. Subbaiah Naidu & G. Ramanathan	KSS Pictures
1950	Krishna Vijayam	1. Navaneedha Kannane Radhaamoha; 2. Karunanidhe Maadhava Nithya Kalyaana Guna Maadhava; 3. Porumai Kadalaagiya Boomadhevi	S. M. Subbaiah Naidu & C. S. Jayaraman	Jupiter Pictures

- pozhudhu pularnthadhu yAm seidha thavathAl
- kuzhalOsai kEtkudhammA gOplakrishnan
- thanthai thaai irundhaal umakkindha
- nitthiraiyil vandhu nenjil idam

== Acting career ==
Besides being a singer par excellence, NCV acted in movies. She started with Chandraguptha Chanakya (1940) playing the role of the princess Chaaya directed by C. K. Saachi in 1940. Followed by Venuganan (1940), Gangavathar (1942), Haridas (1944), Valmiki (1946), Kundalakesi (1946) and Krishna Vijayam (1950). Today, not many of her Carnatic renditions are available as CDs or audio recordings and those which are available contain both cinema and Carnatic compositions, mostly from various concerts she had given in the past.

== Personal life ==
Her personal life was an unhappy one. Her marriage had been a failure as her husband was not inclined to encourage her music pursuits. In later years, she found a life-partner in a lawyer turned film-maker, C. K. Sathasivan (known as C. K. Saachi) till her last days. She fell victim to a severe attack of tuberculosis, and died at the age of 32 on 7 November 1951, at her residence in Gopalapuram, a neighbourhood in present-day Chennai, Tamil Nadu.
