= Rembrandt (1940 film) =

- Directed by: Gerard Rutten
- Written by: Gerard Rutten
- Release date: 1940
- Country: Netherlands
- Language: Dutch

Rembrandt is a 1940 Dutch film directed by Gerard Rutten. It portrays the life of the Dutch artist Rembrandt (1606-1669). He had previously been played by Charles Laughton in the 1936 film Rembrandt. A 1942 German film was also made, starring Ewald Balser.

== Cast ==
- Anny de Lange
- Guus Verstraete
- Jules Verstraete
