= Chandraguptha Chanakya =

- N. C. Vasanthakokilam as Princess Chaaya
- சந்திரகுப்த சாணக்யா
- Directed by: C. K. Sachi (C. K. Sadasivam)
- Screenplay by: C. K. Sachi (C. K. Sadasivam)
- Based on: History of Chandragupta Maurya
- Produced by: C. K. Sachi (C. K. Sadasivam)
- Starring: Bhavani K. Sambamurthy; N. C. Vasanthakokilam; Brihadambal; T. K. Kalyanam; S. S. Kokko and P. Saradambal
- Cinematography: S. Das
- Music by: Papanasam Sivan
- Production company: Trinity Theatres
- Release date: 24 August 1940
- Running time: 14,000 ft.
- Country: India
- Language: Tamil

Chandraguptha Chanakya is a 1940 Indian Tamil language historical drama film produced and directed by C. K. Sachi, starring Bhavani K. Sambamurthy and N. C. Vasanthakokilam.

== Storyline ==
The film is about Chandragupta Maurya, the founder of the Maurya Empire, and his advisor Chanakya who is traditionally identified as Kautilya, who wrote Arthashastra.

== Cast ==
- Bhavani K. Sambamurthy as Chandragupta Maurya
- N. C. Vasanthakokilam as Princess Chaaya
- Brihadambal
- T. K. Kalyanam
- S. S. Kokko
- P. Saradambal

== Soundtrack ==
Papanasam Sivan composed the music. Several songs were by N. C. Vasanthakokilam.
