= Juvenal de Araújo =

Madeiran politician

Personal details
- Born: 21 November 1892
- Died: 2 November 1976 (aged 83)

Juvenal de Araújo (21 November 1892 – 2 November 1976) was a Madeiran politician.
