= José do Telhado (1929 film) =

1929 film

- Directed by: Rino Lupo
- Written by: Eduardo Noronha (novel); Rino Lupo
- Produced by: Carlos Lello
- Starring: Carlos Azedo
- Cinematography: Maurice Laumann
- Edited by: Rino Lupo
- Production company: Lupo Film
- Distributed by: Lupo Film
- Release date: 2 December 1929
- Country: Portugal
- Languages: Silent; Portuguese intertitles

José do Telhado is a 1929 Portuguese silent historical film directed by Rino Lupo. It portrays the life of the nineteenth century bandit José do Telhado.

== Cast ==
- Carlos Azedo as José 'Zé' do Telhado
- Rafael Alves
- Aida Cruz
- Luis Capinha
- Alberto Cardoso
- Maria Emília Castelo Branco as Maria Genoveva
- Zita de Oliveira as Ermelinda
- Ainda Lupo as Fidalguinha da Mo
- Luís Magalhães as José Pequeno
- Julieta Palmeiro as Aninhas
- João Celestino Pedroso
- Laura Vidal as Tia Isabel

== Bibliography ==
- João Fatela. O sangue e a rua: elementos para uma antropologia da violência em Portugal (1926-1946). Publicações Dom Quixote, 1989.
