= Lakshmikanthan murder case =

Criminal case in India

C. N. Lakshmikanthan
- Born: c. 1894; Madras, Madras Presidency, British India (present-day Chennai, Tamil Nadu, India)
- Died: 9 November 1944 (aged 49–50); Madras, Madras Province, British India (now Chennai, Tamil Nadu, India)
- Cause of death: Stabbing
- Occupation: Film journalist
- Known for: Victim of an unsolved murder

The Lakshmikanthan murder case was a high-profile criminal trial that was conducted in the then Madras Presidency of British India between November 1944 and April 1947. The cause of the trial was the murder of C. N. Lakshmikanthan, a Tamil film journalist. Lakshmikanthan was stabbed in Vepery, Madras, on 7 November 1944. He died the next morning in General Hospital, Madras.

A criminal case was filed and a series of suspects were arrested. The suspects included Tamil film actors M. K. Thyagaraja Bhagavathar and N. S. Krishnan and director S. M. Sriramulu Naidu. While Naidu was acquitted, Bhagavathar and Krishnan were found guilty and convicted. Bhagavathar and Krishnan appealed to the Madras High Court, but their appeals were turned down. The duo remained in jail until 1947, when an appeal to the Judicial Committee of the Privy Council was successful, and the Privy Council directed the sessions court to conduct a retrial. They were found to be innocent and acquitted. The case remains unsolved as the real killers were never identified.

The arrest completely broke Bhagavathar's morale. He lost all his money and died in 1959 in penury. Krishnan went on to do a few films, only some of which were successful.

== Background ==
=== The feud between the accused and Lakshmikanthan ===
C. N. Lakshmikanthan was an infamous film journalist in Madras Presidency. His foray into journalism began in 1943 when he launched a film weekly called Cinema Thoothu which was extremely successful, due to extensive columns devoted to the personal lives of some of the top actors and actresses of the day. Many actors and actresses responded by paying large amounts of money to "buy" his silence. As a result, Lakshmikanthan set up a prosperous vocation.

Eventually, matters reached a standstill when Bhagavathar, Krishnan, and Naidu submitted a memorandum to the Governor of Madras, Arthur Oswald James Hope, requesting him to revoke the license for the magazine. Hope obliged and the license for the magazine was cancelled. Lakshmikanthan tried to run the magazine with forged documents but, after a few months, he was forced to close shop.

Unfazed, Lakshmikanthan set up a new magazine called Hindu Nesan in which he continued his scandalous stories on Bhagavathar, Krishnan and a few other top actors, actresses and film people of the day. The tactics paid huge dividends and Lakshmikanthan purchased his own printing press.

=== Lakshmikanthan's background ===
Film historian and author Randor Guy writes that Lakshmikanthan had a dark past with a criminal record. As a young man, Lakshmikanthan desired to become a lawyer but could not afford the expense involved as his family was not well-off. However, with his sufficient knowledge of law, he managed to establish himself as a "tout". He was successful for some time but was eventually caught and convicted for forgery. He tried to escape but was captured and imprisoned on a seven-year term at Rajahmundry jail. He tried to escape once again but was caught and deported to the Andaman Islands.

Lakshmikanthan was eventually released when the islands came under Japanese occupation during the Second World War. He returned to India and established himself as a journalist.

== The murder ==
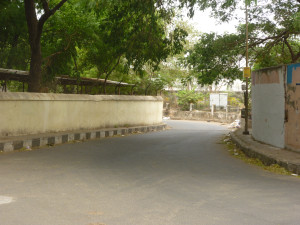
General Collins Road, Vepery

In the morning of 8 November 1944, Lakshmikanthan paid a visit to his close friend and lawyer, J. Nargunam, who lived in Vepery, a suburb in Madras. En route during return to his residence at the Venkatachala Mudali Street in Purasawalkam, another Madras suburb, by a hand-rickshaw at 10:00 (IST) in General Collins Road, he was attacked by a group of unknown assailants — one of whom stabbed him with a knife.

He reportedly suffered injuries in the left side of his abdomen among minor wounds on other parts of his body. The bleeding Lakshmikanthan managed to garner enough strength to walk to the lawyer's house, who listened to his description of the incident, and then sent him to General Hospital, Madras in the company of his friend, Brew.

On the way, Lakshmikanthan requested the rickshaw-driver to stop at Vepery police station to file a complaint against the assailants. At about that time, Brew took leave of him. Profusely bleeding and unable to move, Lakshmikanthan dictated his description of the incident while sitting in the rickshaw while inspector Krishnan Nambiyar wrote it down on a piece of paper.

At the General Hospital, Lakshmikanthan was admitted to the Wenlock Ward when bleeding in the abdomen did not cease. In the ward, Dr. P.R. Balakrishnan inspected his abdomen to check whether there was a serious wound. After this inspection, Lakshmikanthan's condition reportedly grew serious and he died at 4:15 a.m. (IST) on 9 November 1944 due to secondary shock caused by damage to the kidney. The Indian Express reported that he was "aged about fifty" at the time of his death.

== Arrests ==
On the day of the attack, the police arrested one Vadivelu. Six suspects were arrested in the days following the murder. Among them were Bhagavathar, Krishnan and Naidu. They were tried for the murder. Bhagavathar and Krishnan were convicted while Naidu was acquitted. The Madras High Court sentenced the duo to transportation for life. Krishnan and Bhagavathar appealed to the Judicial Committee of the Privy Council. However, by the time the Privy Council decided the appeal the duo had already spent 30 months in jail.

== Suspects ==
M. K. Thyagaraja Bhagavathar (1909-1959) was one of the biggest stars of early Tamil cinema. With his trademark long hair and his sweet voice, he set long-standing movie records. He was appreciated for his generosity and was perhaps the only film actor to be awarded a "Rao Bahadur" title (which he refused).

At the time of his arrest, Bhagavathar was at the peak of his success. He had just completed shooting for Haridas, which ran for three successful years at Sun Theatre in Broadway, Madras. He was the highest-paid Tamil actor at the time and had been signed for as many as 12 films at the time of his arrest.

=== N. S. Krishnan ===
N. S. Krishnan was a Tamil film comedian, drama artist, playback singer and writer in the early stages of the Tamil film industry. He is considered as the "Charlie Chaplin of India."

He acted in nearly 150 Tamil films and the matinee-duo of Krishnan and T. A. Madhuram (later his wife) in Tamil films was very popular; he did roles along with leading stage and cine artists. He was also a talented singer.

His jail term and fight for justice made him penurious; his wealth was lost in fighting the case.

== See also ==
- List of unsolved murders (1900–1979)
- Murder of Renukaswamy
