= José do Telhado =

José do Telhado or Zé do Telhado, nicknames of José Teixeira da Silva (Castelões de Recesinhos, Penafiel, 22 June 1818 — Mucari, Malanje, Angola, 1875) was a Portuguese bandit. He served in the 2nd Lancers Regiment of the Portuguese Army, where he took part in July 1837 in a failed attempt to restore the Constitutional Charter of 1826. After this failed attempt, he took refuge in Spain. He returned to Portugal when a popular revolt grew against the anticlerical government of Costa Cabral, resulting in the 23 March 1846 Revolution of Maria da Fonte, which he joined. He placed himself at the orders of General Sá da Bandeira. For his bravery in action he was awarded a knight of the Order of the Tower and Sword. However his faction lost, he collected debts of taxes he could not pay, and was expelled from the army. Soon after he became a notorious bandit. He was eventually captured in 31 March 1859, and presented to court in Porto 9 December 1859. He was sentenced to exile to the Portuguese colony of Angola where he lived for the remainder of his life in the area around Malanje. He is regarded as a Portuguese equivalent of Robin Hood as he stole from the rich to give to the poor.

== Popular culture ==
Zé do Telhado's exploits rapidly became part of Portuguese folklore and have been an inspiration for a number of plays and novels. Several films have been made about him, including the 1929 silent film José do Telhado, the 1945 film José do Telhado and The Return of José do Telhado in 1949.

== Bibliography ==
- Mike Stead, Sean Rorison, Oscar Scafidi. Angola. Bradt Travel Guides, 2013.
