= Katzhen =

- Release date: 2005
- Country: Israel
- Languages: Hebrew; German

Katzhen is a 2005 film directed by Guy Michael. It is considered as a modern-day Israeli Oliver Twist. The film tells the story of Katzhen, a young boy who, faced with the loss of his mother and an incapable father, chooses to steer his own path in life. Roaming throughout Israel in a quest for affection and the solidity of a warm family life, Katzhen finds it in unexpected places.

== Plot ==
Katzhen is left without a stable family structure upon the death of his mother. After his mother's funeral the young boy is shuttled from one unfit home to another; caught in a tug of war between his cold aunt and his promiscuous and suicidal uncle – neither of whom knows how to raise a child. He is eventually sent to a kibbutz where more loneliness and cruelty await him. He is forced to take charge of his own destiny but isn't quite capable enough to do so.

Katzhen is distant from other boys, seeming to exist in a world of his own. Despite the many hardships he faces, he never complains, and he rarely cries. Instead, his eyes absorb everything around him, trying to make sense of the scenes of death, sex, and violence that he witnesses. Rootless and insecure, but with a strong spirit and stoic attitude that speak to a maturity well beyond his young age, the little boy boldly tries to take control of his own destiny and find his place in the world.
