= Johnny Sharma =

Johnny Sharma is a black comedy short film made by Foreshadow Pictures, a group of filmmakers in Vadodara, Gujarat, India. The film revolves around Johnny, an obsessive young guy who wants to be a great director. It is an excerpt from the biography of his character, who has lost touch with reality.

According to directors Paritosh Bhole & Deep Panjwani the film describes the mentality of the common youth in modern India in a non-serious fashion. The scriptwriter Bhole said, "Johnny drinks, eats and thinks movies. Let us hope that he becomes a great director like Steven Spielberg, Scorsese or Kubrick!"

Indian critic Rajiv Masand said, "Excellent film, very cleverly done. It bangs on the charm and novelty of the character who brought out it very well. Very cheeky & brave film. It’s always good to see a film that pokes fun at itself!"

The movie was a winner in HOTSHORTS film festival in Vadodara. The movie continued to gain the attention of the press by winning the GET SHORTY competition held by Zee Studio. It became the official entry of Zee Studio into the Cannes Film Festival, but did not make it to the final twenty list.
