= Jacob's Sound =

- Directed by: Anna Dudley
- Starring: Tyhm Kennedy; Nicole Williams
- Release date: 2003

Jacob's Sound is a film directed by Anna Dudley released in 2003 starring Tyhm Kennedy and Nicole Williams.
