= Korea: Battleground for Liberty =

Korea: Battleground for Liberty is a 1959 documentary film about the Korean War directed by John Ford.
