= List of Hindi films of 1945 =

A list of films produced by the Bollywood film industry based in Mumbai in 1945:

== Highest-grossing films ==
The seven highest-grossing films at the Indian box office in 1945:

Rank	Title	Nett collection
1	Zeenat	₹70 lakh
2	Gaon Ki Gori	₹50 lakh
3	Badi Maa	₹45 lakh
4	Phool	₹40 lakh
5	Tadbir	₹38 lakh
6	Chand Chakori	₹35 lakh
7	Humayun	₹30 lakh

== A-C ==
Title	Director	Cast	Genre	Notes
Aarti	Ramchandra Thakur	Surendra, Vanmala, Hansa Wadkar, Sheikh Mukhtar, Kanhaiyalal, Ansari, Harish	Social	Music: Ali Baksh, Ashok Ghosh
Adhar	Pannalal Ghosh	Umakant, Kokila, Mehar Sultana, A.R. Pehalwan, Leela Pawar, Dalpat, Shakir	Social	Music: S. N. Tripathi; Lyrics: M A Razi
Albeli	R. C. Talwar	Ramola, Satish, Hiralal, Manorama, Sunder, Usha, Rooplekha	Social	Music: G. A. Chisti; Lyrics:
Alladin	Nanubhai Vakil	Prakash, Shanta Patel, N. A. Ansari, Rafiqe, Nawaz, Rekha Pawar	Costume Fantasy	Music: Damodar Sharma; Lyrics: Roopbani
Amiree	P. C. Barua	P. C. Barua, Jamuna, Ramola, Molina, Maya Banerji, Ahindra Choudhury, Sailen Choudhry	Social	Music: D. M. Tagore; Lyrics:
Amrapali	Nandlal Jaswantlal	Prem Adib, Sabita Devi, Jeevan, Arun Kumar, Gulab, Sankatha Prasad, Jagdish Sethi, Badri Prasad	Costume Drama	Music: Saraswati Devi; Lyrics:
Bachpan	Homi Wadia	Chandraprabha, Mazhar Khan, Shakuntala, Dixit, Gulab, Dalpat, Shashi Kapoor, Nandrekar	Social Family Drama	Music: S. N. Tripathi; Lyrics: I. C. Kapoor
Badi Maa	Master Vinayak	Noor Jehan, Sitara Devi, Meenakshi, Leela Mishra, Lata Mangeshkar, Ishwarlal, Girish	War Family Drama	Music: Datta Korgaonkar Lyrics: Zia Sarhadi, Anjum Pilibhiti
Ban Phool	Niren Lahiri	Kanan Devi, Ahindra Choudhury, Kamal Mitra, Hiralal, Debi Mukherjee, Krishnakant	Social	Music: Dhiren Mitra; Lyrics: Pandit Madhur
Begum	Sushil Majumdar	Ashok Kumar, Naseem Banu, V. H. Desai, Bikram Kapoor, Sharda	Social	Music: Hari Prasanna Das; Lyrics: Gopal Singh Nepali
Bhai Jaan	S. Khalil	Noor Jehan, Karan Dewan, Anees Khatoon, Nazir Kashmiri, Meena, Shah Nawaz, Ansari	Family drama	Music: Shyam Sunder Lyrics: Partau Lakhnavi
Bisvi Sadi	M. Bhavnani	Motilal, Nargis, Mazhar Khan, Gope, Ashalata, Navin, Bhudo Advani	Social	Music: Pannalal Ghosh; Lyrics:
Champa	Barkat Mehra	Zahur Shah, Asha Posley, Manorama, Majnu, Salma, Hari Shivdasani	Social	Music: Lachhiram Tamar, Anupam Ghatak; Lyrics:
Chand Chakori	Kidar Sharma	Surendra, Mumtaz Shanti, Maruti	Social	Music: Bulo C. Rani; Lyrics: Pandit Indra
Chand Tara	Mahesh Chandra	Swarnalata, Jagdish Sethi, Noor Mohammed Charlie, Pesi Patel, Kesari, Ghory, Indira	Social	Music: Gyan Dutt; Lyrics: Swami Ramanand Saraswati
Chhamia	Protima Dasgupta	Begum Para, Protima Dasgupta, Dixit, Azurie, Gulab, Arif, David	Social	Music: Gyan Dutt; Lyrics: Pandit Indra, Kabil Amritsari

== D-J ==
Title	Director	Cast	Genre	Notes
Devdasi	C. S. Bose	Prithviraj Kapoor, Monica Desai, K. C. Dey, Arvind Sen, Bikram Kapoor	Social	Music: K. C. Dey; Lyrics: Narottam Vyas
Dhamki	Ravindra Dave	Al Nasir, Ragini, Smriti Biswas, Om Prakash, Kalavati	Thriller noir	Music: Pandit Amarnath; Lyrics: D. N. Madhok
Dhanna Bhagat	Kidar Sharma	Kamla Chatterjee, Kamal Zamindar, N. Kabir, Pesi Patel, Shanta Kumari, Yashwant Dave, Rajinder Singh, Baby Madhubala	Biopic Devotional	Music: Khemchand Prakash; Lyrics: Pandit Indra
Dharm	Ramnik Desai	Leela Pande, Madhuri, E. Billimoria, Maya Devi, Jamshedji, Rattanbai	Social	Music: Sajjad Hussain; Lyrics: Shewan Rizvi, Baalam Pardesi
Din Raat	Roop K. Shorey	Raja Paranjpe, Snehprabha, Sulochana Chatterjee, Paresh Bannerjee, Vasant Thengdi	Social	Music: Chandekar
Ek Din Ka Sultan	Sohrab Modi	Mehtab, Sohrab Modi, Wasti, Ghulam Mohammed, Pratima Devi, Amir Bano	Historical Drama	Music: Shanti Kumar; Lyrics: Wali Saheb
Ghazal	Zahur Raja	Leela Chitnis, Zahur Raja, Radharani, Noor Mohammed Charlie, Gulab	Social	Music: Gyan Dutt; Lyrics: D. N. Madhok, Abid Gulrez, Shant Arora, Khawar Zaman
Gaon Ki Gori a.k.a. Village Girl	K. Amarnath	Noor Jehan, Nazir Ahmed Khan, Durga Khote, Geeta Nizami, Anant Marathe, M.A. Khan		Music: Shyam Sunder Lyrics: Wali Saheb
Ghar	V. M. Vyas	Jamuna, Nawab, Molina, Yakub, Dulari, Kalyani, Mirza Musharaf, W. M. Khan, Iftekhar	Family Drama	Music: Alla Rakha; Lyrics: Roopbani
Ghulami	Mohan Wadhwani	Renuka Devi, Masood, Parkash, David, Tiwari, Parvez, Nawab, Bharat Vyas, Ram Avtar	Social	Music: S. K. Pal; Lyrics: Bharat Vyas, Akhtar ul Iman, Majaz, Josh Malihabadi
Hamara Sansar	Shanti Kumar	Ranjana, Umakant, Jeevan, Sumati Gupte, Madhusudan, Athavale	Social	Music: Govind Ram; Lyrics: Ramesh Gupta
Hamrahi	Bimal Roy	Maya Basu, Radhamohan Bhattacharya, Tulsi Chakraborty, Binata Basu, Devbala, Hiralal, Manorama, Ramesh Sinha	Social	Music: R. C. Boral; Lyrics: Zaakir Hussain
Humayun	Mehboob Khan	Ashok Kumar, Veena, Nargis, Chandra Mohan, Shah Nawaz, Himalayawala, K. N. Singh	Historical Drama	Music: Ghulam Haider Lyrics:Shums Lucknavi, Arzoo Lucknowi
Ji Haan	Babubhai Mistry	Shanta Patel, Agha, S. Nazir, Meera, Gulab	Action	Music: S. N. Tripathi; Lyrics: Pandit Indra

== K-N ==
Title	Director	Cast	Genre	Notes
Kaise Kahoon	Moti B. Gidwani	Ragini, Jagirdar, Pran, Durga Mota, Najmal Hussain	Social Drama	Music: Pandit Amarnath Lyrics: Qamar Jalalabadi, D. N. Madhok, Moti
Khiladi	A. H. Essa	E. Billimoria, Rajkumari, Gope, Agha	Action	Music: Lyrics:
Kul Kalank	Nanubhai Vakil	Shanta Hublikar, Masood, Dulari, Majid, Shahzadi, W. M. Khan, Pratima Devi	Social	Music: Allah Rakha; Lyrics: Roopbani
Kurukshetra	Rameshwar Sinha	K. L. Saigal, Radharani, Nawab Kashmiri, Biman Bannerjee, Shanti, Agha Mohammed	Mythology	Music: Pandit Ganpat Rao; Lyrics: Jameel Mazhari
Laila Majnu	Nazir	Swarnalata, Nazir Ahmed Khan, K. N. Singh, Ismail, Gope, Anita	Legend Costume Drama	Music: Rafiq Ghaznavi, Gobind Ram Lyrics: Tanveer Naqvi
Lakharani	Vishram Bedekar	Urmila, Sapru, Durga Khote, Monica Desai, Azurie, Gouri, Ramsingh, Guru Dutt, Ram Singh	Costume Drama	Music: Krishna Rao; Lyrics: Qamar Jalalabadi
Mai Kya Karun	Sudhir Sen	Suraiya, Pahari Sanyal, Hansa Wadkar, E. Billimoria, Shah Nawaz, Bikram Kapoor	Social	Music: Ninu Majumdar; Lyrics: Rammurti Chaturvedi, D. N. Madhok
Mazdoor	Nitin Bose	Veera, Nasir Khan, K. N. Singh, Radhakrishan, S. Nazir, S. L. Puri, Indumati, Motibai	Social Drama	Music: H. P. Das; Lyrics: Gopal Singh Nepali
Meghdoot	Debaki Bose	Leela Desai, Shahu Modak, Wasti Agha, M. Gupte, Nimbalkar, Hari Shivdasani, Kusum Deshpande	Costume Drama	Music: Kamal Dasgupta; Lyrics: Faiyyaz Hashmi, Gauddas, Narottam Vyas
Moorti	Chaturbhuj Doshi	Motilal, Khursheed, Padma Bannerjee, Zamindar, Yashwant Dave	Social	Music: Bulo C. Rani; Lyrics: Pandit Indra
Nagma-e-Sahra	Bhagwan Dada	Master Vithal, Khurshid, Bhagwan Dada, Amarnath, Kavita Devi	Fantasy	Music: C. Ramchandra
Nasib	Vedi	Krishnakant, Najma, Kumar, Pramila, Sunetra, Leela Mishra, Jilloobai, David Ghory, Padmini	Social	Music: Gobind Ram; Lyrics: Rammurti Chaturvedi, Aziz Kashmiri, I. C. Kapoor
Nal Damyanti	Kumarsen Samarth	Prithviraj Kapoor, Shobhana Samarth	Mythology	Music: Lyrics:
Neelam	Essa	Harish, Khursheed, Sadhana Bose, Meena, Kanhaiyalal, Kalyani, Yashodhara Katju, Atish Sayani	Social	Music: Khan Mastana; Lyrics: C. M. Hunar

== O-R ==
Title	Director	Cast	Genre	Notes
Pannadai	Ram Daryani	Durga Khote, Chandra Mohan, Mubarak Meenaxi, M. Esmail, Vinay Kale, Master Vithal, Gope, Gulab, Leela Mishra, Azurie	Social	Music: Gyan Dutt; Lyrics: D. N. Madhok
Parinde	P. K. Atre	Surendra, Sitara Devi, Vanmala, Sunalini Devi, Baburao Pendharkar, Dixit, Jairam Desai,		Music: Gobind Ram; Lyrics: Rammurti Chaturvedi
Pehli Nazar	Mazhar Khan	Motilal, Veena, Munawwar Sultana, Baburao Pendharkar, Nemo, Bibbo, Balakram, Bhudo Advani, Cuckoo	Romantic Drama	Music: Anil Biswas; Lyrics: Safdar Aah
Phool	K. Asif	Suraiya, Prithviraj Kapoor, Veena, Yakub, Sitara Devi, Durga Khote, Dixit, Ashraf Khan, Agha, Mazhar Khan, M. Esmail, Jilloo	Romantic Family Drama	Music: Ghulam Haider; Lyrics: Rammurti Chaturvedi
Piya Milan	S. M. Yusuf	Motilal, Nirmala Devi, Najma, W. M. Khan, Leela Mishra, Mirza Musharraf	Social	Music: Firoz Nizami; Lyrics: Tanveer Naqvi, M. Naseem
Prabhu Ka Ghar	Wajahat Mirza	Trilok Kapoor, Khursheed, Sulochana Chatterjee, Bipin Gupta, Prakash, Nagendra	Devotional	Music: Bulo C. Rani; Lyrics: Pandit Indra
Pratima	P. Jairaj	Dilip Kumar, Swarnalata, Shah Nawaz, Mumtaz Ali, Jyoti, Mukri, P. F. Peethawala	Social	Music: Arun Kumar Lyrics: Narendra Sharma
Preet	Ram Daryani	Snehprabha, Chandra Mohan, Nazir, Swarnalata, Pahari Sanyal, Gope, Gulab	Romance Drama	Music: Bulo C. Rani; Lyrics: D. N. Madhok
Rahat	Ramniklal Desai	Sardar Akhtar, P. Jairaj, Indira, V. Kumtekar, Hari Shivdasani, Kanhaiyalal	Social	Music: S. Dutt; Lyrics: Pandit Phani
Ragini	Shankar Mehta	Najamul Hasan, Smriti, Pran, Sajjan, Baij Sharma, Mumtaz, Aruna	Social	Music: Amarnath
Raj Laxmi	P. Mitra	Kananbala, Jahar Ganguly, Chhabi Biswas, Purnima, Iftekhar, Natwar	Social	Music: Robin Chatterjee, Dhiren Mitra; Lyrics: Suresh Chaudhari
Ramayani	S. Badami	Nargis, Chandra Mohan, Pahari Sanyal, Kanhaiyalal, Prabha, Rose, Amirbai Karnataki	Social	Music: S. N. Tripathi; Lyrics: Bekal
Ratnavali	Surendra Desai	Surendra, Maya, Ratnamala, Usha Mantri, Leela Mishra, K. N. Singh, Nand Kishore		Music: Gobind Ram; Lyrics: Rammurti Chaturvedi

== S-Z ==
Title	Director	Cast	Genre	Notes
Samrat Chandragupta	Jayant Desai	Ishwarlal, Suraiya, Sulochana Chatterjee, Mubarak, Nayampally, Renuka Devi	Epic Historical	Music: C. Ramchandra; Lyrics: Madhur
Sanyasi	A. R. Kardar	Shamim, Amar, Shyam Sunder, Ghulam Mohammed, Naseem Jr	Social	Music: Naushad; Lyrics: Buddhichandra Agrawal Madhur
Sawan	Dwarka Khosla	Motilal, Shanta Apte, Sushil Sahu, Chandraprabha, Kayam Ali, Pratima Devi	Social	Music: C. Ramchandra; Lyrics: I. C. Kapoor
Sharbati Ankhen	Ramchandra Thakur	Vanmala, Ishwarlal, Rajkumari, Sumati Gupte, Firoze Dastur, Agha, Aftab, Harish	Social	Music: Firoz Nizami; Lyrics:
Shirin Farhad	Prahlad Dutt	Zahur Shah, Ragini, Jayant, Ghulam Mohammed, Gyani	Legend Romance	Music: Pandit Amarnath, Rasheed Atre; Lyrics: D. N. Madhok
Shri Krishnarjun Yudh	Mohan Sinha	Prithviraj Kapoor, Shobhana Samarth, Shahu Modak, Trilok Kapoor, Menaka Devi, Kanhaiyalal, Rattan Bai	Religious	Music: Jagannath Prakash; Lyrics: Safdar Aah, Yashodanandan Joshi
Swarg Se Sundar Desh Hamara	Debaki Bose	Biman Bannerjee, Kamal Mitra, Padma Devi	Social	Music: Debaki Bose; Lyrics:
Tadbir	Jayant Desai	K. L. Saigal, Suraiya, Mubarak, Rehana, Salvi, Rewashankar, Shashi Kapoor, Shalini	Social Romantic Drama	Music: Lal Mohammed; Lyrics: Swami Ramanand Saraswati
Taramati	Raja Nene	Shobhana Samarth, Anant Marathe, Devaskar, Saroj Borkar, Paresh Banerjee, Kanhaiyalal, Baby Shakuntala	Mythology	Music: Ramchandra Pal, Keshavrao Bhole; Lyrics: Mukhram Sharma Ashant
Veer Kunal	Kishore Sahu	Shobhna Samarth, Kishore Sahu, Durga Khote, Mubarak, Moni Chatterjee, Vasantrao Pehalwan, Maya Banerji	Historical Drama	Music: Khan Mastana; Lyrics: Neelkanth Tiwari, Ambikesh Kuntal, Pandit Madhur
Wasiyatnama	Soumyen Mukherjee	Bharati Devi, Ahindra Choudhury, Sumitra, Hiralal, Devi Mukherjee, Tulsi Chakraborty	Social	Music: R. C. Boral; Lyrics: Zaakir Hussain
Vikramaditya	Vijay Bhatt	Prithviraj Kapoor, Prem Adib, Ranjana, Baburao Pendharkar, Bhagwandas, Ratnamala, Jilloo	Historical Drama	Music: Shanker Rao Vyas; Lyrics: Ramesh Gupta
Yateem	Zia Sarhadi	Suraiya, Yakub, E. Billimoria, Chandraprabha, Noor Mohammed Charlie, Uday Kumar, Bhudo Advani, David, Lalita Pawar	Social Drama	Music: Khurshid Anwar; Lyrics: Zia Sarhadi
Zeenat	Shaukat Hussain Rizvi	Noor Jehan, Yakub, Karan Dewan, Dixit, Majid, Himalayawala, Salim Raza, Bibbo, Shah Nawaz, Shashikala, Nazeer, Aga, Jilloo	Social Family Drama	Music: Meer Saheb, Hafiz Khan Lyrics: Shewan Rizvi, Nakshab Jarchvi, Anjum Pilibhiti, Maharul Qadre
Zid	H. S. Rawail	Ramola, Ramesh Sinha, Manorama, Balkrishna, Sunder, Zahur Shah, Hiralal	Social	Music: G. A. Chisti; Lyrics: Shanti Swaroop Madhukar, G A Chishti
