= Karan Dewan =

Indian actor

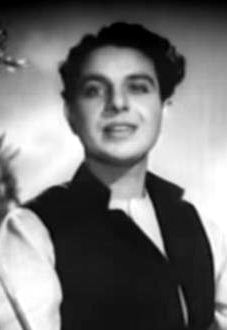
- Karan Diwan in Rattan 1944 film.
- Born: Dewan Karan Chopra; 6 November 1917; Gujranwala, Punjab, British India
- Died: 2 August 1979 (aged 61); Bombay, Maharashtra, India
- Occupation: Actor
- Years active: 1939–1979
- Spouse: Manju (actress) (m. 1944)

Karan Dewan (born Dewan Karan Chopra; 6 November 1917 – 2 August 1979) was an Indian cinema actor in Hindi film industry. He worked in over seventy films from 1939 to 1979. He started as a journalist while still in college, editing a film-based magazine in Urdu. His brother was the film producer and director Jaimani Dewan.

His decisive film was Rattan (1944), which was produced by his brother Jaimini Diwan, and this movie turned out to be the biggest hit of 1944. He also sang songs in this movie under music director Naushad, and his song "Jab Tum Hi Chale Pardes" became popular. He sang in films such as Piya Ghar Aaja (1947), Mitti Ke Khiloune (1948) and Lahore (1949). His other important films were Zeenat (1945), Dahej, Pardes (both 1950), Bahar (1951) and Teen Batti Char Raasta (1953). Known as a "jubilee star", about twenty of his films are stated to have been jubilee (twenty-five weeks or more) hits.

Dewan married co-actress Manju in 1944 following the release of Rattan, in which she had a character role. By 1966, he was working as a casting agent for the film unit of Maya (1966). He continued to work in the 1960s and 1970s playing supporting parts in films such as Apna Ghar (1960), Shaheed (1965), Jeene Ki Raah (1969) and Nadaan (1971), with the last film in which he was credited being Sohanlal Kanwar's Atmaram (1979).

== Early life ==
Dewan Karan Chopra, youngest of three brothers was born on 6 November 1917, at Gujranwala, Punjab (now in Pakistan), British India. He studied in Lahore, where he became interested in journalism and started editing a film magazine in Urdu, Jagat Lakshmi. One of the local distributors he met was Tarachand Barjatya, who was then the Manager of Chandanmal Inder Kumar's distribution office at Lahore. Through his connection with Barjatya he landed in Calcutta, and in 1939, made his acting debut as Puran in the Punjabi language feature film Puran Bhagat (1939).

== Career ==
=== 1940s ===
Meena Kumari and Karan Dewan in Piya Ghar Aja (1948)

Karan Dewan in Mitti Ke Khiloune (1948)

Dewan started his film career with the role of Puran in Puran Bhagat in Punjabi in 1939 in Calcutta. It was produced by Raisaheb Sukhlal Karnani and directed by Roop K. Shorey's father R. L. Shorey. His second film Mera Maahi (1941) was also a Punjabi film, directed by Shankar Mehta at Lahore and starring Ragini and Manorama. This was the movie in which he sang songs for the first time in the movies under the baton of legendary music director Shyam Sunder. Later, in Rattan, he sang for the first time in Hindi movies for Naushad. B. R. Chopra, then working as a film journalist in Lahore, helped Karan Dewan to get in touch with Devika Rani, who invited Dewan to come to Bombay. When this did not help Dewan get films, he taught "Urdu pronunciation to actors and actresses".

In 1944, Karan Dewan acted in Rattan, a musical romantic drama, directed by M. Sadiq, which became one of the most popular films of that year. "A tremendous hit", it paired Dewan with Swaranlata. The music director was Naushad, who gave a break to all the singers in the film; Zohrabai Ambalewali, Amirbai Karnataki, Rajkumari Dubey, Tun Tun (as Uma Devi) and including Dewan himself. The songs of the film became popular. The song "Saawan Ke Baadalon" (O Monsoon Clouds), sung by Dewan and Zohrabai Ambalewali, and picturised on Dewan and Swarnalata, became famous as the pair's "signature" song. Gaali (1944) was a social film, written and directed by Rama Chowdhary, for producer Nanubhai Desai, under his N. R. Desai Productions banner. It co-starred Dewan with Manjula and Yakub. The film was stated to have been a commercial success at the box office.

In 1945, Bhai Jan was a successful Muslim social family melodrama, which starred Dewan with Noor Jehan, Shah Nawaz, Meena Shorey and Anees Khatoon. The music was composed by Shyam Sunder. The film was a debut from a small production company called United Films, and was praised for quality and content. Another Muslim social, which was a big success the same year, especially for its leading lady Noor Jehan, was Zeenat. Directed by Shaukat Hussain Rizvi, it had music by Mir Saheb with several popular songs sung by Noor Jehan. In 1947, Nargis, Begum Para and Dewan starred in Mehndi, directed by S. Faizal.

1948 had Dewan acting in films such as Phir Bhi Apna Hai, Chand Chakori with Swaranlata, and Piya Ghar Aaja with Meena Kumari. Piya Ghar Aaja was a social film directed by Prahlad Dutt for Ranjit Movietone. It co-starred Dewan with Meena Kumari, Aga Jan and S. N. Tripathi, with music composed by Bulo C Rani. The film was stated to be a "clean picture from Ranjit" free from "cheapness and vulgarity". Meena Kumari, who was then working in her second film as a lead, was praised for her acting. Chaman (Garden, 1948), the first post-Partition Punjabi film in India, directed by Roop Shorey, and starring Karan Dewan, Meena Shorey and Kuldip Kaur, became a major hit. The "melodious" music by composer Vinod became "instantly popular".

Duniya (1949), directed by S. F. Hasnain, under the Fazli Brothers banner, had music by C. Ramchandra and starred Suraiya with Karan Dewan, Yakub, and Shakila. Lahore (1949), a film based on the effect partition had on people, had Dewan co-star with Nargis. It was produced by his brother Jaimani Dewan.

=== 1950s ===
In 1950, Dewan acted in six films, three of which were with M. Sadiq. Anmol Ratan (Rare Jewel), directed by M. Sadiq, was produced by Jaimini Dewan. It co-starred Meena Shorey (as Meena) and Nirmala. The film had music composed by Vinod, who used Talat Mehmood for his first Hindi film venture. However, since Arzoo (1950), a film in which music was composed by Anil Biswas was released earlier, the first Talat song became "Ae Dil Mujhe Aisi" from Arzoo. Pardes, a silver jubilee hit, directed by Sadiq, had Madhubala and Rehman in a social family drama with music by Ghulam Mohammed. Sabak directed by Sadiq for his own Sadiq Productions, starred Dewan with Munawwar Sultana and Shyama; the music was by Alla Rakha.

Dahej (1950) was a melodrama about the evils of the dowry system. It was directed by V. Shantaram for his Rajkamal Kalamandir. This was the first of two films Dewan worked in for Shantaram. The cast included Prithviraj Kapoor, Karan Dewan and Jayshree, with music by Vasant Desai.

In 1951, Karan was cast in the box office success Bahar, which had Vyjayantimala acting in her debut Hindi film. It was directed by M. V. Raman for AVM Productions. The music was composed by S. D. Burman in association with N. Dutta. The film's success in Vyjayantimala's words made her a "national star overnight".

In 1953, Dewan acted in his second film with Shantaram; Teen Batti Char Raasta. A social family comedy-drama on national integration, it starred Dewan with Dewan Sharar, Sandhya and Shashikala. The music was composed by Shivram Krishna. Aag Ka Dariya was a 1953 film directed by Roop K. Shorey for Shorey Films. It starred Prithviraj Kapoor with Meena Shorey, Johnny Walker and Dewan.

1955 was a busy year with eight films. The directors he worked with that year ranged from Om Prakash; Duniya Gol Hai, Shakti Samanta; Bahu, Roop K. Shorey; Jalwa, Dhirubhai Desai; Oonchi Haveli. M. Sadiq's rare comedy venture; Musafirkhana (Rest House) was a social comedy about three men from different places, who meet up in Bombay. Dewan, Om Prakash and Johnny Walker played the three characters. Produced by Sadiq Productions, it had music by O. P. Nayyar.

In 1956, Dewan acted in another production from M. Sadiq; Chhoo Mantar (Hocus Pocus), starring opposite Shyama, Anita Guha and Johnny Walker. The music was composed by O. P. Nayyar. Chandan in 1958, a family melodrama, was directed by M. V. Raman for Dossi films. The cast included Nutan, Mala Sinha, Kishore Kumar and Johnny Walker, with popular songs such as "Aankh Milane Ke Liye", sung by Geeta Dutt.

=== 1960s–1970s ===
With Apna Ghar in 1960, Dewan was relegated to playing supporting characters. The film was directed by Ram Pahwa and had Prem Nath, Shyama and Nanda in main roles. The music director was Ravi. Some of his important films during this period included Shaheed (1965), Aamne Samne (1967), Jeene Ki Raah (1969), Maa Aur Mamta (1970), Nadaan (1971), Shehzada (1972), Jalte Badan (1973), Kala Sona (1975), Bhanwar (1976) and Atmaram (1979).

== Personal life ==
Dewan married actress-singer Manju, who had earlier worked in Aadmi and its (original) Marathi version Manoos in 1939, in a character role. She worked for six years in films, notably a small but beautiful movie made by Motilal named Chhoti Chhoti Baatein. After acting in Dewan's most famous film Rattan, the two got married and she stopped working. Dewan and Manju have five daughters and two sons. Dewan died on 2 August 1979, in Mumbai, Maharashtra.

== Partial Filmography ==
List:

Year	Film	Role	Director	Co-stars	Composer	Studio/Producer
1939	Puran Bhagat (Punjabi)	Puran	Roshan Lal Shorey		Dhummi Khan	Raisaheb Sukhlal Karnani
1941	Mera Mahi (Punjabi)		Shankar Mehta	Ragini, Manorama	Shyam Sunder	
1942	Tamanna	Anupam	Phani Majumdar	Leela Desai, Paidi Jairaj, Nargis, Suraiya	K. C. Dey	Laxmi Productions
1942	Shobha		Kumarsen Samarth	Shobhna Samarth, Shahu Modak, Mubarak	Vasant Desai	Wadia Movietone
1943	School Master		Chimanla Muljibhoy Luhar	Maya Banerjee, Kaushalya, Jeevan	Ninu Majumdar	Sun Art Pictures
1943	Aadab Arz		Virendra Chimanlal Desai	Nalini Jaywant, Sulochana Chatterjee	Gyan Dutt	Amar Pictures
1944	Ghar Ki Shobha		Harshadrai Mehta	Swarnalata, Jagdish Sethi, Yashodhra Katju	Allah Rakha Qureshi	Magnet Pictures
1944	Rattan	Govind	M. Sadiq	Swarnalata, Wasti, Manju	Naushad Ali	Jaimani Dewan Productions
1944	Gaali	Tilak	Rama Chowdhury	Nirmala, Yakub, Kanhaiyalal	Sajjad Hussain	N. R. Desai Productions
1945	Bhai Jaan		S. Khalil	Noor Jehan, Meena Shorey	Shyam Sunder	United Films
1945	Zeenat	Akhtar Hussain	Shaukat Hussain Rizvi	Noor Jehan, Yakub, Bibbo	Mir Saheb	Eastern Pictures
1946	Phir Bhi Apna Hai		Raja Nene	Nalini Jaywant, Sunalini Devi, Saroj Borkar	Ramchandra Pal	Venus Pictures
1947	Do Dil		Jagdish Sethi	Motilal, Suraiya, Gulab	Govind Ram	Jamuna Productions
1947	Piya Ghar Aaja		Prahlad Dutt	Meena Kumari, Agha	Bulo C. Rani	Ranjit Movietone
1947	Krishna Sudama		R. Bajaj	Balakram, Dulari	Shyam Babu Pathak	National Artists
1947	Mehndi		Sibtain Fazli	Nargis, Begum Para, Murad	Ghulam Haider	Fazli Bros
1947	Gaon		Dwarka Khosla	Indu, Ramayan Tiwari	Khemchand Prakash	Jamuna Productions
1948	Chaman (Punjabi)	Chaman	Roop K. Shorey	Meena Shorey, Kuldip Kaur, Om Prakash	Vinod	Jaimini Pictures
1948	Shakti		S. I. Hassan	Suraiya, Mumtaz Ali, Sofia, Cuckoo	Ram Prasad, Azim Baig	Greater Bombay Pictures
1948	Mitti Ke Khiloune		Prahlad Dutt	Nigar Sultana, Nirupa Roy, Dulari	Bulo C. Rani	Ranjit Film Company
1949	Lahore	Chaman	M. L. Anand	Nargis, Kanan Devi, Om Prakash	Shyam Sunder	Jaimani Dewan Production
1949	Duniya		S. F. Hussain	Suraiya, Yakub, Shakila, Bhudo Advani	C. Ramchandra	Fazli Bros
1949	Rakhi		Shanti Kumar	Kamini Kaushal, Kuldip Kaur, Pran, Yashodhara Katju	Husnlal Bhagatram	Prakash
1950	Wafa		Jagatrai Pesumal Advani	Shyam, Nimmi, I. S. Johar, Yakub	Vinod, Bulo C Rani	Goodluck Pictures
1950	Anmol Rattan		M. Sadiq	Meena Shorey, Nirmala, Gope	Vinod	Dewan Productions
1950	Chhoti Bhabhi	Prakash	Shanti Kumar	Nargis, Shyam, Kuldip Kaur, Shyama	Husnlal-Bhagatram	Filmkar
1950	Dahej	Suraj	V. Shantaram	Prithviraj Kapoor, Jayshree, Lalita Pawar	Vasant Desai	Rajkamal Kalamandir
1950	Pardes	Sajan	M. Sadiq	Madhubala, Rehman, Surendra, Cuckoo	Ghulam Mohammed	All India Pictures
1950	Sabak		M. Sadiq	Munawwar Sultana, Mijjan Kumar, Shyama, Om Prakash	A. R. Qureshi	Sadiq Productions
1951	Bhai Ka Pyar		Raja Nene	Nalini Jaywant, Jagdish Sethi, Sunalini Devi	Ramchandra Pal	Charolia Production
1951	Bahar	Ashok alias Vasant Kumar	M. V. Raman	Vyjayantimala, Pandhari Bai, Pran, Om Prakash	S. D. Burman	AVM Productions
1951	Ek Nazar	Dilip "Deepu"	O. P. Dutta	Nalini Jaywant, Gope, Kuldip Kaur, Rehman	S. D. Burman	Kuldip Pictures
1953	Aag Ka Dariya		Roop K. Shorey	Meena Shorey, Prithviraj Kapoor, Shammi	Vinod	Shorey Films
1953	Jalianwala Baag Ki Jyot		Rama S. Chowdhary	Achla Sachdev, David, Kamlesh Kumari, Roopmala	Anil Biswas	Famous Pictures
1953	Teen Batti Char Raasta	Ramesh	V. Shantaram	Sandhya, Shashikala, Nirupa Roy, Smriti Biswas	Shivram Krishna	Rajkamal Kalamandir
1954	Raman		Hiren Bose	Meena Shorey, Purnima, Om Prakash, Cuckoo	Vinod	Metropolitan Films
1954	Guzara		S. M. Yusuf	Jabeen Jalil, Paro	Ghulam Mohammed	Aina Pictures
1954	Laadla		Surya Kumar	Shyama, Agha, Krishna Kumari	Vinod	Verma Films
1955	Duniya Gol Hai		Om Prakash	Anita Guha, Kuldip Kaur, Indu Paul, Om Prakash	C. Ramchandra	New Sai Production
1955	Bahu		Shakti Samanta	Usha Kiran, Shashikala, Johnny Walker, Mehmood Ali, Pran	Hemant Kumar	P. R. Films
1955	Jashan		S. Shamsuddin	Vyjayantimala, Kuldip Kaur, Pran, Johnny Walker	Roshan	National Studios
1955	Jalwa		Roop K. Shorey	Meena Shorey, Begum Para, Hari Shivdasani	Vinod	Shorey Films
1955	Sau Ka Note		Yeshwant Pethkar	Geeta Bali, Begum Para, Krishna Kumari	S. Mohinder	R. S. Films
1955	Musafir Khana	Prakash	M. Sadiq	Shyama, Johnny Walker, Om Prakash, Jayant, Gope	O. P. Nayyar	Sadiq Production
1955	Oonchi Haveli		Dhirubhai Desai	Bhagwan, Lalita Pawar, Nirupa Roy	Shivram Krishna	Sharad Productions
1955	Deewar		I.S. Bali	Munawwar Sultana, Bhagwan, Sheikh Mukhtar	Mohammed Shafi	Indralok Pictures
1956	Chhoo Mantar	Mahesh	M. Sadiq	Shyama, Anita Guha, Johnny Walker	O. P. Nayyar	Sadiq Production
1958	Chandan		M. V. Raman	Nutan, Shyama, Kishore Kumar, Mala Sinha, Pran	Madan Mohan	Dossi Films
1958	Miss 1958		Kuldip Kahar	Suraiya, Madan Puri, Kumari Naaz, Krishna Kumari	N. Dutta	A. K. Movies
1958	Taqdeer		A. S. Arora	Shyama, Asha Mathur, Madan Puri	Dhaniram	Neela Productions
1959	Madhu		Gyan Mukerjee and S. Banerjee	Meena Kumari, Kumkum, Tun Tun	Roshan	Maya Art Pictures
1959	School Master	Ravi	B. R. Panthulu	Kamini Kadam, B. R. Panthulu, Shakila, B. Saroja Devi, Gemini Ganesan	Vasant Desai	A. L. S. Production
1961	Jija ji (Punjabi)		Baldev R. Jhingan	Nishi, Sunder	Sapan-Jagmohan	S. Kirpal
1961	Tanhai		Ram Gabale	Usha Kiran, Purnima	Mohammed Shafi	Padma Production
1962	Raj Nandini		Ramchandra Pal	Ameeta, Nishi, Agha	Ramchandra Pal	Pal Films
1965	Shaheed		S. Ram Sharma	Manoj Kumar, Kamini Kaushal, Indrani Mukherjee	Prem Dhawan	K. P. K. Movies
1966	Daadi Maa	Deenanath	L. V. Prasad	Ashok Kumar, Bina Rai, Durga Khote	Roshan	L. V. Prasad
1967	Aamne Samne	Jeevan	Suraj Prakash	Shashi Kapoor, Sharmila Tagore, Prem Chopra	Kalyanji–Anandji	Suraj Prakash
1969	Jeene Ki Raah	A doctor	L. V. Prasad	Jeetendra, Tanuja, Anjali	Laxmikant–Pyarelal	Prasad Production
1972	Shehzada	Rattan	K. Shankar	Rajesh Khanna, Rakhee Gulzar, Veena	R. D. Burman	Surinder Kapoor
1972	Seeta Aur Geeta	Gupta	Ramesh Sippy	Hema Malini, Sanjeev Kumar, Dharmendra	R. D. Burman	G. P. Sippy
1973	Daag	Dr. Kapoor	Yash Chopra	Rajesh Khanna, Sharmila Tagore, Rakhee Gulzar	Laxmikant-Pyarelal	Yash Raj Films
1976	Bhanwar	A priest	Bhappi Sonie	Randhir Kapoor, Parveen Babi, Kamini Kaushal, Ashok Kumar	R. D. Burman	Nand Mirani, Shyam Keswani
