= Sanyasi (1945 film) =

- Film poster
- Directed by: A. R. Kardar
- Written by: Azm Bazidpuri
- Produced by: A. R. Kardar
- Starring: Shamim Bano; Ghulam Mohammed; Amar; Naseem Jr.
- Cinematography: Dwarkadas Diwecha
- Edited by: M. Moosa
- Music by: Naushad
- Production company: Kardar Productions
- Release date: 1945
- Country: British India
- Language: Hindi

Sanyasi (The Godman) is a 1945 Hindi/Urdu social film directed by A. R. Kardar. Produced under the banner of Kardar Productions, its music director was Naushad with lyrics by Pandit Buddhi Chandra Aggarwal (Pandit Madhur). The actor Ghulam Mohammed, who had acted in Sohrab Modi's Ek Din Ka Sultan the same year, played the title role of Sanyasi.

Actor Mehmood played a small role in the film. The other co-stars were Shamim, Amar, Naseem Jr., Shakir and Shyam Kumar.

== Cast ==
- Shamim Bano as Radha
- Gulam Mohammed as Sanyasi
- Amar as Mohan
- Naseem Jr. as Kiran
- Hasandin as Tulsi
- Shyam Kumar as Chetan
- Shakir as Ramdas
- Mehmood as Banke
- Amir as Chobe

== Crew ==
- Producer: A. R. Kardar
- Director: A. R. Kardar
- Assistant Directors: F. Hussain, Ghatala Fazla, N. J. Kardar
- Story and Dialogues: Azm Bazidpuri
- Studio: Kardar Productions
- Cinematographer: Dwaka Diwecha
- Assistant Cinematographers: Dhanraj, Dadhich, Anwar
- Editing: M. Moosa
- Art Director: Ganga Naik
- Sound: Minoo Katrak
- Sound Assistant: Sitaram
- Production Manager: Mulraj Kapadia
- Still Cameraman: C. Jaggar
- Music Assistant: Gulam Mohammed
- Makeup Assistant: A. Qadir
- Settings Assistant: Jagannath

== Soundtrack ==
The music composer was Naushad and the lyricist was Pandit Madhur. The songs were recorded on the R.C.A. sound label. The songs were sung by Zohrabai Ambalewali, Amar, Shyam Kumar and Naseem Akhtar.

=== Song list ===
#	Title	Singer
1	"Ek Baat Kahun"	Naseem Akhtar
2	"Nainon Mein Krishna Murari Hain"	Zohrabai Ambalewali
3	"Laakhon Sitam Jhelenge Hum"	Zohrabai Ambalewali
4	"O Jaane Wale Matwale"	Zohrabai Ambalewali
5	"Peepal Ki Chaon Tale Main Bhi Miloon"	Zohrabai Ambalewali, Amar
6	"Duniya Chadhaye Phool"	Zohrabai Ambalewali, Amar
7	"Neha Laga Ke Jo"	Zohrabai Ambalewali, Amar
8	"Suno Ji Pyari Koyaliya Bole"	Zohrabai Ambalewali, Amar
9	"Tooti Hui Kishti Ka Bane Kaun Sahara"	Amar
10	"Saanjh Bhayi Ghar Aaya"	Shyam Sunder
