= Sati Vijaya =

- Directed by: K. J. Parmar
- Produced by: K. Productions
- Starring: Kishore Kumar; Ratnamala
- Music by: Shanti Kumar Desai
- Release date: 1948
- Country: India
- Language: Hindi

Sati Vijaya is a 1948 Indian Hindi-language mythological film directed by K. J. Parmar and produced under the banner of K. Productions. Its music was composed by Shanti Kumar Desai. Based on the Ramayana, the film follows Sulochana (played by Ratnamala), who marries Indrajit (played by debutant Kishore Kumar) and seeks to perform sati after he is killed in battle. It premiered on 13 August 1948 at Krishna Talkies, Bombay.

== Plot ==
Ravana (Pt. Ramchandra Shastri), the ruler of Lanka, attempts to expand his dominion by conquering Patala, the subterranean realm. His son Indrajit (Kishore Kumar) leads an expedition to wage war against the ruler of Patala. Reaching the subterranean realm beneath the sea floor, Indrajit encounters the local princess, Sulochana (Ratnamala). She quickly falls in love with him, and following the subjugation of the kingdom, Indrajit marries Sulochana and brings her back to Lanka.

In the meantime, Ravana kidnaps Sita (Parvin) and holds her captive in his palace grounds. Her husband Rama (Suryakant), the exiled prince of Ayodhya, prepares an assault on Lanka to free his wife. Ravana's relative and council—including his elder wife Mandodari (Kanta Kumari), his brother Vibhishana, his son, and Sulochana—implore him to return Sita, but Ravana rejects their pleas. Because of his opposition to Ravana, Vibhishana is exiled from Lanka. He joins Rama's forces and provides strategic intelligence for the campaign against Ravana.

The war unfolds through key episodes of the Ramayana: Hanuman setting fire to Lanka, the building of the causeway over the ocean, and direct warfare between the opposing armies. In the fighting, Lakshmana (S. Chatterjee) slays Indrajit with an arrow.

When news of Indrajit's demise reaches Sulochana, she decides to commit sati. She goes to Rama's camp to ask for her deceased husband's head. Rama respectfully hands it over, and Sulochana ascends the funeral pyre, burning herself alongside Indrajit's head.

== Cast ==
- Kishore Kumar as Indrajit
- Ratnamala as Sulochana
- Pt. Ramchandra Shastri as Ravana
- Suryakant as Rama
- Parvin as Sita
- S. Chatterjee as Lakshmana
- Kanta Kumari as Mandodari
- Cuckoo as apsara (special appearance)

== Music ==
The music for Sati Vijaya was composed by Shanti Kumar Desai, with lyrics by Pandit Taresh. The songs featured vocals by Amirbai Karnataki and Zohrabai Ambalewali.

Unlike his subsequent films, Kishore Kumar did not sing for the film.

== Reception ==
Critic Baburao Patel of Filmindia described Sati Vijaya as a "mythological headache" and Kishore Kumar a "sorry figure who has no life in him". Patel further commented:

"Altogether Sati Vijaya is a dull, lifeless, meaningless, and purposeless picture which gives a headache to the intelligent spectator who is left wondering why such pictures should at all be produced when the industry is wailing over shortage of raw films."
