= Ek Din Ka Sultan =

- Directed by: Sohrab Modi
- Produced by: Sohrab Modi
- Starring: Mehtab; Wasti; Sadiq Ali; Pratima Devi
- Cinematography: Y. D. Sarpotdar
- Music by: Rafiq Ghaznavi; Shanti Kumar Desai; Dattaram V. Gadkar; Walter Kaufmann
- Production company: Minerva Movietone
- Release date: 1945
- Running time: 147 minutes
- Country: India
- Language: Hindi

Ek Din Ka Sultan (King For A Day) is a 1945 Hindi/Urdu historical drama film produced and directed by Sohrab Modi with story by Agha Jani Kashmiri. The production company was Minerva Movietone with cinematography by Y. D. Sarpotdar. The music was composed by Rafiq Ghaznavi, Shanti Kumar Desai and D. Gadkar with lyrics by Wali Saheb. The stars featuring in the film were Mehtab, Wasti, Pratima Devi, Ghulam Hussain and Ghory.

The film was a "minor historical" using a small incident from the time of Emperor Humayun's reign. Gangar cites that Ek Din Ka Sultan was hailed as a "well-directed" film with "some beautiful production values".

== Cast ==
- Sohrab Modi
- Mehtab
- Wasti
- Sadiq Ali
- Ghulam Mohammed
- A. Shah
- Pratima Devi
- Ghory
- Amir Banu
- Shantarin

== Soundtrack ==
The film's music was composed by three music directors, Rafiq Ghaznavi, Shanti Kumar Desai and Dattaram V. Gadkar with the lyrics written by Wali Saheb. Playback singing was provided by Amirbai Karnataki, G. M. Durrani, Zohrabai Ambalewali and Rafiq Ghaznavi.

=== Song list ===
| # | Title | Singer | Composer |
|---|---|---|---|
| 1 | "Meri Banri Ki God Hari" | Zohrabai Ambalewali | D. Gadkar |
| 2 | "Ho Ho Khwaja Ajmeri" | Zohrabai Ambalewali | D. Gadkar |
| 3 | "Saza Naseeb Ne De Di" | Amirbai Karnataki | D. Gadkar |
| 4 | "Kisi Ke Kooche Mein Gardan Kataane Jaate Hain" | G. M. Durrani | Rafiq Ghaznavi |
| 5 | "Garibon Ki Duniya Jahan Se Nirali" | Amirbai Karnataki | Rafiq Ghaznavi |
| 6 | "Hum Bahisht Ke Maalik" | Chorus | Rafiq Ghaznavi |
| 7 | "Unse Jo Sahab Salamat Ho Gayi" | Amirbai Karnataki | Shanti Kumar |
| 8 | "Duniya Hai Ek Kahani" | | Shanti Kumar |
| 9 | "Falak Ke Chand Ka Hamne Jawab Dekh Liya" | G. M. Durrani | Shanti Kumar |
