= Teen Batti Char Raasta =

1953 film by V. Shantaram

- Film poster
- Directed by: V. Shantaram
- Written by: Dewan Sharar
- Produced by: V. Shantaram
- Starring: Sandhya; Karan Dewan; Shashikala; Sheila Ramani
- Cinematography: G. Balakrishna
- Music by: Shivram Krishna
- Production company: Rajkamal Kalamandir
- Release date: 1953
- Running time: 112 minutes
- Country: India
- Language: Hindi

Teen Batti Char Raasta (transl. Three Lights & Four Streets) is a 1953 Hindi-language comedy drama film on national integration directed by V. Shantaram. The film was made under the Rajkamal Kalamandir banner and produced by Shantaram. The story and dialogue were by Diwan Sharar while the cinematography was by G. Balkrishna. With music composed by Shivram Krishna, it had lyrics by Pyare Lal Santoshi. The star cast included Karan Dewan, Sandhya, Shashikala, Nirupa Roy, Sheila Ramani, Dewan Sharar and Lalita Kumari.

The film, which portrays national integration, involved a family, whose patriarch Lala Gulabchand (Diwan Sharar), is a Punjabi married to a woman from Uttar Pradesh. He lives near a crossroads with three lights and four streets. The crossroads is used symbolically as a union of the different states and religions in the country, as mentioned in the film. Their five of six sons then marry girls from five different states in India and the story follows the chaos that ensues. The film had a sub-plot weaved into it in the form of a dark-complexioned girl, Shyama (Sandhya), who is first humiliated by the hero Ramesh (Karan Dewan), and then accepted by him as he falls in love with the "real person".

== Plot ==
Lala Gulabchand, is a Punjabi and his wife is from Uttar Pradesh. They live at the corner of a crossroads with three lights and four roads. He is a firm believer in national unity and has had five of his six sons, each married to a girl from a different state; a Marathi, Sindhi, Bengali, Tamil and a Gujarati. His sixth son Ramesh (Karan Dewan), works in the press and is a writer and an artist. He is a bachelor but falls in love with a woman named Kokila whose singing he hears on the radio. He draws a portrait of Kokila from imagination just listening to her sing. Unbeknownst to him, Kokila, called Shyama, is the dark-complexioned maid who works in their home and is proficient in all the different languages that the wives of the brothers speak and is very efficient at her chores. However, he rejects her as she's dark and Shyama leaves the house despondent. The turmoil the household goes through with the absence of Shyama and a repentant Ramesh finally makes for a happy ending by everyone getting together again.

== Cast ==
=== Female Cast ===
- Sandhya as Shyama / Kokila
- Shashikala as Lalita, Marathi wife
- Nirupa Roy as Kanta, the Gujarati wife
- Sheila Ramani as Kamla, the Sindhi wife
- Smriti Biswas as Sadhona, the Bengali wife
- Meenakshi as Laxmi, the Tamil wife
- Lalita Kumari as Roopa
- Sofy
- Meera

=== Male Cast ===
- Karan Dewan as Ramesh
- Dewan Sharar as Lala Gulabchand
- Parshuram
- Keshavrao Date
- Asit Baran
- Moolchand as share broker
- Vikas
- Surendra
- K. Mohan
- Shankardas Gupta
- Kamal
- Ishwar

== Crew ==
- Director: V. Shantaram
- Producer: V. Shantaram
- Banner: Rajkamal Kalamandir
- Audiography: A. K. Parmar
- Art Direction: D. S. Kale
- Editing: Chintamani Borkar
- Music: Shivram Krishna
- Lyrics: Pyarelal Santoshi
- Background Music: Vasant Desai
- Make-up: Vardam
- Choreographer: Gauri Shankar
- Still Photography: Kirtiwan

== Soundtrack ==
The music director was Shivram Krishna and the lyrics were written by Santoshi. One song in the film was composed by Vasant Desai and he also provided the background music. The singers were Lata Mangeshkar, Asha Bhosle, Zohrabai Ambalewali, Talat Mahmood and S. Balbir. The two songs by Talat, "Ek Do Teen Chaar Paanch" and "Tumse Hai Pyar Mujhe" were picturised on Karan Dewan.

A "multilingual, multicultural song" was shown at different parts in the film. The song had different singers, lyricists, and composers representing the different languages from different states. The song started with the Bengali part "O Re O Poraan Bondhu Re" and its singers were Mangeshkar, Zohrabai, Balbir and others. The music and lyrics for the Bengali part was by Kanu Ghosh; for Tamil, the lyrics and composition was by Natraj; for Sindhi, the composer was Gulshan Sufi with lyrics by Ram Panjwani; for Marathi the music was by Vasant Desai with lyrics by G. D. Madgulkar; for Gujarati, the music and lyrics were by Avinash Vyas; for Punjabi, music was by Shivram Krishna with lyrics by Feroz; the Hindi part had music by Krishna with lyrics by P. L. Santoshi.

=== Songlist ===
#	Title	Singer
1	"Kitna Meetha Hota Hai"	Lata Mangeshkar
2	"Koi Humko Na Dekhe"	Lata Mangeshkar
3	"Apni Ada Par Main Hoon Fida"	Lata Mangeshkar
4	"Ishq Preet Pyar Haan Pyar /Tumse Hai Pyar Mujhe"	Talat Mehmood
5	"Ek Do Teen Chaar Paanch"	Talat Mehmood
6	"O Re O Poraan Bondhu Re"	Lata Mangeshkar, Asha Bhosle, Zohrabai Ambalewali, S.Balbir, Sandhya Mukherjee
7	"Teen Deep Aur Chaar Dishayen"	Lata Mangeshkar, S. Balbir

== Trivia ==
In Mumbai, near the sacred Banganga Tank area on Malabar Hill, past the Birla Balika Vidhya Kendra girls school, is a cross-roads still called "Teen Batti" (Three Lights), which became famous after the release of Shantaram's film Teen Batti Char Raasta.
