= Mela (1948 film) =

1948 film

- Poster
- Directed by: S. U. Sunny
- Written by: Azm Bazidpuri
- Story by: Azm Bazidpuri
- Produced by: S. U. Sunny
- Starring: Dilip Kumar; Nargis; Jeevan
- Cinematography: Fali Mistry
- Edited by: Moosa Mansoor
- Music by: Naushad
- Distributed by: Wadia Movietone
- Release date: 9 April 1948
- Country: India
- Language: Hindi

Mela (1948)

Mela (transl. The Fair) is a 1948 Indian Hindi-language romantic tragedy film. It was produced by and directed by S.U. Sunny for Wadia Movietone. It starred Dilip Kumar, Nargis, Jeevan, Rehman and Nur Jehan. The film's music was composed by Naushad. Mukesh gave playback for Dilip in this film and one of the "Mukesh hits" was "Gaye Ja Geet Milan Ke". Mohammed Rafi's voice was used just once, for the popular song "Ye Zindagi Ke Mele", set in a fairground and picturised on a wandering mendicant at the start of the film. The lyrics of the songs were written by Shakeel Badayuni with story and dialogue by Azam Bazidpuri.

The musical film, set in a village milieu, was a tragic love story involving Manju and Mohan. Manju is married off to a seventy-year-old man, who declares that he didn't realise he was being married to someone so young. After the husband's death, the lovers meet and Manju dies accidentally. Mohan is convicted for her murder, and after spending twenty years in jail, he too falls off the cliff and dies when he follows Manju's spirit.

== Plot ==
Manju (Nargis) lives in the village with her father, a school teacher, and stepmother. Mohan (Dilip Kumar) and Manju have been friends since childhood. The friendship develops into love and they are both excited about their wedding. Mohan decides to go into town to buy jewelry for the marriage. On the way he is robbed and beaten unconscious, landing him in the hospital.

Mehkoo (Jeevan), is a no-good man, retired from the army, who lusts after one of the young village girls. He is influential with Manju's stepmother and, with her by his side, calls the village panchayat. Here, he denounces Mohan as a cad who has run away with a girl, telling them that he won't return for the marriage. Since the wedding day has been fixed, the panchayat agrees with Mehkoo that Manju should get married on the day decided. It finds a supposedly suitable groom for Manju, but he turns out to be a seventy-year-old, sickly man. When he enters the wedding chamber, he agrees that Manju is too young to be his bride. Remorseful, he asks for forgiveness, but pleads with her to take care of his children. Manju takes on the role of the old man's wife. The man dies, with Manju now left as a young widow in charge of the children.

One night in stormy weather, she goes out to meet Mohan, and dies when she falls off a cliff. Mehkoo and other villagers arrive to convict Mohan of murdering Manju. Mohan says nothing in his defense and is sentenced to twenty years' imprisonment. On release from jail, Mohan goes to the same place where Manju had died. He sees her spirit, who beckons him to follow her. As he does, he falls off the cliff edge and dies.

== Cast ==
- Dilip Kumar... Mohan
- Nargis... Manju
- Jeevan... ex-army officer Mehkoo
- Rehman
- Amar
- Roop Kamal
- Allauddin... MasterJi
- Abbas
- Nurjehan
- Chandabai
- Khalil
- Baby Zubeida

== Production ==
The film, produced and directed by S. U. Sunny, was a Wadia Movietone presentation, with J. B. H. Wadia's wife Hila Wadia also listed in the credits as producer ("A Hila Wadia production"). Hila suggested that Jamshed Wadia make a film with music director Naushad, who was at the top of his musical career, having composed music for films like Rattan (1944), Anmol Ghadi (1946) and Shahjehan (1946). Following the success of Mela, Sunny set up his own production company, Sunny Art Productions, where he made films like Babul (1950), Udan Khatola (1955), and Kohinoor (1960).

Dilip Kumar was reportedly unwilling to act in Mela until he reached the studios and heard the opening lines of the song "Mera dil todnewaale", sung by Mukesh and Shamshad Begum. Kumar felt the story line was weak, in his words "absence of meat", and asked the screenwriters to accommodate changes in the script, which they did. As Kumar reports in his autobiography, Dilip Kumar: The Substance and the Shadow, "We had some healthy brainstorming sessions, which helped us to add depth and intensity to the story besides [as well as] logic". He felt the changes were good, both for him and the cast overall.

== Review ==
The film came in for harsh criticism from the editor of Filmindia, Baburao Patel. In the December 1948 issue of the cine-magazine, he compared the "formula" used for the story as a "rehash of Rattan" (1944). His review elaborated a Parsi (Wadia) and Muslim (Bazidpuri) "conspiracy" to "run down the Hindus" by making a "stupid and reactionary" film like Mela. Calling the film a "slander on Hindus" and anti-social, he claimed it to be a film encouraging suicide, a criminal offense (section 309 of the Indian Penal Code). The army was slandered because the film made Mekhoo, an ex-army man, "the most objectionable character in the picture". He found "unbelievable" features in the story, especially the quick arrangement for Manju's wedding without looking for Mohan, and that a seventy-year-old widower remarrying wouldn't know the age of the woman he's going to marry.

Patel commended the film for its "pleasant photography". Patel praised lead-female Nargis, but in her role of mother found her "unconvincing" and "synthetic". Dilip Kumar as the hero "does his job well". For Jeevan, who played Mehkoo: "Jeevan plays Mehkoo and succeeds in creating disgust and revulsion, the two main aspects of his role". Later, Patel lays on more anti-Parsi rhetoric when comparing Mehkoo's sexual assault of a girl, Basanti, to "those of some of the toddy-tight [drunk] Parsis on vacation".

== Release and reception ==
The film was released on 8 October 1948 at Excelsior cinema, Bombay. The music of the film was a main part in the commercial success at the box office, with it being reportedly referred to as Naushad's "Golden jubilee (fifty weeks) Mela". According to Meghnad Desai, a weak story was camouflaged by the "stunning melodies" in Mela and other films.

The reported box office gross for the film according to IBOS was ₹50 lakhs in 1948. The adjusted gross as of 2015 is roughly estimated at ₹340.44 crores.

== Remake ==
Chiranjeevulu (1956), a Telugu language film, was a remake of Mela. In the Telugu version, the hero is turned blind, and the old man who marries Manju is changed to a young bachelor, Dr. Krishna. The film was made under the Vinoda Productions banner, produced by D. L. Narayana (Dronamvajhala Lakshmi Narayana) and directed by Vedantam Raghavayya. The dialogue writer and lyricist was Malladi Ramakrishna Sastry. The film starred N. T. Rama Rao, Jamuna, Gummadi, Peketi Sivaram, C.S.R. Anjaneyulu. For actress Jamuna, it was cited as her "career-best performance"; Peketi Sivaram played the negative role of Mehkoo, originally played by Jeevan. The film "was a box office grosser".

== Soundtrack ==
Composer Naushad had Shamshad Begum singing some memorable songs, in the process getting the "best out of Shamshad" for this film. "Dharti Ko Aakash Pukaare" and "Taqdeer Bani Banke Bigdi" by Shamshad are both notable songs, reportedly showing her growth as a "serious singer". The song "Dharti Ko Aakash Pukaare" was originally put in as a title song, but it became extremely popular, forcing the producers to have the full song added in the film.

Another popular song was the bidai (farewell) number, "Gaaye Jaa Geet Milan Ke" (Sing Songs Of Meeting), sung by Mukesh, at the time of Manju's departure from home after marriage. It was used in the film to show Manju's feelings, her "secret sorrows" that "cannot be voiced but are palpable" through the medium of the song. The song is sung by Mohan (Dilip Kumar) as he's racing home in his bullock cart to meet Manju (Nargis), whereas Manju is leaving for her husband's home.

Mohammed Rafi's popularity as a singer rose with the single song sung by him in Mela, "Ye zindagi ke mele".

Mela had music directed by Naushad with lyrics by Shakeel Badayuni. The singers were Mukesh, Shamshad Begum, Zohrabai Ambalewali and Mohammed Rafi.

=== Song list ===
No.	Title	Singer(s)	Length
1.	"Ye Zindagi Ke Mele, Duniyaa Men Kam Na Honge (Part 1)" (Raga Bhairavi)	Mohammed Rafi	01:37
2.	"Ye Zindagi Ke Mele, Duniyaa Men Kam Na Honge (Part 2)" (Raga Bhairavi)	Mohammed Rafi	03:33
3.	"Gaye Ja Geet Milan Ke Tu Apni Lagan Ke"	Mukesh	02:54
4.	"Phir Aah Dil Se Nikli, Shaayad Wo Ja Rahe Hain"	Zohrabai Ambalewali	02:58
5.	"Dharti Ka Aakash Pukaare (Part 1)"	Shamshad Begum, Mukesh	01:08
6.	"Dharti Ka Aakash Pukaare (Part 2)"	Shamshad Begum, Mukesh	01:36
7.	"Dharti Ka Aakesh Pukaare (Part 3)"	Shamshad Begum	01:21
8.	"Mera Dil Todne Wale Mere Dil Ki Dua Lena"	Shamshad Begum, Mukesh	03:28
9.	"Aayi Sawan Ritu Aayi Sajan Mora Dole Hai Man"	Shamshad Begum, Mukesh	03:26
10.	"Main Bhanwra Tu Hai Phool"	Shamshad Begum, Mukesh	04:18
11.	"Mohan Ki Muraliya Baaje"	Shamshad Begum	03:11
12.	"Taqdeer Bani Ban Kar Bigadi"	Shamshad Begum	03:09
13.	"Pardes Balam Tum Jaaoge"	Shamshad Begum	03:11
14.	"Garibo Par Jo Hoti Hai"	Shamshad Begum	03:17
15.	"Dance Theme"	Instrumental	03:30
Total length:			42:37
