= Parakh =

Parakh (lit. 'test' or 'examine' or 'investigate') may refer to:

- Parakh (1937 film), a 1937 Indian film starring K. Narayan Kale
- Parakh (1944 film), a 1944 Indian film by Sohrab Modi, starring Mehtab and Balwant Singh
- Parakh (1960 film), a 1960 Indian romantic comedy film by Bimal Roy, starring Sadhana and Motilal
- Parakh (1978 film), a 1978 Pakistani Urdu film
- Parakh (1981 film), a 1981 Indian drama film by Vijay Kapoor, starring Simple Kapadia and Vijayendra Ghatge
