= Phir Bhi Apna Hai =

- Ad in Filmindia March 1946
- Directed by: Raja Nene
- Produced by: A. V. Charolia
- Starring: Nalini Jaywant; Karan Dewan; Sunalini Devi; Saroj Borkar
- Music by: Ramchandra Pal
- Production company: Venus Pictures
- Release date: 1946
- Country: India
- Language: Hindi

Phir Bhi Apna Hai (Even Then He's Ours) is a 1946 Indian Hindi-language film. It was released in 1946. The film was directed by Raja Nene for Venus Pictures under the Charolia Productions banner and was produced by A. V. Charolia. Music was composed by Ramchandra Pal with lyrics by Mukhram Sharma Ashant. The cast included Nalini Jaywant, Karan Dewan, Jagdish Sethi, Saroj Borkar, Kusum Deshpande and Vasant Thengdi.

Following her marriage to Virendra Desai, son of Chimanbhai Desai of Sagar Movietone in 1945, Nalini Jaywant had a hiatus of nearly three years from films. Phir Bhi Apna Hai was the only Jaywant film released as it was in making over a long period of time.

== Cast ==
- Nalini Jaywant
- Karan Dewan
- Saroj Borkar
- Jagdish Sethi
- Kusum Deshpande
- Vasant Thengdi
- Paresh Bannerjee
- Sunalini Devi

== Soundtrack ==
Music was composed by Ramchandra Pal with lyrics by Mukhram Sharma Ashant.

=== Song list ===
#	Title
1	"Aaya Teej Ka Tyohar"
2	"Kabhi Na Chhute Haath Hamara"
3	"Kahe Koi Kuch Bhi To"
4	"Mai Hu Panghat Ki Rani (Phir Bhi Apna Hai)"
5	"Radheshyam Radheshyam Main Radha Kahoon"
6	"Mujhe Tumse Hua Pyar"
