= Lachhu Maharaj (musician) =

Laxmi Narayan Singh
- Also known as: Lacchu Maharaj
- Born: Laxmi Narayan Singh; March 9, 1944; Varanasi, Uttar Pradesh, India
- Died: July 28, 2016 (aged 72) Varanasi, Uttar Pradesh, India
- Genres: Hindustani classical music
- Occupation: Musician
- Instrument: Tabla

Laxmi Narayan Singh (16 October 1944 - 28 July 2016) known professionally as Lachhu Maharaj was an Indian Tabla Player of Banaras Gharana. Maharaj was born on 16 October 1944 to Vasudev Narayan Singh. His sister is Nirmala Devi, mother of Bollywood actor Govind Arun Ahuja. He had given many professional tabla performances performed all over the world. He was featured in films. He was nominated for Padma Shri but refused to accept it he felt that the appreciations of his audience was enough for him.

== Death ==
Maharaj Singh died on 28 July 2016, at the age of 71. He was cremated in Manikarnika Ghat in Varanasi, in the Indian state of Uttar Pradesh.

Condolences were received from Indian Prime Minister, Narendra Modi. Politician Sonia Gandhi commented that "His contributions to classical as well as the popular film genre would forever inspire artistes in the years to come."

Then Chief Minister of Uttar Pradesh, Akhilesh Yadav, said in his condolence message that 'Lacchu Maharaj popularized tabla playing internationally with his talented performances, and his death was a huge loss'.

Classical singer Girija Devi said it was an irreparable loss, and Maharaj knew the nuances of tabla like no other artist.

On 16 October 2018, Google dedicated a doodle to Lachhu Maharaj on his 74th birthday anniversary.

== Personal life ==
He was married to the renowned Kathak dancer Annapurna Mishra Singh, with whom he had a daughter, Rachna. Following Annapurna's death, he married a Swiss woman named Teena, with whom he had a daughter named Narayani.
