= Zeenat (1945 film) =

1945 film

- Directed by: Shaukat Hussain Rizvi
- Written by: Wajahat Mirza
- Screenplay by: Khadim Mohy-ud-din
- Story by: Wajahat Mirza
- Produced by: Shirazali Hakim; Ramzanali S. Lakhani
- Starring: Noor Jehan; Yakub; Karan Dewan; Himalayawala; Nasseem
- Cinematography: P. Isaac
- Edited by: Mohsin T. Bangriwal; M. P. Kulkarni; D. N. Patel
- Music by: Meer Saheb; Hafiz Khan; Rafiq Ghaznavi (Background Music)
- Production company: Eastern Pictures
- Distributed by: Salma Talkie Distributors
- Release date: 16 November 1945
- Running time: 178 minutes
- Country: India
- Language: Hindustani

Zeenat is a 1945 Indian Muslim social melodrama film directed by Syed Shaukat Hussain Rizvi and starring Noor Jehan, Yakub, Majid, Himalayawala, and Karan Dewan.

It was produced by Shirazali Hakim and Ramzanali S. Lakhani. The film's story and dialogue was written by Wajahat Mirza Changezi. The music was composed by Meer Saheb and Hafiz Khan while the background music was provided by Rafiq Ghaznavi.

It is the story of a young girl who loses her husband a few days after her wedding as a result of a fall from a horse but not before they have spent a night together unbeknownst to others, leaving her pregnant. Her travails following the death of her husband and the music of the film made it the highest grossing Indian film of 1945. Zeenat was the highest-grossing movie of the year 1945 and is known for its famous qawwali "Aahen Na Bharin Shikwe Na Kiye".

== Story ==
Zeenat (Noor Jehan) is marrying the youngest of the Hussain brothers, Sharafat. During Rukhsati (departure of the bride) the horse on which the bridegroom Sharafat is sitting shies away from the sound of firecrackers, causing the groom to fall and sustain critical head injuries. The groom is put in a room with his middle brother Liaqat Hussain (Yakub) but somehow manages to spend that night with Zeenat without anyone knowing. The only person to see him there is Liaqat who leads a wandering life and only visits the house because of his younger brother. Next day Sharafat suffers a paralytic attack from cerebral haemorrhage and exhaustion, but not before he writes about the night he passed with his new bride in his diary. He finally succumbs to his injuries leaving Zeenat a young and helpless widow. Liaqat leaves the house following his younger brother's death as now there is no reason for him to stay there. He takes Sharafat's diary with him.

When it is found that Zeenat is pregnant no one believes her story of being with her husband on their wedding night. She is asked to leave the house by the oldest Hussain brother who doubts her morality. She gives birth to a daughter who she leaves on her husband's grave following disturbing comments by people and tries to commit suicide. However, the cry of her child, Sayida, makes her return to the grave only to find her missing.

The child has been picked up by Liaqat who regularly visits his brother's grave. He has no idea of the child's parents but decides to look after her to the extent of giving up his idle life and taking up a job in order to stay put in one place. A friend of his, Hakim Sahib, suggests that Yakub give the child to him and his wife as they've been childless even after fifteen years of marriage. Liaqat agrees. Zeenat sees the child in a pram in the park and insists it's her child. Hakim Sahib calls Liaqat to settle the issue. Zeenat recognises Liaqat and though he finds her face familiar he cannot remember her. Faced with Liaqat and her past history Zeenat denies that the baby is hers but stays on in the house as an ayah (domestic help) in order to be close to her daughter.

Fifteen years later Sayida (Nasseem) is a young girl in love with Akhtar Hussain (Karan Dewan), who comes to study Persian from her teacher father, Hakim Sahib. Akhtar is also the son of Liaqat and Sharafat's older brother. Sayida's friend Jamila has a brother, Afzal (Himalayawala) who is also enchanted by Sayida. Soon, a marriage is fixed between Akhtar and Sayida. During the wedding Hakim and his wife find out about Zeenat being the real mother of Sayida and she tells them the father's name. At the wedding the bridegroom's family discover that Sayida is not Hakim's real daughter. However they agree to continue with the wedding but the Qazi needs to know the name of the girl's father. By the time Liaqat shows the family Sharafat's diary as proof of Zeenat's purity and morality, she has consumed poison. She lives just long enough to hear her daughter call her ‘Mother’.

== Cast ==
Male Cast

- Yakoob as Liyaqat Hussain
- Karan Diwan as Akhtar Hussain
- Dixit as Hakim
- Majeed as Sharafat Hussain
- Himalayawala as Afzal, Liyaqat's Brother
- Salim Raza
- Laddan
- Aga
- Sainger
- Nazeer
- Amir
- Munee Aga as Young Akhtar
- Shah Nawaz

Female Cast

- Noor Jehan as Zeenat
- Nasseem as Sahida
- Shanta Rin as Hakim's Wife
- Bibboo as Jamila, Akhtar's Sister
- Lila Mishra as Liyaqat's Mom
- Chanda Bai
- Amir Banoo
- Jilloobai

== Music ==
The film credits two music directors: Meer Sahib and Hafiz Khan. There were four lyricists: Nakshab Jarchvi, Mahir Ul Qadri, Shewan Rizvi, Anjum Pilibhiti. However the qawwali ‘Aahein Na Bharin’ was written by Nakshab.

Number	Song	Singer	Composer
1.	"Naacho Sitaro Naacho"	Noor Jehan	Hafiz Khan
2.	"Dulhan Ban Jao"	Zohrabai Ambalewali, Kalyani and Menaka	Meer Saheb and Hafiz Khan
3.	"Bulbulo Mat Ro Yahaan"	Noor Jehan	Hafiz Khan
4.	"Haaye Re Duniya Jhoothon Ka Durbar"	Mohd. Rafi	Meer Saheb, Hafiz Khan
5.	"Aandhiyan Gham Ki Yun Chali"	Noor Jehan	Hafiz Khan
6.	"Aaja Ri Aa Nindiya"	Noor Jehan	Hafiz Khan
7.	"Sakhi Aaya Saawan Aaya"	Zohrabai, Amirbai and Kalyani	Meer Saheb, Hafiz Khan
8.	"Aahein Na Bhari Shikwe Na Kiye"	Zohrabai, Kalyani and Noor Jehan	Meer Saheb, Hafiz Khan

=== Qawwali ===
The qawwali "Aahein Na Bhari Shikve Na Kiye" sung by Zohrabai Ambalewali, Noor Jehan, and Kalyani was very popular then and remains so even today. It was the first all-female qawwali and picturised on the then very young Shashikala, Baby Khurshid, Rehana, Zohrabai, Zebunnissa, Yasmin and the singer Kalyani herself. The qawwali was written by Nakhshab Jarchavi and music was composed by Meer Saheb and Hafiz Khan.
