= Qaidi (1940 film) =

- Release date: 1940
- Country: India
- Language: Hindi

Qaidi (meaning The Prisoner) is a Bollywood film directed by S.F. Hasnain. It was released in 1940. It stars Madhuri and Mehtab and Ramola Devi.
