= Ismat (film) =

- Directed by: Sibtain Fazli
- Produced by: Fazli Brothers Films
- Starring: Nargis; Mehtab
- Release date: 1944
- Country: India
- Language: Hindi

Ismat is a 1944 Indian Hindi-language film directed by Sibtain Fazli, and produced under the banner of Fazli Brothers Films. It starred Nargis and Mehtab.

Ismat was one of the earliest films of Nargis' career. Despite her lack of experience, she was paid the same amount as Mehtab, then an established film star, as both the actresses had an equal screen time. Ismat was a box office success, although according to Nargis' biographer T. J. S. George, it failed to leave any positive impact on the actress' career.
