= Gaali =

1944 film

- Directed by: Rama Chowdhary
- Written by: Rama Chowdhary
- Produced by: N. R. Desai
- Starring: Karan Dewan; Nirmala; Yakub; Kanhaiyalal
- Music by: Sajjad Hussain
- Production company: N. R. Desai Productions
- Release date: 1944
- Country: India
- Language: Hindi

Gaali is a Bollywood film. It was released in 1944.

A social film, its theme dealt with injustice to women. The music was by Sajjad Hussain with lyrics by Pandit Indra. It starred Karan Dewan, Nirmala, Manjula, and Yakub.

== Cast ==
The cast of the film:

- Karan Dewan
- Nirmala
- Yakub
- Kanhaiyalal
- Sunalini Devi
- Jilloo
