= Shanti Kumar Desai =

Shanti Kumar Desai (3 March 1908 – 6 January 1986) also credited as Shanti Kumar, was an Indian music director who gave music to Hindi films between 1934 -1964.

== Personal life ==
He was born to a Gujarati family in Amreli in Saurashtra, Bombay Presidency, India. His mother is Kunwarben and father is Shri Pritamlal Desai. He married Shantagauri Kanakiya. He died on 6 January 1986, survived by five children, 2 sons and 3 daughters and grandchildren.

== Career ==
He learned music early and gave concerts to the royal families of that time. During the 3rd decade of the 20th century, he came to Mumbai and took a job of a broadcaster in His Master's Voice. He was exposed to composition and music arrangement for Indian Cinema. He became a disciple of Shri Aman Ali Khan.

Initially he gave music to a theater group in Bhangwadi area of Mumbai. He got his first break in the movie Navbharat from Victory Pictures in 1934. He worked with veteran singers of that time including Johrabai Ambawali, Rajkumari, Ameerbai Karnataki, Sardar Akhtar and Pinakin Shah. He composed for around 40 movies.

He was also known as a harmonium player. In that era, music used harmonium and tabla only.

== Filmography ==
Film	Year
Nav Bharat	1934
Taqdeer	1935
Qatil Katar	1935
Magic Horse	1935
Zan Mureed	1936
Jawahar - e - hind	1937
Punarjanam	1938
Sharif Daku	1938
Ghunghatwali	1938
Devbala	1938
Chhote Sarkar	1938
Imandar	1939
Fankdo Fituri (Gujarati)	1939
Suhagan	1940
Pyaar	1940
Anjam	1940
Jadu Nagri	1940
Prabhat	1941
Torpedo	1941
Meri Khwahish	1941
Desire	1941
Meri Duniya	1942
Swapna	1942
Naukar	1943
Fashion	1943
Duhai	1943
Collegian	1944
Kismatwala	1944
Dhanwan	1946
Shah - E - Misar	1946
Ek Din Ka Sultan	1945
Gaurav	1947
Ghar Ki Bahu	1947
Amar Asha	1947
Sati Vijaya	1948
Ek Din Ka Sultan	1949
Lav Kush	1951
Tere Dwar Khade Bhagwan	1964
