= Bhai Jaan =

1945 film

Bhai Jaan (1945)
- Directed by: S. Khalil
- Written by: Chugtai; Khalil
- Produced by: United Films
- Starring: Noor Jehan; Karan Dewan; Anees Khatoon; Meena Shorey
- Cinematography: B. Jagirdar
- Music by: Shyamsunder
- Release date: 1945
- Country: India
- Language: Hindi

Bhai Jaan is a 1945 Bollywood film. It was released on 15 September 1945 in Bombay. Directed by Syed Khalil. The actors were Karan Dewan, Noor Jehan, Anees Khatoon, Meena Shorey, Shah Nawaz, Ansari and Nazir. It was a family drama, made under the banner of United Films. The print has been lost now.

The film a Muslim social family drama, is about two brothers (Shah Nawaz and Karan Dewan) in love with a dancing girl (Noor Jehan), which disrupts their family life. It leads to the girl consuming poison in order to maintain the respectability of the brothers' family name.

== Cast ==
- Karan Dewan
- Noor Jehan
- Anees Khatoon
- Meena Shorey
- Shah Nawaz
- Ansari
- Nazir

== Soundtrack ==
The music director was Shyamsunder with lyrics by Partau Lakhnavi. The singers were Noor Jehan, Zeenat Begum and had Shiv Dayal Batish for "Aa Hosh Mein Aa".

=== Songlist ===
#	Title	Singer
1	"Aa Hosh Mein Deewanay Hosh Mein Aa"	Shiv Dayal Batish
2	"Begum Jaaniyan Ki Goad Bhari"	Chorus
3	"Aaja Bedardi Aaja"	Zeenat Begum
4	"Ae Baade Saba Kucch Tunay Suna"	Noor Jehan
5	"Chupke Se Dil Mein Aa Basse"	Noor Jehan
6	"Jinke Kadam Se Ghar Tha Ghar"	Zeenat Begum
7	"Kamli Wale Mujhe Kamli Mein Le Le"	
8	"Maalik Mere Maabood"	
9	"Rutt Yeh Suhaani Aa Gaii"	Chorus
