= Samay Bada Balwan =

- Directed by: Sohrab Modi
- Written by: Chunilal Madia
- Produced by: Sohrab Modi
- Starring: Sohrab Modi; Mehtab; Aruna Irani; Sailesh Kumar; Shahida
- Music by: Usha Khanna
- Production company: Minerva Movietone
- Release date: 1969
- Running time: 147 minutes
- Country: India
- Language: Hindi

Samay Bada Balwan is a 1969 Hindi social moral drama film produced and directed by Sohrab Modi. Modi had sold his studio a year earlier but tried to revive the Minerva Movietone banner by producing this film. The music director was Usha Khanna with lyrics written by D. N. Madhok. This was the only film in which Modi used Usha Khanna as a music composer. Mehtab acted together again with Modi in Samay Bada Balwan in a supporting role as Modi's wife. This was to be the last acting role of her career. The film starred Sohrab Modi, Mehtab, Aruna Irani, Sailesh Kumar, Shahida, David, and Helen.

The film was a moralistic drama about valuing relationships irrespective of the hardships people face. The story follows the reversal of fortunes Uttam (Sohrab Modi) faces, first the failure in his business, and then the improvement again, showcasing people's response to him along the way.

== Plot ==
Uttam (Sohrab Modi) is a rich cotton merchant who lives in a mansion with his wife Damyanti (Mehtab). Uttam's younger brother Ram (Sailesh Kumar), who is engaged to Seth Dhanichand’s (Wasti) elder daughter Gauri (Shahida), also lives with them. Damyanti's opportunistic brother, Dwarkadas (K. N. Singh) is in partnership with Uttam. Uttam loses his merchandise in a fire and becomes financially destitute, though he continues to live in the big mansion. Ram's engagement is called off by Dhanichand. Dwarkadas breaks off his partnership with Uttam and gets his son engaged to Dhanichand's younger daughter. Uttam attends the engagement ceremony, but is humiliated and accused of stealing money. He is also beaten up on his way home by some thugs sent by Dwarkadas. The film then follows Uttam's slow rise back again financially, while Dhanichand and Dwarkadas now face poverty.

== Cast ==
- Sohrab Modi as Uttam
- Mehtab as Damyanti, Uttam's wife
- Sailesh Kumar as Ram, Uttam's brother
- K. N. Singh as Dwarkadas, Damyanti's brother
- Shahida as Gauri
- Wasti as Seth Dhanichand
- Aruna Irani
- Helen
- David
- Monto

== Soundtrack ==
The playback singers were Mohammed Rafi, Asha Bhosle, Krishna Kalle, Usha Khanna, Hemlata with lyrics by D. N. Madhok and soundtrack composed by Usha Khanna. The notable songs were "Teri Tasveer Se Aankhen Meri Kyun Hatati Nahin" sung by Mohammed Rafi and Asha Bhosle, and "Bhoole Afsane Phir Se Yaad Aaye" sung by Mohammed Rafi.

=== Song list ===
#	Title	Singer
1	"Teri Tasveer Se Aankhen Meri Kyun Hatati Nahi"	Mohammed Rafi, Asha Bhosle
2	"Bhoole Afsane Phir Se Yaad Aaye"	Mohammed Rafi
3	"Yun Na Dekho Hame Pyar Aayega"	Asha Bhosle
4	"Rooth Kar Tum Bhala Yun Kahan"	Asha Bhosle
5	"Dil Me Dhadkan Lab Par Haye"	Usha Khanna, Hemlata
6	"Dekho Chhalla Mila Nishani"	Krishna Kalle
7	"Ek Do Teen Ye Mehjabin"	Mohammed Rafi
8	"Waqt Zalim Hai Kisiko Nahin Chhoda Isne"	Mohammed Rafi
