= Lahore (1949 film) =

- Directed by: M. L. Anand
- Produced by: Jaimini Dewan
- Starring: Nargis; Karan Dewan
- Music by: Shamsunder
- Release date: 1949
- Country: India
- Language: Hindi

Lahore is a 1949 Indian Hindi-language film directed by M. L. Anand. The film was produced by Jaimini Dewan. Set in Lahore, Punjab, it revolves around two lovers Chaman (played by Karan Dewan) and Neela (played by Nargis) who are separated during the violent Partition of India. Members of supporting cast included Om Prakash, Kuldip Kaur, Gulab, and Randhir.

Lahore premiered in Bombay in May 1949. It was generally well-received by critics. K. A. Abbas of Sound proclaimed, "Inspired by a historic speech made by the Deputy Prime Minister, Lahore is one the most significant films ever produced and tells a story as tender as any ever told since the movies began to talk." On the other hand, a review by The Times of India found Lahore disappointing.
