= Parakh (1944 film) =

1944 film

- Directed by: Sohrab Modi
- Starring: Mehtab; Yakub; Balwant Singh
- Music by: Khwaja Khurshid Anwar; Saraswati Devi
- Release date: 1944
- Country: India
- Language: Hindi

Parakh is a 1944 Bollywood social film.

Directed by Sohrab Modi, it starred Mehtab, Yakub, Eruch Tarapore, Latika and Balwant Singh.

The music was composed by Khwaja Khurshid Anwar and Saraswati Devi.

== Cast ==
According to the Complete Index To World Film:

- Mehtab
- Yakub
- Eruch Tarapore
- Latika
- Balwant Singh
