= Rattan (film) =

1944 film

- Directed by: M. Sadiq
- Written by: R. S. Choudhury; D. N. Madhok
- Produced by: Abdul Rashid Kardar
- Starring: Swaran Lata; Karan Dewan; Amir Banu
- Music by: Naushad
- Release date: 1944
- Running time: 118 minutes
- Country: India
- Language: Hindustani

Rattan

Rattan or Ratan is a 1944 Indian film, directed by M. Sadiq, produced by Abdul Rashid Kardar, and starring Swaran Lata, Karan Dewan and Amir Bano.

It was the highest-grossing film of 1944.

The film is noted as the film which made Naushad one of the top music directors in the Indian film industry.

== Cast ==
- Swaranlata as Gauri
- Karan Dewan as Govind
- Wasti as Rattan, Gangu's brother
- Badri Prasad as Govind's father
- Manju as Manju, Rattan's sister
- Gulab as Govind's mother
- Rajkumari Shukla
- Auzurie as Gangu
- Chanda Bai as the Bhabhi
- Amirbano as Gauri's mother

== Music ==
The film had music by Naushad, with lyrics by the popular poet of the 1940s, D. N. Madhok.

- "Akkhiyan Mila Ke Jiya Bharma Ke, Chale Nahin Jana" - Zohrabai Ambalawali
- "Rum Jhum Barse Baadarwa, Mast Hawain Aaein, Piya Ghar Aaja" - Zohrabai Ambalawali
- "Milke Bichhad Gayii Akkhiyan" - Amirbai Karnataki
- "Jab Tum Hi Chale Pardes Laga Kar Theiss" - Karan Dewan
- "O janewale Balamwa" - Amirbai Karnataki and Shyam Kumar
- "Pardesi Balma Baadal Aaya" - Zohrabai Ambalewali
- "Aai Diwali Aai Diwali" - Zohrabai Ambalewali
- "Angdai Teri Hai Bahana" - Manju
- "Jhoothe Hain Sab Sapne Suhane" - Manju
- "Sawan Ke Baadalo Unn Se Yeh Jaa Kaho" - Zohrabai Ambalewali and Karan Dewan

The song "Aai Diwali Aai Diwali" is set in raga Bhairavi.
