= Sharda (1942 film) =

- Directed by: Abdul Rashid Kardar
- Written by: M Nazir
- Starring: Mehtab; Nirmala Devi; Shyam Kumar; Wasti
- Music by: Naushad
- Release date: 1942
- Country: India
- Language: Hindi

Sharda is a 1942 Bollywood film directed by Abdur Rashid Kardar. It starred Mehtab, Amir Banu, Nirmala Devi and Wasti. The film focuses on the importance of girls' education. It was the first prominent work of the music composer Naushad. Suraiya lent her voice to the film as playback singer when she was just twelve years old. The film was remade as Salma in 1960.

== Cast ==
- Mehtab
- Ulhas
- Nirmala Devi
- Wasti
- Badri Prasad
- Amir Banu
- Shyam Kumar
