= Mehtab (actress) =

Indian actress (1913 - 1997)

- Screenshot from Jhansi Ki Rani (1953)
- Born: Najma Khan; 28 April 1913; Sachin, Gujarat, India
- Died: 10 April 1997 (aged 83); Mumbai, Maharashtra
- Resting place: Bada Qabrastan, Marine Lines, Mumbai
- Occupation: Actress
- Years active: 1928–1969
- Spouses: Ashraf Khan (divorced) Sohrab Modi (m. 1946; died 1984)
- Children: 2 sons Ismail and Mehelli
- Parent: Nawab Sidi Ibrahim Muhammad Yakut Khan III (father)

Mehtab Modi (born Najma Khan; 28 April 1913 – 10 April 1997), known professionally as Mehtab, was an Indian actress of Hindi-Urdu films who worked from 1928 to 1969.

== Early life ==
She was born in Sachin, Gujarat, into a Muslim family and was named Najma Khan. Her father, Nawab Sidi Ibrahim Mohammad Yakut Khan III, was the Nawab of Sachin, near Surat in the state of Gujarat. Starting her career in the late 1920s with small roles in films like Second Wife (1928), Indira B. A. (1929) and Jayant (1929), she went on to do character roles before acting in the lead opposite Ashraf Khan in Veer Kunal (1932). After almost a decade of doing mainly action-oriented roles, she came into prominence with the Kidar Sharma-directed Chitralekha (1941).

She married her early co-star Ashraf Khan with whom she had a son. They divorced later and she married Sohrab Modi in 1946, with whom she had another son. Modi cast her in the historical drama Jhansi Ki Rani (1953), which in spite of having spectacular scenes and lavish sets could not work well at the box office. She stopped acting in films following 1953 except to act in her last role as a character artist in Modi's Samay Bada Balwan (1969). She died in Mumbai on 10 April 1997.

== Career ==
Mehtab acted in her early feature film Kamaal-e-Shamsheer (1930) with W. M. Khan, which was produced by her mother under Excelsior film company. Her other films at this time include Hamara Hindustan (1930), a silent film which starred Ruby Myers, Jal Merchant and Mazhar Khan. She went on to act in several films mainly in action roles produced by the Sharda Film Company under different directors. Finally in 1932, she acted under the banner of Indian Art Productions as the main female lead in Veer Kunal, opposite Ashraf Khan, an actor she was to marry and then divorce. She continued to work under different banners including Chandulal Shah for Ranjit Movietone in Bhola Shika (1933), directed by Jayant Desai, with E. Billimoria as hero, and Ranchandi directed by Babubhai Jani opposite Navin Chandra. She also acted in a couple of films directed by Jaddanbai like Moti Ka Haar and Jeevan Swapna, both in 1937.

Following the birth of her son, and subsequent divorce from Ashraf Khan, Mehtab acted in the Film Corporation of India film Qaidi (1940), which had Ramola, Madhuri, Wasti and Nandrekar co-starring along with her. She got a chance in the film Chitralekha (1941). Chitralekha was also the debut of actor Bharat Bhushan, though in a small role. Mehtab was cast in Sharda (1942), along with Wasti, Ulhas and Nirmala Devi by A. R. Kardar for his Kardar Productions. The film is famous for the thirteen-year-old Suraiya, who became famous giving playback singing for a much older Mehtab. 1943 saw her acting in two more Kardar directed films; Kanoon with Shahu Modak, Nirmala Devi and Jagirdar and Sanjog a comedy film opposite Noor Mohammed Charlie, Wasti and Ulhas. The same year she did a Wadia Productions film directed by Homi Wadia, Vishwas (1943), which also starred Surendra, and Trilok Kapoor, with composer Feroz Nizami debuting as the music director.

In 1944, Sohrab Modi cast Mehtab in the Central Studio production Parakh. Mehtab recalled in an interview that it was while shooting for this film that the two had grown closer. Modi did not act in the film which starred Mehtab with Yakub and Balwant Singh. Parakh had music by Khursheed Anwar and Saraswati Devi. Mehtab acted in films like Ismat (1944), Ek Din Ka Sultan (1945), Saathi (1946) and Shama (1946). In 1953, Modi produced, directed and acted in Jhansi Ki Rani, which starred a now ageing Mehtab as the young Jhansi Ki Rani. The film was a big financial disaster and the last starring role of Mehtab. Mehtab acted in Modi's Samay Bada Balwan (1969) in a character role.

== Personal life ==
Mehtab, a Muslim, married Sohrab Modi, a Parsi, on 28 April 1946, her birthday. According to Mehtab, the marriage was not approved of by Modi's family. This was Mehtab's second marriage and she had an eight-year-old son, Ismail, from her previous marriage to her first co-star Ashraf Khan. Her condition for marrying Modi was that her son, Ismail, stay with them. Modi talked the situation over with her ex-husband, regarding Ismail, who then lived with Mehtab and Modi following their marriage. Modi was 16 years older than her and was 48 years old when they married; he also had just finished his relationship with Naseem Banu. Mehtab and Modi had one child together called, Mehelli Modi, who they brought up as a Parsi. Sohrab Modi died on 28 January 1984, at the age of 86 years. Mehtab died on 10 April 1997, 18 days before her 84th birthday, in Mumbai, Maharashtra and was buried at the Bada Qabrastan, Marine Lines, Mumbai.

== Awards ==
Mehtab received the Best Actress award in a Hindi film for Parakh at the 8th Annual BFJA Awards.

== Filmography ==
- Second Wife (1928)
- Jayant (1929)
- Indira B. A. (1929)
- Kamaal-e-Shamsheer (1930)
- Hamara Hindustan (1930)
- Prithviraj (1931)
- Virni Vibhuti (1931)
- Diwano (1931)
- Husn Pari (1931)
- Shooro Sainik (1931)
- Jange Davlat (1931)
- Shaliwahan (1931)
- Khubsoorat Khawasan (1932)
- Veer Kunal (1932)
- Bhola Shikar (1933)
- Krishna Sudama (1933)
- Miss 1933 (1933)
- Pardesi Preetam (1933)
- Ranchandi (1933)
- Cinema Queen (1934)
- Prem Pariksha (1934)
- Veer Pujan (1934)
- Laheri Jawan (1935)
- Magic Horse (1935)
- Stree Dharma (1935)
- Taqdeer (1935)
- Bholi Bhikharan (1936)
- Moti Ka Haar (1937)
- Jeevan Swapna (1937)
- Devbala (1938)
- Baghi (1939)
- Leatherface (1939)
- Ek Hi Bhool (1940)
- Qaidi (1940)
- Chitralekha (1941)
- Masoom (1941)
- Bhakta Kabir (1942)
- Chaurangee (1942)
- Sharda (1942)
- Kanoon (1943)
- Sanjog (1943)
- Vishwas (1943)
- Bahar (1944)
- Jeevan (1944)
- Ismat (1944)
- Parakh (1944)
- Ek Din Ka Sultan (1945)
- Behram Khan (1946)
- Sathi (1946)
- Shama (1946)
- Jhansi Ki Rani (1953)
- Samay Bada Balwan (1969)
