= Nirmala Devi =

Indian actress

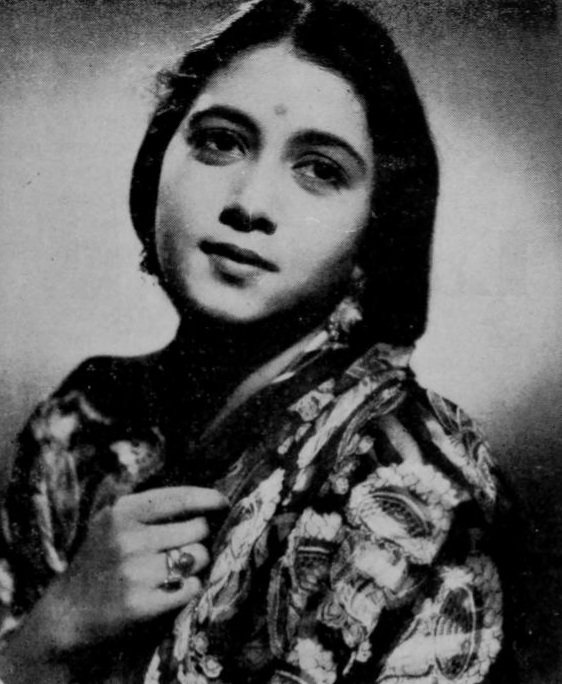
- Nirmala in Sharda (1942)
- Born: 7 June 1927; Benares, Benares State, British India (present-day Varanasi, Uttar Pradesh, India)
- Died: 15 June 1996 (aged 69); Mumbai, Maharashtra, India
- Occupations: Vocalist, Actress, Singer
- Spouse: Arun Kumar Ahuja
- Children: 5 (including Govinda)
- Relatives: Ahuja family

Nirmala Devi (7 June 1927 – 15 June 1996) also known as Dulari, was an Indian actress in the 1940s and a Hindustani classical vocalist of the Patiala Gharana. Bollywood actor Govinda is her son.

== Early life ==
Nirmala Devi was born as Nazim on 7 June 1927, in Varanasi (then known as Banares), Uttar Pradesh. Her father was Vasudev Narayan Singh, a well known Hindu tabla maestro in Varanasi of that time. However, Nirmala was raised by her aunt who was a tawaif by profession. Nirmala's siblings include musician Lachhu Maharaj and actress Kumkum.

At a young age, Nirmala was enrolled by her aunt into music classes from Ustad Ata Mohammad Khan of the Patiala gharana, who had previously taught high-profile figures such as Begum Akhtar.

== Career ==
Nirmala made her film debut in Savera (1942), with actor Arun Kumar Ahuja as co-star. She went on to marry him the same year. Nirmala subsequently starred in Sharda (1942) and Gaali (1944). The latter, also featuring Karan Dewan, was a popular release. In 1945, she played Motilal's leading lady in S. M. Yusuf's Piya Milan, in which Baburao Patel described her as the only good performer in the film. She received similar reviews for her performance in Nanabhai Bhatt's comedy Chalis Karod (1946).

In 1948, she reunited with her husband in their home production, Sehra, which was unsuccessful at the box office. Her subsequent release Anmol Ratan (1950) also turned out to be a critical and commercial failure. Nirmala's final screen appearance was in Jai Mahalakshmi (1951).

Before Govinda started working in films, Nirmala was the sole earning member of her family.

== Personal life and death ==
Nirmala Devi was born a Hindu, but raised as a Muslim. In 1942, she reclaimed Hinduism and eloped with her first co-star, Arun Kumar Ahuja. The marriage was opposed by her aunt Mannan Jan; Nirmala ultimately severed ties with her aunt.

Nirmala and Arun had five children: three daughters—Padma, Kamini and Pushpa—and two sons—Kirti and Govinda.

Nirmala died on 15 June 1996, at the age of 69, in Mumbai.

== Work ==
=== As actor ===
- Savera (1942)
- Sharda (1942)
- Kanoon (1943)
- Geet (1944)
- Gaali (1944)
- Jeevan (1944)
- Piya Milan (1945)
- Chalis Karod (1946) as Muniya
- Ghunghat (1946)
- Sehra (1948) — produced by her husband
- Janamashtami (1950)
- Anmol Ratan (1950)
- Jai Mahalakshmi (1951)

=== As playback singer ===
- Ram Teri Ganga Maili (1985)
- Bawarchi (1972) – one of the performers on the track "Bhor Aai Gaya Andhiyara"
- Zara Bachke (1959)
- Shama Parwana (1954)

=== Music albums ===
Genre: Hindustani Classical / Music Label: His Master's Voice

Singles:

- Banaa Banaa Ke Tamanaa & Gham Ki Nishani (Ghazal)
- Jaadu Bhare Tore Nainava Ram & Mori Baali Umar Beeti Jaye (Thumri)

Full Albums:

- Saavan Beetaa Jaye (Thumri) (With Ms Laxmi Shankar, contemporary singer)
- Weekend Pleasure (Thumri)
- Thumriyan by Nirmala Devi (Thumri)
- Laakhon Ke Bol Sahe (Thumri)
- Ghazals by Nirmala Devi (Ghazal)

== Bibliography ==
- Dewan, Saba (3 November 2023). Tawaifnama. Context. ISBN 978-93-95073-59-2.
