= Naushad =

Indian composer (1919–2006)

Naushad Ali PB
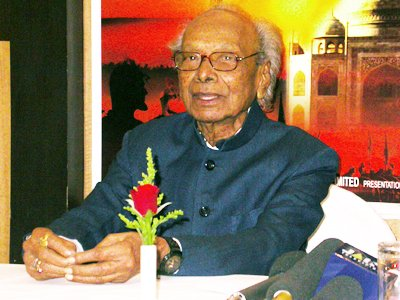
- Naushad Ali in 2005

Background information
- Born: 25 December 1919; Lucknow, United Provinces of Agra and Oudh, British India (present-day Uttar Pradesh, India)
- Died: 5 May 2006 (aged 86) Mumbai, Maharashtra, India
- Education: Bhatkhande Sanskriti Vishwavidyalaya
- Genres: Hindustani classical music; Indian film music
- Occupations: Composer, music director, film producer, writer, poet, producer
- Instruments: Harmonium; sitar; piano; tabla; flute; clarinet; accordion; mandolin
- Years active: 1940–2005
- Spouse: Aliya Khatoon

Naushad Ali (25 December 1919 – 5 May 2006) was an Indian composer for Hindi films. He is widely considered to be one of the greatest and foremost music directors of the Hindi film industry. He is respectfully remembered as "Moseeqar-e-Azam" (The great Musician) in the Hindi film industry. He is particularly known for popularising the use of classical music in films.

His first film as an independent music director was Prem Nagar in 1940. His first musically successful film was Rattan (1944), followed by 35 silver jubilee hits, 12 golden jubilee and 3 diamond jubilee mega successes. Naushad was conferred the Dadasaheb Phalke Award and the Padma Bhushan in 1981 and 1992 respectively for his contribution to the Hindi film industry.

== Early life and education ==
Naushad Ali was born and raised in Lucknow, a city with a long tradition as a centre of Indian Muslim culture. His father, Wahid Ali, was a munshi (court clerk). As a child, Naushad would visit the annual fair at the Deva Sharif in Barabanki, 25 km from Lucknow, where all the great qawwals and musicians of the time would perform before the devotees. He studied Hindustani music there under Ustad Ghurbat Ali, Ustad Yusuf Ali, Ustad Babban Saheb and others. He also repaired harmoniums.

As a lad, he joined a junior theatrical club and was appointed the club's music maestro for their theatrical presentations. He used to watch silent films at the Royal theatre in Lucknow. Theatre owners would hire a team of musicians to play the tabla, harmonium, sitar and violin. The musicians would watch the film first, make notes, finalize the scales required. When the show began in the evening, they would sit in front of the screen and play music for the scenes. This was a great way to be entertained and learn music at the same time. It made him grasp the nuances required in composing a film's background music score.

In time Naushad formed his own Windsor Music Entertainers or just Windsor Entertainers, so named because he had seen the word "Windsor" around Lucknow and liked its ring. It led to the Indian Star Theatrical Company in a theatre at Golaganj colony in Lucknow. He was trained under Laddan Khan until he became capable of working independently as a composer. There he also developed the sense to pick rare musical jewels from the folk tradition of Punjab, Rajasthan, Gujarat and Saurashtra during the company's sojourns in those regions. The travelling players got as far as Viramgam in Gujarat, where they discovered penury, even after selling off theatrical props and musical instruments. The company limped back to Lucknow through the kindness of one of Naushad's friends.

Naushad had already become a cinema fan in the silent era and then, in 1931, Indian cinema got voice and music that further fascinated the 13-year-old boy. He learnt classical and folk music against the wishes of his father. He moved to Mumbai in late 1937 for a career as a musician.

== Career ==
In Mumbai, he initially stayed with an acquaintance from Lucknow (U.P.) at Colaba and after a while, shifted to Dadar opposite the Broadway theatre where he would sleep on the footpath. He assisted music director Ustad Jhande Khan who was at the peak of his success those days, at a monthly salary of Rs 40.

Then he worked on a film with a Russian producer with the studio located at Chembur. This film could not be completed. Naushad was a piano player so he worked as a pianist in composer Ustad Mushtaq Hussain's orchestra. He then polished off an unfinished film score and got a credit as assistant to Mushtaq Hussain. Then the film company collapsed. Composer Khemchand Prakash took him on as his assistant for the film Kanchan at Ranjit Studios at a salary of Rs 60 per month, for which Naushad remained extremely grateful and in interviews, he had called Khemchand his guru.

His friend, lyricist D. N. Madhok, trusted Naushad's unusual talent for composing music and introduced him to various film producers. Chandulal Shah, the owner of Ranjit Studios, offered to sign Naushad for one of his forthcoming films. Naushad composed a thumri for this film, "Bata de koi kaun gali gaye Shyam", but the film never went into production. He was assistant music director for the Punjabi film Mirza Sahib (1939).

He composed for his first independent film Prem Nagar in 1940 that had a story set in Kutch for which he did a lot of research into the folk music of the area. With A.R. Kardar's film Nayi Duniya (1942), he got first credit as "music director" and he began to work regularly for Kardar Productions. He, however, had a flexibility that he could work outside Kardar Productions and this arrangement continued throughout his career. He first got noticed with A.R. Kardar's film Sharda (1942) wherein 13-year-old Suraiya debuted with the song "Panchhi Ja" for the playback for heroine Mehtab. It was Rattan (1944) that took Naushad right to the top and enabled him to charge Rs 25,000 a film during those days.

Film expert and author Rajesh Subramanian opines that Kardar productions spent Rupees seventy five thousand in 1944 to make Rattan. The music by Naushad saheb was such a phenomenal hit that the company earned Rs 3 lacs as royalty from gramophone sales in the first year.

But his Lucknow-based family remained against music and Naushad had to hide from his family the fact that he composed music. When Naushad got married, the band was playing the tunes of the super hit songs of Naushad's film 'Rattan'. While Naushad's father and father-in-law were condemning the musician who had composed these songs, Naushad dared not tell them that it was he who had composed the music. Naushad understood Hindu and Muslim culture and the languages of those cultures.

From 1942 until the late 1960s, he was one of the top music directors in Hindi films. While he did 65 films during his lifetime, 26 of those films celebrated Silver jubilees (25 weeks run) – 8 celebrated golden jubilees (50 weeks run) and 4 celebrated diamond jubilees (60 weeks run) – (inclusive count – a diamond jubilee film also celebrates Silver and Golden jubilees).

Naushad worked with several lyricists, including Shakeel Badayuni, Majrooh Sultanpuri, D. N. Madhok, Zia Sarhadi, Yusufali Kechery and Khumar Barabankvi.

Mother India (1957), for which he had composed music, was the first Indian film that got nominated for an Oscar award.

In 1981, Naushad was awarded the Dadasaheb Phalke Award for his lifetime contribution to Indian cinema.

He composed the tunes of Taj Mahal: An Eternal Love Story (2005) at the age of 86.

Amongst his assistants, Mohammed Shafi, Jerry Amaldev and Ghulam Mohammed stand out prominently.

The songs composed by Naushad and sung by P. Susheela & K. J. Yesudas of the 1988 Malayalam film Dhwani, went on to become evergreen hits among the Malyali audience.

Five films have been made on his life and work. Biographical books published are Dastaan-E-Naushad (Marathi) by Shashikant Kinikar; Aaj Gaawat Man Mero (Gujarati); Hindi and Urdu biographical sketches in Shama & Sushma Magazines respectively, titled "Naushad Ki Kahani, Naushad Ki Zubani"; the last one was translated into Marathi by Shashikant Kinikar. Kinikar also came up with a book titled "Notes of Naushad" which puts together some interesting anecdotes of Naushad's life.

Naushad also composed background music for the TV serial "Akbar The Great" telecast in 1988 which was directed by Akbar Khan, brother of Hindi film stars Sanjay Khan and Feroze Khan as was also The Sword of Tipu Sultan produced and directed by Sanjay Khan and Akbar Khan which was telecast in 1990 and became very popular.

=== Death and legacy ===
Naushad died on 5 May 2006 in Mumbai due to cardiac arrest at age 86. He was buried at the Juhu Muslim cemetery.

He is survived by six daughters Zubeda, Fehmida, Farida, Sayeeda, Rashida, and Waheeda and three sons Rehman Naushad, Raju Naushad & Iqbal Naushad. Rehman Naushad being the eldest of all assisted him in some of his films. Also, Naushad composed music for two movies directed by Rehman Naushad, My Friend (1974) and Teri Payal Mere Geet (1989).

Naushad was ranked as one of the most respected and successful music directors of Indian Film Industry.

Naushad had requested the Maharashtra State Government to sanction a plot for an institution for promoting Hindustani music. This was sanctioned during his lifetime and the 'Naushad Academy of Hindustani Sangeet' was formed.

== Writer ==
Naushad was also a respected and published poet and formally launched his book of Urdu poetry entitled Aathwaan Sur ("The Eighth Note") and the Navras label's album titled "Aathwan Sur – The Other Side of Naushad" having 8 ghazals as part of Hounslow's book fair and festival "Bookmela" in November 1998. The album has lyrics and composition by Naushad, arranged by Uttam Singh.

Track list:

1. Aabadiyon Mein Dasht Ka Munzar Bhi Aayega – A. Hariharan – 7:08
2. Aaj Ki Baat Kal Pay Kyun Taalo – A. Hariharan & Preeti Uttam Singh – 6:17
3. Ghata Chhaayi Thi Saawan Khul Ke Barsa – Preeti Uttam Singh – 7:19
4. Kabhi Meri Yaad Unko Aati To Hogi – A. Hariharan & Preeti Uttam Singh – 6:18
5. Mujh Ko Muaff Kijiye – A. Hariharan – 5:35
6. Peenay Waalay Bekhudi Say Kaam Lay – A. Hariharan & Preeti Uttam Singh – 8:13
7. Saawan Kay Jab Baadal Chhaaye – A. Hariharan – 6:50
8. Tanhaa Khud Say Baat Karoon – Preeti Uttam Singh – 7:49

== Music style ==
Naushad gave a new trend to popular film music by basing his tunes on classical music ragas and folk music. Bhairavi (Hindustani) is his favourite Raga. Naushad was known for his skillful adaptation of the classical musical tradition for movie songs. Among all contemporary singer, Naushad Ali gave numbers of the songs to Mohammad Rafi. Most of Naushad Ali popular songs are sung by Mohammad Rafi. For some movies like Baiju Bawra, he composed all scores in classical raga modes and arranged for the well-known vocalist Amir Khan to be a music consultant for this film. Naushad could easily work with Western instruments, including the clarinet, the mandolin and the accordion. He could incorporate Western musical idioms in his compositions and compose for Western-style orchestras.

During the early 1940s, recordings were done in quiet parks and gardens after midnight because the studios did not have sound-proof recording rooms. In the gardens, there would be no echo and disturbances, unlike the studios where the sound reverberated because of the tin roofs.

For films like Uran Khatola and Amar, he recorded the voice of a particular artiste on a scale of 90, then recorded it on 70, then on 50 and so on. After the complete recording, it was played for the scene and the impact it created was terrific.

He was one of the first to introduce sound mixing and the separate recording of voice and music tracks in playback singing. He was the first to combine the flute and the clarinet, the sitar and mandolin. He also introduced the accordion to Hindi film music and was among the first to focus on background music to extend characters' moods and dialogue through music. But perhaps his greatest contribution was to bring Indian classical music into the film medium. Many of his compositions were inspired by ragas and he even used distinguished classical artistes like Amir Khan and D.V. Paluskar in Baiju Bawra (1952) and Bade Ghulam Ali Khan in Mughal-e-Azam (1960). Baiju Bawra (1952) demonstrated Naushad's grasp of classical music and his ability to bring it to the masses, for which he won the first Filmfare Best Music Director Award in 1954.

Naushad commented on a pre-release meeting about Baiju Bawra: "When people heard that the film would be full of classical music and ragas, they protested, 'People will get a headache and they will run away.' I was adamant. I wanted to change public taste. Why should people be fed what they like all the time? We presented them with music from our culture and it worked".

For Aan (1952), he was the first to use a 100-piece orchestra. He was the first composer to have developed the system of western notation in India. The notation for the music of the film Aan was published in book form in London.

In Uran Khatola (1955), he recorded an entire song without the use of orchestra, having replaced the sound of musical instruments with choral sound of humming.

For Mughal-e-Azam (1960) song Ae Mohabbat Zindabad, he used a chorus of 100 persons.

For Ganga Jamuna (1961), he used lyrics in chaste Bhojpuri dialect.

He used just six instruments in the title song of Mere Mehboob (1963).

In 2004, a colorized version of the classic Mughal-e-Azam (1960) was released, for which Naushad had the orchestral music specially re-created (in Dolby Digital) by today's industry musicians, while maintaining all the solo vocals from the original soundtrack. To elaborate, the playback vocals (though not the chorus) recorded four decades ago are mixed with orchestra tracks created in the present millennium.

As Indian film music gradually assumed a Western bend starting in the late 1960s, Naushad came to be considered old-fashioned. Composers who could compose rock-and-roll and disco-inflected music started getting increasingly popular. Naushad was still esteemed as a maestro, but his talents were sought mostly for historical movies where traditional scores were appropriate. It can be said of Naushad that in the early days of popular cinema music in the thirties and forties he set the standards for classical and folk music that resonated with the idea of India. In short he brought out the beauty of Indian music in a short film song of a few minutes which was not an easy feat. The composers who followed him were inspired by this aspect of his compositions.

== Filmography ==
=== Music director ===
Film	Year	Director	Cast	Remarks/Verdict
Prem Nagar	1940	Mohan Dayaram Bhavnani	Ramanand, Bimla Kumari, Husn Banu, Rai Mohan, Nagendra, Salu, Gulzar	Naushad was assistant for Baaghbaan (1938) and Kanchan (1941). According to him, he had composed one song in each film.
Darshan	1941	Chimanlal Muljibhoy Luhar	Prem Adib, Jyoti, Kaushalya, Bhudo Advani, Miradevi, M. Nazir, Shakir, Amirbai Karnataki, Madhusudan	
Mala	1941	Balwant Bhatt	Jayant, Rose, Jairaj, Nazir, Daya Devi, Heera	
Nai Duniya	1942	Abdul Rashid Kardar	Jairaj, Shobhna Samarth, Wasti, Madame Azurie, Mazhar Khan. Hari Shivdasani, Jeevan	Debut of Singer Surayya in the song, Boot karoon main polish Silver Jubilee
Sharda	1942	Abdul Rashid Kardar	Ulhas, Mehtab. Wasti, Nirmala, Badri Prasad	Silver Jubilee
Station Master	1942	Chimanlal Muljibhoy Luhar	Prem Adib, Pratima Devi, Gulab	
Kanoon	1943	Abdul Rashid Kardar	Mehtaab, Shahu Modak	Silver Jubilee
Namaste	1943	Mohammed Sadiq Sani	Wasti, Protima Das, Jagdish Sethi, Misra	Silver Jubilee
Sanjog	1943	Abdul Rashid Kardar	Charlie, Mehtab, Anwar Hussain	Silver Jubilee
Geet	1944	S. U. Sunny	Shahu Modak, Nirmala, Amir Ali	
Jeevan	1944	Mohammed Sadiq	Wasti, Mehtab, Badri Prasad, Anwar, Shyam Kumar	
Pehle Aap	1944	Abdul Rashid Kardar	Shamim, Wasti, Anwar Hussain, Jeevan, Dixit	Rafi's first song for Naushad Hindustan ke hum hain in a chorus Silver Jubilee
Rattan	1944	S Sadiq	Amir Banu, Karan Dewan, Swarnalata	Diamond Jubilee
Sanyasi	1945	Abdul Rashid Kardar	Shamim, Amar, Misra, Shyam Kumar, Naseem Jr., Gulam Mohamad	Silver Jubilee
Anmol Ghadi	1946	Mehboob Khan	Noorjehan, Surinder, Suraiya	Diamond Jubilee
Keemat	1946	Nazir Ajmeri	Amar, Sulochana Chatterjee, A Shah, Sharda, Badri Prasad, Sofia, Anwari, Nawab	
Shahjehan	1946	Abdul Rashid Kardar	Kundan Lal Saigal, Ragini	Silver Jubilee
Dard	1947	Abdul Rashid Kardar	Uma Devi, Suraiya	Debut of Singer Uma Devi (Comedy Actress Tuntun) in the song, Afsana likh rahi hoon. Silver Jubilee
Elaan	1947	Mehboob Khan	Himalaywala, Leela Mishra, Shah Nawaz	
Naatak	1947	S. U. Sunny	Suraiya, Amar, Sofiya, Kanwar, Sham Kumar, Pratima Devi	Silver Jubilee
Anokhi Ada	1948	Mehboob Khan	Surendra, Naseem Bano, Murad, Cuckoo	Golden Jubilee
Mela	1948	S. U. Sunny	Dilip Kumar, Nargis, Jeevan	Golden Jubilee
Andaz	1949	Mehboob Khan	Dilip Kumar, Raj Kapoor, Nargis	Golden Jubilee
Chandni Raat	1949	Mohammed Ehsan	Shyam, Naseem Bano	
Dillagi	1949	Abdul Rashid Kardar	Shyam, Suraiyya, Sharda, Amir Banu, Amar	Silver Jubilee
Dulari	1949	Abdul Rashid Kardar	Suresh, Madhubala, Geeta Bali	Silver Jubilee
Babul	1950	S. U. Sunny	Dilip Kumar, Nargis	Also as Producer. Silver Jubilee
Dastan	1950	Abdul Rashid Kardar	Raj Kapoor, Suraiya, Veena, Suresh	Also as Co-producer. Silver Jubilee
Deedar	1951	Nitin Bose	Dilip Kumar, Nimmi, Nargis, Ashok Kumar	Golden Jubilee
Jadoo	1951	Abdul Rashid Kardar	Suresh, Nalini Jaywant	Also as Co-producer. Silver Jubilee
Aan	1952	Mehboob Khan	Dilip Kumar, Nimmi, Nadira	Golden Jubilee
Baiju Bawra	1952	Vijay Bhatt	Bharat Bhushan, Meena Kumari	Also as Co-producer. Film debut of singers, Amir Khan and D. V. Paluskar in the song, Aaj gaavat man mero jhoomke. Diamond Jubilee
Deewana	1952	Abdul Rashid Kardar	Suraiya, Suresh, Sumitra Devi, Shyam Kumar	Silver Jubilee
Amar	1954	Mehboob Khan	Dilip Kumar, Nimmi, Madhubala	
Shabaab	1954	Mohammed Sadiq	Bharat Bhushan, Nutan	Silver Jubilee
Uran Khatola	1955	S. U. Sunny	Dilip Kumar, Nimmi.	Also as Producer. Silver Jubilee
Mother India	1957	Mehboob Khan	Nargis, Raj Kumar, Rajendra Kumar, Sunil Dutt, Kanhaiyalal	Diamond Jubilee
Sohni Mahiwal	1958	Raja Nawathe	Bharat Bhushan, Nimmi	Debut of singer Mahendra Kapoor in the song Chaand chhupa aur taarey doobey
Kohinoor	1960	S. U. Sunny	Dilip Kumar, Meena Kumari, Kumkum, Jeevan	Golden Jubilee
Mughal-e-Azam	1960	K. Asif	Dilip Kumar, Madhubala, Prithviraj Kapoor, Durga Khote, Ajit	Film debut of singer Bade Ghulam Ali Khan in the songs Shubh din aayo and Prem jogan ban ke. Diamond Jubilee
Gunga Jumna	1961	Nitin Bose	Dilip Kumar, Vyjayantimala Bali	Lyrics of several songs were in Bhojpuri dialect. Golden Jubilee
Son of India	1962	Mehboob Khan	Kamaljit, Kumkum, Sajid, Simi Garewal, Jayant	
Mere Mehboob	1963	H. S. Rawail	Rajendra Kumar, Sadhana, Ameeta, Ashok Kumar, Nimmi	Silver Jubilee
Leader	1964	Ram Mukherjee	Dilip Kumar, Vyjayantimala Bali	
Dil Diya Dard Liya	1966	Abdul Rashid Kardar	Dilip Kumar, Waheeda Rehman, Pran	
Saaz Aur Awaaz	1966	Subodh Mukherji	Saira Banu, Kanhaiyalal, Joy Mukherjee	
Palki	1967	S. U. Sunny	Rajendra Kumar, Waheeda Rehman, Rehman, Johnny Walker	Also as Writer
Ram Aur Shyam	1967	Tapi Chanakya	Dilip Kumar, Waheeda Rehman, Mumtaz, Pran, Nirupa Roy, Leela Mishra	Golden Jubilee
Aadmi	1968	A. Bhimsingh	Dilip Kumar, Waheeda Rehman, Manoj Kumar	
Saathi	1968	C. V. Sridhar	Rajendra Kumar, Vyjayantimala Bali, Simi Garewal	
Sunghursh	1968	H. S. Rawail	Dilip Kumar, Vyjayanthimala, Balraj Sahni	
Ganwaar	1970	Naresh Kumar	Rajendra Kumar, Vyjayantimala Bali, Nishi	
Pakeezah	1972	Kamal Amrohi	Raj Kumar, Meena Kumari, Ashok Kumar	Background Score and songs. Golden Jubilee
Tangewala	1972	Naresh Kumar	Rajendra Kumar, Mumtaz, Sujit Kumar	
My Friend	1974	M Rehman	Rajeev, Prema Narayan, Utpal Dutt, Jagdeep, Asit Sen, Tuntun	
Aaina	1974	K. Balachander	Mumtaz, Rajesh Khanna	
Sunehra Sansar	1975	Adurti Subba Rao	Rajendra Kumar, Hema, Mala Sinha	
Chambal Ki Rani	1979	Radhakant	Amjad Khan, Dara Singh, Mahendra Sandhu	
Dharam Kanta	1982	Sultan Ahmed	Raj Kumar, Waheeda Rehman, Jeetendra, Reena Roy, Rajesh Khanna, Sulakhshana Pandit	
Paan Khaye Saiyan Hamaar	1984	Sujit Kumar	Sujit Kumar, Bandini Mishra, S. N. Tripathi	Bhojpuri film
Love and God	1986	K. Asif	Sanjeev Kumar, Nimmi, Pran	
Dhwani	1988	A. T. Abu	Prem Nazir, Jayaram, Shobana	Malayalam film
Teri Payal Mere Geet	1989	Rehman Naushad	Govinda, Meenakshi Seshadri	
Awaaz De Kahan Hai	1990	Sibte Hassan Rizvi	Bindu, Annu Kapoor, Satyendra Kapoor	
Guddu	1995	Prem Lalwani	Shah Rukh Khan, Manisha Koirala, Mukesh Khanna	
Taj Mahal: An Eternal Love Story	2005	Akbar Khan	Kabir Bedi, Sonia, Monisha Koirala	Last released work of Naushad, famous for Apni julfein sung by Hariharan, and other songs
Hubba Khatoon	Unreleased	B. R. Chopra	Sanjay Khan, Zeenat Aman	Jis raat ke khwaab aaye, sung by Rafi is released

=== Non-film album ===
- Aathwan Sur – The Other Side of Naushad : This was a Ghazal album released in 1998 and had all its songs composed by Naushad and sung by Hariharan and Preeti Uttam Singh.

=== Producer ===
- Maalik (1958; music director for this film was Ghulam Mohammed)
- Uran Khatola (1955)
- Babul (1950)
- Jeevan Jyoti (1953, co-producer; music director for this film was SD Burman)
- Gawaiya (1954, co-producer; music director for this film was Ram Ganguly)
- Yasmin (1955, co-producer; music director for this film was C Ramchandra)
- Dastan (1950)
- Jadoo (1951)

=== Storywriter ===
- Palki (1967)
- Teri Payal Mere Geet (1989)

== Awards and recognition ==
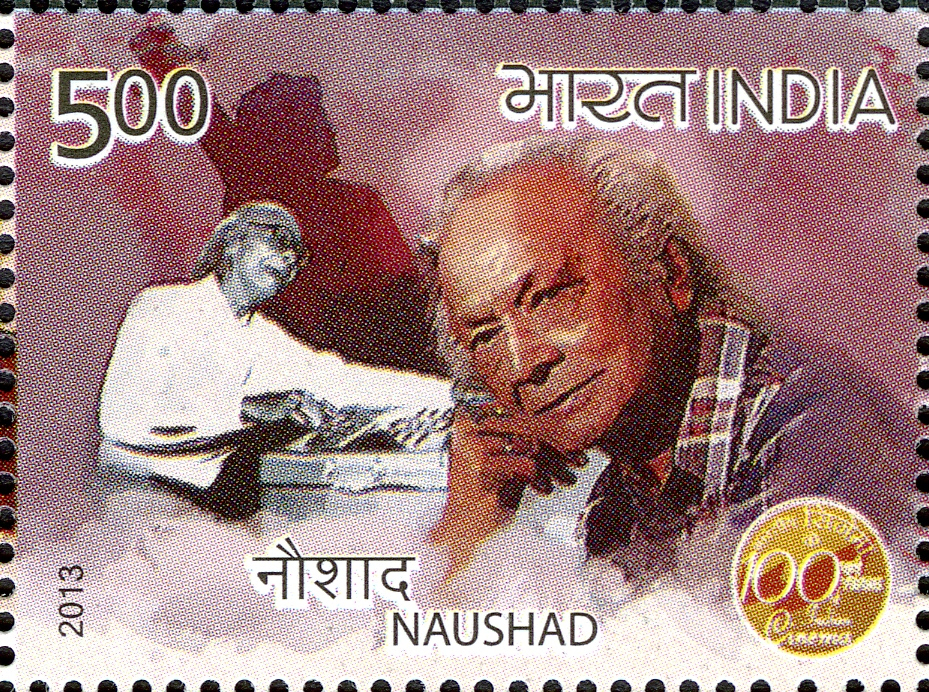
Naushad on a 2013 stamp of India

- 1954: Filmfare Best Music Director Award – Baiju Bawra
- 1961: Bengal Film Journalists' Association's 'Best Music Director Award' for film Gunga Jumna (1961)
- 1975: "Naushad Ali", a 30-minute documentary film produced by Television Centre, Mumbai
- 1981: Dadasaheb Phalke Award
- 1984: Lata Mangeshkar Award (Madhya Pradesh State Government's Award)
- 1987: Amir Khusrow Award
- 1990: Best Music for The Sword of Tipu Sultan TV series
- 1992: Sangeet Natak Akademi Award
- 1992: Padma Bhushan Award for his lifetime contributions to Indian cinema
- 1993: Awadh Ratna Award by Government of Uttar Pradesh
- 1994: Maharashtra Gaurav Puruskar Award
- 2000: Screen Lifetime Achievement Award
- 2008: The Carter Road situated at Bandra, was renamed as Sangeet Samrat Naushad Ali Marg in his memory

== Positions held ==
- President of Cine Music Directors Association
- Chairman of Indian Performing Rights Society
- President of Maharashtra State Angling Association
- President of Alam-E-Urdu Conference (Delhi)
- The title of Special Executive Magistrate, Mumbai

== Bibliography ==
- Bharatan, Raju (2014). Naushadnama: The Life and Music of Naushad. Hay House Inc. ISBN 9789381398630.
