= Zohrabai Ambalewali =

Indian singer

- Born: Zohrabai; 1918; Ambala, Punjab, British India (present-day Ambala, Haryana, India)
- Died: 21 February 1990 (aged 71–72)
- Occupation: Singer
- Years active: 1932–1953
- Known for: Rattan (1944); Zeenat (1945); Anmol Ghadi (1946)

Zohrabai Ambalewali (1918 – 21 February 1990) was an Indian classical singer and playback singer in Hindi cinema in the 1930s and 1940s. She was considered one of the most popular female playback singers of early and mid 1940s.

She is best known for her contralto or low voice range singing in the film songs, "Ankhiyan Milake Jiyaa Bharmaake" and "Aai Diwali, Aai Diwali" in 1944 hit Rattan (1944), with music by Naushad, and "Uran Khatole Pe Ud Jaoon", duet with Shamshad Begum in Anmol Ghadi (1946), also under Naushad's music direction. She, along with Rajkumari, Shamshad Begum and Amirbai Karnataki, were amongst the leading first generation of playback singers in the Hindi film industry. However, by the late 1940s, the arrival of new voices like Geeta Dutt and Lata Mangeshkar, meant Zohrabai Ambalewali's career faded away.

== Early life and background ==
Born and brought up in Ambala in present-day Haryana, to family of professional singers, which lend to her surname, 'Ambalewali', started her musical training under Ghulam Hussain Khan and Ustad Nasir Hussain Khan. Subsequently, she was trained in music by the Agra gharana of Hindustani music.

== Career ==
Ambalewali started her career at age 13, as a singer with the All India Radio, singing mainly classical and semi-classical numbers. This led to recording a few albums of thumris with His Master's Voice. Eventually she made her Hindi film debut as a playback singer with film Daku Ki Ladki (1933) with music by Pransukh Nayak. After initial years in Lahore-based film industry, she shifted to Bombay (now Mumbai). Her musical success came with film Rattan (1944) under music director Naushad Ali, and such hit songs as "Aai Diwali Aai Diwali" and "Akhiyan Mila Ke, Jiya Bharma Ke". She sang for music director Naushad, again in hit films like Anmol Ghadi (1946), Mela (1948), and Jadoo (1951). She also sang a qawwali with Noor Jehan and Kalyani "Aahen Na Bhareen Shikway Na Kiye" in Zeenat (1945), which was the first ever Qawwali recorded in female voices in South Asian films and became very popular among the public.

This was the era when heavy thumri-style and the leading playback singers with nasal voices were singing in the Hindi cinema, with singers like Shamshad Begum, Khurshid, Amirbai Karnataki. This was right before the arrival of Lata Mangeshkar in 1948, which along with Geeta Dutt and Sudha Malhotra, and later Suman Kalyanpur shifted the popular taste towards finer voices, effectively bringing their careers to a gradual end. Another major film playback singer of that era Noor Jehan decided to migrate to Pakistan and had a highly successful singing career in Pakistan until she died in 2000.

Zohrabai Ambalewali retired in the 1950s from the film industry, though she continued to sing at the performances of her daughter Roshan Kumari, a noted Kathak dancer, who also performed in Satyajit Ray's film Jalsaghar (1958).

== Filmography ==
- Daku Ki Ladki (1933)
- Gramophone Singer (1938)
- Geet (1944)
- Pehle Aap (1944)
- Rattan (1944)
- Zeenat (1945)
- Sohni Mahiwal (1946)
- Anmol Ghadi (1946)
- Devar (1946)
- Elaan (1947)
- Mela (1948)
- Chunariya (1948)
- Mahal (1949)
- Dil Ki Basti (1949)
- Preet Ki Manzil (1950)
- Jadoo (1951)
- Kashmir (1951)
- Usha Kiran (1952)
- Amber (1952 film)
