= Amirbai Karnataki =

Singer (1906-1965)

- Born: 1906; Bagalkote, Karnataka, British India
- Died: 3 March 1965 (aged 58–59) India
- Genre: Playback singing
- Occupations: Singer, actor
- Instrument: Vocalist
- Years active: 1935 – 1961

Amirbai Karnataki (c. 1906 – 3 March 1965) was a famous actress/singer and playback singer of the early Hindi cinema and was famous as Kannada Kokila. Mahatma Gandhi was an ardent fan of her song Vaishnav Jan To.

== Early life ==
Amirbai Karnataki was born in Bilgi town, Bijapur district, Karnataka into a middle-class family. Of all of her five sisters, Amirbai and her elder sister, Gauharbai, earned fame and fortune. Amirbai completed her matriculation and went to Bombay at the age of 25 in 1931.

== Career ==
Amirbai was a talented singer and actress, who was fluent in Kannada (mother tongue) and Gujarati languages. "Mahre Te Gaamde Ek Vaar Aavjo" is one of her famous Gujarati songs from the film Ranak Devi (1946), with music composer Avinash Vyas. A representative from His Master's Voice was so impressed by her singing talent that he made her sing a Qawwali, which became very popular. This qawwali song was for the film Zeenat (1945) by film producer-director Shaukat Hussain Rizvi. She sung her most famous duet song with Lata Mangeshkar "Gore Gore O Banke Chhore" Film: Samadhi. Her elder sister, Gauherbai, was an actress and helped Amirbai get a role in the film Vishnu Bhakti in 1934.

Initially, Amirbai sang songs in films, but they failed to attain the success she desired. In 1943, with the release of Bombay Talkies' Kismet (1943 film), she achieved popularity: the songs of Kismet became a rage and Amirbai became famous. The man behind the success was the composer Anil Biswas. She was initially known as a singing star, but at the decline of her career, she became a playback singer. She reached her career peak by 1947.

After 1947, Lata Mangeshkar became a rising star, so once again Amirbai switched over to acting. In her later years, she mostly played character roles. Amirbai also composed music for Wahab Pictures' film Shehnaaz (1948). In the same year she almost left Hindi Cinema for Gujarati and Marwari films. One of the famous film magazines "Film India" had mentioned in one of its articles that at that time in the 20th century, when other singers used to get Rs. 500 for singing a song, Amirbai used to get Rs. 1000 per recording.

== Personal life ==
Amirbai's married life was full of ups and downs. Her first marriage was to the film actor Himalyavala (aka Afzal Qureshi). He was well-known for playing villainous roles in the movies. He used to beat Amirbai frequently after their marriage, and spent most of her earnings for his personal leisure. Amirbai had to put a fake smile on her face while performing as an actress and even while singing in studios. Famous Gujarati writer Bhai Ranjan Kumar Pandaya has recounted Amirbai's married life in detail. He says that Amirbai's elder sister Ahilya Bai, yearning for justice, one late night went to the famous Gujarati lawyer Chelshankar Vyas. She told Vyas that Himalayavala took a handsome amount and Amirbai's car in return for a divorce. The very next day, he had even kidnapped her publicly from a recording studio. He had imprisoned her in a room and was repeatedly beating her. Even the police sided with Himalayavala. Chelshankar Vyas, taking into account all these allegations, decided to help her. He used his societal status and judicial understanding and finally got a divorce for Amirbai.

In 1947, when India was partitioned into India and Pakistan, Himalayavala went to Pakistan and earned himself a good reputation as a talented actor. In India, Amirbai got married for the second time to Badri Kaanchwala, the editor of Paras, who was a better husband.

== Selected songs ==
- "O' Jaanay Waalay Balamwa Laut Kay Aa, Laut Kay Aa" Sung by Amirbai Karnataki and Shyam Kumar, lyrics by D. N. Madhok and music by Naushad Ali in the film Rattan (1944)
- "Dheere Dheere Aa Re, Baadal", from the film Kismet (1943 film).
- "Priya madhuvanadali", a Kannada song, sung by Amirbai, which is popular all over Karnataka even today

== Death ==
She had a paralytic attack in 1965, and died just four days later. She was buried in her hometown. A cinema hall is still run in the name of "Amir Talkies" in the city of Vijayapura (Bijapur), by her family.

== Biography ==
- Amirbai Karnataki written in Kannada by Rahamat Tarikere
- Amirbai Karnataki (translation by Prashant Kulkarni). Granthali. 2014. Archived from the original on 4 January 2015.
