= Ek Thi Reeta =

- Directed by: Roop K. Shorey
- Starring: Vinod Mehra; Tanuja; Rehman; I. S. Johar; Daisy Irani
- Music by: Jaidev Verma
- Release date: 1971
- Country: India
- Language: Hindi

Ek Thi Reeta (A Girl Called Reeta) is a 1971 Bollywood action comedy thriller, produced and directed by Roop K. Shorey. The film was an adaptation of Shorey's earlier success Ek Thi Ladki (1949), which starred his wife actress Meena Shorey and Motilal. The original owed its "popularity" more to the music of the film, especially the song "Larra Lappa" composed by music director Vinod.

In Ek Thi Reeta, Shorey tried to repeat the success of Ek Thi Ladki by using the same story. However, according to Narwekar, in his book, Eena Meena Deeka: The History of Hindi Film Comedy, the "formula" did not work and the film was not a success commercially. The film had music by Jaidev and starred Vinod Mehra, Tanuja and I. S. Johar in lead roles with Lolita Chatterjee, Rehman, Faryal and Manmohan Krishna forming the ensemble cast.

== Plot ==
The film involved a young girl called Reeta who believes herself to be an orphan. Implicated on a false murder charge, Reeta escapes, only to get involved in several comedic situations along with the film's hero.

== Cast ==
- Vinod Mehra
- Tanuja
- Rehman
- I. S. Johar
- Daisy Irani
- Lolita Chatterjee
- Manmohan Krishna
- Mona Malik
- Pompi

== Music ==
Ek Thi Reeta

Soundtrack album to Ek Thi Reeta by Jaidev Verma
- Released: 1971
- Language: Hindi

Jaidev Verma chronology
Reshma Aur Shera (1971)	Ek Thi Reeta (1971)	Do Boond Pani (1971)

The musical score for the film was composed by Jaidev Verma. The lyrics were written by Sarshar Sailani, Vikal Saketi, Prem Jalandhari, Naqsh Lyallpuri and Anjaan.

Song	Singer	Lyricist
"Duniya Chhup Chhupi Si Chor"	Asha Bhosle	Sarshar Sailani
"Main Kise Apna Kahu Aaj"	Mukesh, Lata Mangeshkar	Naqsh Lyallpuri
"Yeh Shor Hai Gali Gali Ke Wo Jawan Ho Chali"	Mohammed Rafi	Sarshar Sailani
"Bataaun Baat To"	Asha Bhosle, Jagjit Singh	Prem Jalandhari
"Jane Kyon Pritam Na Aaye"	Asha Bhosle	Prem Jalandhari
"Jo Mere Pyar Par Ho Shak To"	Mohammed Rafi, Asha Bhosle	Prem Jalandhari
"Kahee Hath Ham Se Chhuda Toh Na Loge"	Asha Bhosle	Sarshar Sailani
"Mai To Usi Se Karungi Aankhe Chaar"	Sarla Kapoor	Anjaan
"Balma Beimann Na Maane"	Manna Dey, Sarla Kapoor	Vikas Sakati
