= Meena Shorey =

Pakistani actress (1921-1989)

- Shorey in Actress (1948)
- Born: Khurshid Jehan; 13 November 1921; Raiwind, Punjab, British India
- Died: 3 September 1989 (aged 67); Lahore, Punjab, Pakistan
- Resting place: Lahore
- Other names: The Droll Queen of Partition; Lux Lady of Pakistan; The Lara Lappa Girl; The Comedienne of Calibre
- Occupation: Actress
- Years active: 1941–1983
- Spouses: Zahur Raja (m. 1941; div. 1942) Al Nasir (m. 1943; div. 1945) Raza Mir (m. 1946; div. 1947) Roop K. Shorey (m. 1948; div. 1956) Asad Bukhari (m. 1962; div. 1968)
- Children: 3
- Family: Roshan Lal Shorey (father-in-law; via fourth marriage)
- Awards: Special Nigar Award for 30 years of excellence in Pakistani film industry in 1982

Meena Shorey (born as Khurshid Jehan; 13 November 1921 – 3 September 1989) was a Pakistani film actress who worked first in Indian cinema and later Pakistani cinema. She appeared in Hindi/Urdu and Punjabi films. She started her acting career playing a character role, as Ambhi, Raja of Taxila's sister in Sohrab Modi's Sikandar (1941). Married to her fourth husband, Roop K. Shorey, by the mid-1940s, she found fame when she acted in her husband's film Ek Thi Ladki (1949), opposite actor Motilal. The story was written by I. S. Johar, who also starred in the film. The foot-tapping music composed by Vinod became a huge hit, with Meena becoming an "icon" for the "new liberated" young women. Meena was acclaimed as the "Lara Lappa Girl", from the song of the same title in the film.

Shorey was one of the first women to be recognised in Indian cinema as a "comedienne of calibre". She was also popularly known as The Droll Queen of Partition as she worked as a comedienne in both in India and Pakistan.

In 1956, she went to Lahore, Pakistan with her husband, where they were invited by Pakistani producer J.C. Anand to make a film there following her mass popularity with the public in both India and Pakistan. The film Shorey made was Miss 56, a copy of the Guru Dutt-Madhubala starrer Mr. & Mrs. '55. Instead of returning to India when her husband did, she decided to stay back in Pakistan, continuing her acting career there. Some of her best films in India included the Punjabi film Chaman (1948), Actress (1948), Ek Thi Ladki (1949), Dholak (1951), and Ek Do Teen (1953).

== Early life ==
Meena was born Khurshid Jehan, on 17 November 1921, in Raiwind, Punjab, British India, the second of four children. Her family was poor and her father struggled to support the family. His first business venture, in Ferozepur, failed when Khurshid was very young. Moving to Lahore, he then worked at a dyeing business, which also failed. However, by this time, he had managed to arrange a good marriage for his eldest daughter, Wazir Begum, and she left for Bombay after her marriage. A few years later, Wazir Begum called Khurshid to stay with her for some time in Bombay, her idea being to arrange a suitable marriage for Khurshid also, from among her husband's relatives.

However, fate took an unexpected turn when Sohrab Modi noticed Meena at the launch of his film Sikandar (1941), which she attended with her brother-in-law, and offered her a supporting role in the film, giving her the name, Meena.

== Career ==
=== In India ===
Ek Thi Ladki ad in Filmindia August 1949

Sikandar in 1941 was the first film Meena acted in, which had her in the small role of King of Taxila's sister. This was a historical film about the invasion of India in the Jhelum region by Alexander (Sikandar). It was directed by Sohrab Modi and starred Prithviraj Kapoor as Sikandar. The film became an all-India hit and provided an instant launching pad for her. She then went on to act as the second lead in three more films under Modi's Minerva Movietone banner, Phir Milenge (1942), Prithvi Vallabh (1943) and Pattharon Ka Saudagar.

Roop K. Shorey, who was based in Lahore, migrated to Bombay and wanted to sign Meena for his film, Shalimar (1946). However Meena had signed a contract with Sohrab Modi, which prevented her from working not only in Shalimar, but also in Mehboob Khan's Humayun (1945). On a visit to Lahore, she was signed by producer Dalsukh Pancholi, for two films Shehar Se Door (1946) and Arsi (1947). She finally freed herself from the contract by taking Modi's wife Mehtab's help, getting the amount of money asked for by Modi, lowered.

In 1948, Chaman (Garden) in Punjabi, was directed by Roop K. Shorey, who having suffered a loss of the family business in Lahore had moved to Bombay following the partition. There he set up his banner Shorey Films and produced the film Chaman with the help of his wife's finances. It had Meena act in the "first post—Partition, Punjabi film in India". It co-starred Karan Dewan, Kuldip Kaur and Majnu, and became a major hit. The melodious music, which was composed by Vinod became instantly popular. One of the famous songs from the film was Chan Kithan Guzari Aai Raat Vey sung by Pushpa Hans and chorus. It was the debut of Pushpa Hans as a singer.

In 1949, came Ek Thi Ladki, produced and directed by Roop K. Shorey, with story written by I. S. Johar. The music was composed by Vinod whose song Lara Lappa Lara Lappa Laayi Rakhdi became the highlight of the film. A trendsetter, the song continued to remain popular over the years. The playback singing was provided by Lata Mangeshkar, and though it's counted as one of Lata's earliest hits, the person mainly remembered for the song is the actress lip-syncing it in the film, Meena, who became "known thereafter as the Lara-Lappa Girl". The film was stated to be the biggest runaway- hit making Roop K. Shorey one of the top comedy film directors.

She acted in Ek Teri Nishani in 1949 opposite Trilok Kapoor and the film also starred I. S. Johar, Cuckoo and Om Prakash. In 1950, she acted in the Karan Dewan Production's Anmol Ratan, with Karan Dewan and Nirmala. Dholak (1951) was produced by Shorey Films and directed by Roop Shorey. It starred Meena with Ajit, with music composed by Shyam Sunder. Shyam Sunder was stated to have given some unforgettable melodies in this film among others. In 1953, in Ek Do Teen, Shorey tried to recreate the magic of Ek Thi Ladki, by continuing with the same "Lara Lappa" theme. Meena was once again paired with Motilal, and music was provided by Vinod. However, the film was unable to have the same effect as Ek Thi Ladki. Her last two films released in India were G. P. Sippy's Shrimati 420 for Sippy Films and Chandu (1958) directed by Majnu and starring Om Prakash, Shashikala, Mehmood and Pran.

=== In Pakistan ===
Roop K. Shorey and Meena were invited to Pakistan by Pakistani film producer J.C. Anand to make a film. Miss 56 (1956) was a plagiarised version of Guru Dutt's Mr. & Mrs. '55 (1955) and starred Meena Shorey, Santosh Kumar, Shamim Ara, and Noor Mohammed Charlie. The music was composed by G. A. Chisti. Meena was well received in Lahore and she decided to stay back when her husband returned to India. She went on to become the "first Pakistani actress to model for Lux" and became known as the "Lux Lady of Pakistan".

Her most famous film was Sarfarosh (1956), in which she had a special character role, with two very popular songs based around her. Originally slated to play the main lead, she was then assigned this side role and carried it off with aplomb. Directed by Anwar Kamal Pasha, the film starred Sabiha Khanum and Santosh Kumar and had music by Rasheed Attre. The film was a superhit box-office success.

Some of the films she acted in a main role were Bara Aadmi (1957), directed by Humayun Mirza in Urdu and co-starring Meena Shorey and Ejaz Durrani, Sitaron ki Duniya (1958), directed by M. H. Mohib, Jagga (1958) in Punjabi and directed by Saqlain Rizvi, Behrupiya (1960) (Punjabi) directed by Aslam Irani. Her other notable films were Mausiqar (1962) directed by Qadeer Ghori, Andhi Mohabbat (1964) and Khamosh Raho (1964) directed by Jameel Akhtar.

== Personal life ==
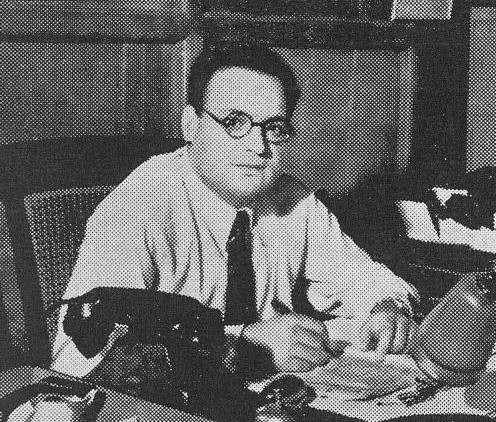
Meena's fourth husband, Roop K. Shorey (picturised in mid-1940s)

Meena is reported to have married five times.

1. Her first marriage was to actor-producer-director Zahur Raja. In Filmindia April 1942, it was mentioned in an interview with Zahur Raja that Zahur and Meena were married for the last "six months". The two met while shooting for Sikandar and fell in love. "Zahur has been married for six months to Meena, a pretty young actress who is at present making probably her last film Phir Milenge".
2. Her second marriage was to actor and co-star, Al Nasir. She separated from him by the mid-40s, and Al Nasir went on to marry the actress Veena. Baburao Patel mentioned him as one of Meena's ex-husbands in a column in Filmindia August 1946, "Al Nasir, the once reported ex-husband of film actress Meena, is now reported to have married film actress Manorama of Punjab".
3. Her third marriage was to Raza Mir, a Pakistani film cinematographer and film producer.
4. Her fourth marriage was to Roop K. Shorey which lasted till 1956. Due to the relative length of the marriage, about 7–8 years, and the fact that she briefly attained success as an actress only in this period, she came to be known by her fourth husband's name. As reported by Filmindia, Meena had converted to Hinduism at the time of wedding. They separated after a successful trip to Pakistan, when Meena decided to remain in that country, while Roop Shorey, a Hindu, stuck to the original plan of returning to India.
5. Her fifth marriage was to Asad Bokhari, her co-star in Jamalo (1962).

Meena had three children including two sons from one of her marriages. Later, she adopted a girl.

== Death ==
In Pakistan, Meena lived a life of poverty towards the end of her life, and had to struggle to survive after 1985–1986. Then Meena went to live with her nephew, and Malika Pukhraj helped her financially. Upon her death, her funeral arrangements were made by charity money. She died on 3 September 1989, in Lahore, Punjab, Pakistan.

== Filmography ==
=== Television ===
Year	Title	Role	Network
1983	Silver Jubilee	Herself	PTV

=== In India ===
List:

Year	Film	Director	Co-stars	Composer	Studio/Producer
1941	Sikandar (Alexander)	Sohrab Modi	Sohrab Modi, Prithviraj Kapoor, Vanmala, Zahur Raja	Mir Saheb, Rafiq Ghaznavi	Minerva Movietone
1941	Nai Roshni	Chimankant Gandhi	Sardar Akhtar, Harish, Meena Kumari, Husn Bano, Amar, Kanhaiyalal	Anil Biswas	National Studios
1941	Bahen	Mehboob Khan	Sheikh Mukhtar, Nalini Jaywant, Meena Kumari, Dulari, Kanhaiyalal, Bhudo Advani	Anil Biswas	National Studios
1942	Phir Milenge	Sohrab Modi	Sohrab Modi, Sardar Akhtar, K. N. Singh	Mir Saheb	Minerva Movietone
1943	Prithvi Vallabh	Sohrab Modi	Sohrab Modi, Durga Khote, Kajjanbai, K. N. Singh, Al Nasir, Vanmala	Rafiq Ghaznavi, Saraswati Devi	Minerva Movietone
1943	Pratiggya	Nandilal Jaswantilal	Swaran Lata, Meena Kumari, Motilal, Veena	Nano Mujamdar	Chitra Productions
1943	Sahara	J. P. Advani (Jagatrai Pesumal Advani)	Renuka Devi, Narang, Pran	Gobind Ram	Vaswani Art Productions
1944	Pattharon Ka Saudagar	Shorey Daulatvi	Al Nasir, Sheela, K. N. Singh	Mir Saheb	Minerva Movietone
1945	Bhai Jaan	S. Khalil	Noor Jehan, Karan Dewan, Anees Khatoon, Shah Nawaz	Shyam Sunder	United Films
1945	Neelam	Essa	Sadhana Bose, Khursheed, Harish	Khan Mastana	A. H. Productions
1946	Shehar Se Door	Barkat Mehra	Raza Mir, Al Nisar, Om Prakash, Ajmal	Amarnath	Pradhan Pictures
1946	Prithviraj Samyogita	Najam Naqvi	Prithviraj Kapoor, Bharat Vyas, Tewari, Sheyama	S.K Pal	Shalimar Pictures
1948	Chaman	Roop K. Shorey	Karan Devan, Om Prakash, Majnu, Kuldip, Gulab, Randhir, Sangeeta, Rameshwar	Vinod	Shorey Pictures
1947	PatJhar	Ronderdovay	Amarnath, Ghulam Qadir, Om Parkash, Cuckoo, Kamal Mehra, Rani Mumtaz, G.N. Butt	Master Ghulam Haider	Pancholi Pictures
1947	Arsi	Daud Chand	Al Nasir, Pran, Cuckoo, Asha Posley	Lachhiram, Shyam Sunder	Jeewan Pictures
1947	Ek Teri Nishani	B. K. Sagar	Trilok Kapoor, Om Prakash, Shyama, I. S. Johar	Amarnath, Sardul Kwatra	Kwatra Art
1948	Actress	Najam Naqvi	Rehana, Prem Adeeb, David, Misra, Abbas Nausha, Mukri	Shyam Sunder	Filmistan
1948	Dukhiyari	D. K. Ratan	Surendra, Trilok Kapoor, Chandra Mohan, Cuckoo	Gyan Dutt	Jeevan Jyot Kala
1948	Chaman	Roop K. Shorey	Meena Shorey, Karan Dewan, Majnu, Shyama	Vinod	Shorey Films
1948	Patjhad (Autumn)	Ravindra Dave	Geeta Bali, Om Prakash, Amarnath	Ghulam Haider, S. D. Batish	Pancholi Art
1949	Ek Thi Ladki	Roop K. Shorey	Motilal, Kuldip Kaur, I. S. Johar, Majnu	Vinod	Shorey Films
1949	Zevaraat	Habib Sarhadi	Yakub, Masood, Jayant	Hansraj Behl	Habib Productions
1950	Anmol Ratan (Rare Jewel)	M. Sadiq	Karan Dewan, Nirmala, Gulab, Gope	Vinod	Dewan Productions
1950	Raj Rani	Satish Nigam	Usha Kiran, Rehman, Satish	Hansraj Behl	Jagat Pictures
1951	Dholak	Roop K. Shorey	Ajit, Majnu, Manmohan Krishna, Yashodhara Katju	Shyam Sunder	Shorey Films
1951	Kale Badal (Black Clouds)	Anant Thakur	Shyam, Pushpa Hans, Jeevan	Shyam Sunder	National Film of India
1952	Ajeeb Ladki	Mohammed Ehsan	Naseem Banu, Rehman, Shashikala	Ghulam Mohammed	Taj Mahal Pictures
1953	Ek Do Teen	Roop K. Shorey	Motilal, Satish, Majnu, Yashodhara Katju	Vinod	Shorey Films
1953	Aag Ka Dariya	Roop K. Shorey	Karan Dewan, Prithviraj Kapoor, Shammi, Majnu	Vinod	Shorey Films
1954	Raman	Hiren Bose	Karan Dewan, Purnima, Om Prakash, Majnu, Cuckoo	Vinod	Metropolitan Films
1955	Jalwa	Roop K. Shorey	Karan Dewan, Begum Para, Majnu, Hari Shivdasani	Vinod	Shorey Films
1955	Shri Naqad Narayan (Money)	K. D. Mehra, I. S. Johar	Motilal, Majnu, Om Prakash, Badri Prasad	Vinod	Kanav Brothers Productions
1956	Shrimati 420	G. P. Sippy	Johnny Walker, Om Prakash	N. Dutta	Sippy Films
1956	Awara Shahzadi	Pyarelal	Daljeet, Malika, Habib, Sheila Ramani, Heera Swant	Nashad	Hind Pictures
1958	Chandu (1958)	Majnu	Om Prakash, Shashikala, Mehmood and Pran	Bipin Babul	N. R. Productions

=== In Pakistan ===
List:

Year	Film	Director	Co-stars	Composer	Studio/Producer
1956	Sarfarosh (side role)	Anwar Kamal Pasha	Sabiha Khanum, Santosh Kumar, Allauddin, Asif Jah	Rasheed Attre	Anwar Kamal Pasha
1956	Bedari (lead actress)	Rafiq Rizvi	Santosh Kumar, Ragni, Ratan Kumar, Qazi Wajid	Ustad Fateh Ali Khan	Film Hayyat
1956	Miss 56 (lead actress)	Roop K. Shorey	Santosh Kumar, Aslam Pervaiz, Shamim Ara, Noor Mohammed Charlie	Ghulam Ahmed Chishti	J.C. Anand
1957	Bara Aadmi (lead actress)	Humayun Mirza	Ejaz Durrani, Allauddin, M. Ismail	Ghulam Nabi, Abdul Latif	Husain D. Silva
1958	Sitaron ki Duniya (lead actress)	M. H. Mohib	Sheda Imam, Rukhsana, Noor Mohammed Charlie	Zafar Khursheed	Sheda Imam
1958	Aakhri Nishan (lead actress)	Ashfaq Malik	Sudhir, Neelo, Nazar, Talish, Allauddin	Rehman Verma	Vaswani Art Productions
1958	Jagga (lead actress, Punjabi)	Saqlain Rizvi	Ilyas Kashmiri, Salim Raza, Zeenat Begum	Ghulam Ahmed Chishti, Rasheed Attre	Faqir Shah
1959	Bacha Jamoora	Aslam Irani	Akmal Khan, Nayyar Sultana, Ilyas Kashmiri, Ajmal	Rafiq Ali	Akbar Irani
1959	Gulshan	Jaffer Malik	Sudhir, Aslam Pervaiz, Allauddin	Rasheed Attre	M. Ghulam Nabi
1960	Behrupia	Aslam Irani	Akmal Khan, Nayyar Sultana, Zarif, Ajmal	Tufail Farooqi	M. Ashiq, M. Taj
1961	Gulfarosh	Zahur Raja	Nayyar Sultana, Zahur Raja, Naeem Hashmi, Kamal	Tassaduq Hussain	Anwar Kamal Pasha
1962	Mauseeqar	Qadir Ghori	Sabiha Khanum, Santosh Kumar, Abbas Nosha, Nusrat Kardar	Rasheed Attre	Rasheed Attre
1962	Jamalo	M. J. Rana	Asad Bukhari, Naghma, A. Shah, Ajmal, Zarif	Ghulam Ahmed Chishti	Wazir Ali
1963	Maa Beti	Choudhary Latif	Yasmin, Yousuf Khan, Akmal Khan, Rukhsana	Safdar Hussain	Choudhary Latif
1963	Teen Aur Teen (3 Aur 3)	Sheikh Iqbal	Habib, Lehri, Jafri, Sheikh Iqbal	Rehman Verma, G. A. Chisti	Rekha Iqbal
1963	Yahudi Ki Ladki	Chawla	Nayyar Sultana, Darpan, Talish	Muslehudin	Saghar Jaffery
1964	Phool Aur Kante	Sheikh Iqbal	Habib, Tarana, Saba, Saqi	M. A. Munoo	M. Ashraf
1964	Khamosh Raho	Jameel Akhtar	Deeba, Yousuf Khan, Mohammad Ali	Khalil Ahmad	T. H. Rizvi
1964	Ghaddar	Riaz Ahmed	Sudhir, Saloni, Mazhar Shah, Mohammad Ali, Firdous, Azad, Nazar	Rehman Verma	Waqar Films
1964	Azad	Dilshad Malik	Santosh Kumar, Bahar, Yousuf Khan, Asad Bukhari, M. Ismael, Allauddin	Rasheed Attre	Fayyaz Malik
1964	Andhi Mohabbat	Amin Malik	Laila, Akmal Khan, Nusrat Kardar, Talish	Manzoor Ashraf	M. Nasim
1964	Khandan	Riaz Ahmad	Akmal, Bahar, Mohammad Ali, Bibbo, Habib, Hina, Naghma, Firdous, Talish, Rekha, Mazhar Shah	Rehman Verma	Riazi Films
1964	Landa Bazar	A. S. Bukhari	Bahar, Asad Bukhari, Asif Jah, Zareen Panna, Talish, Saira Bano, Razia, Zeenat, Rangeela	Tasadduq Hussain	K.B. Films
1964	Waris Shah	S.A. Ashrafi	Bahar, Akmal, Inayat Hussain Bhatt, Nasira, Asif Jah, Sultan Khoost, Zeenat	Master Ashiq Hussain	Delight Pictures
1965	Mujahid	Jameel Akhtar	Sudhir, Mohammad Ali, Sabira Sultana, Deeba, Aslam Parvez, Adeeb, Razia	Khalil Ahmed	Ayaz Film Corporation
1967	Jigri Yaar	Ifikhar Khan	Naghma, Akmal, Allauddin, Sawan, Mazhar Shah, Rangeela, Munawar Zarif	G.A. Chishti	Z.S. Movies
1967	Imam Din Gohavia	M. Saleem	Firdous, Akmal, Yousuf Khan, Mohammad Ali, Sikkedar, Mazhar Shah, Ilyas Kashmiri, Munawar Zarif, Rangeela	G.A. Chishti	Choudhary Films Ltd.
1967	Albela	Wazir Ali	Kemal, Ghazala, Aslam Parvez, Zeenat, Ilyas Kashmiri, Naeem Hashmi, shakir, Nanha, Asad Jafri	Wazir Ali	Zeenat Films
1967	Hamraz	Khawaja Khurshid Anwar	Shamim Ara, Mohammad Ali, Talish, Lehri, Tariq Aziz, Nabeela, Rangeela. Saiqa	Khawaja Khurshid Anwar	Auriga Pictures
1967	Aag	S. Suleman	Zeba, Mohammad Ali, Trannum, Lehri, Aslam Parvez, Tarana, M. Ismael, Talish	Nisar Bazmi	Ali Zeb Productions
1967	Mirza Jatt	Masood Pervaiz	Firdous, Ejaz, Aliya, Munawar Zarif, Mazhar Shah, Ilyas Kashmiri	Rasheed Attray	Ravi Films
1968	Adalat	Hassan Tariq	Zeba, Haidar, Rani, Rukhsana, Aslam Pervaiz, Talish	Tasadduq Hussain	G. S. & Co.
1968	Ham Bhi Parhay Hayn Rahon Mein	Qamar Zaidi	Shamim Ara, Waheed Murad, Sofia Bano, Hani, Andaleeb	Nashad	Saba Fazli
1968	Ek Musafir Ek Haseena	Jameel Akhtar	Nayyar Sultana, Darpan, Nabeela, Adeeb, Lehri, Sabuhi, Zeenat, Salma Mumaz, Adeeb, Sultan Rahi	Khalil Ahmad	Darpan Productions
1968	Mera Babul	Ubaid Qadri	Firdous, Habib, Saloni, Allauddin, Sawan, Munawar Zarif, Rangeela, Asad Bukhari	G.A. Chishti	Nagina Productions
1968	Ik Si Maa	Waheed Dar	Firdous, Habib, Salma Mumtaz, Sawan, Sultan Rahi, Asad Bukhari, Allauddin, Rangeela, Munawar Zarif	Wazir Afzal	Nazir Films
1968	Paristan	Aziz Meeruti	Neelo, Mohammad Ali, Zamarrud, Yousuf Khan, Adeeb, Asad Bukhari, Nazar, Saqi	Rasheed Attray	Citizen Films
1968	Mela 2 Din Da	Aslam Irani	Naghma, Habib, Rangeela, Sawan, M. Ismael, Asad Bukhari, Nabeela, Razia, Zulfi, Nanha	G.A. Chishti	Lovely Films
1968	Murad Baloch	Masood Pervaiz	Firdous, Ejaz, Naheed, Iqbal Hassan, Rangeela, Ilyas Kashmiri, Mazhar Shah	Saleem Iqbal	Punjab Pictures
1968	Naheed	Iftikhar Khan	Deeba, Javed, Sabiha, Rangeela, Aslam Parvez, Saqi, Abbas Nosha, Farida, Nasira	Nashad	Taskin Pictures
1968	Mera Ghar Meri Jannat	Hassan Tariq	Muhammad Ali, Shamim Ara, Rani, Master Murad, Saqi, Talish, Ilyas Kashmiri	Saleem Iqbal	Fimsaz Productions
1969	Nikkay Hundian Da Pyar	Masood Parvez	Naghma, Ejaz, Aliya, Iqbal Hassan, Asif Jah, Munawar Zarif, Ajmal, Tani, Salma Mumtaz	Wajahat Attray	Ravi Films
1969	Tumhi Ho Mehboob Meray	Shabab Keranvi	Deeba, Waheed Murad, Rozina, Saiqa, Qavi, Nanha	M. Ashraf	Shabab Productions
1969	Dard	Zafar Shabab	Deeba, Ejaz, Masood Akhtar, Saiqa, Zeenat, Munawar Zarif	Khawaja Pervaiz	Zafar Arts Productions
1969	Najo	Qadeer Ghori	Firdous, Ejaz Durrani, Aliya, Zeenat Begum, Asad Bukhari	Manzoor Ashraf	S. Sheikh, Qadeer Ghori
1969	Langotia	Aslam Irani	Habib, Naghma, Razia, Sawan, Mazhar Shah	G.A Chishti	Lovely Productions
1969	Dil-e-Betab	Humayun Mirza	Shamim Ara, Mohammad Ali, Rani, Yousuf Khan, Rangeela, Ilyas Kashmiri	Master Inayat Hussain	Eshan Productions
1969	Maa Beta	Hassan Tariq	Rani, Waheed Murad, Sabiha, Santosh Kumar, Masood Akhtar, Saiqa, Rangeela	Sohail Rana	N.T.M Productions
1969	Gabhru Putt Punjab Day	Ubaid Qadri	Naghma, Iqbal Hassan, Rani, Habib, Rangeela, Munawar Zarif, Sultan Rahi, Allauddin	G.A Chishti	Shadab Films
1970	Wichhora	M. Akram	Firdous, Ejaz, Zeenat, Sawan, Ilyas Kashmiri, Asad Bukhari, Munawar Zarif, Farhi	G.A Chishti	Orintial Films
1970	Shama Aur Parwana	Hassan Tariq	Rani, Nadeem, Shabnam, Ejaz, Aliya, Talish, Lehri, Rangeela, Ibrahim Nafees, Zahid Khan, Yasmin Khan	Nisar Bazmi	H.T. Productions
1970	Chann Tay Chakor	Aizaz Syed	Firdous, Habib, Rukhsana, Munawar Zarif, Mazhar Shah, Ilyas Kashmiri, Razia	Safdar Hussain	Glamour Productions
1970	Chann Sajna	Waheed Dar	Rani, Yousuf Khan, Aliya, Iqbal Hassan, Nayyar Sultana, Darpan, Asad Bukhari, Sultan Rahi	Wajahat Attray	Ravi Films
1970	2 Baghi	M. Naseem	Rani, Syed Kemal, Habib, Lehri, Tarana, Aslam Parvez, Ilyas Kashmiri	Mazoor Ashraf	Popular Pictures
1970	Rangu Jatt	Raja Hafeez	Sudhir, Naghma, Habib, Munawar Zarif, Sultan Rahi, Allauddin, M. Ismael, Abbas Nosha, Naeem Hashmi, Nighat Sultana	Master Abdullah	Dachi Films
1970	Sardara	K.H. Zahid	Firdous, Habib, Iqbal Hassan, Sawan, Mazhar Shah, Munawar Zarif, Farzana, Shahida, Seema	M. Ashraf	Aftab Pictures
1971	Raja Rani	Diljeet Mirza	Saloni, Jamal, Aliya, Zahid Khan, Rangeela, Diljeet Mirza, Zeenat, Talish, Salma Mumtaz	Safdar Hussain	A.D. Films
1971	Parai Aag	Raza Mir	Shamim Ara, Nadeem, Masood Akhtar, Asiya, Zamarrud, Sofia Bano, Qavi, Saqi, Asha Posley, Tani	Khawaja Khursheed Anwar	Sadia Hameed
1971	Mali	Waheed Dar	Naghma, Habib, Aliya, Sawan, Munawar Zarif, Asad Bukhari, Khalifa Nazir, Ajmal, Nusrat Ara	G.A. Chishti	Qazi Films
1971	Des Mera Jeedaran Da	Altaf Hussain	Rani, Yousuf Khan, Aliya, Iqbal Hassan, Mazhar Shah, Ilyas Kashmiri, Sultan Rahi	Wajahat Attray	S.I.S. Films
1971	Yaar Des Punjab Day	Iqbal Khashmiri	Nisho, Yousuf Khan, Aliya, Iqbal Hassan, Sabiha, Sultan Rahi, Asad Bukhari, Ilyas Kashmiri, Saiqa, Nanha	G.A. Chishti	Abbas Pictures
1971	Pehlwan Jee in London	Haider Chaudhry	Naghma, Habib, Iqbal Hassan, Zamurrad, Munawar Zarif, Sawan, Nasira	Tafu	Akram Productions
1972	Ucha Shamla Jatt Da	Khanz Aziz	Firdous, Habib, Rozina, Inayat Hussain Bhatti, Sultan Rahi, Sawan, Talish, Nanha, Ali Ejaz, Seema	G.A Chishti	Favorit Films
1972	Doulat Tay Ghairat	Waheed Dar	Naghma, Habib, Aliya, Masood Akhtar, Munawar Zarif, Asad Bukhari, Nasira	Nazar Ali	Union Pictures
1972	Ek Raat	Jameel Akhtar	Deeba, Shahid, Rehana Siddiqui, Sangeeta, Sabiha, Santosh Kumar, Aslam Parvez, Abbas Nosha	Saadat H. Zaidi	Nosha Productions
1973	Pyasa	Hassan Tariq	Rani, Shahid, Qavi, Zamarrud, Qavi, Nayyar Sultana, Zahid Khan, Ilyas Kashmiri	Nisar Bazmi	Sheikh Abdur Rashid
1973	Dukh Sajna Day	N.A Wajee	Firdous, Sudhir, Ghazala, Habib, Rangeela, Asad Bukhari, Sabiha, Ali Ejaz, Changezi, Gotam, Khalid Saleem Mota	Saleem Iqbal	Delight Pictures
1974	Babul Sadqay Teray	Aslam Dar	Aliya, Shahid, Sultan Rahi, Nimmo, Afzaal Ahmad, Khanum, Farah Jalal	Kemal Ahmed	Dar Films
1974	Dunya Gol Hay	Qadeer Ghori	Saiqa, Rangeela, Talish, Sabiha, Qavi, Tamanna, Ishrat Chaudhary, Shehnaz, Changezi	Naushad	Oriental Traders
1974	Zalim Tay Mazloom	K.H. Zahid	Firdous, Habib, Nisho, Iqbal Hassan, Saiqa, Munawar Zarif, Allauddin, Saiqa, Nasira	Wajahat Attray	Taskin Pictures
1975	Nadir Khan	Azmat Nawaz	Firdous, Ejaz, Aliya, Iqbal Hassan, Nayyar Sultana, Darpan, Sawan, Munawar Zarif	Wajahat Attray	Basharat Pictures
1975	Mera Naa Patay Khan	Masood Pervez	Neelo, Shahid, Munawar Zarif, Babra Sharif, Ishrat Chaudhary, Meena Shori, Afzaal Ahmad, M. Ismael, Asif Jah, Mehboob Kashmiri	Bakhshi Wazir	S.M. Ali
1975	Wehshi Jatt	Hassan Askari	Asiya, Sultan Rahi, Iqbal Hassan, Ghazala, Afzaal Ahmad, Ilyas Kashmiri, Ajmal, Jaggi Malik, Seema, Ali Ejaz, Fazal Mehmood	Safdar Hussain	Malik Pictures
1976	Waada	Aslam Dar	Asiya, Waheed Murad, Deeba, Saiqa, Lehri	Kemal Ahmad	Asghar Joora
1976	Zubaida	Aslam Dar	Nisho, Waheed Murad, Babra Sharif, Aslam Parvez, Lehri, Rangeela, Sabiha Khanum	Master Rafiq Ali	Daar Sons Movietune
1978	Bohat Khoob	Jan Mohammad Jamman	Najma, Shahid, Asiya, Najma Mehboob, Aslam Parvez, Fozia Durrani, Khalid Saleem Mota, Mirza Shahi, Saqi, Romana, Hanif, Jalil Afghani, Tamanna	Nazar Ali	J.J. Productions
1978	Mehman	Pervez Malik	Babra Sharif, Afshan Qureshi, Nayyar Sultana, Rahat Kazmi, Nighat Sultana	M. Ashraf	Pak Film Enterprises
1979	Tarana	Zafar Shabab	Waheed Murad, Rani, Ghulam Mohiuddin, Bahar Begum, Bindiya, Tamanna	M. Ashraf	Zafar Art Productions
1979	Nei Tehzeeb	Agha Hassan Imtesal	Rani, Shahid, Babra Sharif, Usman Pirzada, Nanha, Bahar, Afzaal Ahmad, Nayyar Sultana, Asifa, Seema	M. Ashraf	Atif Saleem Film International
1979	Nishani	Jamshed Naqvi	Shabnam, Waheed Murad, Qavi, Tariq Aziz, Naini, Saiqa, Nayyar Sultana, Aslam Parvez	Jozi Anjum	S.A.J Films
1983	Nazra	Zaheer Ahmad Naqsh	Aasia, Yousuf Khan, Najma Mehboob, Ilyas Kashmiri, Afzaal Ahmad	M. Javed	Shoeib Khan

== Awards and recognition ==
Year	Award	Category	Result	Title	Ref.
1982	Nigar Award	For 30 Years of Excellence	Won	Contribution to Cinema	
