= Roop K. Shorey =

Indian film director (1914–1973)

Roop Kishore Shorey
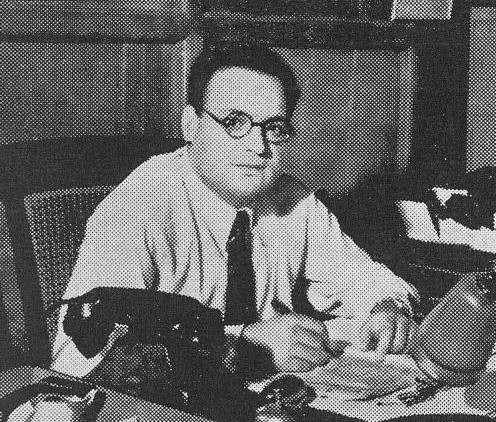
- Shorey c. mid-1940s
- Born: January 28, 1914; Quetta, Balochistan, British India
- Died: June 3, 1973 (aged 59); Bombay, Maharashtra, India
- Occupations: Director; film producer
- Years active: 1931–1971
- Organisation: Shorey Films
- Spouses: Savitri (m. 1944); Meena Shorey (m. 1949; sep. 1956)
- Father: Roshan Lal Shorey

Roop Kishore Shorey (28 January 1914 – 3 June 1973) was an Indian film director and producer. Film historian Sanjit Narwekar credits Shorey as one of the directors who delivered a "lasting contribution" to comedy films during the post-independence era.

== Life and career ==
Roop Kishore Shorey was born on 28 January 1914, in Quetta, Balochistan, in British India. His father Roshan Lal Shorey was one of the pioneering figures of Punjabi film industry; he founded Kamla Movietone in 1924 and initially produced government-sponsored short films and documentaries before moving into feature film production.

=== Early career and breakthrough (1929–1939) ===
Shorey began his filmmaking career in 1929 with the comedy Unlucky Loves, made in collaboration with his college friend Harold Lewis as a leading actor. The film did not receive a commercial release. Shorey became more active in his career in the early 1930s, when he joined Kamala Movietone as a processing technician and cameraman, and later rose to become an editor and laboratory chief.

In 1935, Shorey made his directorial debut with Majnu, a parody of the folklore of Layla and Majnun, again starring Lewis in the titular role; Lewis subsequently adopted Majnu as his screen name. According to film historian Sanjit Narwekar, the film, packed with motorcycle stunts, railway-track rescue sequence and further special effects, was a unique experience for North Indian audiences. A review by The Bombay Chronicle called Majnu a "good, wholesome and exciting" picture and commended Shorey for his work.

Shorey's subsequent projects in the decade included Tarzan Ki Beti (1938), a commercial success that was also internationally distributed in Australia, and the thriller Khooni Jaadugar (1939), which was also released as City of Silence.

=== Success in Lahore (1940–1945) ===
During the early 1940s, Shorey expanded his father's production enterprise, and according to film historian Mushtaq Gazdar, "attained the status of a movie mogul" in Lahore. He adapted regional folklores in the Punjabi films Dulla Bhatti and Sohni Mahiwal (both 1940). In the musical Mangti (1942), Shorey launched the career of actress Mumtaz Shanti and also established Zeenat Begum and Shamshad Begum as prominent singers. Mangti is considered the first Punjabi golden jubilee success of Indian cinema.

In 1944, at Daska, Punjab, Shorey had his first wedding with Savitri, with whom he remained married till death.

Shorey subsequently joined an Indian film industry delegation to the United Kingdom and the United States to study filmmaking techniques in 1945. During the visit in UK, the delegation toured Hollywood studios, including Paramount Pictures, to observe production techniques. Later they visited US to attend the attend a session of Motion Picture Engineers. In October, Shorey announced plans to expand into Hollywood with a bilingual colour production on the life of Omar Khayyam, to be starring both Indian and American actors.

=== Setbacks: Partition and migration to Bombay (1946–1948) ===
Among Shorey's final Lahore productions was Shalimar (1946), a historical drama starring Begum Para and Chandra Mohan. Its production began at Shorey Studios in Lahore and was eventually completed in Bombay. On 24 August 1946, a fire caused by a faulty electrical fuse destroyed part of Shorey Studios, causing losses estimated at several lakh rupees and destroying two films then under production.

Within a month, the Shoreys rebuilt their studio, now located on Multan Road, with modern facilities and equipment imported from the US. The Tribune reported that the new Shorey studios had "emerged in greater glory" and was the largest film studio in the East at the time. Before production at the new studio could begin in earnest, it was attacked and burned during the Partition riots of 1947, forcing the Shorey family to leave Lahore. The studio was burnt down during the ensuing communal violence. (Note: Post-partition, the burnt down studio was alloted to Pakistani director Shaukat Hussain Rizvi.)

Shorey and his family migrated to Bombay following Partition. He reunited with actress Meena, who had previously worked with him in Koel (1943), and directed her and Karan Dewan in Chaman (1948)—the first Punjabi-language film of the newly independent India. It proved to be a financial success. In 1948, Shorey set up his new production company, Shorey Films, in Bombay.

=== Ek Thi Larki and marriage to Meena Shorey (1949–1956) ===
In 1949, under his new banner, Shorey directed Meena alongside Motilal and Majnu in the screwball comedy Ek Thi Larki, which revolves around an orphan (played by Meena) fleeing from two men blackmailing her for a murder she did not commit. During its filming in Kashmir, Shorey and his team gave a stage performance for Indian Army personnel serving there. During this time, Shorey and Meena's frequent public appearances together led to audiences often sending fan mail inquiring about their relationship.

Ek Thi Larki became a critical and commercial success upon its release in late 1949; one of its songs "Lara Lappa" was so popular that it earned Meena the lifelong nickname of the "Lara Lappa Girl". Contemporary reviewers were positive, with The Times of India hailing the film as a triumph in "rollicking slapstick comedy", and Baburao Patel of Filmindia remarking that Shorey has "put down a new milestone for the industry by providing it with its first true slapstick farce."

In the wake of Ek Thi Larki's release, Shorey and Meena were married in 1949 following a proposal from his side. As he was already married, the wedding took place in Calcutta because of Bombay's anti-bigamy laws, with the ceremony being conducted according to Arya Samaj rites. Meena converted from Islam to Hinduism and became known off-screen as Kiran Shorey.

Continuing from their success in Ek Thi Larki, Shorey and Meena produced a series of comedies including Dholak (1951), Ek Do Teen (1953), and Jalwa (1955). These films became known for their slapstick humour and fast-paced comic style, often getting described by then-critics as "noisy stunt comedies" and "fast entertainers". Ek Do Teen, a continuation of the "Lara Lappa theme", was reported by The Times of India to be the most popular film among Bombay audiences in April 1953.

In 1956, Shorey and his wife returned to Lahore, Pakistan, to direct J. C. Anand's Miss 56, a remake of the Indian comedy Mr. & Mrs. '55. The project came in the wake of Pakistan's restrictions on the import of Indian films following the 1954 "Jaal agitation", which encouraged local film production and created opportunities for visiting Indian filmmakers. Miss 56 performed well commercially upon its release, but marked the end of Shorey's marriage with Meena as she chose to remain in Pakistan after production. Her decision deeply affected Shorey, who subsequently returned to India alone. Gazdar wrote, "Shorey was never again the man he used to be."

=== Later films and death (1957–1973) ===
Returning to Bombay, Shorey continued his career throughout the 1960s, directing films including Ek Ladki Saat Ladke (1961), Aplam Chaplam (1961), Main Shaadi Karne Chala (1962), and Akalmand (1966). His final film was the English–Hindi bilingual Ek Thi Reeta (1971), aimed at American audiences.

Shorey died on 3 June 1973 in Bombay.

== Filmography ==
=== Short films ===
Shorey directed more than fifty short films early in his career. Among them was Our Northern Cousins: Life and Customs in a Village of the Punjab, an 11-minute documentary produced by Ezra Mir.

=== Feature films ===
Year	Film	Language	Notes	Ref.
1935	Majnu	Hindi		
1938	Tarzan Ki Beti	Hindi		
1939	Khooni Jadugar	Hindi	Also known as City of Silence and Shaher-eKhamosha	
1940	Dulla Bhatti	Punjabi		
1940	Ik Musafir	Hindi	Co-directed by Roshan Lal Shorey	
1941	Himmat	Hindi		
1942	Nishani	Hindi		
1942	Mangti	Punjabi		
1943	Koel	Hindi		
1945	Din Raat	Hindi		
1946	Shalimar	Hindi		
1948	Chaman	Hindi	Punjabi	
1949	Ek Thi Larki	Hindi		
1951	Dholak	Hindi		
1951	Mukhda	Hindi		
1953	Aag Ka Dariya	Hindi		
1953	Ek Do Teen	Hindi		
1955	Jalwa	Hindi		
1956	Miss 56	Urdu	Pakistani film	
1961	Ek Ladki Saat Ladke	Hindi		
1961	Aplam Chaplam	Hindi		
1962	Main Shaadi Karne Chala	Hindi		
1966	Akalmand	Hindi		
1971	Ek Thi Reeta	Hindi and English (bilingual)		

== Reception and legacy ==
Film historian Sanjit Narwekar credits Shorey as one of the directors who delivered a "lasting contribution to the comic genre" during the post-independence era.

Scholar Salma Siddique devoted a chapter of Evacuee Cinema: Bombay and Lahore in Partition Transit, 1940–1960 (2022; Cambridge University Press) to Shorey's collaborations with Meena and their post-Partition comedy films, arguing that they constituted a body of refugee cinema shaped by migration, displacement and the cultural aftermath of Partition.

== Sources ==
- Abbasi, Yasir (2018). Yeh Un Dinoñ Ki Baat Hai: Urdu Memoirs of Cinema Legends. Bloomsbury Publishing. ISBN 9789387471054.
- Gazdar, Mushtaq (1997). Pakistan Cinema, 1947–1997. Oxford University Press. ISBN 9780195778175.
- Gokulsing, K.; Dissanayake, Wimal (2013). Routledge Handbook of Indian Cinemas. Routledge. p. 166. ISBN 9781136772917.
- Narwekar, Sanjit (1994). Directory of Indian Film-makers and Films. Flicks Books. ISBN 9780948911408.
- Narwekar, Sanjit (2005). Eena Meena Deeka: The Story of Hindi Film Comedy. Rupa & Company. ISBN 9788129108593.
- Rajadhyaksha, Ashish; Willemen, Paul (1999). The Encyclopedia of Indian Cinema. British Film Institute. ISBN 9780851706696.
- Siddique, Salma (2022). Evacuee Cinema: Bombay and Lahore in Partition Transit, 1940–1960. Cambridge University Press. ISBN 9781009175524.
- Thorpe, Frances; Pronay, Nicholas (1980). British Official Films in the Second World War: A Descriptive Catalogue. Clio Press. ISBN 9780903450270.
