= Chaman (film) =

1948 Indian film

- Directed by: Roop K. Shorey
- Produced by: Jaimini Dewan
- Starring: Karan Dewan; Meena Shorey
- Music by: Vinod
- Release date: 1948
- Country: India
- Language: Punjabi

Chaman is a 1948 Indian Punjabi-language film directed by Roop K. Shorey, and produced by Jaimini Dewan. The film is described as the first post-Partition Punjabi film of India released on 6 August 1948 at Ratan Cinema, Lahore.

It also marked Shorey's first film produced in Bombay, where he had shifted post-Partition, made in collaboration with his future wife, actress Meena.

Set in Lahore, Chaman starred Karan Dewan in the titular role, alongside Meena as Shanti, a Punjabi woman who seeks revenge after her father's defeat in local elections but falls in love with a member of the rival faction. Supporting cast included Kuldip Kaur and Majnu; and the film's soundtrack was composed by Vinod.

Both Chaman as well as its soundtrack were well received by audiences, and the film was a box office hit. It was reported to have a successful theatrical run in several cities including Lahore — where it celebrated a silver jubilee — as well as Delhi, Rawalpindi, and Amritsar; the Indian newspaper The Bombay Chronicle described it as "perhaps most popular Punjabi picture ever produced".

Encouraged by the success, Shorey further directed Meena in films such as Ek Thi Larki (1949) and Ek Do Teen (1953).

The film also proved to be a breakthrough for actor-comedian Om Prakash.

== Cast ==
According to Asian Film Directory And Whos Who (1952):

- Karan Dewan as Chaman
- Meena Shorey as Shanti
- Kuldip Kaur
- Majnu
- Om Prakash
- Gulab
- Randhir
- Sangeeta
- Rameshwar
- Kathana
- Shivraj
