= Roshan Lal Shorey =

Indian filmmaker and studio executive (1890s–1978)

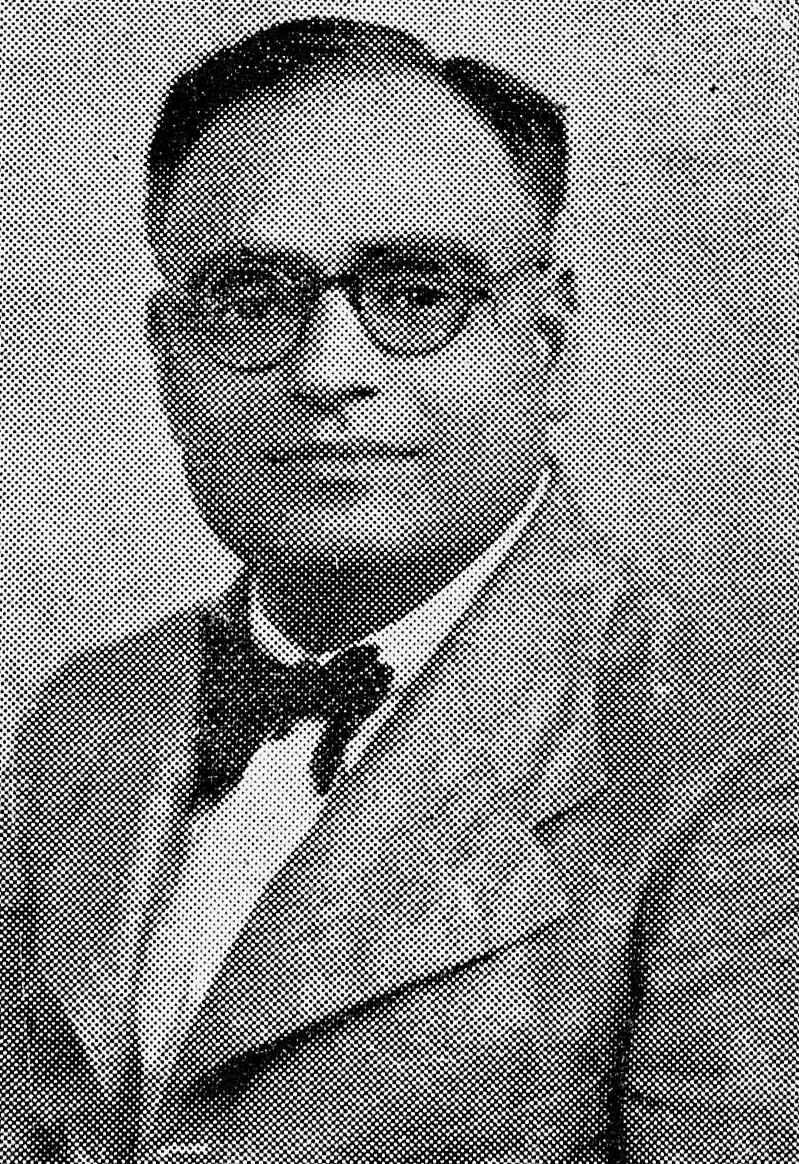
- Shorey c. mid-1940s
- Born: 1890 / 1897; Lahore, British India
- Died: October 1978; Bombay, Maharashtra, India
- Occupations: Filmmaker; studio executive
- Years active: 1921–1958
- Children: Roop K. Shorey (son)

Roshan Lal Shorey (1890 or 1897 – October 1978) was an Indian filmmaker and studio executive. Film historian Gautam Kaul refers to him as an pioneer of short film in India, while academic Rachel Dwyer identifies him and his son Roop K. Shorey as the key figures of the pre-independence Lahore film industry. After studying filmmaking and photography in the United States and working for the Fox Film Corporation, he returned to British India in 1921 to begin his career in silent documentaries and newsreels. Among his notable early works were films covering key Indian National Congress sessions, the 1923 kar sewa at Amritsar, and Mahatma Gandhi's 1930 Salt March.

Shorey played a foundational role in building the film infrastructure of Lahore. He established early production companies and studios, including the Punjab Film Corporation and Shorey Studios, the latter with his son. In the 1930s, Shorey transitioned to feature films and helped introduce talkies to Lahore, directing and producing Radhe Shyam (1932), one of India's earliest sound films. Following the Partition of India in 1947, he documented the refugee crisis in Millions On The Move (1948) while relocating to Bombay, later spending his final working years with the Government of Punjab in Shimla, and other organisations.

== Life and career ==
Shorey was born in Lahore, British India, in either 1890 or 1897. (Note: Birth years attributed to Sanjit Narwekar, and Gautam Kaul, respectively.) He initially worked in the photolithography department of the Military Staff College in Quetta, Balochistan. After graduating, Shorey travelled to the United States, where he studied filmmaking and photography; he received training in New York City and earned a diploma of merit in motion picture production. He then worked as a cameraman for the Fox Film Corporation.

Returning to India in 1921, Shorey began his filmmaking career in the silent-film era; his work was mostly sponsored by the Government of British India. He produced documentary films such as Criminal Tribes and Their Reform and Awakening of the Sleepy Hollow (on the Kangra Valley railway extension). In 1923, The Golden Temple authorities commissioned him to film the kar sewa at Amritsar.

Shorey founded Kamala Movietone in Lahore in 1924. Two years later, he established the Punjab Film Corporation (PFC), a fully equipped studio in Lahore where he served as technical director. Conceived as a government-supported organisation that provided facilities for nearly forty registered production companies, PFC played an important role in the development of the early Punjabi film industry.

During the late 1920s, Shorey covered several Indian National Congress sessions, notably at Gaya, Calcutta, Karachi and Lahore. In 1930, he was sent by the Punjab Government to film Mahatma Gandhi's Salt Movement, which film historian Gautam Kaul describes as the high point of Shorey's documentary career. In addition to this work, Shorey was also invited by several princely rulers to film state functions.

Shorey turned to feature filmmaking in the early 1930s, with his first production Kismet ke Here Phere (1931), a silent comedy with "suspense, stunts and thrills". In the early 1930s, Shorey became one of the early filmmakers who introduced sound films in Lahore, alongside Dalsukh M. Pancholi. His first sound film was Radhe Shyam (1932), a Hindu mythological film that was shot in Bombay. It is regarded as one of India's earliest talkies. His eldest son, Roop Kishore, assisted his father before making his directorial debut with Majnu (1935). The father-son duo established Shorey Studios in Lahore, equipping it with modern facilities and equipment.

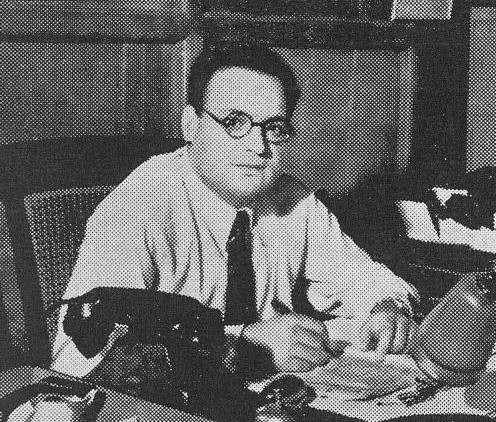
Shorey's son, Roop Kishore, who expanded his father's production enterprise

Shorey later made films such as Swarg Ki Seedhi (1935) and Ik Musafir (1940). Beginning in 1942, Shorey Pictures grew into what The Encyclopaedia of Indian Cinema describes as "a major financier and distributor of post-independence Hindi film", with Roop serving as its in-house director. During the Partition of India in 1947, Shorey and his son migrated to Bombay, while he filmed the documentary Millions On The Move.

In his later years, Shorey moved to Shimla, where he worked for the Government of Punjab from 1948 to 1955. He also made films for several organisations including Information Films of India, Films Division of India, Technical Co-operation Mission and the Government of Afghanistan. Shorey died in October 1978 in Bombay, Maharashtra, India.

== Filmography ==
=== Documentary and short films ===
According to Sanjit Narwekar's work A Directory of Indian Documentary (1998):

Year	Film	Language	Notes
1922	Criminal Tribes of India		
1923	Kar Sewa		
1930s	Himalayan Wool		
1941	Awakening of Sleepy Hollow		
1944	Land of the Five Rivers		
1944	Singing Punjab		
1948	Millions on the Move		
1948	Refugee		
1949	Punar Jeevan	Hindi	
1949	Ishq-O-Dosti	Persian	
1949	Jashan Ishtaqlal	Persian	
1949	Kabul		
1950	Good and Bad Garden		
1951	Progressive Punjab		
1952	Progressive Uttar Pradesh		
1952	Grow More Food		
1952	Kulu: The Happy Valley		
1953	Jal Shakti		
1953	Labour Welfare		
1953	Plant Protection		
1953	Enemies of Our Lives		
1954	Community Projects		
1954	Road to Tibet		
1954	Jail Sudhar		
1954	Nangal Dam		
1955	Thal Mein Jal		
1956	Govind Sagar		
1956	Harijan		
1956	Electricity		
1956	How to Make Better Gur		
1956	Hamare Ban		
1956	Criminal Tribes		
1958	Kal Ke Nagarik		

=== Feature films ===
==== As director ====
Year	Film	Language	Notes	Ref.
1931	Kismet Ke Here Phere	Silent	Shorey's first feature film	
1931	Across The River	Silent		
1932	Radhe Shyam (also released as Zulm-i-Kans)	Hindi	One of India's earliest talkies; co-directed with A. P. Kapur	
1935	Swarg Ki Seedhi (also known as Sati Vimala)	Hindi		
1939	Sohni Mahiwal	Punjabi	Produced by Kamala Movietone	
1939	Puran Bhagat	Punjabi		
1940	Ik Musafir	Punjabi	Co-directed with Roop K. Shorey	

== Sources ==
- Chabria, Suresh; Usai, Paolo Cherchi (1994). Light of Asia: Indian Silent Cinema, 1912-1934. Wiley Eastern. p. 188. ISBN 9788122406801.
- Dwyer, Rachel (2002). Yash Chopra: Fifty Years In Indian Cinema. Lotus Collection. ISBN 9788174362346.
- Gazdar, Mushtaq (1997). Pakistan Cinema, 1947–1997. Oxford University Press. ISBN 9780195778175.
- Kaul, Gautam (1999). Cinema and The Indian Freedom Struggle: Covering the Subcontinent. Sterling Publishers.
- Narwekar, Sanjit (1998). A Directory of Indian Documentary. Mumbai International Film Festival for Documentary, Short & Animation Films.
- Siddique, Salma (2022). Evacuee Cinema: Bombay and Lahore in Partition Transit, 1940–1960. Cambridge University Press. ISBN 9781009175524.
- Rajadhyaksha, Ashish; Willemen, Paul (1999). The Encyclopedia of Indian Cinema. British Film Institute. ISBN 9780851706696.
