= Jalwa (1955 film) =

1955 Indian film

- Directed by: Roop K. Shorey
- Produced by: Roop K. Shorey
- Starring: Meena Shorey; Karan Dewan
- Music by: Vinod
- Release date: 1955
- Country: India
- Language: Hindi

Jalwa is a 1955 Indian Hindi-language film directed and produced by Roop K. Shorey. The film features Meena Shorey and Karan Dewan in leading roles, and Majnu among its supporting cast. The music for Jalwa was composed by Vinod and lyrics were penned by Aziz Kashmiri.

== Cast ==
- Meena Shorey
- Karan Dewan
- Majnu

== Music ==
The music for Jalwa was composed by Vinod, and lyrics were penned by Aziz Kashmiri.

== Release and reception ==
The film was passed by the Central Board of Film Censors on 27 July 1955, and later released on 16 September 1955 in Bombay, India.

A critic for The Times of India negatively reviewed it as "a disappointingly mediocre picture".
