= Malangi =

Malangi may refer to:

- Malangi (bandit), dacoit or a bandit during the colonial occupation of Punjab, British India
- Malangi (film), a 1965 Pakistani biographical and musical film
