= Majnu (1935 film) =

1935 Indian film

- Directed by: Roop K. Shorey
- Produced by: Roop K. Shorey
- Starring: Harold Lewis; Shyama Zutshi
- Cinematography: Roop K. Shorey
- Music by: Ghulam Haider
- Release date: 1935
- Country: India
- Language: Hindi

Majnu is a 1935 Indian Hindi-language film directed, produced, and photographed by Roop K. Shorey. It marked the debuts of Shorey as a director, and of Ghulam Haider as music composer. A parody of the legend of Layla and Majnun, the film starred Harold Lewis in the title role, after which Lewis adopted "Majnu" as his screen name.

== Cast ==
- Harold Lewis as Majnu
- Shyama Zutshi
- M. L. Mattu
- Asgar Beg

== Production ==
Majnu was one of Shorey's earlier noted films made in pre-Partition Lahore. Shorey initially used to assist his father, Roshan Lal Shorey, before making his directorial debut with Majnu. The film starred his friend Harold Lewis in the title role, after which Lewis adopted "Majnu" as his screen name.

Also produced and photographed by Shorey, Majnu was a parody of the legend of Layla and Majnun. Film historian Sanjit Narwekar notes that the film featured motorcycle stunts, railway-track rescue sequences—"a popular screen pastime of those days"—and further special effects.

== Music ==
The music of Majnu was composed by debutant Ghulam Haider. According to The Bombay Chronicle, singer Mukhtar Begum lent her voice to several ghazals in the film; one of these ghazals was described as possibly the last composition of Agha Hashar Kashmiri.

== Reception ==
In a contemporary review, The Bombay Chronicle wrote that Majnu was drawing "crowded houses" at Globe Talkies, Bombay, and praised its combination of comedy and stunt sequences. The newspaper further commended the actors and director Roop K. Shorey, describing the film as "good, wholesome and exciting".
