= Majnu (actor) =

Indian actor and director (1913–1975)

- Born: Harold Lewis; November 2, 1913; Amritsar, Punjab, British India
- Died: March 26, 1975 (aged 61); Bombay, Maharashtra, India
- Occupations: Actor; director
- Years active: 1929 – early 1970s
- Relatives: Imad ud-din Lahiz (grandfather); George W. Lewis (brother)

Harold Lewis (2 November 1913 – 26 March 1975), known professionally as Majnu, was an Indian actor and director.

He was a frequent collaborator of director Roop K. Shorey and was known for portraying comic sidekicks, sometimes with morally ambiguous traits, in Shorey's films.

Majnu was the grandson of Indian preacher Imad ud-din Lahiz, who had converted from Islam to Christianity. Majnu's family was Punjabi Christian and based in Amritsar. His brother was the badminton player George W. Lewis.

Majnu began his career by co-directing and acting in Shorey's production Unlucky Loves (1929), although the film was not commercially released. He gained widespread recognition for playing the titular role in the comedy Majnu (1935), a parody of Layla and Majnun. The film was a critical and commercial success and inspired him to adopt "Majnu" as his screen name.

Majnu subsequently appeared in both Hindi- and Punjabi-language films, including Himmat (1941), Shalimar (1946), Chaman (1948), Ek Thi Larki (1949), and Ek Do Teen (1953). He also ventured into film direction with Paapi (1943) and went on to direct more than ten films until 1960, including Badnami (1946).

== Acting credits ==
Year	Title	Role	Notes	Ref.
1929	Unlucky Loves		Also director; did not receive a commercial release	
1931	Kismet Ke Here Phere		Silent film	
1935	Majnu	Majnu		
1939	Khuni Jadugar			
1941	Himmat			
1941	Nishani			
1945	Din Raat			
1946	Badnami		Also director	
1946	Shalimar			
1948	Chaman			
1949	Ek Thi Ladki	Mohan		
194?	Do Saudagar			
1950	Putli			
1951	Sabz Baagh			
1951	Dholak			
1951	Mukhda			
1952	Zamane Ki Hawa			
1952	Shrimatiji			
1953	Ek Do Teen	Hiralal		
1955	Jalwa			
1955	Shri Naqad Narayan			
1956	Hum Sab Chor Hain			
1958	Chandu		Also director	
1959	Bhangra			
1959	Madam X. Y. Z.			
1960	Return of Mr. Superman			
1964	Jagga	Bansa		
1966	Chaddian Di Doli			
1968	Mere Huzoor	Train passenger		
1971	Haseenon Ka Devata	Bhola		

== Directorial credits ==
Year	Title	Banner	Language	Notes	Ref.
1929	Unlucky Loves		—	Silent film co-directed by Roop K. Shorey; did not get a commercial release	
1943	Paapi		Hindi		
1946	Humari Galiyan	Shorey Studios	Hindi	Incomplete film being made in Lahore; abandoned due to migration to Bombay	
1946	Badnami	Punjab Film Corporation	Hindi		
1954	Vanjara		Punjabi		
1955	Son of Ali Baba		Hindi		
1955	Tatar Ka Chor		Hindi		
1956	Baghi Sardar		Hindi		
1956	Basre Ki Hoor		Hindi		
1956	Mallika		Hindi		
1957	Muklawa		Punjabi		
1958	Chandu	Chitra Niketan / N. R. Productions	Hindi		
1960	Pagdi Samhal Jatta		Punjabi		
