= Aag Ka Dariya =

1953 Indian Hindi Language Film

- Directed by: Roop K. Shorey
- Written by: Aziz Kashmiri
- Screenplay by: Roop K. Shorey
- Story by: Roop K. Shorey
- Produced by: Roop K. Shorey
- Starring: Karan Dewan; Prithviraj Kapoor; Meena Shorey; Manju; Shammi; Uma Dutt; Johnny Walker
- Cinematography: T. R. Joshi
- Edited by: Pran Mehra
- Music by: Vinod
- Distributed by: Shorey Films
- Release date: 1953
- Country: India
- Language: Hindi

Aag Ka Dariya (lit. 'River of Fire') is a 1953 Indian Hindi-language black-and-white film directed by Roop K. Shorey and starring Karan Dewan, Prithviraj Kapoor, Meena Shorey, Shammi, Uma Dutt; Johnny Walker, Manju and Cecil. Playback singer for this movie was Talat Mahmood. Produced by Shorey Films, it had music by music composer Vinod.

Aag ka Dariya is a melodramatic love story, where the lovers separate due to the machinations of a villain. They keep crossing each other's paths, eventually meeting when the final drama plays out.

== Cast ==
- Karan Dewan
- Prithviraj Kapoor
- Meena Shorey
- Johnny Walker
- Uma Dutt
- Manju
- Cecil
- Seema Kapoor
- Shammi

== Soundtrack ==
Music was composed by Vinod, with lyrics by Aziz Kashmiri. One song, "Ek Dil Hazaar Gham", sung by Talat Mehmood, had lyrics written by Hasrat Jaipuri. The playback singers were Asha Bhosle, Mohammed Rafi, Talat Mahmood, Sulochana Kadam, Lakshmi Roy, Khan Mastana.

=== Song list ===
Song	Singer
"Log Kehte Hain Mujhe Haazir Jawab"	Mohammed Rafi, Khan Mastana
"Ja Chali Ja O Ghata, More Piya Ka Sandesa Na Suna"	Mohammed Rafi, Asha Bhosle
"Kehta Tha Zamana, Magar Humne Na Mana" (Duet)	Mohammed Rafi, Asha Bhosle
"Kehta Tha Zamana" (Solo)	Asha Bhosle
"Kat Jayegi Jawani"	Asha Bhosle
"Mohe Par Lag Jaye"	Asha Bhosle
"Samajh Na Duniya Ko Ghar Khushi Ka, Yahan Pe Thokar"	Asha Bhosle, Lakshmi Roy
"Rut Barkha Ki Aayi, Koyaliya Kuk Uthi, Mera Man Huk Uthi"	Asha Bhosle, Sulochana Kadam
"Tu Ud Ja Panchhi Bawre, Ja Dekh Thikane Ja"	Sulochana Kadam, Talat Mahmood
"Ek Dil, Hazaar Gham"	Talat Mahmood
