= Zeenat Begum =

Pakistani singer

- زینت بيگم
- Born: Shamim Akhtar; 11 November 1931; Malerkotla, Punjab, British India
- Died: 11 December 2007 (aged 76); Lahore, Punjab, Pakistan
- Other name: Queen of Yesteryear
- Occupations: Playback singer; Actress; Producer
- Years active: 1942 – 2007
- Spouses: Abdul Jabbar (m. 1949; div. 1955): Saqlain Rizvi
- Children: 1

Zeenat Begum (born Shamim Akhtar; 11 November 1931 – 11 December 2007), sometimes known as Zeenat, was a Pakistani singer. She was known as The Queen of Yesteryear for singing songs in films and on radio.

== Early life ==
Zeenat Begum was born Shamim Akhtar on 11 November 1931 into a family of musicians at Malerkotla, Punjab, British India.

== Music career ==
Zeenat Begum was a tawaif and a renowned classical singer. She was discovered by Pandit Amar Nath around 1937. Her first success as a playback singer came when she sang for Govind Ram's Punjabi film Mangti (1942) and she also made her debut as an actress in the film. The film was marked as the first Golden jubilee film produced in Lahore.

Her first Hindi film was Nishani (1942). She sang for other notable films including Panchhi (1944), Shalimar (1946), Shehar se Door (1946) and Daasi (1944).

Zeenat Begum relocated from Lahore to Bombay in 1944. She sang for several music directors in Bombay, including younger brothers of Pandit Amar Nath – Pandit Husnlal Bhagatram, Master Ghulam Haider, Pandit Gobind Ram, etc. The last film she sang for in India was Mukhda (1951). She migrated to Pakistan and joined Lahore station of Radio Pakistan and worked there until the late 1950s. After the independence of Pakistan in 1947, many new playback singers arrived in Pakistan which affected the playback singing career of Zeenat Begum. Though she remained a prominent singer of Radio Lahore in the 1950s and 1960s.

== Personal life ==
Zeenat married Abdul Jabbar in 1949. They divorced in 1955. She married Saqlain Rizvi later and they had one child together.

== Death ==
She died on 11 December 2007 in Lahore, Pakistan.

== Filmography ==
=== Film ===
Year	Film	Language
1942	Nishani	Hindi
1942	Mangti	Punjabi
1943	Sahara	Hindi
1944	Daasi	Hindi
1944	Chand	Hindi
1944	Panchhi	Hindi
1944	Gul Baloch	Punjabi
1945	Champa	Hindi
1946	Kahan Gaye	Hindi
1946	Shehar se Door	Hindi
1946	Rehana	Urdu
1946	Shalimar	Hindi
1946	Khush Naseeb	Hindi
1948	Teri Yaad	Urdu
1949	Ek Thi Larki	Hindi
1949	Kaneez	Hindi
1949	Pheray	Urdu
1950	Jahad	Urdu
1950	Hamari Basti	Urdu
1950	2 Aansoo	Urdu
1950	Shammi	Punjabi
1951	Mukhda	Hindi
1951	Eid	Urdu
1951	Ghairat	Urdu
1951	Billo	Punjabi
1952	Shola	Urdu
1952	Nath	Punjabi
1953	Sailab	Urdu
1953	Ilzam	Urdu
1963	Ik Tera Sahara	Urdu
1970	Naya Savera	Urdu
1975	Mohabbat Zindagi Hai	Urdu
