= Dhadkan =

Dhadkan (lit. 'heartbeat') may refer to:

- Dhadkan (1946 film), a Bollywood film
- Dhadkan (2000 film), an Indian romantic drama film
- Dhadkan (2017 film), an Indian Bhojpuri action-romance-comedy film
- Dhadkan (TV series), a 2002 Indian medical drama

== See also ==
- Dharkan, 1972 Indian film
- Dharkan (TV series), 2016 Pakistani television series
