= Akalmand (1966 film) =

1966 Indian film

- Directed by: Roop K. Shorey
- Written by: I. S. Johar
- Starring: Kishore Kumar; I. S. Johar
- Music by: O. P. Nayyar
- Release date: November 11, 1966
- Country: India
- Language: Hindi

Akalmand is a 1966 Hindi-language comedy film directed by Roop K. Shorey. It starred Kishore Kumar and I. S. Johar, with both of them cosplaying as women; according to scholar Alka Pande, the film depicted "an exaggerated caricature of women".

== Cast ==
- Kishore Kumar
- I. S. Johar
- Sonia Sahni
- Praveen Chaudhary
- Kamal Kapoor

== Music ==
The music for Akalmand was composed by O. P. Nayyar.

== Release ==
Akalmand was released on 11 November 1966, in Bombay.

== Reception ==
A review published in The Illustrated Weekly of India described Akalmand as "a laugh-jerker all the way". It further noted:

This "action comedy", though plagiarised by writer I. S. Johar from nearly a dozen foreign films of the Bond ilk, moves at a racy pace, thanks to veteran director Roop K. Shorey recapturing in it his impish elan as a purveyor of slapstick. With things happening before you can say Ek Do Teen, there is not a dull moment. In the topsy-turvydom that is Shoreydom, just about everything is grist to the mill, with the story being but a whisky peg for the director to hang his frothy ideas on.
