= Radhe Shyam (1932 film) =

1932 Indian film

- Directed by: Roshan Lal Shorey; A. P. Kapur
- Produced by: Kamala Movietone
- Starring: See below
- Release date: 1932
- Country: India
- Language: Hindi

Radhe Shyam is a 1932 Indian Hindi-language mythological film directed by Roshan Lal Shorey and A. P. Kapur. The film was shot in Bombay. Also released as Zulm-i-Kans ("The Oppression of King Kans"), it was one of the earliest talkies of Indian cinema.

Radhe Shyam was produced by the Lahore-based production house Kamala Movietone, which was founded by Shorey in 1924. The film marked Shorey's transition from government-sponsored films to feature film production.

== Cast ==
The film's cast includes:

- Mohan
- Radha
- J. N. Dar
- Sumita Devi
- D. N. Madhok
- Gangaprasad
- Khurshid
