= Return of Mr. Superman =

- Directed by: Manmohan Sabir
- Produced by: Manmohan Sabir
- Starring: Paidi Jairaj; Sheila Ramani; Naazi; Shammi; Majnu; Helen; David
- Music by: Anil Biswas
- Distributed by: Manmohan Films
- Release date: 1960
- Country: India
- Language: Hindi

Return of Mr. Superman is a 1960 Indian Hindi-language superhero film directed by Manmohan Sabir. It is an unauthorized retelling of the origins of Superman.

== Plot ==
Finding a young child in the wreckage of a strange aircraft, a farmer and his wife raise the boy as their own. Growing up to become a newspaper reporter, he takes on a double life of a super hero when smugglers threaten the peace.

== Cast ==
- Paidi Jairaj
- Sheila Ramani
- Naazi
- Helen
- Majnu

== Soundtrack ==
1. "Dekh O Baabu Dekh Dil Ki Dukaan" - Meena Kapoor
2. "Dil Hamko Dhoondhata Hai" - Meena Kapoor, Suman Kalyanpur
3. "Dil Milaate Jaaiye Nazaren Milaate Jaaiye" - Meena Kapoor
4. "Ek To Hoon Main Haseen Baabu" - Meena Kapoor
5. "Kisiko Yoon Tumnnaon Mein" - Meena Kapoor
6. "Muhabbat Kisko Kehte Hain" - Mubarak Begum
7. "Stella O Stella Tera Jaani Tha Ab Tak Akela" - Meena Kapoor, Mahendra Kapoor
8. "Tu Haseen Hai Tu Jawaan Hai" - N/A
