= Sewa (film) =

- Directed by: Dhirubhai Desai
- Starring: Zahur Raja; Shanta Kumari
- Music by: S.N. Tarpathi
- Release date: 1942
- Country: India
- Language: Hindi

Sewa (film) is a Bollywood film. It was released in 1942.

== Cast ==
- Zahur Raja
- Shanta Kumari
- Anwari Begum
- Abdur Rehman Kabuli
- Hadi
- Shyam Sunder
- Parbhashkar
- Anwar
- Prabhashankar
- Bulbulay
- Radha Rani
