= Himmat (1941 film) =

- Directed by: Roop K. Shorey
- Written by: Aziz Kashmiri
- Starring: Ragni; Beg; Majnu; Manorama; Radha
- Music by: Pandit Gobindram
- Distributed by: Kamal Movietone
- Release date: 1 January 1941
- Country: India
- Language: Hindi

Himmat is a 1941 Bollywood Hindi film. It starred Manorama, Radha and Ragni. The film features the first-ever version of the popular song "Inhi Logon Ne", sung by Shamshad Begum. This song was then used in the 1943 film Aabroo and was sung by yesteryear comic actor Yakub. "Inhi Logon Ne" gained popularity and recognition from the 1972 film, Pakeezah, in which it was sung by Lata Mangeshkar, and picturised on Meena Kumari.
