= Jagga (film) =

1964 film

- Directed by: Jugal Kishore
- Screenplay by: Manohar Singh Sehrai
- Story by: Daljeet
- Based on: based on the story of real-life 20th-century dacoit Jagga Jatt
- Produced by: K.B. Chadha
- Starring: Dara Singh; Tiger Joginder Singh; Indira Billi; Mumtaz Begum; Amar nath Sarla Chopra; Khairati; Jugal Kishore; Majnu; Moolchand; Kartar Singh; Habans Bapy
- Music by: Ustad Allah Rakha
- Release date: 1964
- Country: India
- Language: Punjabi

Jagga is a 1964 Indian Punjabi-language film, directed by Jugal Kishore, starring Dara Singh, Indira, Khairati, Amarnath, Jugal Kishore, Majnu, and more.

== Awards ==
It is based on the story of real-life 20th-century dacoit Jagga Jatt. This movie won the National Film Awards in 1964 for Punjabi-language films - (President's Silver Medal for Best Feature film).

== Cast ==
- Dara Singh as Jagga
- Indira Billi as Nimmo
- Jugal Kishore (film's actor and director) as Puran Singh police inspector
- Manju as Bansa
- Mumtaz Begum as mother
- Moolchand as Jagga gang member
- Kharaiti as Bhmbbri
- Swarn Dada as Pindet
- Kartar Singh as Sikh police saphi
- Mamaji as Karmaa Shah
- Harbans Papey as Jagga gang member ( He is very famous music composer, choreographer and actor known for his work in Hindi and Punjabi films )
- Khattana
- Brahm Bhardwaj as Moti Ram
- Lala Nazir as Banta Singh
- Baldev Mehta
- Krishna Duggal
- Saudagar Singh
- Tiger Jeet Singh
- Amarnath as Police DIG

== Music ==
Music was by Ustad Ala Rakha, Lyrics by Manohar Singh Sehrai, and film songs sung by Mohammad Rafi, Shamshad Begum, Minoo Purshottam, S. Balbir

(1) Mera Baanka Desh- ਮੇਰਾ ਬਾਂਕਾ ਦੇਸ਼

(2) Jeh Main Jaandi | ਜੇਹ ਮੈਂ ਜਾਂਦੀ

(3) Jeh Main Jaandi | ਜੇਹ ਮੈਂ ਜਾਂਦੀ
