= Jadoo (1951 film) =

- Publicity still from Jadoo
- Directed by: A. R. Kardar
- Written by: Jagdish Kanwal; Zahur Raja; S. N. Banerji
- Story by: S. N. Banerji
- Produced by: A. R. Kardar
- Starring: Nalini Jaywant; Suresh; Shyam Kumar
- Cinematography: Dwarka Divecha
- Edited by: G. G. Mayekar; Iqbal
- Music by: Naushad
- Production company: Kardar Productions
- Distributed by: Musical Pictures Ltd.
- Release date: 1951
- Running time: 137 minutes
- Country: India
- Language: Hindi

Jadoo (Magic) is a 1951 Hindi psychosocial melodrama film directed by A. R. Kardar. The story writers were S. N. Bannerji and Jagdish Kanwal, with dialogues by Zahur Raja and Bannerji. The music director was Naushad, with lyrics by Shakeel Badayuni. This was the second to last film in which Naushad was to be the music director for Kardar. After an association of fourteen films, Naushad composed one last time for Kardar in Deewana (1952). Prior to this Kardar had already approached composer S. D. Burman for Jeewan Jyoti (1953). A "Musical Pictures Ltd." presentation, the film starred Nalini Jaywant, Suresh, Shyam Kumar, Sharda, and Ramesh.

The film revolves around a young singer and dancer, Sundari, who is involved with crooks, but falls in love with a police constable, Pritam. The plot of the film was inspired from The Loves of Carmen (1948), directed by Charles Vidor and starring Rita Hayworth.

== Plot ==
Sundari, a hot-tempered young woman makes her living as a stage dancer and singer. She appears to lead a trouble-free, fun amoral life. Pritam (Suresh) is a constable. When the two meet, they fall in love. Sundari is arrested for a brawl, where she attacked a woman. Pritam lets her escape, but gets into trouble with his superior. Sundari steps forward and asks Pritam to be forgiven. Pritam soon finds out that Sundari is in fact a member of a gang of thieves. Their leader Rahu who is in jail at present, considers Sundari his property. Pritam gets involved in the shady dealings along with Sundari and he is soon hunted by the police. The film ends with Pritam shooting Sundari, and getting shot by the police himself.

== Cast ==
- Nalini Jaywant as Sundari
- Suresh as Havaldar Pritam
- Shyam Kumar
- Ramesh
- Sharda
- Amanullah
- E. Billimoria
- Krishna Kumar
- Nawab
- Amir Banu

== Soundtrack ==
The music was composed by Naushad and the lyricist was Shakeel Badayuni. Church music was used for the background score in Jadoo as well as for Dastan (1950). The singers were Mohammed Rafi, Lata Mangeshkar, Shamshad Begum, Zohrabai Ambalewali.

=== Songlist ===
#	Title	Singer
1	"Pyar Ke Sagar Se Nikli"	Mohammed Rafi
2	"Ulajh Gaya Jiya Mera Nainon Ke Jaal Me"	Lata Mangeshkar
3	"Gin Gin Taare Main Haar Gai Raat Ko"	Lata Mangeshkar
4	"Lo Pyar Ki Ho Gayi Jeet"	Lata Mangeshkar
5	"Insan Badalte Rehte Hain"	Lata Mangeshkar
6	"Jab Nain Milein Nainon Se, Laaraa Lu "	Shamshad Begum
7	"Ek Do Tin Chaar, Roop Ki Dushman Paapi Duniya"	Shamshad Begum
8	"Ae Ji Thandi Sadak Hai Thandi Sadak"	Shamshad Begum
9	"Lelo Lelo Phuldani Lelo"	Shamshad Begum, Zohrabai Ambalewali, Mohammed Rafi
