= Sidhupur =

- Village
- Location in Punjab, India Sidhupur (India)
- Coordinates: 31.1445534°N 75.2067241°E
- Country: India
- State: Punjab
- District: Jalandhar
- Tehsil: Nakodar

Government
  - Type: Panchayat raj
  - Body: Gram panchayat
- Elevation: 240 m (790 ft)

Population (2011)
  - Total: 773
- Sex ratio 378/395 ♂/♀

Languages
  - Official: Punjabi
- Time zone: UTC+5:30 (IST)
- ISO 3166 code: IN-PB
- Vehicle registration: PB- 08
- Website: jalandhar.nic.in

Sidhupur is a village in Nakodar in Jalandhar district of Punjab State, India. It is located 23 kilometres (14 mi) from Nakodar, 31 kilometres (19 mi) from Kapurthala, 45 kilometres (28 mi) from district headquarter Jalandhar and 186 kilometres (116 mi) from state capital Chandigarh. The village is administrated by a sarpanch who is an elected representative of village as per Panchayati raj (India).

== Demography ==
As of 2011, the village has a total number of 158 houses and a population of 773 of which include 378 are males while 395 are females according to the report published by Census India in 2011. The literacy rate of the village is 83.90%, higher than state average of 75.84%. The population of children under the age of 6 years is 71 which is 9.18% of total population of the village, and child sex ratio is approximately 543 lower than the state average of 846.

Most of the people are from Schedule Caste which consists 17.32% of total population in the village. The town does not have any Schedule Tribe population so far.

As per census 2011, 224 people were engaged in work activities out of the total population of the village which includes 189 males and 35 females. According to census survey report 2011, 99.55% workers describe their work as main work and 0.45% workers are involved in marginal activity providing livelihood for less than 6 months.

== Transport ==
Nakodar railway station is the nearest train station. The village is 92 kilometres (57 mi) away from domestic airport in Ludhiana and the nearest international airport is located in Chandigarh also Sri Guru Ram Dass Jee International Airport is the second nearest airport which is 96 kilometres (60 mi) away in Amritsar.

== See also ==
- List of villages in India
- Jagga Jatt
