= Chaddian Di Doli =

- Directed by: Lal Singh Kalsi
- Written by: Lal Singh Kalsi
- Produced by: Rangi and Sood
- Starring: See below
- Music by: Vedpal Verma
- Release date: 1966
- Country: India
- Language: Punjabi

Chaddian Di Doli is a 1966 Punjabi film made in Bombay, Calcutta, India. It was released in 1966 and the cast includes I. S. Johar as hero, Helen, Manmohan Krishan, Majnu, Manju, and Naseem Banu (mother of Saira Bano). The film was written and directed by Lal Singh Kalsi and the producers were Rangi and Sood. Dharmendra was signed for the lead role and paid advance money but he later returned the money because of dates problem with his schedule. Phool Aur Patthar with O.P. Ralhan started filming and went on to become a hit for him shortly after.

== Cast ==
- I. S. Johar
- Helen
- Manmohan Krishan as Father
- Majnu
- Manju
- Naseem Banu
- Mirza Musharraf
- Partap
- Kishan
- Urvashi
- Shukla
- Kamla
- Thirath Ram
- Suresh
- K C Sharma
