= Burj Ran Singh =

Burj Ran Singh بر ج رن سنگھ
- village
- Location within Pakistan
- Coordinates: 30.9367°N 74.1371°E
- Country: Pakistan
- Province/State: Punjab
- District: Kasur
- Tehsil: Chunian
- Elevation: 186 m (610 ft)
- Time zone: UTC+05:00 (PST)

Burj Ran Singh (Punjabi: ਬੁਰਜ ਰਣ ਸਿੰਘ, Shahmukhi and Urdu: بر ج رن سنگھ), also spelled as Burj Ran Singh Wala, is a village in the Chunian Tehsil of Kasur District in West Punjab (Pakistan). It is named after third Chief of Nakai Misl Sardar Ran Singh Nakai.

== Geography ==
Burj Ran Singh is located at 30.9367°N 74.1371°E in the Chunian Tehsil of Kasur District in Punjab, Pakistan. During British rule it used to fall under Lahore District.

== Notable people ==
- Jagga Jatt, a heroic rebel of Punjab, and a social bandit

== See also ==
- Toba Tek Singh
- Punjab region
- Lahore
