= Ek Do Teen (film) =

1953 comedy film

- Directed by: Roop K. Shorey
- Written by: Krishan Chander
- Produced by: Roop K. Shorey
- Starring: Motilal; Meena Shorey; Yashodra Katju; Majnu; Iftekhar
- Cinematography: T. R. Joshi
- Edited by: Pran Mehra
- Music by: Vinod
- Release date: 1953
- Running time: 120 minutes
- Country: India
- Language: Hindi

Ek Do Teen is a 1953 Hindi comedy film produced and directed by Roop K. Shorey.

It stars Motilal, Meena Shorey, Yashodra Katju, Majnu and Iftekhar. The story, screenplay and dialogues were written by Krishan Chander. The story has some similarity to Somerset Maugham's Facts Of Life. The music was composed by Vinod and the lyricist was Aziz Kashmiri.

The film was a follow-up to Ek Thi Ladki (1949), which was directed by Roop K. Shorey and starred his wife Meena Shorey with Motilal. Meena Shorey emerged as a fine comedian and was called the "Lara Lappa" girl from the song composed by Vinod and picturised on her in Ek Thi Ladki. However, Ek Do Teen did not do as well and was a turning point in Shorey's career.

Ek do teen (one two three) is the number of caveats passed on by Motilal's father to him before the father dies. The hero experiences each one of the three cautions only to find his father's dying homily to be true.

== Plot ==
Roma (Meena Shorey) is on her way home after celebrating with her friends at Asha's (Yashodra Katju) place when she is attacked by two robbers who try to steal her purse. She faints as one of them brandishes a knife. Motilal (Motilal) and his friend Hiralal (Majnu) are driving through there and scare away the robbers. After wondering what to do with the unconscious woman, they take her to Moti's house to render treatment. Roma makes a phone call to her father Seth Madanlal (K. N. Dhar) to tell him her whereabouts, but he is too angry to know the reason why she is there except to ask her the address. On arriving and seeing her with two men, he gets angry and starts shouting, which wakes up Motilal's father Seth Ramlal (Romesh Thakur) and he appears downstairs. The two fathers fight loudly and Roma is taken away by her father.

Roma and Motilal fall in love with each other and want to marry. Roma's father finally agrees to the wedding. Motilal's father is in poor health and dying so the marriage is postponed. Before dying, Seth Ramlal calls his son and tells him to avoid three things in life. First, never to drink alcohol, second, not to associate with women of loose morals, and third, never to tell a secret to a woman. Having given his sermon, the father dies. Motilal goes through the first two and realises what his father meant as he gets into trouble. For the third caveat, Motilal stages a drama about murdering his friend with his help and tells Roma about it. Roma tells her friend Asha. Asha tells her husband, who is in the police. Moti is arrested and the friend has disappeared. Roma goes through a lot of action, but finally manages to save Motilal.

== Cast ==
- Motilal: Motilal
- Meena Shorey: Roma
- Yashodra Katju: Asha (Roma's friend)
- Majnu: Hiralal (Motilal's friend)
- Iftekhar: Asha's husband
- Kaushalya
- Satish Batra
- Shamlal
- Romesh Thakur: Seth Ramlal (Motilal's father)
- K. N. Dhar: Seth Madanlal (Roma's father)
- Khatana
- Indra Bansal

== Soundtrack ==
Roop K. Shorey used music composer Vinod and lyricist Aziz Kashmiri once again after Ek Thi Larki.

Song	Singer
"Aaya Hai Saawan Ka Mast Mahina"	Asha Bhosle
"Tumhe Chupke Se Dil Mein Liya Hai Basa"	Mohammed Rafi, Asha Bhosle
"Mile Nain Se Nain Toh Dil Mein"	Asha Bhosle, Minal Wagh, Pramodini Desai
"Aaja Re Baalam, Tujhe Meri Kasam"	Sandhya Mukherjee
"Jiya Hai Udaas"	Geeta Dutt
"Piya Jo Bulaaye"	Asha Bhosle, Mohammed Rafi
"Ek Do Teen Houn Toh Karoon Aitbaar"	Asha Bhosle
"Lo Phir Chand Nikal Aaya"	Asha Bhosle
"Thumak Yhumak Chali"	Asha Bhosle, G. M. Durrani
"Chal Meri Gadiye Tu Chhuk Chhuk Chhuk"	Mohammed Rafi, Minal Wagh, Asha Bhosle
