= Chandu (1958 film) =

1958 film

- Poster
- Directed by: Majnu
- Produced by: Roop K. Shorey
- Starring: Mehmood Ali; Om Prakash; Pran Krishan Sikand; Shashikala Om Prakash Saigal; Gope; Meena Shorey
- Music by: Bipin Babul; Raja Mehdi Ali Khan; Raj Baldev Raj (Lyrics)
- Production company: N. R. Productions
- Release date: 1 January 1958
- Country: India
- Language: Hindi

Chandu is a 1958 film directed by Majnu. It stars Mehmood, Om Prakash, Pran Krishan Sikand, Shashikala Om Prakash Saigal and Gope. The film's music was composed by Bipin Babul and the lyrics were by Raja Mehdi Ali Khan, Kaifi Azmi and Raj Baldev Raj.

== Cast ==
- Mehmood Ali
- Om Prakash
- Pran
- Shashikala
- Gope
- Sunder
- Satish Batra
- Khwar Jama
- Meena Shorey
- Majnu
- Gulab
- Haroon
- Daljeet

== Soundtrack ==
#	Title	Singer(s)
1	"Gore Gore Galon Pe Kala Yeh Teel"	Geeta Dutt, Mohammed Rafi
2	"Dhol Dhappa Dhayi Dhappa"	Mohammed Rafi
3	"Babuji Mujhe Dil Mein Chhupa Lo"	Asha Bhosle
4	"Bheegi Bheegi Channi Hain"	Asha Bhosle, Mohammed Rafi
5	"Do Nain Milakar Matwale"	Asha Bhosle, Agha Sarwar
6	"Nina Bina Natkhat Mina"	Shamshad Begum
