= Anmol Ratan =

1950 film

Anmol model
- Directed by: M. Sadiq
- Written by: D. N. Madhok
- Produced by: Jaimani Dewan
- Starring: Karan Dewan; Meena Shorey; Nirmala; Gope
- Cinematography: Ratanlal Nagar
- Music by: Vinod
- Distributed by: Dewan Productions
- Release date: 1950
- Country: India
- Language: Hindi

Anmol Rattan (Rare Jewel) is 1950 Indian Hindi-language drama film directed by M. Sadiq. The film was produced by Jaimani Dewan for his Dewan Productions banner, with music composed by Vinod.

The film starred Karan Dewan, who was known as a "jubilee star" with most of his films becoming box-office successes. He was the younger brother of producer Jaimani Dewan. Karan's co-stars were Meena Shorey (credited, as she was in all her films, as just Meena), Nirmala, Gope, Madan Puri and Gulab.

The story was written by D. N. Madhok, who also wrote the lyrics and screenplay. Karan Dewan plays an idealistic struggling writer, who is waiting for his book to be published. His love interest was played by Meena.

== Cast ==
- Karan Dewan
- Meena Shorey (as Meena in credit roll)
- Madan Puri
- Gope
- Nirmala

== Review ==
Anmol Rattan's review was titled "M. Sadiq's Insipid Direction". The film was called a "worthless picture" from Jaimini Dewan, "there was nothing anmol about it". The director M. Sadiq, and story writer D. N. Madhok, came in for harsh criticism stating that they had "insulted all cinegoers" by making this film. The photography by Ratanlal Nagar was praised as "the only man who has done his job well", as was actor Gope in his comic role "the only artiste who gave a good performance".

== Music ==
The soundtrack was composed by Vinod, with lyrics by D. N. Madhok. Vinod used Talat Mehmood in Anmol Rattan as Talat's first venture in Hindi films. However, since Arzoo (1950) was released earlier the credit of Talat's first song goes to composer Anil Biswas for the song "Ae Dil Mujhe Aisi Jagah Le Chal". The popularity of that ghazal had Vinod choose Talat for one more film Wafa (1950). Playback singers included Talat Mahmood, Lata Mangeshkar, Nirmala and Asha Bhosle.

=== Songlist ===
| # | Title | Singer |
|---|---|---|
| 1 | "Jab Kisi Ke Rukh Pe Zulfein Aake Lehrane Lagi" | Talat Mehmood |
| 2 | "Shikva Tera Main Gaaoon" | Lata Mangeshkar, Talat Mehmood |
| 3 | "Yaad Aane Wale Phir Yaad Aa Rahe Hai" | Lata Mangeshkar, Talat Mehmood |
| 4 | "Dard Mila Hai Tere Pyar Ki Nishani" | Lata Mangeshkar |
| 5 | "Mere Ghunghat Mein Do Nain Pukare" | Lata Mangeshkar |
| 6 | "Sajan Aaye Aadhi Raat" | Lata Mangeshkar |
| 7 | "More Dwar Khule Hain Aane Waale Kab Aaoge" | Lata Mangeshkar |
| 8 | "Taare Wohi Hain Chaand Wohi Hai" | Lata Mangeshkar |
| 9 | "Koi Kah Do Balamua Se Uth Nahi Jaye" | Nirmala |
| 10 | "Laakhon Mein Ek Hamaare Saiya Hain" | Nirmala |
| 11 | "Kaale Kaale Badalo Mein Pani" | Asha Bhosle |
