= Pattharon Ka Saudagar =

- Directed by: Shorey Daulatvi
- Produced by: Minerva Movietone
- Starring: Al Nasir; Sheela; Meena Shorey; K. N. Singh
- Music by: Mir Saheb
- Release date: 1944
- Country: India
- Language: Hindi

Pattharon Ka Saudagar is a Bollywood film. It was released in 1944. It was directed by Shorey Daulatvi for Sohrab Modi's Minerva Movietone banner. The music was composed by Mir Saheb and the film starred Al Nasir, Sheela, Meena Shorey, K. N. Singh, Jilloobai and Sankatha Prasad.
