= Zahur Raja =

Pakistani actor

- Born: 7 July 1918; Abbottabad, British India
- Died: 28 August 1993 (aged 75); Lahore, Pakistan
- Resting place: Lahore
- Other name: A Rough Neck Guy
- Education: Government Gordon College
- Occupations: Actor; Singer; Writer; Director; Producer
- Years active: 1939 - 1993
- Spouse: Meena Shorey (m. 1941; div. 1942)
- Children: 4

Zahur Raja was an actor, producer, director and singer in Indian and Pakistan Cinema. He was known for his roles in films Mirza Sahiban (1939), Pooja (1940), Sikandar (1941), Badil (1942), Sewa (1942), Mazaaq (1943), O Panchhi (1944), Panchhi (1944), Bhai (1944), Ghazal (1945), Anmol Ghadi (1946).

== Early life ==
He was born into an Abbasi family on 7 July 1918 in Lora, Abbottabad, during the British Raj. His father, Raja Sultan Khan, served as an inspector of police in Rawalpindi. His family was granted the title of "Raja" by the British government, which subsequently became their surname. He had three brothers—Raja Ajab Khan, Raja Ashraf Khan, and Raja Ghafoor Khan—and two sisters. Zahur remained in Abbottabad until his teenage years, relocating to Rawalpindi to attend Government Gordon College after completing his matriculation. While in college, he was an avid sportsman and became the campus champion in discus throw, though his primary passion lay in acting.

As a member of the college's Dramatic Society, his performances caught the attention of the principal, who later recommended Zahur for the film industry in his final report. During his college years, Zahur frequently sent letters and photographs of himself to various film directors. Although he received some replies, none resulted in concrete opportunities. His father, Raja Sultan Khan, subsequently sent him to Dehradun to join the Indian Army as a lieutenant; however, Zahur chose to travel to Bombay instead to pursue acting.

== Career ==
He went to Abdur Rashid Kardar with a letter which he sent during his college days. Director Kardar then hired him in Kardar Productions later he cast Zahur in lead role in Punjabi film Mirza Sahiban with popular actress Zubeida and Sahiba it was a hit movie at the box office. Then V. Shantaram took Zahur at Prabhat Film Company and he signed a contract for three years.

Due to some reasons he had trouble with the film story to understand and so he wasn't able to act in the picture and he didn't got work for ten months then director Kardar took Zahur to National Studios and he immediately cast Zahur in lead role in his film Pooja. The story, inspired by The Old Maid (1939) by Warner Pictures, was about sisters and his role was of Darpan a rejected suitor of the older sister and later rapes the youngest sister who gets pregnant, starring with Sardar Akhtar and Sitara Devi the film was a massive hit and he also made his debut as a singer in the film.

Then he got many offers by many companies and then joined Minerva Movietone. He worked in lead roles in film Sikandar the film was directed by Sohrab Modi and written by Sudarshan starring with Meena Shorey, K. N. Singh, Vanamala and Prithviraj Kapoor the film was a massive hit at box office. After the success of his three films then he signed a contract with Ashok Pictures and worked in film Sewa. Then he learned directing and started his own production company with the help of Mr R. S. Lakhani who was his financing partner.

In 1942 he directed his productions film Badil in which he also acted and later he directed film Khayyam which was about a Persian poet.

== Personal life ==
He first married his co-star actress Meena Shorey in 1941. They met during film Sikandar and it was a first love for both of them but the marriage didn't last long and it ended in divorce in 1942. Later Zahur then married a Children's radio host at BBC in England in 1956 and had four children.

== Death ==
He died at Lahore in August 1993 at aged 75.

== Filmography ==
=== Film ===
Year	Film	Language
1939	Mirza Sahiban	Punjabi
1939	Pyam-e-Haq	Hindi
1940	Pooja	Hindi
1941	Sikandar	Hindi
1942	Sewa	Hindi
1942	Badil	Hindi
1943	Mazaaq	Hindi
1944	O Panchhi	Hindi
1944	Panchhi	Hindi
1944	Bhai	Hindi
1945	Ghazal	Hindi
1946	Dhadkan	Hindi
1946	Anmol Ghadi	Hindi
1950	Jahad	Urdu
1951	Jadoo	Hindi
1959	Gumrah	Urdu
1960	Khyber Mail	Urdu
1961	Ghazi Bin Abbas	Urdu
1961	Gulfarosh	Urdu
1964	Deevana	Urdu
1966	Baghi Sardar	Urdu
1966	Koh-e-Noor	Urdu
1968	Asmat	Urdu
