= Shyama Zutshi =

Indian actress

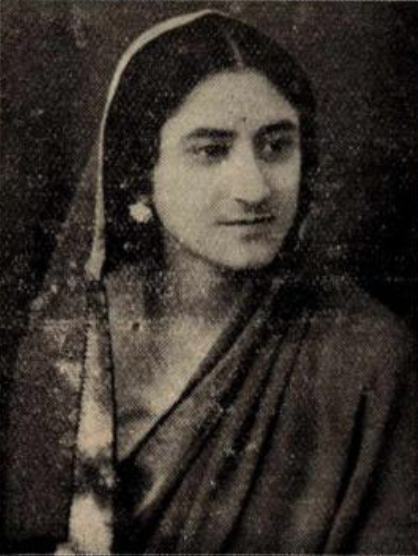
- Shyama Zutshi, from a 1938 issue of The Indian Listener
- Born: Shyama Zutshi; 8 February 1910; Anand Bhavan, Allahabad, India
- Died: 1953 (aged 42–43)
- Occupations: Actress, Freedom fighter
- Years active: 1934–1936
- Children: Bittoni, born in 1947 and died in 2009.
- Parent(s): Pandit Ladli Prasad Zutshi (father); Lado Rani (mother)(Only daughter of Pandit Jivan Lal Tikku)
- Relatives: See Nehru-Gandhi family

Shyama Zutshi (8 February 1910 – 1953) was a Bollywood actress who was the first Kashmiri woman who joined films in 1934.

== Early life ==
Shyama Zutshi was born at the Anand Bhavan in Allahabad. She was the daughter of Barrister Pandit Ladli Prasad Zutshi who was the only son of Patrani (Sister of Motilal Nehru). She was admitted to Sacred Heart Convent School, Lahore by her mother Lado Rani. She was fluent in English, Gujarati, Marathi, Urdu, Kashmiri and Hindi. She was also proficient in horse riding, singing and dancing.

== Career and personal life ==
After passing her BA examination Shyama Zutshi joined Hindi cinema. Her first movie was Shiv Bhakti (1934). She later acted in many films like Majnu (1935) and Khooni Jadugar (1939). Her major hit was Karwan-E-Hayat (1935) in which she acted with K. L. Saigal, T. R. Rajakumari, Pahari Sanyal, and Rattan Bai.

She became a very successful actress, but with the influence from her elder sister Manmohini she moved out from films and focused on politics and freedom struggle. Another reason for Shyama Zutshi to quit films was the advice from a fellow Kashmiri actor Chander Mohan Wattal who was a close friend of Zutshi family. According to Chander acting in films was not meant for girls from good families like Kashmiri Pandits. So Chander Mohan Wattal always opposed the entry of Kashmiri girls to films. Later Shyama became a Women Congress leader and a frontline freedom fighter influenced by Gandhi's non-violent struggle along with her mother and three sisters (Chandra Kumari, Manmohini and Janak) . After some time Lado Rani arranged the marriage of Shyama in a well off Chopra family. She became Shyama Chopra after marriage.
