= Badnami =

- Directed by: Majnu
- Starring: Geeta Bali; Asha Posley; Zubeida; Balraj Sahni; Zubeida Begum; Pran; Manorama
- Release date: 1946
- Country: India
- Language: Hindi

Badnami (lit. 'Infamy') is an Indian Hindi-language film directed by Majnu. It was released in 1946.

== Cast ==
- Geeta Bali
- Asha Posley
- Zubeida
- Balraj Sahni
- Zubeida Begum
- Pran
- Manorama
- Ramlal
