= Jagga Jatt =

20th century Sikh bandit

- Born: Jagat Singh; 1901/1902; Burj Ran Singh, Lahore District, British India (now Kasur District, Pakistan)
- Died: 1930/1931 (29 years old)
- Other names: Jagga Daku
- Known for: Robbing from the rich and giving to the poor
- Spouse: Inder Kaur (d.1983)
- Children: Gulab Kaur, later renamed to Resham Kaur
- Parent(s): Makhan Singh and Bhagan

Jagga Jatt (or Jagga Daku), originally named Jagat Singh, was a notable social bandit in 20th-century Punjab. He is often remembered as the "Robin Hood of Punjab" due to his reputation for robbing from the rich and giving to the poor, much like the legendary Robin Hood.

== Early life ==
Jagga, born as Jagat Singh in 1901 or 1902, came from a Virk Jat family in Dasuwal, Punjab, then part of British India. Before Jagga was born, his parents, Sardar Makhan Singh Virk and Bhagan, had six children, but none of them survived. Seeking help, Makhan went to a sant named Inder Singh in the nearby village of Sodhi Wala. Inder instructed him to purchase a male goat before the birth of the next child and to ensure that the newborn touched it. The saint also warned him not to give the baby a name starting with the letter "J". It is said that when Makhan followed Inder's advice, the newborn survived, and the buck died shortly after being touched by the child. However, despite this development, an uncle of the child insisted on naming him Jagat, ignoring the saint's warning.

Jagga's father died when he was still a young child, so he was raised by his mother, Bhagan, and uncle, Roop Singh Sidhu. Jagga developed a strong passion for wrestling and often practiced at the village akhara with his friend Sohan Teli. Jagga later married Inder Kaur from the nearby village of Talwandi, and the couple had a daughter named Gulab Kaur. Jagga owned 10 Murabbas (~250 acres) of land, so his uncle and mother did not expect him to do much physical labor.

== Appearance and personality ==
Jagga Jatt was known for his strong physique, medium height, wheatish complexion, distinctive double-ringed mustache, and fiercely independent personality.

On one occasion, Jagga physically overpowered the proud Nakai brothers who lived in the village of his in-laws. In another incident, he had a heated argument with a patwari who refused to provide information about his land, leading to him scattering the official record books in protest, scaring the officer into complying. These bold acts, combined with his strength and fearless nature, made Jagga a well-known and admired figure in the surrounding villages.

== Becoming an outlaw ==
Jagga's growing popularity in the region drew the envy of the Zaildar of Kal Mokal village. Feeling his authority being challenged by Jagga's influence, the Zaildar had him falsely accused and imprisoned for four years. After Jagga's release and return home, a theft occurred in the nearby village of Bhai Pheru. Seizing the opportunity to target him again, the Zaildar, along with his ally Inspector Asgar Ali, falsely linked Jagga to the incident. The inspector summoned him to the station for questioning. Hearing this, Jagga went into hiding and was soon declared an outlaw.

Enraged by the continued harassment from the police, Jagga took matters into his own hands. At the village of Kanganpur, he snatched a rifle from a policeman and killed him. From that moment on, he was branded a bandit. However, Jagga didn’t turn to crime for personal gain—he targeted only the wealthy, using the stolen goods to help the poor and needy.

His first act of banditry took place in the village of Ghumiari, located on the border of Kasur and Lahore districts. Along with his companions Jhanda Singh Nirmal Ke and Thakur Singh Mandeyali, he raided the home of a goldsmith. They took the gold and burned the account books that recorded the debts of poor villagers.

Jagga later formed a loyal band of outlaws. His core group included Banta Singh, his childhood friend Sohan Teli, Lalu Nai (who served as the group’s cook), Bholu and Bawa.

== Death ==
Ultimately, Jagga was betrayed by one of his fellow rebels, Lalu Nai, dying at the young age of 29.

While visiting the village of Sidhupur to pay his respects to the grieving blind mother of another infamous bandit, a Muslim named Mallangi, Jagga decided to spend the noon there. He asked Lalu Nai, the cook, to prepare a meal. Lalu, however, plotted against him and called his brothers from a nearby village, hoping to claim the reward for Jagga's death. Lalu suggested they share some wine before eating. Jagga and his companion Banta agreed, but Sohan Teli declined, saying he had to visit a friend in a nearby village. After Jagga and Banta became intoxicated and fell asleep beneath a banyan tree, Lalu and his brothers took advantage of the moment and shot them. Hearing the gunfire, Sohan returned, but when he saw the bloody scene and tried to confront Lalu, he too was shot and killed.

This event is commemorated in a Punjabi folk song:

ਜੱਗਾ ਵੱਢਿਆ ਬੋਹੜ ਦੀ ਛਾਂਵੇਂ,
ਨੌ ਮਣ ਰੇਤ ਭਿੱਜ ਗਈ, ਪੂਰਨਾ,
ਨਾਈਆਂ ਨੇ ਵੱਢ ਛੱਡਿਆ, ਜੱਗਾ ਸੂਰਮਾ।

Transliteration
Jagga waddhia boharh di chhaven,
Nau man ret bhijj gai poorna,
Naeeaan ne waddh chhaddia jagga soorma.

Translation
Jagga was slain under the shade of the banyan tree,
Nine maunds of sand soaked with blood, Poorna,
The Nais cut down the brave Jagga.

== Family ==
Jagga had only one daughter named Gulab Kaur, affectionately nicknamed Gabbo. After her marriage, her in-laws renamed her Resham Kaur. Jagga had arranged her marriage to Avtar Singh, the nephew of his fellow dacoit and close friend Kehar Singh. Avtar died in 2005 in Banwala Anu village, located in the Malout tehsil of Sri Muktsar Sahib district. Jagga's daughter continues to reside there. Her interviews have been featured in several newspapers over the years. Jagga's wife, Inder Kaur, also died in Banwala Anu in 1983. His great-grandnephew, Durga Singh Arifke, was a notable militant associated with Avtar Singh Brahma's Tat Khalsa and the Khalistan Liberation Force during the Punjab Insurgency.

== In popular media ==
Jagga remains a prominent heroic figure celebrated in Punjabi and Bollywood media. His story has inspired a few Punjabi movies, such as Jagga starring Dara Singh.

== See also ==
- Robin Hood
- Dulla Bhatti
- Malangi
- Paan Singh Tomar
- Phoolan Devi
- Seema Parihar
- Veerappan
