= Phir Milenge (1942 film) =

- Directed by: Sohrab Modi
- Produced by: Sohrab Modi
- Starring: Sardar Akhtar; Sadiq Ali; K. N. Singh; Meena Shorey
- Cinematography: Y. D. Sarpotdar
- Music by: Mir Saheb; Pandit Sudarshan (lyrics)
- Production company: Minerva Movietone
- Release date: 1942
- Running time: 147 minutes
- Country: India
- Language: Hindi

Phir Milenge (We Will Meet Again) is a 1942 Indian Hindi and Urdu-language social drama film produced and directed by Sohrab Modi. Made under the banner of Minerva Movietone, it had music by Mir Saheb while the lyricist was Pandit Sudarshan. Modi had discovered Meena when she came to watch his film shooting. He cast her in a character role for her debut in Sikandar (1941). This was her second film for Modi where she played a supporting role. She was later to marry producer, director Roop K. Shorey and go on to become popular as Meena Shorey.

The film starred Sardar Akhtar, Sadiq Ali, K. N. Singh, Meena (Meena Shorey), Eruch Tarapore and Saadat Ali.

== Cast ==
- Sardar Akhtar
- Sadiq Ali
- Meena Shorey
- K. N. Singh
- Eruch Tarapore
- Abu Bakar
- Ghulam Hussain
- Saadat Ali
- G. S. Shore

== Soundtrack ==
The music was composed by Mir Sahib with lyrics by Pandit Sudarshan. The singers were Sardar Akhtar, Menka, Meena Shorey, Abu Bakar, Sadiq Ali, G. S. Shore and E. Tarapore.

=== Song list ===
#	Title	Singer
1	"Aa Man Tujhko Samjhayein"	Sardar Akhtar
2	"Aaj Jawani Aaj Jawani, Aaj Sajan Tu Madhmata"	Menka
3	"Tune Chhede Mere Dil Ke Taar"	Meena (Shorey)
4	"Pagle Kaahe hot Adheer"	Menka
5	"Sipahi Tune Jeet Liya Maidan"	Sardar Akhtar
6	"Biyaah Bin Man Ki Khushi Nahin Payi"	Abu Bakar, Sadiq Ali, G. S. Shore, E. Tarapore
7	"Kisise Preet Na Kariyo Koi"	Sardar Akhtar
8	"Jag Chalti Phirti Maya"	Chorus
9	"Aao Shaadi Ki Khushyian Manayein Dear"	Menka
