= Sacred Heart Convent School, Lahore =

Pakistani school

Sacred Heart Convent School
- Agha Shorish Kashmiri (Thornton) Road, Lahore; Pakistan

Information
- Type: Private primary and secondary school
- Religious affiliation: Catholicism
- Denomination: Institute of The Sisters of Charity of Jesus and Mary
- Established: 3 June 1908; 117 years ago
- Founders: Sisters of Charity of Jesus and Mary; Sister Marie de la Trinite Lootens
- Age: 3 to 16
- Website: www.shsscjm.com

Sacred Heart Convent School, or SHCS, is a private Catholic primary and secondary school for girls located in Lahore, Pakistan. It was established in 1908.

== History ==
At the end of the 19th century, the Great Famine plagued the subcontinent. In 1897, the Roman Catholic hierarchy decided to send a group of nuns to care for the children who had been traumatised, abandoned and orphaned by the Famine.

By 1906, the Great Famine ended and the number of children decreased, so the dorm rooms that once comprised the orphanage were left empty. At that time, financial support from abroad was withdrawn and making ends meet became difficult. The unoccupied rooms were transformed into Sacred Heart School. A notice was placed in the newspapers by Sister Marie de la Trinite Lootens to announce the opening of an all girls' school for both boarders and day scholars from affluent families.

The school teaches Hindus, Muslims, Parsis, and Christians.

== Principals ==
- Sister Martin de Porres(1953-2022)
- Sister Geneveive (2023-present)

== Notable alumni ==
- Aruna Asaf Ali, freedom fighter
- Nirlep Kaur, politician
- Syed Babar Ali, founder of Packages Limited
- Shyama Zutshi,film actress

== See also ==
- Sacred Heart Cathedral, Lahore
