= Mangti =

- Directed by: Roop K. Shorey
- Written by: R.L. Shorey, (dialouges)Nand Lal Noorpuri, Aziz Kashmiri
- Story by: R.L Shory
- Produced by: Shorey Pictures, R.L. Shorey
- Starring: Masood Pervez; Mumtaz Shanti; Majnu; Manorma; Gul Zaman; Amin Malik
- Cinematography: Harcharn Singh Kwatra
- Music by: Pandit Govindram
- Production company: Kamla Movietone
- Release date: 1942 (British India)
- Country: India
- Language: Punjabi

Mangti is a 1942 Indian Punjabi-language film starring Masood Pervez in the titular role with Mumtaz Shanti and others. It ran for more than one year in Lahore and became the first Golden Jubilee Punjabi film in British India.

== Music ==
The music is composed by Pandit Govindram. The playback singers include Zeenat Begum, Rehmat Bai and Noor Jehan. Nand Lal Noorpuri wrote the lyrics along with Nazim Panipati.

== Cast ==
- Mumtaz Shanti
- Masood Parvez
- Manju
- Manorma
- Gul Zaman
- Ghulam Qadir
- Kamla
- Amin Malik
- Raj Rani
- Hukam Singh
- Mehmood Khan
- Satish Batra
- P. Kapoor
- Jan Ganja
- Zubeida Begum
- Dr. Ghouri
- Baig

== Film songs ==
- Aavin Chann Ve Nehar De Kandhe Utte – sung by Zeenat Begum
- Aey Dunia Taan Khush Hundi Eiy – sung by Zeenat Begum
- Mainu Suttian Neend Na Aayee – sung by Zeenat Begum
- Banke Naina Walia Nain Milanda Ja – sung by Zeenat Begum and Rehmat Bai
- Lutt Lai Mast Jawani
- Aithaun Udd Ja Bholia Panchhia – a duet by Nandlal Noorpuri and Zeenat Begum
- Supne Vich Mahi Aaya, Haule-Haule- Sung by Zeenat Begum
- Tere Dars Di Pyasi
- Din Charhia Tey Bankian Naaran – sung by Zeenat Begum and Rehmat Bai
