= Prithviraj Samyogita =

- Directed by: Najam Naqvi
- Produced by: Shalimar Pictures
- Starring: Prithviraj Kapoor; Meena Shorey
- Music by: S.K Pal
- Release date: 1946
- Country: India
- Language: Hindi

Prithviraj Samyogita is a Bollywood film. It was released in 1946.

== Cast ==
- Prithviraj Kapoor
- Meena Shorey
- Bharat Vyas
- Tewari
- Sheyama
