= Government of Punjab =

Government of Punjab may refer to:

- Government of Punjab, India
- Government of Punjab, Pakistan
