= Panchhi =

- Directed by: Barkat Mehra
- Written by: Ehsan B.A.
- Starring: Zahur Raja; Manorama; Hari Shivdasani; Radha Viswanathan
- Cinematography: A. Hameed
- Music by: Amarnath
- Distributed by: Nigar Productions
- Release date: 1944
- Country: India
- Language: Hindi

Panchhi is a Bollywood film. It was released in 1944.

== Cast ==
- Zahur Raja
- Hari Shivdasani
- Manorama
- Radha Viswanathan
- Saleem Raza
- Ghulam Qadir
