= Dhadkan (1946 film) =

1946 film

- Directed by: Zahur Raja
- Starring: Zahur Raja
- Music by: G. M. Durrani
- Distributed by: Raj Movietone
- Release date: 1946
- Country: India
- Language: Hindi

Dhadkan is a Bollywood film. It was released in 1946.

== Cast ==
- Zahur Raja
- Jyoti
- Murad
- Misra
- Chandrika
