= Malangi (bandit) =

Folk hero from British India

Malangi (1890s – 1927) was a dacoit or a bandit during the colonial occupation of Punjab, British India. He was known as 'Robinhood' in his native district of Kasur. Punjab has a folklore tradition of appreciating the role of dacoits such as Malangi who defied the authorities of the period and sided with the common people. Other such well-known Punjabi rebels were Nizam Lohar, Imam Din Gohavia and Jagga Jatt, who were considered folk heroes by people during the early part of the 20th century. Folk songs of bravery of these dacoits are sung even today. One song sung in Punjab that reflects the prominence of Malangi goes like this:

Din nu raj Firangi da
Raati raj Malangi da

(Whereas the British rule in the day
It is Malangi who governs the night)

== Early life and legacy ==
Malangi lived in a village known as Lakho in the district of Kasur in present-day Punjab, Pakistan. His father died when he was just six months old. The land which his father left for Malangi was captured by the feudal lords who dominated the area. Malangi's mother was helpless after the death of her husband, and she married a Sikh despite being a Muslim herself. When Malangi realized that his land had been appropriated by the landlords of his village, he fought to reclaim it. The landlords, who were British-appointed Lambardar (village leader) managed to isolate Malangi in the local community, and as he reacted in anger, he became a dacoit.

Even in recent times, some common criminals and bandits are known to add 'Malangi' as a nickname to their real birth names to enhance their image in the community.
