= Vinod (composer) =

Film music composer (1922-1959)

- Born: Eric Roberts; 28 May 1922; Lahore, Pakistan, British India
- Died: 25 December 1959 (aged 37); Mumbai, Maharashtra, India
- Years active: 1946–1962 (3 films with his music were released after his death in 1959)
- Spouse: Sheela Betty
- Children: Veena Solomon; Veera Mistry

Vinod (28 May 1922 – 25 December 1959) was a famous Indian film music director of the 1950s.

In 1949, he composed a hit Punjabi film song Lara Lappa Lara Lappa Lai Rakhda sung by Mohammed Rafi and Lata Mangeshkar, in the film Ek Thi Ladki (1949).

The real name of Vinod was Eric Roberts; Vinod was a professional name given by the Bombay Film Industry.

== Early life ==
Vinod was born Eric Roberts in Lahore on 28 May 1922. When Vinod was a child, he was fascinated by music played at Punjabi Hindu weddings. Vinod was a student of Pandit Amar Nath, a musical director from Lahore. At the age of 17 years, his first official record composition was released, Samne aayaga koi jalwa dikhayega koi.

== Career ==
Vinod started composing songs for films in 1946. He composed eleven songs, written by Aziz Kashmiri, for the film Khamosh Nigahen. Veteran music director Master Ghulam Haider who had introduced Lata Mangeshkar as a film playback singer to the Indian Film Industry recommended Lata to Vinod. So Vinod had Lata sing some Punjabi film songs in his Punjabi film Chaman (1948). Then he composed music for the 1949 film Ek Thi Ladki, which, along with the song Larra Lappa Larra Lappa Layi Rakhda, Addi Tappa Addi Tappa Layi Rakhda became a hit song, sung by Lata Mangeshkar and Mohammad Rafi. He moved to Bombay when Roop Kumar Shorey, a producer for whom Vinod had previously composed songs, brought his team there. Vinod composed music for thirty-six films, viz. thirty in Hindi and six in Punjabi language. He also composed four non-film songs. It was typical for Vinod, as a music composer, to insert Hindi songs in Punjabi films and Punjabi song lyrics in Hindi film songs.

== Personal life ==
Vinod with his family

Vinod married Sheela Betty in Lahore and then moved to Delhi. He composed Punjabi film music like Saari Raat Tera Tak Ni Aa Rah and Wey Tarian Taun Puchh Chann Wey. He had two daughters, Veena Solomon and Veera Mistry; both died in September 2016 and 2017, respectively. Veena was married to Newton Solomon and Veera was married to Kelly Mistry. Survivors are Vinod's grandchildren Sarah, Rakesh, Jacqueline, Eric (who is named after Vinodji) and Carl and great-grandchildren Rhea, Mithila, Shaun and Rania.

== Death ==
Vinod died from tetanus on 25 December 1959, at the age of 37, after having cut himself shaving while using a rusted razor blade. By the time he was admitted to a hospital, the illness was beyond treatment and he lapsed into a coma.

== Filmography ==
- 01 Khamosh Nigahen (1946)
- 02 Paraye Bas Mein (1946) (with Niaz Husain)
- 03 Kamini (film) (1946)
- 04 Chaman (1948) (Punjabi)
- 05 Ek Thi Ladki (1949)
- 06 Taara (film) (1949)
- 07 Anmol Ratan (1950)
- 08 Bhaiya Ji (1950) (Punjabi)
- 09 Waffa (1950) (with Bulo C Rani)
- 10 Mutiar (1950) (Punjabi)
- 11 Bulbul (1951 film) (1951)
- 12 For Ladies Only (film) (1951) (Titli)
- 13 Mukhra (1951)
- 14 Sabz Bagh (1951) (with Gulshan Sufi)
- 15 Saloni (film) (1951)
- 16 Amar Shaheed (1952) (with Vasant Desai)
- 17 Aag Ka Dariya (1953)
- 18 Ek Do Teen (1953)
- 19 Ashtalli (1954) (Punjabi)
- 20 Laadla (1954)
- 21 Ramman (film) (1954)
- 22 Haa Haa Hii Hii Hoo Hoo (1954)
- 23 Jalwa (1955)
- 24 Ootpatang (1955)
- 25 Shri Naqad Narain (1955)
- 26 Makhi Choos (1956)
- 27 Miss 56 (1956 in Pakistan with Pakistani composer G.A. Chishti (Baba Chishti) and in Miss 58 in India in 1958)
- 28 Sheikh Chilli (1956)
- 29 Garma Garam (1957)
- 30 Mumtaz Mahal (film) (1957)
- 31 Nikki (1958) (Punjabi)
- 32 Miss Hunterwali (1959)
- 33 Dekhi Teri Bumbai (1961)
- 34 Ek Ladki Saat Ladke (1961) with S. Mohinder
- 35 Rang Raliyan (1962) (with Lachhi Ram and Mukherjee)

Note: Vinod's last three films were released after his death.
