= Ek Thi Larki =

1949 film

Ek Thi Ladki
- Directed by: Roop K. Shorey
- Written by: I. S. Johar
- Produced by: Roop K. Shorey
- Starring: Meena Shorey; Motilal; Kuldip Kaur; Agha
- Cinematography: Anwar Pabani
- Edited by: Pran Mehra
- Music by: Vinod
- Production company: Shorey Films
- Release date: 1949
- Running time: 164 minutes
- Country: India
- Language: Hindi

Ek Thi Ladki

Ek Thi Ladki (Hindi: एक थी लड़की, There Was A Girl) is a 1949 Hindi action comedy film by director Roop K. Shorey.

It had the famous Punjabi song "Laara Lappa Laara Lappa Layi Rakhda" by Lata Mangeshkar, Satish Batra and Mohammad Rafi. The music director was Vinod, with lyrics by Aziz Kashmiri and story by I. S. Johar.

The film starred Meena Shorey (as Meena) who became famously known as the "Larra Lappa" girl following the release of the film, and Motilal (as Ranjeet).

== Plot ==
The movie is based on Meena (Meena Shorey) who is running away from two men, who are blackmailing her for a crime she did not commit. Along the way, she meets Ranjeet (Motilal), who is engaged to be married to the daughter of his boss but falls in love with Meena.

== Cast ==
- Meena as Meena
- Motilal as Ranjeet
- Kuldip Kaur
- Majnu as Mohan
- Johar as Sohan
- Shakuntala
- Satish Batra
- Sham Lal as Seth Shyam Sunder
- Moti Bina
- Agha Miraj

== Music ==
All Film songs lyrics by Aziz Kashmiri and music by Vinod (composer):

- Lara Lappa Laayi Rakhda - Lata Mangeshkar
- Yeh Shokh Sitare Ik Shokh Nazar Ki Tarah - Lata Mangeshkar, Mohammed Rafi
- Lara Lappa Lara Lappa Laai Rakhda - Lata Mangeshkar, Mohammed Rafi, Satish Batra
- Dilli Se Aaya Bhai Tingu - Vinita Amladi (née Binota Chakraborty)
- Ghat Kari Matwari Ghir Aai Rasiya Re - Zeenat Begum
- Ghir Ghir Ke Aai Hai Badariya - Lata Mangeshkar
- Hum Chale Door Dil Hua Chhur - Lata Mangeshkar, Mohammed Rafi
- Ab Haal-e-Dil Ya Haal-e-Jigar Kuchh Na Puchiye - Lata Mangeshkar, Mohammed Rafi
- Chandni Raat Hai Gulshan Mein Bahar Hai - Geeta Dutt
- Lambi Joru Badi Museebat, Arey Din Dekhe Na Raat - Lata Mangeshkar, Mohammed Rafi
