= Shalimar (1946 film) =

- Directed by: Roop K. Shorey
- Written by: I. S. Johar
- Produced by: Shorey Pictures
- Starring: Chandra Mohan; Begum Para; Manorama
- Narrated by: I. S. Johar
- Music by: Amarnadh & Anupam Ghatak
- Release date: 1946
- Country: India
- Language: Hindi

Shalimar is a Bollywood film directed by Roop K. Shorey. It was released in 1946. The cast included Chandra Mohan, Begum Para, Manorama, Nisar, Parmila and Manju.

== Cast ==
=== Male ===
- A. L. Nasir (Murad)
- Harsha (Asif Khan)
- Chandra Mohan (Jehangir)

=== Female ===
- Manorama (Taji)
- Pramela (Shali)
- Begum Para (Nurjehan)
