= Sanjit Narwekar =

Indian documentary filmmaker and author

Sanjit Narwekar (born 8 May 1952) is an Indian documentary filmmaker scriptwriter and author. A 1967 alumni of Bombay Scottish High School, Mumbai, he completed his Bachelor's in Statistics (1974) and his Master's in Economics (1976) from the University of Mumbai.

== Early career ==
He began writing in 1969 while he was still in college. During his post graduation he worked at the National Institute of Bank Management but opted to work in journalism soon after he had completed his master's degree. He worked in a wide variety of newspaper organizations and has been News Editor of Screen (1980–1991), Editor of TV & Video World (1994–95) and Executive Editor of Documentary Today (2007–2012).

== Career ==
Narwekar has authored/edited 20 books on film history and published more than 100 books for various organizations. He has also hosted interviews/magazine programs for All India Radio and Doordarshan. He has participated in several national and international seminars and conducted workshops on various aspects of Indian cinema, both in India and abroad. He has also served on several selection committees and juries and has been a member of the Film Advisory Board of the Government of India (1992–93).

He worked briefly as scriptwriter before turning to documentary films. He is based in Mumbai, India and heads his cinema research company Cinemaink.

== Awards ==
In 1996 he was awarded the Swarna Kamal (National Award) for the Best Book on Cinema for Marathi Cinema in Retrospect. The Delhi-based newspaper The Pioneer nominated it among the top five books on Indian cinema in post-independent India (1947–1997).

In 2017 he was made Sanmanniya Sabhasad (Distinguished Fellow) of the Mumbai Marathi Patrakar Sangh.

In 2020 he was conferred the Bimal Roy Memorial Award "for documenting Indian Cinema's History with knowledge and scholarship".

In 2022 he was chairman, National Jury, Mumbai International Film Festival for Documentary, Short and Animation Films 2022. Interaction with National Jury

In 2022 he was conferred the Dr V Shantaram Lifetime Achievement Award at the Mumbai International Film Festival for Documentary, Short and Animation Films 2022.Award presentation

== Films: Documentaries ==
- Nations in Turmoil (Writer-Director) (2011)
- The Pioneering Spirit: V.Shantaram on YouTube (Writer-Producer-Director) (2010)
- Dreaming Movies (Writer-Director) (2007)
- Protecting Creativity (Writer-Director) (2005)
- Remembering Devendra Goel (Creative Consultant) (2005)
- Lavni Rupdarshan (Director) (2004)
- Life On The Edge (Writer-Director) (2002)
- Yes! I Am A Communist (Writer/Co-director: Vinay Newalkar) (2002)
- India Unveiled (Writer-Director) (1998)
- Lavni (Executive Producer-Writer) (1998)

== Films: Short Fiction ==
- Mahilaone Thama Tha Akash (miniseries)(Executive Producer) (2002)
- Yeh Kal Kab Aayega (Writer-Director) (2001)

== Film Scripts ==
- Durghatna (Hindi) (1994/unproduced)
- Ghar Sansar (Marathi) (1993)
- Khulyancha Bazaar (Marathi) (1992)
- Premankur (Marathi) (1992)
- Anapekshit (Marathi) (1990)
- Saboot (Hindi telefilm) (1989)
- Samarpan (Hindi telefilm) (1988)

== Books: Biography ==
- Ambalal Patel: A Visionary (2026)
- K.A.Abbas: The Celluloid Revolutionary (2009/unpublished)
- Bimal Roy: The Silent Thunder (2008/unpublished)
- Dilip Kumar: The Last Emperor (2003) ISBN 81-291-0886-0
- V.Shantaram: The Legacy of the Royal Lotus (2003) ISBN 81-291-0218-8
- Mother Shamala: A Gift Of Motherhood (1998)
- J.G.Bodhe: The Uncommon Common Man (1986)

== Books: Film History ==
- Nitrate Dreams: The Silent Film in India (work in progress)
- Documenting India: The Legacy of the Films Division (unpublished)
- Legends of Indian Cinema: Dadasaheb Phalke Awardees 1969-1991 (edited)(2025) ISBN 978-93-6392-274-7
- Eena Meena Deeka: The Story of Hindi Film Comedy (2005) ISBN 81-291-0859-3
- The Watchdogs of Democracy: The Story of Investigative Journalism (2005)
- Flashback: A Panorama of Indian Documentaries 1981-2001 (2001)
- Crafting Movies: Exploring Hindi Mainstream Cinema (2000)
- Directory of Indian Documentary (1998)
- The Arrival of Cinema in India (1996)
- Marathi Cinema: In Retrospect (1995)
- A Directory of Indian Filmmakers & Films (1994) ISBN 978-0313292842
- Films Division & The Indian Documentary (1992)
- Genres of Indian Cinema (Co-Editor: B. K. Karanjia) (1988)
