= Abdul Aziz Kashmiri =

Abdul Aziz Kashmiri (10 June 1919 – 27 April 2010) was an Indian Kashmiri journalist.

Kashmiri was born in Srinigar, Kashmir on 10 June 1919. After working as a secular journalist he founded the Urdu-language weekly, Roshni, in Srinagar, Kashmir in 1943, which became a daily newspaper in 1977. He travelled with Khwaja Nazir Ahmad of Lahore in Kashmir collecting evidence in support of his publications.

Kashmiri was also the author of Hazrat Isa aur Isayyat (حضرت عیسی اور عیسائیت 1954), translated into English as Christ in Kashmir (English 1968).

Kashmiri died on 27 April 2010, at the age of 90.
