= Mubarak Begum =

Indian singer (1936–2016)

Background information
- Born: 5 January 1936; Sujangarh, Churu district, Rajasthan, India
- Died: 18 July 2016 (aged 80) Jogeshwari, Mumbai, Maharashtra, India
- Genre: Playback singing
- Occupation: Singer
- Instrument: Vocalist
- Years active: 1949 – 1981

Mubarak Begum (5 January 1936 – 18 July 2016) was an Indian vocalist who sang in the Hindi and Urdu languages. She was a playback singer in Bollywood films during the 1950s and 1960s. She had also recorded and given public performances in a number of other genres, including Ghazal and Na`at.

== Career ==
Mubarak Begum started her career with light music recitals performed for All India Radio, India's national public radio station. Her career as a playback singer began in 1949, with the Indian Hindi-language film Aiye. It was the Indo-Pakistani composer Nashad (not to be confused with Indian composer Naushad) who gave Begum her first break. The first song she recorded for films was "Mohe Aane Lagi Angrayi, Aaja Aaja" (Aiye (1949). She also sang a duet with the then-upcoming Lata Mangeshkar in the same film. A well-recognized song in her career was "Kabhi Tanhaiyon Mein Yun", composed by Snehal Bhatkar for Kidar Sharma's film Hamari Yaad Aayegi (1961).

=== Popular songs ===
Mubarak Begum sang a total of 178 songs for Hindi films during her career, and the total number of films where her songs have appeared is 115. For a complete list of her songs, see List of songs recorded by Mubarak Begum. The following is a short list of her most popular songs:

- "Mujh ko Apne Gale Lagalo, Aye Mere Hamrahi", with lyrics by Hasrat Jaipuri, and music by Shankar Jaikishan (from Hamrahi, 1963)
- "Kabhi Tanhaayon Mein Yun, Hamari Yaad Aayegi", with lyrics by Kidar Sharma, and music by Snehal Bhatkar (from Hamari Yaad Aayegi, 1961)
- "Neend Ud Jaaye Teri, Chain se Sone Wale" (from Juaari, 1968)
- "Woh na aayenge palat kar", with lyrics by Sahir Ludhianvi, and music by S. D. Burman (from Devdas, 1955)
- "Hum haal-e-dil sunayenghe, sunyay ke na sunyay", with lyrics by Shailendra, and music by Salil Chowdhury (from Madhumati, 1958)
- "Wada humse kiya, dil kisi ko diya" (from Saraswatichandra, 1968)
- "Be-murawwat bewafa begana-e dil aap hain", with lyrics by Jan Nisar Akhtar, and music by C. Arjun (from Susheela, 1966)
- "Ae dil bataa hum kahan aa gaye" (from Khooni Khazana, 1965)
- "Kuchh Ajnabi se aap hain" (from Shagun, 1964)
- "Ayji ayji yaad rakhna sanam" (from Daku Mansoor, 1961)
- "Shama Gul Karke Na Jao Yun" (from Arab Ka Sitara, 1961)
- "Sanwariya teri yaad mein ro ro marenge hum" (from Ramu Toh Deewana Hai, 1980)
- "Humein Dum Daike, Sautan Ghar Jana" a duet with Asha Bhosle, with lyrics by Qamar Jalalabadi, and music by Iqbal Qureshi (from Yeh Dil Kisko Doon, 1963)
- "Yeh moonh aur masoor ki daal", with Sharda (from Around the World (1967)

== Personal life ==
Mubarak Begum was born into a Muslim family at [Jhunjhunu] a district town in Rajasthan. She was married to Mr. Shaikh, a man from her own community, and she was the mother of two children, a son and a daughter. Her husband and daughter are both no longer living; in her later years, she lived with her son, daughter-in-law and granddaughter.

Although she was a well-known singer, Begum was not able to capitalize on her talents. She did not have the savvy "networking" skills that are so important in careers connected to the entertainment industry, and her career remained stilted as a result. While a competent singer, she was not as skilled in business matters. She was more interested in the music than the money, and her day-to-day expenses and generosity did not allow her to save much money. In a 2016 interview, given before she died, when asked, she said that the Pakistani ghazal singer Ghulam Ali was her favorite singer.

Begum's daughter, who had been suffering from Parkinson's disease, died in October 2015, after which Begum's own health took a serious downturn. In May 2016, the press reported that Begum was in hospital and that her family were unable to pay her medical bills. She lived in a one-bedroom apartment in Behram Bagh, in the Mumbai suburb of Jogeshwari, with her family, consisting of a son, daughter-in-law, and granddaughter. Her sole income was a pension which she received from her late husband's employer. This pension was reported by Indian news channel NDTV to be Rs. 800 ($12) per month and by Indian newspaper DNA to be Rs. 3000/- ($45) per month; both figures are extremely paltry by Indian standards, and utterly inadequate for a person's sustenance. Begum was dependent on her son, Hussain Shaikh, who earned an uncertain income by freelancing as a chauffeur, and Begum was cared for by her daughter-in-law.

Begum's daughter-in-law, Zarina Hussain Shaikh, told the press that the actor Salman Khan was virtually the only person from the Hindi film industry who was helping the family financially, on a sustained, long-term basis. He had been paying the full costs of all medicine required by the elderly Begum. The singer Lata Mangeshkar consoled Begum after the death of her daughter and grieved with her. In June 2016, Vinod Tawde, a BJP minister in the government of Maharashtra, stepped in to help the family. Tawde found that there were no government schemes under which he could release money to Begum's family, therefore he asked a charitable trust run by people close to him to help, and they provided Begum with some money.

== Filmography ==
- Aiye (1949) (her debut film, music by Shaukat Ali Nashad)
- Basera (1950)
- Dolti Naiya (1950)
- Phoolon Ka Haar (1951) (music by Hansraj Behl)
- Mamta (1952)
- Mordhawj (1952)
- Sheesha (1952)
- Char Chand (1953)
- Daera (1953)
- Dharma Patni (1953)
- Africa (1954)
- Aamir (1954)
- Aulad (1954)
- Chandni Chowk (1954)
- Dak Babu (1954)
- Gawaiya (1954)
- Gul Bahar (1954)
- Har Jeet (1954)
- Maan (1954)
- Rishta (1954)
- Shabaab (1954) (music by Naushad)
- Sangam (1954)
- Tatar Ke Chor (1954)
- Baradari (1955)
- Devdas (1955) (music by S.D. Burman)
- Jasoos (1955)
- Patit Pawan (1955)
- Khandan (1955)
- Kundan (1955)
- Rukhsana (1955)
- Sau Ka Note (1955)
- Sakhi Lutera (1955)
- Aan Baan (1956)
- Awara Shahzadi (1956)
- Badal Aur Bijli (1956)
- Baghdad Ka Jadoo (1956)
- Baghi Saudagar (1956)
- Dhola Maru (1956)
- Fighting Queen (1956)
- Harihar Bhakti (1956)
- Jungle Queen (1956)
- Lal-E-Yaman (1956)
- Rangeen Raatein (1956)
- Sultana Daku (1956)
- Fashion (1957)
- Gateway of India (1957)
- Maharani (1957)
- Paisa (1957)
- Parvin (1957)
- Patal Pari (1957)
- Chetak Rana Pratap (1958)
- Jungle Princess (1958)
- Madhumati (1958) (music by Salil Chowdhury)
- Sim Sim Marjina (1958)
- Behram Daku (1959)
- Chini Jadugar (1959)
- Maa Ke Ansoo (1959)
- Jalim Jadugar (1960)
- Mughl-e-Azam (1960)
- Return of Mr. Superman (1960)
- Veer Durghadas (1960)
- Arab Ka Sitara (1961)
- Daku Mansoor (1961)
- Dekhi Teri Bombay (1961)
- Gypsy Girl (1961)
- Hamari Yaad Aayegi (1961) (her most popular film song, music by Snehal Bhatkar)
- Piya Milan Ki Aas (1961)
- Shahi Farman (1961)
- Zindagi Aur Khwab (1961)
- Cobra Girl (1963)
- Hamrahi (1963) (music by Shankar-Jaikishan)
- Sunehre Nagin (1963)
- Yeh Dil Kisko Doon (1963)
- Aandhi Aur Toofan (1964)
- Balma Bada Nadan (1964)
- Fariyad (1964)
- Hameer Haath (1964)
- Kab Ho Hain Gawana Hamaar (1964)
- Magic Carpet (1964)
- Marvel Man (1964)
- Naihar Chutal Jai (1964)
- Pahadi Nagin (1964)
- Punar Milan (1964)
- Qawwali Ki Raat (1964)
- Shagoon (1964)
- Tarzan and Captain Kishore (1964)
- Arzoo (1965)
- Black Arrow (1965)
- Khooni Khazana (1965)
- Main Hoon Jadugar (1965)
- Mohabbat Isko Kehte Hain (1965)
- More Man Mitwa (1965)
- Kaajal (1965)
- Tarzan and the King Kong (1965)
- Gagola (1966)
- Neend Humari Khwab Tumhare (1966) (music by Madan Mohan)
- Professor Aur Jadugar (1966)
- Sushila (1966)
- Teesri Kasam (1966)
- Zimbo Finds a Son (1966)
- Awara Ladki (1967)
- Around the World (1967)
- Mera Bhai Mera Dushman (1967)
- Poonam Ki Chand (1967)
- Juaari (1968) (music by Kalyanji-Anandji)
- Saraswatichandra (1968)
- Hum Ek Hain (1969)
- Chetna (1970)
- Chandan (1971)
- Annadata (1972)
- Ek Bechara (1972)
- Chattan Singh (1974)
- Subah Zaroor Ayegi (1977)
- Ramu Toh Deewana Hain (1980)
- Sister (1980)
- Ganga Mang Rahi Balidan (1981)
- Nai Imarat (1981)

== Death ==
Mubarak Begum died on 18 July 2016 in Mumbai, India at age 80.

== See also ==
- List of songs recorded by Mubarak Begum
