= Baradari =

Baradari or Bara Dari may refer to:

- Baradari (building), a historic 12-door building structure
- Baradari, a 12-opening Indian palanquin
- Baradari (brotherhood), a Persian word for brotherhood
- Nezahat Baradari (born 1965), German politician
- Bara Dari (1955 film), India

== See also ==
- Baradar (disambiguation)
