= Baradar =

Baradar may refer to:

- Dah Baradar, a village in Zirtang Rural District, Lorestan Province, Iran
- Haft Baradar, also known as Qater Yuran-e Sofla, a village in Ojarud-e Shomali Rural District, Ardabil Province, Iran
- Seh Baradar, also known as Seh Barar, a village in Lajran Rural District, Semnan Province, Iran
- Abdul Ghani Baradar, co-founder and political leader of the Afghan Taliban
- Vaijanath Biradar, Indian comedian and film actor

== See also ==
- Barabar, caves in Bihar, India
- Barada (disambiguation)
- Baradari (disambiguation)
