= Aparadhi =

Aparadhi (lit. 'sinner') may refer to:

- Aparadhi (1949 film), an Indian Hindi-language film directed by Yeshwant Pethkar
- Aparadhi (1955 film), an Indian Bengali-language film directed by Debaki Bose
- Aparadhi (1976 film), an Indian Kannada-language film directed by Y. R. Swamy
- Aparadhi (1977 film), an Indian Malayalam-language film directed by P. N. Sundaram
- Aparadhi (2009 film), an Indian Bengali-language film directed by Subhash Sen

== See also ==
- Apradhi (disambiguation)
- Aparadhini, 1968 Indian film
