= Apradhi =

Apradhi (lit. 'sinner') may refer to:

- Aparadhi (1949 film), a Bollywood film by Yeshwant Pethkar starring Madhubala
- Apradhi (1974 film), a Bollywood drama by Jugal Kishore starring Yogeeta Bali and Master Bhagwan
- Apradhi (1992 film), a Bollywood film by K. Ravi Shankar

== See also ==
- Aparadhi (disambiguation)
- Apradhi Kaun (disambiguation)
- Apradh (lit. 'sin'), 1972 Indian film
