= Salgira =

1969 film

- Directed by: Qamar Zaidi
- Written by: Shams Hanafi
- Produced by: Najma Hassan
- Starring: Waheed Murad; Shamim Ara; Tariq Aziz; Santosh Rissal; Nighat Sultana; Nirala; Rehana Siddiqui; Talish; Asif Ali Zardari
- Music by: Nashad
- Release date: 14 February 1969
- Running time: approx. 3 hours
- Country: Pakistan
- Language: Urdu

Salgira (Urdu: سالگرہ, lit. 'Anniversary') is an Urdu-language Pakistani black-and-white film released in 1969. It is a melodious love story directed by Qamar Zaidi, produced by Najma Hassan and written by Shams Hanafi. The film stars Waheed Murad and Shamim Ara in leading roles. The film's story is based on the lost and found formula. The plot revolves around a girl who gets lost in her childhood but when her parents find her, she gets accused of a murder.

The film marked the presence of Asif Ali Zardari, the eleventh and fourteenth President of Pakistan, as an actor. He appeared in the film in his childhood as the younger version of Murad's character.

== Plot ==
Salma splits accidentally from her parents in her childhood during a train journey. Jalal, a ruffian, takes her and hands over her to Rasheeda, a woman who is a singer and raises her. She names her Shabana, teaches her singing and on adolescence Shabana becomes a famous singer countrywide. She uses to sing on radio and public loves to listen her.

Anwar, a lwayer, also loves to listen Shabana and in this passion, he reaches to the radio station a day to see her. Afterwards, he usually meets her including a meeting in a poetry competition. They spend time together and fall in love with each other. One day after seeing her childhood doll in his house, Shabana realises that Anwar is the same child who takes her to his house when her parents had lost her. She shares it with him and he determines to search for her parents along with her help.

One day Ashar, prosecutor of Anwar's court, requests him to bring Shabana in his house at the occasion of his daughter's birthday who had lost years ago. Shabana goes there, and she attaches so much with them in the first meeting as they had lost their child and she had lost her parents.

Jalal, the ruffian who had abducted Shabana, returns to the country, and now wants to get money from her and for this purpose he sells her. He sends him cunningly to the house of Manzoor, who intends to buy her. On reaching there she learns about the whole situation, she fights him there and succeeds in escaping. Meanwhile, he gets killed by a knife accidentally in the fight. Manzoor's daughter reaches there and witnesses that Shabana was running from her house when her father was murdered.

Anwar tries to save her but couldn't succeed at all as all the evidences were against her. Ashar first orders to hang her, but later he discovers that she is her long-lost daughter, thus decides to save her. He gets retirement from his judgeship and helps Anwar in the case when the case is challenged in the High court. They win the case and Shabana gets save from the punishment and finally reunites with her long-lost parents.

== Cast ==
The film cast Waheed Murad (as Anwar), Shamim Ara (as Shabana/ Salma), Tariq Aziz (as Ashar), Santosh Rissal (as Mrs. Ashar), Nighat Sultana (as Rasheeda), Nirala, Rehana Siddiqui and Talish.

Asif Ali Zardari, President of Pakistan, acted as the young protagonist Waheed Murad. This is his only known film as a child actor.

== Release ==
Salgira was released on Valentine's Day in 1969. The film completed 20 weeks at the main cinemas and 61 weeks at the other cinemas of Karachi and thus became a golden jubilee film.

== Music ==
The music of Salgira is composed by Nashad and the lyrics are written by Shevan Rizvi and Tasleem Fazli. Playback singers are Noor Jehan, Mehdi Hassan, Irene Parveen and Ahmed Rushdi.

=== Track listing ===
- Lay aai phir kahan par qismat hamein kahan se... by Noor Jehan
- Meri zindgi hai naghma meri zindagi tarana... by Noor Jehan
- Zulf ko teri ghataon ka... by Mehdi Hassan
- Lazat-e-soz-e-jiger pooch le perwaney se... by Ahmed Rushdi & Irene Parveen
- Tere wadey se meri zindagi saji... by Ahmed Rushdi & Irene Parveen

== Awards ==
Salgira won 2 Nigar Awards in the following categories:

Category	Recipient
Best music	Nashad
Best female play back singer	Noor Jehan
