= Vikramaditya (film) =

1945 Indian film

- Directed by: Vijay Bhatt
- Produced by: "Vijay-Shankar" Bhatt
- Starring: Prithviraj Kapoor; Prem Adib; Baburao Pendharkar; Ratnamala
- Music by: Shankar Rao Vyas
- Production company: Prakash Pictures
- Release date: 1945
- Running time: 166 minutes
- Country: British India
- Language: Hindi

Vikramaditya is a 1945 Hindi historical drama film directed by Vijay Bhatt for his banner Prakash Pictures. The title role of the King of Avanti, Vikramaditya, was played by Prithviraj Kapoor, who had made a name for himself as a good actor by then and was extremely popular. The film was made as a result of Bhatt's interest in history and on the request of the Vikram Bimillenium Committee, celebrating the 2000 years of the King Vikramaditya according to the Vikram Samvat, Hindu calendar. The film-maker concentrated on factual history rather than fiction for his story. The music direction was by Shankar Rao Vyas with the lyricists being Ramesh Gupta and Roopdas. The film starred Prithviraj Kapoor, Prem Adib, Baburao Pendharkar, Ratnamala, Bhagwandas and Ranjana.

The story revolves around the king Vikramaditya, who promises to save the princess of Kashmir, appoints Kalidas as court-poet, and his fight against the Shakas (Scythians).

== Plot ==
The Shakas (Scythians) have invaded and defeated the Kashmir region. The Kashmiri princess Shreelakha, is on the run to avoid captivity and unwanted attention of Shakraj. The Shakas have already managed to capture several areas in India and the princess is finding it difficult to find refuge. She meets Kalidas the poet, who tells her to ask for shelter from King Vikramaditya, the ruler of Avanti. Kalidas, through his poetry impresses Madhvi, the daughter of Acharya Varamihir and she makes it possible for them to meet Vikramaditya. The King appoints Kalidas as the court poet. The princess asks for refuge and war against the Shakas. When Vikramaditya promises to do so he is met with opposition from his Minister, Vaital. Vaital on being rebuffed by the King then incites the people against the princess and tries to poison her. After several incidents involving the honesty of the King and his travails, the people think that Vaital has poisoned the King and the princess. The magnanimity and valour of the King is shown when he fights the Shakas, killing Shakaraj and releasing Shreelekha's father from captivity and restoring his kingdom.

== Cast ==
- Prithviraj Kapoor
- Ratnamala
- Baburao Pendharkar
- Prem Adib
- Ranjana
- Bhagwandas
- Jilloobai

== Soundtrack ==
Music Director was Shankar Rao Vyas and the lyricists were Ramesh Gupta and Roopdas. The singers were Rajkumari, Amirbai Karnataki, G. M. Durrani, Manna Dey.

=== Song list ===
#	Title	Singer	Lyricist
1	"Hai Gagan Mein"	Rajkumari, Manna Dey	Ramesh Gupta
2	"Om Jai Jai Shankar"	Amirbai Karnataki, G. M. Durrani, Manna Dey	Ramesh Gupta
3	"Ajab Hai Kudrat Ki Maya"	Manna Dey	Ramesh Gupta
4	"Ek Chakori Dev Pe Apne"	Manna Dey	Ramesh Gupta
5	"Shambho Mahadev Shankar"	G. M. Durrani	Ramesh Gupta
6	"Tej Phoonk Do Aaj"	Manna Dey	Roopdas
7	"Jai Jai Se Goonj Utha Bharat"	Amirbai Karnataki	Ramesh Gupta
8	"Om Jai Jai Shankar" (Male)	Manna Dey	Ramesh Gupta
9	"Neel Gagan Hai"	Manna Dey	Roopdas
