= Zindagi Ya Toofan (1958 film) =

1958 film

- Directed by: Nakhshab Jarchavi
- Written by: Khwaja Ahmad Abbas (story); Khwaja Ahmad Abbas & Akhtar ul Iman (dialogues)
- Produced by: Nakhshab Jarchavi
- Starring: Nutan; Pradeep Kumar; Johnny Walker; Minoo Mumtaz
- Cinematography: Dwarka Divecha
- Edited by: Prakash Aggarwal
- Music by: Nashad
- Release date: 1958
- Country: India
- Language: Urdu

Zindagi Ya Toofan is a 1958 Indian 'social drama' film in Urdu language produced, directed & song lyrics written by Nakhshab Jarchavi.

All music is composed by Nashad and the film song lyrics are by Nakhshab Jarchavi.

== Cast ==
- Nutan as Niloufer
- Pradeep Kumar as Akhtar
- Johnny Walker & Lotan as the 2 musicians-cum-servants-cum-general dogsbodies
- Minoo Mumtaz as Firoza
- Yakub as Sultan
- Om Prakash as Mirza
- Suresh as Akhtar's friend

=== Tracks ===
Song title	Sung by
Angdaai Bhi Woh Lenay Na Paaye Utha Kay Haath, Dekha Mujhe Aur Chorr Diye Muskra Kay Haath	Shamshad Begum & Asha Bhosle
Inayat Hai Nawazish Hai Agar Aisa Samajhte Hain	Shamshad Begum & Asha Bhosle
Mujhe Hai Zara Jazbe Dil Aazmana	Asha Bhosle & Talat Mahmood
Hamara Kya Hai Hum Tarpein, Magar Tuum Ko Qarar Aaye	Asha Bhosle & Talat Mahmood
Zulfon Ki Sunehri Chhaon Tale, Ek Aag Lagi, Do Deep Jale	Talat Mahmood
Dil Hai Bada Beimaan Bedarda	Asha Bhosle & Sudha Malhotra
Hum Apne Dil Kay Tukroun Ka Bana Kay Laayein Hain Sehra	Asha Bhosle
Aye Dil Walo Pyar Na Karna, Iss Paapi Sansar Se Darna	Asha Bhosle
Zindagi Hai Ya Koi Toofan Hai, Hum Tau Iss Jeenay Kay Haathon Mar Chalay (Female version)	Asha Bhosle
Zindagi Hai Ya Koi Toofan Hai, Hum Tau Iss Jeenay Kay Haathon Mar Chalay (Male version)	Khan Mastana
