= Zulfiqar Ali Bukhari =

Pakistani writer and broadcaster (1904–1975)

- ذوالفقار علی بخاری
- Bukhari at the BBC in 1941
- Born: 6 July 1904; Peshawar, North-West Frontier Province, British India (present-day Khyber Pakhtunkhwa, Pakistan)
- Died: 12 July 1975 (aged 71); Karachi, Sindh, Pakistan
- Education: Oriental College, Lahore
- Occupations: Radio Broadcasting also known as Baba-e-Nasharyaat (Father of Broadcasting in Pakistan)
- Website: Official website Archived

Zulfiqar Ali Bukhari, commonly known by his initials Z. A. Bukhari (Urdu: ذوالفقار علی بخاری, romanized: Zulfiqār 'Alī Buxārī) (6 July 1904 – 12 July 1975), was a broadcaster of British India and later of Pakistan. He was the first director-general of Radio Pakistan.

== Early life ==
He was born into a family of peers (Sufi mystics) on 6 July 1904 in Peshawar, British India. His family was of mixed Kashmiri and Hindkowan ethnicity. Zulfiqar Ali Bukhari, or Z. A. Bukhari as he was popularly known, came to Lahore after passing his matriculation exam. His elder brother Patras Bokhari, one of Urdu's finest humorists, lived there. At Lahore, the younger Bukhari enrolled in Oriental College and completed his Munshi Fazil, the highest degree at that time in the oriental branch of knowledge.

== Career ==
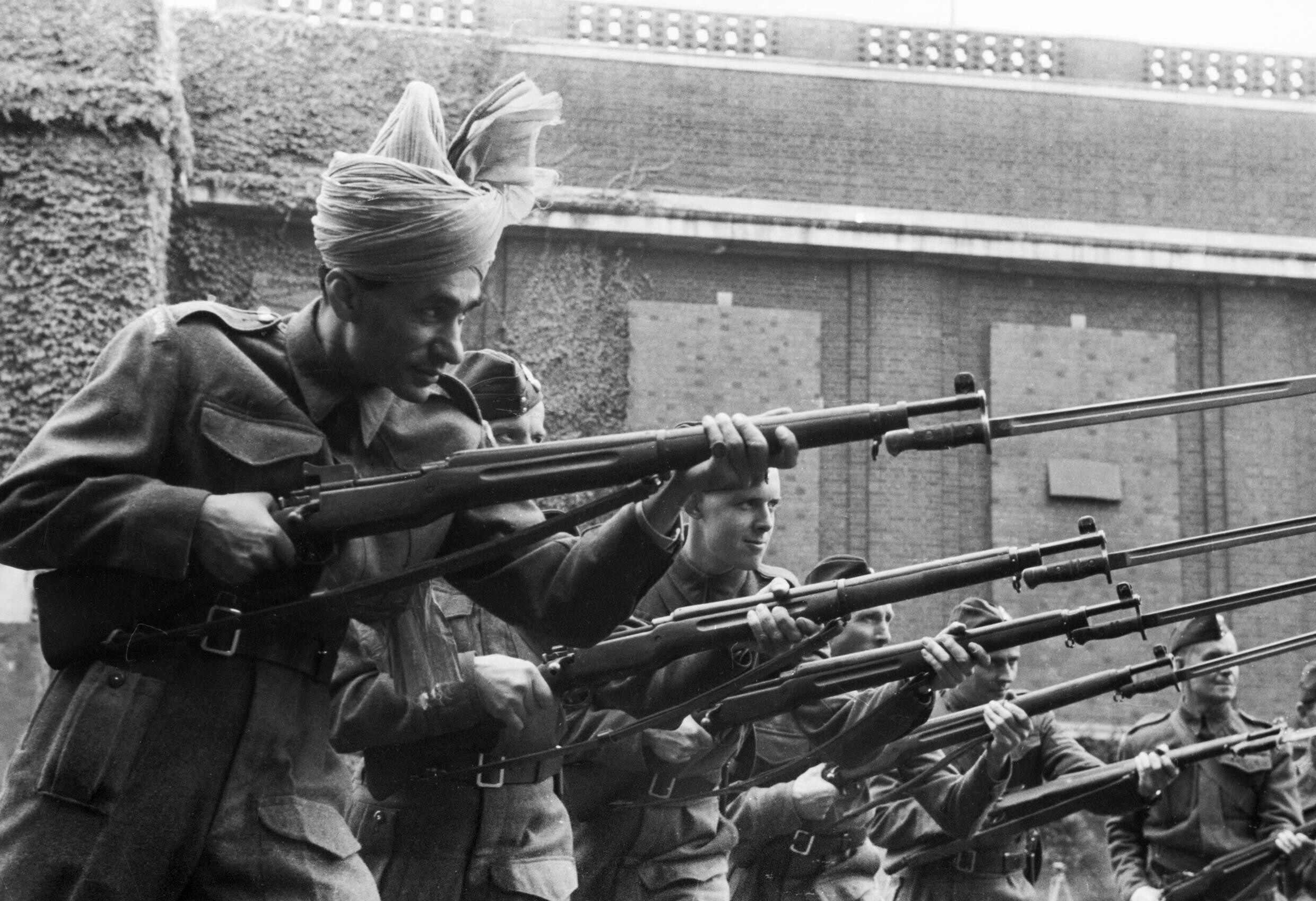
Bukhari training with the BBC Home Guard at Bedford College in 1941.

In his autobiography, Sarguzasht, Z. A. Bukhari writes: "As I came out of a tea house in Peshawar, I ran into my friend Qazi. Reading a clipping from Lahore's newspaper Tribune again and again, he was just smiling to himself. On being asked, he told me that an advertiser had invited applications, care of a post box, for someone who knew English, Urdu, Persian, Arabic, Pushto and Punjabi. The mere thought how anybody could know that many languages was making him smile. And I thought "well, I at least know a little of all of them". I stormed into a typist's shop, typed an application and mailed it, mentioning the names of Mirza Mohammad Saeed Dehlvi and Dr Mohammad Iqbal as references."

The advertisement was from Shimla's Board of Examiners (an institution established in British India to teach vernaculars to the British officers) and Bukhari was selected for the post. This was back in 1925 and he was 21. He became a Munshi or (a teacher) and was ultimately promoted as the head of the bureau of translation. Besides his profession, Z. A. Bukhari also took part in theatrical activities.

One of Bukhari's British students at Shimla was later posted as Assistant District Commissioner to the then governor of Punjab. And when the government decided to run the radio service in a professional manner and from London sent Lionel Fieldon – a maverick war veteran – to set up a full-fledged broadcasting station in 1935 in Delhi, that student of Bukhari's recommended and introduced Bukhari to Fieldon. Z. A. Bukhari's talents blossomed when the British decided to run the radio in a professional manner and launched a broadcasting station in Delhi. Sir Malcolm Darling recruited Bukhari on the recommendation of the controller of broadcasting for All India Radio, Lionel Fielden, to set up the Indian section of the Eastern Service. Initially Bukhari and his team only contributed a weekly news report and an occasional cultural programme. Bukhari was trained by Fielden in the art of broadcasting. Bukhari was then appointed at the newly established AIR (Akashvani (radio broadcaster)) Delhi station as programme director.

In 1939, Bukhari, as a Station Director of AIR (Akashvani (radio broadcaster)) Delhi station, got transferred to Bombay (now Mumbai) station of AIR.

Z. A. Bukhari helped the Bombay radio station make a lot of improvements. There were many people at Bombay radio station he helped like the film playback singers, G. M. Durrani, Suraiya. Durrani called Zulfiqar Ali Bukhari his 'Ustad' (teacher) to show him respect.

After the Partition of India and creation of Pakistan, he was made the first director-general of Radio Pakistan (Pakistan Broadcasting Corporation) (then known as Pakistan Broadcasting Service on 14 August 1947, when Pakistan emerged on the world map as a new country). The most important thing is that the independence of Pakistan was announced through Radio Pakistan on 13 August 1947 at 11:59 pm. Zulfiqar Ali Bukhari retired from the radio in 1959.

After General Ayub Khan came to power in October 1958, he came to the broadcasting house of Radio Pakistan for his first address to the nation, somehow the director-general Z. A. Bukhari, unknowingly offended him. Right away, Ayub Khan showed his dislike for Z. A. Bukhari, who was soon sent into forced early retirement in 1959.

In 1967, he served as the first general manager of PTV-Karachi Center (Pakistan Television Corporation) as it started broadcasting in the city of Karachi.

== Personality ==
Bukhari was a workaholic. With his immense energies and love for broadcasting, he worked at the radio station till late into the night. Nasrullah Khan in his book Kya Qafal Jata Hai has described how Bukhari would sit with singers, guide them, compose new tunes and would even sing with them. He introduced many innovative ideas at radio stations. He would write many programmes and broadcast them, too, including marsiyas in the month of Muharram.

A hard taskmaster and a man who had been immersed in culture and literature, Bukhari did not tolerate slights in broadcasting and especially emphasized the correct Urdu pronunciation. Some experts were especially hired by him to check and correct the pronunciation of artists. During Bukhari's tenure, the radio station was a place frequented by intellectuals, writers, musicians, poets and scholars. He turned Radio Pakistan into an institution where raw hands got their early training and later went ahead in search of greener pastures. A great many of them, trained by him, became celebrities in their respective fields.

According to a major Pakistani English-language newspaper The Friday Times:

Zulfiqar was eccentric from the very beginning, rebellious and quarrelsome, an under-achiever in education who was to rise to great heights as a broadcaster. Zulfiqar failed to go to college and graduated in munshi-fazil and adeeb-alim courses. Zulfiqar arose to be Pakistan's greatest broadcaster. He set up the BBC Urdu Service in 1939 and stayed in London through the war years while his family lodged with Ahmed Shah's family.

== Literary work ==
Syed Ghulam Husain Jafri has authored a book on Bokhari called "Baba-e-Nasharyaat: Marconi say Bokhari Tak". In this book the author has traced the history of radio from its invention to establishment of BBC, All India Radio and Radio Pakistan and has tried to narrate the biography of Mr Z.A Bukhari. Mr. Ghulam Husain Jafri has the credit to have detailed discussion with him for about 2 years during his service at Radio Pakistan.

A detailed commentary can be found on Mirza Zafar-ul-Hasan, Bukhari's friend and colleague at Radio Pakistan and a writer in his own right, published a special issue of Ghalib, a quarterly published by Idara-i-Yadgar-i-Ghalib, on Bukhari posthumously. He also compiled Yad-i-Yar-i-Mehrban, a book on Bukhari. Both the publications contain Bukhari's satire columns and some transcriptions of his broadcasts, including the rare ones broadcast by him in Urdu from the BBC during his stay in London.

Bukhari's other books include Sarguzasht, an autobiography, Jo Kuchh Main Ne Kaha, a collection of his verses and Raag Darya, a book on classical music of Pakistan and India.

== Death and legacy ==
Z.A. Bukhari died in Karachi on 12 July 1975 at age 71. An auditorium at Pakistan Broadcasting Corporation building in Islamabad is named in his honor recognizing his services to broadcasting in Pakistan.
