= Apradhi Kaun? =

Apradhi Kaun may refer to:

- Apradhi Kaun? (1957 film), 1957 Indian film directed by Asit Sen
- Apradhi Kaun!, a 1981 Indian TV series on DD National, starring Kavita Chaudhary
- Apradhi Kaun? (1982 film), 1982 Indian film

== See also ==
- Apradhi (disambiguation)
