= G. M. Durrani =

Ghulam Mustafa Durrani

Background information
- Also known as: G.M.D. Sahab, Durrani Ji, Durrani Sahab, G.M. Sahab
- Born: 8 September 1919; Peshawar, British India
- Origin: Mumbai, Maharashtra, India (Nationality-Indian)
- Died: 8 September 1988 (aged 68–69) Mumbai, Maharashtra, India
- Genres: Bhajan; Filmi Devotional songs; Ghazal; Qawwali; Playback singing; Classical music; Patriotic songs
- Occupations: Singer, actor, music director, composer, radio drama artist
- Instruments: Vocalist, harmonium, tanpura
- Years active: 1935–1978
- Labels: Saregama; Columbia Records

Ghulam Mustafa Durrani (1919 – 8 September 1988; sometimes known as G. M. Durrani) was an Indian radio drama artist, playback singer, actor and music director.

== Singer in many languages ==
Ghulam Mustafa Durrani was fond of music since childhood and was a radio drama artist and full-time singer of Lahore station, Delhi station and Mumbai station of AIR (Akashvani (radio broadcaster)) at a salary of Rupees 70 per month. His native language was Pashto, but he had a strong command over Hindi, Urdu and Punjabi languages. He sang in many Indian languages including Hindi, Urdu, Punjabi and Pashto language in Indian movies in the 1930s, 1940s and 1950s. After the 1950s, Durrani sang very few songs. Durrani was the disciple of radio broadcaster Zulfiqar Ali Bukhari, and Durrani also called Rafiq Ghaznavi 'my Guru'.

To his credit, he tried to create his own identity as a playback singer and tried not to follow the then popular K. L. Saigal style of singing. Durrani was notable for sad songs, romantic songs, patriotic songs, Qur'an khawani, Qawwalis, Ghazals and Bhajans. He was also one of the first Muslim singers to sing Hindu devotional songs.

== Early life ==
Ghulam Mustafa Durrani was born in Peshawar, British India in 1919. He was a Pathan (Pashtuns) and belonged to the Mohammad Zai tribe. He should not be confused as a direct descendant or have any relation with Ahmad Shah Durrani – founder of Afghanistan.

== Family ==
His mother died when he was very young. His father was educated and of artistic mind, but very strict, and the only ally at the home was his loving grandmother. But she could also not protect him from his father's anger.

== Marriage ==
Durrani's Wife Jyoti (her real name was Sitara Begum)

Durrani married actress Jyoti (real name was Sitara Begum). Jyoti was the younger sister of actress Wahidan, who acted in many movies, including Alibaba. Wahidan's daughter Nimmi was to become a big actress in the 1950s, too.

== Career ==
=== In Peshawar ===
The last job Durrani did in Peshawar was at a painter's shop where an artist always used to hum the tunes of the songs composed by highly respected Composer and Actor Rafiq Ghaznavi. He also started imitating those songs and got appreciation from the colleagues which inspired him. Durrani started practising Rafiq Ghaznavi's songs and assumed him as his master. During this time, his father took him to another job at his uncle's motor-part shop. But the artist within didn't stay long there and Durrani ran away from home to Lahore, with only 22 rupees in his pocket.

=== In Lahore ===
In Lahore, Durrani did odd jobs along with singing on radio. This brought him fame and passion for radio singing which took him to Delhi first, then to Bombay. He came to Bombay (now Mumbai) on 14 April 1935. In Mumbai, he somehow got a job at Mumbai Radio Station, and from there he got recognition. Filmwallahs started calling on him to sing.

=== In Mumbai ===
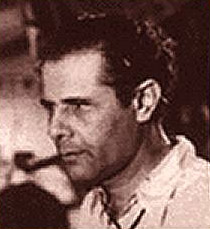
Durrani's Bollywood Guru, Sohrab Modi

His singing career started from AIR (Akashvani (radio broadcaster)). Durrani was discovered by film producer Sohrab Modi, when he was approximately 16 years old. Modi gave him his first chance around 1935 or 1936 in the movie Said-e-Havas, a historical under the music director, classical musician Bundu Khan, popularly known as "Taan-Talwar" Bundu Khan. It was a ghazal, whose words were:

"Mastonko shem farz hai peena Sharab ka,
gutti mein meri padh gaya qatara sharab ka"

The English Translation of this Ghazal: "The happy-go-lucky people imbibe liquor for euphoria but I drink because my first morsel of food had a drop of liquor in it."

=== In Delhi ===
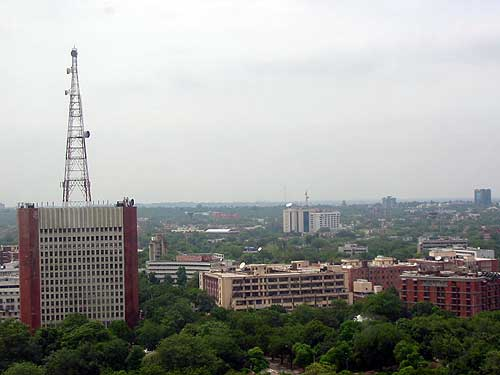
Akashvani Bhavan in Delhi

When Durrani came to Bombay, the playback system was not there, and one had to act on-screen. He didn't like running around trees and refused to work further. He faced a lot of difficulties and could not return as people would call him a "Kanjar". Minerva was to close down soon, too. He soon joined the Delhi Radio Station of AIR (Akashvani (radio broadcaster)) and later quit this job on 31 December 1940.

Durrani was working at the Delhi Radio Station where he got acquainted with poet Behzad Lucknavi, whose many ghazals had been sung by Mallika-e-Ghazal (Queen of Ghazals) Begum Akhtar.

=== Shift to Mumbai ===
He later shifted to the Mumbai Radio Station where he met a big personality at the time, whom he considered one of his ustads (master), Station Director of Bombay station of AIR (Akashvani (radio broadcaster)), Baba-e-Nasharayat (Father of Broadcasting) Zulfiqar Ali Bukhari, who helped the radio station advance. Durrani called Zulfiqar Ali Bukhari "Ustad", to honour him. (Z. A. Bukhari, was the Station Director of Delhi station and Bombay station of AIR (Akashvani (radio broadcaster)). After the Partition of India and creation of Pakistan, Bukhari was made first director-general of Radio Pakistan (Pakistan Broadcasting Corporation) and later, he served as general manager of PTV (Pakistan Television Corporation)).

G. M. Durrani's salary was soon fixed at Rs. 40 per month. Here, he was working as a 'Drama Artist'. He was soon counted as one of the best drama artists on the radio at that time. Over a period of three years, his salary had gone up to Rs. 70 per month. But fate would soon call him back to films.

Later, in 1939–40, when the concept of playback singing started, he was the first to lend his voice for a film titled Bahurani. The film was made by Sagar Movietone and its music director was Rafiq Ghaznavi. Durrani was then working as a full-time Singer in AIR (Akashvani (radio broadcaster)). Those were British days and they were not allowed to do any private recordings. But Ghaznavi insisted. Durrani laid down some conditions, like; the recording should be fixed on a Sunday night so that no outsiders would be allowed to enter the studio. Secondly, he said that his name shouldn't appear in credit titles or on discs. The song was a duet with Miss Rose, an Anglo-Indian, who didn't have much experience as a singer. He was paid Rs. 75 for the song as against his salary of Rs. 70 a month at AIR (Akashvani (radio broadcaster)). He then chucked his job on 31 December 1940 and decided to concentrate fully on his film career.

Thereafter, he sang for, among others, noted music directors such as Khawaja Khurshid Anwar, his friend Naushad, Shankar Rao Vyas and A. R. Qureshi, (Better known as Alla Rakha, Pandit Ravi Shanker's famous tabla accompanist), for films like Mirza Ghalib, Humlog, Magroor, Shama, Namaste, Sabak and scores of others. He became very popular. Many singers started their careers with him and he inspired many others too.

He was the idol of Mohammed Rafi, who imitated him in the early days. In fact, in 1944, Rafi recorded what he considered his first Hindi language song for the film Gaon ki Gori (1944) for Shyam Sunder, "Aji Dil Ho Kaaboo Mein To Dildaar Ki Aisi Taisi", with G. M. Durrani and chorus.

Geeta Dutt also started her career in her breakthrough movie, Do Bhai, with the song "Aaj Preet Ka Naata Toot Gaya", a duet with G. M. Durrani, for S. D. Burman.

Similarly, "Haye Chorre Ki Jaat Badi Bewafa", a duet with G. M. Durrani, was Lata's first song for composer, Naushad.

Durrani has sung many songs during his career. His output later reduced. According to one story, he was influenced not to sing for some time after his Hajj visit and Rafi then helped him get back to singing, but by then his career was over. Music composer Khawaja Khurshid Anwar, in his first film, Kurmai (Punjabi-1941) took Durrani as his assistant and later gave him the film Angoori (1943) as music director.

== Popularity ==
In the period of K. L. Saigal, Surinder, Khan Mastana and G.M. Durrani were also famous. G. M. Durrani was one of the 40s famous playback singers. Durrani tried to make his own identity as a playback singer and not try to follow the K. L. Saigal style of singing. G. M. Durrani was a legendary Bollywood playback singer. His singing style was to inspire Rafi and others in the years to come. Later G. M. Durrani became a model to many playback singers who followed. The soulful renditions of Durrani were to be reminded of by Talat's singing as well.

Mohammed Rafi was influenced most notably, by G. M. Durrani, on whose style he based his singing. He sang with his idol in some of the songs such as "Humko Hanste Dekh Zamana Jalta Hai" (Hum Sab Chor Hain, 1956) and "Khabar Kisi Ko Nahiin, Woh Kidhar Dekhte" (Beqasoor, 1950).

G. M. Durrani considered that his first famous song was "Duniya Mein Sab Jode Jode" in the film Sharda (1942), composed by Naushad.

The song "Neend Hamaari Khwaab Tumhaare Kitne Meethe Kitne Pyaare", that made him a real rage, was however, composed by Shyam Sundar, for his movie Nai Kahani. This song, sung mostly by G. M. Durrani, with some support by child-star Balakram was playing everywhere. When he sang this song, the listeners went crazy. This timeless melody can never be forgotten by fans of Indian Cinema.

Nearly 40 years later, when Tata Oil Mills did a program, Mortal Men Immortal Melodies, to celebrate fifty years of talkies in India, they invited him to re-render the song. Although many had forgotten him, his voice was still great and he got applause for it.

== Filmography ==
=== As actor ===
- Mumtaz Mahal (1957) (Director – Ram Daryani)
- Bhola Shikaar (1958) (Director – Akkoo)
- Bhumika (1977) (Director – Shyam Benegal, Producers – Lalit Mohan Bijlani, Freni Variava)
- Hum Log (1951)
- Aasman (1952)
- Yaad (1942)
- Ardhangini (1959)
- State Express (1938)
- Qismat Palat Ke Dekh
- Baharen Phir Bhi Aayengi
- Jawab Aayega
- Kaise Kahun (1964) (Director – Atma Ram, Producer – Ram Bellara)
- Zamana Badal Gaya
- Baghi Haseena
- Shree Krishna Bhakti (1955)
- Pran Jaye Par Vachan Na Jaye
- Lal Patthar (1971) (Director – Sushil Majumdar, Producer – F. C. Mehra, Eagle Films)
- Love & God
- Besharam (1978) (Director – Deven Verma, Producer – Deven Verma)
- Teesra Kaun (1965) (Director – Mohammed Hussain, Producer – B. D. Kapoor)

=== As singer ===
- Aaj Ki Raat (1948)
- Aabroo (1968)
- Actor (1951)
- Aadmi (1958)
- Akash Pari (1958)
- Aan Baan (1943)
- Anand Bhavan (1953)
- Awara Shahzadi (1956)
- Aiye (1949)
- Akalmand (1966)
- Aparadhi (1949)
- Baghdad (1952)
- Bade Bhaiya
- Badshah Salamat (1956)
- Bazaar (1949)
- Beqasoor (1950)
- Bazooband (1954)
- Bhai Jaan (1945)
- Bharat Milap (1942)
- But Taraash (1951)
- Chand (1944)
- Chandni Raat (1949)
- Chhed Chhad (1943)
- Chhoti Si Duniya (1953)
- Churiyaan (1942)
- Dada (1949)
- Darshan (1941)
- Deedar (1951)
- Dil Ki Basti (1949)
- Diwani (1947)
- Dhadkan (1946)
- Dhoop Chaon (1954)
- Do Bhai (1947)
- Doli (1947)
- Dolti Naiya (1950)
- Dukhiyari (1948)
- Ek Din Ka Sultan (1945)
- Ek Tha Ladka (1951)
- Ek Thi Ladki
- Ek Roz (1947)
- Ek-Do-Teen (1953)
- Gaon Ki Gori (1945)
- Geet Govind (1947)
- Ghar Ki Izzat (1948)
- Ghayal (1951)
- Gokul (1946)
- Gumashta (1951)
- Gul-E-Bakavali (1956)
- Hamaari Shaan
- Hanste Aansoo (1950)
- Heer Ranjha (1948)
- Hip Hip Hurray (1948)
- Hum Log (1951)
- Hum Sab Chor Hain (1956)
- Ishara
- Izzat (1952)
- Jalte Deep (1950)
- Jungle Ki Duniya (1959)
- Jeevan Taara (1951)
- Jwalamukhi (unreleased)
- Kaale Baadal (1950)
- Karwan (1956)
- Kavita (1944)
- Kaneez (1949)
- Khel (1950)
- Khushboo (1954)
- Koshish (1943)
- Kurmai (1941)
- Kuldeep (1946)
- Laadla (1954)
- Laaj (1946)
- Lakeeren (1954)
- Lalkaar (1944)
- Lal Patthar (1971)
- Lara Lappa (Punjabi)
- Madhubala (1950)
- Magroor (1950)
- Maang (1950)
- Meharbani (1950)
- Man Ka Meet (1950)
- Meharbani (1950)
- Mitti (1947)
- Mirza Sahiban (1947)
- Musafir Khana (1955)
- Nai Duniya (1942)
- Nai Kahani (1943)
- Namaste (1943)
- Nargis (1946)
- Naqab Posh (1956)
- Nazare (1949)
- Neelampari (1952)
- Nili (1950)
- Nishan Danka (1952)
- Nirmal (1952)
- Pehli Shaadi (1953)
- Pathala Bhairavi (1952)
- Pehle Aap (1944)
- Pyar Ki Baaten (1951)
- Ramayan (1954)
- Romeo And Juliet (1947)
- Samrat Chandragupt (1945)
- Sansar (1951)
- Sassi Punnu (1946)
- Shair
- Shama (1946)
- Sharda (1942)
- Sheikh Chilli (1956)
- Shikar (1955)
- Sohni Mahiwal (1946)
- Station Master
- Suhaag Sindoor (1953)
- Sunehre Din (1949)
- Sunehre Qadam (1966)
- Usha Kiran (1952)
- Veer Arjun (1952)
- Vikramaditya (1945)
- Yateem (1945)
- Zara Bachke, etc.

=== As music director ===
The legendary Filmmaker, writer, Director and Music composer Khawaja Khurshid Anwar took G. M. Durrani in his first film, Kurmai (Punjabi-1941) as his assistant.

Durrani also assisted his friend Naushad for his movies around this time and big break for him was coming soon in the form of the movie Nai Duniya (1942).

G. M. Durrani composed the songs in these films:

- Vijay Laxmi (1943)
  - Barto Sudeshi Bano Sudeshi (Singer – G. M. Durrani, Music Director – G. M. Durrani, Lyricists – Neelkanth Tiwari, Kailash Matwala, J. S. Kashyap)
  - Chale Charan More Kunjan Ki Ore (Music Director – G. M. Durrani, Lyricists – Neelkanth Tiwari, Kailash Matwala, J. S. Kashyap)
  - Hum Jaan Gaye Re (Singer – Rajkumari, Music Director – G.M. Durrani, Lyricists – Neelkanth Tiwari, Kailash Matwala, J. S. Kashyap)
  - Is Bekaraar Dil Ko (Singer – Rajkumari, Music Director – G. M. Durrani, Lyricists – Neelkanth Tiwari, Kailash Matwala, J. S. Kashyap)
  - Koi Aaya Chamak Uthi (Music Director – G. M. Durrani, Lyricists – Neelkanth Tiwari, Kailash Matwala, J. S. Kashyap)
  - Matlab Hai Mil Jaane Se (Music Director – G. M. Durrani, Lyricists – Neelkanth Tiwari, Kailash Matwala, J. S. Kashyap)
  - Uyi Main Lut Gayi (Singer – Zohrabai, G. M. Durrani, Music Director – G. M. Durrani, Lyricists – Neelkanth Tiwari, Kailash Matwala, J. S. Kashyap)
  - Ye Naina Bade Deewane (Music Director – G. M. Durrani, Lyricists – Neelkanth Tiwari, Kailash Matwala, J. S. Kashyap)
- Angoori (1943)
  - Aa Kar Le Mann Ka Mol (Singers – G. M. Durrani & Rajkumari, Music Director – G. M. Durrani, Lyricist – Rammurti Chaturvedi)
  - Angoori Angoori Pyaala (Singer – A. D. Kunwar, Music Director – G. M. Durrani, Lyricist – Rammurti Chaturvedi)
  - Jeet Liyo Jeet Liyo Jeet Liyo Re (Music Director – G. M. Durrani, Lyricist-Rammurti Chaturvedi)
  - Kaahe Tihar Jiya Daale (Singers – Various, Music Director – G. M. Durrani, Lyricist – Rammurti Chaturvedi)
  - Loot Liyo Re (Singers – Various, Music Director – G. M. Durrani, Lyricist – Rammurti Chaturvedi)
  - Man Hai Ek Paheli (Singer – G. M. Durrani, Music Director – G. M. Durrani, Lyricist – Rammurti Chaturvedi)
  - Main Na Jaihaun Akeli Bajariya (Singer – Kaushalya, Music Director – G. M. Durrani, Lyricist – Rammurti Chaturvedi)
  - Nainon Mein Naina Deenhon Daal (Singers – G. M. Durrani & Kaushalya, Music Director – G. M. Durrani, Lyricist – Rammurti Chaturvedi)
  - Sambhaal Ke Jaiyo Sakhi (Singer – G. M. Durrani, Music Director – G. M. Durrani, Lyricist – Rammurti Chaturvedi)
- Bhagya Laxmi (1944)
  - Ho Mujhse Aaj Kaun Dhanwan (Music Directors – G. M. Durrani, P. C. Dey)
  - Khaali Hai Daaman-E-Murad (Singer – Shanta Apte, Music Directors – G. M. Durrani, P. C. Dey)
  - Krishna Piya Ko Rijhana Aali (Music Directors – G. M. Durrani, P. C. Dey)
  - Meri Binti Suni Girdhari (Singer – Shanta Apte, Music Directors – G. M. Durrani, P. C. Dey)
  - More Aangan Mein Chanda Lutaye Kiran (Music Directors – G. M. Durrani, P. C. Dey)
  - O Baadal Babul Se Kahiyo (Music Directors – G. M. Durrani, P. C. Dey)
  - Saawariya Jab Se Milaye Nain (Music Directors – G. M. Durrani, P. C. Dey)
  - So Jaa Rajdulari So Jaa (Music Directors – G. M. Durrani, P. C. Dey)
- Dhadkan (1946)
  - Aaye Doli Uthane Kahaar (Music Director – G. M. Durrani)
  - Baanka Raseela Mora Baalam (Music Director – G. M. Durrani)
  - Dil Dheer Na Dhare (Music Director – G. M. Durrani)
  - Dil Pehloo Se Uchhla Jaaye (Music Director – G. M. Durrani)
  - Jab Se Gaye Ho (Music Director – G. M. Durrani)
  - Jo Dard Basaya Tha (Music Director – G. M. Durrani)
  - Hum Mast Hawa Ke Jhonke Se (Singer – G. M. Durrani, Music Director – G. M. Durrani, Lyricist – Zahoor Raja)
  - Maalik Mere Accha Nahin Dukhiyon Ko (Music Director – G. M. Durrani)
  - Shab-E-Gham Aap Mere Paas (Music Director – G. M. Durrani, Lyricist-Zahoor Raja)

== Selected songs ==
=== Solo Songs ===
- Gul-E-Bakavali (1956) – Maaya Badi Bairan Tu – (Lyricists – Pyarelal Santoshi, Music Director – Gyan Dutt)
- Gul-E-Bakavali (1956) – Nagaawali Raj Hai Bakaavali Rani Hai – (Lyricist – Pyarelal Santoshi, Music Director – Gyan Dutt)
- Actor (1951) – Dil Tere Hijr Main Beemar Hai – (Lyricists – Nazim Panipati, Music Directors – Aziz Hindi, Mohammed Ibrahim)
- Awara Shahzadi (1956) – Nabi Ne Chahne Wale Nirali Shaan – (Music Director – Jimmy, Lyricist – Khawar Zaman)
- Ek Din Ka Sultan (1945) – Falak Ke Chand Ka Hamne Jawab Dekh Liya – (M.D. – Shanti Kumar)
- Ek Din Ka Sultan – Kisi Ke Kooche Mein Gardan Kataane Jaate Hain – (M.D. – Rafiq Ghaznavi)
- Aiye (1949) – Itni Si Kahani Hai – (Lyricist – Nakhshab Jarchvi, M.D. – Naushad)
- Aiye – Jigar Ke Tukde Hain Dil Ke Tukde – (M.D – Naushad)
- Aparadhi (1949) – Zindagani Ka Maza Shadi Mein Hain – (M.D. – Suresh Phadke)
- Nargis (1946) – Ye To Bata Mere Khuda
- Kuldeep (1946) – Aye Chand Sitaro
- Sharda (1942) – It Jaaye Ut Jaaye Nazariya Doley Ri
- Sharda (1942) – Duniya Mein Sab Jodey Jodey
- Sharda (1942) – Balahaari Re Kukadakun Bol
- Doli (1947) – Khel Nahi Gir Gir Ke Sambhalna – (Lyricist – Majrooh Sultanpuri, Music Director – Ghulam Mohammad)
- Chhoti Si Duniya (1953) – Is Toote Huye Dil Ka
- Chhed Chhad (1943) – Pee Kahaan Pee Kahaan – (Lyricists – Tanveer Ghazi, Music Director – Mushtaq Hussain)
- Chand (1944) – Aye Dil Mujhe Rone De – (Lyricists – Qamar Jalalabadi, Music Director – Husnlal Bhagatram)
- But Taraash (1951) – Ab Kaun Hai Is Tute Hue Dil Ka
- Bazaar (1949) – Pee Aaye Aakar Chal Bhi Diye
- Kaale Baadal (1950) – Kisi Bedard Ne Aisa Jalaya
- Nai Kahani (1943) – Hame kya hame kya
- Chand (1944) – Samjhe The Jise Apna
- Romeo And Juliet (1947) – Tumhe Sitaro Ne
- Ek Roz (1947) – Toota Hua Dil
- Ek Roz (1947) – Ek Bewafa Ne
- Darshan (1941) – Pardesi Babu
- Darshan (1941) – Main Pee Darshan
- Dolti Naiya (1950) – Meri Zindagi Bhi
- Jalte Deep (1950) – Nayi Ek Duniya
- Aaj Ki Raat (1948) – Pyaar Ki Shama
- Maang (1950) – Main Kisko Sunau
- Lakeeren (1954) – Mere Maalik Meri Kismat
- Pehle Aap (1944) – Dil Ke Pat Khol Ke
- Bhai Jaan (1945) – Aa Hosh Mein Deewano
- Madhubala (1950) – Ye Duniya Hai Bewafai Ki
- Madhubala (1950) – Kisi Ko Yaad Karta Hai
- Madhubala (1950) – Nayi Jawani Rut Mastani
- Dukhiyari (1948) – Ab Kisko Sunaane Chali
- Bazooband (1954) – Diya Bujhaao Jhatpat Jhatpat
- Yateem (1945) – Main Usse Karoon Pyar – (Lyricist – Ziya Sarhadi)
- Khel (1950) – Hamein Ab Ye Jeena Ghawara – (Lyricist – Behzad Lucknavi, Music Director – Sajjad Hussain)
- Khel (1950) – Apni Mehfil Mein Phir Ik Baar – (Lyricists – Jan Nisar Akhtar, Music Composer – Sajjad Hussain)
- Mirza Sahiban – Khayegi Thokaren Jawani

=== Songs with Other Singers ===
Durrani with other Singers

==== Songs with Amirbai Karnataki ====
- Aan Baan (1943) – Bolay mann ki maina – (M.D – Gyan Dutt)
- Samrat Chandragupt (1945) – Aa Badla Hai Zamanaa – (Lyrics – Buddhi Chandra, M.D – C. Ramchandra)
- Diwani (1947) – Wafayein hamari na tum aazmana – (M.D – Gyan Dutt)

==== Songs with Asha Bhosle ====
- Bade Bhaiya – Maine Jab Se Tumko Dekha Hai
- Ek-Do-Teen (1953) – Thumak-Thumak Chali Kaamini – (M.D. – Vinod ER)
- Pyar Ki Baaten (1951) – Wo Hamse Mohabbat Kerte Hain – (M.D. – Khayyam)
- Jeevan Taara (1951) – O Chhup Chhup Ke Sapnon Mein Aata Hai Kaun – (M.D. – Vasant Desai, Lyrics – Prem Dhawan)
- Pyar Ki Baaten (1951) – Unko Rupye Me – (M.D – Bulo C. Rani & Khayyam)
- Khushboo (1954) – Udhar Chand Nikla – (M.D – Shankar lal)
- Sandesh (1952) – Nas Nas Mein Meri

==== Songs with Bhupinder Singh (musician) ====
- Akalmand (1966) – O Bekhabar Tujh Kya Pata – (with Mahendra Kapoor)

==== Songs with Faiyaz Mohammed ====
- Akash Pari (1958) – Rum Pum Pum Pum

==== Songs with Geeta Dutt ====
- Do Bhai (1947) – Aaj preet ka naata toot gaya (Lyricist -Raja Mehdi Ali Khan, Music Director – S. D. Burman)
- Geet Govind (1947) – Chamkat damkat damini (M.D. – Gyan Dutt) – with Abha
- Geet Govind (1947) – Viyogan deepshikha si jare (M.D. – Gyan Dutt) (with Rekharani)
- Heer Ranjha (1948) – Kafas ki qaid mein humko (M.D. – Aziz Khan)
- Hip Hip Hurray (1948) – Hip hip hurray-2, Dubeyji ko pakwan mila (M.D. – Hanuman Prasad)
- Hip Hip Hurray (1948) – Jawani Hum Guzare (with Shamshad Begum)
- Dil Ki Basti (1949) – Yahi hai dil ki basti (M.D. – Ghulam Mohammed)
- Dil Ki Basti (1949) – Kadam hai...nazuk dil hai tod na dena (M.D. – Ghulam Mohammed)
- Nazare (1949) – Mere man mein dol (M.D. – Bulo C. Rani)
- Nazare (1949) – Milate ho usiko (M.D. – Bulo C. Rani)
- Nazare (1949) – Duniya ki andheri raat mein (M.D. – Bulo C. Rani) – with Shamshad Begum
- Nazare (1949) – Bahar aayi chaman (M.D. – Bulo C. Rani) – with Shamshad Begum
- Dilruba (1950) – Humne khai hai mohabbat mein (M.D. – Gyan Dutt)
- Jalte Deep (1950) – Nai ek duniya basayenge (M.D. – Sardul Kwatra)
- Khel (1950) – Teri nazaron ne mere seene pe fire kar diya (Lyricists – Khawar Zaman, M.D. – Sajjad Hussain)
- Man Ka Meet (1950) – Machalta hua yeh dil (M.D. – Sardul Kwatra)
- Deedar (1951) – Nazar phero na humse (M.D. – Shakeel Badayuni) – with Shamshad Begum
- Ghayal (1951) – O rani mainawati (M.D. – Gyan Dutt) – with Meena Kapoor
- Ghayal (1951) – Daiya re daiya (M.D. – Gyan Dutt) – with Meena Kapoor
- Sansar (1951) – Lucknow chalo ab rani (M.D. – Parthasarti, E. S. Shashtri, B. S. Kalla)
- Baghdad (1952) – Dile beqarar kahe baar baar (M.D. – Bulo C. Rani)
- Baghdad (1952) – Yeh pyar ki baatein (M.D. – Bulo C. Rani) – with Talat
- Neelampari (1952) – Jab tak chamke chand (M.D. – Khawaja Khurshid Anwar)
- Nirmal (1952) – Tu jo mere pyar ki khichdi pakayega (M.D. – Bulo C. Rani)
- Patal Bhairavi (1952) – Jaoongi maike jaaongi (M.D. – Ghantsala)
- Usha Kiran (1952) – Jago jago jago bhor suhani (M.D. – Hanuman Prasad) – with Zohra and Asha
- Pehli Shaadi (1953) – Tum haan kah do (M.D. – Robin Chatterji)
- Awara Shahzadi (1956) – Hum tum se raazi (M.D. – Jimmy)
- Badshah Salamat (1956) – Dil ke darwaze mein hui khatkhat (M.D. – Bulo C. Rani)
- Sheikh Chilli (1956) – Madhoshi mein tanhai mein (M.D. – Vinod ER)
- Akashpari (1958) – Ho gaye barbad hum acchha hua (M.D. – Inayat Ali)
- Akashpari (1958) – Ho khel nahin dil se voh dil ka lagana (M.D. – Inayat Ali)
- Jwalamukhi (unreleased) – Tum tana tum tana...balam koi karke bahana, chupke se chod na jana
- non-film patriotic (1950) – Vande matram
- Lakeeren (1954) – Aabaad Jahaan Barbaad Kiya

==== Songs with Iqbal Begum ====
- Kurmai (Panjabi) (1941) – Gote Da Haar Ve -(with Rajkumari Dubey)

==== Songs with Kishore Kumar ====
- Hamaari Shaan – Damdi damdi paisa paisa jod jod kar – (with Talat Mahmood), lyrics Anjum Jaipuri, music Chitragupta

==== Songs with Khan Mastana ====
- Sunehre Din (1949) – Jiya Ka Diya – (with Geeta Dutt and Shamshad Begum)
- Sunehre Din (1949) – Hum Mast Dilo Ko Lekar – (with Kalyani Das and Shamshad Begum)

==== Songs with Lata Mangeshkar ====
- Ek Thi Ladki – Lara Lappa Lara Lappa Laai Rakhda
- Chandni Raat (1949) – Haye Chhore Ki Jaat
- Shair (1949) – Do Bichhade Huye Dil
- Aiye (1949) – Kar Sakega Na Juda Tumko (M.D – Nashad)
- Aiye (1949) – Duniya Badal Gayi Ki Muqaddar Bigad Gaya (M.D. – Naushad)
- Hum Log (1951) – Gaaye chala jaa
- Anand Bhavan (1953) – Hello, hello, Mr. Dil, kaho betaab ho kisliye
- Maang (1950) – Aao Baitho Baat Suno
- Caravan (1956) – Aye Sarban Aye Sarban – (Lyricist- Tanveer Naqvi, Music Director – S. Mohinder)
- Shikar (1955) Kya Haal Hai Huzoor Ke Dil Ka

==== Songs with Mahendra Kapoor ====
- Akalmand (1966) – O Bekhabar Tujh Kya Pata – (with Bhupinder Singh (musician))

==== Songs with Manju Das ====
- Chand (1944) – Watan Se Chala Hai

==== Songs with Mohammed Rafi ====
- Sassi Punnu (1946) – Aashikon Ka Kaafila
- Ek Thi Ladki (1949) – Lara Lappa Lara Lappa Laai Rakhda
- Beqasoor (1950) – Khabar kisi ko nahin (with Mukesh) (M.D. – Anil Biswas)
- Anand Bhawan (1953) – Usey Dhoondh Hi Lenge
- Musafir Khanna (1955) – Kuchh Aankh Mili (M.D. – O. P. Nayyar)
- Zara Bachke – Aye Ishq Isse Barbad Na Kar (M.D. – Naushad)
- Gaon Ki Gori – Aji Dil Ho Kaabu Mein

==== Songs with Mukesh (singer) ====
- Beqasoor – Khabar kisi ko nahin (with Mohd. Rafi)
- Hanste Aansoo (1950) – Aise Mein Koi Chham Se

==== Songs with Noor Jehan ====
- Mirza Sahibaan (1947) – Haath Seene Pe Jo Rakh Do (Lyricist – Aziz Kashmiri, M.D. – Pandit Amarnath Husnlal Bhagatram)
- Mirza Sahibaan (1947) – Tum Aankhon Se Door Ho (M.D. – Pandit Amarnath Husnlal Bhagatram)

==== Songs with P. Susheela ====
- Gul-E-Bakavali (1956) – Bade Tum Veer Sahi Baat Badi Mat Karna (Lyricist – Pyarelal Santoshi, Music Director – Gyan Dutt)

==== Songs with Parol Ghosh ====
- Namaste (1943) – Ambua Pe Panchhi Bawara (Lyricist – D. N. Madhok, M.D. – Naushad)

==== Songs with Rajkumari Dubey ====
- Kurmai (Panjabi) (1941) – Gote Da Haar Ve (with Iqbal Begum)
- Ishara (1943) – Dheere-Dheere Bol Mere Raja (Lyricist – D. N. Madhok, M.D. – Khwaja Khurshid Anwar)
- Station Master – Baras Gayi Raam Badariya Kaari (M.D. – Naushad)
- Kavita (1944) – Udd Jaau Main Sajan Re
- Meharbani (1950) – O Tujhko Nainon
- Nai Duniya (1942) – Prem Ne Mann Mein Aag Lagayi
- Nai Duniya (1942) – Dil Loot Liya Ji
- Nai Duniya (1942) – Barasan Laagi Badariya
- Yateem (1945) – Jhuum rahi baagon men bhigi

==== Songs with Sandhya Mukhopadhyay ====
- Izzat (1952) – Ishq Me Ho Jao Barbaad
- Izzat (1952) – Tera Jhoomta Shabaab Jaise

==== Songs with Shamshad Begum ====
- Suhaag Sindoor (1953) – Ho Jaise Sawan Mein Baadal – (Lyricist – Bharat Vyas, Music Director – Suresh Kumar)
- Shama (1946) – Ek Yaad Kisiki Yaad Rahi (Ghulam Haider (composer))
- Laaj (1946) – Ab Hum Se Juda Mat Hona
- Ghar Ki Izzat (1948) – Taaron Ki Toliyon Ye Kaisa Hai
- Ghar Ki Izzat (1948) – Bahut Betakaluff Huye
- Kaneez (1949) – Tum Kya Jano Mera Mthe Ki Bindiya Ka Mol
- Deedar (1951) – Nazar Phero Na Humse (M.D. – Naushad)
- Hum Log (1951) – Bogi Bogi Bogi
- Hum Log (1951) – Gaye Chala Ja
- Dhoop Chaon (1954) – Ajeeb Rang Hai
- Naqab Posh (1956) – Ae Mere Majnu Meri (M.D. – Dhumi Khan)
- Gumashta – Tera Gora Gora Gaal
- Lara Lappa (Punjabi) – Mela Do Din Da
- Lara Lappa (Punjabi) – Akhiyan Wich Akhiyan Rehan De
- Hip Hip Hurray (1948) – Jawani Hum Guzare (with Geeta Dutt)
- Bade Bhaiya (1951) – Hello Sai Hello
- Dada (1949) – Dhil Die Jaa
- Nazaare (1949) – Puraane Chaahne Walon Se
- Sassi Punnu (1946) – Dekho Ji Kya Sama
- Mirza Sahiban (1947) – Aaj Miya ji Ko
- Ek Tha Ladka (1951) – Ek Din Tumne
- Ek Tha Ladka (1951) – More Balma
- Dada (1949) – Chal Chal Chameli

==== Songs with Sitara ====
- Aabroo (1968) – Piya Milan Ki Rut Aayi Hai
- Aabroo (1968) – Gori Baanke Naino Se chalaye Jaadua

==== Songs with Sudha Malhotra ====
- Aadmi (1958) – Nayi Nayi Ye Preet

==== Songs with Sulochana Kadam ====
- Actor (1951) – Teri Galiyon Main Aayi

==== Songs with Suraiya ====
- Aaj Ki Raat (1948) – Haa Kyun Dil Mein Mere
- Aaj Ki Raat (1948) – Mere Aansuon Meri Hasraton
- Nili (1950) – Teri Zaalim Nigaahon Ne

==== Songs with Talat Mahmood ====
- Baghdad (1952) – Yeh pyar ki baatein [M.D. – Bulo C. Rani] – with Geeta Dutt
- Hamaari Shaan – Damdi damdi paisa paisa jod jod kar (with Kishore Kumar, lyrics – Anjum Jaipuri, M.D. – Chitragupta)

==== Songs with Trilok Kapoor ====
- Laadla (1954) – Jal Tu Jalal Tu

==== Songs with Uma Devi (Tun Tun) ====
- Rashida Dulhan – Mohabat ne Chheda yeh kaisa taraana (M.D. – Ghulam Mohd.)

==== Songs with Zeenat Begum ====
- Chand (1944) – Aye Chand Bata Mujhko

==== Songs with Zohrabai Ambalewali ====
- Sohni Mahiwal (1946) – Chali Pyari Sakhi Sasural Dil Kyon Dole Na
- Sohni Mahiwal (1946) – Chenab Ke Behte Hue Paani
- Sohni Mahiwal (1946) – Oh Tujh Pe Salaam Ae Mere Nakaam-e-Mohabbat
- Lalkaar (1944) – Bhanwron Na Tab Tak
- Doli (1947) – Dilli Ki Galiyon Mein (Lyricists-Nazim Panipati, Music Director-Ghulam Mohammad)

==== Duet with other singers ====
- Hameeda Bano
- Pushpa Hans, etc.

=== Genres ===
==== Patriotic Songs ====
- Koshish – Hindustan Waalon Geeta Ke Barq Uthaao (M.D. – Bashir Dehlvi)
- Koshish – Ae Hind Ke Sapooton Jaago Hua Savera (M.D. – Bashir Dehlvi)
- Gokul (1946) – Hum Todenge (Lyricists: Qamar Jalalabadi, Music Director: Sudhir Phadke)
- Chand (1944) – Watan Se Chala Hai
- Gaon Ki Gori (1945) – Hindustan Ki Khatir
- non-film patriotic (1950) – Vande matram (with Geeta Dutt)

==== Hindu Devotional Songs ====
G. M. Durrani was one of the first Muslim singers to get to sing Hindu Devotionals.

- Bharat Milap (1942) – Raghukul Reet Sada Chali Aayi (Lyricist – Goswami Tulsidas, M.D. – Shankar Rao Vyas)
- Bharat Milap (1942) – Jhananan jhananan baaj rahi hai (with Amirbai Karnataki) (Lyricist – Goswami Tulsidas, M.D. – Shankar Rao Vyas)
- Bharat Milap (1942) – Utho Utho Hey Bharat, Maharaj raam chandra ki jay (Lyricist – Goswami Tulsidas, M.D. – Shankar Rao Vyas)
- Namaste (1943) – Aan milo morey Shyaam
- Vikramaditya (1945) – Shambho Mahadev Shankar (Lyricist – Ramesh Gupta, M.D. – Shankar Rao Vyas)
- Vikramaditya (1945) – Om Jai Jai Shankar (with Amirbai Karnataki and Manna Dey) (Lyricist – Ramesh Gupta, M.D. – Shankar Rao Vyas)
- Ramayan (1954) – Ram Chale Ram Chale Ban Chale Ram Raghuveer
- Veer Arjun (1952) – Vasudev Sutam Devam (Yadunath Dwarkanath Shyam Re Natwar Kunj Vihari)
- Gokul (1946) – Kahan Hamare Shyam Chale (Lyricists – Qamar Jalalabadi, M.D. – Sudhir Phadke)

==== Muslim Devotional Songs ====
- Awara Shahzadi (1956) – Nabi Ne Chahne Wale Nirali Shaan (M.D. – Jimmy, Lyricist – Khawar Zaman)

==== Quraan Khawani ====
- Lal Patthar (1971) – Quraan Khaani (M.D. – Shankar Jaikishan)

==== Filmi qawwali ====
- Beqasoor (1950) – Khabar kisi ko nahin (with Mukesh and Rafi) (Lyricist – Ehsaan Rizvi, M.D. – Anil Biswas)

==== Filmi-ghazal ====
- Ghayal (1951) – Hazaron khwahishein aisi ki har khwahish pe dam nikale (lyrics – Ghalib, M.D. – Gyan Dutt))

== Punjabi Songs ==
In the 40s and 50s G.M. Durrani was the senior Punjabi singer-actor from Mohammad Rafi. K.L. Saigal died on 18 January 1947. Then G. M. Durrani was the most senior Punjabi singer-actor. Durrani tried to make his own identity and style as a playback singer and not try to follow the K. L. Saigal type of singing. In future, all singers like Mohd. Rafi, Talat Mahmood, Manna Dey, Kishore Kumar etc. were influenced with Durrani. They followed the style of Durrani. Top singer Noor Jehan was expecting for duets with G. M. Durrani to be the other singers. A few songs are here:

- Lara Lappa – Mela Do Din Da (with Shamshad Begum)
- Lara Lappa – Akhiyan Wich Akhiyan Rehan De (with Shamshad Begum), etc.

== Pashto Song ==
- Mayin pa ta yam – (1940s)

== Short career ==
Manna Dey says on page 190-191 in Memories Come Alive:

"Durrani-ji had a mellifluous voice, but lacked staying power and failed to survive as a singer. To reach the heights of success, it is necessary to be practical as well and this is where Durrani-ji fell short. I learnt a great deal from his failure. I realized that when a producer spends a fortune on his film, he expects everyone in his team to put in his best effort to make it a success. And putting in one's best meant being ingenious and innovative, qualities without which an artiste is likely to get lost in the wilderness. That, precisely, is what happened to Durrani-ji and I cannot help feeling sorry for the way his career turned out."
- Manna Dey |}

== Spirituality and Death ==
G. M. Durrani had become spiritually inclined because of which he slowly left the industry. In an interview with Ameen Sayani in 1978, he said that he got bored of the materialistic world (like bungalow, motors, cars and other luxurious items) of Bollywood (Bombay Film Industry) and started avoiding film personalities. He started keeping a beard so nobody would recognize him. He sold all his luxurious items and started giving away money from his bank account to various Faqirs. Finally, he shifted to a small house and opened a general merchant shop after taking a loan.

He died in Mumbai on 8 September 1988.

== Some Famous Songs ==
A few of his famous songs are:

- Nai Kahani (1943) – Neend Hamari Khwab Tumhare
- Namaste (1943) – Dil Ke Pat khole ke dekhe
- Chaand (1944) – Ae Dil Mujhe rone De
- Nargis (1946) – Ye to bata mere khuda, lut gaya mera pyar kyun
- Shama (1946) – Ek yaad kisi ki yaad rahi (with Shamshad Begum) (Ghulam Haider (composer))
- Magroor (1950) – Hum to tere dil ke bangle mein aana mangta (with Shamshad Begum)
- Shair – Do Bichhde Huye Dil (with Lata Mangeshkar)
- Hum Log (1951) – Gaaye chala jaa (with Lata Mangeshkar)
- Kurmai (Punjabi) (1941) – Dil ainj ainj karda (Lyricist – D. N. Madhok)
- Mirza Sahiban (1947) – Haath seene pe jo rakh do to qarar aa jaye (with Noor Jehan)
- Baghdad (1952) – Dil-e beqarar kahe baar baar (with Geeta Dutt)
- Izzat (1952) – Dhoondhta hoon har jagha kahin nahin tera pata
- Hum Sab Chor Hain (1956) – Hum ko hansta dekh zamana jalta hai (with Mohd. Rafi)
- Sunehre Qadam (1966) – Ye ghar aap ka hai (with Sudha Malhotra)

== See also ==
- Bulo C. Rani
- List of Indian playback singers
- List of Pashto-language singers
