= Bhagya Laxmi =

- Directed by: Sarvottam Badami
- Starring: Shanta Apte; Prem Adib
- Music by: P.C. Dey; Music Director: G. M. Durrani
- Release date: 1944
- Country: India
- Language: Hindi

Not to be confused with Bhagyalaxmi 1943 and several other films of similar transliteration

Bhagya Laxmi is a Bollywood film. It was released in 1944.

== Cast ==
- Shanta Apte
- Prem Adib
- Vasanti
- Agha
- Rajkumari Shukla
- Moni Chatterjee
- Gulam Rasool
