= Rishta Hai Pyar Ka =

1967 film

Rishta hai pyar ka
- Directed by: Qamar Zaidi
- Produced by: Iqbal Butt, Fazal Kareem
- Starring: Waheed Murad; Zeba; Iqbal Yousuf; Hanif; Farida; Adeeb
- Music by: Nashad
- Release date: 6 October 1967
- Running time: 180 minutes
- Country: Pakistan
- Language: Urdu

Rishta Hai Pyar Ka is a Pakistani Urdu black-and-white film directed by Qamar Zaidi and produced by Iqbal Butt & Fazal Kareem. The film cast Waheed Murad, Zeba, Iqbal Yousuf, Hanif, Farida and Adeeb.

Rishta Hai Pyar Ka is cited as the first Lollywood film to be filmed abroad – Beirut, London and Paris.

== Cast ==
- Zeba
- Waheed Murad
- Hanif
- Iqbal Yousuf
- Trannum
- Adeeb
- Azad

== Release ==
Rishta hai pyar ka was released on 6 October 1967 in Pakistani cinemas. In spite of great location and cast, the film failed to become a blockbuster hit. The film completed only 6 weeks on main cinemas and 29 weeks on other cinemas in Karachi and, thus, became a Silver Jubilee film.

== Music ==
The music of the film is composed by the renowned music director Nashad and the songs are written by Fayyaz Hashmi. Playback singers are Ahmed Rushdi, Runa Laila, Masood Rana, Irene Parveen and Muneer Hussein.

=== Discography ===
- "Masoom sa chehra..." by Ahmad Rushdi and Runa Laila
- "Bari mehrbani, bari hi inayat..." by Masood Rana
- "Zalim ne aaj nahin ki..." by Muneer Hussein and Irene Parveen
- "Zakhmay dil chupa kay roain gay..." by Naseem Begum
