= Aaiye =

1949 film

Aeeye
- Directed by: Yakub
- Produced by: Yakub
- Music by: Nashad
- Production company: Indian Productions
- Release date: 1949
- Country: India
- Language: Hindi

Aeeye is an Indian Bollywood social family film. It was released in 1949.

Produced and directed by Yakub under Indian Productions banner, it had music by Nashad. The film had Sulochana Chatterjee, Noor Mohammed Charlie, Masood, Jankidas, Sheela Naik, Ashraf Khan and Yakub starring in it. The film was commercially unsuccessful and Yakub called it the "big mistake" of his life.

== Cast ==
- Yakub
- Sulochana Chatterji
- Noor Mohammed Charlie
- Jankidas
- Masood
- Shantarin
- Ashraf Khan
- Sheela Naik

== Soundtrack ==
The music was composed by Nashad (Shaukat Dehlvi) with lyrics by Nakhshab Jarachvi and S. H. Bihari. The singers were Lata Mangeshkar, Mubarak Begum, G. M. Durrani and Nashad The film was a debut singing venture for Mubarak Begum where Nashad gave her two songs, the solo "Mohe Aane Lagi Angdai", and a duet with Lata Mangeshkar "Aaiye Aao Chalen Chalen Wahan".

=== Song list ===
#	Title	Singer
1	"Aaiye Aao Chalen Chalen Wahan"	Lata Mangeshkar, Mubarak Begum
2	"Mohe Aane Lagi Angdai"	Mubarak Begum
3	"Aa Bhi Ja O Jaane Wale"	Lata Mangeshkar
4	"Jiya Dole Kisi Ke Khayal Mein"	Lata Mangeshkar, Shaukat Dehelvi
5	"Itni Si Kahani Hai"	G. M. Durrani
6	"Kar Sakega Na Juda Tumko"	Lata Mangeshkar, G. M. Durrani
7	"Kis Liye Aankhon Mein Aansoo"	Lata Mangeshkar
8	"Duniya Badal Gayi Ki Muqaddar Bigad Gaya"	Lata Mangeshkar, G. M. Durrani
9	"Jigar Ke Tukde Hain Dil Ke Tukde"	G. M. Durrani
10	"Dil Ki Uljhan Itni Badhi Duniya Mein"	Lata Mangeshkar
