= Hamari Yaad Aayegi =

- Directed by: Kidar Sharma
- Written by: Kidar Sharma
- Produced by: Show People
- Starring: Tanuja; Ashok Sharma; Madhavi; Sujata; Rajinder Dube
- Cinematography: D. C. Mehta
- Edited by: P. A. Gokhale
- Music by: Snehal Bhatkar
- Production company: Show People
- Release date: 1961
- Running time: 130 minutes
- Country: India
- Language: Hindi

Hamari Yaad Aayegi (You Will Remember Me) is a 1961 Hindi romantic drama film, written and directed by Kidar Sharma. Produced under the banner of Show People, the director of photography was D. C. Mehta. The music was composed by Snehal Bhatkar with lyrics by Kidar Sharma. The film had the well-known title song "Kabhi Tanhaiyon Mein Hamari Yaad Aayegi", sung by Mubarak Begum. The film featured the director's son Ashok Sharma in the main role along with Tanuja, Anant Kumar, Madhavi, Sujata and Rajinder Dube.

The film involves a young man Ashok, newly relocated to a city, staying in rented accommodation owned by a young widow. He befriends an orphan girl Manorama and her brother Bulva. The story follows the heartbreak Manorama causes Ashok due to her love for money.

== Plot ==
Ashok (Ashok Sharma) gets a job in Udaipur and finds accommodation at a young widow Hari Devi's (Madhavi) house. Hari Devi had insisted on renting out to married people and Ashok pretends he has a family consisting of a wife and four kids. Seeing how Hari isolates herself with strictness and rigid formality, Ashok tries to draw her out and tells her of his parents and four brothers who were killed in the Partition riots. He also tells her he had lied about his marital status and that he will leave the house. However, the young widow allows him to stay. Ashok is sent on a business trip to a small place thirty miles away. At a fair, he meets the young Manorama, called Mano (Tanuja) and her brother Bulva, who are being chased by the police for stealing trinkets. They tell Ashok that they are orphans who were forced to beg, but now make their earning as singers. Mano adds that though she's poor she's fond of jewellery and fancy clothes. Hari Devi's in-laws send a message asking her to get Ashok to leave as it casts aspersions on the young widow staying alone with a single man. Hari Devi decides to go to her mother-in-law's place in Ajmer instead, in spite of knowing that she will be treated badly there.

Manorama enters Ashok's life again as a thief. He instead employs her to cook for him and stay with the other house help. He also takes on the onus of educating Mano and her brother. Ashok and Mano grow to like each other. When Ashok's boss visits the house, he gets interested in Mano and she goes away with him, attracted by the wealth. Ashok's health deteriorates when he gets pneumonia and Hari Devi comes back to nurse him. On hearing this, an infuriated Mano rushes to the house, but Ashok dies of his illness, leaving Mano desolate.

== Cast ==
- Ashok Sharma as Ashok. In real life, Ashok Sharma is the son of Kidar Sharma.
- Tanuja as Manorama
- Madhvi as Hari Devi
- Anant Kumar
- Rajinder Dube
- Sujata
- Vijay
- Nirwan
- Shanti

== Production and box-office ==
Tanuja had acted in Hamari Beti as a child actress and Chhabili both home productions; produced and directed by her mother Shobhana Samarth. Hamari Yaad Aayegi was Tanuja's debut heroine-centric film as an adult. The film gave her recognition as a "spontaneous actor". However, the film did not do well at the box-office.

== Soundtrack ==
The music was composed by Snehal Bhatkar, who unable to use Lata Mangeshkar's voice as she was 'busy', Bhatkar turned to Mubarak Begum for the famous title song "Hamari Yaad Aayegi", which had lyrics by Kidar Sharma. This song and the music of the film gave lasting recognition to Bhatkar. The playback singing was provided by Mubarak Begum, Lata Mangeshkar, Mohammed Rafi, Suman Kalyanpur and Mukesh.

=== Song list ===
#	Title	Singer	Raga
1	"Kabhi Tanhaiyon Mein Yoon Hamari Yaad Aayegi"	Mubarak Begum	Palasi
2	"Sochata Hoon Ye Kya Kiya Mainne"	Mukesh, Lata Mangeshkar	
3	"Farishton Ki Nagari Mein Main Aa Gaya Hoon Main"	Mukesh	
4	"Ek Chhail Chhabila Chokhra Mane Le Gayo Nadiya Paar"	Suman Kalyanpur, Mohammed Rafi	
5	"Aankhon Me Teri Yaad Liye Ja Raha Hoon Main"	Mukesh	
6	"Jawaan Mohabbat Hasin Aankhon Mein"	Mukesh, Lata Mangeshkar	
7	"Dil Tod Ke Chale Jana Hai Toh"	Suman Kalyanpur	
8	"Kanhaiya Chala Dhor Ban Me Charane"	Mukesh	
9	"Kabhi To Pura Tol Prani"	Mubarak Begum, Suman Kalyanpur	
