= Sohni Mahiwal (1946 film) =

- Directed by: Ishwarla; Ravindra Jaykar
- Based on: Sohni Mahiwal
- Produced by: Jayant Desai Productions
- Starring: Begum Para; Ishwarlal; Mubarak; Dixit
- Music by: Lal Mohammed
- Production company: Jayant Desai Productions
- Release date: 1946
- Running time: 135 min
- Country: India
- Language: Hindi

Sohni Mahiwal is a 1946 Indian Hindi-language romantic drama film directed by Ishwarlal and Ravindra Jaykar and produced in Bombay by Jayant Desai Productions. It is based on the folk story of Sohni Mahiwal. The film starred Begum Para in the lead role as Sohni, along with Ishwarlal, Mubarak, Dixit and Shobha.

== Cast ==
- Begum Para as Sohni
- Ishwarlal
- Mubarak
- Dikshit
- Reva Shankar
- Saeed Ahmed
- Gharpure
- Bibibai
- Shobha
- Nafees Begum
- Kesharbai.

== Soundtrack ==
The music was composed by Lal Mohammad with lyrics by Swami Ramanand and Munshi Dil. The movie is a musical and contains 11 songs, most of which were sung by Zohrabai Ambalewali, who had five solos and three duets with G. M. Durrani. Naseem Akhtar and Reva Shankar sang one song each.

No.	Song title	Singers
1	"Mujhe Loot Liya Re Mujhe"	Naseem Akhtar
2	"Anaaron Ke Baagh Mein Chhup-2 Ke Aana"	Zohra, Chorus
3	"Mohabbat Ke Bande Mohabbat Karenge"	-
4	"Ab To Aaja Jaani Yaar Tera Intezaar Hai"	Zohrabai
5	"Koi Aankhon Mein Aa Ke Sama Gaya"	Zohrabai
6	"Nahin Chiraag-O-Mohabbat Jalaaye Jaate Hain"	Zohrabai
7	"Teri Sohni Pukaar Kare Mahiwal Dekh"	Zohrabai
8	'Chali Pyari Sakhi Sasural Dil Kyon Dole Na"	Zohra, G. M. Durrani
9	"Chenab Ke Behte Hue Paani"	Zohra, G. M. Durrani
10	"Dekh Kar Soorat Tumhari Dil Gaya"	Revashankar, Chorus
11	"Oh Tujh Pe Salaam Ae Mere Nakaam-e-Mohabbat"	Zohra, G. M. Durrani

The lyrics for "Nahin Chiraag" and "Oh tujh Pe Salaam Ae Mere Nakeaam-e-Mohabbat" were written by Munshi Dil. The lyrics of the other songs are by Swami Ramanand.
