= List of songs recorded by Mubarak Begum =

Mubarak Begum is a ghazal singer in Bollywood in the 1950s and 1960s. In her lifetime, she has sung 174 film songs (2 in Bhojpuri) and 13 non-film songs. She died on 18 July 2016 in Mumbai.

== Songs ==
1. "Mohe aane lagi angdai aaja aaja" (aaiye, 1949)
2. "Aao chale sakhi wahan" with Lata Mangeshkar (aaiye, 1949)
3. "Dekho ji baat suno" (Basera, 1950)
4. "Janam janam hum sang rahenge" (Basera, 1950)
5. "Prem kahani chhed jawani"
6. "Shaam hui aur deep jale" with Sulochna Kadam (Basera, 1950)
7. "Maathe pe bindiya kanon men jhumke" (Dolti Naiya, 1950)
8. "Shaam hui aur deep jale" (Dolti Naiya, 1950)
9. "Janam janam ham sang rahenge" (Dolti Naiya, 1950)
10. "Prem kahani chhed jawani" (Dolti Naiya, 1950)
11. "Bach bach ke jawani pagh dhare" (Phoolon Ka Haar, 1951)
12. "Ek do teen chaar paanch che" (Phoolon Ka Haar, 1951)
13. "O zalim bedardi dil men dard tumhare hai" (Phoolon Ka Haar, 1951)
14. "Lapak jhapak aay meethi meethi nindiyan" (Phoolon Ka Haar, 1951)
15. "Jinke preetam sang hai unki diwali hai" (Phoolon Ka Haar, 1951)
16. "Jhoom jhoom kar door gagan with Devendra" (Phoolon ka Haar, 1951)
17. "Mohabbat hote hote ho gayi "with Devendra (Phoolon ka Haar, 1951)
18. "Naam tere bhool jaoon" (Mamta, 1952)
19. "Lekh vidhaata ka likhna" (Mordhawj, 1952)
20. "Gupchup un sang ho gayi ankhian" (Mordhawj, 1952)
21. "Jal jal ke maroon kuch keh na sakoon" (Sheeshaa, 1952)
22. "Tera mera jod nehin hain" (Char Chand, 1953)
23. "Paale soz e gham" (Daaera, 1953)
24. "Deep sang jaloon aaj main" (Daaera, 1953)
25. "Jail jo shama zamane ko ho gaya maloom" (Daaera, 1953)
26. Suno more naina" (Daaera, 1953)
27. Devta tum ho mera" with Mohd Rafi (Daaera, 1953)
28. "Raat kaise kati bata na sake" (Dharma Patni, 1953)
29. "Dil ki duniya pe chha gaya koi" (Africa, 1954)
30. "Lakh lakh taren liye" (Aamir, 1954)
31. "Aaj ghar wale ghar nehin" with Shamshad Begum (Aulaad, 1954)
32. "Aye khuda mazdoor ki fariyaad" (Chandni Chowk, 1954)
33. "Ghir ghir aaye badarva kare" (Dak Babu, 1954)
34. "Nehin achha pyar bhare dil ko satana" (Gawaiya, 1954)
35. "Kaliyon ko choomu main" (Gul Bahar, 1954)
36. "Is haath de us haath le" (Gul Bahar, 1954)
37. "Ho gaya ho gaya unse pyar thoda sa" (Har Jeet, 1954)
38. "Zamane ka gila" with S Balbir (Har Jeet, 1954)
39. "Kya bataen tere dildaar pe" (Maan, 1954)
40. "Kya khabar thi yun tamanna" (Rishta, 1954)
41. "Ek hi rishta maa ka" (Rishta, 1954)
42. "Tera bachpan ek kahani bhool na jana" (Sangam, 1954)
43. "Na manzil hai na" with Asha Bhosle & Talat Mehmood (Tatar ke Chor, 1954)
44. "Dil hamse woh lagaye" with Lata Mangeshkar (Baradari, 1956)
45. "Wo na aayenge palat ke" (Devdas, 1955)
46. "Main hoon nisaar tujhpe dil hai nisaar" (Jasoos, 1955)
47. "Dil toot gaya ulfat ki kasam" (Jasoos, 1955)
48. "Baba ban gaya gentlemen" (Khandan, 1955)
49. "Mera bhola balam dil ki batiyaan" (Kundan, 1955)
50. "Jevan ka too ujiyara hai with Sudha Malhotra (Patit Pawan, 1955)
51. "Dil ko laga ke huzoor tum to" (Rukhsana, 1955)
52. Bhari mehfil men (Rukhsana, 1955)
53. "Kurban ho gaye tujhpe" with Shamshad Begum (Sau Ka Note, 1955)
54. "Sajan ke nainon se" (Sakhi Lutera, 1955)
55. "Aji is fani dunia men mohabbat ke" (Aan Baan, 1956)
56. "Ae ji dekho dekho ji dekho" (Awara Shahzadi, 1956)
57. Dilwalo pyar karlo humse" (Awara Shahzadi, 1956)
58. "Is duniya ka khel" (Badal Aur Bijli, 1956)
59. "Raat kitni haseen hai" with Talat Mehmood (Badal Aur Bijli, 1956)
60. "Kaisa zamana aaya" with Madhubala Jhaveri (Badal Aur Bijli, 1956)
61. "Chand muskuraye sanam" (Baghdad Ka Jadoo, 1956)
62. "Kurban sanam" (Baghdad Ka Jadoo, 1956)
63. "Yeh zindagi ka caravan" with Mohd Rafi (Baghdad Ka Jadoo, 1956)
64. "Yeh mausam suhana rut hai suhana" (Baghi Sardar, 1956)
65. "Ae jaan e wafa nazrein to mila" (Baghi Sardar, 1956)
66. "Leherdaar bichhuade" (Dhola Maru, 1956)
67. "Sawan aaye re" with Lata Mangeshkar (Dhola Maru, 1956)
68. "Aye sakhi chhed zara" (Fighting Queen, 1956)
69. "Nazrein uthao pyar ki" (Fighting Queen, 1956)
70. "Jhanan jhanan payal baaje" with? (Fighting Queen, 1956)
71. "Dekho dekho nihaar ritu aaye" (Harihar Bhakti, 1956)
72. "Meri nazaron ki theeki maar" (Harihar Bhakti, 1956)
73. "Chanda ka rang liye taron ke sang" (Harihar Bhakti, 1956)
74. "Chori chori aayi gori with Sulochna Kadam" (Harihar Bhakti, 1956)
75. "Dil bechara pyar ke maara" (Jungle Queen, 1956)
76. "Chatki hai chandni" (Jungle Queen, 1956)
77. "Dilwalo lo aaye din" (Jungle Queen, 1956)
78. "Dil leke nighahon ka churana" (Lal-E-Yaman, 1956)
79. "Ghoonghat hate ke nazren mile" (Rangeen Raatein, 1956)
80. "Maharaja khivariya khol" (Sultana Daku, 1956)
81. "Tirchhi nazar se hamen na dekho" (Sultana Daku, 1956)
82. "Biduwaash daao more hote" (Fashion, 1957)
83. "Bharat ke log geet" with Sulochna Kadam (Fashion, 1957)
84. "Jalwa jo tera dekha hamne" (Gateway of India, 1957)
85. "Dunia ke diwane kya peer parai jane" (Maharani, 1957)
86. "Jumna nahaao ri sapne men sajan" (Maharani, 1957)
87. "Kamsini mein karti thi lakhon duaen" (Maharani, 1957)
88. "Kya kya khel dikhaye qayamat dhaye" (Patal Pari, 1957)
89. "Khatma bil kar apna ho chukka" (Paisa, 1957)
90. "Ahmed paak jinka naam" (Parvin, 1957)
91. "Mashoor hai rawaayat rehte the peer" (Parvin, 1957)
92. "Ya khuda karim" (Parvin, 1957)
93. "Haay saiyan ne baiyan marod dali" (Chetak Rana Pratap, 1958)
94. "Adaayen teer hain andaz nirale hain" (Jungle Princess, 1958)
95. "Ham haal e dil sunayenghe" (Madhumati, 1958)
96. "Musafir hai hum tum yeh dunia sare" (Sim Sim Marjina, 1958)
97. "Tere sitam ki dastan" (Behram Daku, 1959)
98. "Nazren meri bharpur" with S Balbir (Chini Jadugar, 1959)
99. "Teri chaal pe sanam main" with S Balbir (Chini Jadugar, 1959)
100. "Chala chal musafir" (Maa Ka Ansoo, 1959)
101. "Kaisi been bajai" (Jalim Jadugar, 1960)
102. "Karoon salaam jhuk" with? (Jalim Jadugar, 1960)
103. "Husn ki baraat" with Lata Mangehskar & Shamshad Begum (Mughal e Azam, 1960)
104. "Mohabbat kisko kehte hain" (Return of Mr Superman, 1960)
105. "Piye ja piya ja piye ja" (Veer Durghadas, 1960)
106. "Shama gul karke na jao yun" (Arab Ka Sitara, 1961)
107. "Salam tujhpe" with Minoo Purshottam (Arab Ka Sitara, 1961)
108. "yeh ye yaah rakhna sanam" (Daku Mansoor, 1961)
109. "Raja se bikhari tak" with S Balbir (Dekhi Teri Bombay, 1961)
110. "Jhumo mastiyaon men gawo" (Gypsy Girl, 1961)
111. "Kabhi tanhaiyion men yun hamari yaad" (Hamari Yaad Aayegi, 1961)
112. "Gham chhodo yeh zare zamane ka" (Piya Milan Ki Aas, 1961)
113. "Aisa chalu jadu dil par rahe na kabu" (Shahi Farman, 1961)
114. "Kaliyon ne suna" with Seeta Agarwal (Shahi Farman, 1961)
115. "Phool bagiya men bhanvre aaye" (Zindagi Aur Khwab, 1961)
116. "Nighahon se dil ka salaam aa raha hai" (Cobra Girl, 1963)
117. "Mujhko apne gale lagalo" with Mohd Rafi (Humrahi, 1963)
118. "Wafaon ka alam mitne laga" (Sunehri Nagin, 1963)
119. "Main to ho gai re badnaam" (Sunehri Nagin, 1963)
120. "Hamen dam daike" with Asha Bhosle (Yeh Dil Kisko Doon, 1963)
121. "Chand gagan men ek hai chamka" (Aandhi aur Toofan, 1964)
122. "Payaliya chhankat" (Balma Bada Nadan, 1964) [Bhojpuri]
123. "Bharat ke naujawanon bharat ke kaam aao" (Fariyaad, 1964)
124. "Delhi se do bahane aai" (Fariyad, 1964)
125. "Tune teri nazar ne to kafir bana diya" (Fariyad, 1964)
126. "Nighahon se dil men chale aaiyega" (Hameer Hath, 1964)
127. "Aail barkha bahar" (Kab Hum Ho Hain Gawana Hamaar, 1964)
128. Sautan jin laiha (Kub hum Ho Hain Gawana Hamaar, 1964)
129. Husnwalon se na milna ye daga dete hai" (Magic Carpet, 1964)
130. "Ankhon ankhon har ek raat guzar jati hai" (Marvel Man, 1964)
131. "Chadela asaadha bharela sab nindiya" (Nihar Chutal Jai, 1964) [Bhojpuri]
132. "Dil ki na jane anari balma" (Pahadi Nagin, 1964)
133. "Gore gore mukhde pe teel kala" with Ambar Kumar (Pahadi Nagin, 1964)
134. "Chah karni thi chah kar bhaite" with Asha Bhosle (Punar Milan, 1964)
135. "Kuchh ajnabi si aap hain" (Shagun, 1964)
136. "Itni bi kareeb aake bhi kya" with Talat Mehmood (Shagun, 1964)
137. "Aise hum barbaad hue koi sahara na" (Tarzan and Captain Kishore, 1964)
138. "Pyar ki raat aur yeh tanhai" (Tarzan and Captain Kishore, 1964)
139. "Aye jane nazar chilman se agar" (Qawwali Ki Raat, 1964)
140. "Dekh kar meri taraf khamosh ho jana" (Qawwali Ki Raat, 1964)
141. "Jab ishq kahin ho jata" with Asha Bhosle (Qawwali Ki Raat, 1964)
142. "Nazar aate ho tum" (Black Arrow, 1965)
143. "Ae dil bata hum kahan aa gaye" (Khooni Khazana, 1965)
144. "Abhi abhi nazar mili" (Main Hoon Jadugar, 1965)
145. "Dekha jo hamne aap ko armaan machal gaye" (Main Hoon Jadugar, 1965)
146. "Mehfil men aap" with Suman Kalyanpur & Jagjit Kaur (Mohabbat Isko Kehte Hain, 1965)
147. "Mere aansuon pe na muskura" (More Man Mitwa, 1965)
148. "Haseenon ke dhoke men aana na aye dil" (Tarzan and King Kong, 1965)
149. "Pyar kare pyar kare jise chahe" (Gagola, 1966)
150. "Zara kehdo fizaon se hamen" (Gagola, 1966)
151. "Saqiya ek jaam" with Asha Bhosle (Neend Humare Khwab Tumhare, 1966)
152. "Khub ba khud ishq ka izhaar hua jaata hai" (Professor Aur Jadugar, 1966)
153. "Bemuravat bewafa begane dil aap hai" (Sushila, 1966)
154. "Main sunati hoon ek majra" with Shankar Shambhu (Teesri Kasam, 1966)
155. Ae dil tere muqaddar ka aaj faisla hoga (Zimbo fins a son, 1966)
156. "Hum to dil bechte hain" (Mera Bhai Mera Dushman, 1967)
157. Humne tumhen sikhlaye with Amar & Bhooshan (Mera Bhai Mera Dushman, 1967)
158. "Manwa nehin meet" (Awara Ladki, 1967)
159. "Yeh moonh aur masoor ki daal" with Sharda (Around The World, 1967)
160. "Kaise zulmi se naina hamara laga" (Poonam Ki Chand, 1967)
161. Neend ud jaye" with Suman Kalyanpur & Krishna Bose (Juari, 1968)
162. "Wada hamse kiya dil kisi ko diya" (Saraswatichandra, 1968)
163. "Matwaare sanwariya ke naina" (Hum Ek Hain, 1969)
164. "Suno haal meri zindagi ka" (Chandan, 1971)
165. "Huns ko kar be naqab kar raha sab ko salaam" (Chandan, 1971)
166. "Balma tu har wade par karta hai" (Chattan Singh, 1974)
167. "Dard e dil dard e wafa dard e tamanna kya hai" (Subah Zaroor Aayegi, 1977)
168. "Aao tumhe pyar karoon" (Ramu Toh Deewana Hain, 1980)
169. "Sanwariya teri yaad men ro ro marenge hum" (Ramu Toh Deewana Hain, 1980)
170. "Zindagi ham tere had se guzar gaye" (Sister, 1980)
171. "Hamen mitane aaya jo" - with Shamshad Begum (Ganga Mang Rahi Balidan, 1981)
172. Karlo jitna sitam kar - with Shamshad Begum (Ganga Mang Rahi Balidan, 1981)
173. "Ho sanam tere liye" with Shamshad Begum (Ganga Mang Rahi Balidan, 1981)
174. "Pahenke main nau gai ki men sadi" (Nai Imarat, 1981)
