= Khumar Barabankvi =

Indian Urdu poet and lyricist (1919–1999)

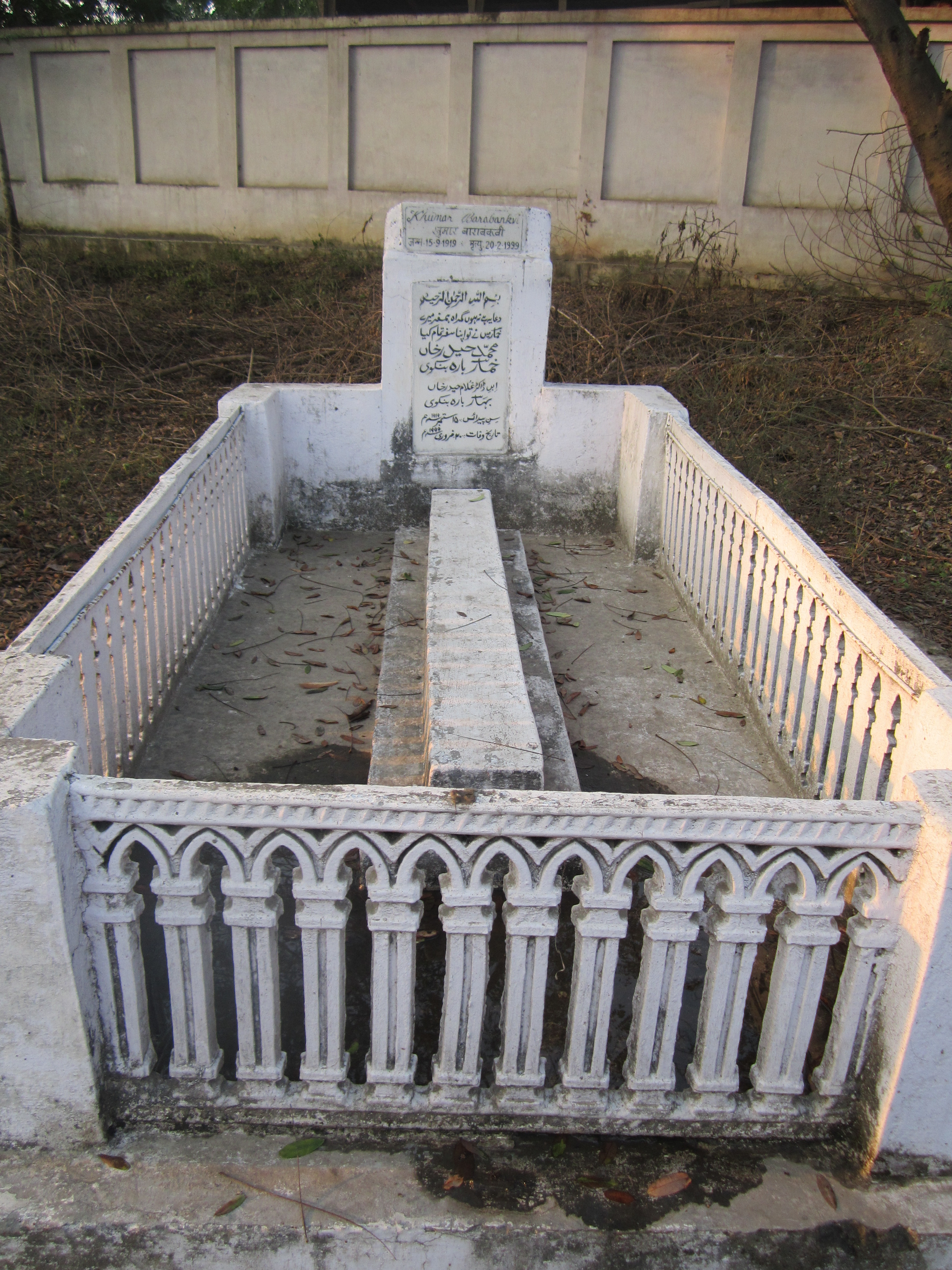
Grave of Khumar Barabankvi, Karbala Civil Lines, Lucknow-Faizabad Road, Barabanki city

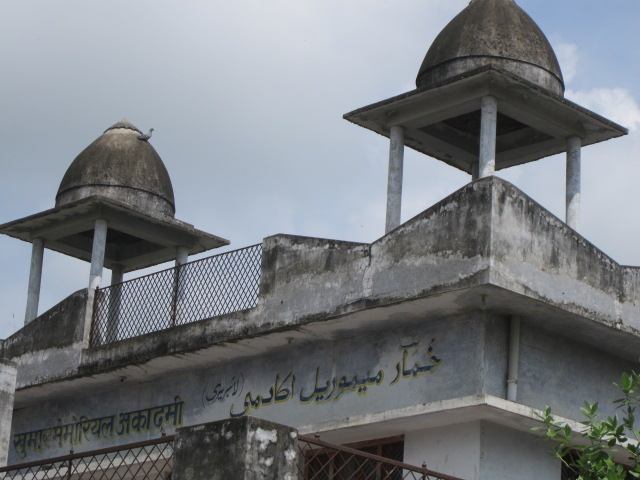
Khumar Memorial Academy (Library), K.D.Singh Babu Marg, Barabanki

Mohammed Haider Khan (15 September 1919 – 19 February 1999), better known by his takhallus (pen name/ nom de plume) Khumār Barabankvi was an Urdu poet and Hindi film lyricist from Barabanki, Uttar Pradesh, India.

The word Khumar comes from the Arabic root Khum which means a jar of wine/intoxication. His ghazals are sung by many famous singers such as Mehdi Hassan, Ghulam Ali, K. L. Saigal, Talat Mahmood, Mohammed Rafi, Lata Mangeshkar, Asha Bhosle, Jagjit Singh and many other singers.

== Early life ==
Khumar Barabankvi was born on 15 September 1919 in Barabanki, Uttar Pradesh. He found poetic environment in his family during his childhood. His father, Dr. Ghulam Haider, wrote salaams and marsiyas under pen name ‘Bahar’. His uncle Qaraar Barabnkvi was a well-known poet of Barabanki who guided Khumar in his young age and did Islah (corrections) to his poetry. His brother Kazim Haider ‘Nigar’, who died in early age, was also a poet. Khumar completed his high school from Government College, Barabanki. He then moved to Lucknow for his Intermediate classes where a romantic turn in his life made him quit education and start writing poetry of love.

Khumar Barabankvi had a melodious voice and soon became popular in Mushairas (poetry reading live events). He also became acquainted with the poet Jigar Moradabadi and remained in association with him for a long period. His ghazals and voice made him a favorite in Mushairas. Jigar Muradabadi and Khumar Barabankvi were known to guarantee for the success of any mushaira with their poetry as well as their melodious voice and style of recitation. Khumar was an ardent supporter of classical ghazal like Jigar Moradabadi.

Khumar has written some famous songs for Hindi films such as Shahjehan (1946 film), Bara Dari (1955), 'Saaz aur Awaaz', and Love And God (1986) directed by K. Asif. He collaborated with noted composers like Naushad and Nashad among others. He wrote all the songs for the film 'Saaz Aur Awaaz' produced by Naushad in 1966 and wrote some songs again for the film Love and God (1986 film) for which Naushad again composed music.

== Death ==
Khumār Barabankvi died on 19 February 1999 at the age of 80.

== Published work ==
He had his work published as:

- 'Hadees-e-Deegaraan'
- 'Aatish-e-Tar'
- 'Raqs-e-Mai'
- "Shab-e- Tab"
- Aahang e Khumar (1995)

== Filmography as a Hindi film lyricist ==
Year	Film	Songs written	Music Director	Notes
1946	Shahjehan	3	Naushad Ali	Debut film
1946	Devar	At least 1	Gulshan Sufi	
1947	Andhoki Duniya	At least 1	Vasant Desai	
1947	Matwala Shair Ramjoshi	At least 1	Vasant Desai	
1947	Natak	5	Naushad Ali	
1949	Dil Ki Basti	1	Ghulam Mohammed	
1949	Rooplekha	4	Khan Mastana and Sajjad Hussain (separately)	
1950	Aadhi Raat	1	Husnlal-Bhagatram	
1950	Meherbani	3	Khan Mastana	
1951	Bikhre Moti	2	Ghulam Mohammed	
1951	Hulchul	10 (All)	Sajjad Hussain and Mohammed Shafi Niyazi (separately)	
1954	Darwaza	3	Nashad	
1955	Bara Dari	10 (All)	Nashad	
1955	Rukhsana	6	Sajjad Hussain	
1955	Shahzada	3	Nashad	
1956	Jallad	2	Nashad	
1956	Jawab	9 (All)	Nashad	
1956	Lal-e-Yaman	3	Allah Rakha Qureshi	
1957	Captain Kishore	2	Chitragupta Srivastava	
1957	Do Roti	8 (All)	Roshan Lal Nagrath	
1957	Mehfil	5	Nashad	
1958	Mehndi	5	Ravi Shankar Sharma	
1959	Zara Bachke	2	Nashad	
1960	Qatil	1	Nashad	
1966	Saaz Aur Awaaz	9 (All)	Naushad Ali	
1986	Love and God	9	Naushad Ali	
