= Barada (disambiguation) =

The Barada is the main river that flows through Damascus, the capital of Syria.

Barada may also mean:

- Barada, a brand of beer brewed in Damascus – see Beer in Syria
- Barada, Nebraska. a village in the US State of Nebraska
- Barada TV, a London-based Syrian opposition satellite television station
- Baradha people, an Aboriginal Australian people of Queensland, also spelt Barada
- Berdan River, a river in Turkey, also spelt "Baradā"

== See also ==
- Klaatu barada nikto, a phrase from the 1951 science fiction film The Day the Earth Stood Still
