= Nashad =

Indian/Pakistani film musician

Nashad ناشاد
- Born: Shaukat Ali Hashmi; 11 July 1923; Delhi, British India
- Died: 3 January 1981 (aged 57)
- Occupations: Film Composer, film music director
- Years active: 1947–1981
- Relatives: Wajid Nashad (son) (also a music director)
- Awards: 2 Nigar Awards in 1964 and 1969

Nashad (Urdu: ناشاد; 11 July 1923 – 14 January 1981) was a film composer and music director of Indian and Pakistani film industry. He composed music for Hindi films in the 1940s and 1950s, credited on-screen under the names Nashad and then later migrated to Pakistan in 1964.

== Early life and career ==
Shaukat Ali Hashmi was born in Delhi, British India, on 11 July 1923. He received his early academic education at a local high school in Delhi. His father, Ghulam Hussain Khan, was a tabla player. So Shaukat Ali Nashad and his father first worked with the music composer Ghulam Haider. He also learned to play the flute. Then he moved to Bombay in the early 1940s. He composed using several names before finally settling for Nashad. Film director Nakshab Jarchavi changed Shaukat Ali's name to Nashad for his film Naghma (1953). He made his music debut under the name Shaukat Dehalvi in the 1947 action film Dildaar. The director was Shiv Raj, and it had lyrics by C.M. Muneer. The cast consisted of Sagina, Yashonat, Dev Radha and Deepak.

He composed as Shaukat Ali for the 1948 film Jeene Do. Made under the banner of J. Hind Chitra, its directors were A. F. Keeka and K. A. Majeed, and the cast included Monica Devi, Panalal, Harish, Ratan Piya, Laila Gupta and Shanta Kanwar. He used his real name Shaukat Ali to compose for the 1948 film Payal.

In 1948, he also composed songs for film Toote Taare (1948) as Shaukat Dehalvi. Released under the banner of Sheikh Mukhtar's film production unit called "Omar Khayyam films", the director was Harish, and the cast included Shamim Banu and Motilal. In this film, he composed Mughal Emperor Bahadur Shah Zafar's famous ghazal "Na Kisi Ki Aankh Ka Noor Hoon" which became very popular throughout India and Pakistan. In 1949, he composed music for actor-director Yakub's film, Aiye. The film starred Yaqub and Sulochna Chatterji.

In 1949, Nashad using the name Shaukat Ali Haideri composed songs for the film "Dada". The director was Harish, and it was released under the banner of "Omar Khayyam films", the cast included Sheikh Mukhtar, Begum Para, Munawwar Sultana, Shyam, Murad, Mukri, and Gullu. It was released in Jubilee cinema, Karachi. He was also known as Shaukat Dehalvi for some time.

== Difference between Nashad and Naushad ==
In 1953, film director, Nakshab Jarachavi, had Shaukat Ali change his name to Nashad, which he retained for the rest of his life. The story behind the name change has been written in the book "Naushad: Zarra Jo Aaftaab Bana" (Penguin). The film director initially approached Naushad Ali for composing the music for his film. When Naushad Ali refused, the irate director Nakshab Jarchavi then had Shaukat Ali change his name to Nashad, to make it sound like Naushad. Nashad then composed for Jarchavi's 1953 film Naghma, starring Nadira and Ashok Kumar.

== Interview from 1955 ==
In August 1955, Nashad talked at length in an interview as to how composing film songs for Indian Film Industry was done back in those days. He said that when he was hired as a film music composer, his 'first job' usually was to sit with the film director and determine the musical situations in the upcoming film. After these discussions and back-and-forth suggestions, he would start composing the melodies to match with the mood of those situations in the film. Once the tune of the film song is agreed upon, then the lyricist writes the words of the approved tune.

In this interview, Nashad described just one method of composing film melodies. People in the film industry sometimes use the opposite method of composing film songs – for example in Pakistan, the eminent poet Faiz Ahmed Faiz had written his famous nazm, Mujh Se Pehli Si Mohabbat Mere Mehboob Na Maang where it would later be used in a 1962 Pakistani film Qaidi without their knowledge and then would go on to become hugely popular among the public. The music director Rasheed Attre, his son Wajahat Attre and the singer Noor Jehan came up with the final song composition (per Wajahat Attre's interview years later).

== Later career ==
Nashad wrote and composed the song "Mohabbat Zindagi Hai" for the Pakistani film Tum Salamat Raho (1974). It had two versions included in the movie, a male version by ghazal singer, Mehdi Hassan, and female version by Noor Jehan. Lyrics were penned by Masroor Anwar. The two songs were accompanies by music videos, both picturised on Waheed Murad & Asiya. The male version was shot in a garden and was featured first in the film. It begins with Asiya accepting her love for Waheed and Waheed promising not to deceive her love. Then Waheed sings the song whilst romancing Asiya. It ends with them walking away united. The female version was featured later in the movie and was shot in a mountain valley. It begins with Asiya promising to Waheed that she will marry only him and she is only his. Then she sings the song whilst romancing Waheed. It ends with Mohammad Ali catching them red-handed, romancing. The song, especially the male version, became a rage and is recognised as a classic today. It is also considered one of the best songs sung by Mehdi Hassan.

== Filmography ==
=== In India ===
Nashad's films in India include:

- Dildaar (1947)
- Toote Taare (1948)
- Suhagi (1948)
- Jeene Do (1948)
- Dada (1949)
- Aiye (1949)
- Ram Bharose (1951)
- Gazab (1951)
- Naghma (1953)
- Char Chand (1953) cast: Shyama and Suresh
- Darwaza (1954) director: Shahid Lateef, husband of writer Ismat Chughtai, cast: Shyama, Chandrashekhar. He introduced singer Suman Kalyanpur for the first time in this film.
- Shahzada (1955)
- Subse Bada Rupaiya (1955) director: P. L. Santoshi, cast: Shashikala and Agha, music: Nashad and O. P. Nayyar.
- Shehzada (1955), director: Mohan Sinha, cast: Sheela Ramani and Ajit, music: Nashad and S. Mohinder
- Jawab (1955),
- Bara Dari (1955) director: K. Amarnath, lyrics: Khumar Barabanki, cast: Geeta Bali, Ajith, Chandrashekhar and Pran. This film had some hit songs "Bhula Nahin Dena Ji Bhula Nahin Dena, Zamana Kharab Hai, Bhula Nahin Dena" by Lata Mangeshkar and Mohammed Rafi, and "Tasveer Banata Hoon Tasveer Nahin Banti" by Talat Mehmood. Nashad himself sang a song in this film.
- Awara Shehzadi, Director, Pyarelal, cast: Meena Shori and Diljeet, music: Nashad and Jimmi.
- Jallad (1956) cast: Veena, Munawwar Sultana and Nasir Khan.
- Bada Bhai (1957) cast: Kamini Kaushal and Ajit.
- Zindagi Ya Toofan (1958) cast: Nutan and Pradeep Kumar
- Mehfil cast: Rehana and Diljeet.
- Hathkari (1958) cast: Shakila and Moti Lal.
- Zara Bachh Ke (1958) cast: Nanda and Suresh.
- Qatil (1960) cast: Chitra and Prem Nath.
- Flight To Assam (1961) cast: Shakila and Ranjan.
- Pyar Ki Dastaan (1961) cast: Anita Guha and Suresh Kumar
- Rooplekha (1962) cast: Wajeeh Chaudhari and Mahipal.
- Maya Mahal (1963) cast: Helen and Mahipal
- Main Hoon Jadugar (1965)
- Flying man (1965) Nashad's last film in India as a music composer

=== In Pakistan ===
He migrated to Pakistan and debuted as a composer in the 1964 film Maikhana, directed by Nakhshab Jarachavi, its scriptwriter was Agha Nasir. Nashad had worked with Master Ghulam Haider, Nisar Bazmi, Naushad early in his film career as their assistant to learn from them. He is given credit for first introducing Runa Laila to the Pakistani film industry from Karachi.

=== Popular songs ===
Some of the songs he composed, as an independent music director, are listed below:

- Jaan Keh Kar Jo Bulaaya Tau Bura Maan Gaye sung by Saleem Raza from the 1964 film Maikhana
- "Phir Subah Hogi" sung by Masood Rana from the 1966 film Phir Subah Hogi
- "Pyar Hota Nahi Zindagi Ke" sung by Runa Laila from the 1966 film Phir Subah Hogi
- "Daiya Re Daiya Re Kaanta Chubhah" a duet by Runa Laila and Masood Rana from the 1966 film Phir Subah Hogi
- "Chali Ho Chali Ho Tum Kahan Dilruba" a duet by Runa Laila and Ahmed Rushdi from the 1966 film Hum Dono
- "Unki Nazron Se Muhabbat Ka Jo Paigham Mila" sung by Runa Laila from the 1966 film Hum Dono
- "Marna Bhi Nahi Aata" sung by Runa Laila from the 1966 film Hum Dono
- "Masoom Sa Chehra Hai Hum Jis Kay Hain Deewane" Singers Ahmed Rushdi & Runa Laila.
- "Zakhm-e-dil Chhupa Ke Royein Ge, Tujh Ko Aazma Kay Royein Ge". Singer, Naseem Begum, the film Rishta hai pyar ka (1967)
- "Bari Meherbani, Bari Hai Inayat" Singer Masood Rana, film Rishta hai pyar ka (1967)
- "Lay Aayee Phir Kahan Per Qismat Hamay Kahan Se." Singer Noor Jehan, director Qamar Zaidi's film Salgira (1969)
- "Lazzat-e-souz-e-jigar Pooch Lay Parwane Se" Duet by Ahmed Rushdi and Runa Laila, music by Nashad, film Salgira (1969)
- "Tere Wade Se Meri Zindagi Saji" Duet, Ahmed Rushdi – Irene Perveen
- "Gori Ke Sar pe Saj Ke, Sehray Ke Phool Kahenge" Singer, Ahmed Rushdi. Director Iqbal Yusuf's 1969 film Tum Mile Pyar Mila (1969)
- "Aap Ko Bhool Jaayein Hum Itne Toh Bewafa Naheen" Singers Mehdi Hassan & Noor Jehan, film Tum mile pyar mila (1969)
- "Mujhe kar dain na deewana tere andaz mastana" Sung by Mehdi Hassan, lyrics by Taslim Fazli, film "Naya Raasta (1973)"
- "Aisa pyaar karne wala meri jaan tujhe dhoonde na mile ga" Sung by Mehdi Hassan, lyrics by Masroor Anwar, film "Milan" (1978)
- Woh kehtay thay hum se mulaqaat karo Sung by Afshan, lyrics by Taslim Fazli, Film Naya Rasta (1973)
- Zindagi Mein Tau Sabhi Pyar Kiya Karte Hain Sung by Mehdi Hassan, lyrics by Qateel Shifai, Film Azmat (1973)

== Personal life ==
He married an Indian Muslim woman when he was living there. He had eight sons and seven daughters. His oldest son, Wajid Ali Nashad, was a music composer in Pakistan who died in 2008. His son Shahid Ali Nashad is a composer. Akbar Ali Nashad is also a composer and arranger. His other son, Imran Ali Nashad is a singer. Arshad Ali Nashad moved to the United States. Ahmad Ali Nashad is a cricketer. Ajmal Ali Nashad is a 'supervisor' in some company. Singer Ameer Ali (Choorian 1998 Film Fame) is also a son of Shaukat Ali Nashad. He is a film playback singer. He has performed in many live shows on stage also. Lately, Ameer Ali Nashad has made his own Audio Studio. His super-hit film song is 'Karan Mein Nazara Jadon Ohdi Tasweer Da' in film Choorian (1998 film).

== Notable films ==
- Naghma (1953)
- Bara Dari (1955)
- Zindagi Ya Toofan (1958)
- Maikhana (1964)
- Phir Subah Hogi (1966)
- Hum Dono (1966)
- Rishta Hai Pyar Ka (1967)
- Tum Mile Pyar Mila (1969)
- Salgira (1969)
- Chand Suraj (1970)
- Sapera (1970)
- Afshan (1971)
- Rim Jhim (1971)
- Baharo Phool Barsao (1972)
- Ek Raat (1972)
- Azmat (1973)
- Insaan aur Gadha (1973)
- Naya Rasta (1973)
- Deedar (1974)
- Zeenat (1975)
- Palki (1975)
- Milan (1978)

== Awards and recognition ==
- Nigar Award for Best Music Composer in Maikhana (1964 film)
- Nigar Award for Best Music Composer in Salgira (1969 film)

== Death ==
Nashad died on 3 January 1981 at age 57. He composed film music for over 60 films during his career. Among his survivors were eight sons and seven daughters. Many of his sons followed him into the music industry.
