= Bara Dari (1955 film) =

1955 film from India

- Directed by: K. Amarnath
- Produced by: K. Amarnath
- Starring: Geeta Bali; Ajit; Pran; Minoo Mumtaz
- Music by: Nashad
- Release date: 1955
- Country: India
- Languages: Urdu and Hindi

Bara Dari is a 1955 'musical romance' film from India.

== Cast ==
- Geeta Bali
- Ajit
- Pran
- Chandrashekhar
- Gope
- Murad
- Cuckoo
- Minu Mumtaz
- Sapru
- Tiwari

== Reception ==
According to Boxofficeindia.com website, this film ranked (#9 out of 10) among the 'Top Earners of 1955' and was called a "semi-hit" by the website.

== Tracks ==
All music is composed by Shaukat Dehlvi Nashad and film song lyrics are by Khumar Barabankvi.

| Song title | Sung by | Lyrics by | Music by | Film notes |
|---|---|---|---|---|
| Tasveer Banata Hoon, Tasveer Nahin Banti | Talat Mahmood | Khumar Barabankvi | Nashad | |
| Bhula Nahin Dena Ji Bhula Nahin Dena | Lata Mangeshkar and Mohammed Rafi | Khumar Barabankvi | Nashad | |
| Chhayi Re Badariya, Abke Baras Bada Zulm Hua | Lata Mangeshkar | Khumar Barabankvi | Nashad | |
| Mohabbat Ki Bus Itni Dastaan Hai, Baharein Char Din Ki Phir Khazaan Hai | Lata Mangeshkar and Mohammed Rafi | Khumar Barabankvi | Nashad | Bara Dari (1955) was an 'semi-hit film' at the box office but its songs and music became highly popular in 1955 |
| Chhodo Chhodo Ji Baiyyan Mori, Mein Nazuk Chhori | Lata Mangeshkar and Shamshad Begum | Khumar Barabankvi | Nashad | |
| Dil Humse Woh Lagaye Jo Hanske Teer Khaaye | Lata Mangeshkar and Shamshad Begum | Khumar Barabankvi | Nashad | A popular qawwali song from this film |
| Kho Diya Meine Paa Kar Kisi Ko, Aag Lag Jaaye Iss Zindagi Ko | Lata Mangeshkar | Khumar Barabankvi | Nashad | |
