= Nazim Panipati =

Pakistani poet and film songs lyricist (1920 - 1998)

- Born: Nazim; 1920; Lahore, Punjab, British India
- Died: 18 June 1998 (aged 77–78); Lahore, Punjab, Pakistan
- Occupations: Poet, film songwriter
- Known for: Introducing several stars to the Indian Film Industry
- Relatives: Veteran film producer/director Walli Sahib (brother)

Nazim Panipati (1920 – 18 June 1998) was a film song lyricist and film script writer in the Indian and Pakistani film industries during the 1940s and 1950s.

== Early life ==
Nazim was born in 1920 in Lahore. He was a brother of filmmaker Mohammad Wali (better known as Wali Sahib) in India and Pakistan.

== New talent introductions ==
Nazim Panipati wrote more than two hundred songs for Hindi, Urdu and Punjabi language films. The first song of Indian singer Lata Mangeshkar's career, 'Dil Mera Tora, Mujhe Kahin Ka Na Chora, Tere Pyar Ne', music by Ghulam Haider for the film Majboor (1948), was also written by Panipati. This song became popular throughout India. At that time, Master Ghulam Haider had told Nazim Panipati that this unknown girl (Lata Mangeshkar) was destined to become a great singer of India after Noor Jehan.

In 1939, Nazim Panipati and his film producer/director brother Walli Sahib first persuaded Pran to become a film actor in Lahore, due to his good looks, after Wali Sahib spotted him at Lakshmi Chowk, Lahore at a Paan Shop. Pran was reluctant and disbelieving, at first, at the offer. Pran (birth name was Pran Krishan Sikand, born in Delhi in a Hindu Punjabi family) could not speak proper Punjabi language at that time because he was raised in Delhi where his father worked. Wali Sahib was offering him to act in a Punjabi film Yamla Jat (1940). So Pran's Punjabi-language skills were polished up by Wali Sahib's songwriter brother Nazim Panipati. Pran later went on to become a big film star.

Nazim Panipati also introduced actress Vyjayanthimala (she was from South India, Nazim Panipati taught her Urdu language for films). In addition to them, he also introduced comedian Johnny Walker and Helen to the Indian Film Industry.

== Career in Pakistan ==
In 1953, Nazim Panipati migrated to Pakistan. Film Guddi Gudda (1956) was his first Pakistani film which was produced and directed by his brother Wali Sahib. Famous Pakistani film playback singer Saleem Raza and Nazim Panipati also had both worked together at an advertising agency in Lahore for some time. In the mid 1960s, he joined Pakistan Television Corporation and wrote songs for a musical programme named Jhankar.

== Death ==
Nazim Panipati died on 18 June 1998 in Lahore, Pakistan. He was buried in the Model Town, Lahore graveyard.

== Notable films ==
Nazim Panipati's major films as a songwriter are:

- Yamla Jat (1940) - actor Pran's debut film
- Dulla Bhatti (1940)
- Khazanchi (1941)
- Khandan (1942)
- Mangti (1942)- A Punjabi language film
- Zamindar (1942)
- Naukar (1943 film)
- Poonji (1943)
- Shirin Farhad (1945)
- Doli (1947)
- Majboor (1948)
- Roomal (1949)
- Sheesh Mahal (1950)
- Zamane Ki Hawa (1952)
- Danka (1954)
- Lakht-E-Jigar (1956)- A Pakistani film
- Guddi Gudda (1956) - A Pakistani film in the Punjabi language
- Aaina (1966 film)
- Insaniyat (1967 film)

== Notable songs ==
Popular songs of Nazim Panipati as a lyricist:

- Aai Hai Diiwaalii Sakhi Aai Sakhi Aai Re- film Sheesh Mahal (1950) music : Vasant Desai
- Dil Mera Tora, Mujhe Kahin Ka Na Chora Tere Pyar Ne- film Majboor (1948) music by Ghulam Haider
- Dilli Ki Galiyon Mein- film Doli (1947) music by Ghulam Mohammad
- Ham Hain Dukhiya Is Duniya Mein... Koi Jaage Koi Soey- film Jag Biti (1946) music by Ghulam Haider
- Merii Mitti Ki Duniya Nirali- film Sham Savera (1946) music by Amar Nath (aka Pandit Amarnath)
- Suno Suno Kaise Kah Doon Bajariyaa Ke Beech- film Ladli (1949) music by Anil Biswas
- Wo Akhiyan Mila Kar Chale Gaye- film Roomal (1949) music by Hansraj Behl
- Aahen Tadap Rahi Hain, Haath Badhaae Chand Ko- film Lakht-e-Jigar (1956) music by Ghulam Ahmed Chishti
- Chanda Ki Nagri Se Aaja Ri Nindiya- a popular 'lori' song from film Lakht-e-Jigar (1956) music by Ghulam Ahmed Chishti
