= Stage (film) =

- Poster
- Directed by: Vijay Mhatre
- Starring: Dev Anand; Ramola Devi
- Release date: 1951
- Country: India
- Language: Hindi

Stage is a 1951 Bollywood film starring Dev Anand and Ramola Devi in lead roles.

== Music ==
1. "Dil Leke Dil Diya Hai, Ehsaan Kya Kiya Hai" - Mohammed Rafi, Lata Mangeshkar
2. "Kisi Se Pyar Karna Zindagi Barbaad Karna Hai" - Lata Mangeshkar
3. "Sach Kahan Hai Kisine Bach Ke Chalna" - Lata Mangeshkar, Sonik
4. "O Jaanewale, Dil Mein Teri Yaad Reh Gayi" - Geeta Dutt
5. "Jagmagaati Diwali Ki Raat Aa Gayi (Part-1)" - Asha Bhosle
6. "Jagmagaati Diwali Ki Raat Aa Gayi (Part-2)" - Asha Bhosle
7. "Dil Machalne Laga Jaag Uthi Dhadkanen" - Asha Bhosle
8. "Kisi Ke Ghar Mein To Ghee Ke Chirag" - Asha Bhosle
9. "Jisko Naa Lagi Ho Chot Kabhi" - Asha Bhosle
10. "Ummeeden Toot Gayi Apni, Tadapti Hai Tamannayen" - Asha Bhosle
