= Hum Bhi Insaan Hain =

Hum Bhi Insaan Hain (lit. 'We Are Humans Too') may refer to these Indian Hindi (Bollywood) films:

- Hum Bhi Insan Hain, 1948 film
- Hum Bhi Insaan Hain (1959 film), see list of Hindi films of 1959
- Hum Bhi Insaan Hain (1989 film)
