= Babul (1950 film) =

1950 film

- Directed by: S. U. Sunny
- Written by: Azmi Bazidpuri
- Produced by: Naushad
- Starring: Dilip Kumar; Nargis; Munawar Sultana
- Cinematography: Fali Mistry
- Edited by: Moosa Mansoor
- Music by: Naushad
- Release date: 15 December 1950
- Running time: 142 minutes
- Country: India
- Language: Hindi

Babul (English: Father's House) is a 1950 Bollywood musical drama film directed by S.U. Sunny, produced and with music direction by Naushad. The film stars Dilip Kumar, Nargis, Munawar Sultana in pivotal roles. A box office success, the film became the 2nd highest earning film of 1950, earning an approximate gross of Rs. 12,500,000 and a net of Rs. 70,00,000.

== Plot ==
Ashok hails from a wealthy family and has a job as a postmaster, but it is clear that his job requires little hard labor, aside from sending an occasional telegram, leaving him time to enjoy his comforts – cigarettes, painting and song writing. A girl named Bela, the poor and simple daughter of the former postmaster strives for his affections and is supported by her poor father who wants her married. Bela prepares Ashok's meals, teases and amuses him, and imagines a happy marriage with Ashok, who likes her but is not in love with her.

Bela has competition from the wealthy landowner Jamnadas's daughter Usha, who lives a lavish lifestyle in a hilltop mansion. Usha, drives a foreign car and seems more suitable for Ashok, the young postmaster. Bela, heartbroken, in a fit of jealousy lies to Usha that Ashok has confessed his love for her and is playing a double game.

Bela witnesses Usha's wedding while sitting in a tree, believing that shortly afterwards she would be married off to Ashok. But the tree branch that she is sitting on breaks and she falls to the ground, severely injured. As she is brought back to her father's home in this condition, Ashok arrives and promises her father he would marry Bela. As Ashok sits on Bela's bedside to comfort her, Bela dreams again that the black-veiled rider has come to get her and dies.

== Cast ==
- Dilip Kumar as Ashok
- Nargis as Bela
- Munawar Sultana as Usha
- Amar as Usha's Father
- Jankidas as Ashok's Father
- Jugnu as Munshi
- Khursheed as Munshi's Wife
- Uma Devi as Tun Tun (Munshi's Daughter)

== Music ==
Babul

Soundtrack album by Naushad
- Released: 1950
- Genre: Feature film soundtrack

Naushad chronology
'Dulari' (1949)	Babul (1950)	'Dastan' (1950)

The score and a soundtrack of fifteen songs was composed by Naushad and the lyrics were penned by Shakeel Badayuni. The songs were mostly about the joys and pains of love, and the film is closely connected to the lyrics. The best known song in the film Chod Babul Ka Ghar (literally meaning Now you must leave your father's house), is performed when a newly married girl departs from her maternal home and village. The love song Nadi Kinare (On the bank of a river) is performed by Ashok and Usha and a group of boatmen.

No.	Title	Singer(s)	Length
1.	"Duniya Badal Gayi" (Raga Darbari Kanada)	Shamshad Begum, Talat Mahmood	03:20
2.	"Dhadke Mera Dil"	Shamshad Begum	03:19
3.	"Chhod Babul Ka Ghar (Female)" (Raga Marva)	Shamshad Begum	03:17
4.	"Chhod Babul Ka Ghar (Male)" (Raga Marva)	Talat Mahmood, Mohammed Rafi	03:35
5.	"Kisi Ke Dil Mein Rehna Tha"	Shamshad Begum, Lata Mangeshkar	03:41
6.	"Lagan More Man Ki"	Lata Mangeshkar, Munawar Sultana	03:13
7.	"Mera Jeevan Saathi Bichhad Gaya"	Talat Mahmood	03:25
8.	"Milte Hi Ankhen Dil Hua Diwana Kisi Ka"	Shamshad Begum, Talat Mahmood	02:55
9.	"Pancchi Ban Mein"	Lata Mangeshkar	03:03
10.	"Husn Walon Ko Na Dil Do"	Talat Mahmood	03:31
11.	"Jadoo Bhare Nainon Mein"	Shamshad Begum, Dilip Kumar	03:29
12.	"Nadi Kinare Saath Hamare"	Shamshad Begum, Talat Mahmood, Mohammed Rafi	03:17
13.	"Na Socha Tha Yeh"	Shamshad Begum	03:32
Total length:			43:37

== Cinematography ==
The film takes a theatrical form, largely attributed to the set of the film and script. Cinematographer Fali Mistry contributes much to the film with atmospheric lighting, especially during night scenes and is able to create an essence of darkness in the hilltop mansion which adds an element of suspense.
