= Ramola Devi =

Indian actress

- Rachel Cohen
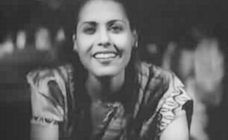
- Ramola in Khazanchi (1941)
- Born: 7 July 1917; Mumbai, India
- Died: 10 December 1988 (aged 71); Mumbai, India
- Occupation: Actress
- Years active: 1937–1951
- Height: 1.50 m (4 ft 11 in)
- Children: 1

Rachel Cohen (7 July 1917 – 10 December 1988), better known by the screen name Ramola Devi, was an Indian actress. Born in a Jewish family of Baghdadi origin, she became one of the most prominent Indian film stars during the 1940s. Her best-known role was in the top-grossing musical Khazanchi (1941), which is described as the first golden jubilee hit of Hindi cinema. (Note: A film that completes a continuous theatrical run of 50 weeks or more in a single cinema hall is described as a golden jubilee hit.)

Commenting on Ramola's popularity in 1944, The Bombay Chronicle reported that her "every fresh appearance is a major event in the picture-going world." Her successful films included Hum Bhi Insaan Hain (1948) and Sawan Aya Re (1949).

Ramola retired from films in the early 1950s. Kishore Sahu, the director of Sawan Aya Re, said that her "premature exile ... from the screen had deprived the industry of one of its greatest and most versatile thespians."

== Early life ==
Ramola Devi was born as Rachel Cohen in 1917 in Bombay, British India, to a Jewish family whose roots are in Baghdad, Iraq. Her father Haim Cohen, a school principal, who moved the family to Calcutta where she graduated from school. Together with her two sisters, Ramola acted on stage as an amateur before entering films. Ramola was drawn to the stage profession from a young age, and immediately after graduating she decided to pursue her dream.

== Career ==
She appeared in theater plays and a number of short and local Bengali films, such as Graher Pher in 1937 but tried to break as an Indian national actress.

Ramola approached various producers, until the producer Kidar Sharma, who was very well known in the industry, agreed to give her a chance. Jedgish Sethi was the one who introduced between them. Sharma was at that time a producer, lyricist and screenwriter, mainly wrote dialogues for films but did not direct. Kedar Sharma pitched her to director Nitin Bose, who was a very famous director at that time. Bose made fun of her height and she was heart broken, then Sharma promised her that once he became a director he will give her the main role in his film.

Kidar Sharma kept his promise and cast her in his first film as a director in 1939 Dil Hi To Hai, a film about a middle-class father who sacrificed his whole life to educate his son and daughter, Ramola played the role of the daughter who broke her father's heart.

Her big breakthrough came in 1941 with the very successful black and white film Khazanchi, in the film which was a murder mystery, she played the main character "Madhuri". The film was one of the biggest hits of the early 1940s in India. The film's music composed by Ghulam Haider was a big part in revolutionizing Hindi film music from the theatrical style of the 1930s to a more of a free style using Punjabi folk rhythms in the 1940s as in the famous song from the film "Sawan Kai Nazare hain".

After the big success of her film Ramola kept acting in many movies which became very popular among the Indian audience. Ramola's acting career took off quickly, winning both the sympathy of the Indian audience and the sympathy of the critics.

Her famous movies were: Khamoshi (1942), Shukria (1944), Albeli (1945), Hum Bhi Insan Hain (1948) and more.

Her last three films were released in 1951 and thus ended her film career.

== Personal life ==
Ramola was married twice. From her first husband she had one son, Sam who migrated to Israel in the early 1950s. Her second husband was a Captain in the British Air Force, who helped to train Indian pilots in the India Air Force after 1948 Independence of India. She had two daughters, Dena and Linda, from her second marriage. She died in her apartment in Mumbai on 10 December 1988.

== Filmography ==
- Graher Pher 1937
- Dil Hi To Hai 1939
- Qaidi 1940
- Khazanchi 1941
- Albeli 1945
- Shukria 1944
- Jhooti Kasmen 1948
- Hum Bhi Insaan Hain 1948
- Do Baten 1949
- Sawan Aya Re 1949
- Rim Jhim 1949
- Maang 1950
- Basera 1950
- Jawani Ki Aag 1951
- Actor 1951
- Stage 1951
