= Munawar Sultana =

Actress from India

Munawwar Sultana
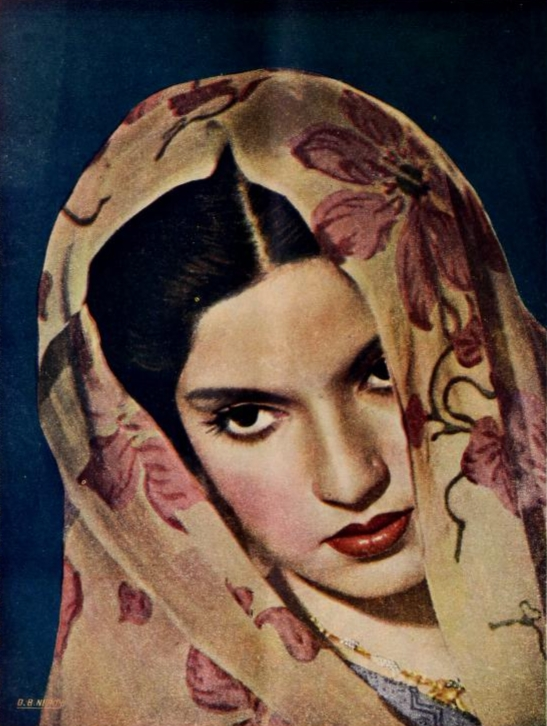
- Sultana in Pehli Nazar
- Born: Munawwar Sultana; 8 November 1924; Lahore, Punjab, British India
- Died: 15 September 2007 (aged 82); Mumbai, Maharashtra, India
- Occupation: Actress
- Years active: 1945–1956
- Spouse: Sharaf Ali
- Children: 4 sons, 3 daughters

Munawwar Sultana (8 November 1924 – 15 September 2007) was an Indian cinema actress, who acted in Hindi films. She is cited as one of the "popular" actresses of the late 1940s to early 1950s period, along with Noor Jehan, Swarnalata and Ragini. Her specialty was playing a selfless woman, enduring the rough treatment meted by her husband and family, but who eventually "brought her erring husband back home".

She came into prominence with Mazhar Khan's Pehli Nazar (1945), her first film in a leading role. A discovery of actor-producer-director Mazhar Khan, she became inundated with film offers, becoming one of the busiest actresses by 1949, along with other leading ladies such as Suraiya and Nargis. She starred in films with the leading heroes of the era like Prithviraj Kapoor, Dilip Kumar, Surendra, Motilal, Trilok Kapoor, Mahipal etc. Some of her successful films were Pehli Nazar, Dard (1947), Elaan (1947) Kaneez (1947), and Babul (1950).

== Early life ==
Munawar Sultana was born on 8 November 1924, in Lahore, Punjab, British India, into a strict Punjabi Muslim family. Munawar was born on the same day as Pakistani singer Munawar Sultana, and has the same name, but the two are not related.

According to an interview with son Sarfaraz and daughter Shaheen, conducted by Shishir Krishna Sharma, Munawar's father was a radio announcer. Munawar wanted to become a doctor, but was side-tracked by an offer in films. This was a small role in the film, Dalsukh Pancholi's Khazanchi (1941), where she played a barmaid, and had a song, "Peene Ke Din Aaye" picturised on her. She went by the screen name Asha for this period. According to Patel, Munawar came to Bombay from Lahore, courtesy of the actor-director Mazhar Khan in 1945. She became popular with her film Pehli Nazar, a role she stated was one of her favourites.

== Career ==
In 1945, she was visited in Lahore by producer-actor-director Mazhar Khan, who contracted her on a monthly fee of Rs. 4000 plus an apartment, and brought her to Bombay. Munawar's first film with Mazhar was Pehli Nazar, where she was cast opposite actor Motilal. In the popular song "Dil Jalta Hai Toh Jalne Do" (Let the Aflame Heart Burn) playbacked by singer Mukesh for Motilal, Khan focused on Munawar's close-ups during the picturisation.

=== 1940s ===
Following Pehli Nazar, she was kept busy through 1947 to 1949 working in several films. Baburao Patel wrote in the cine-mag Filmindia 1949, about her being one of the most over-worked actresses along with Suraiya and Nargis.

In 1947, Munawar acted in four films Dard, Elaan, Andhon Ki Duniya and Naiyya. Dard was directed by Abdul Rashid Kardar under Kardar Productions. In spite of no big stars being in the film, it turned out to be a surprise "musical hit" at the box office. The hero of the film was Kardar's brother Nusrat (Kardar), while Suraiya played the second lead, with Munawar Sultana as the main heroine. Munawar lip-synced three songs voiced for her by Uma Devi, a Naushad discovery. The song "Afsana Likh Rahin Hoon" became a big success. Elaan garnered positive reviews for Munawar. A Muslim social, the film was praised for its "progressive attitude" towards the need of education. It was directed by Mehboob Khan and had Surendra as the male lead.

The year 1948 saw Munawar in four more films. Parai Aag was produced by Great India Pictures and directed by Najam Naqvi. The film starred Munawar with Madhubala and Ulhas. Sona (Gold) was another Mazhar Khan-directed film for his Mazhar Arts Production. Majboor was a Bombay Talkies production, under the direction of Nazir Ajmeri. It had Shyam opposite Munawar with music by Ghulam Haider. Bombay Talkies had gone through several changes following Himanshu Rai's death, and Devika Rani's partnership with S. Mukherjee had produced several box office hits. With first, Mukherjee, and then Devika Rani leaving as head of production of Bombay Talkies, Ashok Kumar and S. Vacha returned to Bombay Talkies and took over control. Their first film was Majboor. The story was an "inter-communal" love story, with a Muslim boy falling for a Hindu girl. Munawar formed a "hit-pairing" with Shyam in this film, while Lata Mangeshkar came into prominence under the music direction of Ghulam Haider. Meri Kahani was directed by cameraman Keki Mistry and produced by Sharaf for Super Team Federal Productions (Bombay). The film co-starred Munawar and Madhubala with Surendra. A comedy of errors, it has the hero in a double role leading to mistaken identities.

1949 was Munawar's busiest year with seven releases. Dil Ki Duniya was directed by Mazhar Khan for his Noble Arts Production. It co-starred Geeta Bali and Mazhar with Munawar. The film was praised for its "versatility" and "well-balanced production values", along with good performances by Munawar, Mazhar and Geeta Bali. The film was claimed to have done "well" at the box office. Her standout film that year was Kaneez, directed by Krishna Kumar for Caravan Pictures. A Muslim social, it had Munawar with Shyam, and Kuldeep Kaur. She played a suffering woman married to a wayward husband, who eventually returns to her. It was described as one of her best roles.

=== 1950s ===
Out of her four films released in 1950, Munawar's most notable film was Babul (Father's House). She acted opposite Dilip Kumar and Nargis in this love triangle. Directed by S. U. Sunny, the music was composed by Naushad. The film became a major success at the box office. She acted in a few more films till 1956, with Jallad being her last appearance.

== Personal life ==
While working in films, Munawar met Sharif Ali, an affluent businessman who supplied furniture for movie sets. He had financed and produced two films starring Munawar Sultana, namely Meri Kahani (1948) and Pyar Ki Manzil (1950). They got married in 1954, at which point Munawar Sultana quit acting. Her final film, Jallad was released in 1956, but had been completed before she got married. Munawar Sultana eventually had seven children. The family lived in a house on Ambedkar Road in the posh Pali Hill area of Mumbai, where many of Munawar's contemporaries in the film industry also lived. Her husband died suddenly in 1966, when the eldest of their seven children was only eleven years old. However, the family was still comfortably off as both Munawar Sultana and her husband had managed to keep their finances in good condition. For the last eight years of her life, she suffered from Alzheimer's disease. She died peacefully at her home on 15 September 2007, at the age of eighty-two.

== Filmography ==
List:

Year	Film	Director	Co-stars	Producer
1941	Khazanchi	Moti B. Gidwani	M. Ismail, S.D. Narang, Ramola Devi	D. M. Pancholi (Pancholi Productions, Lahore)
1945	Pehli Nazar	Mazhar Khan	Motilal, Veena, Baburao Pendharkar, Bibbo, Cuckoo	Mazhar Khan for Mazhar Art Productions
1947	Andhon Ki Duniya	Keshavrao Date	Mahipal, Manmohan Krishna, Keshavrao Date	Rajkamal Kalamandir
1947	Dard	A. R. Kardar	Suraiya, Nusrat (Kardar), Husn Banu, Pratima Devi	A. R. Kardar
1947	Elaan	Mehboob Khan	Surendra, Himalayawala, Rehana, Zebunissa	Mehboob Productions
1947	Naiya	Aslam Noori	Mazhar Khan, Ashraf Khan, Balakram, Shahzadi, Suman	Mohan Pictures
1948	Majboor	Nazir Ajmeri	Shyam, Indu, Amir Banu	Bombay Talkies
1948	Meri Kahani	Keki Mistry	Surendra, Murad, Bhudo Advani	S. T. F. Productions
1948	Parai Aag	Najam Naqvi	Madhubala, Ulhas, Khalil	Great Indian Pictures
1948	Sona a.k.a. Gold	Mazhar Khan	Mazhar Khan, Dixit, Suman, Madan Puri	Mazhar Art Productions
1949	Dada	Harish	Sheikh Mukhtar, Shyam, Begum Para, Cuckoo, N. A. Ansari	Omar Khayyam Films
1949	Dil Ki Duniya	Mazhar Khan	Geeta Bali, Mazhar Khan, Suman, Madan Puri	Noble Art Productions
1949	Kaneez	Krishna Kumar	Shyam, Kuldip Kaur, Shyama, Urmila	Caravan Pictures
1949	Nisbat	S. Shamsuddin	Yakub, Zebu, Sofia, Jilloobai	Hindustan Art
1949	Raat Ki Rani	Jagdish Sethi	Shyam, Sulochana Chatterjee, Om Prakash, Madan Puri	J. S. Pictures
1949	Sawan Bhado	Ravindra Dave	Om Prakash, Indu, Ram Singh, Raj Adeeb	Prakash Pictures
1949	Uddhar	S. S. Kulkarni	Dev Anand, Bharat Bhushan, Nirupa Roy	Pratibha Chitra Mandir
1950	Babul	S. U. Sunny	Dilip Kumar, Nargis, Jankidas	Sunny Art Productions
1950	Pyar Ki Manzil	Keki Mistry	Rehman, Gope, Jankidas	Super Team Federal Productions
1950	Sabak	Mohammed Sadiq	Gajanan Jagirdar, Karan Dewan, Om Prakash, Kumar, Shyama	Sadiq Productions
1950	Sartaj	S. Khalil	Motilal, Shyama, Cuckoo	Omar Khayyam
1952	Apni Izzat	Nanabhai Bhatt	Motilal, Yakub, Yashodhra Katju	Harishchandra Pictures
1952	Tarang	I. C. Kapoor	Ajit, Jeevan, Manorama	Solar Films
1954	Ehsan	R. Sharma	Prithviraj Kapoor, Shammi Kapoor, Naaz, K. N. Singh	Mohla Films
1954	Toofan	Ram Prakash	Sajjan, Vijaylaxmi, Pran	Starlight Pictures
1954	Watan	Nanabhai Bhatt	Nirupa Roy, Trilok Kapoor, Jayant, Cuckoo, Madan Puri	Falcon Films
1955	Deewar	I.S. Bali	Bhagwan, Karan Dewan, Sheikh Mukhtar	Indralok Pictures
1956	Jallad	JayBee	Nasir Khan, Veena	Filmdom
