= Majboor (1948 film) =

1948 Indian Hindi language film

- Directed by: Nazir Ajmeri
- Written by: Nazir Ajmeri
- Produced by: Ashok Kumar; Savak Vacha
- Starring: Shyam; Munawar Sultana
- Cinematography: Roque Layton
- Music by: Ghulam Haider
- Production company: Bombay Talkies
- Release date: May 14, 1948
- Country: India
- Language: Hindi

Majboor is a 1948 Indian Hindi-language film directed by Nazir Ajmeri. Produced by Ashok Kumar and Savak Vacha under the banner of Bombay Talkies, the film stars Shyam and Munawar Sultana. Its soundtrack, composed by Ghulam Haider, featured songs that marked a breakthrough in the career of playback singer Lata Mangeshkar.

Released on 14 May 1948 in Bombay, Majboor received mixed reviews from critics and was a commercial success, completing a silver jubilee theatrical run in the city. The film is also known for the song "Dil Mera Toda Hai Kahin Ka Na Chhoda", which is regarded as one of Lata Mangeshkar's earliest major hits.

== Plot ==
Chandu is a mischievous young man living in a village with his foster father Gyani Babu, a respected welfare worker who serves as the village teacher and doctor. Gyani Babu reveals to Chandu that he is actually the son of a Muslim man and was adopted and raised as a Hindu. Before his death, Gyani warns Chandu about the difficulties that may arise from an inter-communal relationship.

Chandu is in love with Lalli, a Hindu girl, but the revelation about his origins creates a barrier between them. Meanwhile, Bala, Chandu's foster-sister, is in love with Bansi. The village Jagirdar, a powerful and villainous landowner, desires Bala and attempts to force the situation in his favour. He causes destruction to Bala's family, including setting fire to her father's property.

To save Bala from the Jagirdar, Chandu deliberately gets close to him and allows people to misunderstand his intentions. Lalli mistakes Chandu's concern for Bala as romantic interest, deepening her own suffering. The truth is that Chandu's feelings for Bala are those of a brother, as Bala's mother had nursed him after his adoption. The story reaches its climax when Chandu succeeds in reuniting Bala and Bansi, but is killed by the Jagirdar. His sacrifice becomes the film's final statement on communal harmony and human unity.

== Cast ==
According to Asian Film Directory and Who's Who (1952):

- Shyam as Chandu
- Munawar Sultana as Lalli
- Indu as Bala
- Sohanlal as Bansi
- Jagannath
- Dar Kashmiri as Jagirdar
- Gajnu
- Shamgulnar
- Munto Bai
- Amir Bano
- Shivraj
- Ram Shastri
- Lakshman Rai

== Production ==
The story of Majboor was written by Nazir Ajmeri, who also directed the film. During his tenure at Bombay Talkies, writer Saadat Hasan Manto had criticized Ajmeri's story for Majboor, but his objections were reportedly dismissed by the studio, with the argument that he was biased as a fellow writer.

== Music ==
The soundtrack of Majboor was composed by Ghulam Haider. It played an important role in the career development of Lata Mangeshkar, with Haider giving her a breakthrough with the songs "Dil Mera Toda Hai Kahin Ka Na Chhoda" and "Angrezi Chhora Chala Gaya". According to Mangeshkar's biographer Harish Bhimani, Haider composed the tune of "Dil Mera Toda Hai Kahin Ka Na Chhoda" while waiting for a train at Goregaon railway station, keeping rhythm on a 555 cigarette tin while Mangeshkar rehearsed the song.

== Release ==
Majboor was released in Bombay at the theatre Kamal Talkies on 14 May 1948.

== Reception ==
=== Critical reception ===
Reviewing Majboor for The Bombay Chronicle, a critic gave the film a largely negative assessment: while praising Roque Layton's cinematography and Munawar Sultana's acting performance, the review criticized the melodramatic story, unrealistic depiction of village life, and what it described as a forced use of Hindu–Muslim unity and religious symbolism involving the Buddha, Christ, and Mahatma Gandhi. The reviewer also considered the patriotic elements and several musical sequences to have been inserted artificially for commercial appeal.

A critic for The Times of India argued that although the film attempted to address social issues, it failed to provide a convincing treatment of its subject.

Baburao Patel of Filmindia praised Majboor for addressing the then-uncommon subject of inter-communal love, crediting Nazir Ajmeri's sensitive treatment of its premise. However, Patel criticized the screenplay for failing to fully develop the theme and found the pacing uneven. He particularly praised Shyam's performance as Chandu, writing that the role "makes [him] a bid for the front-rank of Indian stardom" and suggesting that he could emerge as a leading matinée idol alongside established actors such as Motilal and Ashok Kumar.

=== Commercial performance ===
According to The Bombay Chronicle, Majboor had a successful theatrical run in Bombay, and was also well received in the cities Poona, Bhavnagar, Jamnagar, and Sholapur. The newspaper attributed the film's popularity to its dramatic treatment of contemporary inter-communal relations.

Majboor completed a silver jubilee theatrical run in Bombay in September 1948. Bombay Talkies marked the occasion with a function at Kamal Talkies, where Justice Mangaldas V. Desai presented gold medals to director Nazir Ajmeri, music director Ghulam Haider, lyricist Nazam Panipati, and actors Munawar Sultana, Shyam, and Indu.
