= Moti B. Gidwani =

Indian filmmaker (born 1905)

Moti B. Gidwani (born 1905) is an Indian filmmaker who worked in Hindi and Punjabi cinema. Born in Karachi, British India, he graduated in 1925 and subsequently travelled to Great Britain to study cinema. He returned to India in 1928, and made his directorial debut with the silent film Nisha Sundari (1929). He ventured into film production the following year with Bachcha Sakka (1930).

Gidwani c. mid-1930s

Gidwani initially worked for Imperial and Sagar Movietone and later established a reputation as a reliable freelance director. He may have collaborated with Ardeshir Irani on Alam Ara (1931), India's first sound film. In 1937, Gidwani directed Kisan Kanya, which used the Cinecolour process and is recognised as India's first indigenously produced colour feature film. During the 1940s, Gidwani collaborated with producer Dalsukh M. Pancholi on several successful films, including the Punjabi film Yamla Jat (1940), and the Hindustani musicals Khazanchi (1941) and Zamindar (1942).

Critic Baburao Patel considered Gidwani one of the "few directors in Bombay who know the photographic technique well in addition to their own jobs". In a 1946 profile of Gidwani published in Filmdom, journalist R. A. Shaikh credited him with directing most of Pancholi's successful films, describing his pictures as "hard to beat" in their "clarity of directorial style and chastity of accents". Gidwani's Khazanchi (1941), the year's highest-grossing Indian picture, has influenced modern Hindi filmmaking; cultural professor Rachel Dwyer counts it among the films which "establish[ed] the musical style of the Hindi film industry in subsequent years".

== Filmography ==
=== Silent films ===
- Nisha Sundari (1929; also known as Midnight Girl) – Directorial debut; its financial failure led to the closure of Maharashtra Film Company
- Baccha Sakka (1930; aka Josh-e-Jawani and Romance of A Youth) – Also producer
- Dav Pech (1930; aka The Web) – starring Master Vithal
- Veer Na Ver (1930; aka The Conqueror)
- Gulam (1931; aka Slave) – written by Vijay Bhatt

=== Sound films ===
All films are in Hindustani language, unless specified.

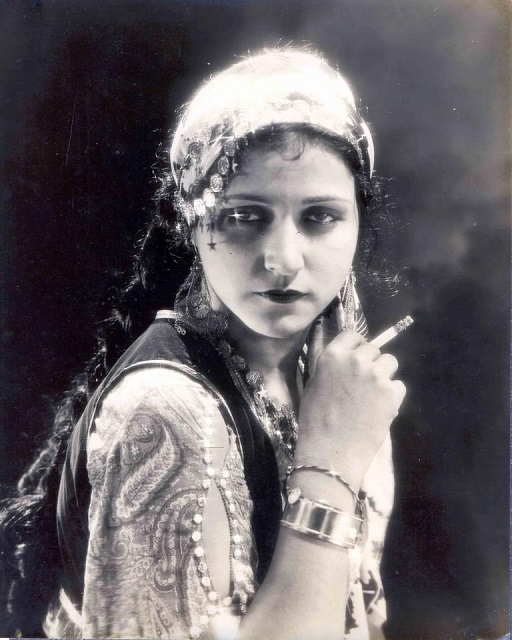
Publicity still of Gidwani's Daku Ki Ladki (1933), featuring leading lady Sulochana

- Anangsena (1931)
- Niti Vijay (1932; aka Noorani Moti)
- Daku Ki Ladki (1933) – co-directed by R. S. Chowdhury and starring Dinshaw Billimoria and Sulochana
- Insan Ya Shaitan (1933; aka Fateh Imaan) – starring Jaddanbai
- Manjari (1934)
- Noor Mahal (1934; aka Kamar-al-Zaman)
- Gulam Daku (1936)
- Do Auratein (1937; aka Two Women)
- Kisan Kanya (1937) – first Indian colour film made indigenously using Cinecolor process; produced by Ardeshir Irani under Imperial Film Company and written by Saadat Hasan Manto
- Yamla Jat (1940) – Punjabi-language film starring Pran and Noor Jehan; produced by Dalsukh M. Pancholi
- Khazanchi (1941) – produced by Pancholi; described in The Encyclopedia of Indian Cinema (2014) as a "musical megahit from Lahore often cited as the precursor of the commercial Hindi cinema's editing and sound-mixing style and trend-setter of Hindi-Urdu film music"
- Zamindar (1942) – sequel of Khazanchi; produced by Pancholi
- Kaise Kahun (1945) – starring Gajanan Jagirdar
- Khamosh Nigahen (1946)
