= Khandaan (1942 film) =

- Film poster
- Directed by: Shaukat Hussain Rizvi
- Written by: Imtiaz Ali Taj
- Story by: Imtiaz Ali Taj
- Produced by: Pancholi Pictures
- Starring: Pran; Noor Jehan Manorama; M. Ajmal; Ghulam Mohammed; Ibrahim
- Edited by: M.A.Latif
- Music by: Ghulam Haider
- Production company: P.H.P Lahore
- Release date: 25 April 1942
- Running time: 2 hours 54 minutes
- Country: British India
- Language: Hindustani

Khandaan

Khandaan (transl. Family), also spelled as Khan Daan, is a 1942 muslim social Bollywood film directed by Shaukat Hussain Rizvi (in his directorial debut) and produced by D.M. Pancholi, starring Pran, Noor Jehan, Ghulam Mohammed and M. Ajmal.

It was written by author Imtiaz Ali Taj and made in Pancholi's Lahore studio. For the first time in British India, there was a lot of "ahead of film release" publicity for this film. As a result, this became a much-awaited film for the Indian public and became a hit film when released. Noor Jehan achieved an overnight stardom following the success of the film. The film also established the career of director Rizvi and music composer Haider.

Khandaan is among the few surviving films that hailed from the genre of Muslim social films and was produced in Lahore, British India.

== Plot ==
A rich man is seduced by a gold-digging woman. When she later betrays him, the man kills her along with her new lover. He is arrested and sent to jail for a long time. When he is released, he finds employment as a gardener (not knowing that the employer is his own son) and becomes a father-figure to his employer's son Anwar and to Anwar's fiancée Zeenat. When he sees the young Anwar falling into the same kind of trap he had all those years ago, he does his best to prevent the tragedy of his own life from being repeated in Anwar's.

== Cast ==
- Noor Jehan as Zeenat
- Manorama as Nargis
- Moolchand as riding bicycles behind Noor Jehen's car
- Ghulam Mohammed as Amjad
- Pran Krisnan as Anwar
- M. Ajmal as Iqbal
- Ibrahim (Heengwala) as Akbar
- Durga Mota as Augustus
- Baby Akhtar as Najma
- Nafees Begum as Mother
- G. N. Butt as Ramsaran
- M. Channi as Nisar

== Music ==
The music was composed by Ghulam Haider and the lyrics by M. D. Taseer, Nazim Panipati and D. N. Madhok. The playback singers include Noor Jehan, Shamshad Begum, Ghulam Haider and Nasim Akhtar. This film was a landmark movie for Ghulam Haider and Noor Jehan as well as the film director Shaukat Hussain Rizvi. All three ended up becoming well-sought-after persons.

1. "Mere Liye Jahan Mein Chaen Hai Naa Qaraar Hai" - Noor Jehan

2. "Tu Kaunsi Badli Mein Mere Chand Hai Aaja" - Noor Jehan

3. "Khelenge Hum Aankh Macholi" - Noor Jehan

4. "Mere Baagh Ka Mali Phir Aagaya" - Shamshad Begum

5. "Maar Gayi Re Hamein Teri Nazaria" - Noor Jehan

6. "Udja Udja Panchhi Udja" - Noor Jehan & Ghulam Haider

7. "Chalo Paniya Bharan Ko Chalein" – Shamshad Begum & Nasim Akhtar

8. "Mere Mann Ka Panchhi Kyun Bole" – Noor Jehan

9. "Meri Ammi Ka Raj Bhala" - Shamshad Begum
