= Kaneez (1949 film) =

Film from India

- Directed by: Krishan Kumar
- Screenplay by: Hasrat Lucknavi
- Story by: Hasrat Lucknavi
- Produced by: Krishan Kumar
- Starring: Munawar Sultana; Shyam; Kuldeep Kaur; Ramesh Sinha; Khwaja Sabir; Nazir Kashmiri; Urmila Devi; Jillo Bai; Tiwari
- Music by: Ghulam Haider; Hansraj Behl; O.P. Nayyar (Film score)
- Release date: 1949
- Country: India
- Language: Hindi

Kaneez is a 1949 Indian Hindi-language drama film, directed and produced by Krishan Kumar, starring Shyam, Munawar Sultana and Kuldip Kaur in lead roles.

== Plot ==
Sabira is the daughter of a wealthy man, Akbar, who is cheated by his manager, Hamid, and forced into a mental home. Sabira marries Hamid's son, Akhtar, but the marriage is destroyed by a woman called Darling, who is after Akhtar for his money. Sabira is forced to become a servant in her own house, but she recovers her place as the mistress as Darling is exposed and Akhtar realized her worth for him.

== Cast ==
- Munawwar Sultana as Sabira, Akbar's daughter
- Shyam as Akhtar, Hamid's son
- Urmila Devi as Hamida
- Kuldip Kaur as Miss Darling
- Jillo as Sakira
- Khwaja Sabir as Hamid Ul Hasan, Akbar's manager
- Shyama as Suraiya
- S.K. Prem as Anwar
- Ramesh Sinha as Seth Akbar
- Bibi as Sakira
- Nazir Kashmiri as Family Doctor
- Baby Anwari as Young Hamida
- Baby Urmila as Young Sabira
- Master Naresh as Young Akhtar

== Music ==
The music was composed by the two very well known composers then, Ghulam Haider and Hansraj Behl with a large playback of Shamshad Begum, Mohammad Rafi, Surinder Kaur, Geeta Dutt, Zeenat Begum, G. M. Durrani, S. D. Batish, Rajkumari Dubey and Kishore Kumar. The lyrics were written by Hasrat Lucknavi, Sarshar Sailani, Shahir Ghaznavi and Harishchandra Akhtar. O.P. Nayyar composed the background music.

1. Duniya Mein Ameeron Ko — Kishore Kumar, Mohammed Rafi (Music: Ghulam Haider, lyrics: Hasrat Lucknowi, S.D. Batish)
