= Khamosh Nigahen (1946 film) =

1946 Hindi film

- Directed by: Moti B. Gidwani
- Starring: Asha Posley; Pran; Manorama
- Release date: 1946
- Country: India
- Language: Hindi

Khamosh Nigahen is a Bollywood film. It was released in 1946.

== Cast ==
- Asha Posley
- Pran
- Manorama
- Zahoor Shah
