= Kisan Kanya =

1937 film by Moti Gidwani

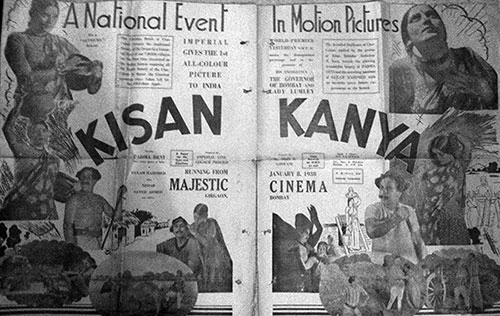
- Kisan Kanya
- Directed by: Moti B. Gidwani
- Written by: and Dialogue by: Sa'adat Hasan Manto
- Screenplay by: Sa'adat Hasan Manto
- Story by: Prof. M. Ziauddin
- Produced by: Ardeshir Irani
- Starring: Padma Devi; Zillo; Ghulam Md; Master Nissar; Sayed Ahmed; Gani
- Cinematography: Rostam Irani
- Music by: Ram Gopal Pandey
- Production company: Imperial Films
- Distributed by: Supreme Film Distributors
- Release date: January 8, 1937
- Running time: 137 min
- Country: India
- Language: Hindi

Kisan Kanya (lit. 'The Farmer’s Daughter') is a 1937 Indian Hindi-language film directed by Moti B. Gidwani and produced by Ardeshir Irani under the banner of Imperial Pictures. Made using Cinecolor, the film is based on a novel by Saadat Hasan Manto that highlights the struggles of poor farmers.

The film is historically significant as India’s first indigenously made colour film. While V. Shantaram's Sairandhri (1933) featured scenes in colour, it was processed and printed in Germany, distinguishing Kisan Kanya as the first colour film entirely produced within India.

== Cast ==
- Padma Devi as Bansri
- Jilloo as Ramdai
- Ghulam Mohammed as Randheer
- Master Nissar as Ramu
- Syed Ahmed as Muneem
- Gani Gani as the Zamindar (landlord)

== Production ==
Film pioneer Ardeshir Irani, who had produced notable films as Nala Damayanti (1920) which was India's first international co-production (with Italy) and India's first talkie Alam Ara (1931) conceived the idea of producing a color film. The result of his efforts was the color film Kisan Kanya made with the Cinecolor process whose process rights Irani had obtained from an American company. The film performed moderately at the box-office. Kisan Kanya was based on a novel by Saadat Hasan Manto and focused on the plight of poor farmers.

== Songs ==
The film had music by Ram Gopal Pandey, and had ten songs:

No.	Title	Singer(s)	Length
1.	"Aisa Nagar Basaya Jis Me"	Padma Devi, Nissar	3:24
2.	"Bolo Aali Mere Sune Shant Hriday Me"	Padma Devi, Nissar	3:26
3.	"Chain Mera Chheen Liya Hain"	Gulshan Sufi
4.	"Chal Ri Sakhi Tu Gagar Lekar"	Padma Devi, Zilloo	3:21
5.	"Dhaan Ke Pole Bhar Bhar Baandhe"
6.	"Dil Bas Me Nahi Hai Mera"	Padma Devi	3:16
7.	"Maati Hamaari Janani Hain"
8.	"Mujhe Jungle Ki Rani"
9.	"Saajan Preet Ko Tod Naa Jaana"
10.	"Teri Kat Gayee Jeevan Dor"	Shah Ali

== Trivia ==
- The first Indian color film to be made entirely in India (the earlier Sairandhri (1933) was processed and printed in Germany). This film was also more favorably received than its predecessor.

== See also ==
- List of early color feature films
