= Sawan Aya Re =

- Screen shot from Sawan Aya Re
- Directed by: Kishore Sahu
- Produced by: Kishore Sahu
- Starring: Kishore Sahu; Ramola Devi; David; Mohana Cabral
- Cinematography: K. H. Kapadia
- Edited by: Kantilal B. Shukla
- Music by: Khemchand Prakash
- Production company: Hindustan Chitra
- Release date: 1949
- Country: India
- Language: Hindi

Sawan Aya Re (The Monsoon Has Come) is a 1949 Hindi romantic drama film, directed by Kishore Sahu. Produced by Sahu under his "Hindustan Chitra" banner, it had Khemchand Prakash as the music director. The cast included Kishore Sahu, Ramola Devi, David, Pratima Devi, Ramesh Gupta, Sofia and Mohana.

The film was a romantic triangle set against the backdrop of a hill station, Nainital. A family arrives on a holiday, but the father is more keen on finding bridegrooms for his three daughters.

== Plot ==
Anand (Kishore Sahu) lives in Nainital with his mother (Pratima Devi). They meet the Mathur family who have recently arrived there for holidays. The father wants to get his three daughters Asha, Sudha and Rama married and is hoping to find some suitable boys for them. When Asha and Anand meet they form a friendship, which is readily accepted by the two families who decide to get them married. However, Asha finds out that Anand and Sudha are in love with each other.

== Cast ==
- Kishore Sahu as Anand
- Ramola Devi as Asha
- David as Ranvir Khanna
- Mohana Cabral
- Ramesh Gupta
- Sofia
- Gulab
- Pratima Devi as Anand's mother
- Anant Prabhu
- Promoth Bose

== Box-office And Reception ==
The film did well commercially, with Baburao Patel of Filmindia remarking in the 1949 May edition that Sahu's estimate had risen due to the "original treatment" he gave to an "otherwise ordinary" story.

== Soundtrack ==
The music director was Khemchand Prakash. The notable songs were "Ae Dil Na Mujhe Yad Dila" sung by Khan Mastana, "Mein Toh Gawan Chali" by Shamshad Begum, and "Nahin Faryaad karte Hum" also sung by Shamshad Begum. The four lyricists were Gulshan Jalalabadi, Arzoo Lakhnavi, Rammurti Chaturvedi and Bharat Vyas. The playback singers were Shamshad Begum, Amirbai Karnataki, Laita Devulkar, Mohammed Rafi and Khan Mastana.

=== Song list ===
#	Title	Singer	Lyricist
1	"Nahin Fariyad Karte Hum"	Shamshad Begum	Bharat Vyas
2	"Baagon Mein Haule Haule Bole Maina"	Shamshad Begum	Bharat Vyas
3	"Main To Chanda Si Gori Naar"	Shamshad Begum	Gulshan Jalalabadi
4	"Thandi Thandi Raat Mein"	Shamshad Begum	Bharat Vyas
5	"Ae Dil Na Mujhe Yaad Dila"	Shamshad Begum, Mohammed Rafi	Bharat Vyas
6	"Khushi Ki Aas Rahi Dil Ko"	Khan Mastana	Arzoo Lakhnavi
7	"Pehne Peeli Rang Saari"	Amirbai Karnataki	Rammurti Chaturvedi
8	"Aaya Aaya Re Aaya Re Saawan"	Lalita Devulkar	Rammurti Chaturvedi
