= Yamla Jat =

1940 film

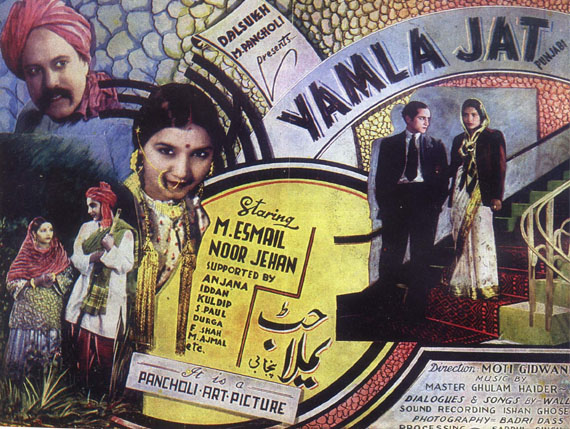
- Movie poster
- Directed by: Moti B. Gidwani
- Screenplay by: Khadim Mohyudin
- Produced by: Pancholi Art Production
- Starring: M. Ismail; Noor Jehan; Pran; Durga Khote; Anjana; M. Ajmal
- Music by: Ghulam Haider
- Production company: Pancholi Art Pictures
- Release date: 1940 (British India)
- Country: India
- Language: Punjabi

Yamla Jat (transl. Mad Jat) is a 1940 British Indian Punjabi-language film directed by Moti B. Gidwani. It stars M. Ismail, Noor Jehan and Pran in the lead roles. The music is composed by Ghulam Haider and lyrics written by Wali Sahib for playback singers Noor Jehan and others. A popular song from this film is: "kankaan diyaan fasalaan pakiyaan ne, badalaan vichon khushian vassiyaan ne".

== Plot ==
Dhanna, belonging to the Jat caste, was simple and had acute shrewdness too. These two qualities coupled with a kind heart and a considerate disposition had made his character lovable and sweet. He had two daughters Munni, aged eleven, and Rani aged seventeen. He treated Rani as his own daughter although she was adopted.

They were leading a content life. Rani had already won the heart of an exemplary young man. The simple village life, combined with their love, promised them an idyllic living. However, an event occurred which caused them to be influenced by city life. Summons arrived for Rani and Dhanna, requiring them to attend the court in the city. Dhanna could not believe that his beloved could escape the influences of city life. Dhanna, Rani, and Munni came over to the city. Rani's real father had left them a large property and ten lakhs in cash. This fate had influenced these simple villagers by city glamour and its artificial life.

At the very outset, attorney of the previous Seth with the help of a crafty woman hatched a conspiracy to get money from these simple villagers. No doubt Dhanna was a simple villager but his shrewdness proved too good for them. He saw through their artifices and exposed them thoroughly that the plot fell through. Other people, too, counted on the simplicity and simple-mindedness of this villager to empty his pockets but before Dhanna's shrewdness, their efforts fell flat.

While the corrupting influence of the city and its criminals failed to affect Dhanna, his naive daughter could not escape their hold. Dazzled by the city's glamour, she fell prey to Kuldip, a charming womanizer well-versed in deception. Kuldip was the son of the same barrister who had previously conspired against Rani's father. Not only did Kuldip gamble, drink, and live recklessly, but he had also deserted his own wife. By exploiting the girl's infatuation with urban life, he completely captivated her. Consequently, she ignored her father's pleas, insulted her younger sister, forgot Ramoo's sincere affection, and threw away the parting gifts he had given her.

Kuldip gained ground over Rani and succeeded in creating a gulf between her and her father. Frequent quarrels became a usual occurrence in their house. Loving and obedient Rani became indifferent. She drifted away and away. Every effort of her father to reclaim her and make her see met with insults from Rani. He reminded her of his love, she taunted him with money he had received from her deceased father. He shed tears, she returned angry words.

This unsuspecting spoilt child went for a picnic with Kuldip. To her great surprise and his extreme discomfiture she found Kuldip's real wife waiting for them there. She was an innocent creature and a deserted wronged mother and stood there with Kuldip's infant in her lap. She did not speak but her tears delivered the message about real Kuldip to Rani. This served as an eye-opener to Rani. She suddenly remembered her father, his love, his entreaties, and his advice. She remembered Ramoo, his love, and the promise she had made him. She was completely disillusioned.

No conveyance was fast enough to carry her back home. She wanted to fly back to the bosom of her father and ask his pardon but it was too late.

== Cast ==
- M. Ismail as Dhanna
- Noor Jehan as Munni
- Anjana as Rani
- Kuldip
- S. Paul as Ramoo
- Durga Khote
- F. Shah
- M. Ajmal
- Pran as Kuldip

== See also ==
- Mangti
