= Shaheed (1948 film) =

- Directed by: Ramesh Saigal
- Written by: Ramesh Saigal; Qamar Jalalabadi
- Story by: Ramesh Saigal
- Produced by: Filmistan Ltd.
- Starring: Kamini Kaushal; Dilip Kumar; Chandra Mohan; Leela Chitnis; Ram Singh
- Cinematography: Marshall Braganza
- Edited by: Pundalik
- Music by: Ghulam Haider
- Distributed by: Filmistan Ltd.
- Release date: 26 March 1948
- Running time: 145 mins
- Country: India
- Language: Hindustani

Shaheed ('The Martyr') is a 1948 Bollywood Indian romance film, written and directed by Ramesh Saigal. The film depicts India's struggle for independence.

It starred Kamini Kaushal, Dilip Kumar, Chandra Mohan, and Leela Chitnis. It had music by Ghulam Haider. Shaheed was the Highest grossing indian movie of 1948.

== Plot ==
Circa 1940s India, a young freedom fighter Ram faces opposition from his own father Raibahadur Dwarakadas as well as an ambitious police officer Vinod, who is also his rival for affection of a mutual childhood sweetheart Sheila.

== Cast ==
- Dilip Kumar as Ram
- Kamini Kaushal as Sheila
- Chandra Mohan as Rai Bahadur Dwarkadas
- Leela Chitnis as Mrs. Dwarkadas
- V. H. Desai as Hemant Rai
- S. L. Puri
- Ram Singh as Vinod
- Prabhu Dayal as Gopal
- Raj Adib
- Shashi Kapoor as Young Ram
- N. Kabir as Young Vinod
- Baby Anwari as Young Sheela

== Soundtrack ==
The music composed by Ghulam Haider, while lyrics written by Raja Mehdi Ali Khan and Qamar Jalalabadi. Songs like "Watan ki Raah Mein Watan Ke Naujawan Shaheed Ho" and "Badnaam Na Ho Jaaye Mohabbat Ka Fasana" have gained their popularity even after 60 years of the film's release.

No.	Title	Lyrics	Singer(s)	Length
1.	"Aaja Bedardi Baalma Koi Ro Ro Pukare"	Raja Mehdi Ali Khan	Geeta Dutt	03:24
2.	"Aana Hai To Aa Jao"	Qamar Jalalabadi	Surinder Kaur	02:23
3.	"Bachpan Ki Yaad Dhire Dhire"	Qamar Jalalabadi	Surinder Kaur	02:32
4.	"Badnaam Na Ho Jaaye Muhabbat Ka Fasaana"	Qamar Jalalabadi	Surinder Kaur	03:39
5.	"Hum Kahan Aur"	Raja Mehdi Ali Khan	Surinder Kaur	02:48
6.	"Kadam Utha Kar"	Raja Mehdi Ali Khan	Lalita Dewoolkar	03:08
7.	"Watan Ki Raah Mein Watan Ke Naujawan Shaheed Ho"	Raja Mehdi Ali Khan	Khan Mastana, Mohammed Rafi	03:22
Total length:				21:16

== See also ==
- Shaheed (1965 film), an Indian Hindi-language film
- 23rd March 1931: Shaheed, a 2002 Indian Hindi-language film
- Shaheed-E-Azam (martyr of freedom), 2002 Indian film directed by Sukumar Nair
