= Lata Mangeshkar =

Indian singer (1929–2022)

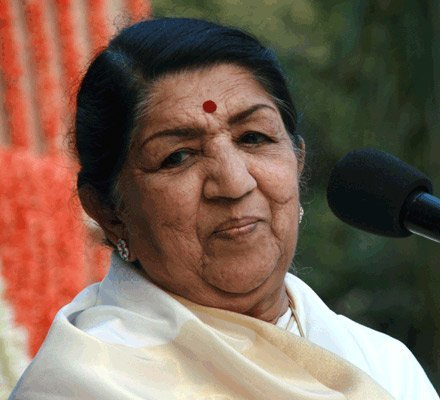
- Mangeshkar, c. 2008
- Born: Hemalata Dinanath Mangeshkar; 28 September 1929; Indore, Indore State, British India (present–day Madhya Pradesh, India)
- Died: 6 February 2022 (aged 92); Mumbai, Maharashtra, India
- Resting place: Ashes scattered in the Godavari River at Ramkund, Nashik, Maharashtra, India
- Other names: Queen of Melody; Voice of the Millennium; Swar Kokila (Vocal Nightingale); Lata Didi
- Occupations: Playback singer; composer; film producer
- Years active: 1942–2022
- Parents: Deenanath Mangeshkar (father); Shevanti Mangeshkar (mother)
- Relatives: See list
- Family: Mangeshkar family
- Awards: See list
- Honours: Padma Bhushan (1969); Dadasaheb Phalke Award (1989); Maharashtra Bhushan (1997); Padma Vibhushan (1999); Bharat Ratna (2001); Officer of the National Order of the Legion of Honour (2006)

Member of Parliament, Rajya Sabha
- In office 22 November 1999 – 21 November 2005
- Nominated by: K. R. Narayanan
- Preceded by: Nirmala Deshpande
- Constituency: Nominated (Arts)
- Musical career
- Genres: Filmi; classical; bhajans; ghazals; sufi; folk; khyal; thumri; gurbani; Bengali music; dangdut
- Instrument: Vocals

Lata Deenanath Mangeshkar (Marathi pronunciation: [ləˈt̪aː məŋˈɡeːʃkəɾ]; born Hemalata Deenanath Mangeshkar; 28 September 1929 – 6 February 2022) was an Indian playback singer and occasional music composer. She is considered to be one of the greatest and most influential singers of the Indian subcontinent. Her contribution to the Indian music industry in a career spanning eight decades gained her honorific titles such as the "Queen of Melody" and "Voice of the Millennium".

Mangeshkar recorded songs in over thirty-six Indian languages and a few foreign languages, though primarily in Hindustani, Bengali and Marathi.

Known for her discipline, Mangeshkar always recorded her songs barefoot as a mark of respect for the recording studio, which she considered a temple. Despite her perfectionism, she famously never listened to her own songs after their release, stating in interviews that she would only find mistakes in her singing.

She received accolades and honors throughout her career. In 1989, the Dadasaheb Phalke Award was bestowed on her by the Government of India. In 2001, in recognition of her contributions to the nation, she was awarded the Bharat Ratna, becoming only the second singer to receive India's highest civilian honour. In 2009, France made her an officer of the National Order of the Legion of Honour, the country's highest civilian award.

She was the recipient of three National Film Awards, 15 Bengal Film Journalists' Association Awards, four Filmfare Best Female Playback Awards, before declining further ones, two Filmfare Special Awards, the Filmfare Lifetime Achievement Award amongst others. In 1974, she became the first Indian playback singer to perform at the Royal Albert Hall in London, England.

She appeared in the Guinness World Records as the most recorded artist in history before being replaced by her sister, Asha Bhosle.

== Early life ==
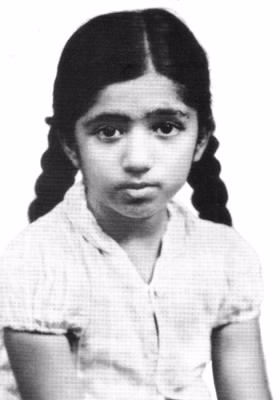
Childhood photo of Mangeshkar

Mangeshkar was born on 28 September 1929in Indore (in the present-day Indore district of Madhya Pradesh), then the capital of the princely state of Indore which was part of the Central India Agency in British India.

Her father, Deenanath Mangeshkar was a Marathi and Konkani classical singer and theatre actor. Deenanath's father was Ganesh Bhatt Bhikoba (Bhikambhatt) Navathe Hardikar (Abhisheki), a Karhade Brahmin who served as a priest at the famous Mangeshi Temple in Goa. Deenanath's mother Yesubai was his father's mistress belonging to the Devadasi community of Goa, a matrilineal community of temple artists now known as Gomantak Maratha Samaj. As a Devadasi, Yesubai was a reputed musician. Deenanath's father's surname was Hardikar. Deenanath had taken the surname Mangeshkar, based on the name of his ancestral village, Mangeshi in Goa.

Her mother, Shevanti (later renamed Shudhamati), was a Gujarati woman from Thalner, Bombay Presidency (now in northwest Maharashtra). Shevanti was Deenanath's second wife; his first wife Narmada, who had died before his marriage to Shevanti, was Shevanti's older sister. Her maternal grandfather, Seth Haridas Ramdas Lad, was from Gujarat, a prosperous businessman and landlord of Thalner. She learned Gujarati folk songs such as garbas of Pavagadh from her maternal grandmother.

Lata was named "Hema" at birth. Her parents later renamed her after a female character, Latika, in one of her father's plays.

She was the eldest child in the family. Meena, Asha, Usha and Hridaynath, in birth order, are her siblings; all are accomplished singers and musicians.

She received her first music lesson from her father. At the age of five, she started to work as an actress in her father's musical plays (Sangeet Natak in Marathi). On her first day of school, Mangeshkar left because she was not allowed to bring her sister Asha along with her.

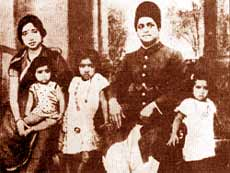
The Mangeshkar family

== Career ==
=== 1940s ===
In 1942, when Mangeshkar was 13, her father died of heart disease. Master Vinayak (Vinayak Damodar Karnataki), the owner of Navyug Chitrapat movie company and a close friend of the Mangeshkar family, took care of them. He helped her get started in a career as a singer and actress.

She sang the song "Naachu Yaa Gade, Khelu Saari Mani Haus Bhaari", which was composed by Sadashivrao Nevrekar for Vasant Joglekar's Marathi movie Kiti Hasaal (1942), but the song was dropped from the final cut. Vinayak gave her a small role in Navyug Chitrapat's Marathi movie Pahili Mangalaa-gaur (1942), in which she sang "Natali Chaitraachi Navalaai" which was composed by Dada Chandekar. Her first Hindi song was "Mata Ek Sapoot Ki Duniya Badal De Tu" for the Marathi film Gajaabhaau (1943). The Bollywood industry was yet to find its feet, so Mangeshkar had to first concentrate on acting, which she did not like, as the lights and people ordering her around made her feel uncomfortable.

She moved to Mumbai in 1945 when Master Vinayak's company moved its headquarters there. She started taking lessons in Hindustani classical music from Ustad Aman Ali Khan of Bhindibazaar Gharana. She sang "Paa Lagoon Kar Jori" for Vasant Joglekar's Hindi-language movie Aap Ki Seva Mein (1946), which was composed by Datta Davjekar. The dance in the film was performed by Rohini Bhate, who later became a famous classical dancer. Lata and her sister Asha played minor roles in Vinayak's first Hindi-language movie, Badi Maa (1945). In that movie, Lata also sang a bhajan, "Maata Tere Charnon Mein." She was introduced to music director Vasant Desai during the recording of Vinayak's second Hindi-language movie, Subhadra (1946).

In 1947, composer Anil Biswas introduced Mangeshkar to actor Dilip Kumar on a local train in Mumbai. Upon learning that Mangeshkar was Maharashtrian, Kumar remarked that the "Urdu of Marathis smells of dal and rice" (dal-bhaat), implying that their native accent would interfere with the correct pronunciation of Urdu lyrics. Mangeshkar was initially offended by the comment and reportedly did not speak to Kumar for thirteen years. However, she later used the critique as motivation to improve her diction, hiring a Maulvi to teach her the nuances of the Urdu language. This pursuit of phonetic perfection became a hallmark of her later career, particularly in her performances of Urdu Ghazals. The two eventually reconciled in August 1970, and Mangeshkar traditionally tied a Rakhi on Kumar's wrist every year thereafter.

After Vinayak's death in 1948, music director Ghulam Haider mentored her as a singer. He introduced her to producer Sashadhar Mukherjee, who was then working on the movie Shaheed (1948), but Mukherjee dismissed her voice as "too thin". An annoyed Haider responded that in coming years producers and directors would "fall at Lata's feet" and "beg her" to sing in their movies. Haider gave her her first major break with the song "Dil Mera Toda, Mujhe Kahin Ka Na Chhora"—lyrics by Nazim Panipati—in the movie Majboor (1948), which became her first big breakthrough film hit. In an interview on her 84th birthday in 2013, she declared "Ghulam Haider is truly my Godfather. He was the first music director who showed complete faith in my talent."

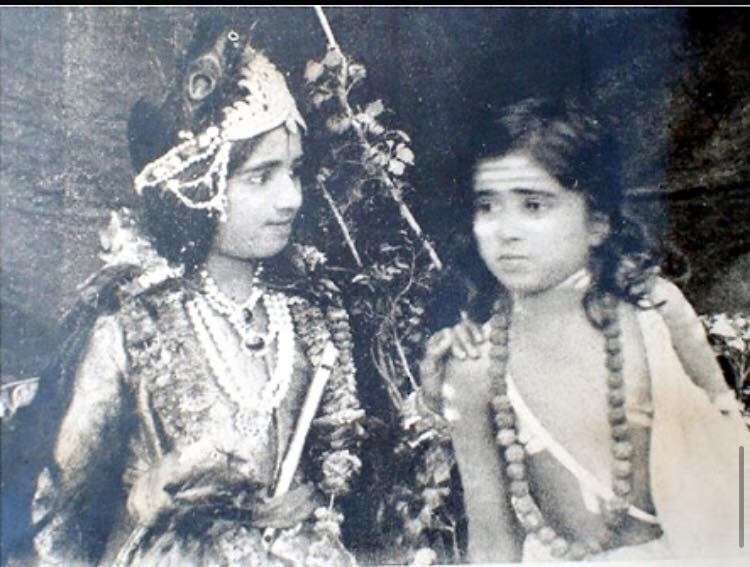
Lata Mangeshkar (as Krishna) with sister Meena Mangeshkar-Khadikar (as Sudama) during Gurukul play.

Initially, she is said to have imitated the acclaimed singer Noor Jehan, but she later developed her own style of singing. She brought a new signature style of singing to Indian film music, moving away from mehfil-style performances to suit both 'modern' and 'traditional' female protagonists. A soprano range voice with less volume or amplitude, she had enough weight in her voice to give definite shape to the melody of Indian film songs. Although she had limited coloratura skills in her early career, she developed better tone and pitch as she progressed in her playback career. Lyrics of songs in Hindi movies were, in those days, primarily composed by Urdu poets and contained a higher proportion of Urdu words, including the dialogue. In subsequent interviews she said that Noor Jehan heard her as a child and had told her to practice a lot. The two stayed in touch with each other for many years to come.

One of her first major hits was "Aayega Aanewaala," a song in the movie Mahal (1949), composed by music director Khemchand Prakash and lip-synced on screen by actress Madhubala. (Note: In an interview, Lata said that Madhubala used to have it written in her contract that her songs would be sung by Lata only.) This was a defining moment for her, and a catalyst for the recognition of playback singers in India. Before this, playback singers were seen as the vocal equivalent of stuntmen, and remained invisible and uncredited. This song was such a big hit that Radio Goa revealed her identity and she became a star in her own right. This opened the door for other playback singers to achieve recognition.

=== 1950s ===
In the 1950s, Mangeshkar sang songs composed by various music directors of the period, including Anil Biswas (in films such as Tarana (1951) and Heer (1956)), Shankar Jaikishan, Naushad Ali, S. D. Burman, Sardul Singh Kwatra, Amarnath, Husanlal, and Bhagatram (in films like Bari Behen (1949), Meena Bazaar (1950), Aadhi Raat (1950), Chhoti Bhabi (1950), Afsana (1951), Aansoo (1953), and Adl-e-Jehangir (1955)), C. Ramchandra, Hemant Kumar, Salil Chowdhury, Datta Naik, Khayyam, Ravi, Sajjad Hussain, Roshan, Kalyanji-Anandji, Vasant Desai, Sudhir Phadke, Hansraj Behl, Madan Mohan, and Usha Khanna. She sang "Sri Lanka, Ma Priyadara Jaya Bhumi", a song in Sinhala, for the 1955 Sri Lankan film Seda Sulang. Mangeshkar recorded her first Telugu song Nidhurapora Thammudaa in 1955 Telugu film Santhanam for music director Susarla Dakshinamurthi. She made her debut in Tamil playback singing with Vanaradham in 1956 (Uran Khotala dubbed in Tamil) with the Tamil song Enthan Kannalan for Nimmi in the dubbed version composed by Naushad.

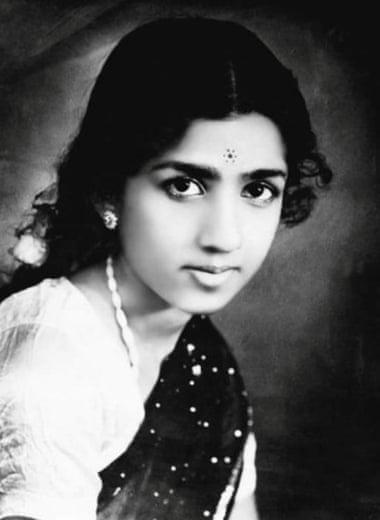
Mangeshkar in Pahili Mangalagaur

She sang many raga-based songs for Naushad in movies such as Deedar (1951), Baiju Bawra (1952), Amar (1954), Uran Khatola (1955) and Mother India (1957). Ae Chorre Ki Jaat Badi Bewafa, a duet with G. M. Durrani, was her first song for the composer Naushad. The duo, Shankar–Jaikishan, chose Mangeshkar for Barsaat (1949), Aah (1953), Shree 420 (1955) and Chori Chori (1956). Before 1957, composer S. D. Burman chose her as the leading female singer for his musical scores in Sazaa (1951), House No. 44 (1955), and Devdas (1955). However a rift developed between her and Burman in 1957, and she did not sing his compositions again until 1962.

In 1958, Mangeshkar famously protested against the lack of a playback singer category at the Filmfare Awards. She refused to perform the song "Rasik Balma" at the ceremony until the organizers agreed to recognize playback singers with their own awards category, which was eventually introduced in 1959.

She won a Filmfare Award for Best Female Playback Singer for Salil Chowdhury's composition "Aaja Re Pardesi" from Madhumati (1958). Her association with C. Ramchandra produced songs in movies such as Albela (1951), Shin Shinkai Bublaa Boo (1952), Anarkali (1953), Pehli Jhhalak (1954), Azad (1955), Aasha (1957), and Amardeep (1958). For Madan Mohan, she performed for films like Baagi (1953), Railway Platform (1955), Pocketmaar (1956), Mr. Lambu (1956), Dekh Kabira Roya (1957), Adalat (1958), Jailor (1958), Mohar (1959), and Chacha Zindabad (1959).

Her song Aye Maalik Tere Bande Hum which was the original composition of Vasant Desai and used in the film Do Aankhen Barah Haath on 1957, was adapted by a Pakistani school as the school anthem.

=== 1960s ===
Mangeshkar's song "Pyar Kiya To Darna Kya" from Mughal-e-Azam (1960), composed by Naushad and lip-synced by Madhubala, still remains famous. The Hawaiian-themed number "Ajeeb Dastaan Hai Yeh", from Dil Apna Aur Preet Parai (1960), was composed by Shankar–Jaikishan and lip-synced by Meena Kumari.

In 1961, she recorded two popular bhajans, "Allah Tero Naam" and "Prabhu Tero Naam", for Burman's assistant, Jaidev. In 1962, she was awarded her second Filmfare Award for the song "Kahin Deep Jale Kahin Dil" from Bees Saal Baad, composed by Hemant Kumar.

On 27 January 1963, against the backdrop of the Sino-Indian War, she sang the patriotic song "Aye Mere Watan Ke Logo" (literally, "Oh, People of My Country") in the presence of Jawaharlal Nehru, then the prime minister of India. The song, composed by C. Ramchandra and written by Kavi Pradeep, is said to have brought the prime minister to tears.

In 1963, she returned to collaborate with S. D. Burman. She had sung in R. D. Burman's first film, Chhote Nawab (1961), and later in his films such as Bhoot Bungla (1965), Pati Patni (1966), Baharon ke Sapne (1967), and Abhilasha (1969). She also recorded several popular songs for S. D. Burman, including "Aaj Phir Jeene Ki Tamanna Hai", "Gata Rahe Mera Dil" (duet with Kishore Kumar) and "Piya Tose" from Guide (1965), "Hothon Pe Aisi Baat" from Jewel Thief (1967), and "Kitni Akeli Kitni Tanhaa" from Talash.

During the 1960s, she continued her association with Madan Mohan, which included the songs "Aap Ki Nazron Ne Samjha" from Anpadh (1962), "Lag Jaa Gale" and "Naina Barse Rim Jhim" from Woh Kaun Thi? (1964), "Woh Chup Rahen To" from Jahan Ara (1964), "Tu Jahan Jahan Chalega" from Mera Saaya (1966) and "Teri Aankho Ke Siva" from Chirag (1969), and she had a continuing association with the maestros Shankar Jaikishan, who got her to sing in various genres in the 1960s.

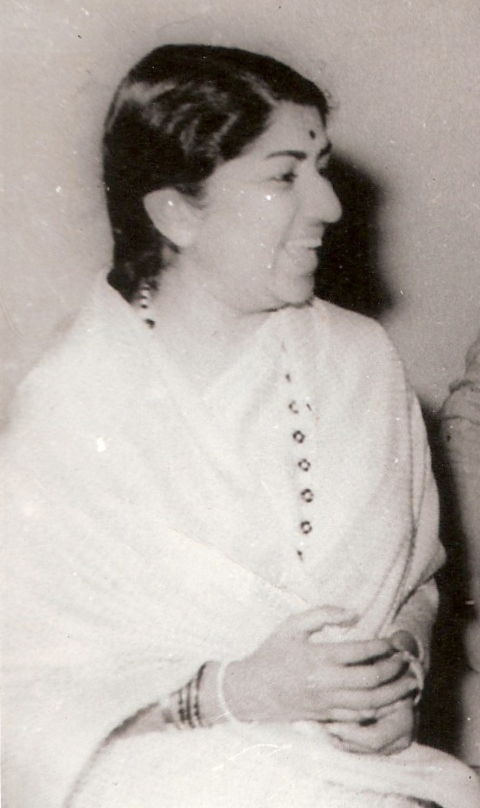
Mangeshkar in the 1960s

The 1960s also witnessed the beginning of her association with Laxmikant–Pyarelal, the music directors for whom she sang the most popular songs in her career. Starting in 1963, Laxmikant–Pyarelal's association with Mangeshkar grew stronger over the years. She sang over 700 songs for the composer duo over a period of 35 years, many of which became huge hits. She sang for Parasmani (1963), Mr. X in Bombay (1964), Aaye Din Bahar Ke (1966), Milan (1967), Anita (1967), Shagird (1968), Mere Hamdam Mere Dost (1968), Intaquam (1969), Do Raaste (1969) and Jeene Ki Raah, for which she got her third Filmfare Award.

She also sang several playback songs for Marathi films, composed by Marathi music directors including Hridaynath Mangeshkar, Vasant Prabhu, Srinivas Khale, Sudhir Phadke, Bhaskar Chandavarkar, Datta Davjekar, Yashwant Dev, Ram Kadam, Prabhakar Jog and herself, under the pseudonym Anandghan. During the 1960s and 1970s, she also sang several Bengali songs composed by music directors like Salil Chowdhury and Hemant Kumar.

She made her Kannada debut in 1967 for the film Kranthiveera Sangolli Rayanna by recording two songs for the music director Lakshman Berlekar. The song "Bellane Belagayithu" was well received and appreciated.

In the 1960s, she recorded duets with Kishore Kumar, Mukesh, Manna Dey, Mahendra Kapoor and Mohammed Rafi. For a brief period during the 1960s, she was not on good terms with Mohammed Rafi over the issue of royalty payments to singers. She wanted Rafi to back her in demanding a half-share from the five percent song royalty that the film's producer conceded to select composers. Rafi took a diametrically opposite view, and believed that a playback singer's claim on the filmmaker ended with the payment of the agreed fee for the song, leading to tensions between the two. After an argument during the recording of the song "Tasveer Teri Dil Mein", from Maya (1961), the two refused to sing with each other. The music director Shankar Jaikishan later negotiated a reconciliation between the two.

In 1969, he recorded the Marathi song "Mi Dolkara Daryacha Raja" alongside Lata Mangeshkar, composed by Hridaynath Mangeshkar. It emerged as a huge hit.

=== 1970s ===
In 1972, Meena Kumari's last film, Pakeezah, was released. It featured popular songs including "Chalte Chalte" and "Inhi Logon Ne", sung by Mangeshkar, and composed by Ghulam Mohammed. She recorded many popular songs for S. D. Burman's last films, including "Rangeela Re" from Prem Pujari (1970), "Khilte Hain Gul Yahaan" from Sharmeelee (1971) and "Piya Bina" from Abhimaan (1973) (Note: Abhimaan was directed by Hrishikesh Mukherjee, who always lavished praise on Mangeshkar's work. Her timeless contributions for Abhimaan included other classicals like Ab Toh Hai Tumse and Nadiya Kinare. Mangeshkar never charged anything for her work in Mukherjee's films. When asked about the fee, she would reply, Dada, aapse kya paisa lena? (O! my big brother. How may I take money from you!!)) and for Madan Mohan's last films, including Dastak (1970), Heer Raanjha (1970), Dil Ki Rahen (1973), Hindustan Ki Kasam (1973), Hanste Zakhm (1973), Mausam (1975) and Laila Majnu (1976).

Many of her notable songs in the 1970s were composed by Laxmikant–Pyarelal and Rahul Dev Burman. Many of her songs composed by Laxmikant-Pyarelal in the 1970s were written by the lyricist Anand Bakshi. She also recorded many hit songs with Rahul Dev Burman in the films Amar Prem (1972), Caravan (1971), Kati Patang (1971), and Aandhi (1975). The two are noted for their songs with the lyricists Majrooh Sultanpuri, Anand Bakshi, and Gulzar.

In 1973, she won the National Film Award for Best Female Playback Singer for the song "Beeti Na Bitai" from the film Parichay, composed by R. D. Burman, and written by Gulzar. In 1974, she sang her only Malayalam song "Kadali Chenkadali" for the film Nellu, composed by Salil Chowdhury, and written by Vayalar Ramavarma. In 1975, she again won the National Award, this time for the song "Roothe Roothe Piya" from the film Kora Kagaz, composed by Kalyanji Anandji.

From the 1970s onward, she also staged many concerts in India and abroad, including several charity concerts. She transformed the way Indian music concerts were perceived in the West. Her first concert overseas was at the Royal Albert Hall, London, in 1974. (Despite some sources claiming that she was the first Indian to do so, according to the Hall's own records, the first Indian to perform there was the late Ravi Shankar, on 21 October 1969). Until that time, film music concerts were song-and-dance affairs held in community halls and colleges, rarely taken seriously. Mangeshkar demanded to sing in mainstream halls only, which was an honour that was previously bestowed only upon classical musicians.

She also released an album of the Hindu poet Mirabai's bhajans, Chala Vaahi Des, composed by her brother Hridaynath Mangeshkar. Some of the bhajans in the album include "Saanware Rang Ranchi" and "Ud Jaa Re Kaaga". In the early 1970s, she released other non-film albums, such as her collection of Ghalib ghazals, an album of Marathi folk songs (Koli-geete), an album of Ganesh aartis (all composed by her brother Hridaynath) and an album of "abhangs" of Sant Tukaram composed by Shrinivas Khale.

In the 1978 Raj Kapoor-directed Satyam Shivam Sundaram, she sang the main theme song "Satyam Shivam Sundaram," among the chart-toppers of the year. The film's story is inspired by her, according to Kapoor's daughter Ritu Nanda in her book Raj Kapoor. The book quotes Kapoor as saying, "I visualised the story of a man falling for a woman with an ordinary countenance but a golden voice and wanted to cast Lata Mangeshkar in the role."

In the late 1970s and early 1980s, she worked with the children of composers she had earlier worked with. Some of these composers included Rahul Dev Burman, son of Sachin Dev Burman, Rajesh Roshan, son of Roshan, Anu Malik, son of Sardar Malik, and Anand–Milind, sons of Chitragupta. She also sang many songs in the Assamese language and developed a very good relationship with the Assamese musician Bhupen Hazarika. She sang many songs under his direction; the song "Dil Hoom Hoom Kare" from Rudaali (1993) made the highest record sales that year.

=== 1980s ===
From the 1980s onward, Mangeshkar worked with music directors such as Shiv-Hari in Silsila (1981), Faasle (1985), Vijay (1988), and Chandni (1989) and Ram Laxman in Ustadi Ustad Se (1981), Bezubaan (1982), Woh Jo Hasina (1983), Ye Kesa Farz (1985), and Maine Pyar Kiya (1989). She sang in other movies, such as Karz (1980), Ek Duuje Ke Liye (1981), Silsila (1981), Prem Rog (1982), Hero (1983), Pyar Jhukta Nahin (1985), Ram Teri Ganga Maili (1985), Nagina (1986), and Ram Lakhan (1989). Her song "Zu Zu Zu Yashoda" from Sanjog (1985) was a chartbuster. In the late 1980s, she made a comeback to Tamil films with two back-to-back renditions of composer Ilaiyaraaja's songs "Aaraaro Aaraaro" and "Valai Osai", for the films Anand (1987) and Sathyaa (1988), respectively. Mangeshkar recorded her second Telugu song, "Thella Cheeraku", for director K. Raghavendra Rao;s 1988 film Aakhari Poratam.

In the 1980s, the composer duo Laxmikant–Pyarelal had Mangeshkar sing their biggest hits—"Sheesha Ho Ya Dil Ho" in Asha (1980), "Tu Kitne Baras Ka" in Karz (1980), "Kitna Aasan Hai" in Dostana (1980), "Hum Ko Bhi Gham" in Aas Paas (1980), "Mere Naseeb Mein" in Naseeb (1980), "Zindagi Ki Na Toote" in Kranti (1981), "Solah Baras Ki" in Ek Duuje Ke Liye (1981), "Ye Galiyan Ye Chaubara" in Prem Rog (1982), "Likhnewale Ne Likh Dale" in Arpan (1983), "Din Maheene Saal" in Avtaar (1983), "Pyar Karnewale" and "Nindiya Se Jagi" in Hero (1983), "Zu Zu Zu Yashoda" in Sanjog (1985), "Zindagi Har Qadam" in Meri Jung (1985), "Baith Mere Paas" in Yaadon Ki Kasam (1985), "Ungli Mein Anghoti" in Ram Avtar (1988) and "O Ramji Tere Lakhan Ne" in Ram Lakhan (1989).

Some Rahul Dev Burman compositions for Mangeshkar in these years include "Aaja Sar-e-Bazaar" in Alibaba Aur 40 Chor (1980), "Bindiya Tarase" in Phir Wohi Raat (1981), "Thodi Si Zameen" in Sitara (1981), "Kya Yahi Pyar Hai" in Rocky (1981), "Dekho Maine Dekha" in Love Story (1981), "Tune O Rangeele" in Kudrat (1981), "Jaane Kaise Kab" in Shakti (1982), "Jab Hum Jawan Honge" in Betaab (1983), which became instantly popular, "Humein Aur Jeene" in Agar Tum Na Hote (1983), "Tujhse Naraaz Nahin" in Masoom (1983), "Kahin Na Ja" and "Jeevan Ke Din" in Bade Dil Wala (1983), "Jaane Kya Baat" in Sunny (1984), "Bhuri Bhuri Aankhon" in Arjun (1985), "Sagar Kinare" in Sagar (1985), "Din Pyar Ke Aayenge" in Savere Wali Gaadi (1986). "Kya Bhala Hai Kya", "Khamosh Sa Afsana" and "Seeli Hawa Chhoo" in Libaas (1988).

Rajesh Roshan's collaboration with Dev Anand in Lootmaar and Man Pasand resulted in songs such as "Paas Ho Tum Magar Qareeb" and "Sumansudha Rajni Chandha" respectively. Mangeshkar had duets with Rafi such as "Mujhe Chhoo Rahi Hain" in Swayamwar (1980), "Kabhi Kabhi Bezubaan" in Johny I Love You (1982), "Tujh Sang Preet" in Kaamchor (1982), "Angrezi Mein Khete Hai" in Khud-Daar (1982), "Ankhiyo Hi Ankhiyo Mein" in Nishaan (1983), "Dushman Na Kare" in Aakhir Kyon? (1985) and "Wada Na Tod" in Dil Tujhko Diya (1987), which was later featured on the soundtrack of the 2004 film Eternal Sunshine of the Spotless Mind.

Bappi Lahiri composed some songs for Mangeshkar, such as "Dooriyan Sab Mita Do" in Saboot (1980), "Baithe Baithe Aaj Aayi" in Patita (1980), "Jaane Kyun Mujhe" in Agreement (1980), "Thoda Resham Lagta Hai" in Jyoti (1981), "Dard Ki Ragini" in Pyaas (1982), and "Naino Mein Sapna" (duet with Kishore Kumar) in Himmatwala (1983).

Mohammed Zahur Khayyam continued to work with her during the 80s and composed songs such as "Hazaar Rahein Mud" (duet with Kishore Kumar) in Thodisi Bewafai (1980), "Simti Huyi" from Chambal Ki Kasam (1980), "Na Jane Kya Hua" in Dard (1981), "Chandni Raat Mein" in Dil-e-Nadaan (1982), "Dikhayi Diye" in Bazaar (1982), "Chand Ke Paas" in Dil-e-Nadaan (1982), "Bhar Lein Tumhe" and "Aaja Nindiya Aaja" from Lorie (1984) and "Kiran Kiran Mein Shokhiyan" in Ek Naya Rishta (1988).

During the 80s, Mangeshkar sang hits such as "Sun Sahiba Sun" in Ram Teri Ganga Maili (1985) for Ravindra Jain, "Chand Apna Safar" in Shama (1981), "Shayad Meri Shaadi" and "Zindagi Pyar Ka" in Souten (1983), "Hum Bhool Gaye Re" in Souten Ki Beti (1989) for Usha Khanna. Hridaynath Mangeshkar had "Kale Kale Gehre Saye" in Chakra (1981), "Ye Ankhen Dekh Kar", and "Kuchh Log Mohabbat Ko" in Dhanwan (1981), "Mujhe Tum Yaad Karna" in Mashaal (1984), Assamese song "Jonakore Rati" (1986) with music and lyrics by Dr. Bhupen Hazarika, "Jaane Do Mujhe" in Shahenshah (1989) for Amar-Utpal, "Sajan Mera Us Paar" in Ganga Jamuna Saraswati (1988) and "Mere Pyar Ki Umar" in Waaris (1989) for Uttam Jagdish.

In June 1985, the United Way of Greater Toronto invited her to perform at Maple Leaf Gardens. At the request of Anne Murray, Mangeshkar sang a cover of her song "You Needed Me". Over12,000 attendees were present at the concert, which raised $150,000 for the charity.

=== 1990s ===
During the 1990s, Mangeshkar recorded with music directors including Anand–Milind, Nadeem-Shravan, Jatin–Lalit, Dilip Sen-Sameer Sen, Uttam Singh, Anu Malik, Aadesh Shrivastava and A. R. Rahman. She recorded some non-film songs, including ghazals with Jagjit Singh. She also sang with Kumar Sanu, Amit Kumar, S. P. Balasubrahmanyam, Udit Narayan, Hariharan, Suresh Wadkar, Mohammed Aziz, Abhijeet Bhattacharya, Roop Kumar Rathod, Vinod Rathod, Gurdas Maan and Sonu Nigam. She also collaborated with Rhoma Irama in Indonesian language Dangdut songs.

In 1990, she launched her own production house for Hindi movies which produced the Gulzar-directed movie Lekin.... She won her third National Film Award for Best Female Playback Singer for singing most of the songs in the soundtrack album with Yaara Seeli Seeli being the highlight, which was composed by her brother Hridaynath.

In 1991, Indonesian dangdut singer Rhoma Irama invited Mangeshkar to collaborate on a number of songs on the album Album Khusus Soneta Volume 1 - Ratu Dangdut Dunia Lata Mangeshkar. Irama called Mangeshkar the "Ratu Dangdut Dunia" (World Dangdut Queen).

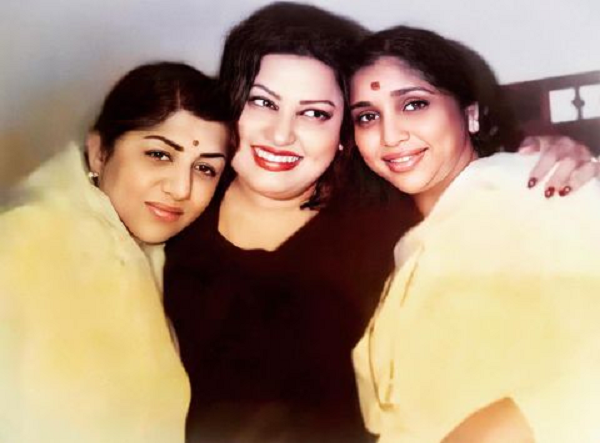
Lata Mangeshkar (left) with her sister Asha Bhosle (right) and Noor Jehan (center).

She sang for almost all the Yash Chopra films and films from his production house Yash Raj Films at that time, including Chandni (1989), Lamhe (1991), Darr (1993), Yeh Dillagi (1994), Dilwale Dulhania Le Jayenge (1995), Dil To Pagal Hai (1997) and later in Mohabbatein (2000), Mujhse Dosti Karoge! (2002) and Veer-Zaara (2004).

During 1990 she recorded with Raamlaxman in Patthar Ke Phool (1991), 100 Days (1991), Mehboob Mere Mehboob (1992), Saatwan Aasman (1992), I Love You (1992), Dil Ki Baazi (1993), Antim Nyay (1993), The Melody of Love (1993), The Law (1994), Hum Aapke Hain Koun..! (1994), Megha (1996), Lav Kush (1997), Manchala (1999), and Dulhan Banoo Main Teri (1999).

From 1998 to 2014, A. R. Rahman recorded a few songs with her, including "Jiya Jale" in Dil Se.. (1998), "Ek Tu Hi Bharosa" in Pukar (2000), "Pyaara Sa Gaon" in Zubeidaa (2000), "So Gaye Hain" in Zubeidaa, "Khamoshiyan Gungunane Lagin" in One 2 Ka 4 (2001), "O Paalanhaare" in Lagaan (2001), "Lukka Chuppi" in Rang De Basanti (2006) and Laadli in Raunaq (2014). She made an on-screen appearance in the film Pukar singing "Ek Tu Hi Bharosa."

In 1994, she released Shraddanjali – My Tribute to the Immortals. The album features Mangeshkar's own renditions of the songs sung by her fellow singers and her inspirations as a tribute. The cover versions of the songs sung by K. L. Saigal, Kishore Kumar, Mohammed Rafi, Hemant Kumar, Mukesh, Punkaj Mallick, Geeta Dutt, Zohrabai, Amirbai, Parul Ghosh and Kanan Devi are featured in the album.

She sang both Rahul Dev Burman's first and last songs, with the latter recorded in 1994, titled "Kuch Na Kaho" for 1942: A Love Story.

In 1999, Lata Eau de Parfum, a perfume brand named after her, was launched. She was also awarded Zee Cine Award for Lifetime Achievement the same year. In 1999, she was nominated as a member of Rajya Sabha. However, she did not attend Rajya Sabha sessions regularly, inviting criticism from several members of the House, including the Deputy Chairperson Najma Heptullah, Pranab Mukherjee and Shabana Azmi. She stated the reason for her absence as ill-health; it was also reported that she had not taken a salary, allowance or a house in Delhi for being a Member of Parliament.

=== 2000s ===
In 2001, Mangeshkar was awarded the Bharat Ratna, India's highest civilian honour.

In the same year, she established the Master Deenanath Mangeshkar Hospital in Pune, managed by the Lata Mangeshkar Medical Foundation (founded by the Mangeshkar family in October 1989).

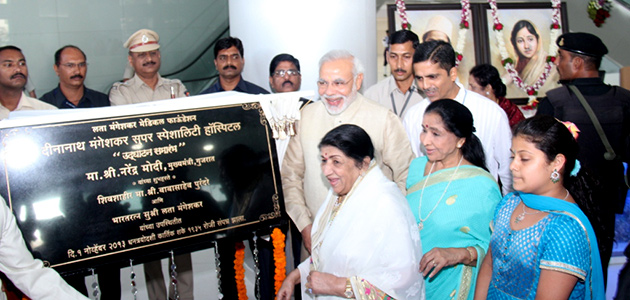
Narendra Modi inaugurates Deenanath Mangeshkar super speciality hospital at Pune

In 2005, she designed a jewellery collection called Swaranajali, which was crafted by Adora, an Indian diamond export company. Five pieces from the collection raised £105,000 at a Christie's auction, and a part of the money was donated for the 2005 Kashmir earthquake relief. Also in 2001, she recorded her first Hindi song with the composer Ilaiyaraaja, for the film Lajja; she had earlier recorded Tamil and Telugu songs composed by Ilaiyaraaja.

Her song "Wada Na Tod" was included in the film Eternal Sunshine of the Spotless Mind (2004) and on its soundtrack.

Her other notable songs of this decade were from Kabhi Khushi Kabhi Gham (2001) and Veer-Zaara (2004).

After 14 years, she recorded a song for composer Nadeem-Shravan; "Kaise Piya Se" for Bewafaa (2005). She recorded with Shamir Tandon "Kitne Ajeeb Rishte Hain Yahan Pe" for Page 3 (2005) and "Daata Sun Le" for Jail (2009).

On 21 June 2007, she released the album Saadgi, featuring eight ghazal-like songs written by Javed Akhtar and composed by Mayuresh Pai.

=== 2010s ===
On 12 April 2011, Mangeshkar released the album Sarhadein: Music Beyond Boundaries, which contains the duet "Tera Milna Bahut Acha Lage" by her and Mehdi Hassan (written by Pakistan's Farhad Shahzad). The album features Usha Mangeshkar, Suresh Wadkar, Hariharan, Sonu Nigam, Rekha Bhardwaj and another Pakistani singer, Ghulam Ali, with compositions by Mayuresh Pai and others.

Shamir Tandon recorded a song with her ("Tere Hasne Sai Mujheko") for the film Satrangee Parachute (2011). After a hiatus she returned to playback singing and recorded the song "Jeena Kya Hai, Jaana Maine" at her own studio for Dunno Y2... Life Is a Moment (2015), the sequel to Kapil Sharma's queer love story Dunno Y... Na Jaane Kyon (2010), for which also she had lent her voice to one song.

On 28 November 2012, she launched her own music label, LM Music, with an album of bhajans, Swami Samarth Maha Mantra, composed by Mayuresh Pai. She sang with her younger sister Usha on the album.

In 2014, she recorded a Bengali album, Shurodhwani, including poetry by Salil Chowdhury, also composed by Pai. She also recorded the song "Laadli" song with A.R. Rahman for his 2014 album Raunaq.

On 30 March 2019, Mangeshkar released the song "Saugandh Mujhe Is Mitti Ki", composed by Mayuresh Pai, as a tribute to the Indian army and nation.

=== 2020s ===
On 17 January 2024, Prime Minister Narendra Modi posted Mangeshkar's last recording, "Shree Ramarpan", a shloka based on the Rama Raksha Stotra recorded by her in 2021, with music by Mayuresh Pai.

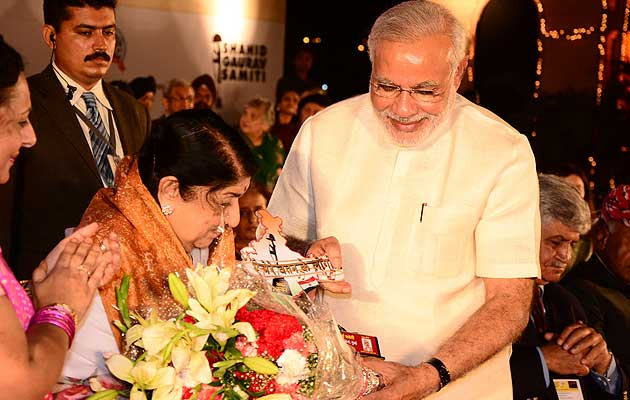
Narendra Modi marks 51 years of 'Ae Mere Vatan Ke Logon' at Mumbai

=== Bengali career ===
Mangeshkar sang 185 songs in Bengali, making her debut in 1956 with the hit song "Aakash Prodeep Jwole", composed by Satinath Mukhopadhyay. The same year, she recorded "Rongila Banshite", composed by Bhupen Hazarika, which was also a hit. In the late 1950s, she recorded a string of hits such as "Jaare Ude Jare Pakhi", "Na Jeona", and "Ogo Aar Kichu To Noy", all composed by Salil Chowdhury, and which were respectively adapted into Hindi as "Ja Re Ud Ja Re Panchi" and "Tasveer Tere Dil Mein" in Maya, and "O Sajna" in Parakh. In 1960, she recorded "Akash Pradip Jole". In the 1960s, she sang hits like "Ekbar Biday De Ma Ghure Ashi," "Saat Bhai Champa," "Ke Pratham Kache Esechi," "Nijhum Sandhyay," "Chanchal Mon Anmona," "Asharh Srabon," "Bolchi Tomar Kaney," and "Aaj Mon Cheyeche" by composers like Sudhin Dasgupta, Hemant Kumar and Salil Chowdhury. In 1983, she recorded the hit prayer song "Mangal Deep Jwele" written by Gauriprasanna Mazumdar and composed by Bappi Lahiri.

== Collaboration with other singers ==
From the 1940s to the 1970s, Mangeshkar sang duets with Asha Bhosle, Suraiya, Shamshad Begum, Usha Mangeshkar, Kishore Kumar, Mohammed Rafi, Mukesh, Talat Mahmood, Manna Dey, Geeta Dutt, Hemant Kumar, G. M. Durrani, and Mahendra Kapoor. In 1964, she sang "Chanda Se Hoga" with P. B. Sreenivas from Main Bhi Ladki Hoon.

Mukesh died in 1976. The 1980s saw the deaths of Mohammed Rafi and Kishore Kumar. After their demise, she continued to sing with Shailendra Singh, Shabbir Kumar, Nitin Mukesh (Mukesh's son), Manhar Udhas, Amit Kumar (Kishore Kumar's son), Mohammed Aziz, Suresh Wadkar, S. P. Balasubrahmanyam, and Vinod Rathod.

In the 1990s, she began singing duets with Roop Kumar Rathod, Hariharan, Pankaj Udhas, Abhijeet, Udit Narayan, and Kumar Sanu. Her most notable work of the 90s was Dilwale Dulhania Le Jayenge, with songs such as "Mere Khwabon Mein Jo Aaye", "Ho Gaya Hai Tujhko To Pyaar Sajna", "Tujhe Dekha To Yeh Jana Sanam", and "Mehndi Laga Ke Rakhna". She did little or no songs with Alka Yagnik, Kavita Krishnamurthy, Anuradha Paudwal, Sadhana Sargam, K. S. Chithra or even Shreya Goshal. This is likely because she mostly did collabs with male singers.

In the 2000s, her duets were performed mainly with Udit Narayan and Sonu Nigam. 2005 to 2006 were the years of her last well-known songs: "Kaise Piya Se" from Bewafa (2005); "Shayad Yehi To Pyaar Hai" from Lucky: No Time for Love (2005) with Adnan Sami; and "Lukka Chhupi" in Rang De Basanti (2006 film) with A. R. Rahman. She sang "Ek Tu Hi Bharosa" from Pukar (2000). Other notable songs of this decade were from Veer-Zaara (2004), sung with Udit Narayan, Sonu Nigam, Jagjit Singh, Roop Kumar Rathod, and Gurdas Mann. One of her latest songs was "Jeena Hai Kya" from Dunno Y2 (2015).

== Non-singing career ==
=== Music direction ===
Mangeshkar composed music for the first time in 1955 for the Marathi movie Ram Ram Pavhane. In the 1960s, she composed music for following Marathi movies under the pseudonym of Anand Ghan.

- 1950 – Ram Ram Pavhana
- 1963 – Maratha Tituka Melvava
- 1963 – Mohityanchi Manjula
- 1965 – Sadhi Manase
- 1969 – Tambadi Mati

She won the Maharashtra State Government's Best Music Director Award for the film Sadhi Manase. The song "Airaneechya Deva Tula" from the same film received best song award.

=== Production ===
Mangeshkar produced four films:

- 1953 – Vaadal (Marathi)
- 1953 – Jhaanjhar (Hindi), co-produced with C. Ramchandra
- 1955 – Kanchan Ganga (Hindi)
- 1990 – Lekin... (Hindi)

== Illness and death ==
On 8 January 2022, Mangeshkar was tested positive for COVID-19 with mild symptoms and was admitted to Breach Candy Hospital's intensive care unit in Mumbai. She remained in the ICU with signs of "marginal improvement" in her health. The doctors treating her had taken her off the ventilator on 28 January after her health "improved marginally"; however, she was back on the ventilator on 5 February, after her health deteriorated, and was undergoing "aggressive therapy".

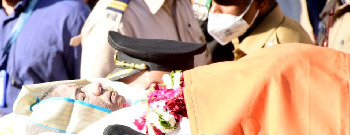
Mangeshkar's state funeral

Mangeshkar died from multiple organ dysfunction syndrome on 6 February 2022, at the age of 92. She had undergone 28 days of constant treatment for pneumonia and COVID-19.

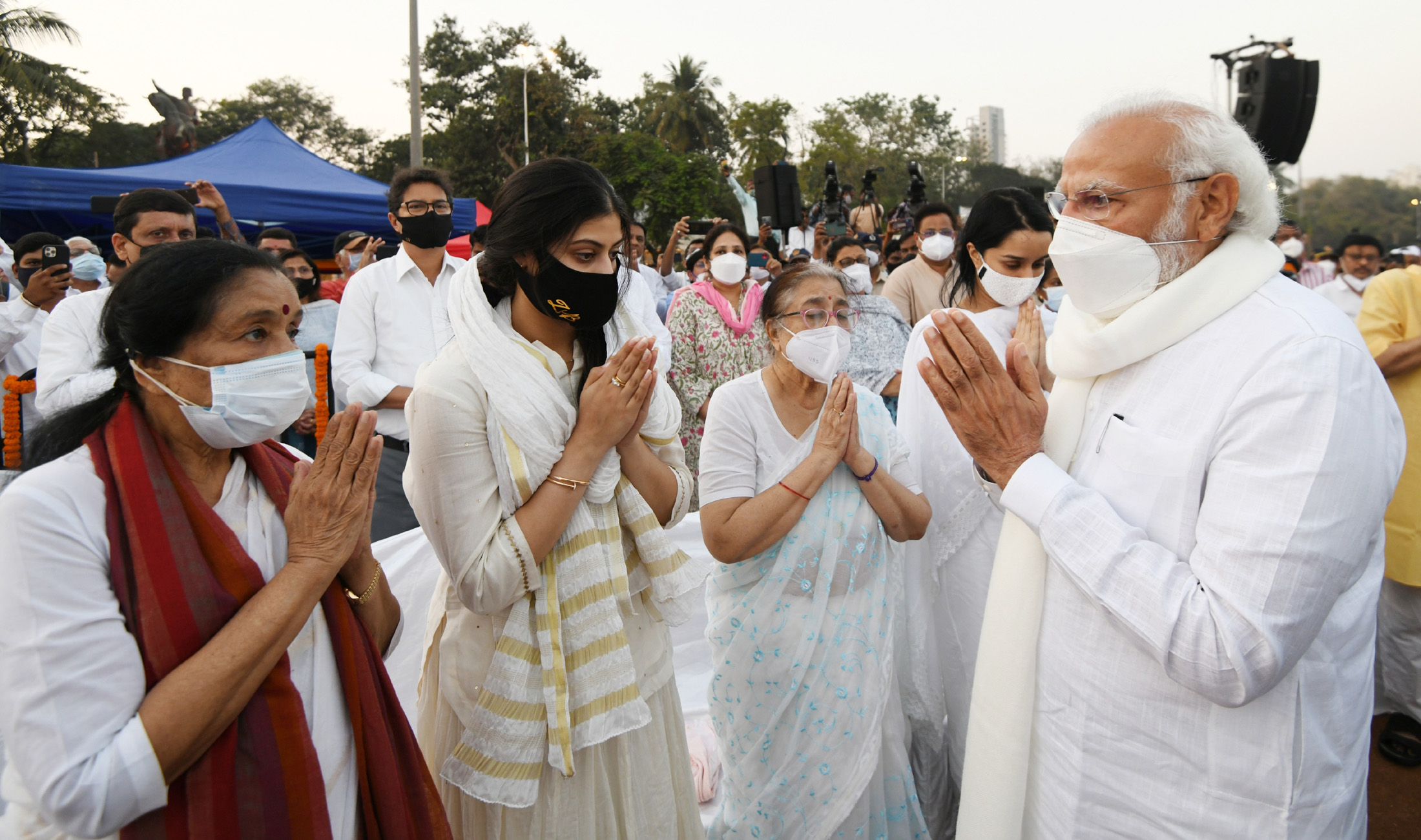
Prime Minister Narendra Modi meets the Mangeshkar family and Asha Bhosle after paying tribute to Lata Mangeshkar in Mumbai.

The Government of India announced a two-day period of national mourning and that the national flag would fly at half-mast from 6 to 7 February throughout India out of respect for her. The then President of India Ram Nath Kovind and then Vice President of India Venkaiah Naidu, Prime Minister Narendra Modi, several Union Ministers and Chief Ministers, many members of the Indian Music Industry, Indian film industry, celebrities, fans, and netizens expressed their condolences. India National Cricket Team players wore black arm band to mourn the loss of Mangeshkar in India vs. West Indies first ODI. President of France Emmanuel Macron; then Prime Minister of Pakistan, Imran Khan; Prime Minister of Bangladesh, Sheikh Hasina; Prime Minister of Nepal, Sher Bahadur Deuba; Prime Minister of Sri Lanka, Mahinda Rajapaksa; former President of Afghanistan, Hamid Karzai; and Pakistani Minister Fawad Chaudhry expressed their grief on her death. Mangeshkar's last rites (performed by her brother, Hridaynath Mangeshkar) and cremation were held, with full state honours, at Mumbai's Shivaji Park on the same day. Prime Minister Narendra Modi, Governor Bhagat Singh Koshyari, Chief Minister Uddhav Thackeray paid their last respects and placed floral tributes. Mangeshkar's sisters Asha Bhosle and Usha Mangeshkar, Devendra Fadnavis, Raj Thackeray, Sharad Pawar, Shah Rukh Khan, Aamir Khan, Ranbir Kapoor, Vidya Balan, Shraddha Kapoor, Sachin Tendulkar, Javed Akhtar, Anuradha Paudwal, and several dignitaries and family members were also in attendance. In February 2022, an electronic billboard in Times Square, Manhattan, sponsored by the Binder Indian Cultural Center, featured a tribute to Mangeshkar. The star cast of CID, namely actors Shivaji Satam, Dayanand Shetty, Aditya Srivastava, and many others paid tribute to Mangeshkar as well, who was a huge fan of the show. Another tribute to Mangeshkar by popular singers (Arnab Chakrabarty, Niharika Nath and Mandira Karmakar) was published in an Arizona US newspaper.

Mangeshkar died the next day, after Vasant Panchami (a festival dedicated to Goddess Saraswati who represents music, knowledge, and the rest of the arts). "This is special as many considered her to be an avatar of Saraswati and the personification of music," according to actress Rani Mukerji.

On 10 February 2022, Mangeshkar's ashes were immersed in the Godavari River at Ramkund, Nashik by her sister Usha and nephew Adinath Mangeshkar.

== Awards and recognition ==
Mangeshkar won several awards and honours, including the Bharat Ratna (2001), India's highest civilian award, Padma Bhushan (1969), Padma Vibhushan (1999), Zee Cine Award for Lifetime Achievements (1999), Dadasaheb Phalke Award (1989), Maharashtra Bhushan Award (1997), NTR National Award (1999), Legion of Honour (2007), ANR National Award (2009), three National Film Awards and 15 Bengal Film Journalists' Association Awards. She also won four Filmfare Best Female Playback Awards. In 1969, she made the unusual gesture of giving up the Filmfare Best Female Playback Award in order to promote fresh talent. She was later awarded the Filmfare Lifetime Achievement Award in 1993 and Filmfare Special Awards in 1994 and 2004.

In 1984, the State Government of Madhya Pradesh instituted the Lata Mangeshkar Award in her honour. The State Government of Maharashtra also instituted a similar award in 1992.

In 2009, she was awarded the title of Officer of the French Legion of Honour, France's highest order.

In 2012, she was ranked number 10 in Outlook India's poll of the Greatest Indian since independence.

Ustad Bade Ghulam Ali Khan said "kambakht, kabhi besuri na hoti" ("[she] is never off-key"). Actor Dilip Kumar once commented, "Lata Mangeshkar ki awaaz kudrat ki takhleek ka ek karishma hain", meaning "Lata Mangeshkar's voice is a miracle from God".

Mangeshkar was included in the 'In Memoriam' segment at the 2022 British Academy Film and Television Awards (BAFTAs).

Mangeshkar was 84th on Rolling Stone's list of the 200 Greatest Singers of All Time, published on 1 January 2023.

She received honorary doctorates from the Sangeet Natak Akademi in 1989; Indira Kala Sangeet Vishwavidyalaya, Khairagarh; Shivaji University in Kolhapur, and York University in Toronto.

== Books on Mangeshkar ==
The first Assamese-language book on Mangeshkar, Swarnokonthi Lata Mangeshkar, was written by Rousanara Begum and published in 2015.

Lata Geetkosh, an encyclopedia of the songs sung by Mangeshkar, was published by Snehasis Chatterjee in 15 volumes.

== Controversy over statistics ==
In 1974, Guinness World Records listed Mangeshkar as the most recorded artist in history, stating that she had recorded "more than 25,000 solo, duet and chorus backed songs in 20 Indian languages" between 1948 and 1974. Her record was contested by Mohammed Rafi, who was claimed to have sung around 28,000 songs. After Rafi's death, in its 1984 edition, the Guinness Book of World Records stated her name for the "Most Recordings", but also stated Rafi's claim. The later editions of Guinness Book stated that she had sung no fewer than 30,000 songs between 1948 and 1987.

The entry was discontinued by Guinness editions in 1991 without explanation, while several sources continued to claim that she recorded thousands of songs, with estimates ranging up to figures as large as 50,000. However, even the earliest Guinness claim of 25,000 songs (between 1948 and 1974) was disputed and claimed to have been exaggerated by several others, stating that the number of songs sung by her in Hindi films to 1991 was found to be 5025. Mangeshkar stated that she did not keep a record of the number of songs she recorded, and that she did not know from where Guinness Book editors got their information. In 2011, the entry was revived by Guinness crediting the record to her sister Asha Bhosle as the most recorded artist in music history, "for recording up to 11,000 solo, duet and chorus-backed songs and in over 20 Indian languages since 1947". Since 2016, current record in this category belongs to P. Susheela, for recording at least 17,695 songs in 6 languages, not counting some lost early recordings.

== Industry influence ==
=== Impact on contemporary singers ===
- Suman Kalyanpur: Frequently cited as the most prominent example due to her vocal similarity to Mangeshkar. While rumors suggested Mangeshkar restricted Kalyanpur's opportunities, Kalyanpur herself maintained that she simply occupied the space available when Mangeshkar was involved in royalty disputes with composers.
- Shamshad Begum and Geeta Dutt: Historians note that as Mangeshkar's "straight" soprano style became the industry standard, the more traditional and nasal styles of Shamshad Begum and the soulful, jazz-influenced style of Geeta Dutt saw a decline.
- Hemlata and Sudha Malhotra: Both singers achieved success with specific composers but faced difficulties establishing long-term careers in mainstream cinema.
- O. P. Nayyar, a veteran musician, did not work with Lata Mangeshkar ever in his entire career, though he gave her sister Asha Bhosle most of his songs especially after the 50s. Both have publicly denied any rumours of a fight between them. OP Nayyar stated in the television show Baaje Payal that he considered Lata to be the "indisputable Melody Queen of India".

=== Response to allegations ===
Mangeshkar consistently denied these claims, stating that music directors chose her based on her caliber and that she often recommended other singers when she was unable to fulfill a commitment. Supporters, including singer Anuradha Paudwal, have defended her, arguing that her longevity was a result of her discipline and unparalleled talent rather than political maneuvering.
