= Hum Bhi Insan Hain =

- Directed by: Phani Majumdar
- Starring: Dev Anand
- Music by: H. P. Das; Manna Dey
- Production company: Maya Art Productions
- Release date: 1948
- Country: India
- Language: Hindi

Hum Bhi Insan Hain (English: We are human too) is 1948 Bollywood film directed by Phani Majumdar and starring Dev Anand, Ramola Devi and Amir Banu. It was a success at the box office.

== Cast ==
- Dev Anand
- Ramola Devi
- Amir Banu
- Niharika
- German
- G. Das
- Pal
