= Khazanchi (1941 film) =

1941 Indian film

- Poster
- Directed by: Moti B. Gidwani
- Produced by: D. M. Pancholi
- Starring: M. Esmail; S. D. Narang; Ramola Devi; Durga Mota; Manorma; Ajmal; Khairati; Jankidas; Pran; Madan Puri
- Cinematography: Badri Das
- Edited by: Shaukat Hussain Rizvi
- Music by: Ghulam Haider
- Production companies: Pancholi Art Pictures; Pancholi Productions, Lahore
- Release date: 1941
- Running time: 171 minutes
- Country: India
- Language: Hindustani

Khazanchi

Khazanchi (transl. Cashier) is a 1941 Indian mystery thriller film directed by Moti B. Gidwani and starring M. Ismail, S. D. Narang, Ramola Devi, Manorama and Durga Mota in lead roles. M. Ismail played the title role of a cashier. It was the highest-grossing Indian film at the time of its release and the highest-grossing Indian film of 1941. It was remade in Tamil as Moondru Pillaigal (1952).

Actress Munawar Sultana, who became a popular actress of Hindi cinema in 1940s and early 1950s, made her earliest appearance in the film, in the song "Peene Ke Din Aaye Piye Jaa". The film also made Shalwar kameez very popular amongst Indian women.

== Synopsis ==
Khazanchi is a murder mystery. Shadi Lal is a 'khazanchi' (cashier) in a bank in Lahore. His son Kanwal wants to marry Madhuri, the daughter of a rich man, Durga Das.

A wicked wealthy, Ajmal, also wants to marry Madhuri. One day, Shadi Lal goes to Bombay for some bank work and the news comes from the city that Shadi Lal has murdered an actress and stolen her jewellery and money.

A clever woman, Tarawati, tricked Shadi Lal in a night club and stole his money, but her two accomplice men murdered her while snatching the money from her and when intoxicated Shadi Lal wakes up, he finds himself with her dead body and his money stolen. Seeing this, he runs away and on the next day, the newspaper headlines say: "Khazanchi Killed Actress". He spends some very bad days of his life during this period.

Later, he gets caught and his son, Kanwal (an advocate now), fought the case from his side. Meanwhile, the newspaper reporter stumbles upon important facts regarding the stage actress' murder and gets kidnapped by the villain, but manages to escape and reaches the court, revealing the truth. Thus Shadi Lal gets acquitted.

== Cast ==
S. D. Narang as Kanwal in the film

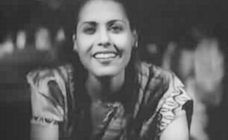
Ramola Devi as Madhuri

- Ramola Devi as Madhuri
- S. D. Narang as Kanwal
- M. Esmail as Shadilal
- Manorma as Asha, Shadi Lal's daughter and Kanwal's sister
- Madan Puri as Kanwal's friend
- Janki Dass M.A. as Ram Das
- Ajmal as Ramesh
- Durga Mota as Durga Das
- Khairati as Maddan, Durga's house servant
- Nafees
- Kamla
- Fazal Shah
- Dev Datt
- Munawar Sultana in the song " "Peene Ke Din Aaye Piye Jaa" " (credited as Asha)

== Music ==
The music director Ghulam Haider made an experiment by combining popular Raags of Indian classical music with Punjabi folk music and revolutionalized the film music industry. The film songs were hits. The playback includes Shamshad Begum and Ghulam Haider.

Song title	Singer
"Diwali Phir Aa Gayi Sajni"	Shamshad Begum
"Laut Gayi Papan"	Shamshad Begum
"Mohe Bhabhi La Do Bhaiyya"	Shamshad Begum
"Mori Chudiya Aayegi Aali"	Shamshad Begum
"Naino Ke Baan Ki Reet Anokhi"	Shamshad Begum, Ghulam Haider
"Pine Ke Din Aaye Piye Ja"	Shamshad Begum
"Sawan Ke Najare Hain"	Shamshad Begum
"Man Dhire Dhire Rona"	Shamshad Begum
