= Ghulam Haider (composer) =

Film music director of India and Pakistan

- Born: Ghulam Haider; 1908; Hyderabad, Sind, British India
- Died: 9 November 1953 (aged 44–45); Lahore, Punjab, Pakistan
- Other name: Master Ghulam Haidar
- Occupation: Film music composer
- Years active: 1932 – 1953
- Awards: Tamgha-i-Imtiaz (Medal of Excellence) by the President of Pakistan (2011); Pride of Performance Award by the President of Pakistan (2018)

Ghulam Haider (1908 – 9 November 1953; also known by the honorary title Master Ghulam Haider) was a Pakistani music composer who worked in India and later in Pakistan after its independence in 1947.

He changed the face of film songs by combining the popular Raags with the verve and rhythm of Punjabi music, and also helped raise the status of film music directors in British India. He is also known for giving well-known playback singer Lata Mangeshkar her first break in the film industry in Majboor (1948).

In an interview, Lata Mangeshkar herself disclosed on her 84th birthday in 2013, "Ghulam Haider is truly my Godfather. It was his confidence in me that he fought for me to tuck me into the Hindi Film Industry which otherwise had rejected me". Remembering her early rejection, Lata once said, "Ghulam Haider was the first music director who showed complete faith in my talent. He introduced me to many producers including S. Mukerji, a big name in film production, but when he too rejected me, Ghulam Haider was very furious. Hence, finally he convinced Bombay Talkies, a banner bigger than S. Mukerji and introduced me through their movie Majboor (1948 film)".

== Early life ==
According to one account, Ghulam Haider was born in 1908 in Narowal, Punjab, British India (now in Pakistani Punjab). Another account says that he was born in Hyderabad, Sindh.

According to a major newspaper, "Ghulam Haider hailed from Muslim Punjabi Sheikh family. After passing his intermediate examination, he was admitted to a college of dentistry and completed his education as a dentist. Being curious about music, he started learning music from Babu Ganesh Lal, Bhai Santoo Khan Pakhawaji (Murad Ali Khan) and Ustad Jhanday Khan. His love for music made him leave his career as a dentist, facing the wrath of his family, he still found a job with Alfred Theatrical Company and Alexander Theatrical Company as a piano player in Calcutta, and worked with Jenaphone (Genophone) Recording Company as a music composer as well. He composed music for the then famous singer, Umrao Zia Begum, who was working for Pancholi Studios, Lahore. He later married her in 1938.

== Career ==
Haider broke into films with the father-son duo Roshan Lal Shorey and Roop Kumar Shorey who were based in Lahore, and then A.R. Kardar gave him the opportunity to compose music for the 1935 film, Swarg Ki Seerhi and Ghulam Haider ended up moving to Bombay. He got his first big breakthrough with D.M. Pancholi's Punjabi film, Gul-E-Bakavali (1939) starring Noor Jehan. This was followed by film Yamla Jat (1940). His first big hit song came with Khazanchi in 1941, which helped cause a revolution in the music industry. The music of the film Khazanchi (1941), in particular, the song Sawan Ke Nazare Hain sung by Shamshad Begum and Ghulam Haider himself caused a revolution in music composing. By then music directors of the 1930s, who had composed film songs set in classical ragas, were beginning to sound commonplace. Khazanchi's refreshingly 'free wheeling music' not only took the audiences by storm but also made other film music directors sit up and take notice. With this film, Ghulam Haider ensured that the Indian film song would never be the same again. Khandan (1942), the first film of Noor Jehan as lead actress, was also a big hit and established him as a top film composer. Film Poonji (1943) was also successful. Then Haider moved to Bombay and composed music for many films including Humayun (1945) and Majboor (1948), the first major breakthrough film for Lata Mangeshkar in Hindi films. Films Shaheed (1948) and Kaneez are his other big hits.

=== Pioneering work ===
He introduced Lata Mangeshkar, Shamshad Begum, Sudha Malhotra and Surinder Kaur to the Indian Film Industry. Besides them, as a film song composer, he played a key role in giving first breakthrough popularity to Noor Jehan in film Khandan. Master Ghulam Haider also gets major credit for introducing the Punjabi folk music and instruments like dholak in the film music. His pioneering work in music later inspired many Punjabi film music directors like Hansraj Behl, Shyam Sunder, Husnlal Bhagatram and Feroz Nizami. His assistants in Mumbai were film music composers Madan Mohan, Datta Naik and Nashad, not to be confused here with Naushad. Later in Pakistan, film music director A. Hameed worked as his assistant.

== Death ==
After independence in 1947, he returned to Lahore in 1949 and his first Pakistani film was Shahida (1949). He composed music for many other Pakistani films like Beqarar (1950), Akeli (1951) and Bheegi Palken (1952) but the films flopped. He died just a few days after the release of Pakistani film Gulnar (1953) due to throat cancer at age 45 at Lahore. Pakistan.

== Awards and recognition ==
- Tamgha-i-Imtiaz (Medal of Distinction) by the President of Pakistan in 2011.
- Pride of Performance Award by the Government of Pakistan in 2018.

== Filmography ==
His major films are:

- Gulnar (1953)
- Aabshar (1953)
- Beqarar (1950)
- Do Saudagar (1950)
- Putli (1950)
- Shahida (1949)
- Kaneez (1949)
- Majboor (1948)
- Shaheed (1948)
- Shama (1948)
- Barsaat Ki Ek Raat (1948)
- Patjhar (1948)
- Jag Beeti (1947)
- Manjhdhar (1947)
- But Tarash (1947)
- Mehndi (1947)
- Jag Beeti (1946)
- Bairam Khan (1946)
- Humayun (1945)
- Phool (1945)
- Chal Chal Re Naujawan (1944)
- Bhai (1944)
- Poonji (1943)
- Khandan (1942)
- Zamindar (1942)
- Chaudhry (1941)
- Khazanchi (1941)
- Yamla Jat (1940)
- Gul-E-Bakawali (1939)
- Majnu (1935)
- Swarg Ki Seerhi (1935)
- Thief of Iraq (1934)

== Popular compositions ==
- Yasrib ko janey waley, mera salaam le ja - a Naat song, (singer: Umra-o-Zia Begum)
- Aashiyaane Ko Mere Jab (film: Thief of Iraq 1934)
- Paigham saba lai hai gulzar-e-nabi se, aaya hai bulawa mujhe darbar-e-nabi se - a Naat song, (singer: Shamshad Begum, lyrics by Wali Sahib), a Radio Lahore Production (1938)
- Shala jawania maney, aakha na morin, pee lai (singer: Baby Noor Jehan, film: Gul-E-Bakawali 1939)
- Pinjare De Vich Qaid Jawanee Mastanee (singer: Baby Noor Jehan, film: Gul-E-Bakawali 1939)
- Kankan dian pakkian faslaan ne (singer: Noor Jehan, film: Yamla Jat 1940)
- Bas bas we dholna, tere naal ki bolna (singer: Noor Jehan, film: Yamla Jat 1940)
- Sawan ke nazarey hain, ha ha ha (singer: Shamshad Begum, film: Khazanchi 1941)
- Ek Kalee Naazon Ki Palee (film: Khazanchi 1941)
- Tu koun si Badli mein, mere Chand hay aa ja (singer: Noor Jehan, film: Khandan (1942)
- Mere liye jehan mein chain hay na qarar hay (singer: Noor Jehan, film: Khandan (1942)
- Sajan Aa Ja, Rajan Aa Ja (film: Bhai 1944)
- Chamko Chamko Bijaliya, Han Bijaliya (film: Chal Chal Re Naujawan 1944)
- Mujhe Madhur Lagata Hai Unsey (film: Chal Chal Re Naujawan 1944)
- Ai Chand Tu Bata De (film: Humayun 1945)
- Data Toree Daya Se Abb Des Hamara (film: Humayun 1945)
- Ho Chand Chamaka Andhere Me Aaj Hai: (film: Humayun 1945)
- Ashkon Pe Huwa Khatam Mere Gham Kaa Fasana: film: Bairam Khan (1946)
- Gulshan Pe Hai Bahar, Koyal Kee Hai Pukar (film: Jag Beeti (1947)
- Ham Hain Dukhiya Iss Duneeya Me (film: Jag Beeti (1947)
- Aaj Mohe Sajan Ghar Jana (film: Majhdhaar (1947)
- Aa Jao Beedeshi Baalama (film: Padmini (1948)
- Aajaa Bedardi Baalama (film: Shaheed 1948)
- Aana Hai Toh Aa Jao Gar (film: Shaheed 1948)
- Ab JiKe Koyi Kyaa Kare (film: Majboor (1948))
- Dil Mera Toda, Mujhe Kahin Ka Na Chhoda (singer: Lata Mangeshkar) - film: Majboor (1948)
- Watan ki rah mein, watan ke no-jawan shaheed ho (singer: Mohammed Rafi, film: Shaheed 1948)
- Dil ko laga ke kahin thokar na khana (singer: Munawar Sultana and Ali Bakhsh Zahoor, film: Beqarar (1950)
- Lo, chal diye woh ham ko tasalli diye baghair - singer: Noor Jehan - film Gulnar (1953 film)
- Bachpan Ki Yadgaro, Mein Tumko Dhundhatee Huun - film Gulnar (1953 film)
